= Opinion polling for the 2027 Salvadoran elections =

The following tables list the results of opinion polls for the presidential, legislative, and municipal elections conducted since 2025 in reverse chronological order for the 2027 Salvadoran presidential, legislative, and municipal elections. The party with the highest percentage is listed in bold and shaded in its party color, and the party with the second highest percentage is in bold and shaded in gray. The lead column shows the percentage between the parties with the first and second highest percentages. For legislative and municipal election polls, projected seat counts, if available, are listed below the percentage.

== Presidential election ==
=== Candidate preference ===
Presidential election polls
Polling firm	Fieldwork date	Sample size						Other	None	Unsure	Lead	Ref.
Polling firm	Fieldwork date	Sample size	Bukele (NI)	Iraheta (ARENA)	Aguirre (FMLN)	García Flamenco (PCN)	Delcid (FPS)	Other	None	Unsure	Lead	Ref.
2027 election	28 Feb 2027	N/A	To be determined					–	–	–	TBD	

=== Pre-primary political party preference ===
Presidential election polls
Polling firm	Fieldwork date	Sample size	NI	FMLN	ARENA	GANA	PCN	PDC	V	FS	PAIS	Other	None	Unsure	Lead	Ref.
29 July 2026: Primary election deadline
Data Poll	8–12 Jul 2026	1,780	88.0	**5.0**	3.0	1.0	–	1.0	2.0	–	–	0.0	–	–	83.0	
IUDOP	Jun 2026	–	63.3	0.9	**1.4**	0.3	–	0.2	1.2	–	–	—	16.5	9.3 (Note: An additional 6.9% said their vote is secret.)	61.9	
LPG Datos	15–23 May 2026	1,200	55.0	0.8	1.3	0.0	0.3	0.2	**2.7**	–	–	—	9.0	20.3 (Note: An additional 5.9% said their vote is secret.)	52.3	
Data Poll	14–18 Feb 2026	960	89.0	3.0	**4.0**	1.0	1.0	–	1.0	–	–	1.0	–	–	85.0	
LPG Datos	19–25 Jan 2026	1,200	56.6	0.2	1.0	0.7	0.2	–	**1.7**	–	0.1	—	4.1	9.2 (Note: An additional 5.6% said their vote is secret.)	54.9	
2024 election	4 Feb 2024	N/A	84.65	**6.40**	5.57	–	–	–	–	0.74	–	2.64	–	–	78.25	

=== Pre-primary candidate preference ===
==== Nuevas Ideas candidates ====
Nuevas Ideas preferred presidential candidate polls
Polling firm	Fieldwork date	Sample size	Ayala	Bukele	Bukele's brothers	Callejas	Castro	Durán	Rodríguez	Trigueros	Other	None	Unsure	Lead	Ref.
LPG Datos	15–23 May 2026	1,200	0.2	**27.6**	–	–	–	0.3	**7.4**	–	2.2	23.1	34.7	20.2	
LPG Datos	19–25 Jan 2026	1,200	–	**31.3**	0.7	0.2	0.2	0.5	**7.0**	0.2	2.2	18.5	39.2	24.3	

==== Opposition candidates ====
Opposition preferred presidential candidate polls
Polling firm	Fieldwork date	Sample size	Flores (FMLN)	Navas (ARENA)	Ortiz (V)	Villatoro (ARENA)	Other	None	Unsure	Lead	Ref.
LPG Datos	15–23 May 2026	1,200	0.3	0.3	**3.9**	**2.3**	0.5	43.7	42.8	1.6	
LPG Datos	19–25 Jan 2026	1,200	0.3	0.5	**4.1**	**1.5**	2.3	49.0	42.0	2.6	

=== Polling regarding re-election ===
Polling firms have asked Salvadorans whether they support or oppose indefinite re-election.

Polling firm	Fieldwork date	Sample size	Supports	Opposes	Undecided	Lead	Ref.
LPG Datos	19–25 Jan 2026	1,200	**55.7** (Note: A further 22.8% support non-indefinite re-election.)	12.0	9.4	43.7	
COP	Sept 2025	1,000	49.0	**50.0**	1.0	1.0	

== Legislative election ==
=== Nationwide polling ===
Nationwide legislative election polls (60 seats)
Polling firm	Fieldwork date	Sample size	NI	FMLN	ARENA	GANA	PCN	PDC	V	FS	PAIS	DS	Other	None	Unsure	Lead	Ref.
29 July 2026: Primary election deadline
Data Poll	8–12 Jul 2026	1,780	– 55 or 56	– 0	– 0	– 0	– 2	– 1 or 2	– 1	– 0	– 0	– 0	– 0	–	–	–	
IUDOP	Jun 2026	–	**51.5**	1.5	**3.4**	0.5	0.1	0.2	2.4	–	–	0.1	0.2	18.5	15.4 (Note: An additional 6.3% said their vote is secret.)	48.0	
7 May 2026: Overseas constituency created with 6 out of 60 seats.
Data Poll	14–18 Feb 2026	960	– 56	– 0	– 0	– 0	– 2	– 1	– 1	– 0	– 0	– 0	– 0	–	–	–	
LPG Datos	19–25 Jan 2026	1,200	**46.3**	0.6	**2.3**	1.2	1.2	0.2	2.2	–	0.2	–	–	3.3	37.3	43.0	
2024 election	4 Feb 2024	N/A	**70.56**; 54	6.28; 0	**7.29**; 2	3.19; 0	3.26; 2	3.15; 1	2.94; 1	1.64; 0	–	–	1.71; 0	–	–	43.27	

=== Department-level polling ===
==== Ahuachapán ====
Ahuachapán legislative election polls (3 seats)
Polling firm	Fieldwork date	Sample size	NI	FMLN	ARENA	GANA	PCN	PDC	V	FS	PAIS	DS	Other	None	Unsure	Lead	Ref.
Data Poll	8–12 Jul 2026	–	**58.0**; 2	4.0; 0	8.0; 0	2.0; 0	**22.0**; 1	– 0	– 0	4.0; 0	– 0	– 0	2.0; 0	–	–	36.0	
2024 election	4 Feb 2024	N/A	**61.70**; 2	4.06; 0	7.42; 0	0.60; 0	**21.04**; 1	–	–	4.64; 0	–	–	0.55; 0	–	–	40.66	

==== Cabañas ====
Cabañas legislative election polls (2 seats)
Polling firm	Fieldwork date	Sample size	NI	FMLN	ARENA	GANA	PCN	PDC	V	FS	PAIS	DS	Other	None	Unsure	Lead	Ref.
Data Poll	8–12 Jul 2026	–	**58.0**; 2	7.0; 0	8.0; 0	**14.0**; 0	4.0; 0	2.0; 0	– 0	– 0	– 0	– 0	7.0; 0	–	–	44.0	
2024 election	4 Feb 2024	N/A	**63.50**; 2	7.05; 0	8.10; 0	**15.37**; 0	3.47; 0	–	–	–	–	–	2.51; 0	–	–	48.13	

==== Chalatenango ====
Chalatenango legislative election polls (2 seats)
Polling firm	Fieldwork date	Sample size	NI	FMLN	ARENA	GANA	PCN	PDC	V	FS	PAIS	DS	Other	None	Unsure	Lead	Ref.
Data Poll	8–12 Jul 2026	–	**44.0**; 1	11.0; 0	8.0; 0	1.0; 0	**30.0**; 1	1.0; 0	– 0	– 0	– 0	– 0	5.0; 0	–	–	14.0	
2024 election	4 Feb 2024	N/A	**48.13**; 1	11.93; 0	6.73; 0	0.55; 0	**32.26**; 1	–	–	–	–	–	0.40; 0	–	–	15.87	

==== Cuscatlán ====
Cuscatlán legislative election polls (2 seats)
Polling firm	Fieldwork date	Sample size	NI	FMLN	ARENA	GANA	PCN	PDC	V	FS	PAIS	DS	Other	None	Unsure	Lead	Ref.
Data Poll	8–12 Jul 2026	–	**64.0**; 2	11.0; 0	**12.0**; 0	11.0; 0	1.0; 0	1.0; 0	– 0	– 0	– 0	– 0	0.0; 0	–	–	52.0	
2024 election	4 Feb 2024	N/A	**67.38**; 2	9.25; 0	**9.58**; 0	8.20; 0	4.75; 0	–	–	–	–	–	0.84; 0	–	–	57.80	

==== La Libertad ====
La Libertad legislative election polls (6 seats)
Polling firm	Fieldwork date	Sample size	NI	FMLN	ARENA	GANA	PCN	PDC	V	FS	PAIS	DS	Other	None	Unsure	Lead	Ref.
Data Poll	8–12 Jul 2026	–	**65.0**; 6	6.0; 0	**9.0**; 0	3.0; 0	– 0	3.0; 0	8.0; 0	– 0	– 0	– 0	6.0; 0	–	–	56.0	
7 May 2026: La Libertad seat count reduced from 7 to 6
Data Poll	14–18 Feb 2026	–	**66.0**; 7	6.0; 0	**8.0**; 0	3.0; 0	3.0; 0	– 0	5.0; 0	– 0	– 0	– 0	9.0; 0	–	–	–	
2024 election	4 Feb 2024	N/A	**69.16**; 6	4.64; 0	**10.36**; 1	2.05; 0	1.55; 0	2.34; 0	4.44; 0	1.15; 0	–	–	4.31; 0	–	–	a	

==== La Paz ====
La Paz legislative election polls (3 seats)
Polling firm	Fieldwork date	Sample size	NI	FMLN	ARENA	GANA	PCN	PDC	V	FS	PAIS	DS	Other	None	Unsure	Lead	Ref.
Data Poll	8–12 Jul 2026	–	**60.0**; 3	8.0; 0	**10.0**; 0	6.0; 0	2.0; 0	– 0	– 0	6.0; 0	– 0	– 0	8.0; 0	–	–	50.0	
2024 election	4 Feb 2024	N/A	**67.54**; 3	5.47; 0	**13.62**; 0	3.43; 0	0.63; 0	0.97; 0	1.45; 0	5.79; 0	–	–	1.10; 0	–	–	53.92	

==== La Unión ====
La Unión legislative election polls (2 seats)
Polling firm	Fieldwork date	Sample size	NI	FMLN	ARENA	GANA	PCN	PDC	V	FS	PAIS	DS	Other	None	Unsure	Lead	Ref.
Data Poll	8–12 Jul 2026	–	**72.0**; 2	**8.0**; 0	7.0; 0	6.0; 0	6.0; 0	1.0; 0	– 0	– 0	– 0	– 0	0.0; 0	–	–	64.0	
2024 election	4 Feb 2024	N/A	**78.11**; 2	5.75; 0	**6.74**; 0	5.63; 0	1.56; 0	1.32; 0	–	–	–	–	0.89; 0	–	–	71.73	

==== Morazán ====
Morazán legislative election polls (2 seats)
Polling firm	Fieldwork date	Sample size	NI	FMLN	ARENA	GANA	PCN	PDC	V	FS	PAIS	DS	Other	None	Unsure	Lead	Ref.
Data Poll	8–12 Jul 2026	–	**52.0**; 2	**20.0**; 0	8.0; 0	6.0; 0	6.0; 0	6.0; 0	– 0	– 0	– 0	– 0	2.0; 0	–	–	32.0	
2024 election	4 Feb 2024	N/A	**63.43**; 2	**16.17**; 0	6.22; 0	6.85; 0	–	6.75; 0	–	–	–	–	0.58; 0	–	–	47.26	

==== San Miguel ====
San Miguel legislative election polls (5 seats)
Polling firm	Fieldwork date	Sample size	NI	FMLN	ARENA	GANA	PCN	PDC	V	FS	PAIS	DS	Other	None	Unsure	Lead	Ref.
Data Poll	8–12 Jul 2026	–	**58.0**; 4	9.0; 0	4.0; 0	3.0; 0	3.0; 0	**22.0**; 1	– 0	– 0	– 0	– 0	1.0; 0	–	–	36.0	
Data Poll	14–18 Feb 2026	–	**56.0**; 4	9.0; 0	5.0; 0	4.0; 0	2.0; 0	**18.0**; 1	– 0	– 0	– 0	– 0	6.0; 0	–	–	38.0	
2024 election	4 Feb 2024	N/A	**59.71**; 4	8.10; 0	3.51; 0	3.72; 0	1.85; 0	**21.21**; 1	–	1.48; 0	–	–	0.41; 0	–	–	38.50	

==== San Salvador ====
San Salvador legislative election polls (11 seats)
Polling firm	Fieldwork date	Sample size	NI	FMLN	ARENA	GANA	PCN	PDC	V	FS	PAIS	DS	Other	None	Unsure	Lead	Ref.
Data Poll	8–12 Jul 2026	–	**75.0**; 10	4.0; 0	6.0; 0	1.0; 0	– 0	2.0; 0	**8.0**; 1	– 0	– 0	– 0	4.0; 0	–	–	63.0	
7 May 2026: San Salvador seat count reduced from 16 to 11
Data Poll	14–18 Feb 2026	–	**81.0**; 15	3.0; 0	5.0; 0	2.0; 0	1.0; 0	– 0	**7.0**; 1	– 0	– 0	– 0	1.0; 0	–	–	74.0	
2024 election	4 Feb 2024	N/A	**76.70**; 14	4.66; 0	5.84; 1	2.15; 0	0.65; 0	1.06; 0	**6.23**; 1	0.71; 0	–	–	2.00; 0	–	–	70.47	

==== San Vicente ====
San Vicente legislative election polls (2 seats)
Polling firm	Fieldwork date	Sample size	NI	FMLN	ARENA	GANA	PCN	PDC	V	FS	PAIS	DS	Other	None	Unsure	Lead	Ref.
Data Poll	8–12 Jul 2026	–	**58.0**; 2	**14.0**; 0	8.0; 0	8.0; 0	2.0; 0	2.0; 0	– 0	– 0	– 0	– 0	8.0; 0	–	–	44.0	
2024 election	4 Feb 2024	N/A	**65.77**; 2	**12.03**; 0	9.26; 0	6.92; 0	1.43; 0	1.13; 0	–	2.68; 0	–	–	0.77; 0	–	–	53.74	

==== Santa Ana ====
Santa Ana legislative election polls (5 seats)
Polling firm	Fieldwork date	Sample size	NI	FMLN	ARENA	GANA	PCN	PDC	V	FS	PAIS	DS	Other	None	Unsure	Lead	Ref.
Data Poll	8–12 Jul 2026	–	**69.0**; 5	**6.0**; 0	**6.0**; 0	4.0; 0	– 0	– 0	**6.0**; 0	3.0; 0	– 0	– 0	6.0; 0	–	–	63.0	
Data Poll	14–18 Feb 2026	–	**78.0**; 5	4.0; 0	**8.0**; 0	4.0; 0	1.0; 0	3.0; 0	– 0	– 0	– 0	– 0	2.0; 0	–	–	70.0	
2024 election	4 Feb 2024	N/A	**74.87**; 5	3.98; 0	**6.03**; 0	5.00; 0	1.23; 0	2.81; 0	1.84; 0	2.69; 0	–	–	1.55; 0	–	–	68.84	

==== Sonsonate ====
Sonsonate legislative election polls (5 seats)
Polling firm	Fieldwork date	Sample size	NI	FMLN	ARENA	GANA	PCN	PDC	V	FS	PAIS	DS	Other	None	Unsure	Lead	Ref.
Data Poll	8–12 Jul 2026	–	**62.0**; 4 or 5	6.0; 0	11.0; 0	2.0; 0	2.0; 0	**12.0**; 0 or 1	– 0	– 0	– 0	– 0	5.0; 0	–	–	50.0	
Data Poll	14–18 Feb 2026	–	**68.0**; 5	5.0; 0	8.0; 0	– 0	2.0; 0	**11.0**; 0	– 0	2.0; 0	– 0	– 0	4.0; 0	–	–	57.0	
2024 election	4 Feb 2024	N/A	**69.57**; 5	5.73; 0	**9.82**; 0	1.37; 0	2.24; 0	8.73; 0	–	1.86; 0	–	–	0.68; 0	–	–	59.75	

==== Usulután ====
Usulután legislative election polls (4 seats)
Polling firm	Fieldwork date	Sample size	NI	FMLN	ARENA	GANA	PCN	PDC	V	FS	PAIS	DS	Other	None	Unsure	Lead	Ref.
Data Poll	8–12 Jul 2026	–	**65.0**; 4	**11.0**; 0	4.0; 0	2.0; 0	– 0	8.0; 0	– 0	8.0; 0	– 0	– 0	2.0; 0	–	–	54.0	
Data Poll	14–18 Feb 2026	–	**75.0**; 4	**10.0**; 0	5.0; 0	1.0; 0	1.0; 0	– 0	– 0	3.0; 0	– 0	– 0	5.0; 0	–	–	65.0	
2024 election	4 Feb 2024	N/A	**74.56**; 4	**9.48**; 0	5.18; 0	1.98; 0	0.65; 0	1.87; 0	–	5.07; 0	–	–	1.21; 0	–	–	65.08	

==== Exterior vote ====
Exterior vote legislative election polls (6 seats)
Polling firm	Fieldwork date	Sample size	NI	FMLN	ARENA	GANA	PCN	PDC	V	FS	PAIS	DS	Other	None	Unsure	Lead	Ref.
Data Poll	8–12 Jul 2026	–	**95.0**; 6	1.0; 0	**2.0**; 0	– 0	– 0	– 0	**2.0**; 0	– 0	– 0	– 0	0.0; 0	–	–	93.0	
7 May 2026: Overseas constituency created with 6 seats
2024 election	4 Feb 2024	N/A	**95.54** –	0.89 –	0.82 –	**1.20** –	0.16 –	0.17 –	–	0.11 –	–	–	0.37 –	–	–	93.43	

=== Polling regarding overseas constituency ===
Polling firms have asked Salvadorans whether they support or oppose the creation of an overseas constituency.

Polling firm	Fieldwork date	Sample size	Supports	Opposes	Undecided	Lead	Ref.
Data Poll	8–12 Jul 2026	1,780	**74.0**	18.0	8.0	56.0	
IUDOP	Jun 2026	–	**62.4**	32.0	5.6	30.4	
LPG Datos	Apr 2026	1,918	45.0	**48.0**	7.0	3.0	

== Municipal election ==
Nationwide municipal election polls (44 municipalities)
Polling firm	Fieldwork date	Sample size	NI	FMLN	ARENA	GANA	PCN	PDC	V	FS	PAIS	DS	Other	None	Unsure	Lead	Ref.
29 July 2026: Primary election deadline
IUDOP	Jun 2026	–	**41.9**	1.8	**3.6**	1.4	1.2	2.0	1.3	–	0.1	0.1	0.2	19.5	21.4 (Note: An additional 5.6% said their vote is secret.)	48.0	
LPG Datos	19–25 Jan 2026	1,200	**33.2**	1.2	**3.1**	2.9	1.7	1.1	0.9	–	–	–	–	4.4	47.1	30.1	
2024 election	3 Mar 2024	N/A	**39.12**; 28	7.78; 0	9.78; 1	**13.41**; 6	9.20; 4	11.16; 4	0.56; 0	4.36; 1	–	4.64; 0	–	–	–	25.71	

== See also ==
- Opinion polling for the 2024 Salvadoran elections
- Opinion polling on the Nayib Bukele presidency
