= Opinion polling for the 2024 Salvadoran elections =

The following tables list the results of opinion polls for the presidential, legislative, and municipal elections conducted since October 2022 in reverse chronological order for the 2024 Salvadoran presidential and legislative elections. The party with the highest percentage is listed in bold and shaded in its party color, and the party with the second highest percentage is in bold and shaded in gray. The lead column shows the percentage between the parties with the first and second highest percentages. For legislative and municipal election polls, projected seat counts, if available, are listed below the percentage.

== Presidential election ==
=== Graphical summary ===
Local regression of polls conducted

=== After 20 July 2023 ===
Presidential election polls
Polling firm	Fieldwork date	Sample size								Other	None	Unsure	Lead	Ref.
Polling firm	Fieldwork date	Sample size	Bukele (NI)	Sánchez (ARENA)	Flores (FMLN)	Parada (NT)	Renderos (FS)	Murillo (FPS)	Cardoza (PAIS)	Other	None	Unsure	Lead	Ref.
2024 election	4 Feb 2024	N/A	84.65	5.57	**6.40**	2.04	0.74	0.60	–	–	–	–	78.25	
Cid-Gallup (exit poll)	4 Feb 2024	–	87.0	4.0	**7.0**	1.6	0.6	0.5	–	–	–	–	80.0	
End of the presidential campaigning period on 31 January 2024
Cid-Gallup	Jan 2024	2,400	79.0	**4.0**	**4.0**	–	–	–	–	1.0	–	12.0	74.0	
Iudop-UCA	3–14 Jan 2024	2,892	81.9	3.4	**4.2**	2.5	1.1	1.0	–	–	3.0	3.0	77.7	
Iudop-UCA	3–14 Jan 2024	1,264	68.7	1.3	**2.3**	0.5	0.1	0.0	–	–	7.8	19.3	66.4	
CEC-UFG	3–8 Jan 2024	1,904	70.9	2.7	**2.9**	1.1	0.6	0.6	–	–	6.1	15.0	68.0	
Fundaungo	11 Nov–14 Dec 2023	1,201	56.0	2.1	**3.3**	0.9	–	–	–	1.7	0.6	22.3	52.7	
Iudop-UCA	11–29 Nov 2023	1,512	61.7	1.5	**2.6**	0.3	–	0.2	0.1	1.7	9.4	14.0	59.1	
Cid-Gallup	6–13 Nov 2023	1,200	79.0	**3.0**	2.0	–	–	–	–	2.0	–	14.0	76.0	
Beginning of the presidential campaigning period on 3 October 2023
OPINES	18 Sept 2023	1,320	92.0	**2.0**	1.0	0.3	–	–	–	–	2.0	2.7	90.0	
CEC-UFG	15–21 Aug 2023	1,920	68.4	**4.3**	2.8	2.0	1.5	–	–	–	9.2	11.8	64.1	

=== Before 20 July 2023 ===
Presidential election polls
Polling firm	Fieldwork date	Sample size	NI	ARENA	FMLN	GANA	PCN	PDC	NT	V	Other	None	Unsure	Lead	Ref.
Primary elections finalized by 20 July 2023
Fundaungo	2 May–9 Jun 2023	2,314	**53.7**	1.9	**2.5**	1.6	0.1	0.1	0.3	0.7	0.3	–	38.8	51.2	
CEC-UFG	27 May–1 Jun 2023	1,334	**70.3**	**3.3**	1.2	1.8	–	–	–	–	–	–	23.4	67.0	
LPG Datos	15–24 Feb 2023	1,520	**54.0**	**1.5**	0.7	0.5	–	–	–	0.8	–	–	42.5	52.5	
LPG Datos	16–21 Nov 2022	1,520	**49.3**	**2.6**	–	1.4	–	–	–	1.1	8.6	9.8	27.2	46.7	
CEC-UFG	27–31 Oct 2022	1,227	**66.2**	**2.2**	1.3	1.3	0.3	–	0.2	0.5	–	9.8	18.2	48.0	
2019 election	7 Feb 2019	N/A	–	**31.72**	14.41	**53.10**	–	–	–	0.77	–	–	–	21.38	

== Legislative election ==
Local regression of polls conducted

Legislative election polls
Polling firm	Fieldwork date	Sample size	NI	ARENA	FMLN	GANA	PCN	PDC	NT	V	CD	DS	FPS	PAIS	FS	Other	None	Unsure	Lead	Ref.
2024 election	4 Feb 2024	N/A	**70.56**; 54	**7.29**; 2	6.28; 0	3.19; 0	3.26; 2	3.15; 1	1.32; 0	2.94; 1	0.39; 0	–	–	–	1.64; 0	–	–	–	43.27	
Cid-Gallup	Jan 2024	2,400	**60.0**; 56	**5.0**; 2	2.0; 1	4.0; 1	– 0	– 1	– 0	– 0	– 0	– 0	– 0	– 0	– 0	2.0; 0	–	27.0	55.0	
Iudop-UCA	3–14 Jan 2024	534	**67.6**	**4.7**	3.6	2.6	–	0.4	0.9	0.4	–	–	–	–	–	–	–	19.9	62.9	
Iudop-UCA	3–14 Jan 2024	428	**58.6**	2.1	3.0	**5.6**	1.9	0.9	0.7	0.2	0.2	–	–	–	0.5	–	–	26.2	53.0	
CEC-UFG	3–8 Jan 2024	1,904	– 57	– 2	– 0	– 0	– 0	– 1	– 0	– 0	– 0	– 0	– 0	– 0	– 0	–	–	–	–	
Beginning of the legislative campaigning period on 3 December 2023
Iudop-UCA	11–29 Nov 2023	866	**81.2**	3.6	**5.5**	3.9	0.6	0.7	1.5	2.0	0.3	0.0	0.2	0.1	0.3	–	–	0.1	75.7	
CEC-UFG	15–21 Aug 2023	1,920	**59.0**; 58	**5.8**; 1	2.9; 1	2.5; 0	2.1; 0	1.2; 0	0.5; 0	0.9; 0	0.4; 0	0.0; 0	0.1; 0	0.4; 0	1.1; 0	–	12.0	11.1	53.2	
Primary elections finalized by 20 July 2023
Fundaungo	2 May–9 Jun 2023	2,314	**45.0**	2.7	2.9	**3.1**	0.3	0.1	0.3	0.7	–	–	–	–	–	1.6	9.1	25.9	42.1	
CEC-UFG	27 May–1 Jun 2023	1,334	**63.0**	**5.0**	1.3	2.8	–	–	–	1.4	–	–	–	–	–	1.6	4.7	20.2	58.0	
LPG Datos	15–24 Feb 2023	1,500	**49.7**	**2.5**	1.4	–	–	–	–	–	–	–	–	–	–	2.7	–	43.7	47.2	
LPG Datos	16–21 Nov 2022	1,520	**44.3**	**3.1**	1.1	2.6	–	–	–	–	–	–	–	–	–	1.7	9.7	33.9	41.2	
CEC-UFG	27–31 Oct 2022	1,227	**62.8**	**2.9**	2.0	1.7	0.7	0.1	0.2	0.8	–	–	–	–	–	–	10.2	18.6	59.9	
2021 election	28 Feb 2021	N/A	**66.46**; 56	**12.18**; 14	6.91; 4	5.29; 5	4.08; 2	1.70; 1	1.70; 1	1.01; 1	0.56; 0	–	–	–	–	–	–	–	54.28	

== Municipal election ==
Municipal election polls
Polling firm	Fieldwork date	Sample size	NI	ARENA	FMLN	GANA	PCN	PDC	NT	V	CD	DS	FPS	PAIS	FS	Other	None	Unsure	Lead	Ref.
2024 election	3 Mar 2024	N/A	**39.12**; 28	9.78; 1	7.78; 0	**13.41**; 6	9.20; 4	11.16; 4	0.94; 0	0.56; 0	3.24; 0	–	0.46; 0	–	4.36; 1	–	–	–	25.71	
Beginning of the municipal campaigning period on 5 February 2024
CEC-UFG	3–8 Jan 2024	1,904	**54.7**	**5.8**	2.8	3.3	–	3.0	–	–	–	–	–	–	–	12.1	18.3	–	48.9	
Iudop-UCA	11–29 Nov 2023	1,512	**40.3**	**4.8**	4.0	4.0	1.0	0.9	0.7	0.8	0.1	0.0	0.2	0.1	0.4	–	11.5	31.2	35.5	
Fundaungo	1–5 Sept 2023	502	**35.9**	2.1	1.0	**2.2**	1.4	–	0.1	0.1	–	–	–	–	–	2.4	17.1	37.7	33.7	
Primary elections finalized by 20 July 2023
Fundaungo	2 May–9 Jun 2023	2,314	**40.4**	3.5	3.7	**4.9**	0.8	0.3	0.2	0.4	–	–	–	–	–	0.3	–	45.5	35.5	
CEC-UFG	27 May–1 Jun 2023	1,334	**56.7**	**4.9**	2.2	3.2	0.2	0.4	0.4	0.9	0.3	0.4	–	–	0.1	0.3	6.5	23.5	51.8	
LPG Datos	15–24 Feb 2023	1,500	**41.9**	**4.3**	2.3	1.9	–	–	–	–	–	–	–	–	–	2.0	–	47.6	37.6	
LPG Datos	16–21 Nov 2022	1,520	**35.3**	**4.6**	2.2	3.6	–	–	–	–	–	–	–	–	–	2.7	8.2	41.0	30.7	
CEC-UFG	27–31 Oct 2022	1,227	**50.0**	**3.4**	2.2	2.5	0.8	0.5	0.2	0.8	–	–	–	–	–	–	10.5	29.1	46.6	
2021 election	28 Feb 2021	N/A	**50.78**; 152	**19.01**; 35	11.16; 30	10.86; 27	4.93; 14	1.73; 3	0.45; 0	0.39; 1	0.69; 0	–	–	–	–	–	–	–	31.77	

== Polling on Bukele's re-election ==
According to polling conducted CIESCA and TResearch shortly after Bukele's announcement of re-election campaign, a large majority of Salvadorans support Bukele's re-election bid. Additionally, many Salvadoran Americans strongly support Bukele's re-election.

The following table lists the results of opinion polls regarding Bukele's re-election, with the option with the highest percentage listed in bold and displayed with its background shaded, and the lead column shows the difference between the "would support" and the "would not support" options. The following graph visualizes local regression of the table's results.

Polling firm	Fieldwork date	Sample size	Would support	Would not support	Undecided	Lead	Ref.
Iudop-UCA	11–29 Nov 2023	1,512	69.9	24.3	5.8	45.6	
TResearch	Jun 2023	1,000	90.9	8.8	0.3	82.1	
CEC-UFG	27 May–1 Jun 2023	1,334	75.6	12.5	11.9	63.1	
CIESCA	May 2023	–	91.85	5.36	2.79	86.49	
TResearch	May 2023	1,000	90.4	9.3	0.3	81.1	
TResearch	Apr 2023	1,000	91.2	7.5	1.3	83.7	
TResearch	Mar 2023	1,000	92.6	6.2	1.2	86.4	
LPG Datos	15–24 Feb 2023	1,500	68.0	13.0	19.0	55.0	
TResearch	14–16 Feb 2023	1,000	93.9	5.7	0.4	88.2	
CEC-UFG	4–8 Feb 2023	1,263	62.2	19.0	18.8	43.2	
TResearch	Jan 2023	1,000	92.7	5.9	1.4	86.8	
TResearch	Dec 2022	1,000	93.7	4.8	1.5	88.9	
LPG Datos	16–21 Nov 2022	1,520	64.6	17.9	17.5	46.7	
TResearch	Nov 2022	1,000	94.1	4.5	1.4	89.6	
CEC-UFG	27–31 Oct 2022	1,227	74.7	12.8	12.5	61.9	
CEC-UFG	27–31 Oct 2022	1,227	77.2	11.0	11.8	66.2	
TResearch	Oct 2022	1,000	94.8	3.9	1.3	90.9	
TResearch	17–19 Sep 2022	1,000	94.3	4.4	1.4	89.9	
CIESCA	18 Sep 2022	25,623	88.3	11.7	–	76.6	
CEC-UFG	10–14 Sep 2022	1,231	58.9	23.1	15.0	35.8	
CEC-UFG	26 May 2022	–	72.2	–	–	–	

== Intentions to vote ==
Polling firm	Fieldwork date	Sample size	Will vote	Will not vote	Undecided	Lead	Ref.
Fundaungo	1–5 Sept 2023	502	**82.8**	16.7	0.5	66.1	
Fundaungo	2 May–9 Jun 2023	2,314	**83.2**	15.1	1.7	68.1	
LPG Datos	Feb 2023	–	**83.6**	9.5	6.9	74.1	
LPG Datos	Nov 2022	–	**78.8**	10.3	11.0	68.5	

== See also ==
- Opinion polling for the 2027 Salvadoran elections
- Opinion polling on the Nayib Bukele presidency
