= 2024 Salvadoran general election =

2024 Salvadoran general election may refer to:

- 2024 Salvadoran presidential election
- 2024 Salvadoran legislative election
