= 2027 Salvadoran legislative election =

- 28 February 2027
- All 60 seats in the Legislative Assembly; 31 seats needed for a majority
Party	Leader	Current seats
NI	Xavier Zablah Bukele	54
ARENA	Carlos García Saade	2
PCN	Manuel Rodríguez	2
PDC	Reinaldo Carballo	1
Vamos	Cesia Rivas	1
Incumbent President
Ernesto Castro; Nuevas Ideas

Legislative and municipal elections are scheduled to be held in El Salvador on 28 February 2027, three years after the 2024 legislative election. Salvadorans will elect all 60 members of the Legislative Assembly of El Salvador and all members of the country's 44 municipal councils. The election will occur with concurrent presidential elections. As of February 2026, eleven political parties are eligible to participate in the election.

== Political background ==
Nuevas Ideas, the political party of Salvadoran president Nayib Bukele, won the 2024 legislative election in a landslide victory, winning 54 of the Legislative Assembly's 60 seats. Nuevas Ideas and allied parties also won 43 of the country's 44 municipalities and 16 of El Salvador's 20 seats in the Central American Parliament (PARLACEN). The members of the 14th Legislative Assembly and the 44 municipal councils assumed office on 1 May 2024.

=== Electoral reforms ===
On 31 July 2025, the Legislative Assembly voted to reform the constitution of El Salvador. One of the reforms included El Salvador's withdrawal from PARLACEN, describing it as an "inefficient waste" ("gasto ineficiente"). Due to this withdrawal, El Salvador will not elect members to PARLACEN in 2027. Another reform moved the date of the 2029 presidential election to 2027 and extended presidential terms to six years. This reform made it so future presidential and legislative elections will occur in concurrence with each other instead of being staggered.

On 29 April 2026, Bukele proposed a constitutional reform to give Salvadorans expatriates representation in the Legislative Assembly. As of that date, there were 944,684 Salvadorans abroad registered to vote. Since the approval of an expatriate voting law in 2022, votes from Salvadoran expatriates were counted to the legislative seats of the San Salvador Department. The reform was approved by the Legislative Assembly on 29 April and was ratified on 7 May. In total, 6 seats were allocated to the overseas constituency but the legislature's 60-seat composition was not affected as one seat was taken from La Libertad and five were taken from San Salvador. The Supreme Electoral Court (TSE) stated that it would implement the reforms ahead of the 2027 election.

Manuel Flores, the secretary-general of the Farabundo Martí National Liberation Front (FMLN), stated that the party anticipated the overseas constituency reform and that it was ready to nominate candidates. Ronal Umaña, the founder of the Cambio Total political party, criticized the reform and accused the Legislative Assembly of taking seats away from Salvadorans. He also claimed that all seats would go to Nuevas Ideas. Nationalist Republican Alliance (ARENA) deputy Marcela Villatoro criticized the removal of seats from La Libertad and San Salvador as those departments have the highest levels of migration, and deputy Francisco Lira described the reform as a concentration of power.

== Electoral system ==
=== Electoral procedure ===
The number of seats in the Legislative Assembly assigned to each of the 14 departments and overseas constituency

In February 2025, the TSE announced that it had scheduled the 2027 legislative and municipal elections to occur on 28 February 2027. Salvadorans outside of the country will be able to vote online from 30 January to 28 February. As of 6 June 2026, there are 6,550,487 registered voters, of which, 5,451,501 reside in the country and 1,098,986 live abroad.

All legislative candidates must be Salvadoran citizens by birth and be at least 25 years old. Members of the Legislative Assembly will be elected via the D'Hondt method. On 2 December 2025, the Legislative Assembly approved a US$172.1 million budget for the 2027 election.

=== Political parties ===
Political parties must be registered with the TSE in order to participate in the 2027 legislative and municipal elections. As of February 2026, eleven political parties are eligible to participate in the election. New political parties have until 4 April to petition the TSE for registration and until 31 August to be fully registered.

Party		Leader	2024 results	
Party		Leader	Legislative	Municipalities
PDC	Christian Democratic Party; Partido Demócrata Cristiano	Reinaldo Carballo	1 / 60	4 / 44
FMLN	Farabundo Martí National Liberation Front; Frente Farabundo Martí para la Liberación Nacional	Manuel Flores	0 / 60	0 / 44
GANA	Grand Alliance for National Unity; Gran Alianza por la Unidad Nacional	Nelson Guardado	0 / 60	6 / 44
V	Let's Go; Vamos	Cesia Rivas	1 / 60	0 / 44
PCN	National Coalition Party; Partido de Concertación Nacional	Manuel Rodríguez	2 / 60	4 / 44
ARENA	Nationalist Republican Alliance; Alianza Republicana Nacionalista	Carlos García Saade	2 / 60	1 / 44
NI	New Ideas; Nuevas Ideas	Xavier Zablah Bukele	54 / 60	28 / 44
DS	Salvadoran Democracy; Democracia Salvadoreña	Ezequiel Mendoza Fermán	0 / 60	0 / 44
PAIS	Salvadoran Independent Party; Partido Independiente Salvadoreño	Roy García	0 / 60	0 / 44
FPS	Salvadoran Patriotic Fraternity; Fraternidad Patriota Salvadoreña	Óscar Morales Lemus	0 / 60	0 / 44
FS	Solidary Force; Fuerza Solidaria	Rigoberto Soto	0 / 60	1 / 44

== Candidates ==
=== Retiring deputies ===
Party	Retiring deputy	Department	Serving since	Ref.
Nuevas Ideas	Nancy Yanira Alfaro Márquez	Cabañas	1 May 2024	
Nuevas Ideas	Rodrigo Javier Ayala Claros	San Salvador	1 May 2021	
Nuevas Ideas	Raúl Neftalí Castillo Rosales	Usulután	1 May 2021	
Nuevas Ideas	Walter David Coto Ayala	La Paz	1 May 2021	
Nuevas Ideas	Dania Abigaíl González Rauda	San Salvador	1 May 2024	
Nuevas Ideas	Ana Marisela Canales de Guardado	Usulután	1 May 2021	
Nuevas Ideas	Ana Magdalena Figueroa Figueroa	San Salvador	1 May 2021	
Nuevas Ideas	Johana Paola Hernández Batres	Usulután	1 May 2024	
Nuevas Ideas	Saúl Enrique Mancía	Chalatenango	1 May 2021	
Nuevas Ideas	Edgardo Antonio Meléndez Mulato	San Salvador	1 May 2021	
Nuevas Ideas	Herbert Azael Rodas Díaz	La Unión	1 May 2021	

== Election campaign ==
Political parties have until 7 April 2026 to convoke their legislative and municipal primary elections and until 29 July to hold them. The parties will then have until 19 November to register their legislative and municipal candidates with the TSE. Citizen Action, a non-governmental organization, will monitor the primary elections. Days after the deadline to convoke primary elections, Citizen Action reported that no political party published its full list of requirements for candidates to participate in their primaries. The official campaigning period sanctioned by the TSE will span from 27 October 2026 to 24 February 2027.

=== Nuevas Ideas ===
In February 2026, Ernesto Castro, the president of the Legislative Assembly, stated that the opposition winning 16 seats in the Legislative Assembly would "cause instability" ("causar inestabilidad") and "dismantle the state of exception" ("desmantelar el régimen"). Later that month, Castro announced that he will run for re-election to the Legislative Assembly and that Nuevas Ideas aimed to win all 60 seats in the Legislative Assembly. Castro has not ruled out forming coalitions with other parties.

Nuevas Ideas held its legislative and municipal primary elections on 12 July. Nuevas Ideas opened registration for primary pre-candidacies on 28 June. By 30 June, 47 of Nuevas Ideas' 54 deputies announced that they will run for re-election. In total, 81 pre-candidates participated in the legislative primary election. Of the party's 60 nominated candidates, 43 were incumbent deputies and a further 7 were incumbent supplement deputies. Additionally, 19 of Nuevas Ideas' 28 mayors are seeking re-election. Nuevas Ideas registered all its legislative candidates with the TSE on 6 November.

=== Nationalist Republican Alliance ===
In September 2025, ARENA party president Carlos García Saade confirmed that ARENA will participate in the 2027 election. In a February 2026 interview with Encuentro TV, Saade said that El Salvador needs a "balance of power" ("balance de poder") in the Legislative Assembly. He also stated that ARENA would not vote to free gang members arrested during the Salvadoran gang crackdown. Saade announced that the party eliminated a requirement for deputy candidates needing to be a member of ARENA for 5 years to run. Joel Sánchez, ARENA's 2024 presidential candidate, remarked on the Las Cosas Como Son show that he believed the opposition could win an additional seat in the Legislative Assembly.

In January 2026, ARENA deputy Marcella Villatoro announced that the party has compiled its list of candidates for the Legislative Assembly from the San Salvador Department. Villatoro stated that ARENA expects to win "the largest possible number" ("el mayor número posible") of seats in the Legislative Assembly. On 13 February 2026, Milagro Navas announced that she will run for re-election as Mayor of La Libertad Este. She is ARENA's only mayor and the only one of El Salvador's 44 mayors aligned with the opposition. ARENA held its primary election on 26 July, having postponed them from 19 July. In August, Saade stated that ARENA would not form coalitions with any political party. That same month, he stated that the party aimed to win 10 seats in the Legislative Assembly and 12 municipalities, further criticizing parties that aimed to win 30 to 40 seats by accusing them of lying.

=== Farabundo Martí National Liberation Front ===
On 7 December 2025, Flores announced that the FMLN will participate in the 2027 election. He added that the party was open to forming coalitions in the legislative and municipal elections to defeat Bukele's allies but ruled out forming coalitions with ARENA. The FMLN eliminated a rule requiring its electoral candidates to be party members, referring to non-party candidates as "citizen candidates" ("ciudadanos candidatos"). Flores has announced that he will lead the FMLN's 2027 electoral campaign. According to Flores, the FMLN hopes to win at least one seat in the Legislative Assembly.

The FMLN held its primary elections on 26 July 2026. In April, Flores announced that the FMLN would allow candidates from the political right to run as members of the FMLN, stating that the FMLN was no longer a party of guerrillas. In June, Flores alleged that several businessmen were interested in seeking office with the FMLN but were supposedly threatened with financial persecution by tax authorities. In August, Flores announced that the FMLN would not form a coalitions with ARENA or Vamos.

=== Grand Alliance for National Unity ===
In February 2026, Grand Alliance for National Unity (GANA) vice president Guillermo Gallegos stated that GANA aimed to increase its number of mayors two- or three-fold. Party affiliate Maximiliano Díaz stated that the party sought to return to the Legislative Assembly after having lost all its seats in the 2024 election, adding that "[GANA] wants to be associates, not accomplices" ("nosotros queremos ser socios, no cómplices") and that GANA wants to serve as a "constructive opposition" ("oposición constructiva").

Gallegos has stated that the party is open to forming legislative and municipal coalitions with any political party with the exception of ARENA, the FMLN, and Vamos. In April 2026, Gallegos stated that the party was in negotiations to form municipal coalitions with Nuevas Ideas, the National Coalition Party (PCN), the Christian Democratic Party (PDC), and Solidary Force (FS). GANA will hold its legislative and municipal primary elections from 1 June to 29 July.

In March 2026, Salvador Menéndez, the mayor of La Paz Oeste, announced that he will not seek re-election in 2027.

=== Vamos ===
In December 2025, Vamos deputy Claudia Ortiz stated that Vamos will not form coalitions with any other party. In February 2026, Ortiz stated that she was evaluating the possibility of her seeking re-election to the Legislative Assembly. She also stated that the party was interested in nominating candidates in the municipal elections. She also announced that the party would form alliances with leaders in "different social sectors" ("diferentes sectores sociales") but would not form coalitions with ARENA or the FMLN, citing that they "had not been allies the people" ("no han sido aliados del pueblo"). According to Ortiz, Vamos projects that it will win at least 16 seats in the Legislative Assembly.

On 16 March, she stated that the party will focus on the legislative and municipal elections rather than on the presidential election. She stated that the party would soon announce the date of its primary election. Vamos will field legislative candidates in all 14 departments for the first time in its history, and party leader Cesia Rivas stated that the party hoped to win a deputy in each department and up to 2 or 3 in La Libertad, San Miguel, San Salvador, and Santa Ana.

Vamos held part of its primary election on 12 July where it nominated legislative candidates in 11 departments. Among the candidates nominated were Ortiz and Rivas, both seeking election to the Legislative Assembly from San Salvador. The legislative primaries for the remaining 3 departments and overseas constituency were held on 26 July. Vamos is fielding municipal candidates in 15 of the 44 municipalities.

=== Christian Democratic Party ===
On 6 March 2026, the Christian Democratic Party announced that it will participate in the legislative and municipal elections. The party held its primary elections on 25 July 2026.

Roberto Aquino, the mayor of Sonsonate Centro, has announced that he will seek re-election.

=== National Coalition Party ===
In February 2026, Nuevas Ideas deputy William Soriano accused the National Coalition Party of allowing former ARENA members to seek office as PCN members in the 2027 elections. In March, PCN leader Manuel Rodríguez criticized Soriano's accusations. The PCN convoked its primary elections on 27 March but has not announced a date.

Deputy Reynaldo Cardoza has announced he is seeking re-election. He also stated that the PCN hoped to win both of Chalatenango's seats in the Legislative Assembly. The PCN held its primary election for the San Salvador Department on 28 June.

=== Salvadoran Independent Party ===
The Salvadoran Independent Party (PAIS) did not convoke its legislative or municipal elections. As PAIS did not participate in the 2024 elections, it must participate in the 2027 elections in order to avoid cancelation by the TSE in accordance with the Law of Political Parties.

=== Solidary Force ===
Solidary Force held its legislative and municipal primary elections on 29 July 2026. Party leader Rigoberto Soto stated that the party is open to forming coalitions with GANA and the PDC.

=== Salvadoran Patriotic Fraternity ===
The Salvadoran Patriotic Fraternity (FPS) will hold its legislative and municipal primary elections will occur from 19 to 26 July.

=== Salvadoran Democracy ===
Salvadoran Democracy (DS) has stated that it will focus its 2027 election participation on the legislative election. The party convoked its legislative and municipal primary elections on 6 April 2026 but has not scheduled a date. As DS did not participate in the 2024 elections, it must participate in the 2027 elections in order to avoid cancelation by the TSE in accordance with the Law of Political Parties.

=== Cambio Total ===
According to Umaña, ARENA offered to name him as the party's candidate for mayor of San Salvador Centro or La Libertad Sur. He said he would accept the nomination if ARENA, the FMLN, and Vamos agreed to form a coalition.

== See also ==
- Elections in El Salvador
- List of elections in 2027
  - 2027 national electoral calendar
