= Salvadoran Independent Party =

Salvadoran political party

Salvadoran Independent Party Partido Independiente Salvadoreño
- Abbreviation: PAIS
- Secretary General: Roy García
- Founder: Roy García
- Founded: October 2021
- Colors: Blue
- Legislative Assembly: 0 / 60
- Municipalities: 0 / 44
- Central American Parliament: 0 / 20

Party flag

The Salvadoran Independent Party (Spanish: Partido Independiente Salvadoreño, abbreviated PAIS) is a Salvadoran political party.

== History ==
The Salvadoran Independent Party was established by Roy García in October 2021. The party was registered with the Supreme Electoral Court (TSE) in November 2021. He was later suspended by the party. García was a potential candidate for president in the 2024 presidential election. Another potential presidential candidate, Gerardo Awad, was suspended by the party in July 2022.

On 28 August 2023, Carlos Molina, the party's deputy secretary, announced that it selected José Rodolfo Cardoza Salguero, an agricultural engineer, as its presidential candidate and Irma Sosa Pineda as its vice presidential candidate. García later stated that Molina's announcement was illegitimate and that the candidates presented were both invalid.

== Electoral history ==
=== Presidential elections ===
Election	Candidate	First round			Second round			Result
Election	Candidate	Votes	%	Pos.	Votes	%	Pos.	Result
2024	José Cardoza	Disqualified						
2027	Will not participate							

=== Legislative Assembly elections ===
Election	Votes	%	Position	Seats	+/–	Status in legislature
2024	Disqualified					Extraparliamentary
2027	Will not participate					Extraparliamentary

=== Municipal elections ===
Election	Votes	%	Position	Seats	+/–
2024	Disqualified				
2027	Will not participate				
