= Solidary Force =

Solidary Force Fuerza Solidaria
- Abbreviation: FS
- Leader: Rigoberto Soto
- Founded: 2019
- Split from: Nationalist Republican Alliance; Grand Alliance for National Unity
- Political position: Right-wing
- Colors: Yellow
- Seats in the Legislative Assembly: 0 / 60
- Municipalities: 1 / 44
- Seats in PARLACEN: 0 / 20

Party flag

Solidary Force (Spanish: Fuerza Solidaria) is a Salvadoran political party which was formed by former members of the Nationalist Republican Alliance (ARENA) and the Grand Alliance for National Unity (GANA). The party's leader is Rigoberto Soto.

== History ==
Solidary Force was formed by former members of the Nationalist Republican Alliance (ARENA) and the Grand Alliance for National Unity (GANA) in 2019.

The party attempted to register with the Supreme Electoral Court to participate in the 2024 presidential election, but the court stated that the party failed to register in time for the 5 March 2023 deadline. Regardless, the party announced it will hold its primary elections on 2 July 2023, but ultimately delayed them for 16 July. On 24 July 2023, the party announced that José Javier Renderos Vásquez, an obstetrician, would be its presidential candidate and that Rafael Montalvo, an agriculturist, would be its vice presidential candidate for the general election.

== Electoral history ==
=== Presidential elections ===
Election	Candidate	First round			Second round			Result	Ref.
Election	Candidate	Votes	%	Pos.	Votes	%	Pos.	Result	Ref.
2024	Javier Renderos	23,473	0.74%	▲5th	–			Lost ✗	
2027	Did not participate								

=== Legislative elections ===
Election	Votes	%	Position	Seats	+/–	Status in legislature	Ref.
2021	Not registered						
2024	51,021	1.64	▲8th	0 / 60	New	Extraparliamentary	
2027	To be determined						

=== Municipal elections ===
Election	Votes	%	Position	Seats	+/–	Ref.
2021	Not registered					
2024	70,455	4.36	▲6th	1 / 44	New	
2027	To be determined					

=== PARLACEN elections ===
Election	Votes	%	Position	Seats	+/–	Ref.
2021	Not registered					
2024	48,856	3.28	▲7th	0 / 20	New	
