= Salvadoran Democracy =

Salvadoran political party

Salvadoran Democracy Democracia Salvadoreña
- Abbreviation: DS
- Leader: Ezequiel Mendoza Fermán
- Registered: 13 September 2013
- Ideology: Progressivism
- Colors: Green
- Legislative Assembly: 0 / 60
- Municipalities: 0 / 44
- Central American Parliament: 0 / 20

Party flag
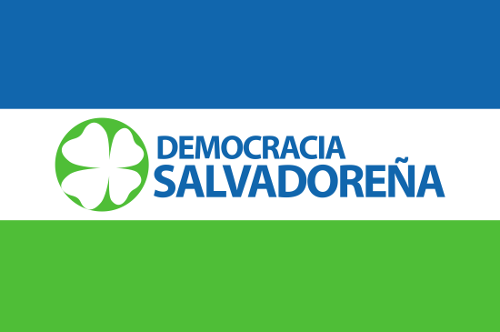

Website
- Website

Salvadoran Democracy (Spanish: Democracia Salvadoreña, abbreviated DS) is a Salvadoran political party.

== History ==
Salvadoran Democracy was registered with the Supreme Electoral Court (TSE) on 13 September 2013, making it eligible to participate in the 2014 presidential election. Its founding leader was Adolfo Salume Artiñano

== Electoral results ==
=== Presidential elections ===
Election	Candidate	First round			Second round			Result
Election	Candidate	Votes	%	Pos.	Votes	%	Pos.	Result
2014	Did not participate							
2019	Did not participate							
2024	Did not participate							
2027	To be determined				Second round abolished			TBD

=== Legislative Assembly elections ===
Election	Votes	%	Position	Seats	+/–	Status in legislature
2015	19,846	0.87	▲8th	0 / 84	New	Extraparliamentary
2018	Did not participate					Extraparliamentary
2021	Did not participate					Extraparliamentary
2024	Did not participate					Extraparliamentary
2027	To be determined					

=== Municipal elections ===
Election	Votes	%	Position	Seats	+/–
2015	13,132	0.55	▲7th	0 / 262	New
2018	1,227	0.05	▼10th	0 / 262	0
2021	Did not participate				
2024	Did not participate				
2027	To be determined				
