= Nuevas Ideas =

Political party in El Salvador

New Ideas Nuevas Ideas
- Abbreviation: N, NI
- Founder: Nayib Bukele
- Leader: Nayib Bukele
- President: Xavier Zablah Bukele
- Founded: 25 October 2017; 9 years ago
- Registered: 21 August 2018; 8 years ago
- Split from: Farabundo Martí National Liberation Front
- Headquarters: 21-A. Col. Miramonte Bernal Ave & Las Oscuranas St.; San Salvador, El Salvador
- Membership (2019): 507,633
- Ideology: Bukelism; Populism; Conservatism
- Political position: 2022–present: Right-wing to far-right 2017–2022: Syncretic; Fiscal: Center-left; Social: Center-right
- Regional affiliation: Center-Democratic Integration Group
- Colors: Cyan; White
- Seats in the Legislative Assembly: 54 / 60
- Municipalities: 27 / 44
- Seats in PARLACEN: 13 / 20

Party flag

Website
- nuevasideas.com
- Politics of El Salvador; Political parties; Elections; A: According to several analysts, the party initially held an ambiguous position on the political spectrum, although it has recently been commonly associated with the right-wing or the far-right.

Nuevas Ideas (English: New Ideas; abbreviated N or NI) is the current ruling political party of El Salvador. The party was founded on 25 October 2017 by Nayib Bukele, the then-mayor of San Salvador, and was registered by the Supreme Electoral Court on 21 August 2018. The party's current president is Xavier Zablah Bukele, a cousin of Bukele who has served since March 2020. Since the 2024 legislative election, it has been the dominant party in the country, having nearly unanimous control of the Legislative Assembly and the vast majority of the Municipalities and the Central American Parliament.

Although Nuevas Ideas was formed before the 2019 presidential election, it was not legally registered as a political party in time to run a candidate. As such, Bukele ran for president as a member of the Grand Alliance for National Unity (GANA), but he continued to use Nuevas Ideas branding throughout his campaign. He won the election with 53 percent of the vote and assumed office on 1 June 2019, becoming the first president in 30 years to not be a member of the country's two largest political parties: the Nationalist Republican Alliance (ARENA) or the Farabundo Martí National Liberation Front (FMLN). During the 2021 legislative election, Nuevas Ideas won a supermajority in the Legislative Assembly, winning 56 of 84 seats. The party also won 152 of the country's 262 municipalities and 14 of the country's 20 seats in the Central American Parliament (PARLACEN).

Ahead of the 2024 presidential election, Bukele announced that he was running for re-election, which was considered unconstitutional by legal experts and diplomatic officials, and Nuevas Ideas leadership stated that the party aimed to win all 60 seats in the Legislative Assembly. In October 2022, the Nuevas Ideas-led Legislative Assembly passed a law to allow Salvadoran expatriates to vote in the election. In June 2023, it passed two proposals made by Bukele to reduce the number of legislative seats from 84 to 60 as well as reduce the number of municipalities from 262 to 44; both actions were described as a consolidation of power. Bukele won re-election by a landslide margin, winning 84.65 percent of the vote. Nuevas Ideas won another supermajority in the Legislative Assembly, winning 54 of 60 seats.

Nuevas Ideas is a big tent political party, rejecting both left-wing and right-wing labels, and Bukele portrays the party as a Third Way. Meanwhile, Bukele himself has been described as a conservative and has been supported by conservatives abroad. As of 2019, the party has 507,633 members.

== History ==
=== Establishment ===
On 10 October 2017, Nayib Bukele, the then-mayor of San Salvador, was expelled from the Farabundo Martí National Liberation Front (FMLN) by its ethics tribunal after he was accused of violating the party's principles and verbally attacking party official Xóchitl Marchelli. Five days after he was expelled from the party, Bukele expressed his intention to run for president in the upcoming 2019 presidential election as a member of a new political movement. On 25 October 2017, Bukele announced the establishment of a new political party, Nuevas Ideas (Spanish for "New Ideas"), on social media such as Facebook and YouTube. Bukele stated that the party sought to remove the established political parties—particularly the FMLN and the Nationalist Republican Alliance (ARENA)—from their established power.

Bukele claimed that the political system would seek to hinder his presidential candidacy. Fernando Argíello Téllez, a magistrate of the Supreme Electoral Court (TSE), believed that it could be viable that the party would be registered in time for the 2019 presidential election, adding that it "does not have any restriction at this moment" ("no tiene ninguna restricción en este momento"). Regardless, the TSE asked the Constitutional Chamber of the Supreme Court of Justice if Bukele being expelled from the FMLN, rather than resigning or legally changing political affiliation, would make him a defector and disqualify him from running for public office.

By legal requirement, Nuevas Ideas had to collect 50,000 signatures to be legally registered as a political party by the Supreme Electoral Court (TSE). On 8 May 2018, Nuevas Ideas collected 200,000 signatures within a span of three days and turned in 2,000 books of signatures to the TSE. The TSE accepted 176,076 signatures as valid in late-June 2018, but the party was not legally registered until 21 August 2018. As Bukele believed that the party would not be registered in time for the presidential election, he decided to run for president as a member of Democratic Change (CD), but the TSE disqualified the party as it failed to earn more than 50,000 votes in the 2015 legislative and municipal elections. Bukele then sought to run for president as a member of the Grand Alliance for National Unity (GANA), winning the party's presidential nomination on 29 July 2018.

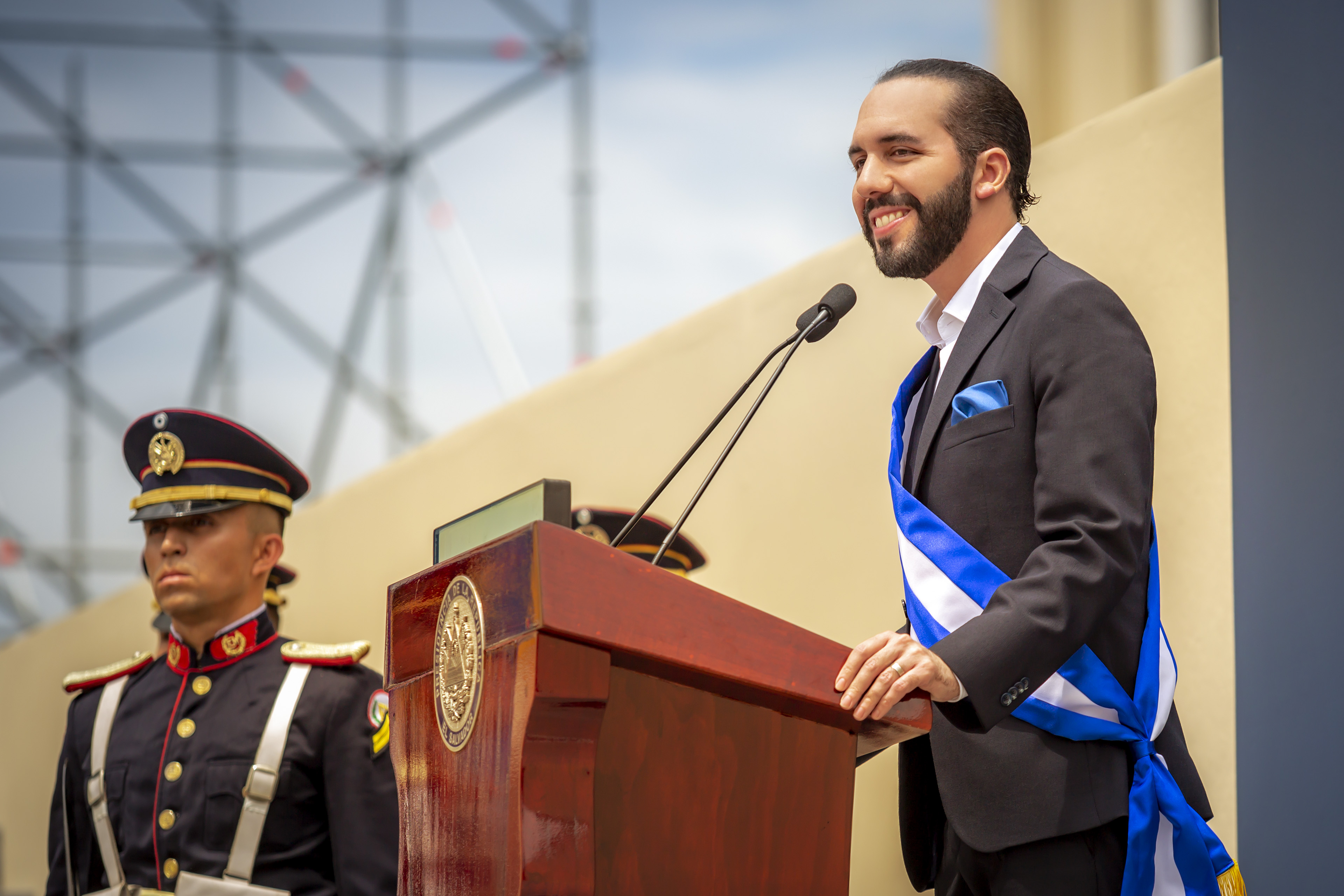
Nayib Bukele's presidential inauguration on 1 June 2019.

Although Bukele officially ran for president as a member of GANA, he continued to use Nuevas Ideas branding throughout his campaign. Opinion polling gave Bukele consistent leads against the ARENA and FMLN presidential candidates, with several giving him over 50 percent support. Bukele ultimately won the 2019 election with 53.10 percent of the vote, foregoing the need for a second round. He was inaugurated on 1 June 2019, becoming the first president since José Napoleón Duarte of the Christian Democratic Party (PDC) left office in 1989 to not be a member of either ARENA or the FMLN.

=== 2021 legislative election ===
Although Bukele was the country's president, he did not control the Legislative Assembly. The legislature was still controlled by the political opposition, while GANA held 11 seats and Nuevas Ideas held zero seats. In an attempt to secure a US$109 million loan from the Central American Bank for Economic Integration (BCIE) for his security policies, Bukele called for an extraordinary legislative session and sent 40 soldiers into the Legislative Assembly in what was described by the opposition as an "attempted coup".

On 19 July 2020, Nuevas Ideas held its primary elections to determine the party's candidates for the upcoming 2021 legislative election, the first election in which the party participated. Candidates for the Legislative Assembly, the country's 262 municipalities, and the Central American Parliament (PARLACEN) were elected via electronic voting. During the primaries, 150 complaints of fraud were issued alleging that some candidates had purchased chips to register more than one vote. Douglas Rodríguez, the secretary of the party's National Electoral Commission (CNE), confirmed that some candidates had bought chips and validated them. The CNE confirmed that it would seek the identities of candidates involved in buying chips and would hand over cases with sufficient evidence to the party's ethics commission.

In September 2020, the El Faro digital newspaper alleged that Bukele had entered into secret negotiations with Mara Salvatrucha and the 18th Street gang, two of the country's largest criminal gangs, to reduce the country's murder rate and vote for Nuevas Ideas in the 2021 election in exchange for repealing anti-gang laws and relaxing security in prisons. Bukele denied the allegations, saying on Twitter "they accuse us of violating the terrorists' [the gang members'] human rights. Now they say we give them privileges? Show me a privilege. Only one" ("Nos acusan de violar derechos humanos de los terroristas. ¿Ahora dicen que les damos privilegios? Muéstrenme un privilegio. Uno solo"), posting images of gang members in cramped conditions during an April 2020 prison crackdown. Some media outlets and Salvadoran voters alleged that, during election day, gang members were present outside of voting stations telling voters to "vote for the N".

Throughout the 2021 election campaign, various opinion polls gave Nuevas Ideas significant leads over the other political parties, with some polls giving the party well over 60 percent support. Nuevas Ideas formed an electoral coalition with GANA during the 2021 election, and both parties won a combined two-thirds of all votes cast in the election. In total, Nuevas Ideas won 56 seats in the Legislative Assembly, 152 municipalities, and 14 seats in PARLACEN.

=== XIII Legislature ===
The 13th session of the Legislative Assembly began on 1 May 2021. Nuevas Ideas, already holding a majority in the legislature, formed a government with GANA, the Christian Democratic Party, and the National Coalition Party (PCN). The government held 64 seats in the Legislative Assembly, which some described as a supermajority. Ernesto Castro was elected by Nuevas Ideas and its allies as the president of the Legislative Assembly, with the remaining 20 deputies abstaining. Christian Guevara served as the party's leader in the Legislative Assembly.

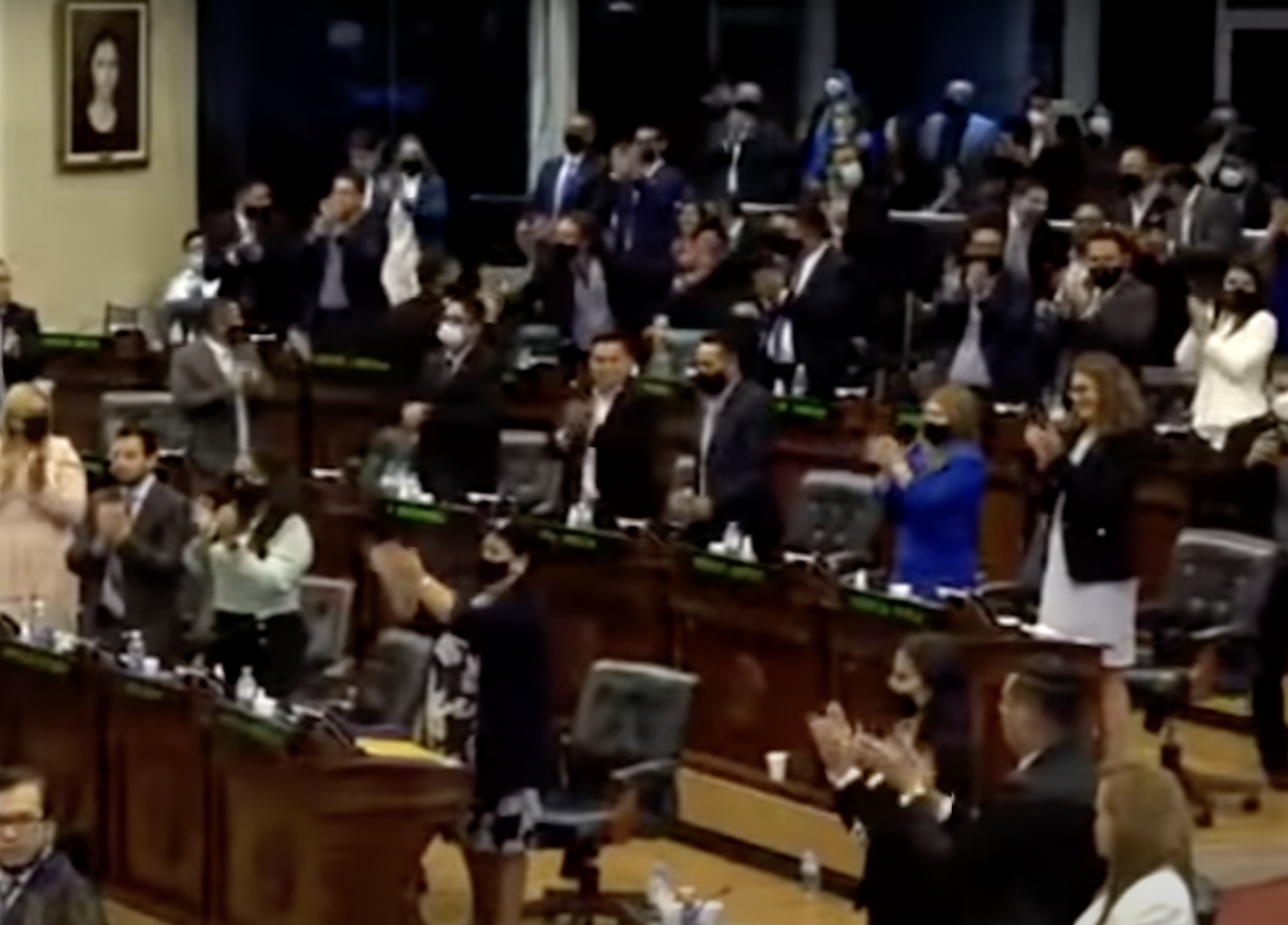
Nuevas Ideas deputies applauding the removal of the Supreme Court justices on 1 May 2021

On the same day the 13th legislative session began, the Nuevas Ideas-led government voted to remove five members of the Supreme Court of Justice's Constitutional Chamber on the basis that the judges had previously issued "arbitrary" decisions. The Legislative Assembly then voted to remove Attorney General Raúl Melara. The judges and attorney general were replaced by supporters of Bukele the following day. The event was described by opposition politicians as a coup, a self-coup, and a power grab.

In June 2021, the Legislative Assembly passed a law to make bitcoin legal tender; the law went into effect on 7 September 2021. In October 2021, Bukele and Nuevas Ideas accused two of its deputies in the Legislative Assembly of negotiating with the United States embassy in San Salvador to fracture Nuevas Ideas and oppose Bukele's political agenda. The embassy and both deputies denied the allegations, but both deputies were expelled from the party regardless. On 27 March 2022, following a significant spike in homicides in the prior three days, the Legislative Assembly voted to declare a state of exception for thirty days. The state of exception, which has led to a large-scale gang crackdown, has since been extended seventeen times and has resulted in over 73,800 arrests as of 9 November 2023 and up to 152 deaths in custody as of as of 16 May 2023. In October 2022, the Nuevas Ideas-led Legislative Assembly passed the Special Law for the Exercise of Suffrage Abroad which allowed Salvadorans living outside of the country to vote in the 2024 elections for the presidency and the Legislative Assembly.

In December 2022, Bukele tweeted that he believed that the country's 262 municipalities should be reduced to 50. In February 2023, Castro not only confirmed that Nuevas Ideas was formally investigating municipal consolidation but also that they were looking into reducing the seats in the Legislative Assembly from 84 to 64. On 7 June 2023, the Nuevas Ideas-led Legislative Assembly approved a proposal submitted by Bukele to reduce the number of seats in the Legislative Assembly from 84 to 60. Opposition figures claimed that the reduction was an attempt to consolidate power for Nuevas Ideas in the legislature and diminish the political participation of smaller political parties. On 13 June 2023, the Legislative Assembly approved a proposal submitted by Bukele to reduce the number of municipalities from 262 to 44. Deputies of Nuevas Ideas argued that the reductions would "generate a more equitable distribution of wealth", improve the quality of life for people in each municipality, and save the government US$250 million per year. Meanwhile, opposition figures have described the reductions as a power grab, a concentration of power, and an attempt by Nuevas Ideas to give itself an electoral advantage.

On 31 July 2023, Nuevas Ideas deputy Erick García resigned from the Legislative Assembly after allegations were made against him by Alejandro Muyshondt, a presidential national security advisor, that he was involved in drug trafficking operations linked to MS-13. Muyshondt presented images of García's staffers allegedly making gang signs and alleged screenshots of García's instant messaging conversations which include images of packaged marijuana. García denied having any affiliation with gangs, and that same day, Nuevas Ideas opened an investigation into the allegations made by Muyshondt. On 9 August 2023, García was expelled from Nuevas Ideas, and the party opened an investigation into his replacement on the Legislative Assembly, Nidia Turcios. On 16 August 2023, García was officially expelled from the Legislative Assembly, and the following day, both him and Turcios were arrested by the National Civil Police. Turcios was also expelled from Nuevas Ideas.

The party's deputies in PARLACEN are affiliated with the Center-Democratic Integration Group (GPICD). Carlos René Hernández Castillo, a member of Nuevas Ideas, serves as the GPICD's leader.

=== 2024 general election ===
On 3 September 2021, the Supreme Court judges who were appointed by Nuevas Ideas in May 2021 ruled that the president of El Salvador is eligible to run for re-election consecutively, making Bukele eligible to run for re-election in the 2024 presidential election. On 15 September 2022, Bukele officially announced that he was seeking re-election in 2024; his announcement was criticized by various lawyers, politicians, and journalists who argued that consecutive re-election violated the country's constitution. On 25 June 2023, Bukele officially registered himself as a Nuevas Ideas pre-candidate for the presidency. At the same time, Vice President Félix Ulloa registered as the party's pre-candidate for the vice presidency. On 9 July 2023, Bukele and Ulloa were officially confirmed to be the party's presidential and vice presidential candidate, respectively, receiving 44,398 votes.

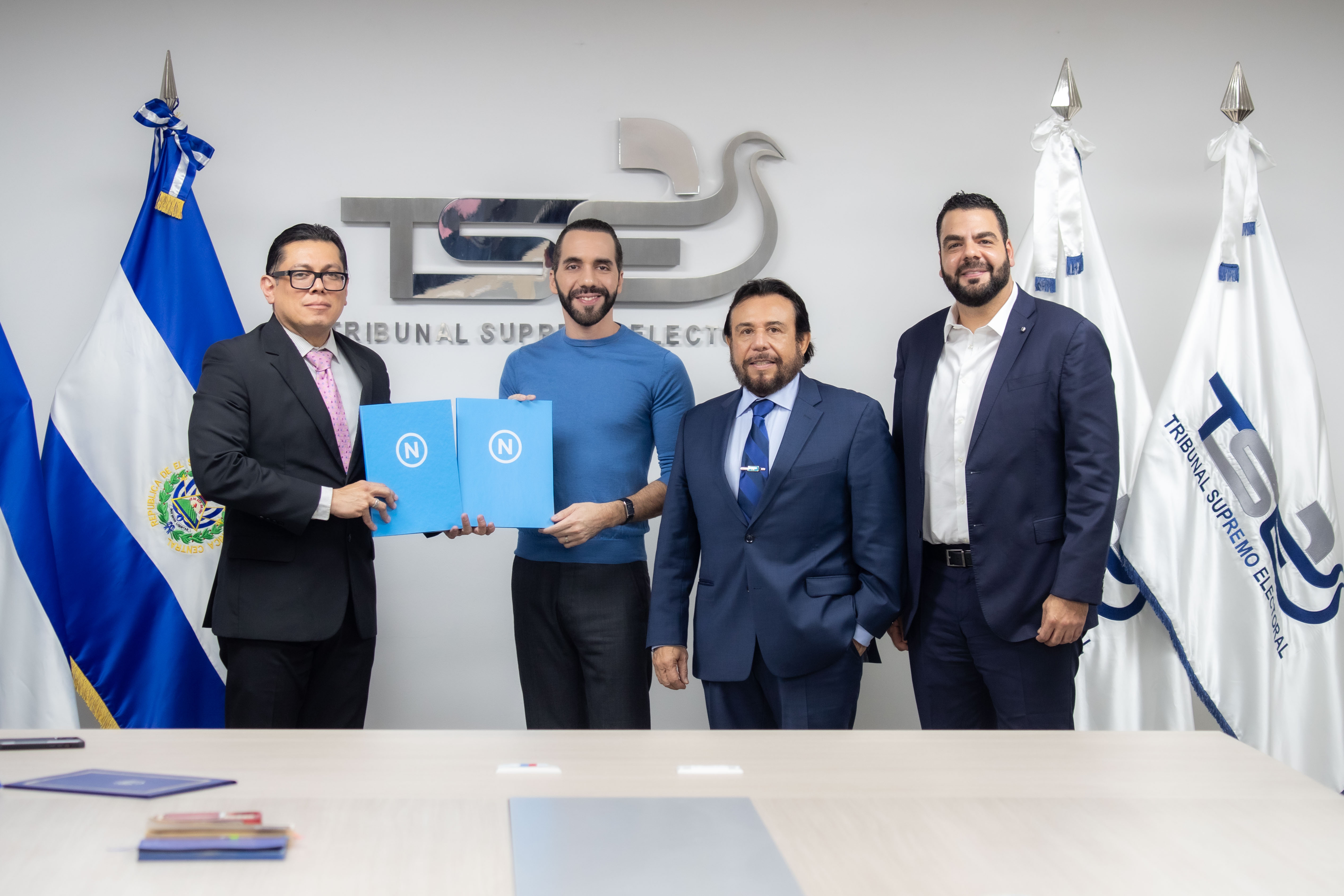
The registration of Bukele and Ulloa's 2024 candidacies with the TSE

The party originally scheduled to hold its primary elections on 2 July 2023, but after the reductions of municipalities and legislative seats was approved in June 2023, the party postponed its primary elections to 9 July 2023. In December 2022, Castro stated that Nuevas Ideas aimed to win 70 seats in the Legislative Assembly, but after the reduction of both seats in the Legislative Assembly and number of municipalities, Castro stated that the party aimed to win all 60 seats on the legislature and all 44 municipalities; Castro's revised projections were criticized by opposition politicians. During the primaries, Nuevas Ideas members voted to select the party's candidates for president, vice president, 60 deputies to the Legislative Assembly, 44 mayors, and 20 deputies to PARLACEN. On 26 October 2023, Nuevas Ideas officially began the process to register Bukele and Ulloa's presidential and vice presidential candidacies, respectively. Both of their candidacies were registered by the TSE on 3 November 2023 with four of the five TSE magistrates voting in favor. Their candidacies were approved amidst various requests by opposition groups to have their candidacies rejected. On 30 November 2023, the Legislative Assembly granted both Bukele and Ulloa leaves of absence so that they could both focus on their re-election campaign; the Legislative Assembly voted to appoint Claudia Rodríguez de Guevara, a member of Nuevas Ideas, as acting president.

Prior to the primaries, some members of Nuevas Ideas claimed that there were "irregularities" ("irregularidades") present in the party's primary elections. They criticized that the party was presenting single-candidate primaries and promoting Bukele's family members for municipal races. On 1 July 2023, the party's National Electoral Commission announced that it would open an internal investigation process to guarantee that the party's statutes and regulations were followed and that those who attempted to manipulate the electoral process would be punished and turned over to the country's legal system. On 31 July 2023, Nuevas Ideas suspended the legislative candidacy of Rebeca Santos after videos surfaced allegedly showing Santos' staffers soliciting party members for codes to vote in her favor. After Santos' candidacy was canceled and García resigned from the Legislative Assembly, both of their candidacies were replaced by Sandra Martínez and Norma Lobo, both incumbent deputies who failed to receive enough votes during the primaries.

In June 2023, some Nuevas Ideas politicians began to promote their electoral campaigns prior to the beginning of the official campaigning period outlined by the TSE for October 2023 to February 2024. Politicians posted images and messages on Twitter and purchased online advertising through Google Ads. Ruth Eleonora López, the chief of Cristosal's anti-corruption committee, criticized their campaigns as illegal, stating that they violated article 172 of the country's electoral code.

In the 2024 election, Bukele won re-election with a landslide margin, winning 84.65 percent of the vote. The party also won another supermajority in the Legislative Assembly, winning 54 of 60 seats. On 1 June 2024, Bukele was sworn in for the second five-year term.

In March 2025, Nuevas Ideas expelled José María Chicas, the mayor of San Salvador Este, from the party.

=== 2027 general election ===
In February 2026, Castro stated that Nuevas Ideas aimed to win all 60 seats in the Legislative Assembly in the 2027 legislative election and called on allies in the PDC and PCN to stand down. On 28 June, Bukele and Ulloa registered as pre-candidates for the presidency and vice presidency, respectively; on 12 July, the party formally nominated both.

== Ideology ==
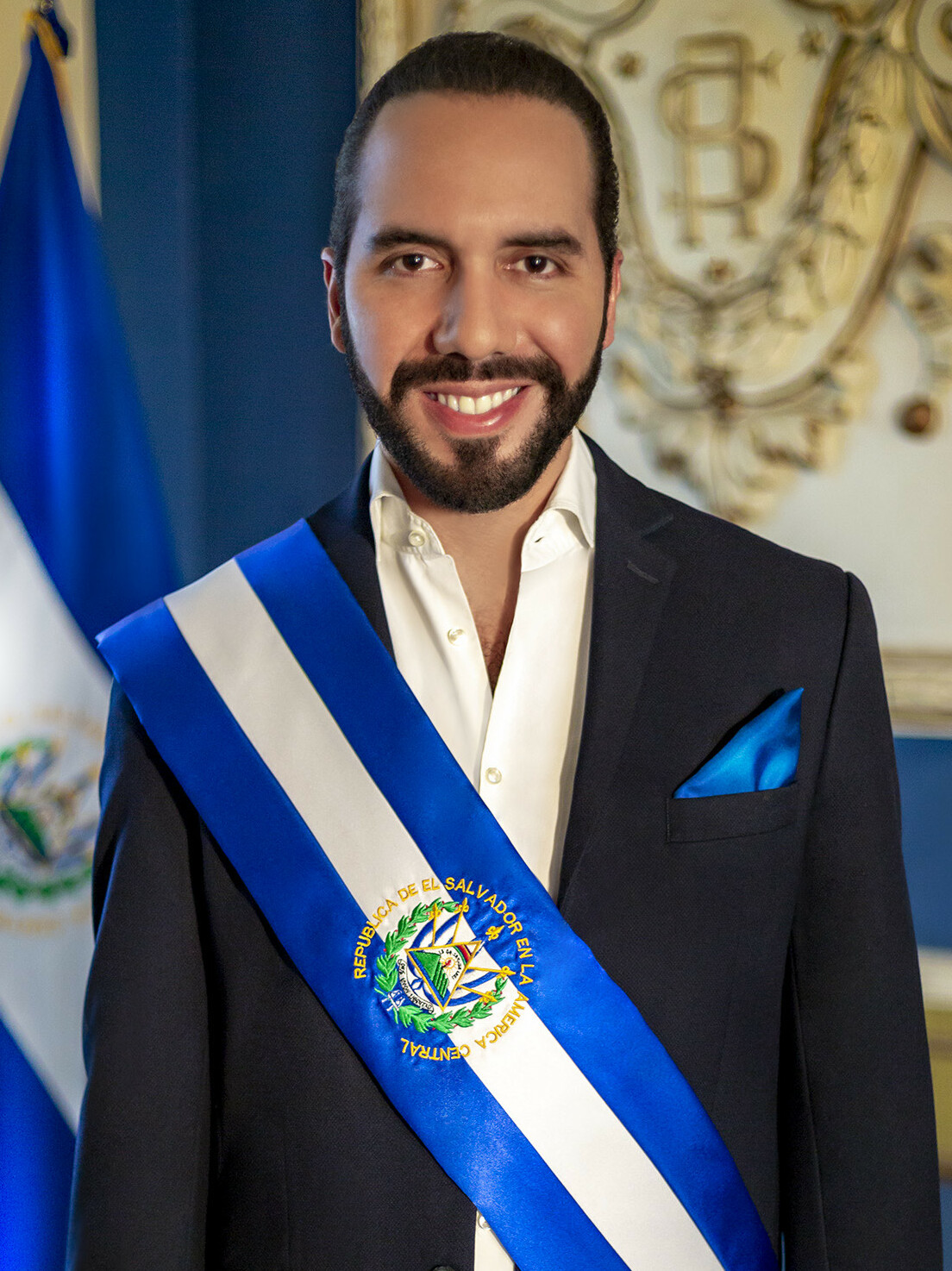
Nayib Bukele, the party's founder and leader.

In its party statutes, Nuevas Ideas describes itself as "democratic, decentralized, plural, inclusive, [and] without obsolete ideologies" ("democrático, descentralizado, plural, inclusivo, [y] sin ideologías obsoletas"). It also claims to fight for the rights of all citizens. Nuevas Ideas rejects both left and right-wing labels; Nuevas Ideas is a big tent political party, and Bukele portrays the party as a Third Way. Although the party has described itself as being progressive, Nuevas Ideas has also been described as being center-left, left-wing, conservative, center-right, right-wing, and far-right.

Bukele himself has also been described as a conservative politician, while he and his policies have been supported by conservatives abroad, particularly those from the United States and in Latin America.

Before the party gained political representation, Nuevas Ideas sought to disrupt what it perceived as the political status quo. The party's primary platform is combatting corruption, clientelism, and cronyism; a common phrase reiterated by Bukele and by Nuevas Ideas is "money is enough when nobody steals" ("el dinero alcanza cuando nadie roba"). Nuevas Ideas does not have any definite geopolitical positions regarding favoring relations with the United States or China. The party supports the reunification of Central America.

Nuevas Ideas has been described as a grassroots, anti-establishment, populist, and authoritarian political party. The party utilizes social media—among them, Facebook, YouTube, Twitter, Instagram, and TikTok—to communicate with and contact the public, spread pro-government and anti-opposition propaganda, and rally support among young voters.

Nuevas Ideas has been described as being Bukelist, adhering to Bukele's political ideology and agenda. According to Anna-Catherine Brigida and Mary Beth Sheridan of The Washington Post, the party is "based more on his [Bukele's] image and performance than on a traditional political ideology". Jonathan Blitzer of The New Yorker stated that Nuevas Ideas government officials, which he described as a "mixture of true believers and opportunists", are united in their loyalty to Bukele. He added that a senior United States official remarked that "Bukele is the Party". Óscar Picardo Joao of El Faro described Nuevas Ideas as a "cult of Bukele's personality" (culto a la personalidad de Bukele), adding that "[Bukele] is the center of everything, and everything starts from him and revolves around his agenda" ("[Bukele] es el centro de todo, y todo parte de él y gira en torno a su agenda").

== Symbols ==
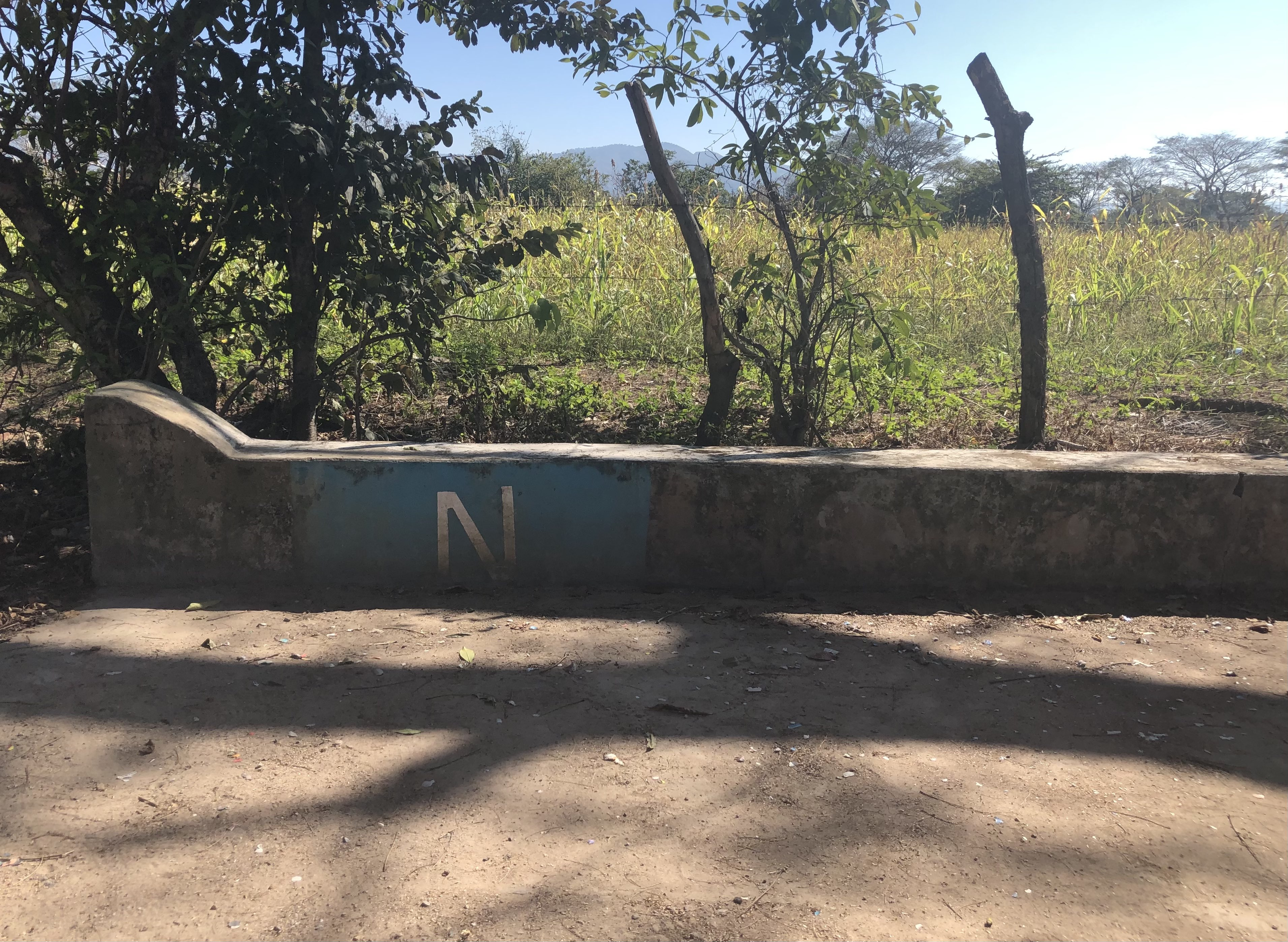
The N logo on a curb

Nuevas Ideas' primary color is cyan, specifically process cyan, and its secondary color is white. The party officially renders its name Nuevas Ideas in all caps in the Kollektif Bold font. Its logo is a capital letter N, also in the Kollektif Bold font. The party's "N" logo has been sometimes referred to as "the N of Nayib" ("la N de Nayib") or simply "the N" ("la N"). During Bukele's 2019 presidential campaign, Nuevas Ideas also used a logo consisting of the white silhouette of a swallow; the white swallow was the logo of GANA at the time.

== Party leadership ==
Although Bukele is the founder and leader of Nuevas Ideas, he does not hold an official position within Nuevas Ideas. The party's leadership structure consists of the presidency, the national council, and the national convention. The presidency holds political, executive, and administrative authority and exerts supervision over party affairs to achieve the party's goals; the national council defines the party's political strategy and ensures organizational functionality; the national convention ensures that all of the party's bodies, leaders, and members abide by its resolutions and agreements. In addition to the party's national leadership structure, Nuevas Ideas has smaller bodies and structures at the country's departmental and municipal levels.

Federico Gerardo Anliker López, a close friend of Bukele, was the party's first president (then known as the secretary-general), serving from 2018 to 2020. Yusef Bukele, one of Nayib Bukele's brothers, was considered to be a popular choice to succeed Anliker as the party's president but he declined to seek the position. In March 2020, Anliker was succeeded as the party's president by Xavier Zablah, a cousin of Bukele. Zablah won the party's internal election with 31,476 votes, defeating Isabel Monje's 3,806 votes and Israel Juárez's 868 votes.

Nuevas Ideas' headquarters is located at 21-A. Col. Miramonte on Bernal Avenue and Las Oscuranas Street in San Salvador, the country's capital city. As of 2019, the party has 507,633 members.

== Influence abroad ==
Nuevas Ideas has offices located in Guatemala and Honduras. In July 2021, Guatemalan lawyer José Luis Araneda Cintrón established a political party bearing Nuevas Ideas' which used its same cyan logo, beginning the process of registering the party with Guatemala's Supreme Electoral Court. Nuevas Ideas denied any association with the Guatemalan political party, and spokesman José Navarro told El Faro that "Nuevas Ideas is only here in El Salvador".

In 2018, the party established Nuevas Ideas USA, a branch of the party to rally support among Salvadorans living in the United States. Nuevas Ideas USA was coordinated by Luis Reyes from its formation until its dissolution in 2020 when it splintered into five groups based in California, Massachusetts, New Jersey, New York, and Washington, D.C. Prior to the 2024 election, various deputies of the Legislative Assembly from Nuevas Ideas held campaign events in the United States to promote Bukele's re-election campaign. Events have been held in Houston, Los Angeles, New York City, Uniondale, and Washington, D.C.

== Electoral history ==
=== Presidential elections ===
| Election | Candidate | First round | | | Second round | | | Result | Ref. |
| Election | Candidate | Votes | % | Pos. | Votes | % | Pos. | Result | Ref. |
|---|---|---|---|---|---|---|---|---|---|
| 2019 | Supported Nayib Bukele (Note: In the 2019 election, Bukele ran for president with GANA, as Nuevas Ideas had not yet been registered as a political party by the TSE.) | 1,434,856 | 53.10% | ▲1st | —N/a | | | Elected ✓ | |
| 2024 | Nayib Bukele | 2,701,725 | 84.65% | 1st | —N/a | | | Elected ✓ | |
| 2027 | Nayib Bukele | To be determined | | | Second round abolished | | | TBD | |

=== Legislative Assembly elections ===
| Election | Votes | % | Position | Seats | +/– | Status in legislature | Ref. |
|---|---|---|---|---|---|---|---|
| 2018 | Not registered | | | | | Extraparliamentary | |
| 2021 | 1,655,219 | 66.32 | ▲1st | 56 / 84 | New | Supermajority government | |
| 2024 | 2,200,332 | 70.56 | 1st | 54 / 60 | ▼2 | Supermajority government | |
| 2027 | To be determined | | | | | | |

=== Municipal elections ===
| Election | Votes | % | Position | Municipalities | +/– | Ref. |
|---|---|---|---|---|---|---|
| 2018 | Not registered | | | | | |
| 2021 | 1,342,968 | 50.78 | ▲1st | 152 / 262 | New | |
| 2024 | 632,245 | 39.12 | 1st | 28 / 44 | ▼124 | |
| 2027 | To be determined | | | | | |

=== PARLACEN elections ===
| Election | Votes | % | Position | Seats (Note: El Salvador is allocated 20 of the 120 seats in the Central American Parliament.) | +/– | Ref. |
|---|---|---|---|---|---|---|
| 2018 | Not registered | | | | | |
| 2021 | 1,693,551 | 68.11 | ▲1st | 14 / 20 | New | |
| 2024 | 799,433 | 53.75 | 1st | 13 / 20 | ▼1 | |

== See also ==
- List of political parties in El Salvador
- List of ruling political parties by country
- Law and order (politics)
- Penal populism
