= Central American Parliament =

Legislature of the Central American Integration System

Coordinates: 14.6158°N 90.5105°W

Central American Parliament Parlamento Centroamericano

Type
- Type: Unicameral

History
- Established: 28 October 1991; 35 years ago
- Preceded by: Contadora Group

Leadership
- President of the Central American Parliament: Karla Gutiérrez Herrera; Guatemala since October 2025

Structure
- Seats: 120
- Plenary Assembly political groups: Guatemala (20): VAMOS (5); UNE (4); SEMILLA (3); VIVA (2); VALOR-UNIONISTA (2); TODOS (1); NOSOTROS (1); VOS (1); URNG-MAIZ-WINAQ (1); El Salvador (20): Nuevas Ideas (13); ARENA (2); FMLN (2); GANA (1); PDC (1); PCN (1); Honduras (20): PNH (8); PLH (8); LIBRE (4); Panama (20): RM (9); PP (5); Independent candidates (2); PRD (1); Panameñista (1); Alianza (1); MOLIRENA (1); Dominican Republic (20): PRM and allies (12); PLD and allies (4); FP and allies (4)

Meeting place
- Guatemala City

Website
- www.parlacen.int (in Spanish)

The Central American Parliament (Spanish: Parlamento Centroamericano), also known as PARLACEN, is the political institution and parliamentary body of the Central American Integration System (SICA). Its headquarters are in Guatemala City.

== History ==
The PARLACEN's origins date back to the Contadora group, a project of the 1980s that sought to help resolve the civil wars in El Salvador, Guatemala, and Nicaragua. Although the Contadora group was disbanded in 1986, the idea of a greater Central American integration remained, giving rise to the Esquipulas II Agreement, which among other things, created the Central American Parliament. The Treaty establishing the Central American Parliament and other political bodies was signed in 1987; its first formal session was carried out on 28 October 1991 in Guatemala City.

The PARLACEN as a political body in the region is part of the Central American Integration System (SICA), established by the Protocol of Tegucigalpa to the Charter of the Organization of American States (ODECA) signed on 13 December 1991. SICA has the fundamental aim to realize an integration that is political and ideological representative in a pluralistic democratic system that guarantees free elections and participation under equal conditions for political parties.

The historic Declaration of Esquipulas I, which was adopted by the presidents of the Central American states in the city of Esquipulas, Guatemala on 25 May 1986, included the following declaration: "It is necessary to establish and complement activities that support understanding and cooperation with institutional structures. They shall make possible to strengthen the dialogue, the common development, democracy and pluralism as fundamental elements for peace in the region and the integration of Central America. Therefore the foundation of PARLACEN is necessary. Its members are elected freely by universal and direct elections through which the principle of political and participative pluralism is followed."

The agreement of PARLACEN and other political authorities was signed in October 1987 by Guatemala, El Salvador, Costa Rica, Nicaragua, and Honduras. In the beginning, it was an instrument which came into force for only three states (Guatemala, El Salvador and Honduras) on 1 May 1990. PARLACEN was formed on 28 October 1991 and has its head office in Guatemala City, Guatemala.

The Legislative Yuan, Taiwan's legislative body, was granted permanent observer status at PARLACEN in 1999. However PARLACEN signaled a shift in approach when on 28 April 2022 it made a statement to support a One China policy. The following year, on 21 August 2023, the PARLACEN Plenary Assembly voted to revoke the permanent observer status of Taiwan's legislative body and include China's National People's Congress as a permanent observer instead. The vote was made at the request of the Nicaraguan delegation which argued that "Taiwan lacks recognition as a sovereign state at the United Nations" and that the "observer status that Taiwan holds at PARLACEN is illegitimate due to lack of legal status", also noting a UN resolution concerning Chinese representation at the UN. The Chinese government welcomed the development.

== Legal status and mission ==
PARLACEN is the regional assembly of SICA and acts as a permanent political organ to represent opinions and to carry out analyses and discussions about political, economic and cultural affairs of common interest, of basic conditions for democracy, peace, and the integration of Central America, as well to work out initiatives for its realization. It is charged with furthering human rights and international law, to achieve a peaceful coexistence within the framework of security and social welfare, a mission which is well-founded in representative and participative democracy, in pluralism, and in respect for national legislation and international law.

PARLACEN has the status of a legal entity according to international law.

== Member states ==
A clickable Euler diagram showing the relationships between various multinational organizations in the Americas

The following countries compose the PARLACEN:

- Guatemala
- El Salvador
- Honduras
- Nicaragua
- Dominican Republic
- Panama

Between 1998 and 2010, the Dominican Republic sent 22 appointed members. Since 2010, it has been a full member of the Central American Parliament with delegates elected directly by universal suffrage. (See note)

On July 31, 2025, El Salvador’s Legislative Assembly passed a constitutional reform to officially withdraw from the Central American Parliament (PARLACEN). The move reflects a shift in the country’s foreign and regional strategy, citing PARLACEN’s limited legal authority and the desire to reduce public spending. This marks a clear departure from previous approaches to regional integration. As a result, El Salvador will stop electing representatives to the body starting with the 2027 legislative election.

On October 4, 2026, President of Nicaragua Daniel Ortega announced that Nicaragua would withdraw from PARCALEN.

=== Panama ===
President Ricardo Martinelli vowed that he would remove Panama from PARLACEN, fulfilling a campaign promise. On 11 December, 2009, law 78 passed withdrawing Panama from PARLACEN, but a resolution of the Central American Court of Justice declared the law unconstitutional. The court said there is no mechanism to withdraw from the PARLACEN and Panama could not opt out. In January 2012, the Panamanian Supreme Court re-affirmed that ruling and Panama returned to PARLACEN. Panama also showed more interest in membership after SICA signed a free trade agreement with the European Union.

=== Observer status ===
- China
- Mexico
- Venezuela
- Puerto Rico
- Morocco

=== Former observers ===
- Taiwan (1999 to 22 August 2023 upon its de-recognition by PARLACEN)

== Competences and tasks ==
The PARLACEN is the regional and permanent organ of political and democratic representation of SICA with the main purpose to realize the Central American integration.

=== Competencies ===
- Proposal of legislation concerning the integration.
- Democratic control of the integration.
- Initiatives to deepen and amplify the integration.

=== Tasks ===
- Promoting the process of integration and leading the way to the greatest possible cooperation between the Central American states.
- Proposing draft treaties and agreements which are to be negotiated by the Central American states and forming an opinion of what the SICA proposes.
- Creating special commissions to determine the discordances between the states that could affect the integration.
- Helping to consolidate a democratic, pluralistic, and participative form of government in the Central American states.
- Promoting the validity of international law.
- Knowing the official executive authorities of SICA.
- Knowing the budgets of the institutions of SICA.

== Bodies of PARLACEN ==
PARLACEN's organisational structure consists of the Plenum, the Board of Parliament, and the Secretary Office.

=== Plenum ===
The Plenum is the highest body of PARLACEN and includes all representatives. The committees and parliamentary parties are also involved with its tasks.

The responsibilities of the Plenum are the following:

- Advice to the presidents' assembly concerning affairs of peace, security of Central America, and development of the region.
- Annual election of the board of parliament.
- Approval of the budget of PARLACEN.
- Assessment and decision concerning the reports of the board of parliament.
- Composition and approval of internal decrees of PARLACEN and other necessary regulations.
- Formation of working commissions.
- Proposal of drafts of contracts and agreements that are to be negotiated between the states of Central America.
- Annual discharge of the boards of the parliamentary standing committees.
- Other tasks which are assigned to it by its constitutive contract or its additional instruments.

==== Parliamentary committees ====
The parliamentary committees are parliamentary authorities who – in order to draw up a corresponding report – are supposed to conduct studies and examinations which are either within their sphere of competence or are directed to them by the board or the Plenum.

The working committees of PARLACEN can be structured as follows.

Permanent commissions are established in the internal rules to work on affairs of the commission with unlimited duration. The permanent commissions are formed of at most two representatives per state, not exceeding twelve members in total.

As of 2015, there were thirteen permanent commissions:

- Commission of Agriculture, Fishing, Environment and Natural Resources
- Commission of Urban Development, Public Participation
- Commission of Education, Culture, Sports, Science and Technology
- Commission of Women, Children, Youth and Family
- Commission of Macroeconomics and Finance
- Commission of Tourism
- Commission of International Relations and Migration Affairs
- Commission of Health, Social Security, Population, Labour and Corporation Affairs
- Commission of Peace, Public Security and Human Rights
- Commission of Integration, Trade and Economic Development
- Commission of Legal Affairs and Regional Institutions
- Commission of Politics and Party Affairs
- Commission of Indigenous Peoples and Afro Descendants

There is also a delegation of EUROLAT.

Extraordinary commissions are established by the Plenum for affairs that are of special importance and institutional significance for PARLACEN as well as for the process of integration.

Special commissions are established by the board of parliament to handle special affairs.

==== Parliamentary groups ====
The parliamentary groups monitor the political trend of the Central American representatives and are organized according to the political orientation of their groups.

The parliamentary groups are founded by the adoption of an internal statute by the plenary assembly. The board of parliament registers each parliamentary group. The statute is published and states the group's ideological principles, the political objectives and the regulations.

There are three parliamentary groups: the Parliamentary Group of the Left, Center-Democratic Integration Group, and Democratic Integrationist Union.

=== Board of parliament ===
The board of parliament is the executive body for decisions that emerge from the Plenum and is the administrative body of PARLACEN. It is expandable according to its internal rules.

The board of parliament is elected from the members. Its term is one year, made up of one president, five vice-presidents, and six secretaries.

The board makes its decisions by approval of a majority of its members. In the event of a tie, the votes of the presidency count as qualified majority. The presidency is filled by a rota system corresponding to the alphabetical order of the member states, starting with the state which holds the head office.

It is possible to appeal any resolution at the Plenum.

The tasks of the board are

- Consideration and handling of all requests for which PARLACEN is in charge.
- Conveying of the invitations for the ordinary and extraordinary meetings of the Plenum of PARLACEN.
- Draft of the budget – designated in Central American Pesos – for the routine work of PARLACEN.
- Realizing the resolutions of PARLACEN.
- Handing in the annual report about the execution of its duties and the result of its administration to the plenary as well as the report about the budget.
- Management and control of the secretary office and appointment of necessary personnel. Here, the equal treatment of all Central American states has to be taken into consideration.
- Handling of the economic and organizational affairs which affect PARLACEN.
- Proposal to the Plenum of regulating instruments which are required by the internal order.
- Creation of special commissions to carry out a task or realize a special function.
- Proper filling in of vacancies that occur in absence of a representative.
- Calling of the deputy representative in case of vacancies.
- Proposal of a suitable list of candidates for the appointment of the internal and external accountants of PARLACEN to the plenary.
- Formation of delegations for official missions. This has to be done in accordance to the regulating norms for the integration of special missions of PARLACEN.
- Establishing its own internal rules
- Dividing tasks among its members.
- Other tasks which are assigned to the board by the constitutive contract or by additional instruments.

=== Secretary office ===
The secretary office is the technical-administrative organ of PARLACEN and is divided into three sections, which have the following basic functions and responsibilities:

The secretary office for parliamentary affairs handles and obeys the decisions of PARLACEN. It reports to the Plenum on a regular basis and is of technical assistance to the Plenum as well as to the commissions in all of their activities. It coordinates and manages the advice of the commissions and has to assist the extended board with developing the agenda for Plenum meetings when necessary.

The secretary office for administration and finance has to administer all branches, manager's offices, departments and administrative units, as well as the personnel of PARLACEN, and has to control the proper administration of its resources.

The secretary office of the board offers technical help to the board in questions relating to the responsibilities of and the topics determined by the board.

== Presidents of PARLACEN ==
President	Term in office	Country
Roberto Carpio Nicolle	October 1991 – October 1992	Guatemala
Ilsa Díaz Zelaya	October 1992 – October 1993	Honduras
José Francisco Merino López	October 1993 – July 1994	El Salvador
Víctor Augusto Vela Mena	July 1994 – October 1994	Guatemala
Roland Valenzuela Oyuela	October 1994 – December 1995	Honduras
Raúl Zaldívar Guzmán	December 1995 – October 1996	Honduras
Ernesto Lima Mena	October 1996 – October 1997	El Salvador
Marco Antonio Solares Pérez	October 1997 – October 1998	Guatemala
Carlos Roberto Reina	October 1998 – October 1999	Honduras
José Ernesto Somarriba Sosa	October 1999 – October 2000	Nicaragua
Hugo Guiraud Gargano	October 2000 – October 2001	Panama
Rodrigo Samayoa Rivas	October 2001 – October 2002	El Salvador
Victor Augusto Vela Mena	October 2002 – October 2003	Guatemala
Mario Facussé Handal	October 2003 – October 2004	Honduras
Fabio Gadea Mantilla	October 2004 – October 2005	Nicaragua
Julio Enrique Palacios Sambrano	October 2005 – October 2006	Panama
Ciro Cruz Zepeda	October 2006 – October 2007	El Salvador
Julio Guillermo González Gamarra	October 2007 – October 2008	Guatemala
Gloria Guadalupe Oquelí Solórzano de Macoto	October 2008 – October 2009	Honduras
Jacinto José Suárez Espinoza	October 2009 – October 2010	Nicaragua
Dorindo Jayan Cortez Marciaga	October 2010 – October 2011	Panama
Manolo Pichardo	October 2011 – October 2012	Dominican Republic
Leonel Búcaro	October 2012 – October 2013	El Salvador
Paula Rodríguez	October 2013 – October 2014	Guatemala
Armando Bardales	October 2014 – October 2015	Honduras
José Antonio Alvarado Correa	October 2015 – October 2016	Nicaragua
Priscilla Weeden de Miró	October 2016 – October 2017	Panama
Tony Raful Tejada	October 2017 – October 2018	Dominican Republic
Irma Segunda Amaya Echeverría	October 2018 – October 2019	El Salvador
Juan Alfonso Fuentes Soria	October 2019 – January 2020	Guatemala
Nadia de León Torres	January 2020 – October 2020	Guatemala
Fanny Carolina Salinas Fernández	October 2020 – October 2021	Honduras
Guillermo Daniel Ortega Reyes	October 2021 – October 2022	Nicaragua
Amado Cerrud Acevedo	October 2022 – October 2023	Panama
Silvia García Polanco	October 2023 – October 2024	Dominican Republic

== Composition ==
An aggregated map displaying the composition

Country	Party	Seats	Last election	Next election	Ref.
Dominican Republic	Modern Revolutionary Party	12	19 May 2024	2028	
Dominican Republic	People's Force	4	19 May 2024	2028	
Dominican Republic	Dominican Liberation Party	4	19 May 2024	2028	
Dominican Republic	Total:	20	19 May 2024	2028	
El Salvador	Nuevas Ideas	13	3 March 2024	Withdrawing from PARLACEN	
El Salvador	Nationalist Republican Alliance	2	3 March 2024	Withdrawing from PARLACEN	
El Salvador	Farabundo Martí National Liberation Front	2	3 March 2024	Withdrawing from PARLACEN	
El Salvador	Grand Alliance for National Unity	2	3 March 2024	Withdrawing from PARLACEN	
El Salvador	Christian Democratic Party	1	3 March 2024	Withdrawing from PARLACEN	
El Salvador	Total:	20	3 March 2024	Withdrawing from PARLACEN	
Guatemala	Vamos	5	25 June 2023	June 2027	
Guatemala	National Unity of Hope	4	25 June 2023	June 2027	
Guatemala	Semilla	3	25 June 2023	June 2027	
Guatemala	Vision with Values	2	25 June 2023	June 2027	
Guatemala	Valor–Unionist Party	2	25 June 2023	June 2027	
Guatemala	Todos	1	25 June 2023	June 2027	
Guatemala	Will, Opportunity and Solidarity	1	25 June 2023	June 2027	
Guatemala	Nosotros	1	25 June 2023	June 2027	
Guatemala	Guatemalan National Revolutionary Unity–Winaq	1	25 June 2023	June 2027	
Guatemala	Total:	20	25 June 2023	June 2027	
Honduras	Liberal Party of Honduras	8	20 November 2025	2029	
Honduras	National Party of Honduras	8	20 November 2025	2029	
Honduras	Liberty and Refoundation	4	20 November 2025	2029	
Honduras	Total:	20	20 November 2025	2029	
Nicaragua	Sandinista National Liberation Front	15	7 November 2021	Withdrawing from PARLACEN	
Nicaragua	Constitutionalist Liberal Party	2	7 November 2021	Withdrawing from PARLACEN	
Nicaragua	Nicaraguan Liberal Alliance	1	7 November 2021	Withdrawing from PARLACEN	
Nicaragua	Independent Liberal Party	1	7 November 2021	Withdrawing from PARLACEN	
Nicaragua	Alliance for the Republic	1	7 November 2021	Withdrawing from PARLACEN	
Nicaragua	Total:	20	7 November 2021	Withdrawing from PARLACEN	
Panama	Realizing Goals	9	5 May 2024	2029	
Panama	People's Party	5	5 May 2024	2029	
Panama	Democratic Revolutionary Party	1	5 May 2024	2029	
Panama	Panameñista Party	1	5 May 2024	2029	
Panama	Alliance Party	1	5 May 2024	2029	
Panama	Nationalist Republican Liberal Movement	1	5 May 2024	2029	
Panama	Independent	2	5 May 2024	2029	
Panama	Total:	20	5 May 2024	2029	
Total:		120	(Honduras) 2025	(Guatemala) 2027	

== Elections ==
The 20 elected members representing every member state the Central American Parliament are elected at the same time as the presidential elections of the member state according to article 2 of the Internal Regulations of the Central American Parliament. The former president of every member state, as well as every vice-president and prime minister, are also de jure members of the PARLACEN from the end of their term till the end of their successor's term.

== Effectiveness and challenges ==
Costa Rica, one of the wealthier countries in the region and an otherwise-active participant in the SICA, has not ratified the Esquipulas II agreement, and is not represented in the Parlacen. Parlacen is seen by some (including former President of Honduras Ricardo Maduro) as a white elephant.

== 2007 murder of parliamentary members ==
On 19 February 2007, a group of three Salvadoran representatives were murdered by four Guatemalan police officers, including the head of the Guatemalan National Police organized crime unit. The killers were arrested three days later and detained in a Guatemalan prison, where they were themselves murdered several days later by a group of gunmen disguised as prison guards. Guatemalan president Óscar Berger attributed the officers' murders to an apparent mafia hit aimed at hindering investigation into the representatives' murders. The killings raised questions regarding corruption and drug trafficking in Central America as well as the high level of infiltration of the Guatemalan national police force by organized crime.

== See also ==
- Andean Parliament
- Latin American Parliament
- Mercosur Parliament
