= 2024 Salvadoran legislative election =

- 4 February and 3 March 2024
- All 60 seats in the Legislative Assembly; 31 seats needed for a majority
- Turnout: 52.02% (▲1.77pp)
Party	Leader	Vote %	Seats	+/–
NI	Xavier Zablah Bukele	70.56	54	−2
ARENA	Carlos García Saade	7.29	2	−12
PCN	Manuel Rodríguez	3.26	2	0
PDC	Reinaldo Carballo	2.99	1	0
Vamos	Cesia Rivas	2.94	1	0
This lists parties that won seats. See the complete results below.
Results by department
President of the Legislative Assembly before	President of the Legislative Assembly after
Ernesto Castro; NI	Ernesto Castro; NI

Legislative elections were held in El Salvador in February and March 2024. In the first round on 4 February, voters elected all 60 deputies of the Legislative Assembly. In the second round on 3 March, voters elected mayors and municipal councils (Note: The number of members on the municipal councils vary per department. Of the 44 municipalities, 2 have 15 members, 2 have 13 members, and 40 have 9 members. The councils themselves consist of 1 trustee, 4 (or 8 or 10) proprietary aldermen, and 4 substitute aldermen.) for all 44 of the country's municipalities and all 20 of El Salvador's deputies to the Central American Parliament (PARLACEN). (Note: Of the 120 seats in the Central American Parliament, El Salvador is allotted 20 seats. The remaining 100 seats were divided among the Dominican Republic, Guatemala, Honduras, Nicaragua, and Panama.)

The Supreme Electoral Court (TSE) allowed 13 political parties to participate in the election. Of those, ten parties participated in the Legislative Assembly election, eleven in the municipal elections, and nine in the PARLACEN election. Opinion polling indicated significant leads for Nuevas Ideas, the political party of President Nayib Bukele (who was seeking re-election in the concurrent presidential election), in the legislative and municipal elections. In December 2022, Bukele suggested reducing the number of municipalities and, in June 2023, the Legislative Assembly approved his proposals to reduce the number of municipalities from 262 to 44 and the number of seats in the Legislative Assembly from 84 to 60. The reductions were criticized by lawyers, economists, and opposition politicians as gerrymandering, undemocratic, and an attempt to consolidate the government's power.

Nuevas Ideas won 54 seats. Its allies—the Christian Democratic Party and the National Coalition Party—won an additional 3 seats, while the opposition, consisting of the Nationalist Republican Alliance and Vamos won the last 3 seats. Nuevas Ideas won 28 municipalities, its allies won an additional 15 municipalities, and the opposition won 1 municipality. The elected deputies, mayors, and municipal councils assumed office on 1 May.

== Background ==
=== Reduction of municipalities and legislative seats ===
Maps of the country's municipalities before (top) and after (bottom) the reductions

On 30 December 2022, Salvadoran president Nayib Bukele tweeted that he believed the country's 262 municipalities should be reduced to only 50, claiming that it was "absurd that 21,000 km^{2} are divided into 262 municipalities" ("absurdo que 21,000 kms^{2} estén divididos en 262 alcaldías"). (Note: 21,000 km^{2} is approximately 8,100 sq mi.) Various economists, lawyers, and politicians argued that the proposed reduction was an attempt to consolidate power through gerrymandering, would grant Nuevas Ideas an electoral advantage, and would lead to data manipulation to favor the government.

In February 2023, Ernesto Castro, the president of the Legislative Assembly, confirmed that Nuevas Ideas was considering reducing the number of deputies in the Legislative Assembly from 84 to 64 and the number of municipalities from 252 to 50. Claudia Ortiz, a deputy from Vamos, criticized the announcement and remarked that the proposed reforms could help Nuevas Ideas form a one-party state. She also argued that the time to make electoral reforms had passed and that the changes would violate Article 291-A of the electoral code that prohibits electoral reforms up to one year before an election. On 15 March, the Legislative Assembly voted to repeal Article 291-A.

On 1 June 2023, Bukele formally proposed legislation to reduce the number of municipalities from 262 to 44 and the number of seats in the Legislative Assembly from 84 to 60. Regarding the municipal reduction, he stated that the present municipalities would be transformed into districts. Regarding the legislative reduction, he stated that the number of seats would return to the number that were present before the 1992 Chapultepec Peace Accords that ended the Salvadoran Civil War. The Legislative Assembly approved the legislative reduction on 7 June and the municipal reduction on 13 June. Both reductions would go into effect on 1 May 2024. ARENA stated that the reductions were a "tactic to swing the electoral field in [Nuevas Ideas'] favor" ("táctica para inclinar la cancha electoral a su favor"). Óscar Ortiz, the secretary-general of the FMLN, described the proposals as "institutional fraud" for occurring during the lead up to the 2024 election.

Results of the reductions by department
Department	Legislative Assembly			Municipalities		
Department	2021	2024	+/–	2021	2024	+/–
Ahuachapán	4	3	–1	12	3	–9
Cabañas	3	2	–1	9	2	–7
Chalatenango	3	2	–1	33	3	–30
Cuscatlán	3	2	–1	16	2	–14
La Libertad	10	7	–3	22	6	–16
La Paz	4	3	–1	22	3	–19
La Unión	3	2	–1	18	2	–16
Morazán	3	2	–1	26	2	–24
San Miguel	6	5	–1	20	3	–17
San Salvador	24	16	–8	19	5	–14
San Vicente	3	2	–1	13	2	–11
Santa Ana	7	5	–2	13	4	–9
Sonsonate	6	5	–1	16	4	–12
Usulután	5	4	–1	23	3	–20
Total	84	60	–24	262	44	–218

== Electoral system ==
=== Election procedure ===
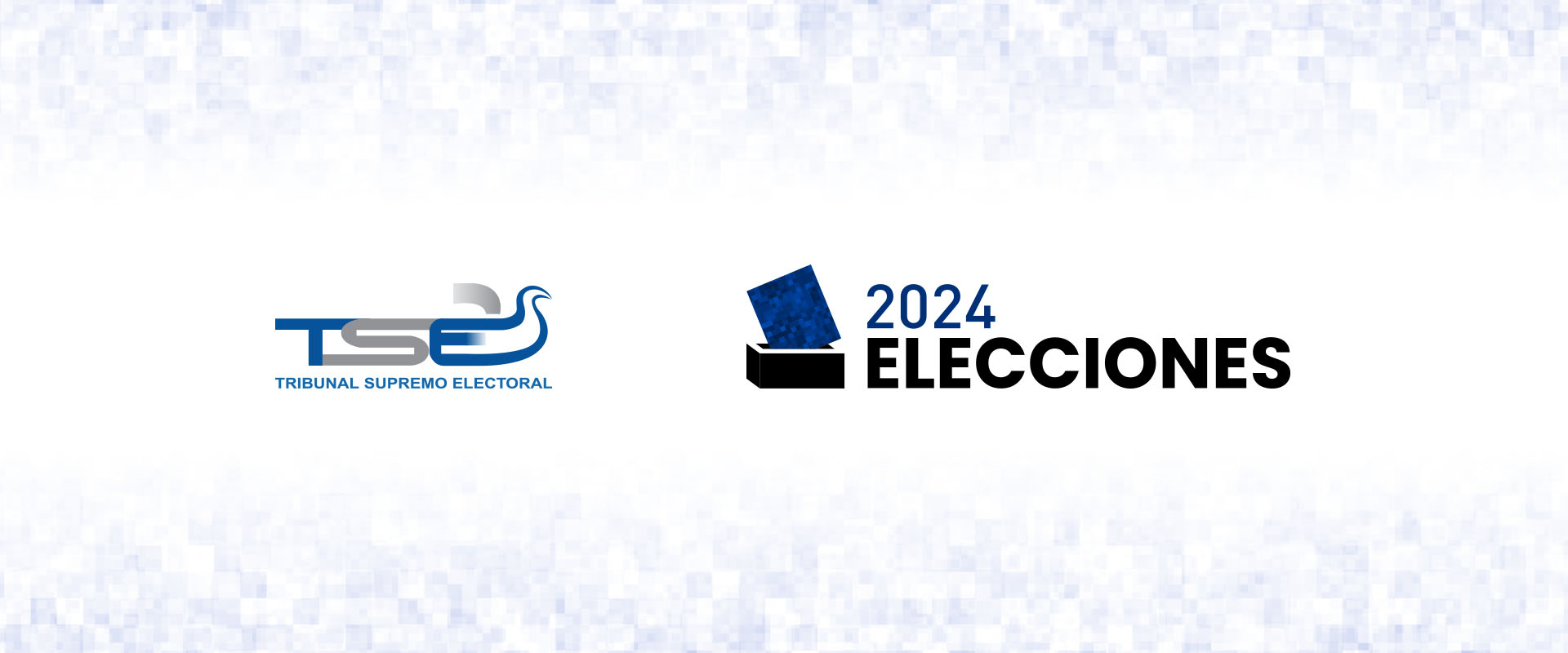
The TSE's 2024 election website banner

Legislative and municipal elections were scheduled to be held in El Salvador three years after the 2021 legislative election. All 60 Legislative Assembly deputies, 44 mayors and municipal councils of the country's municipalities (second-level subdivisions), and 20 Central American Parliament deputies were elected through a popular vote. El Salvador's constitution mandated that the election would be "free, direct, equal and secret". The Legislative Assembly election was held on 4 February 2024, concurrent with the presidential election. The elections for the 44 municipalities and the Central American Parliament were held on 3 March 2024.

Voting was held from 7 a.m. to 5 p.m. CST. A total of 1,595 voting centers were available across the country. Voting was not compulsory. Electronic voting for Salvadoran expatriates began at midnight on 6 January 2024. (Note: On 18 October 2022, the Legislative Assembly passed the a law that allowed Salvadorans living outside of the country to vote electronically in the Legislative Assembly election and the concurrent presidential election, but not the municipal or PARLACEN elections.) Expatriates were able to vote at 81 voting centers in 60 of the country's embassies and consulates in 30 countries. For the legislative election, votes cast from outside of the country were counted towards selecting deputies in the department of San Salvador. Guillermo Wellman, a magistrate of the TSE, stated that individuals arrested during the country's gang crackdown were ineligible to vote. There were a total of 6,214,399 registered voters.

Deputies of the Legislative Assembly were elected by the D'Hondt method, which was changed in June 2023 from the hare quota largest remainders method used in previous elections. Mayors, municipal council members, and Central American Parliament deputies were elected by open list proportional representation. The 60 deputies of the Legislative Assembly were elected in 14 constituencies for the country's 14 departments (first-level subdivisions), the 44 mayors and municipal councils were elected for each constituency, and the 20 Central American Parliament deputies were elected from one nationwide constituency.

Legislative candidates had to be at least 25 years old while municipal candidates had to be at least 21 years old. All candidates had to have been Salvadoran citizens by birth. Per article 38 of the Law of Political Parties, at least 30 percent of a party's total candidates for the legislative, municipal, and PARLACEN elections must be women. In addition to the 60 deputies elected to the Legislative Assembly and the 20 deputies elected to PARLACEN (referred to as proprietary deputies), an additional 60 substitute deputies were elected to the Legislative Assembly and 20 substitute deputies were elected to PARLACEN. Voters in each of the 44 municipalities elected 1 mayor and a varying number of members to the municipal council. Each municipal council consisted of 1 trustee, 4 proprietary aldermen, and 4 substitute alderman, however, two municipalities elected 8 proprietary alderman and two more elected 10 proprietary alderman due to those municipalities' larger size. In total, 624 people were elected to hold public office in the 2024 elections, a decrease from 3,206 in 2021.

=== Political parties ===
Political parties must be registered with the TSE to be able to participate in elections. The following table shows the thirteen political parties that were eligible to participate in the 2024 election.

Party		Leader	2021 results		
Party		Leader	Legislative	Municipal	PARLACEN
PDC	Christian Democratic Party; Partido Demócrata Cristiano	Reinaldo Carballo	1 / 84	3 / 262	0 / 20
CD	Democratic Change; Cambio Democrático	Javier Milián	0 / 84	0 / 262	0 / 20
FMLN	Farabundo Martí National Liberation Front; Frente Farabundo Martí para la Liberación Nacional	Óscar Ortiz	4 / 84	30 / 262	1 / 20
GANA	Grand Alliance for National Unity; Gran Alianza por la Unidad Nacional	Nelson Guardado	5 / 84	27 / 262	1 / 20
V	Let's Go; Vamos	Cesia Rivas	1 / 84	1 / 262	Did not run
PCN	National Coalition Party; Partido de Concertación Nacional	Manuel Rodríguez	2 / 84	14 / 262	1 / 20
ARENA	Nationalist Republican Alliance; Alianza Republicana Nacionalista	Carlos García Saade	14 / 84	35 / 262	3 / 20
NI	New Ideas; Nuevas Ideas	Xavier Zablah Bukele	56 / 84	152 / 262	14 / 20
NT	Our Time; Nuestro Tiempo	Andy Failer	1 / 84	0 / 262	Did not run
DS	Salvadoran Democracy; Democracia Salvadoreña	Adolfo Salume Artiñano	0 / 84	Did not run	
PAIS	Salvadoran Independent Party; Partido Independiente Salvadoreño	Roy García	New party		
FPS	Salvadoran Patriotic Fraternity; Fraternidad Patriota Salvadoreña	Óscar Morales Lemus	Did not run		
FS	Solidary Force; Fuerza Solidaria	Rigoberto Soto	New party		

== Legislative candidates ==
Nuevas Ideas held a majority in the 13th Legislative Assembly; GANA, the PDC, and the PCN supported Nuevas Ideas' government. The opposition consisted of ARENA, the FMLN, Nuestro Tiempo, and Vamos. Within the Central American Parliament, the fifteen deputies from Nuevas Ideas and GANA belong to the Center-Democratic Integration Group, the four deputies from ARENA and the PCN belong to the Integrationist Democratic Unity, and the sole FMLN deputy belongs to the Parliamentary Group of the Left.

In the years following the 2021 legislative election, three deputies and twenty-two mayors from ARENA left the party and become independents, as had eleven mayors from the FMLN, and one deputy and two mayors from GANA.

=== Retiring deputies ===
Eighteen deputies elected to the Legislative Assembly in 2021 did not run for re-election in 2024 because they chose to run for another office, were eliminated during their party's primary elections, were suspended by their party prior to the election, or they chose not to seek public office in 2024.

Party	Retiring deputy	Department	Serving since	Ref.
Nationalist Republican Alliance	Alberto Armando Romero Rodríguez	Cuscatlán	1 May 2006	
Nationalist Republican Alliance	Rodrigo Ávila Avilés	La Libertad	1 May 2015	
Nationalist Republican Alliance	Ana María Margarita Escobar López	San Salvador	1 May 2009	
Nationalist Republican Alliance	René Alfredo Portillo Cuadra	San Salvador	1 May 2015	
Nationalist Republican Alliance	José Javier Palomo Nieto	Santa Ana	1 May 2015	
Nuevas Ideas	Rodil Amílcar Ayala Nerio	Cabañas	1 May 2021	
Nuevas Ideas	José Ilofio García Torres	Cabañas	1 May 2021	
Nuevas Ideas	Erick Alfredo García Salguero	La Libertad	1 May 2021	
Nuevas Ideas	Rebeca Aracely Santos de González	La Libertad	1 May 2021	
Nuevas Ideas	Marcela Balbina Pineda Erazo	La Paz	1 May 2021	
Nuevas Ideas	Edwin Antonio Serpas Ibarra	La Unión	1 May 2021	
Nuevas Ideas	Carlos Hermann Bruch Cornejo	San Salvador	1 May 2021	
Nuevas Ideas	Iris Ivonne Hernández González	San Salvador	1 May 2021	
Nuevas Ideas	Aronnette Rebeca Mencía Díaz	San Salvador	1 May 2021	
Nuevas Ideas	José Asunción Urbina Alvarenga	San Salvador	1 May 2021	
Nuevas Ideas	Gerardo Balmore Aguilar Soriano	San Vicente	1 May 2021	
Nuevas Ideas	Jorge Alberto Castro Valle	Santa Ana	1 May 2021	
Nuestro Tiempo	John Tennant Wright Sol	San Salvador	1 May 2021	

== Election campaign ==
=== Nuevas Ideas ===
According to Ernesto Castro, the majority of Nuevas Ideas' deputies were seeking re-election. During the primaries, 60 legislative candidates, 44 municipal candidates, and 20 PARLACEN candidates were also confirmed. Nuevas Ideas formed one municipal coalition with GANA for San Miguel Centro and two municipal coalitions with Democratic Change for Sonsonate Oeste and Santa Ana Norte.

=== Nationalist Republican Alliance ===
On 16 July 2023, the Nationalist Republican Alliance elected 42 municipal candidates and 60 candidates to the Legislative Assembly. According to Citizen Action, ARENA stated that it would not disclose its entire list of candidates due to alleged threats made against its candidates for participating in the elections.

=== Farabundo Martí National Liberation Front ===
In July 2023, Ángel Monge, a member of the FMLN's political commission, stated that the FMLN would not form coalitions for the Legislative Assembly but would still consider forming coalitions for the municipal elections. The party elected 44 municipal candidates and 60 candidates for the Legislative Assembly from all 14 departments on 16 July 2023. According to Citizen Action, the FMLN stated that it would not disclose its entire list of candidates due to alleged threats made against its candidates for participating in the elections.

=== Grand Alliance for National Unity ===
The Grand Alliance for National Unity (GANA) formed one municipal coalition with Nuevas Ideas for San Miguel Centro and one municipal coalition with the PCN for Chalatenango Centro. Unlike in the 2021 election, GANA did not form coalitions with Nuevas Ideas for the Legislative Assembly elections.

=== National Coalition Party ===
The PCN formed a coalition with the Christian Democratic Party (Partido Demócrata Cristiano, or PDC) to jointly contest both legislative seats of Morazán. It also formed a coalition with the Citizen Power civil movement for legislative seats and municipalities in San Salvador. The coalition is unofficial as Citizen Power is not a registered political party. The PCN formed one municipal coalition with GANA for Chalatenango Centro and two municipal coalitions with the PDC for the Morazán Norte and Morazán Sur.

=== Christian Democratic Party ===
The PDC formed a coalition with the PCN to jointly contest both of Morazán's legislative, as well as the seats for both the Morazán Norte and Morazán Sur municipalities. The PDC disclosed its full list of 20 legislative, 23 municipal, and 2 PARLACEN candidates on 24 September.

=== Vamos ===
Sofía Vaquerano, legal secretary of Vamos, stated that the party would not form coalitions with individuals who had been accused of being corrupt. Initially, Claudia Ortiz stated that the party was open to forming a coalition with other parties, but later stated that the party would not seek any political coalition.

=== Other parties ===
The Salvadoran Independent Party (PAIS) legislative, municipal, and PARLACEN candidates to the TSE, however, Roy García (the party's leader) stated on Facebook that this announcement was not legitimate and that all of the party's candidates were invalid. He added that the party should wait and reorganize for the 2027 legislative election. On 4 October, the TSE passed a resolution to deregister the party and bar it from participating in the 2024 election.

Solidary Force formed a municipal coalition with Democratic Change for Usulután Oeste. The Salvadoran Patriotic Fraternity (FPS) did not register any legislative candidates. but it did register 20 PARLACEN candidates. Democratic Change formed two municipal coalitions with Nuevas Ideas for Sonsonate Oeste and Santa Ana Norte and one municipal coalition with Solidary Force for Usulután Oeste. Salvadoran Democracy did not participate in the 2024 election.

Registration for independent candidates began on 5 May 2023 and ended on 5 September. Manuel Meléndez was the only independent to begin registration with the TSE, however, he abandoned the registration process on 16 August.

== Opinion polls ==
Various groups such as CIESCA, Fundaungo, La Prensa Gráfica, TResearch, and UFG conducted opinion polling prior to the 2024 presidential election; virtually every poll indicated significant leads for Nuevas Ideas.

Local regression of polls conducted for the 2024 Salvadoran legislative election

== Results ==
=== Legislative Assembly results ===
Composition of the Legislative Assembly after the 2024 election (top) and its composition had the electoral reforms of June 2023 not occurred (bottom)

The TSE published the legislative election's final results on 18 February; Nuevas Ideas won 54 out of 60 seats, a supermajority. ARENA and the PCN both won two seats while Vamos and the PDC each won one seat. The FMLN, GANA, and Nuestro Tiempo lost all of their seats in the Legislative Assembly, while the Democratic Change and Solidary Force parties failed to win any seats. Additionally, Nuestro Tiempo and Democratic Change failed to receive more than 50,000 votes and could possibly lose registration with the TSE per article 47, section C of the Law of Political Parties, which mandates the dissolution of such parties.

On 25 February 2024, Citizen Action published its findings regarding what the results of the legislative election would have been had the Hare quota (largest remainder method remained) in place, the Legislative Assembly had not been reduced from 84 to 60 seats, and the votes from expatriates had not been considered—the manner in which previous legislative elections were conducted prior to the June 2023 electoral reforms. According to the group's findings, the composition of the Legislative Assembly would have been: Nuevas Ideas with 60 seats, ARENA with 7, the FMLN with 6, GANA and Vamos with 3 each, the PCN and PDC with 2 each, and Nuestro Tiempo with 1. According to Citizen Action, the electoral reforms only benefited Nuevas Ideas. It also concluded that, even without the results, the party and its allies would have retained a two-thirds majority.

A parliament diagram chart depicting the results of the 2024 Salvadoran legislative election totaling 60 seats
Party	Votes	%	Seats	+/–
Nuevas Ideas	2,200,332	70.56	54	–2
Nationalist Republican Alliance	227,357	7.29	2	–12
Farabundo Martí National Liberation Front	195,920	6.28	0	–4
National Coalition Party	101,641	3.26	2	+1
Grand Alliance for National Unity	99,344	3.19	0	–5
Christian Democratic Party	93,108	2.99	1	0
Vamos	91,675	2.94	1	0
Solidary Force	51,021	1.64	0	New
Nuestro Tiempo	41,060	1.32	0	–1
Democratic Change	12,165	0.39	0	0
PDC–PCN	4,913	0.16	0	–
Total	3,118,536	100.00	60	–24
Valid votes	3,118,536	96.46		
Invalid votes	74,146	2.29		
Blank votes	40,208	1.24		
Total votes	3,232,890	100.00		
Registered voters/turnout	6,214,399	52.02		
Source: TSE at the Wayback Machine (archived 3 March 2024)

==== Results by department ====
The following table displays the number of votes and seats each political party received from each of the country's 14 departments. The vote total for San Salvador includes votes cast from the exterior. The party with the most votes in a department is highlighted in its party color and the party with the second most votes and seats in a department is in gray.

Department	NI			ARENA			FMLN			GANA			PCN			PDC (Note: The PDC's vote total includes the votes for the coalition between the PDC and the PCN in the department of Morazán: 360 for the PDC, 125 for the PCN, and 4,913 for PDC–PCN.)			NT			V			CD			FS			Blank/invalid	Total
Department	V	%	S	V	%	S	V	%	S	V	%	S	V	%	S	V	%	S	V	%	S	V	%	S	V	%	S	V	%	S	V	V
Ahuachapán	102,131	61.70	2	12,276	7.42	0	6,713	4.06	0	997	0.60	0	34,824	21.04	1	—		0	916	0.55	0	—		0	—		0	7,676	4.64	0	7,080	173,087
Cabañas	40,038	63.50	2	5,106	8.10	0	4,446	7.05	0	9,688	15.37	0	2,186	3.47	0	—		0	—		0	—		0	1,585	2.51	0	—		0	2,980	66,029
Chalatenango	44,111	48.13	1	6,168	6.73	0	10,930	11.93	0	502	0.55	0	29,564	32.26	1	—		0	—		0	—		0	367	0.40	0	—		0	4,443	96,083
Cuscatlán	83,427	67.38	2	11,866	9.58	0	11,460	9.25	0	10,149	8.20	0	5,883	4.75	0	—		0	—		0	—		0	1,039	0.84	0	—		0	4,188	128,012
La Libertad	259,669	69.16	6	38,913	10.36	1	17,409	4.64	0	7,709	2.05	0	5,817	1.55	0	8,785	2.34	0	14,280	3.80	0	16,679	4.44	0	1,927	0.51	0	4,301	1.15	0	13,714	389,204
La Paz	99,653	67.54	3	20,088	13.62	0	8,067	5.47	0	5,067	3.43	0	925	0.63	0	1,433	0.97	0	745	0.50	0	2,143	1.45	0	886	0.60	0	8,537	5.79	0	5,409	152,952
La Unión	78,921	78.11	2	6,805	6.74	0	5,812	5.75	0	5,690	5.63	0	1,579	1.56	0	1,334	1.32	0	—		0	—		0	897	0.89	0	—		0	4,586	105,621
Morazán	50,737	63.43	2	4,977	6.22	0	12,930	16.17	0	5,481	6.85	0	—		0	5,397	6.75	0	—		0	—		0	464	0.58	0	—		0	3,583	83,569
San Miguel	113,455	59.71	4	6,674	3.51	0	15,385	8.10	0	7,072	3.72	0	3,521	1.85	0	40,308	21.21	1	—		0	—		0	771	0.41	0	2,813	1.48	0	9,661	199,659
San Salvador	828,219	76.70	14	63,044	5.84	1	50,309	4.66	0	23,229	2.15	0	7,070	0.65	0	11,398	1.06	0	21,579	2.00	0	67,235	6.23	1	—		0	7,684	0.71	0	29,773	1,109,540
San Vicente	47,132	65.77	2	6,638	9.26	0	8,623	12.03	0	4,961	6.92	0	1,023	1.43	0	810	1.13	0	—		0	—		0	553	0.77	0	1,920	2.68	0	2,948	74,607
Santa Ana	195,265	74.87	5	15,715	6.03	0	10,376	3.98	0	13,029	5.00	0	3,204	1.23	0	7,336	2.81	0	2,949	1.13	0	4,808	1.84	0	1,104	0.42	0	7,020	2.69	0	11,222	272,027
Sonsonate	156,282	69.57	5	22,048	9.82	0	12,874	5.73	0	3,076	1.37	0	5,041	2.24	0	19,611	8.73	0	—		0	—		0	1,530	0.68	0	4,176	1.86	0	9,166	233,804
Usulután	101,295	74.56	4	7,040	5.18	0	20,587	9.48	0	2,695	1.98	0	881	0.65	0	2,543	1.87	0	591	0.44	0	—		0	1,044	0.77	0	6,894	5.07	0	5,069	148,640
Total	2,200,332	70.56	54	227,357	7.29	2	195,920	6.28	0	99,344	3.19	0	101,641	3.26	2	98,021	3.15	1	41,060	1.32	0	91,675	2.94	1	12,165	0.39	0	51,021	1.64	0	114,354	3,232,890

=== Municipal results ===
Composition of the municipalities after the 2024 election (top) and its composition had the electoral reforms of June 2023 not occurred (bottom)

Nuevas Ideas, GANA, the PDC, the PCN, Solidary Force, and ARENA all won at least one mayorship, while the FMLN, Vamos, Nuestro Tiempo, Democratic Change, and the Salvadoran Patriotic Fraternity did not win any. Turnout for the municipal election was the lowest since the end of the Salvadoran Civil War in 1992. In total, the opposition won 1 mayorship, 1 trustee, 24 proprietary aldermen, and 23 substitute aldermen in 16 of the 44 municipal councils; this accounts for around 10 percent of all municipal council positions. Nuevas Ideas and its allies won the remaining 90 percent of municipal council positions.

According to La Prensa Gráfica, had the reduction of municipalities not occurred, Nuevas Ideas would have still won the most municipalities, but it would not have won more than half of the municipalities, instead winning only 122 compared to 152 in 2021. Additionally, the FMLN and Democratic Change, parties which failed to win any municipalities, would have won 21 and 1 municipalities, respectively.

A parliament diagram chart depicting the results of the 2024 Salvadoran municipal election totaling 44 seats
Party	Votes	%	Seats	+/–
Nuevas Ideas	592,084	36.63	26	–124
Grand Alliance for National Unity	216,664	13.41	6	–21
Christian Democratic Party	180,377	11.16	4	+3
Nationalist Republican Alliance	158,089	9.78	1	–34
National Coalition Party	120,267	7.44	3	–10
Farabundo Martí National Liberation Front	125,733	7.78	0	–30
Solidary Force	70,455	4.36	1	New
Democratic Change	52,356	3.24	0	0
NI–CD	24,169	1.50	2	–
PCN–PDC	22,446	1.39	1	–
NI–GANA	15,992	0.99	0	–
Nuestro Tiempo	15,202	0.94	0	0
Vamos	8,994	0.56	0	–1
Salvadoran Patriotic Fraternity	7,440	0.46	0	New
PCN–GANA	5,948	0.37	0	–
Total	1,616,216	100.00	44	–218
Valid votes	1,616,216	98.11		
Invalid votes	27,278	1.66		
Blank votes	3,865	0.23		
Total votes	1,647,359	100.00		
Registered voters/turnout	5,517,754	29.86		
Source: TSE

=== PARLACEN results ===
Turnout for the PARLACEN election was the lowest in 25 years and reached just 29.88%. La Prensa Gráfica attributed the low turnout and almost 10 percent of the vote being blank or invalid to PARLACEN's general unpopularity in El Salvador, with many invalid ballots containing messages questioning PARLACEN's functions or relevance.

A parliament diagram chart depicting the results of the 2024 Salvadoran PARLACEN election totaling 20 seats
Party	Votes	%	Seats	+/–
Nuevas Ideas	799,433	53.75	13	–1
Nationalist Republican Alliance	163,433	10.99	2	–1
Farabundo Martí National Liberation Front	122,926	8.26	2	+1
Grand Alliance for National Unity	116,549	7.84	2	+1
Christian Democratic Party	114,370	7.69	1	+1
National Coalition Party	91,474	6.15	0	–1
Solidary Force	48,856	3.28	0	New
Democratic Change	30,284	2.04	0	New
Total	1,487,325	100.00	20	0
Valid votes	1,487,325	90.22		
Invalid votes	86,824	5.27		
Blank votes	74,345	4.51		
Total votes	1,648,494	100.00		
Registered voters/turnout	5,517,754	29.88		
Source: TSE

== Aftermath ==
After the results of the legislative election were published, Lourdes Argueta, a member of the FMLN's political commission, stated that the party "did not need a seat to [...] defend the people's interests". Regarding Claudia Ortiz winning re-election to the Legislative Assembly with Vamos, Mauricio Funes stated that she "has fought the battle and I am sure that she will continue to fight". The Resistance and Popular Rebellion Bloc called for Salvadorans to "reject this electoral farce". When asked about Nuevas Ideas' 500,000-vote difference between the presidential and legislative elections, Castro stated that "there is no comparison" and that such comparisons were "apples to oranges" ("peras a manzanas") as Bukele was a "phenomenon at the global level". After GANA lost all its seats in the Legislative Assembly, Gallegos, who himself lost his seat, stated that he would continue to support Bukele regardless of his political situation.

After polling stations closed for the municipal and PARLACEN elections, Bukele posted on X that Nuevas Ideas and its allies had won 43 of the 44 municipalities, claiming that the only municipality the opposition won was La Libertad Este. He acknowledged that some of Nuevas Ideas' municipal candidates lost as voters were unsatisfied with their current tenures. Bukele's announcement came before any official announcement from the TSE. Milagro Navas, ARENA's sole elected mayor, celebrated her victory against Minister of Housing Michelle Sol and stated that she would cooperate with Bukele's government. After the FMLN failed to win any mayorships, the party leadership stated that the FMLN would undergo a "total reorganization", adding that "this is not the end, it is the closing of a chapter".

=== Accusations of irregularities ===
The TSE released the first preliminary results late on 4 February 2024, but stalled until the morning of 5 February, with its website crashing shortly before midnight local time. The TSE attributed the delay to "multiple actions that have hampered the development of the transmission activities of preliminary results" and shortages of paper to print out vote tallies. It advised electoral boards at polling stations to resort to contingency measures such as tallying votes by hand and taking photographs or scans of manual tallies before sending them to the TSE. Deputies from ARENA, the FMLN, Vamos, and Nuestro Tiempo criticized the TSE's counting delay. Nuestro Tiempo claimed that there were inconsistencies between preliminary vote totals published by the TSE in published statements and on its website.

ARENA, the FMLN, Vamos, and Nuestro Tiempo all called for the TSE to launch a recount. On 5 February 2024, the TSE stated that it would conduct a manually count the legislative ballots "vote by vote" at the José Adolfo Pineda National Gymnasium, and that the results would be finalized within 15 days. The recount for legislative ballots began on 11 February and ended on 18 February. A similar recount occurred for the concurrent presidential election. During the recount process, opposition politicians accused the TSE of manipulating the recount to benefit Nuevas Ideas by including unfolded ballots that were marked in black pen; according to the TSE's election procedures, only folded ballots filled out in black crayon were considered valid.

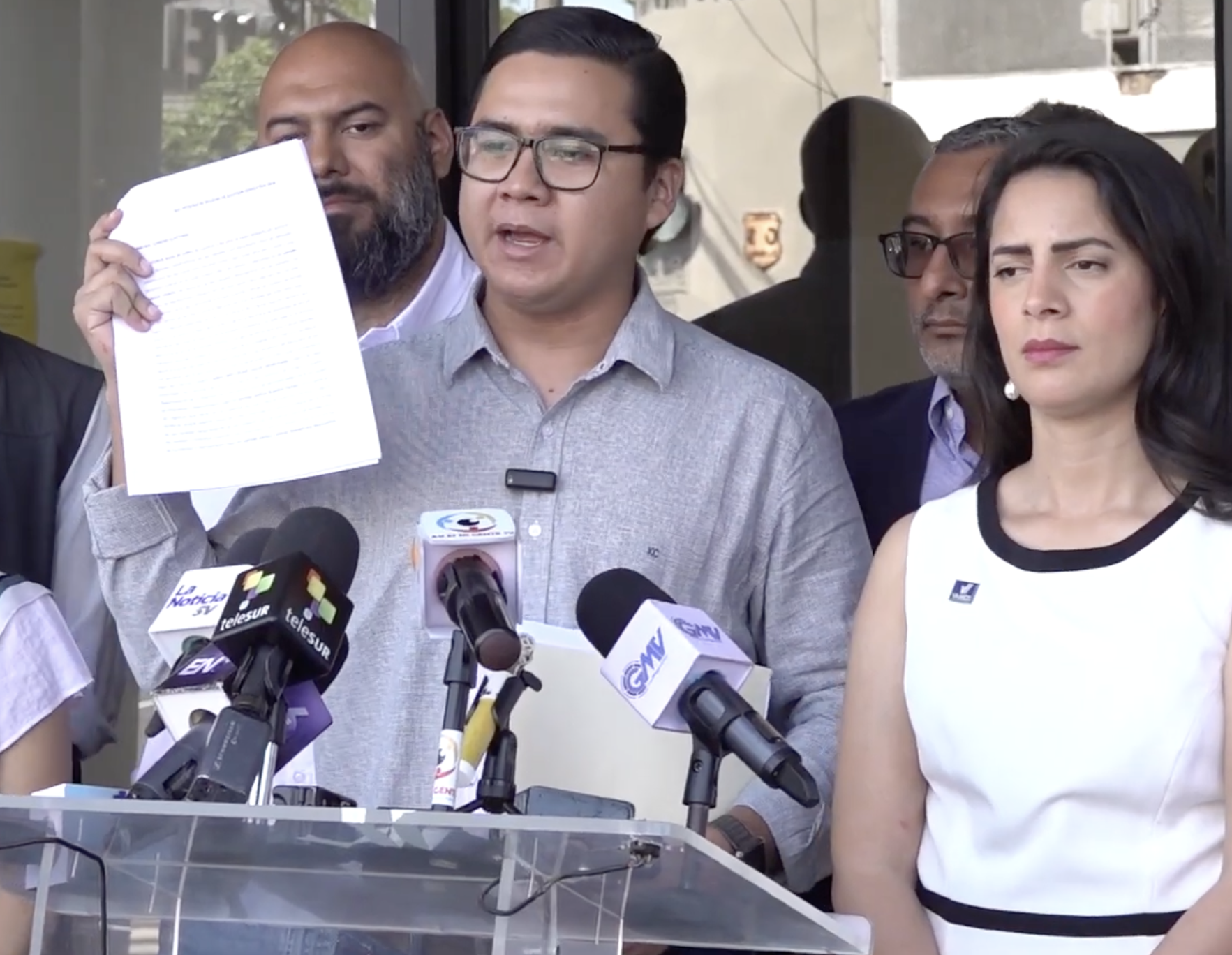
Opposition leaders with a proposal to nullify the results of the legislative election

On 6 February 2024, García Saade stated that ARENA would ask the TSE to nullify the Legislative Assembly election results as well as the concurrent presidential election results "not because of what has happened, but because of what will happen afterwards", while the FMLN and Nuestro Tiempo stated they would ask the TSE to nullify the legislative election results due to irregularities. On 10 February, ARENA stated that it would petition the TSE to postpone the municipal and PARLACEN elections by 15 days and to not use the same electoral system that was used during the presidential and legislative elections. On 13 February, the TSE announced that it would not postpone the municipal or PARLACEN elections. On 19 February, leaders from ARENA, Vamos, and Nuestro Tiempo jointly announced they had submitted a petition to the TSE to nullify the legislative elections due to irregularities and allegations of fraud. Later that day, the FMLN stated it would do the same. On 21 February, the TSE denied the joint petition, declaring it unfounded; the TSE did the same for the FMLN's petition the following day. In response to the TSE's declaration, Failer stated that the TSE was "ignoring the structural fraud that corrupted this election".

=== Legislative transition ===
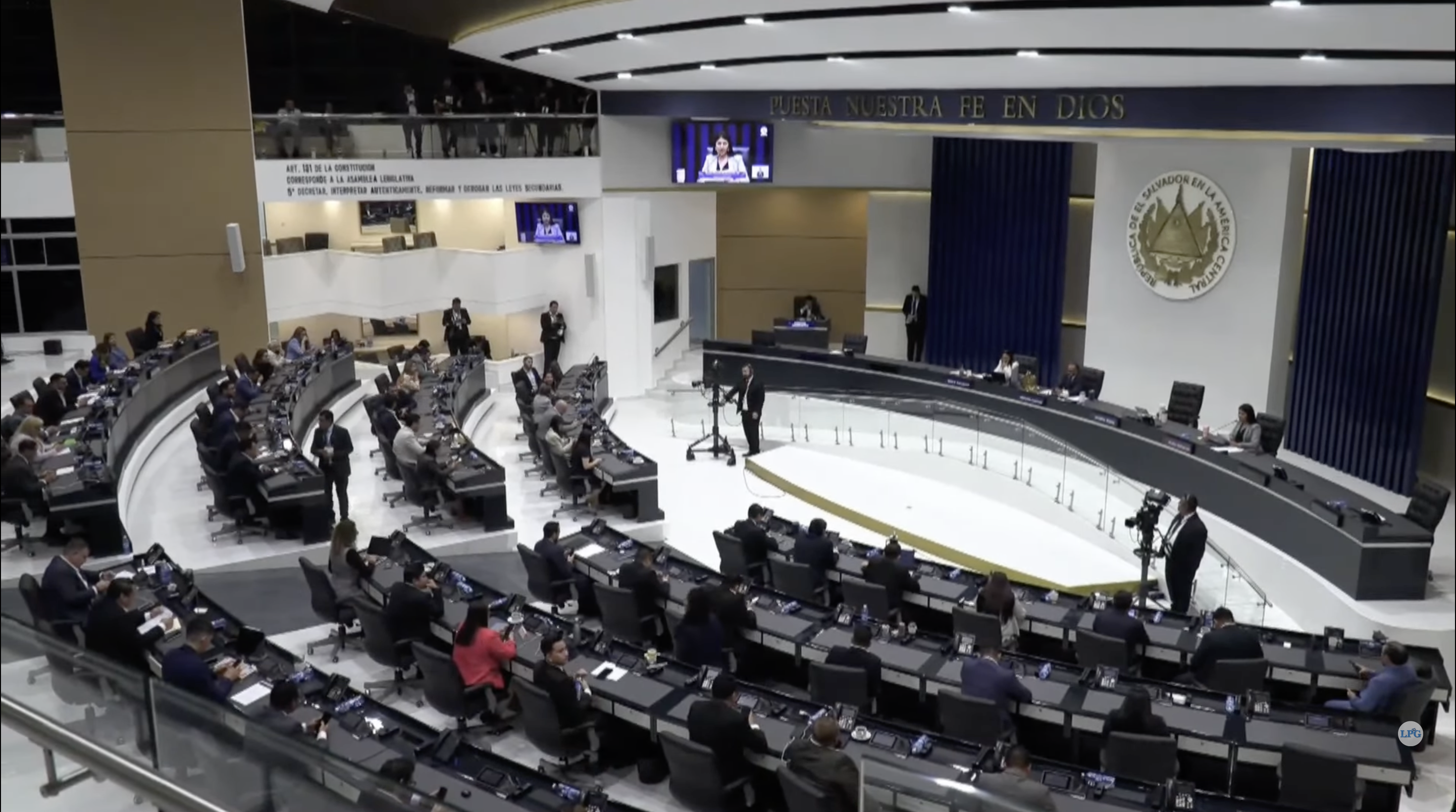
The 14th Legislative Assembly in session in 2025

The TSE ratified the results of the Legislative Assembly election on 18 March and the municipal and PARLACEN elections on 11 April. The TSE granted the elected deputies their legislative credentials on 20 March, the elected mayors and council members their municipal credentials in late April 2024, and the elected PARLACEN deputies on 25 April. The elected legislative deputies, mayors, and municipal council members assumed office on 1 May 2024. That same day, the reductions of legislative seats and municipalities went into effect. The 20 PARLACEN deputies are scheduled to assume office on 28 October 2026.

== See also ==
- Elections in El Salvador
- List of elections in 2024
  - 2024 national electoral calendar
  - 2024 local electoral calendar
