= Salvadoran Patriotic Fraternity =

Salvadoran political party

Salvadoran Patriotic Fraternity Fraternidad Patriota Salvadoreña
- Abbreviation: FPS
- Leader: Óscar Morales Lemus
- Founded: 12 July 1985
- Registered: 12 May 1998
- Political position: Right-wing
- Legislative Assembly: 0 / 60
- Municipalities: 0 / 44
- Central American Parliament: 0 / 20

Party flag

The Salvadoran Patriotic Fraternity (Spanish: Fraternidad Patriota Salvadoreña, abbreviated FPS) is a Salvadoran political party. Its leader is Óscar Morales Lemus.

== History ==
The Salvadoran Patriotic Fraternity was founded in 1985.

The party registered with the Supreme Electoral Court on 12 October 2022 to be able to run candidates during the 2024 presidential election. On 27 August 2023, Óscar Lemus, the party's leader announced that it had selected Marina Murillo, an architect, as its presidential candidate and Fausto Carranza as its vice presidential candidate.

== Electoral history ==
=== Presidential elections ===
Election	Candidate	First round			Second round			Result	Ref.
Election	Candidate	Votes	%	Pos.	Votes	%	Pos.	Result	Ref.
1989	Did not participate								
1994	Did not participate								
1999	Did not participate								
2004	Did not participate								
2009	Not registered								
2014	Óscar Lemus	6,659	0.25%	▲5th	–			Lost ✗	
2019	Did not participate								
2024	Mariana Murillo	19,293	0.60%	▼6th	–			Lost ✗	
2027	Orlando Delcid	To be determined			Second round abolished			TBD	

=== Legislative Assembly elections ===
Election	Votes	%	Position	Seats	+/–	Status in legislature
1985	Not registered					Extraparliamentary
1988	Did not participate					Extraparliamentary
1991	Did not participate					Extraparliamentary
1994	Did not participate					Extraparliamentary
1997	Did not participate					Extraparliamentary
2000	Did not participate					Extraparliamentary
2003	Did not participate					Extraparliamentary
2006	Not registered					Extraparliamentary
2009	Not registered					Extraparliamentary
2012	Did not participate					Extraparliamentary
2015	Did not participate					Extraparliamentary
2018	20,026	0.94%	▲9th	0 / 84	0	Extraparliamentary
2021	Did not participate					Extraparliamentary
2024	Did not participate					Extraparliamentary
2027	To be determined					

=== Municipal elections ===
Election	Votes	%	Position	Seats	+/–
1985	–	–	–	0 / 262	0
1988	–	–	–	0 / 262	0
1991	–	–	–	0 / 262	0
1994	–	–	–	0 / 262	0
1997	–	–	–	0 / 262	0
2000	–	–	–	0 / 262	0
2003	–	–	–	0 / 262	0
2006	–	–	–	0 / 262	0
2009	–	–	–	0 / 262	0
2012	1,366	0.06	–	0 / 262	0
2015	3,658	0.15	–	0 / 262	0
2018	12,565	0.55	▲6th	1 / 262	▲1
2021	Did not participate			0 / 262	▼1
2024	7,440	0.46	▼11th	0 / 44	0
2027	To be determined				
