= National Opposition Union (El Salvador) =

Salvadoran political coalition

National Opposition Union Unión Nacional Opositora
- Abbreviation: UNO
- Founded: 1972
- Dissolved: 1979
- Political position: Center-left

The National Opposition Union (Spanish: Unión Nacional Opositora, abbreviated as UNO) was a Salvadoran political coalition which existed from 1972 to 1979. The coalition was composed of the Christian Democratic Party, the National Revolutionary Movement, and the Nationalist Democratic Union.

== History ==
The coalition was formed to oppose the National Conciliation Party, the military controlled political party which controlled El Salvador. UNO ran in the presidential elections of 1972 and 1977. The elections were rigged however and despite sources claiming that UNO won both elections, official reports stated that the PCN won both elections.

== Electoral results ==
=== Presidential elections ===
Election	Candidate	Votes	%	Pos.	Result
1972	José Napoleón Duarte	324,756	42.14%	▲2nd	Lost ✗
1977	Ernesto Antonio Claramount Roseville	394,661	32.70%	2nd	Lost ✗

=== Legislative Assembly elections ===
Election	Votes	%	Position	Seats	+/–	Status in legislature
1972	119,194	22.71%	▲2nd	8 / 52	New	Opposition
1974			2nd	15 / 52	▲7	Opposition
1976			2nd	0 / 52	▼15	Extra-parliamentary
1978			▼3rd	0 / 52	0	Extra-parliamentary
