= Christian Democratic Party (El Salvador) =

Political party in El Salvador

Christian Democratic Party Partido Demócrata Cristiano
- Abbreviation: PDC
- Leader: Reinaldo Carballo
- Founded: 25 November 1960; 65 years ago
- Headquarters: Alameda Juan Pablo II & Once Ave Norte No. 507, San Salvador, El Salvador
- Ideology: Christian democracy Christian left
- Political position: Center to center-left
- Regional affiliation: Center-Democratic Integration Group
- International affiliation: Centrist Democrat International
- Colors: Green
- Seats in the Legislative Assembly: 1 / 60
- Municipalities: 4 / 44
- Seats in PARLACEN: 1 / 20

Website
- Archived website

The Christian Democratic Party (Spanish: Partido Demócrata Cristiano, abbreviated PDC) is a Salvadoran political party. From 2011 to 2012, the party was renamed to Party of Hope (Partido de la Esperanza, abbreviated PES) before reverting to the Christian Democratic Party. The PDC has been led by Reinaldo Carballo since 2023.

The PDC was founded in November 1960 in opposition of the Salvadoran military government, but in 1961, some members of the PDC left the party to form the National Conciliation Party (PCN) which would become the military's ruling party. Throughout the 1960s and 1970s, the PDC participated in various presidential and legislative elections which were marked by electoral fraud in the PCN's favor. In January 1980, following a coup d'état the year prior which overthrew the PCN's government, the PDC became involved in the ruling Revolutionary Government Junta. In December 1980, José Napoleón Duarte, a founding member of the PDC and former 1972 presidential candidate, was appointed as the president of the JRG. After leaving office in 1982, Duarte was elected president in 1984. The PDC failed to win the presidency in the succeeding 1989 presidential election, and as of 2026, Duarte remains the only president of El Salvador to have been a member of the PDC while in office.

Christian democracy has been the PDC's principle ideology since its establishment, but before and during the Salvadoran Civil War, the Salvadoran political right alleged that the party had communist sympathies. The party has been placed on the center to center-left of the political spectrum. The party's primary color is green and its logo is an ichthys.

== History ==
=== Military dictatorship ===
On 26 October 1960, the Armed Forces of El Salvador overthrew President Lieutenant Colonel José María Lemus and established the Junta of Government. The junta initiated reforms to allow opposition political parties to form, and as such, the Christian Democratic Party was formed on 25 November 1960 by middle and upper-class activists. The Junta of Government was overthrown on 25 January 1961 by the Civic-Military Directory. Although the directory affirmed its anti-communist position, it promised to hold elections.

The PDC held its first convention in May 1961, where it elected José Napoleón Duarte as its first leader. Duarte promoted reform and opposed working with the military government. Prior to Duarte's election, the Civic-Military Directory had approached the party to join the government in an effort to bring the directory political legitimacy, and some members showed interest in joining the government. After Duarte's election, the PDC members who wished the join the government left the party and formed the National Conciliation Party (PCN). The PCN succeeded the Revolutionary Party of Democratic Unification (PRUD) Salvadoran military's ruling party. In the 1961 legislative election, as the party of the military, the PCN won all 54 seats in the Legislative Assembly while the PDC was left outside of the legislature.

A new constitution was ratified in 1962, and it allowed for "contesting political parties" to exist. During the 1962 presidential election, the PCN ran unopposed and Lieutenant Colonel Julio Adalberto Rivera Carballo was elected as president of El Salvador. During the 1960s, the PDC established the Christian Federation of Salvadoran Peasants (FCCS). Many members of the FCCS would later go on to become members of the Farabundo Martí Popular Liberation Forces (FLP) during the 1970s. During the 1964 legislative election, the PDC won 14 of the legislature's 52 seats and 37 of the country's 262 municipalities. That same election, Duarte was elected as mayor of San Salvador, the country's capital city. Duarte won re-election during the 1966 election, while the PDC itself won 15 seats in the legislature.

The PDC nominated Abraham Rodríguez Portillo as its presidential candidate during the 1967 presidential election. Rodríguez Portillo opposed the PCN's Colonel Fidel Sánchez Hernández, who won the election with percent 54.37 of the vote. In the 1968 election, Duarte again won re-election and the PDC won 19 seats in the Legislative Assembly. The PDC supported the Salvadoran government during the 1969 Football War against Honduras. During the 1970 legislative election, the PDC lost three seats in the Legislative Assembly and lost 70 municipalities. The PDC, along with other opposition parties alleged that the PCN committed fraud.

In the 1972 election, the PDC joined the National Revolutionary Movement (MNR) and the Nationalist Democratic Union (UDN) to oppose the PCN in the 1972 presidential election. The three parties formed the National Opposition Union (UNO) and selected the PDC's Duarte as its presidential candidate and the MNR's Guillermo Ungo as its vice presidential candidate; the PCN presented Colonel Arturo Armando Molina as its presidential candidate. Prior to the election, the PDC's leaders accused the government of using the National Guard to harass, kidnap, and assault party activists. Additionally, the Central Electoral Council (CEC) canceled the campaigns of the PDC's legislative candidates in the departments of La Unión, San Miguel, San Salvador, San Vicente, Sonsonate, Usulután. On 20 February 1972, UNO claimed that Duarte had won the election with 327,000 votes to Molina's 318,000 votes; however, the government ordered a recount, in which the government determined that Molina had won by 10,000 votes. As a result, the Legislative Assembly voted to determine the election's winner, and as the legislature was controlled by the PCN, Molina was declared the winner. Duarte and Ungo appealed the election result to the CEC, but the appeal was denied. On 25 March 1972, some military officers led by Colonel Benjamín Mejía attempted a coup d'état against the PCN government with the intention of installing Duarte as president. Although the coup leaders captured the Presidential Palace and Sánchez Hernández, the coup eventually failed.

Following the failed coup, Duarte sought refuge in the Venezuelan embassy in San Salvador, but he was captured, beaten, and interrogated by the Salvadoran government. He was then deported to Guatemala where he then moved to exile in Venezuela. He returned to El Salvador to campaign for UNO ahead of the 1974 legislative election, however, UNO lost the election as a result of widespread fraud. UNO, including the PDC, boycotted the 1976 legislative election. For the 1977 presidential election, UNO did not select Duarte to be its presidential candidate as it believed the political situation was "too volatile", and instead, it selected retired Colonel Ernesto Claramount to be its candidate. As a result of widespread fraud, the PCN's candidate, General Carlos Humberto Romero, won the presidency. Claramount led a protest, consisting of thousands of people at the Liberty Plaza in San Salvador, against the election results, but government forces attacked the crowd, killing around 50 people. Claramount responded to the event by stating "This is not the end. It is only the beginning". Like in 1976, UNO and the PDC boycotted the 1978 legislative election.

=== Salvadoran Civil War ===
On 15 October 1979, some military officers overthrew Romero and the PCN government, establishing the Revolutionary Government Junta (JRG) consisting of both military officers and civilians. In January 1980, two members of the PDC, Héctor Dada Hirezi and José Antonio Morales Ehrlich, became members of the JRG. The military supported the involvement of the PDC in government as the military believed that the PDC would be able to assure government stability, bring political legitimacy to the JRG, and convince the United States to continue sending El Salvador military aid. On 3 March 1980, Dada Hirezi resigned from the JRG after Mario Zamora, the attorney general and a member of the PDC, was assassinated by members of a far-right death squad; Dada Hirezi was replaced by Duarte. Prior to his assassination on 24 March 1980 by a far-right death squad, Óscar Romero, the archbishop of San Salvador, called for the PDC to withdraw its involvement from the JRG due to the government's attacks against Salvadorans and clergy of the Catholic Church. On 13 December 1980, Duarte became the president of the JRG. In January 1981, during a rebel offensive of the Salvadoran Civil War, the left-wing Farabundo Martí National Liberation Front (FMLN) stated that it would assassinate Duarte.

A 1982 PDC election poster reading "People Duarte and P.D.C. From now on vote green".

In the 1982 legislative election, the PDC emerged as the largest party, winning 24 of the legislature's 60 seats, but it was excluded from the ruling government coalition led by the Nationalist Republican Alliance (ARENA), a far-right political party founded by Major Roberto D'Aubuisson (who was also elected as the president of the Legislative Assembly). D'Aubuisson was considered to be the most likely candidate to be elected by the Legislative Assembly to serve as president of El Salvador, but due to lobbying from the American and Salvadoran High Commands against D'Aubuisson due to his connection to far-right death squads, the Legislative Assembly ultimately voted to elect Álvaro Magaña of Democratic Action as the country's president. Magaña appointed ARENA, PDC, and PCN members to his cabinet. Between 1979 and early-1984, a total of 37 PDC mayors and other party members were assassinated by both far-right and far-left groups, although, Duarte himself claimed that "several hundred" had been assassinated.

During the 1984 presidential election, the PDC nominated Duarte as its presidential candidate. Including Duarte, eight candidates contested the election. In the first round on 25 March 1984, Duarte won 43.41 percent of the vote, the most of any candidate but not enough to negate a second round. In the second round, Duarte faced D'Aubuisson, as he came in second place with 29.77 percent of the vote. On 6 May 1984, Duarte won 53.59 percent of the vote, defeating D'Aubuisson by over 100,000 votes, and was elected president. Hugo Barrera, D'Aubuisson's running mate, stated that ARENA would not accept the results, claiming that the election "did not have any credibility" ("no tienen ninguna credibilidad"), that the results were a "farse" ("farsa"), and alleged that the United States' Central Intelligence Agency (CIA) had rigged the election. Reportedly, the CIA covertly sent US$ million to support Duarte's campaign.

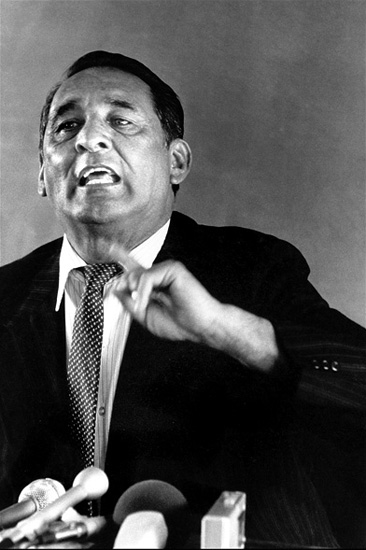
Duarte at a PDC press conference in 1982.

During Duarte's presidency, the Salvadoran government sought to negotiate a peace treaty with the FMLN to end the civil war. Negotiations were held in La Palma in October 1984, Ayagualo in November 1984, and San Salvador in October 1987. The government also met with the FMLN in Mexico City in August 1986, Panama City in January 1987, and Guatemala City and Caracas in October 1987. Despite the attempted peace negotiations, all of Duarte's government's efforts failed, and the civil war would not end until the signing of the Chapultepec Peace Accords in January 1992.

In the 1985 legislative election, the PDC won 33 of the Legislative Assembly's 60 seats, an outright majority. Additionally, the PDC won over 200 of the country's 262 municipalities. The PCN supported the PDC's legislative majority. By 1988, the PDC was one of El Salvador's three largest political parties, along with ARENA and the PCN. Although the PDC was at the peak of its power during the 1980s, Duarte's failure to bring an end to the civil war and PDC corruption scandals hurt the party's overall popularity. According to an opinion poll conducted by the Central American University in 1987, only 6 percent of voters identified with the PDC.

The PDC lost its legislative majority during the 1988 legislative election; the party won 23 seats, a loss of 10, and it also lost over 200 municipalities. Meanwhile, ARENA won 30 seats, exactly half of the seats in the legislature. ARENA initially protested the results of the election, arguing that it had actually won 31 seats. Regardless, the PCN opted to support ARENA's government, leaving the PDC in the opposition. Additionally, the Supreme Court of Justice eventually awarded the seat contested by ARENA to ARENA, reducing the PDC's seat count to 22. Some observers reported that, from 1984 to 1988, D'Aubuisson had been planning to stage a right-wing coup d'état against Duarte and the PDC, but that those plans were abandoned after ARENA's victory in the 1988 legislative election.

Ahead of the 1989 presidential election, the party was divided as to whether to nominate Fidel Chávez Mena, Magaña's minister of foreign affairs, or Julio Adolfo Rey Prendes, a longtime party member, as its presidential candidate. Duarte attempted to mediate and suggested to run Rodríguez Portillo as a compromise candidate, but his proposal was rejected by the party. The PDC ultimately selected Chávez Mena as its presidential candidate, while Rey Prendes split from the party to form the Authentic Democratic Christian Movement; both candidates lost in the first round to Alfredo Cristiani, ARENA's candidate, who won 53.82 percent of the vote. Voters preferred ARENA's proposal to use military action to end the civil war over the PDC's by-then failed peace negotiations.

=== Post-civil war politics ===
From the 1994 general election, the FMLN, which had since become a political party, surpassed the PDC to become the primary opposition political party to ARENA.

The PDC often sided with ARENA and supported their effort to ratify the Dominican Republic–Central America Free Trade Agreement and pass a law supposedly aimed at fighting terrorism.

The party struggled to pick a presidential candidate for 2009. The vice presidential candidate lived in the United States and has campaigned promising to give Salvadorans abroad the opportunity to vote in future presidential elections.

While the party was technically to be disbanded after the 2004 election, in which its candidate did not gather the necessary 3% of the vote, it was allowed to hold on to its registration by decree; this decree was declared unconstitutional on 30 April 2011, and the party was thus disbanded.

The PDC was effectively replaced by the Party of Hope, which was registered with the National Electoral Tribunal in October 2011. In September 2012 the Party of Hope asked for its name to be changed back to Christian Democratic Party, which was allowed by the Electoral Tribunal.

On 26 July 2018, the 2019 presidential election, the PDC joined the Alliance for a New Country (consisting of ARENA, the PCN, the PDC, and Salvadoran Democracy) to present a joint presidential and vice presidential candidacy. The alliance's presidential candidate was Carlos Calleja, a businessman from ARENA, and its vice presidential candidate was Carmen Aída Lazo, an economist from the PCN. On 3 February 2019, the alliance came in second place with 31.72 percent of the vote, however, Nayib Bukele of the Grand Alliance for National Unity (GANA) won an outright majority and was elected president, negating the need for a second round. Bukele was the first presidential candidate since Duarte to not be a member of ARENA or the FMLN.

In the 2021 legislative election, the PDC lost 2 seats in the Legislative Assembly, 4 municipalities, and its only seat in PARLACEN. Meanwhile, Nuevas Ideas, the political party established by Bukele in 2018, won a supermajority in the Legislative Assembly, half of the country's municipalities, and most of El Salvador's seats to PARLACEN. When the 13th session of the Legislative Assembly began on 1 May 2021, the PDC's sole member of the Legislative Assembly, Reinaldo Carballo, joined Nuevas Ideas' supermajority government. That same day, Carballo voted with Nuevas Ideas, the PCN, and GANA to elect Ernesto Castro as the president of the Legislative Assembly, remove five members of the Supreme Court of Justice's Constitutional Chamber, and remove Attorney General Raúl Melara.

Ahead of the 2024 presidential election, Carballo, who had become the party's leader, announced that the PDC would not select a presidential candidate. The party held its primary elections in July 2023, during which Carballo announced that the PDC would support Bukele's re-election campaign and reaffirmed that the party would not select a presidential candidate.

== Ideology ==
When the PDC was first established in 1960, its founders wanted to promise political stability and economic growth, but they believed that both the political right and left would threaten the party's ability to do so; the right opposed reform while the left sought to abandon capitalism in favor of communism. As such, the party's founders believed that presenting the party as centrist would gain it popular support and influence within the government. Since its establishment, the PDC's principle ideology has been Christian democracy, and the founders viewed Christian democratic movements in Chile and Venezuela as role models. In 1984, the CIA considered the PDC to be a centrist political party.

In October 1984, the United States embassy in San Salvador remarked that Duarte and the PDC "[symbolize] change in El Salvador towards liberal democracy, as conceived in the United States and Western Europe, more clearly" than anyone else and any other political party in El Salvador. The U.S. embassy also described the PDC as "slightly socialistic". Richard A. Haggerty, an editor for the Library of Congress, described the PDC as a "moderate" political party and as being "more liberal" than other Christian democratic parties in Latin America and Western Europe. He placed it on the center-left of the political spectrum. Retired U.S. Army Colonel Brian J. Bosch described the early-civil war PDC as "nonradical" and "mildly left-of-center".

During the 1960s and 1970s, the party used words such as "revolution" and "revolutionary" to describe its policies. These terms reminded the Salvadoran political right of Fidel Castro, and as such, the right viewed the PDC as "dangerously left-wing". During the civil war, ARENA alleged that the PDC had communist sympathies. D'Aubuisson himself pejoratively referred to the PDC as the "Watermelon Party", as the party's official color was green and they alleged that Duarte's support of left-wing groups during the 1970s implied continued communist ideologies ("green [...] outside, but red inside"). In turn, the PDC pejoratively referred to ARENA as the "Nazi-Fascist Party".

== Party structure ==
The Christian Democratic Party is led by a secretary-general, and as of, the party's sole member of the Legislative Assembly, Carballo, serves as the party's secretary general. The PDC also has a deputy secretary-general, a national syndicate, and an eight-member political commission.

The PDC's headquarters is located at Alameda Juan Pablo II and Once Avenue Norte Bis Número 507 in San Salvador, the country's capital city.

== Electoral history ==
=== Presidential elections ===
Election	Candidate	First round			Second round			Result	Ref.
Election	Candidate	Votes	%	Pos.	Votes	%	Pos.	Result	Ref.
1962	Did not participate								
1967	Abraham Rodríguez Portillo	106,358	21.62%	▲2nd	—N/a			Lost ✗	
1972	Supported José Napoleón Duarte (UNO)	324,756	42.14%	2nd	—N/a			Lost ✗	
1977	Supported Ernesto Claramount (UNO)	394,661	32.70%	2nd	—N/a			Lost ✗	
1982	Supported Álvaro Magaña (AD)	36 (Note: The 1982 presidential election was determined by the Legislative Assembly rather than through a popular vote.)	67.92%	▲1st	—N/a			Elected ✓	
1984	José Napoleón Duarte	549,727	43.41%	1st	752,625	53.59%	▲1st	Elected ✓	
1989	Fidel Chávez Mena	342,732	36.50%	▼2nd	—N/a			Lost ✗	
1994	Fidel Chávez Mena	214,277	16.27%	▼4th	—N/a			Lost ✗	
1999	Rodolfo Parker	67,207	5.68%	4th	—N/a			Lost ✗	
2004	Héctor Silva Argüello	88,737	3.90%	▲3rd	—N/a			Lost ✗	
2009	Withdrew								
2014	Supported Antonio Saca (UNIDAD)	307,603	11.44%	3rd	—N/a			Lost ✗	
2019	Supported Carlos Calleja (ARENA)	857,084	31.72%	▲2nd	—N/a			Lost ✗	
2024	Supported Nayib Bukele (NI)	2,701,725	84.65%	▲1st	—N/a			Elected ✓	
2027	Will not participate								

=== Legislative Assembly elections ===
View source data.

Election	Votes	%	Position	Seats	+/–	Status in legislature	Ref.
1961	64,916 (Note: The PDC participated in the 1961 legislative election as a part of the Union of Democratic Parties (UPD) coalition, along with the Renovating Action Party (PAR) and the Social Democratic Party (El Salvador) (PSD).)	18.78	▲2nd	0 / 54	New	Extraparliamentary	
1964	77,315	26.08	2nd	14 / 52	▲14	Opposition	
1966	120,645	31.16	2nd	15 / 52	▲1	Opposition	
1968	193,248	43.32	2nd	19 / 52	▲4	Opposition	
1970	142,659	27.01	2nd	16 / 52	▼3	Opposition	
1972	119,194 (Note: The PDC participated in the 1972 and 1974 legislative elections as a part of the National Opposing Union (UNO) coalition, along with the National Revolutionary Movement (MRN) and the Nationalist Democratic Union (UDN).)	22.71	2nd	8 / 52	▼9	Opposition	
1974	unknown		2nd	15 / 52	▲7	Opposition	
1976	boycotted		N/A	0 / 52	▼15	Extraparliamentary	
1978	boycotted		N/A	0 / 54	0	Extraparliamentary	
1982	590,644	40.20	▲1st	24 / 60	▲24	Opposition	
1985	505,338	52.35	1st	33 / 60	▲9	Government	
1988	326,716	35.10	▼2nd	22 / 60	▼11	Opposition	
1991	294,029	27.96	2nd	26 / 84	▲4	Opposition	
1994	240,451	17.87	▼3rd	18 / 84	▼8	Opposition	
1997	93,545	8.36	▼4th	10 / 84	▼8	Opposition	
2000	87,074	7.19	4th	6 / 84	▼4	Opposition	
2003	101,841	7.28	4th	5 / 84	▼1	Opposition	
2006	106,509	6.93	4th	6 / 84	▲1	Opposition	
2009	146,904	6.94	4th	5 / 84	▼1	Opposition	
2012	60,486	2.74	▼5th	1 / 84	▼4	Opposition	
2015	56,353	2.48	5th	1 / 84	0	Opposition	
2018	65,994	3.11	5th	3 / 84	▲3	Opposition	
2021	44,379	1.70	▼7th	1 / 84	▼2	In government	
2024	93,108	2.99	▲4th	1 / 60	0	In government	
2027	To be determined						

=== Municipal elections ===
Election	Votes	%	Position	Seats	+/–	Ref.
1961	Data unknown				New	
1964				37 / 262		
1966	Data unknown					
1968	Data unknown					
1970					▼70	
1972	Data unknown					
1974	Data unknown					
1976	boycotted		N/A	0 / 262		
1978	boycotted		N/A	0 / 262	0	
1982	Data unknown					
1985			▲1st	Over 200	▲200+	
1988					▼200+	
1991	Data unknown					
1994			2nd	29 / 262		
1997	101,945	9.11	▼4th	15 / 262	▼14	
2000	95,509	7.84	4th	18 / 262	▲3	
2003	104,494	7.45	4th	14 / 262	▼4	
2006	173,982	8.70	4th	14 / 262	0	
2009	185,824	8.36	4th	12 / 262	▼2	
2012	74,823	3.24	▼5th	5 / 262	▼7	
2015	52,729	2.23	5th	7 / 262	▲2	
2018	95,068	4.13	5th	5 / 262	▼2	
2021	44,379	1.70	▼7th	1 / 262	▼4	
2024	180,377	11.16	▲3rd	4 / 44	▲3	
2027	To be determined					

=== PARLACEN elections ===
Election	Votes	%	Position	Seats	+/–	Ref.
1994	240,451	17.87	▲3rd	4 / 20	New	
1997	Data unknown					
2000	87,074	7.19	4th	2 / 20		
2003	Data unknown					
2006	138,538	6.94	4th	1 / 20		
2009	153,654	6.92	▼5th	1 / 20	0	
2012	Data unknown					
2015	45,110	2.10	5th	1 / 20		
2018			5th	1 / 20	0	
2021	39,360	1.58	▼6th	0 / 20	▼1	
2024	114,370	7.69	▲5th	1 / 20	▲1	

== See also ==
- List of Christian democratic parties
- List of political parties in El Salvador
- Politics of El Salvador
