= 1972 Salvadoran presidential election =

- 20 February 1972 (popular vote); March 1972 (legislative vote)
- Registered: 1,119,699
- Turnout: 72.02%
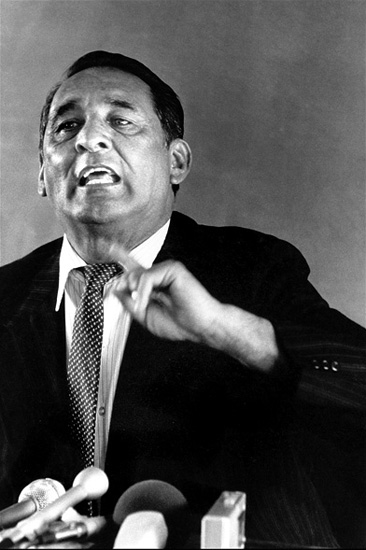
	PCN
Candidate	Arturo Armando Molina	José Napoleón Duarte
Party	PCN	UNO
Running mate	Enrique Mayorga Rivas	Guillermo Ungo
Popular vote	334,600	324,756
Percentage	43.42%	42.14%
Legislative vote	31	0
President before election
Fidel Sánchez Hernández
PCN
Elected President
Arturo Armando Molina
PCN

Presidential elections were held in El Salvador in 1972. A popular election was held on 20 February between four candidates, but since no candidate won an absolute majority, the Legislative Assembly of El Salvador elected the president indirectly in March. There was widespread fraud in the election's conduct.

On election day, the Central Electoral Council declared the National Opposition Union's (UNO) José Napoleón Duarte to have won the election, but the ruling National Conciliation Party (PCN) rigged the election in favor of its candidate, Colonel Arturo Armando Molina. The Legislative Assembly unanimously elected Molina as president after the opposition boycotted the vote.

== Background ==
Lieutenant Colonel José María Lemus, the president of El Salvador, was overthrown in a coup d'état in October 1960 by the social democratic Junta of Government. The junta was itself overthrown in January 1961 and replaced by the conservative Civic-Military Directory. The Civic-Military Directory approached members of the Christian Democratic Party (PDC) to participate in the new government. Founded in November 1960, the PDC advocated for Christian democracy while rejecting Marxism as politically extreme. The faction of the PDC that supported the Civic-Military Directory split from the party and formed the military-backed and conservative National Conciliation Party (PCN) in 1961.

The PCN went on to win every seat in the 1961 Constitutional Assembly election and Colonel Julio Adalberto Rivera, the leader of the Civic-Military Directory, went on to win the 1962 presidential election uncontested. Throughout the 1960s, José Napoleón Duarte-led PDC was the PCN's primary opponent and challenged the ruling party during the 1964 and 1966 legislative elections. In 1964, Duarte was elected as mayor of San Salvador. In the 1967 election, the PCN's General Fidel Sánchez Hernández defeated the PDC's Abraham Rodríguez Portillo and two other candidates by over 30 points.

== Candidates ==
The 1972 presidential election had four candidates. Sánchez selected Colonel Arturo Armando Molina to succeed him as the PCN's presidential candidate. Duarte was the presidential candidate for the National Opposition Union (UNO), a political coalition consisting of the PDC, the social democratic National Revolutionary Movement (MRN), and the leftist National Democratic Union (UDN). José Antonio Rodríguez Porth was the candidate for the conservative Salvadoran Popular Party (PPS), while Colonel José Alberto Medrano (the director of the National Guard from 1967 to 1970) was the candidate for the conservative United Democratic Independent Front (FUDI).

Party	Candidate	
National Opposition Union	José Napoleón Duarte	José Napoleón Duarte; Mayor of San Salvador (1964–1970)
United Democratic Independent Front	José Alberto Medrano	José Alberto Medrano; Director of the National Guard (1967–1970)
National Conciliation Party	Arturo Armando Molina	Arturo Armando Molina
Salvadoran Popular Party	José Antonio Rodríguez Porth	José Antonio Rodríguez Porth

== Election campaign ==
After the 1969 Football War against Honduras, the PDC began campaigning on land reform to rally popular support as the war worsened the country's land distribution crisis. The PDC accused the PCN of electoral fraud after the PDC lost 3 seats in the Legislative Assembly and over 70 municipalities during the 1970 legislative election.

Duarte resigned as mayor of San Salvador ahead of the 1972 presidential election to run as the UNO's presidential candidate. Duarte selected the MNR's Guillermo Ungo as his running mate. UNO supporters faced harassment, kidnappings, and assaults by the National Guard during the election campaign. The Central Electoral Council (CEC) also disqualified UNO's candidates for the 1972 legislative election, scheduled to occur one month after the presidential election, in six departments.

FUDI was supported by wealthy landowning families.

== Results ==
The election was held on 20 February 1972. There were 1,119,699 registered voters accounting for 30.5 percent of the population. Although the PCN attempted to stuff ballot boxes, the Central Electoral Council announced that Duarte had won the election. According to UNO election monitors, Duarte won with 327,000 votes to Molina's 318,000. A three-day media blackout ensued, after which, the CEC revised its results to give Molina 334,600 votes to Duarte's 324,756. As no candidate received an absolute majority according to the revised results, the Legislative Assembly was scheduled to elect the president. As PCN held a majority in the Legislative Assembly, it elected Molina as El Salvador's next president amidst a walkout by opposition deputies.

Political scientist Michael Krennerich described the election as having experienced "massive electoral fraud". and economist Edward S. Herman further described the fraud as having been "blatant". Richard A. Haggerty, a researcher for the United States Federal Research Division, remarked that "the actual vote count in the presidential balloting of February 20, 1972, probably will never be known".

Candidate	Party	Popular vote		Legislative vote	
Candidate	Party	Votes	%	Votes	%
Arturo Armando Molina	National Conciliation Party	334,600	43.42	31	100.00
José Napoleón Duarte	National Opposition Union	324,756	42.14		
José Antonio Rodríguez Porth	Salvadoran Popular Party	94,367	12.25		
José Alberto Medrano	United Democratic Independent Front	16,871	2.19		
Total		770,594	100.00	31	100.00
Valid votes		770,594	95.56		
Invalid votes		22,501	2.79		
Blank votes		13,262	1.64		
Total votes		806,357	100.00		
Registered voters/turnout		1,119,699	72.02	52	59.62
Source: Krennerich 2005, p. 288

== Aftermath ==
After the election, Duarte and Ungo called on the Central Electoral Council to launch a recount, but the CEC denied this request. The Farabundo Martí Popular Liberation Forces (FPL), a Marxist militant organization, applauded the PCN's electoral fraud as it believed that public frustration with the results would lead "the masses" ("las masas") to launch an armed conflict against the military dictatorship. The People's Revolutionary Army (ERP) was founded by young Salvadorans, including some UNO members, in the wake of the election and its fraudulent results.

On 25 March, disillusioned junior officers of the Armed Forces of El Salvador led by Colonel Benjamín Mejía launched a coup against Sánchez that aimed to install Duarte as president. Many Salvadorans marched in the streets in support of the coup, and according to Fabio Castillo Figueroa, a former member of the Junta of Government, the coup had the support of most junior officers as it "promised a healthy and bloodless democratic change". The coup leaders arrested Sánchez and established a "revolutionary junta", and Duarte issued a radio announcement calling on civilians to evacuate from areas that faced the threat of artillery fire. The coup failed when loyalist elements of the armed forces regained control of San Salvador and the militaries of Guatemala and Nicaragua launched a military intervention on the government's behalf. Around 200 civilians were killed during the coup attempt.

After the coup attempt, Duarte was tortured and exiled to Venezuela. Molina became president on 1 July and served until 1977 when he was succeeded by the PCN's General Carlos Humberto Romero who won the fraudulent 1977 presidential election. Romero was overthrown in 1979 marking the start of the Salvadoran Civil War.

== See also ==
- Elections in El Salvador
