= 2021 Salvadoran legislative election =

- 28 February 2021
- All 84 seats in the Legislative Assembly; 43 seats needed for a majority
- Turnout: 50.25% (▲4.52pp)
Party	Leader	Vote %	Seats	+/–
NI	Xavier Zablah Bukele	66.46	56	New
ARENA	Erick Salguero	12.18	14	−23
GANA	Nelson Guardado	5.29	5	−5
FMLN	Óscar Ortiz	6.91	4	−19
PCN	Manuel Rodríguez	4.08	2	−7
PDC	Rodolfo Parker	1.70	1	−2
NT	Juan Valiente	1.70	1	New
V	Josué Alvarado	1.01	1	New
This lists parties that won seats. See the complete results below.
Results by constituency
President of the Legislative Assembly before	President of the Legislative Assembly after
Mario Ponce; PCN	Ernesto Castro; NI

Legislative elections were held in El Salvador on 18 February 2021. Salvadorans elected all 84 deputies of the Legislative Assembly, all 262 mayors of municipal councils of the country's municipalities, and all 20 of El Salvador's deputies to the Central American Parliament (PARLACEN). (Note: Of the 120 seats in the Central American Parliament, El Salvador is allotted 20 seats. The remaining 100 seats are divided among the Dominican Republic, Guatemala, Honduras, Nicaragua, and Panama.)

Ten political parties were allowed by the Supreme Electoral Court (TSE) to participate in the election.

Opinion polling prior to the election indicated significant leads for Nuevas Ideas in the legislative and municipal elections. The election resulted in a landslide victory for Nuevas Ideas, which won a majority of the legislative seats, mayors and municipal councils and PARLACEN deputies. When the 13th session of the Legislative Assembly began on 1 May 2021, Nuevas Ideas formed a supermajority government with the Grand Alliance for National Unity, the National Coalition Party, and the Christian Democratic Party. The 2021 election was the last where Salvadorans elected 84 deputies of the Legislative Assembly and 262 mayors and municipal councils, as prior to the 2024 legislative election, the Legislative Assembly voted to approve two proposals made by Bukele which reduced the number of legislative seats to 60 and the number of municipalities to 44.

== Political background ==
=== Election of the XII Legislative Assembly ===
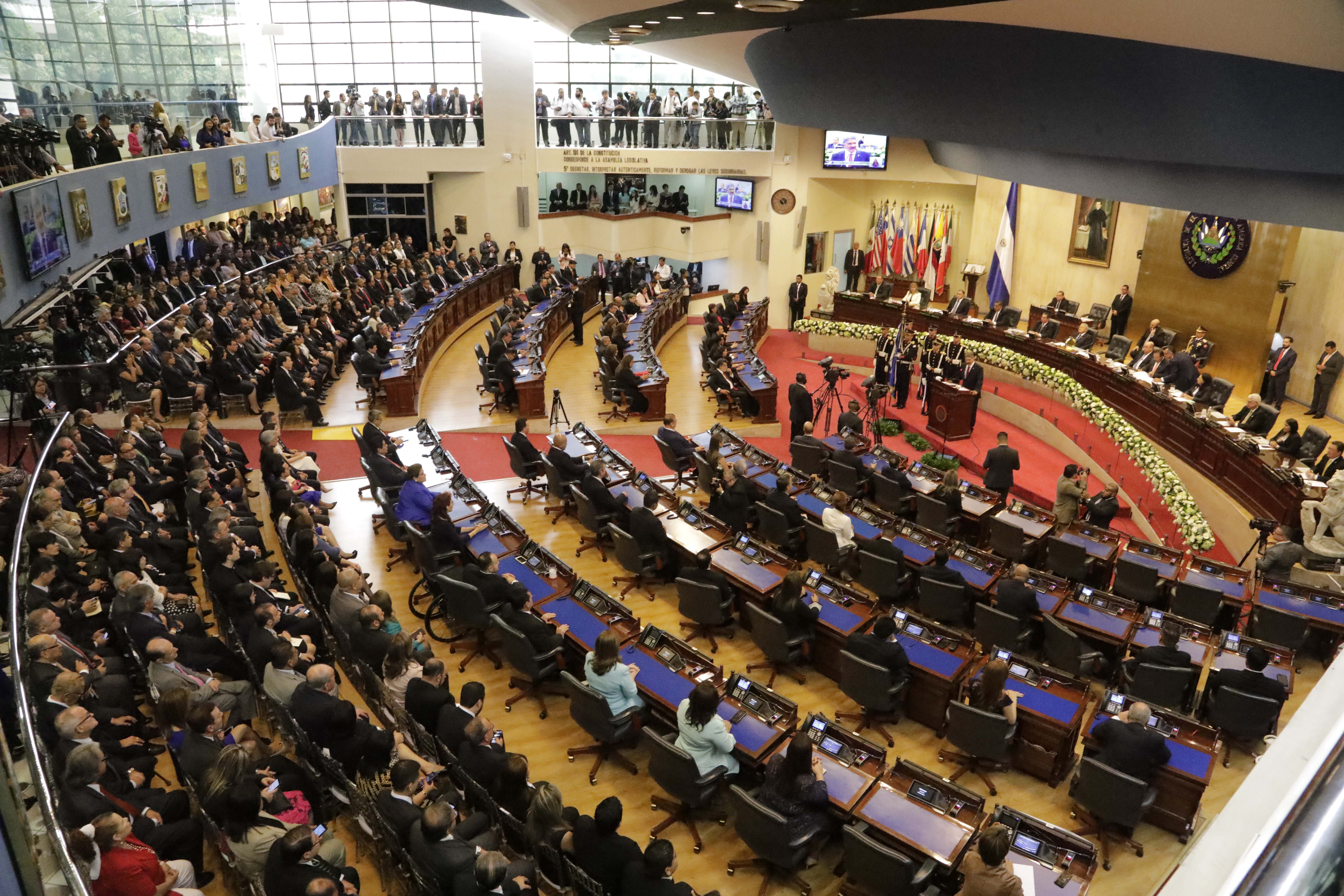
The XII Legislative Assembly in session in May 2018.

During the 2018 legislative election on 4 March 2018, the ruling Farabundo Martí National Liberation Front (FMLN) won 23 seats in the Legislative Assembly (a loss of 8 seats), the opposition Nationalist Republican Alliance (ARENA) won 37 seats (an increase of 2 seats), and the remaining 23 seats were divided by other political parties. The 12th session of the Legislative Assembly began on 1 May 2018. ARENA formed a coalition government with the National Coalition Party (PCN); the two parties agreed that ARENA deputy Norman Quijano would serve as the president of the Legislative Assembly from 1 May 2018 to 1 December 2019 and that PCN deputy Mario Ponce would serve from 1 December 2019 to 1 May 2021.

=== Presidency of Nayib Bukele ===
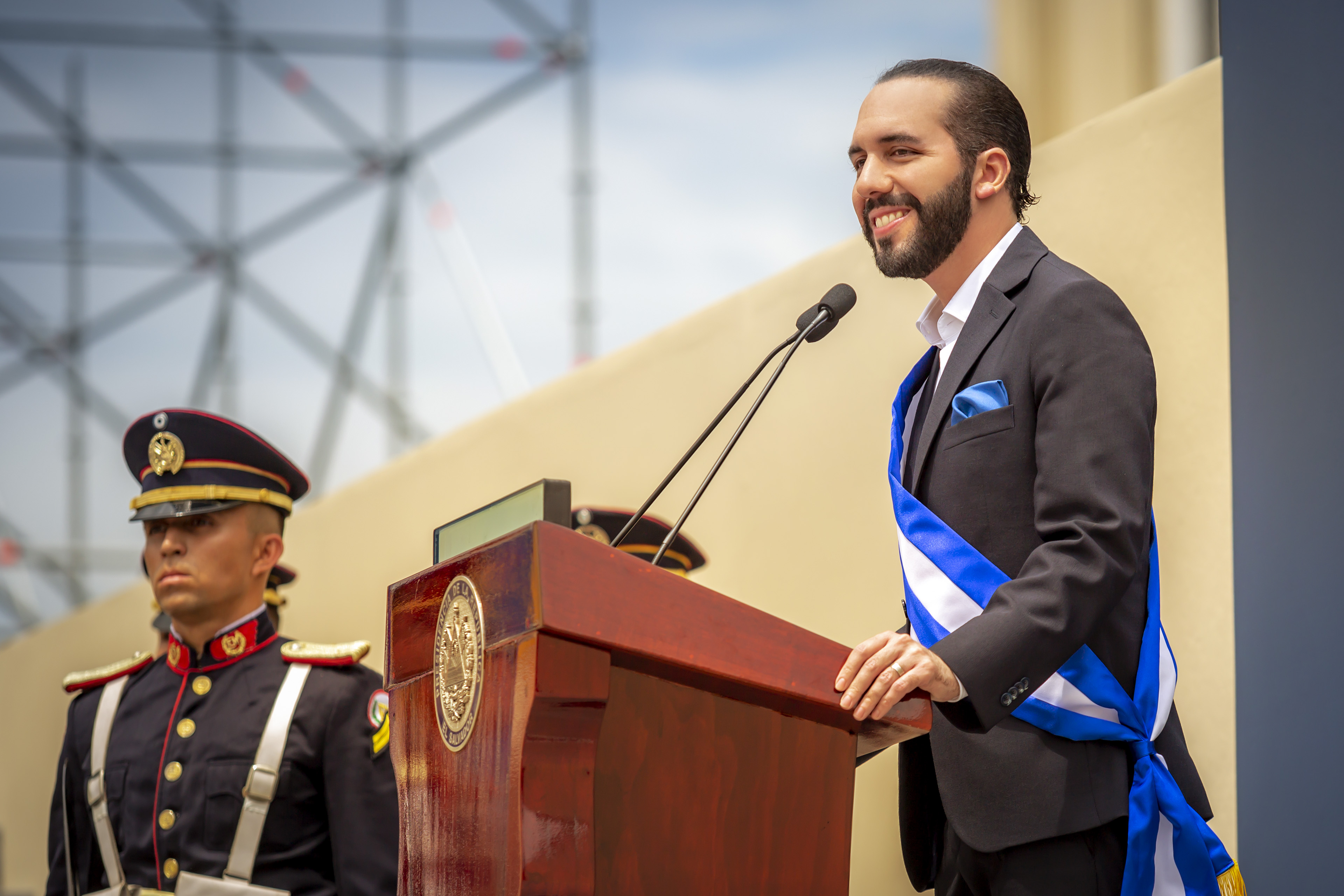
Nayib Bukele speaking on 1 June 2019, the day of his inauguration.

The 2019 presidential election was held on 3 February 2019. The presidential candidates were: Carlos Calleja of ARENA, Hugo Martínez of the FMLN, Josué Alvarado of Vamos, and Nayib Bukele of the Grand Alliance for National Unity (GANA). Although ARENA and the FMLN had held the presidency in a de facto two-party system since 1989, GANA's Bukele, who had previously been expelled from the FMLN in 2017 for verbally attacking a party official, led virtually every poll in the lead up to the election. In the election, Bukele won 53.10 percent of the vote, forgoing the need for a potential second round in March 2019. Bukele was inaugurated on 1 June 2019, becoming the first president to not be a member of either ARENA or the FMLN since José Napoleón Duarte of the Christian Democratic Party (PDC) left office in 1989.

As a part of his Territorial Control Plan, a government anti-crime and security plan, Bukele sought to receive a US$109 million dollar loan from the Central American Bank for Economic Integration to fund his plan. Bukele required the Legislative Assembly's approval, but ARENA and the FMLN, the legislature's two largest parties, both opposed the Territorial Control Plan. On 6 February 2020, Bukele invoked article 167 of the country's constitution which ordered members of the Legislative Assembly to convene an extraordinary session. On 9 February 2020, the date of the extraordinary session, Bukele ordered 40 armed soldiers to enter the Legislative Assembly, however, most deputies did not attend the extraordinary session. Various members of the Legislative Assembly denounced the event as an "attempted coup".

In March 2020, at the beginning of the COVID-19 pandemic, Bukele ordered a nationwide lockdown. The National Civil Police (PNC) arrested 4,236 people for violating the lockdown order, which Human Rights Watch denounced as leading to arbitrary arrests and police abuses. In April 2020, after a spike in homicides, Bukele ordered large-scale prison lockdowns and authorized the PNC to use lethal force against gang members. Although the country's homicide rate decreased from 36 homicides per 100,000 people in 2019 to 19.7 homicides per 100,000 people in 2020, both the El Faro digital newspaper and the United States Department of the Treasury alleged that Bukele's government had secretly negotiated with the Mara Salvatrucha (MS-13) and 18th Street (Barrio 18) criminal gangs to lower the country's homicide rate.

== Electoral system ==
=== Election procedure ===
Legislative elections were held in El Salvador two years after the 2019 presidential election and three years after the 2018 legislative election. The 84 deputies of the Legislative Assembly, 262 mayors and municipal councils of the country's municipalities (second-level subdivisions), and 20 deputies of the Central American Parliament were elected through a popular vote. The constitution of El Salvador mandated that the election would be "free, direct, equal and secret".

Deputies of the Legislative Assembly, mayors and municipal council members, and deputies of the Central American Parliament were elected by open-list proportional representation. The 84 deputies of the Legislative Assembly were elected in 14 constituencies for the country's 14 departments (first-level subdivisions), the 262 mayors and municipal councils were elected in one constituency each, and the 20 deputies of the Central American Parliament were elected from one nationwide constituency.

=== Political parties ===
Political parties had to be registered with the Supreme Electoral Court to be able to participate in the election. The following table shows the ten political parties which were eligible to participate in the 2021 election.

Party			Leader	2018 results		
Party			Leader	Legislative	Municipal	PARLACEN
Christian Democratic Party	PDC	Christian Democratic Party; Partido Demócrata Cristiano	Rodolfo Parker	3 / 84	5 / 262	1 / 20
Democratic Change	CD	Democratic Change; Cambio Democrático	Douglas Avilés	1 / 84	0 / 262	Did not run
Farabundo Martí National Liberation Front	FMLN	Farabundo Martí National Liberation Front; Frente Farabundo Martí para la Liberación Nacional	Óscar Ortiz	23 / 84	64 / 262	8 / 20
Grand Alliance for National Unity	GANA	Grand Alliance for National Unity; Gran Alianza por la Unidad Nacional	Nelson Guardado	10 / 84	26 / 262	2 / 20
Vamos	V	Let's Go; Vamos	Josué Alvarado	New party		
	PCN	National Coalition Party; Partido de Concertación Nacional	Manuel Rodríguez	9 / 84	25 / 262	1 / 20
Nationalist Republican Alliance	ARENA	Nationalist Republican Alliance; Alianza Republicana Nacionalista	Erick Salguero	37 / 84	140 / 262	8 / 20
Nuevas Ideas	NI	New Ideas; Nuevas Ideas	Xavier Zablah Bukele	New party		
Nuestro Tiempo	NT	Our Time; Nuestro Tiempo	Juan Valiente	New party		
Salvadoran Democracy	DS	Salvadoran Democracy; Democracia Salvadoreña	Adolfo Salume Artiñano	Did not run	0 / 262	Did not run

=== Registered voters ===
The following table lists the number of registered voters for the 2024 election in all fourteen departments, as well as the number of seats in the Legislative Assembly and number of municipalities assigned to each department. The figures, as published by the Supreme Electoral Court, were accurate as of 1 November 2020.

A labeled map of the fourteen departments of El Salvador.

Department	Voters	Seats in LA	Municipalities
Ahuachapán	287,729	4	12
Cabañas	142,508	3	9
Chalatenango	190,934	3	33
Cuscatlán	204,589	3	16
La Libertad	644,526	10	22
La Paz	274,522	4	22
La Unión	244,893	3	18
Morazán	165,498	3	26
San Miguel	424,882	6	20
San Salvador	1,456,688	24	19
San Vicente	149,310	3	13
Santa Ana	498,313	7	13
Sonsonate	392,286	6	16
Usulután	312,339	5	23
Expatriates (Note: Expatriates were unable to vote in the election. As such, the 431,445 expatriates were not included in the total figure of 5,389,017 registered voters.)	431,445	–	–
Total	5,389,017	84	262

== Retiring deputies ==
Twenty incumbent deputies of the Legislative Assembly did not run for re-election in 2021 due to them choosing to run for another office, being eliminated during their party's primary elections, or them choosing to not seek public office in 2021. Meanwhile, all five of the six retiring FMLN deputies were term limited by internal party statutes prohibiting deputies from seeking three consecutive terms on the Legislative Assembly.

Party	Retiring deputy	Department	Serving since	Ref.
Democratic Change	Juan José Martel	San Salvador	1 May 2018	
Farabundo Martí National Liberation Front	Audelia Guadalupe López Vásquez	Chalatenango	1 May 2012	
Farabundo Martí National Liberation Front	Juan Manuel de Jesús Flores Cornejo	La Libertad	1 May 2012	
Farabundo Martí National Liberation Front	Rodolfo Antonio Martínez	San Miguel	1 May 2012	
Farabundo Martí National Liberation Front	Karina Ivette Sosa de Rodas	San Salvador	1 May 2012	
Farabundo Martí National Liberation Front	Hortensia Margarita López Quintana	Santa Ana	1 May 2012	
Farabundo Martí National Liberation Front	Ana Lucía Baires de Martínez	Usulután	1 May 2015	
Grand Alliance for National Unity	Lorenzo Rivas Echeverría	Cabañas	1 May 2012	
Grand Alliance for National Unity	Francisco José Zablah Safie	La Libertad	1 May 2006	
Nationalist Republican Alliance	Arturo Simeón Magaña Azmitia	Ahuachapán	1 May 2018	
Nationalist Republican Alliance	René Gustavo Escalante Zelaya	La Libertad	1 May 2012	
Nationalist Republican Alliance	Mariano Dagoberto Blanco Rodríguez	Morazán	1 May 2018	
Nationalist Republican Alliance	José Edgar Escolán Batarsé	San Miguel	1 May 2012	
Nationalist Republican Alliance	Silvia Alejandrina Castro Figueroa	San Salvador	1 May 2012	
Nationalist Republican Alliance	Carmen Milena Mayorga Valera	San Salvador	1 May 2018	
Nationalist Republican Alliance	Norman Noel Quijano González	San Salvador	1 May 2018	
Nationalist Republican Alliance	David Ernesto Reyes Molina	San Salvador	1 May 2009	
Nationalist Republican Alliance	Patricia Elena Valdivieso de Gallardo	San Salvador	1 May 2015	
Nationalist Republican Alliance	Jorge Adalberto Josué Godoy Cardoza	Santa Ana	1 May 2018	
Independent	Felissa Guadalupe Cristales Miranda	La Libertad	1 May 2018	

== Electoral campaign ==
Political parties had until 29 July 2020 to hold their primary elections.

=== Nuevas Ideas ===
Through its social networks, the Nuevas Ideas political party denounced that the Electoral Board of the Supreme Electoral Court in Cabañas refused to register its candidates so that they could participate in the elections.

Nuevas Ideas formed political coalitions with GANA for some legislative elections; with GANA, the PCN, and Democratic Change in some municipal elections; and with Democratic Change in the PARLACEN election.

=== Nationalist Republican Alliance ===
ARENA formed political coalitions with Salvadoran Democracy and the PCN in some legislative elections and the PCN in some municipal elections.

=== Grand Alliance for National Unity ===
GANA formed political coalitions with Nuevas Ideas for some legislative elections and with Nuevas Ideas, the PCN, and Democratic Change in some municipal elections.

=== National Coalition Party ===
The PCN formed political coalitions with ARENA and Salvadoran Democracy in some legislative elections and with Nuevas Ideas, GANA, and ARENA in some municipal elections.

=== Other parties ===
Democratic Change formed political coalitions with ARENA and the PCN in all its legislative elections; with Nuevas Ideas and GANA in all its municipal elections; and with Nuevas Ideas in the PARLACEN election.

Salvadoran Democracy formed political coalitions with ARENA and the PCN in all its legislative elections. It did not participate in the municipal or PARLACEN elections.

Two independents—Leonardo Bonilla and Jesús Segovia—contested in the legislative elections in San Salvador and La Paz, respectively.

== Opinion polls ==
The following tables list the results of opinion polls for the 2021 legislative elections conducted between September 2019 and February 2021 in reverse chronological order. The party with the highest percentage is listed in bold and displayed with its background shaded, and the party with the second highest percentage is listed in bold. The lead column shows the percentage between the parties with the first and second highest percentages. In instances where the fieldwork date is unavailable, the publication date is used instead. When available, the projected seat count is listed below the percentage.

=== Legislative opinion polls ===
Local regression of polls conducted

Legislative election polls
Polling firm	Fieldwork date	Sample size	NI	ARENA	FMLN	GANA	PCN	PDC	CD	NT	V	Other	None	Unsure	Lead	Ref.
2021 election	28 February 2021	N/A	**66.46**; 56	**12.18**; 14	6.91; 4	5.29; 5	4.08; 2	1.70; 1	1.70; 1	1.01; 1	0.56; 0	–	–	–	54.28	
CIPSECA	8 February 2021	–	**68.0**	**7.0**	2.0	6.0	0.3	0.4	0.1	0.5	0.3	0.1	15.3		61	
CEC-UFG	13–17 Jan 2021	–	**64.7**	**7.1**	2.2	3.1	1.3	0.6	0.2	0.4	0.6	7.4	6.8	5.6	57.6	
UES	16 Dec 2020–15 Jan 2021	–	**43.5**	3.4	**15.5**	5.1	2.1	1.1	1.1	2.7	0.2	0.5	24.8		28.0	
CID-Gallup	16 December 2020	–	**48.0**; 41	4.3; 10	3.3; 2	**6.1**; 8	1.1; 1	0.9; 0	0.3; 0	0.2; 0	0.2; 0	0.9; 0	16.8	17.8	41.9	
CID-Gallup	16 December 2020	–	**70**; 60	6; 10	6; 2	**9**; 6	3; 0	1; 0	2; 0	–	–	6; 0	–		61	
Fundaungo	21 December 2020	–	**60.3**	**4.9**	2.7	4.5	–	–	–	–	–	27.6			55.4	
IUDOP	8 December 2020	–	**69.7**; 68	4.9; 6	**6.5**; 6	3.3; 2	2.2; 1	0.2; 1	0.1; 0	0.1; 0	0.2; 0	–	–	22.0	63.2	
CEC-UFG	14 September 2020	–	**48.0**	4.3	3.3	**6.1**	1.1	0.9	0.3	0.2	0.2	0.9	16.8	17.8	41.9	
TResearch	23–27 Jul 2020	1,000	**70.4**	**5.0**	4.4	3.1	–	–	–	1.7	0.8	2.3	4.8	7.5	65.4	
CID-Gallup	16 January 2020	–	**37**	**10**	3	–	–	–	–	–	–	50			27	
CEC-UFG	7–11 Jan 2020	1,292	**48.2**	**5.9**	2.6	3.6	0.3	0.4	–	0.1	0.2	–	7.5	31.3	42.3	
UCA	22 Nov–3 Dec 2019	1,265	**42.4**	**6.9**	5.2	3.7	–	–	–	–	–	2.8	14.8	24.3	35.5	
La Prensa Gráfica	20–25 Nov 2019	1,520	**34.2**	**6.0**	4.0	4.8	1.1	0.1	0.3	–	–	–	8.4	41.1	28.2	
CID-Gallup	19 September 2019	1,206	**35**	**8**	6	7	–	–	–	–	–	–	–	45	27	
2018 election	4 March 2018	N/A	–	**43.41**; 37	**26.78**; 23	11.45; 10	10.87; 9	4.21; 3	0.94; 1	–	–	2.35; 1	–	–	16.63	

=== Municipal opinion polls ===
Municipal election polls
Polling firm	Fieldwork date	Sample size	NI	ARENA	FMLN	GANA	PCN	PDC	CD	NT	V	Other	None	Unsure	Lead	Ref.
2021 election	28 February 2021	N/A	**50.78**; 152	**19.01**; 35	10.86; 30	11.16; 27	4.93; 14	1.73; 3	0.69; 0	0.45; 0	0.39; 1	–	–	–	31.77	
CEC-UFG	13–17 Jan 2021	–	**59.9**	**11.8**	5.3	5.3	1.8	0.8	0.4	0.3	0.7	–	8.0	5.7	48.1	
UES	16 Dec 2020–15 Jan 2021	–	**40.0**	5.8	**17.2**	6.2	2.1	1.0	1.4	2.2	0.3	0.7	23.1		22.8	
Fundaungo	21 December 2020	–	**50.3**	**10.6**	4.8	8.1	1.6	–	–	–	–	1.0	1.1	23.1	39.7	
IUDOP	8 December 2020	–	**44.0**	**10.0**	6.3	7.2	2.2	0.2	0.3	0.1	0.2	–	–	22.0	34.0	
CEC-UFG	7–11 Jan 2020	1,292	**48.2**	**5.9**	2.6	3.6	0.3	0.4	–	0.1	0.2	–	7.5	31.3	42.3	
La Prensa Gráfica	20–25 Nov 2019	1,520	**32.2**	**13.2**	6.3	5.3	2.0	0.7	0.1	–	0.1	–	6.1	34.1	19.0	
2018 election	4 March 2018	N/A	–	**41.80**; 140	**29.18**; 64	12.58; 26	10.50; 25	4.13; 5	0.50; 0	–	–	1.31; 2	–	–	12.62	

== Results ==
Party	Votes	%	Seats	+/–
Nuevas Ideas	1,430,578	54.67	46	New
Nuevas Ideas–GANA	311,723	11.91	10	–
Nationalist Republican Alliance	206,328	7.88	9	−26
Farabundo Martí National Liberation Front	180,808	6.91	4	−14
Grand Alliance for National Unity	135,223	5.17	5	−5
ARENA–DS	99,003	3.78	4	–
National Coalition Party	85,548	3.27	1	−8
Nuestro Tiempo	44,401	1.70	1	New
Christian Democratic Party	44,379	1.70	1	–3
Vamos	26,492	1.01	1	New
PCN–DS	21,211	0.81	1	–
Democratic Change	14,768	0.56	0	−1
ARENA–PCN	13,503	0.52	1	–1
Independents	2,783	0.11	0	−1
Total	2,616,748	100.00	84	0
Valid votes	2,616,748	96.64		
Invalid votes	49,986	1.85		
Blank votes	41,060	1.52		
Total votes	2,707,794	100.00		
Registered voters/turnout	5,389,017	50.25		
Source: Supreme Electoral Court

=== Municipal elections ===
Party	Votes	%	Seats	+/–
Nuevas Ideas	1,342,968	50.78	152	New
Nationalist Republican Alliance	502,784	19.01	35	–104
Grand Alliance for National Unity	295,091	11.16	27	–
Farabundo Martí National Liberation Front	287,321	10.86	30	–34
National Coalition Party	130,346	4.93	14	–11
Christian Democratic Party	45,705	1.73	3	–4
Vamos	10,413	0.39	1	New
Democratic Change	18,301	0.69	0	–
Nuestro Tiempo	11,974	0.45	0	New
Total	2,644,903	100.00	262	0
Valid votes	2,644,903	97.75		
Invalid votes	44,859	1.66		
Blank votes	16,151	0.60		
Total votes	2,705,913	100.00		
Registered voters/turnout	5,389,017	50.21		
Source: Supreme Electoral Court

=== PARLACEN ===
Party	Votes	%	Seats	+/–
Nuevas Ideas–Democratic Change	1,693,550	68.11	14	New
Nationalist Republican Alliance	329,039	13.23	3	–5
Farabundo Martí National Liberation Front	181,475	7.30	1	−7
Grand Alliance for National Unity	164,427	6.61	1	–1
National Coalition Party	78,492	3.16	1	0
Christian Democratic Party	39,360	1.58	0	–1
Total	2,486,343	100.00	20	0
Valid votes	2,486,343	91.79		
Invalid votes	84,449	3.12		
Blank votes	138,034	5.10		
Total votes	2,708,826	100.00		
Registered voters/turnout	5,389,017	50.27		
Source: Supreme Electoral Court

== See also ==
- Elections in El Salvador
- List of elections in 2021
  - 2021 national electoral calendar
  - 2021 local electoral calendar
