= 1988 Salvadoran legislative election =

← 1985	20 March 1988	1991 →
- All 60 seats in the Legislative Assembly; 31 seats needed for a majority
Party	Leader	Vote %	Seats	+/–
ARENA	Roberto D'Aubuisson	48.10	31	+18
PDC	José Duarte	35.10	22	−11
PCN		8.46	7	−5
This lists parties that won seats. See the complete results below.
Results by constituency

Legislative elections were held in El Salvador on 20 March 1988. The result was a victory for the Nationalist Republican Alliance, which won 31 of the 60 seats. Voter turnout was 59%.

== Results ==
Party	Votes	%	Seats	+/–
Nationalist Republican Alliance	447,696	48.10	31	+18
Christian Democratic Party	326,716	35.10	22	–11
National Conciliation Party	78,756	8.46	7	–5
Liberation Party	34,960	3.76	0	New
Salvadoran Authentic Institutional Party	19,609	2.11	0	–1
Democratic Action	16,211	1.74	0	–1
Renovating Action Party	5,059	0.54	0	0
Popular Orientation Party	1,742	0.19	0	0
Total	930,749	100.00	60	0
Valid votes	930,749	80.87		
Invalid/blank votes	220,185	19.13		
Total votes	1,150,934	100.00		
Registered voters/turnout	1,950,000	59.02		
Source: Nohlen

== Bibliography ==
- Political Handbook of the world, 1988. New York, 1989.
- Acevedo, Carlos. 1991. "Las novedades de las elecciones del 10 de marzo." Estudios centroamericanos (ECA) 46, 507-508:71-76 (enero-febrero 1991).
- Arriaza Meléndez, Jorge. 1989. Historia de los procesos electorales en El Salvador (1811–1989). San Salvador: Instituto Salvadoreño de Estudios Políticos.
- Benítez Manaut, Raúl. 1990. "El Salvador: un equilibrio imperfecto entre los votos y las botas." Secuencia 17:71-92 (mayo-agosto de 1990).
- Berryman, Phillip. 1988. Latin America and Caribbean Contemporary Record VII:B241-B258 (1987–1988).
- Blachman, Morris J. and Kenneth E. Sharpe. 1989. "Things fall apart in El Salvador: what's at stake in the presidential election." World policy journal 6, 1:107-140 (winter 1988-89).
- Córdova M., Ricardo. 1988. "Periodización del proceso de crisis (1979-1988)." El Salvador: guerra, política y paz (1979–1988). 1988. San Salvador: Graffiti. Pages 83–97 plus statistical tables.
- Eguizábal, Cristina. 1992. "Parties, programs, and politics in El Salvador." Goodman, Louis W., ed. 1992. Political parties and democracy in Central America. Boulder: Westview Press. Pages 135-160.
- Eguizábal, Cristina. 1992. "El Salvador: procesos electorales y democratización." Una tarea inconclusa: elecciones y democracia en America Latina: 1988-1991. 1992. San Jose: IIDH—CAPEL. Pages 41–65.
- García, José Z. 1989. "El Salvador: recent elections in historical perspective." Booth, John A. and Mitchell A. Seligson, eds. 1989. Elections and democracy in Central America. Chapel Hill: The University of North Carolina Press. Pages 60–92.
- Montes, Segundo. 1988. "Las elecciones del 20 de marzo de 1988." Estudios centroamericanos (ECA) 43, 473-474:175-190 (marzo-abril 1988).
- Montes, Segundo. 1989. "Las elecciones presidenciales del 20 de marzo de 1989." Estudios centroamericanos (ECA) 44, 485:199-210 (marzo 1989).
- Montgomery, Tommie Sue. 1995. Revolution in El Salvador: from civil strife to civil peace. Boulder: Westview.
- Ramos, Carlos Guillermo. "Los partidos políticos en las elecciones 1997." Ulloa, Felix et al. 1997. El Salvador: elecciones 1997. San Salvador: Fundación Dr. Guillermo Manuel Ungo.
- "Resultados oficiales de las elecciones." 1988. Estudios centroamericanos (ECA) 43, 473-474:285-295 (marzo-abril 1988).
