= 1974 Salvadoran legislative election =

- 10 March 1974
- All 52 seats in the Legislative Assembly; 27 seats needed for a majority
Party	Leader	Seats	+/–
PCN	Arturo Molina	36	−3
UNO		15	+7
United Independent Democratic Front		1	0
This lists parties that won seats. See the complete results below.

Legislative elections were held in El Salvador on 10 March 1974. The result was a victory for the National Conciliation Party, which won 36 of the 52 seats whilst the National Opposition Union (UNO) (an alliance of the Christian Democratic Party, the National Revolutionary Movement and the Nationalist Democratic Union) won only 15. However, the election was marred by massive fraud and the official vote counts were not published.

== Results ==
Party	Seats	+/–
National Conciliation Party	36	–3
National Opposition Union	15	+7
United Independent Democratic Front	1	0
Total	52	0
Source: Nohlen

== Bibliography ==
- Political Handbook of the world, 1974. New York, 1975.
- Anderson, Thomas P. 1988. Politics in Central America: Guatemala, El Salvador, Honduras, and Nicaragua. New York: Praeger. Revised edition.
- Herman, Edward S. and Frank Brodhead. 1984. Demonstration elections: U.S.-staged elections in the Dominican Republic, Vietnam, and El Salvador. Boston: South End Press.
- Montgomery, Tommie Sue. 1995. Revolution in El Salvador: from civil strife to civil peace. Boulder: Westview.
- Webre, Stephen. 1979. José Napoleón Duarte and the Christian Democratic Party in Salvadoran Politics 1960-1972. Baton Rouge: Louisiana State University Press.
