= 1989 Salvadoran presidential election =

1989 elections in El Salvador

← 1984	19 March 1989	1994 →
- Registered: 1,834,000
- Turnout: 54.70%
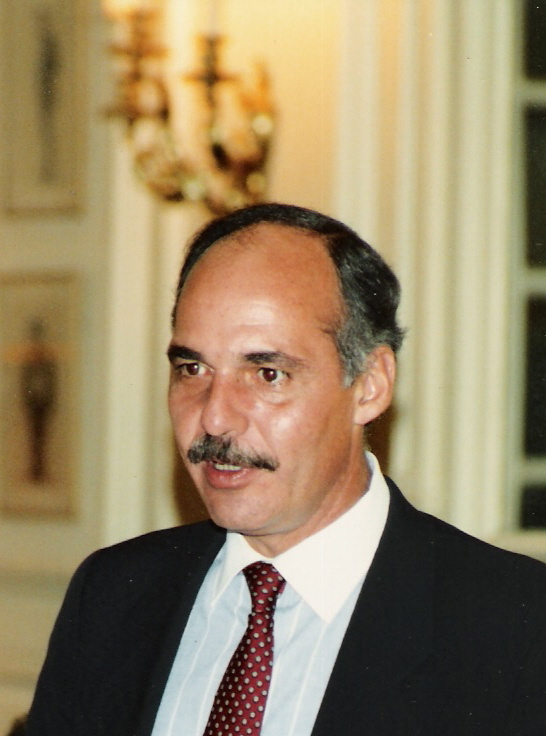
		PDC
Nominee	Alfredo Cristiani	Fidel Chávez Mena
Party	ARENA	PDC
Running mate	José Francisco Merino López	Francisco José Barrientos
Popular vote	505,370	342,732
Percentage	53.82%	36.50%
- Results by department
President before election
José Napoleón Duarte
PDC
Elected President
Alfredo Cristiani
ARENA

Presidential elections were held in El Salvador on 19 March 1989. The result was a victory for Alfredo Cristiani of the ARENA party, who secured a majority in the first round. The election marked the first time in Salvadoran history that power was transferred from one democratically elected president to another. Voter turnout was 54.7%.

== Results ==
Candidate	Party	Votes	%
Alfredo Cristiani	Nationalist Republican Alliance	505,370	53.82
Fidel Ángel Chávez Mena	Christian Democratic Party	342,732	36.50
Rafael Morán Castañeda	National Conciliation Party	38,218	4.07
Guillermo Ungo	Democratic Convergence	35,642	3.80
Julio Adolfo Rey Prendes	Authentic Democratic Christian Movement	9,300	0.99
Hugo César Barrera	Popular Union	4,609	0.49
Ricardo Molina	Renovating Action Party	3,207	0.34
Total		939,078	100.00
Valid votes		939,078	93.61
Invalid/blank votes		64,075	6.39
Total votes		1,003,153	100.00
Registered voters/turnout		1,834,000	54.70
Source: Nohlen
