= Grand Alliance for National Unity =

Political party in El Salvador

Grand Alliance for National Unity Gran Alianza por la Unidad Nacional
- Abbreviation: GANA
- President: Nelson Guardado
- Founder: José Andrés Rovira
- Founded: 16 January 2010; 16 years ago
- Registered: 19 May 2010; 16 years ago
- Split from: Nationalist Republican Alliance
- Headquarters: 41 Avenida Sur y Sexta-Décima Calle Poniente, San Salvador, El Salvador
- Ideology: Conservative liberalism Populism
- Political position: Center-right
- PARLACEN group: Center-Democratic Integration
- Colours: Orange (until 2018, from 2021); Turquoise (2018–2021)
- Seats in the Legislative Assembly: 0 / 60
- Mayors: 6 / 44
- Seats in the PARLACEN: 2 / 20

Party flag

Website
- gana.org.sv

The party's flag from 2018 to 2021.

The Grand Alliance for National Unity (GANA; Spanish: Gran Alianza por la Unidad Nacional) is a political party in El Salvador. The party established itself on 16 January 2010 and was recognized by the Supreme Electoral Court of El Salvador on 19 May of the same year.

The majority of party members came from the Nationalist Republican Alliance (ARENA). Originally the defection from ARENA included 12 deputies in the Legislative Assembly. There have been accusations of ARENA members being bought or blackmailed by the GANA party in order to secure them in their party. GANA has also been accused of multiple cases of corruption.

On 1 June 2019, Nayib Bukele under the banner of the GANA party became the first president of El Salvador since José Napoleón Duarte to come from outside of the two major political parties in El Salvador, the ARENA and FMLN. Bukele is also the first president to be elected while a part of GANA.

== Electoral history ==
=== Presidential elections ===
Election	Candidate	First round			Second round			Result
Election	Candidate	Votes	%	Pos.	Votes	%	Pos.	Result
2014	Supported Antonio Saca	307,603	11.44%	▲3rd	—N/a			Lost ✗
2019	Nayib Bukele	1,434,856	53.10%	▲1st	—N/a			Elected ✓
2024	Supported Nayib Bukele (NI)	2,701,725	84.65%	1st	—N/a			Elected ✓
2027	Will not participate							

=== Legislative Assembly elections ===
View source data.

Election	Votes	%	Position	Seats	+/–	Status in legislature
2012	210,101	9.6%	▲3rd	11 / 84	▲11	Coalition government
2015	209,897	9.22%	3rd	11 / 84	Steady	Coalition government
2018	243,268	11.45%	3rd	10 / 84	▼1	Opposition
2021	132,958	5.33%	▼4th	5 / 84	▼5	In government
2024	99,344	3.19	▼7th	0 / 60	▼5	Extraparliamentary
2027	To be determined					

=== Municipal elections ===
Election	Votes	%	Position	Municipalities	+/–	Ref.
2012	265,358	11.48	▲3rd	17 / 262	New	
2015	244,567	10.34	3rd	19 / 262	▲2	
2018	289,820	12.58	3rd	26 / 262	▲8	
2021	295,091	11.16	3rd	27 / 262	▲1	
2024	216,664	13.41	▲2nd	6 / 44	▼21	
2027	To be determined					

== See also ==
- List of political parties in El Salvador
- Politics of El Salvador
