= 2018 Salvadoran legislative election =

- 4 March 2018
- All 84 seats in the Legislative Assembly; 43 seats needed for a majority
- Turnout: 45.73% (▼2.50pp)
Party	Leader	Vote %	Seats	+/–
ARENA	Mauricio Interiano	41.72	35	0
FMLN	Medardo González	24.54	18	−13
GANA	Andrés Rovira	11.45	10	−1
PCN	Manuel Rodríguez	10.87	8	+2
PDC	Rodolfo Parker	3.11	2	+1
ARENA–PCN	–	1.69	3	0
FMLN–CD	–	1.15	3	+3
PDC–PCN	–	1.10	1	0
DC	Douglas Avilés	0.94	1	+1
FMLN–PSD–CD	–	0.59	1	+1
FMLN–PSD	–	0.50	1	+1
Independents	–	0.68	1	+1
This lists parties that won seats. See the complete results below.
Results by constituency
President of the Legislative Assembly before	President of the Legislative Assembly after
Guillermo Gallegos; GANA	Norman Quijano; ARENA

Legislative elections were held in El Salvador on 4 March 2018 to choose 84 members of the Legislative Assembly and 262 mayors. The elections were carried out by the Supreme Electoral Tribunal.

== Electoral system ==
The 84 members of the Legislative Assembly are elected by open list proportional representation from 14 multi-member constituencies based on the departments, with seats allocated using the largest remainder method.

== Legislative election ==
Party	Votes	%	Seats	+/–
Nationalist Republican Alliance	886,365	41.72	35	+3
Farabundo Martí National Liberation Front	521,257	24.54	18	–13
Grand Alliance for National Unity	243,268	11.45	10	–1
National Coalition Party	230,862	10.87	9	+3
Christian Democratic Party	65,994	3.11	2	+1
ARENA–PCN	35,826	1.69	2	–1
FMLN–CD	24,405	1.15	3	New
PDC–PCN	23,455	1.10	1	0
Salvadoran Patriotic Fraternity	20,026	0.94	0	0
Democratic Change	19,869	0.94	1	+1
Social Democratic Party	15,610	0.73	0	0
FMLN–CD–PSD	12,437	0.59	1	New
FMLN–PSD	10,609	0.50	1	New
Independents	14,546	0.68	1	+1
Total	2,124,529	100.00	84	0
Valid votes	2,124,529	89.59		
Invalid/blank votes	246,796	10.41		
Total votes	2,371,325	100.00		
Registered voters/turnout	5,186,042	45.73		
Source: TSE

=== By department ===
Department	ARENA		FMLN		GANA		PCN		PDC		FPS		CD		PSD		Ind	
Department	%	S	%	S	%	S	%	S	%	S	%	S	%	S	%	S	%	S
Ahuachapán	36.41	2	25.24	1	7.07	0	27.46	1	1.71	0	2.08	0	-	-	-	-	-	-
Cabañas	39.45	2	16.61	0	20.01	1	23.39	1	-	-	0.53	0	-	-	-	-	-	-
Chalatenango	29.96	1	25.91	1	12.29	0	30.19	1	0.77	0	0.18	0	0.52	0	0.15	0	-	-
Cuscatlán	37.89	1	27.57	1	2.93	0	30.38	1	-	-	0.81	0	-	-	0.66	0	-	-
La Libertad	53.71	5	25.57	3	10.09	1	6.20	1	2.35	-	0.98	0	-	-	1.05	0	-	-
La Paz	44.15	2	26.87	1	18.23	1	7.56	0	1.66	0	0.43	0	-	-	1.06	0	-	-
La Unión	47.35	2	26.09	1	12.11	0	7.58	0	6.26	0	-	-	-	-	0.58	0	-	-
Morazán	26.61	1	31.60	1	18.25	0	23.52	1	-	-	-	-	-	-	-	-	-	-
San Miguel	32.33	2	29.02	2	17.90	1	1.15	0	18.04	1	0.56	0	0.72	0	0.25	0	-	-
San Salvador	50.26	12	26.09	6	6.29	2	5.43	1	3.88	1	1.17	0	2.59	1	1.41	0	2.82	1
Santa Ana	38.08	3	19.10	1	13.57	1	16.46	1	9.99	1	1.98	0	0.79	0	0.18	0	-	-
San Vicente	48.62	1	29.54	1	17.95	0	36.56	1	-	-	0.61	0	-	-	0.52	0	-	-
Sonsonate	42.25	2	25.90	2	11.83	1	12.82	1	3.88	0	0.46	0	2.06	0	0.76	0	-	-
Usulután	39.41	2	38.44	2	15.28	1	5.14	0	-	-	1.15	0	-	-	0.56	0	-	-
Total	41.72	38	24.54	23	11.45	10	10.87	9	3.11	3	0.94	0	0.94	1	0.73	0	0.68	1
Source: TSE

== Municipal ==
Party	Votes	%	Seats	+/–
Nationalist Republican Alliance	962,807	41.80	140	+11
Farabundo Martí National Liberation Front	672,183	29.18	64	–21
Grand Alliance for National Unity	289,820	12.58	26	+8
National Coalition Party	241,850	10.50	25	+5
Christian Democratic Party	95,068	4.13	5	–2
Salvadoran Patriotic Fraternity	12,565	0.55	1	+1
Social Democratic Party	12,556	0.55	1	0
Democratic Change	11,539	0.50	0	–1
Salvadoran Progressive Party	3,607	0.16	0	0
Salvadoran Democracy	1,227	0.05	0	New
Total	2,303,222	100.00	262	0
Valid votes	2,303,222	95.22		
Invalid/blank votes	115,495	4.78		
Total votes	2,418,717	100.00		
Registered voters/turnout	5,186,042	46.64		

=== Departmental capitals ===
City	Current control	New control
Ahuachapán	National Coalition Party (PCN)	National Coalition Party (PCN)
Sensuntepeque	Nationalist Republican Alliance (ARENA)	Nationalist Republican Alliance (ARENA)
Chalatenango	Nationalist Republican Alliance (ARENA)	Nationalist Republican Alliance (ARENA)
Cojutepeque	Nationalist Republican Alliance (ARENA)	National Coalition Party (PCN)
Santa Tecla	Nationalist Republican Alliance (ARENA)	Nationalist Republican Alliance (ARENA)
Zacatecoluca	Farabundo Martí National Liberation Front (FMLN)	Farabundo Martí National Liberation Front (FMLN)
La Unión	Nationalist Republican Alliance (ARENA)	Nationalist Republican Alliance (ARENA)
San Francisco Gotera	Grand Alliance for National Unity (GANA)	Grand Alliance for National Unity (GANA)
San Miguel	Farabundo Martí National Liberation Front (FMLN)	Farabundo Martí National Liberation Front (FMLN)
San Salvador	Farabundo Martí National Liberation Front (FMLN)	Nationalist Republican Alliance (ARENA)
Santa Ana	Nationalist Republican Alliance (ARENA)	Nationalist Republican Alliance (ARENA)
San Vicente	Nationalist Republican Alliance (ARENA)	Nationalist Republican Alliance (ARENA)
Sonsonate	Nationalist Republican Alliance (ARENA)	Nationalist Republican Alliance (ARENA)
Usulután	National Coalition Party (PCN)	Nationalist Republican Alliance (ARENA)
