= 1968 Salvadoran legislative election =

- 10 March 1968
- All 52 seats in the Legislative Assembly; 27 seats needed for a majority
Party	Leader	Vote %	Seats	+/–
PCN	Fidel Sánchez	47.67	27	−4
PDC		43.32	19	+4
Popular		5.10	4	+3
MRN		3.91	2	New
This lists parties that won seats. See the complete results below.

Legislative elections were held in El Salvador on 10 March 1968. The result was a victory for the National Conciliation Party, which won 27 of the 52 seats. Voter turnout was just 36.6%.

== Results ==
Party	Votes	%	Seats	+/–
National Conciliation Party	212,661	47.67	27	–4
Christian Democratic Party	193,248	43.32	19	+4
Salvadoran Popular Party	22,748	5.10	4	+3
National Revolutionary Movement	17,449	3.91	2	New
Total	446,106	100.00	52	0
Valid votes	446,106	90.67		
Invalid/blank votes	45,931	9.33		
Total votes	492,037	100.00		
Registered voters/turnout	1,342,775	36.64		
Source: Nohlen

== Bibliography ==
- Political Handbook of the world, 1968. New York, 1969.
- Benítez Manaut, Raúl. 1990. "El Salvador: un equilibrio imperfecto entre los votos y las botas." Secuencia 17:71-92 (mayo-agosto de 1990).
- Caldera T., Hilda. 1983. Historia del Partido Demócrata Cristiano de El Salvador. Tegucigalpa: Instituto Centroamericano de Estudios Políticos.
- Danby, Colin. The electoral farce ends, the war continues: the United States and the Salvadoran elections. Cambridge: CAMINO (Central America Information Office).
- Eguizábal, Cristina. 1984. "El Salvador: elecciones sin democracia." Polemica (Costa Rica) 14/15:16-33 (marzo-junio 1984).
- Herman, Edward S. and Frank Brodhead. 1984. Demonstration elections: U.S.-staged elections in the Dominican Republic, Vietnam, and El Salvador. Boston: South End Press.
- Webre, Stephen. 1979. José Napoleón Duarte and the Christian Democratic Party in Salvadoran Politics 1960-1972. Baton Rouge: Louisiana State University Press.
- Williams, Philip J. and Knut Walter. 1997. Militarization and demilitarization in El Salvador's transition to democracy. Pittsburgh: University of Pittsburgh Press.
