= 1972 Salvadoran legislative election =

- 12 March 1972
- All 52 seats in the Legislative Assembly; 27 seats needed for a majority
Party	Leader	Vote %	Seats	+/–
PCN	Fidel Sánchez	67.39	39	+5
UNO	José Duarte	22.71	8	−8
Popular		6.06	4	+3
United Independent Democratic Front		3.85	1	New
This lists parties that won seats. See the complete results below.

Legislative elections were held in El Salvador on 12 March 1972. The result was a victory for the National Conciliation Party, which won 39 of the 52 seats. However, the election was marred by massive fraud and the Central Election Council disqualified the candidates of the opposition National Opposition Union (an alliance of the Christian Democratic Party, the National Revolutionary Movement and the Nationalist Democratic Union) in five out of fourteen constituencies. Voter turnout was 56.7%.

== Results ==
Party	Votes	%	Seats	+/–
National Conciliation Party	353,775	67.39	39	+5
National Opposition Union	119,194	22.71	8	–9
Salvadoran Popular Party	31,790	6.06	4	+3
United Independent Democratic Front	20,194	3.85	1	New
Total	524,953	100.00	52	0
Valid votes	524,953	82.72		
Invalid/blank votes	109,698	17.28		
Total votes	634,651	100.00		
Registered voters/turnout	1,119,699	56.68		
Source: Nohlen

== Bibliography ==
- Political Handbook of the world, 1972. New York, 1973.
- Caldera T., Hilda. 1983. Historia del Partido Demócrata Cristiano de El Salvador. Tegucigalpa: Instituto Centroamericano de Estudios Políticos.
- El Salvador. Presidencia. Departamento de Relaciones Públicas. 1972. Elecciones del 72: 20 de febrero, 12 de marzo. San Salvador: Departamento de Relaciones Públicas, Casa Presidencial.
- Montgomery, Tommie Sue. 1995. Revolution in El Salvador: from civil strife to civil peace. Boulder: Westview.
- Webre, Stephen. 1979. José Napoleón Duarte and the Christian Democratic Party in Salvadoran Politics 1960-1972. Baton Rouge: Louisiana State University Press.
- White, Alastair. 1973. El Salvador. New York: Praeger Publishers.
- Williams, Philip J. and Knut Walter. 1997. Militarization and demilitarization in El Salvador's transition to democracy. Pittsburgh: University of Pittsburgh Press.
