= 1991 Salvadoran legislative election =

- 10 March 1991
- All 84 seats in the Legislative Assembly; 43 seats needed for a majority
Party	Leader	Vote %	Seats	+/–
ARENA		44.33	39	+8
PDC		27.96	26	+4
CVD		12.16	8	New
PCN		8.99	9	+2
MCDA		3.23	1	New
UDN		2.68	1	+1
This lists parties that won seats. See the complete results below.
Results by constituency

Legislative elections were held in El Salvador on 10 March 1991. The result was a victory for the Nationalist Republican Alliance, which won 39 of the 84 seats. Voter turnout was 44.7%.

== Results ==
Party	Votes	%	Seats	+/–
Nationalist Republican Alliance	466,091	44.33	39	+8
Christian Democratic Party	294,029	27.96	26	+4
Democratic Convergence	127,855	12.16	8	New
National Conciliation Party	94,531	8.99	9	+2
Authentic Democratic Christian Movement	33,971	3.23	1	New
Nationalist Democratic Union	28,206	2.68	1	New
Democratic Action	6,798	0.65	0	0
Total	1,051,481	100.00	84	+24
Valid votes	1,051,481	91.19		
Invalid/blank votes	101,532	8.81		
Total votes	1,153,013	100.00		
Registered voters/turnout	2,582,000	44.66		
Source: Nohlen

== Bibliography ==
- Political Handbook of the world, 1991. New York, 1992.
- Acevedo, Carlos. 1991. "Las novedades de las elecciones del 10 de marzo." Estudios centroamericanos (ECA) 46, 507-508:71-76 (enero-febrero 1991).
- Córdova Macías, Ricardo and Andrew J. Stein. 1998. "National and local elections in El Salvador, 1982-1994." Dietz, Henry A. and Gil Shidlo, eds. 1998. Urban elections in democratic Latin America. Wilmington: SR Books. Pages 141-162.
- Eguizábal, Cristina. 1992. "Parties, programs, and politics in El Salvador." Goodman, Louis W., ed. 1992. Political parties and democracy in Central America. Boulder: Westview Press. Pages 135-160.
- Eguizábal, Cristina. 1992. "El Salvador: procesos electorales y democratización." Una tarea inconclusa: elecciones y democracia en America Latina: 1988-1991. 1992. San Jose: IIDH--CAPEL. Pages 41-65.
- "Las elecciones del 10 de marzo." 1991. Estudios centroamericanos (ECA) 46, 509:225-248 (marzo 1991).
- Lazo, José Francisco. 1993. Estrategia electoral 1994: la TRENZA. San Salvador: Centro de Investigación y Acción Social.
- Lungo Uclés, Mario. 1996. El Salvador in the eighties: counterinsurgency and revolution. Philadelphia: Temple University Press. (Based on his El Salvador en los 80: contrainsurgencia y revolución. 1990. San Jose: EDUCA--FLACSO.)
- Montgomery, Tommie Sue. 1995. Revolution in El Salvador: from civil strife to civil peace. Boulder: Westview.
- Stahler-Sholk, Richard. 1994. "El Salvador's negotiated transition: from low-intensity conflict to low-intensity democracy." Journal of interamerican studies and world affairs 36, 4:1-60 (winter 1994).
- Vickers, George R. 1992. "The political reality after eleven years of war." Tulchin, Joseph S. with Gary Bland, eds. 1992. Is there a transition to democracy in El Salvador? Boulder: Westview Press (Woodrow Wilson Center current studies on Latin America) Pages 25-58.
- Zamora, Rubén. 1997. "Democratic transition or modernization? The case of El Salvador since 1979." Dominguez, Jorge I. and Marc Lindenberg, eds. 1997. Democratic transitions in Central America. Gainesville: University Press of Florida. Pages 165-179.
