= 1984 Salvadoran presidential election =

- 25 March 1984 (first round); 6 May 1984 (second round)
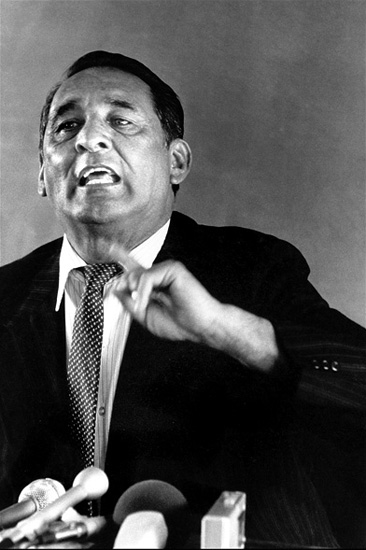
		ARENA
Nominee	José Napoleón Duarte	Roberto D'Aubuisson
Party	PDC	ARENA
Running mate	Rodolfo Antonio Castillo Claramount	Hugo César Barrera
Popular vote	752,625	651,741
Percentage	53.59%	46.41%
President before election
Álvaro Magaña
Democratic Action
Elected President
José Napoleón Duarte
PDC

Presidential elections were held in El Salvador on 25 March 1984, with a second round on 6 May. A new president was elected, together with a vice president, for a five-year term. The result was a victory for José Napoleón Duarte of the Christian Democratic Party.

The elections were held under military rule amidst high levels of repression and violence, and candidates to the left of Duarte's brand of Christian Democrats were excluded from participating.

Nevertheless, the election was considered the first fair and just in El Salvador after the 1931 election.

== Results ==
Candidate	Party	First round		Second round	
Candidate	Party	Votes	%	Votes	%
José Napoleón Duarte	Christian Democratic Party	549,727	43.41	752,625	53.59
Roberto D'Aubuisson	Nationalist Republican Alliance	376,917	29.77	651,741	46.41
Francisco José Guerrero	National Conciliation Party	244,556	19.31		
René Fortin Magaña	Democratic Action Party	43,939	3.47		
Francisco Quiñones Ávila	Salvadoran Popular Party	24,395	1.93		
Roberto García Escobar	Salvadoran Authentic Institutional Party	15,430	1.22		
Juan Ramón Rosales	Centrist Republican Stable Movement	6,645	0.52		
Gilberto Trujillo	Popular Orientation Party	4,677	0.37		
Total		1,266,286	100.00	1,404,366	100.00
Valid votes		1,266,286	89.21	1,404,366	92.15
Invalid/blank votes		153,217	10.79	119,713	7.85
Total votes		1,419,503	100.00	1,524,079	100.00
Source: Nohlen
