= Social Democratic Party (El Salvador) =

The Social Democratic Party (Spanish: Partido Social Demócrata) was a social-democratic party in El Salvador.

A Social Democratic Party participated in the 1945 presidential elections, with its candidate, Osmín Aguirre y Salinas, finishing second (albeit with only 0.2% of the vote). It also participated in the 1961 Constitutional Assembly elections as part of the Union of Democratic Parties (an alliance with the Renovating Action Party and Christian Democratic Party) but failed to win a seat.

The party reappeared in 2000, when it formed an alliance, the United Democratic Centre, with the Democratic Convergence party for the elections that year, winning three seats. However, the party ran alone in the 2003 elections, but failed to win a seat.
