= 1997 Salvadoran legislative election =

← 1994	16 March 1997	2000 →
- All 84 seats in the Legislative Assembly; 43 seats needed for a majority
Party	Leader	Vote %	Seats	+/–
ARENA		35.40	28	−11
FMLN		33.02	27	+6
PCN		8.70	11	+7
PDC		8.36	10	−8
PRCS		3.58	3	New
CVD		3.50	2	+1
PDL		3.15	2	New
MU		2.25	1	0
This lists parties that won seats. See the complete results below.
Results by constituency

Legislative elections were held in El Salvador on 16 March 1997. The result was a narrow victory for the Nationalist Republican Alliance, which won 28 of the 84 seats. Voter turnout was 39.2%.

== Results ==
Party	Votes	%	Seats	+/–
Nationalist Republican Alliance	396,301	35.40	28	–11
Farabundo Martí National Liberation Front	369,709	33.02	27	+6
National Conciliation Party	97,362	8.70	11	+7
Christian Democratic Party	93,545	8.36	10	–8
Social Christian Renewal Party	40,039	3.58	3	New
Democratic Convergence	39,145	3.50	2	+1
Liberal Democratic Party	35,279	3.15	2	New
Movement of Unity	25,244	2.25	1	0
Democratic Party	13,533	1.21	0	New
Movement of National Solidarity	7,012	0.63	0	0
Liberal Party	2,302	0.21	0	New
Salvadoran Authentic Movement	132	0.01	0	New
Total	1,119,603	100.00	84	0
Valid votes	1,119,603	95.13		
Invalid/blank votes	57,284	4.87		
Total votes	1,176,887	100.00		
Registered voters/turnout	3,004,174	39.18		
Source: Nohlen

== Bibliography ==
- Political Handbook of the world, 1997. New York, 1998.
- Córdova Macías, Ricardo and Andrew J. Stein. 1998. "National and local elections in El Salvador, 1982-1994." Dietz, Henry A. and Gil Shidlo, eds. 1998. Urban elections in democratic Latin America. Wilmington: SR Books. Pages 141-162.
- Cruz, José Miguel. 1997. "Tres reflexiones sobre el pasado proceso electoral." Estudios centroamericanos (ECA) 52, 583:442-447 (mayo 1997).
- Holiday, David. 1997. "Salvador's guerrilla vote." Nation 264, 14:6 (April 14, 1997).
- "Nuevas posibilidades para la transición política." 1997. Estudios centroamericanos (ECA) 52, 581-582 (marzo-abril 1997).
- "Resultados electorales." 1997. Estudios centroamericanos (ECA) 52, 581-582:339-358 (marzo-abril 1997).
