= Nelson Guardado =

Salvadoran politician

Deputy of the Central American Parliament from El Salvador
- Incumbent
- Assumed office 28 October 2021

President of the Grand Alliance for National Unity
- Incumbent
- Assumed office 11 November 2019
- Preceded by: José Andrés Rovira

Deputy of the Legislative Assembly of El Salvador from Chalatenango
- In office 1 May 2009 – 1 May 2012

Personal details
- Born: José Nelson Guardado Menjívar
- Party: Grand Alliance for National Unity (since 2010)
- Other political affiliations: Independent (2009–2010); Nationalist Republican Alliance (until 2009)
- Occupation: Politician

José Nelson Guardado Menjívar is a Salvadoran politician who has been the president of the Grand Alliance for National Unity (GANA) political party since 2019 and a deputy of the Central American Parliament (PARLACEN) since 2021. He previously served as a deputy of the Legislative Assembly of El Salvador from 2009 to 2012.

== Political career ==
Guardado was elected to the Legislative Assembly of El Salvador from Chalatenango as a member of the Nationalist Republican Alliance (ARENA) during the 2009 legislative election. Later that year, he was one of 12 ARENA deputies who left the party over disagreements with its leadership. In January 2010, Guardado was a founding member of the Grand Alliance for National Unity (GANA). Guardado was not re-elected in 2012.

On 11 June 2019, President Nayib Bukele appointed Guardado as the vice minister of public works. Guardado became the president of GANA on 11 November 2019.

On 28 October 2021, Guardado was sworn in as a deputy of the Central American Parliament (PARLACEN) representing El Salvador.

Party political offices
| Preceded by José Andrés Rovira | President of the Grand Alliance for National Unity; 2019–present | Incumbent |
