= 1985 Salvadoran legislative election =

- 31 March 1985
- All 60 seats in the Legislative Assembly; 31 seats needed for a majority
Party	Leader	Vote %	Seats	+/–
PDC	José Duarte	52.35	33	+9
ARENA	Roberto D'Aubuisson	29.70	13	−6
PCN		8.36	12	−2
PIAS		3.74	1	New
AD		3.68	1	−1
This lists parties that won seats. See the complete results below.
Results by constituency

Legislative elections were held in El Salvador on 31 March 1985. The result was a victory for the Christian Democratic Party, which won 33 of the 60 seats. Voter turnout was 42%.

== Results ==
Party	Votes	%	Seats	+/–
Christian Democratic Party	505,338	52.35	33	+9
Nationalist Republican Alliance	286,665	29.70	13	–6
National Conciliation Party	80,730	8.36	12	–2
Salvadoran Authentic Institutional Party	36,101	3.74	1	New
Democratic Action	35,565	3.68	1	–1
Salvadoran Popular Party	16,344	1.69	0	–1
Renovating Action Party	2,963	0.31	0	New
Popular Orientation Party	836	0.09	0	0
Centrist Republican Stable Movement	689	0.07	0	New
Total	965,231	100.00	60	0
Valid votes	965,231	87.62		
Invalid/blank votes	136,375	12.38		
Total votes	1,101,606	100.00		
Registered voters/turnout	2,623,000	42.00		
Source: Nohlen

== Bibliography ==
- Political Handbook of the world, 1985. New York, 1986.
- Acevedo, Carlos. 1991. "Las novedades de las elecciones del 10 de marzo." Estudios centroamericanos (ECA) 46, 507-508:71-76 (enero-febrero 1991).
- Arriaza Meléndez, Jorge. 1989. Historia de los procesos electorales en El Salvador (1811–1989). San Salvador: Instituto Salvadoreño de Estudios Políticos.
- Benítez Manaut, Raúl. 1990. "El Salvador: un equilibrio imperfecto entre los votos y las botas." Secuencia 17:71-92 (mayo-agosto de 1990).
- Córdova M., Ricardo. 1988. "Periodización del proceso de crisis (1979-1988)." El Salvador: guerra, política y paz (1979–1988). 1988. San Salvador: Graffiti. Pages 83–97 plus statistical tables.
- Eguizábal, Cristina. 1992. "Parties, programs, and politics in El Salvador." Goodman, Louis W., ed. 1992. Political parties and democracy in Central America. Boulder: Westview Press. Pages 135-160.
- Eguizábal, Cristina. 1992. "El Salvador: procesos electorales y democratización." Una tarea inconclusa: elecciones y democracia en America Latina: 1988-1991. 1992. San Jose: IIDH—CAPEL. Pages 41–65.
- García, José Z. 1989. "El Salvador: recent elections in historical perspective." Booth, John A. and Mitchell A. Seligson, eds. 1989. Elections and democracy in Central America. Chapel Hill: The University of North Carolina Press. Pages 60–92.
- Haggerty, Richard A., ed. 1990. El Salvador, a country study. Washington: Library of Congress, Federal Research Division.
- Karl, Terry. 1986. "Imposing consent? Electoralism vs. Democratization in El Salvador." Drake, Paul W. and Eduardo Silva, eds. 1986. Elections and democratization in Latin America, 1980-1985. La Jolla: Center for Iberian and Latin American Studies, Center for U.S.-Mexican Studies, Institute of the Americas, University of California, San Diego. Pages 9–36.
- Lungo Uclés, Mario. 1996. El Salvador in the eighties: counterinsurgency and revolution. Philadelphia: Temple University Press. (Based on his El Salvador en los 80: contrainsurgencia y revolución. 1990. San Jose: EDUCA—FLACSO.)
- Montes, Segundo. 1988. "Las elecciones del 20 de marzo de 1988." Estudios centroamericanos (ECA) 43, 473-474:175-190 (marzo-abril 1988).
- Montgomery, Tommie Sue. 1985. "El Salvador." Latin America and Caribbean Contemporary Record IV:471-502 (1984–1985).
- Montgomery, Tommie Sue. 1995. Revolution in El Salvador: from civil strife to civil peace. Boulder: Westview.
- Sharpe, Kenneth E. 1986. "El Salvador." Latin America and Caribbean Contemporary Record V:B275-B298 (1985–1986).
