= 1970 Salvadoran legislative election =

- 8 March 1970
- All 52 seats in the Legislative Assembly; 27 seats needed for a majority
Party	Leader	Vote %	Seats	+/–
PCN	Fidel Sánchez	59.75	34	+7
PDC		27.01	16	−3
UDN		6.14	1	New
Popular		5.42	1	−3
This lists parties that won seats. See the complete results below.

Legislative elections were held in El Salvador on 8 March 1970. The result was a victory for the National Conciliation Party, which won 34 of the 52 seats. However, the election was marred by massive fraud. Voter turnout was just 41.6%.

== Results ==
Party	Votes	%	Seats	+/–
National Conciliation Party	315,560	59.75	34	+7
Christian Democratic Party	142,659	27.01	16	–3
Nationalist Democratic Union	32,450	6.14	1	New
Salvadoran Popular Party	28,606	5.42	1	–3
National Revolutionary Movement	8,832	1.67	0	–2
Total	528,107	100.00	52	0
Valid votes	528,107	84.83		
Invalid/blank votes	94,463	15.17		
Total votes	622,570	100.00		
Registered voters/turnout	1,494,931	41.65		
Source: Nohlen

== Bibliography ==
- Political Handbook of the world, 1970. New York, 1971.
- Anderson, Thomas P. 1988. Politics in Central America: Guatemala, El Salvador, Honduras, and Nicaragua. New York: Praeger. Revised edition.
- Caldera T., Hilda. 1983. Historia del Partido Demócrata Cristiano de El Salvador. Tegucigalpa: Instituto Centroamericano de Estudios Políticos.
- Eguizábal, Cristina. 1984. "El Salvador: elecciones sin democracia." Polemica (Costa Rica) 14/15:16-33 (marzo-junio 1984).
- Haggerty, Richard A., ed. 1990. El Salvador, a country study. Washington: Library of Congress, Federal Research Division.
- Herman, Edward S. and Frank Brodhead. 1984. Demonstration elections: U.S.-staged elections in the Dominican Republic, Vietnam, and El Salvador. Boston: South End Press.
- Montgomery, Tommie Sue. 1995. Revolution in El Salvador: from civil strife to civil peace. Boulder: Westview.
- Webre, Stephen. 1979. José Napoleón Duarte and the Christian Democratic Party in Salvadoran Politics 1960-1972. Baton Rouge: Louisiana State University Press.
- White, Alastair. 1973. El Salvador. New York: Praeger Publishers.
- Williams, Philip J. and Knut Walter. 1997. Militarization and demilitarization in El Salvador's transition to democracy. Pittsburgh: University of Pittsburgh Press.
