= Inter-American Institute of Human Rights =

Academic and outreach institute for human rights in San José, Costa Rica

- Instituto Interamericano de Derechos Humanos
- Abbreviation: IIHR/IIDH
- Formation: 1980; 46 years ago
- Founder: Inter-American Court of Human Rights and government of Costa Rica
- Founded at: San José, Costa Rica
- Type: Nonprofit
- Purpose: Promotion of human rights
- Location: San José, Costa Rica
- Region served: America
- Official language: Spanish and English
- Main organ: General Assembly / Executive Committee
- Publication: Revista IIDH
- Parent organization: Inter-American Court of Human Rights and government of Costa Rica
- Website: www.iidh.ed.cr

The Inter-American Institute of Human Rights (IIHR) (Note: In Spanish: Instituto Interamericano de Derechos Humanos, IIDH; in French: Institut interaméricain des Droits de l'Homme; in Portuguese: Instituto Interamericano de Direitos Humanos.) is an autonomous international academic institution dedicated to the teaching, research and promotion of human rights. It was founded in 1980 by virtue of an agreement signed by the Inter-American Court of Human Rights and the government of Costa Rica, and is headquartered in that nation's capital city, San José. It complements the outreach work to promote human rights carried out by the Inter-American Court and the Inter-American Commission on Human Rights.

== Mission ==
Its stated mission is to "educate in human rights and promote their respect in order to contribute to the consolidation of democracy and justice in the Americas, in coordination with the organs of the inter-American system, civil society, academia and the state". It facilitates dialogue among different stakeholders in the human rights movement and state authorities; in keeping with its statute, however, it does not investigate specific human rights violations or monitor states' observance of their international obligations.

== Structure ==
The IIHR's supreme body is its general assembly, composed of human rights experts from across the Americas, which meets biannually to set policies and general parameters for the institute's work. Twelve members of the General Assembly make up the executive committee, which follows up on the Assembly's decisions and oversees and evaluates the institute's programs and activities. The institute also has an executive director, who serves as its legal representative.

In addition to its headquarters in San José, the IIHR maintains a regional office for South America in Montevideo, Uruguay, established in 2009.
