= National Coalition Party (El Salvador) =

National Coalition Party Partido de Concertación Nacional
- Abbreviation: PCN
- President: Manuel Rodríguez
- Founder: Julio Adalberto Rivera
- Founded: 30 September 1961; 64 years ago
- Registered: 23 September 2011; 14 years ago
- Split from: Christian Democratic Party
- Headquarters: Calle Los Granados #37, San Salvador, El Salvador
- Membership (2019): 7,200
- Ideology: Nationalism; Conservatism
- Political position: Center-right to right-wing
- Regional affiliation: Center-Democratic Integration Group
- Colours: Blue; White
- Slogan: «Towards Social Justice by the National Coalition» (Spanish: «Hacia la Justicia Social por la Concertación Nacional»)
- Seats in the Legislative Assembly: 2 / 60
- Mayors: 4 / 44
- Seats in the PARLACEN: 0 / 20

Party flag

Website
- pcnoficial.com

1982 election poster

The National Coalition Party (Spanish: Partido de Concertación Nacional, PCN) is a nationalist political party in El Salvador. Until 2011 it was known as the National Conciliation Party (Spanish: Partido de Conciliación Nacional, PCN). It was the most powerful political party in the country during the 1960s and 1970s, and was closely associated with the Salvadoran military. Julio Adalberto Rivera Carballo, a candidate of the National Conciliation Party, was elected president in 1962, and the next three presidents were also from the party. After the 1979 coup the party declined in influence but continued to exist.

== History ==
=== After 2000 ===
Today, it is considered relatively minor as compared with the three major organizations, ARENA, FMLN and Nuevas Ideas.

At the legislative elections, held on 16 March 2003, the party won 13.0% of the popular vote and 16 out of 84 seats in the Legislative Assembly. Its candidate in the presidential election of 21 March 2004, José Rafael Machuca Zelaya, won 2.7%. In the 12 March 2006 legislative election, the party won 11.0% of the popular vote and 10 out of 84 seats, a major decline in representation, but the party is still the third largest political party in El Salvador. At the January 18, 2009 legislative elections the party won 11 seats.

With no party holding a majority, it can be seen as holding the balance of power. However, it usually sides with the conservative ARENA party.

While the party was technically to be disbanded after the 2004 election, in which its candidate did not gather the necessary 3% of the vote, it was allowed to hold on to its registration by decree; this decree was declared unconstitutional on 30 April 2011, and the party was thus disbanded.

The party was de facto re-established, registering with the Supreme Electoral Tribunal as the National Coalition ('Concertación Nacional', CN) in September 2011. After one year, it added the word 'Partido' ("party") to its full name, which allowed it to again use the traditional acronym PCN. Since 2018, the party has 9 out of 84 congressmen and 25 out of 262 mayorship offices.

== Electoral history ==
=== Presidential elections ===
| Election | Candidate | First round | | | Second round | | | Result |
| Election | Candidate | Votes | % | Pos. | Votes | % | Pos. | Result |
|---|---|---|---|---|---|---|---|---|
| 1962 | Julio Adalberto Rivera Carballo | 368,801 | 100% | ▲1st | —N/a | | | Elected ✓ |
| 1967 | Fidel Sánchez Hernández | 267,447 | 54.37% | 1st | —N/a | | | Elected ✓ |
| 1972 | Arturo Armando Molina | 334,600 | 43.42% | 1st | 31 | 100.00% | ▲1st | Elected ✓ |
| 1977 | Carlos Humberto Romero | 812,281 | 67.30% | 1st | —N/a | | | Elected ✓ |
| 1982 | Unknown candidate | 0 | 0.00% | ▼3rd | —N/a | | | Lost ✗ |
| 1984 | Francisco José Guerrero | 244,556 | 19.31% | 3rd | —N/a | | | Lost ✗ |
| 1989 | Rafael Morán Castañeda | 38,218 | 4.07% | 3rd | —N/a | | | Lost ✗ |
| 1994 | Roberto Escobar García | 70,504 | 5.34% | ▼4th | —N/a | | | Lost ✗ |
| 1999 | Hernán Contreras | 45,140 | 3.82% | ▼5th | —N/a | | | Lost ✗ |
| 2004 | José Rafael Machuca Zelaya | 61,781 | 2.71% | ▲4th | —N/a | | | Lost ✗ |
| 2009 | Withdrew | | | | | | | |
| 2014 | Supported Antonio Saca (UNIDAD) | 307,603 | 11.44% | ▲3rd | —N/a | | | Lost ✗ |
| 2019 | Supported Carlos Calleja (ARENA) | 857,084 | 31.72% | ▲2nd | —N/a | | | Lost ✗ |
| 2024 | Supported Nayib Bukele (NI) | 2,701,725 | 84.65% | ▲1st | —N/a | | | Won ✓ |
| 2027 | Alirio García Flamenco | To be determined | | | Second round abolished | | | TBD |

=== Legislative Assembly elections ===
View source data.

| Election | Votes | % | Position | Seats | +/– | Status in legislature |
|---|---|---|---|---|---|---|
| 1961 | 207,701 | 60.10 | ▲1st | 54 / 54 | New | Supermajority government |
| 1964 | 176,620 | 58.57 | ▲1st | 32 / 52 | ▼22 | Government |
| 1966 | 207,586 | 53.62 | ▲1st | 31 / 52 | ▼1 | Government |
| 1968 | 212,661 | 47.67 | ▲1st | 27 / 52 | ▼4 | Government |
| 1970 | 315,560 | 59.75 | ▲1st | 34 / 52 | ▲7 | Government |
| 1972 | 353,775 | 67.39 | ▲1st | 39 / 52 | ▲5 | Supermajority government |
| 1974 | | | ▲1st | 36 / 52 | ▼3 | Supermajority government |
| 1976 | | | ▲1st | 52 / 52 | ▲18 | Supermajority government |
| 1978 | 766,673 | 90.28 | ▲1st | 50 / 54 | ▼2 | Supermajority government |
| 1982 | 273,383 | 18.61 | ▼3rd | 14 / 60 | ▼36 | Coalition government |
| 1985 | 80,730 | 8.36 | ▼3rd | 12 / 60 | ▼2 | In government |
| 1988 | 78,756 | 8.46 | ▼3rd | 7 / 60 | ▼5 | Coalition government |
| 1991 | 94,531 | 8.99 | ▼4th | 9 / 84 | ▲2 | Coalition government |
| 1994 | 83,520 | 6.21 | ▼4th | 4 / 84 | ▼5 | Coalition government |
| 1997 | 97,362 | 8.70 | ▲3rd | 11 / 84 | ▲7 | Coalition government |
| 2000 | 106,802 | 8.82 | ▲3rd | 13 / 84 | ▲2 | Coalition government |
| 2003 | 181,167 | 12.95 | ▲3rd | 16 / 84 | ▲3 | Coalition government |
| 2006 | 172,341 | 11.42 | ▲3rd | 10 / 84 | ▼6 | Coalition government |
| 2009 | 194,751 | 8.79 | ▲3rd | 11 / 84 | ▲1 | Opposition |
| 2012 | 157,074 | 7.18 | ▼4th | 7 / 84 | ▼4 | Opposition |
| 2015 | 154,093 | 6.77 | ▼4th | 4 / 84 | ▼3 | Opposition |
| 2018 | 230,862 | 10.87 | ▲3rd | 9 / 84 | ▲5 | Coalition government |
| 2021 | 102,848 | 4.12 | ▼5th | 2 / 84 | ▼7 | In government |
| 2024 | 101,641 | 3.26 | ▲3rd | 2 / 60 | 0 | In government |
| 2027 | To be determined | | | | | |

== See also ==
- List of political parties in El Salvador
- Politics of El Salvador
