= 1978 Salvadoran legislative election =

- 12 March 1978
- All 54 seats in the Legislative Assembly; 28 seats needed for a majority
Party	Leader	Vote %	Seats	+/–
PCN	Carlos Romero	90.28	50	−2
Popular		9.72	4	+4
This lists parties that won seats. See the complete results below.

Legislative elections were held in El Salvador on 12 March 1978. The elections were boycotted by all but one of the opposition parties, resulting in an easy victory for the ruling National Conciliation Party, which won 50 of the 54 seats.

== Results ==
Party	Votes	%	Seats	+/–
National Conciliation Party	766,673	90.28	50	–2
Salvadoran Popular Party	82,535	9.72	4	+4
Total	849,208	100.00	54	+2
Registered voters/turnout	1,800,000	–		
Source: Nohlen

== Bibliography ==
- Political Handbook of the world, 1978. New York, 1979.
- Anderson, Thomas P. 1988. Politics in Central America: Guatemala, El Salvador, Honduras, and Nicaragua. New York: Praeger. Revised edition.
- Herman, Edward S. and Frank Brodhead. 1984. Demonstration elections: U.S.-staged elections in the Dominican Republic, Vietnam, and El Salvador. Boston: South End Press.
- Montgomery, Tommie Sue. 1995. Revolution in El Salvador: from civil strife to civil peace. Boulder: Westview.
- Webre, Stephen. 1979. José Napoleón Duarte and the Christian Democratic Party in Salvadoran Politics 1960-1972. Baton Rouge: Louisiana State University Press.
