= 2000 Salvadoran legislative election =

← 1997	12 March 2000	2003 →
- All 84 seats in the Legislative Assembly; 43 seats needed for a majority
Party	Leader	Vote %	Seats	+/–
ARENA	Alfredo Cristiani	36.04	29	+1
FMLN	Fabio Castillo Figueroa	35.22	31	+4
PCN	Ciro Cruz Zepeda	8.82	13	+2
PDC	René Aguiluz	7.19	6	−4
CDU	Rubén Zamora	5.38	3	New
PAN	Horacio Rios	3.71	2	New
This lists parties that won seats. See the complete results below.
Results by constituency

Legislative elections were held in El Salvador on 12 March 2000. Although the Nationalist Republican Alliance received the most votes, the Farabundo Martí National Liberation Front won the most seats. Voter turnout was 42%.

== Results ==
Party	Votes	%	Seats	+/–
Nationalist Republican Alliance	436,169	36.04	29	+1
Farabundo Martí National Liberation Front	426,289	35.22	31	+4
National Conciliation Party	106,802	8.82	13	+2
Christian Democratic Party	87,074	7.19	6	–4
United Democratic Centre	65,070	5.38	3	New
National Action Party	44,901	3.71	2	New
Social Christian Union	23,329	1.93	0	New
Liberal Democratic Party	15,639	1.29	0	–2
Popular Labor Party	4,996	0.41	0	New
Total	1,210,269	100.00	84	0
Valid votes	1,210,269	96.33		
Invalid/blank votes	46,073	3.67		
Total votes	1,256,342	100.00		
Registered voters/turnout	3,007,233	41.78		
Source: Nohlen

== Bibliography ==
- Political Handbook of the world, 1997. New York, 1998.
