= 1976 Salvadoran legislative election =

- 14 March 1976
- All 52 seats in the Legislative Assembly; 27 seats needed for a majority
Party	Leader	Seats	+/–
PCN	Arturo Molina	52	+16
This lists parties that won seats. See the complete results below.

Legislative elections were held in El Salvador on 14 March 1976. The result was a victory for the ruling National Conciliation Party, which was the only party to contest the elections due to a boycott by the opposition as a result of massive electoral fraud.

== Results ==
Party	Seats	+/–
National Conciliation Party	52	+16
Total	52	0
Source: Nohlen

== Bibliography ==
- Political Handbook of the world, 1976. New York, 1977.
- Herman, Edward S. and Frank Brodhead. 1984. Demonstration elections: U.S.-staged elections in the Dominican Republic, Vietnam, and El Salvador. Boston: South End Press.
- Montgomery, Tommie Sue. 1995. Revolution in El Salvador: from civil strife to civil peace. Boulder: Westview.
- Webre, Stephen. 1979. José Napoleón Duarte and the Christian Democratic Party in Salvadoran Politics 1960-1972. Baton Rouge: Louisiana State University Press.
