= Military dictatorship in El Salvador =

1931–1979 military regime in El Salvador

Republic of El Salvador República de El Salvador (Spanish)
- 1931–1979
- Flag Coat of arms
- Motto: Dios, Unión, Libertad "God, Union, Liberty"
- Anthem: Himno Nacional de El Salvador "National Anthem of El Salvador"
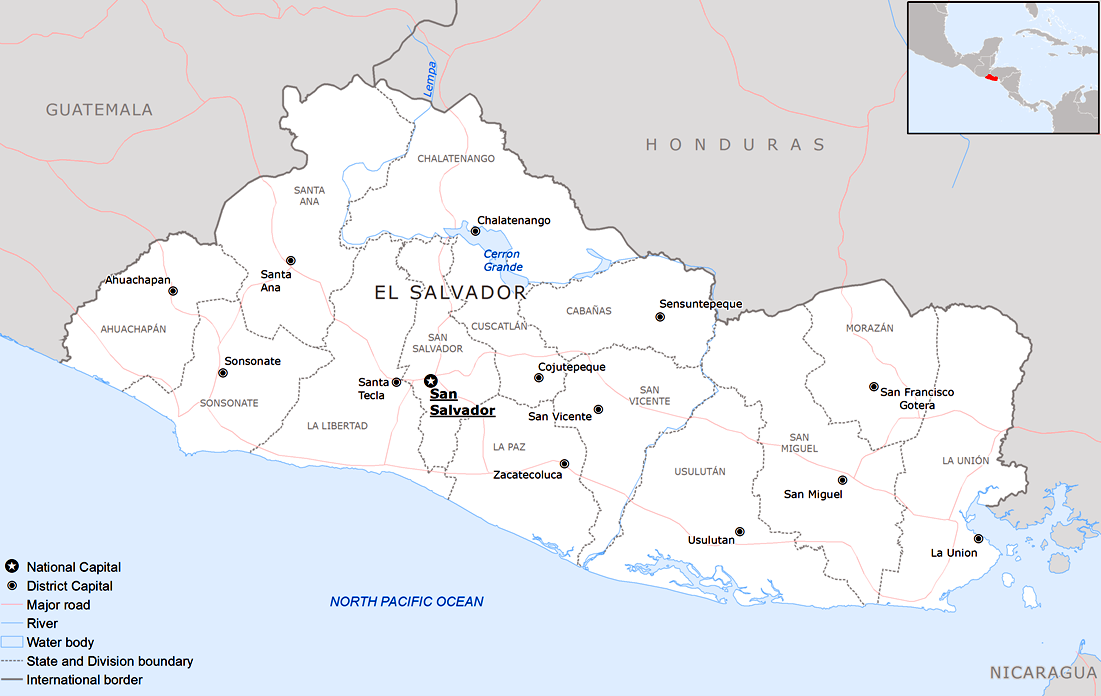
- Capital and largest city: San Salvador; 13°42′N 89°12′W
- Common languages: Spanish
- Demonym: Salvadoran
- Government: Unitary presidential republic under an authoritarian military dictatorship
- President
  - 1931–1934, 1935–1944: Maximiliano Hernández Martínez (first)
  - 1977–1979: Carlos Humberto Romero (last)
- Legislature: Legislative Assembly
- Historical era: Interwar period, World War II, Cold War
  - Established: 2 December 1931
  - Strike of Fallen Arms: 9 May 1944
  - Football War: 14–18 July 1969
  - Overthrown: 15 October 1979

Population
  - 1950: 2,200,000
  - 1970: 3,736,000
- Currency: Salvadoran colón
| Preceded by | Succeeded by |
| Meléndez–Quiñónez dynasty | Revolutionary Government Junta |
- Today part of: El Salvador

The Salvadoran military dictatorship was the period in Salvadoran history when the Armed Forces of El Salvador (FAES) governed the country for almost 48 years from 1931 to 1979. The military dictatorship governed in an authoritarian manner, limited political rights throughout, and maintained its governance through rigged elections.

The military came to power in El Salvador when the first democratically elected president, Arturo Araujo, was overthrown in a military coup d'état on 2 December 1931. The military appointed Araujo's vice president, General Maximiliano Hernández Martínez, as acting president on 4 December 1931. He remained in office until he was forced to resign on 9 May 1944 following strikes and protests by students (Note: known as the Strike of Fallen Arms.) in the capital of San Salvador. He was followed by three short-lived presidents, who were then succeeded by Óscar Osorio in 1950. His successor, José María Lemus, was overthrown in a military coup d'état in 1960 and was replaced by Julio Adalberto Rivera Carballo in 1962. From 1962 to 1979, the National Conciliation Party (PCN) ruled the country in a de facto one party state; opposition parties existed, but in practice held no real power. The military regime ended on 15 October 1979, when young military officers overthrew President Carlos Humberto Romero and established the Revolutionary Government Junta, a joint civilian-military government which ruled the country from 1979 until the presidential elections of 1982. The fall of the military government marked the beginning of the twelve-year-long Salvadoran Civil War which lasted until 1992.

Many atrocities and human rights violations were committed under the Salvadoran military government. Under Martínez, the Salvadoran Army massacred anywhere from 10,000 to 40,000 peasants and indigenous people in response to a communist uprising in 1932, in an event known in El Salvador as La Matanza. (Note: "La Matanza" is Spanish for "the Massacre.") The Nationalist Democratic Organization was established by Rivera in 1965. It was a collection of far-right paramilitaries and death squads that tortured political opponents, intimidated voters, rigged elections, and killed peasants. President Fidel Sánchez Hernández initiated the Football War with Honduras in July 1969, claiming that the Honduran government had allowed violence targeting Salvadorans to go unchecked following El Salvador's victory over Honduras in the 1970 FIFA World Cup qualifiers. In March 1979, President Romero ordered soldiers to fire on a crowd of protestors using live ammunition. The military regime received support from the United States due to its anti-communist stance, which aligned with the United States' Cold War interests.

== Background ==
=== Meléndez–Quiñónez dynasty ===
Manuel Enrique Araujo became President of El Salvador on 1 March 1911. He was president until his assassination on 9 February 1913 by farmers. He was succeeded by Carlos Meléndez who served as acting president until 29 August 1914 when he was succeeded by Alfonso Quiñónez Molina.

Carlos Meléndez and Quiñónez established a political dynasty under the National Democratic Party (PND) which lasted from 1913 until 1927. Carlos Meléndez was president from 1 March 1915 until his resignation on 21 December 1918. He later died on 8 October 1919 in New York City. Meléndez was succeeded by Quiñónez until his younger brother, Jorge Meléndez, was elected President. Jorge Meléndez was president from 1 March 1919 until 1 March 1923 when he was succeeded by Quiñónez who remained in power until 1 March 1927. Quiñónez's vice president, Pío Romero Bosque, succeeded him on 1 March 1927.

Unlike his predecessors, Romero Bosque did not appoint a successor and held El Salvador's first free election, ending the Meléndez–Quiñónez dynasty. In the election, Labor Party (PL) candidate Arturo Araujo, a relative of Araujo, won 46.65 percent of the vote and became president on 1 March 1931. Araujo's vice president was General Maximiliano Hernández Martínez of the National Republican Party.

=== Economic crisis ===
Araujo became president during a severe economic crisis due to the effects of the Great Depression. From 1871 to 1927, El Salvador was called a "coffee republic" due to its heavy reliance on coffee exports to sustain its economy. However, because of the Great Depression, coffee prices fell 54 percent and the Salvadoran economy was unable to sustain itself. Because of the economic crisis, wages fell, food supplies became limited, and living conditions worsened. The crisis caused peasant unrest across western El Salvador, and as a result, Araujo appointed Martínez to be the country's Minister of National Defense. Araujo attempted to implement a tax reform to combat the economic crisis, however, resistance from wealthy landowners caused the reforms to fail.

Araujo cut expenditures to the military and refused to pay its soldiers which caused anger within the military. The military moved to overthrow Araujo and on 2 December 1931, the Army overthrew his government at 10 pm local time. The coup was a watershed moment in Salvadoran history since it began the nearly 48 year long military dictatorship of the country.

== Martinato ==
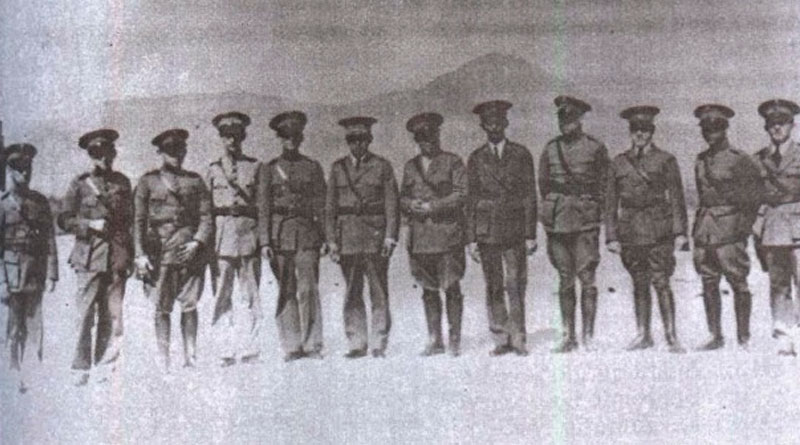
The Civic Directory of El Salvador in December 1931

The military established the Civic Directory, a junta composed of military officers, to govern the country on 2 December 1931. The directory was co-chaired by Colonels Osmín Aguirre y Salinas and Joaquín Valdés. The directory was dissolved on 4 December and power was transferred to Martínez who assumed dictatorial powers as acting president. Martínez promised to hold a legislative election in January 1932, but when the Communist Party won many municipalities, he canceled the election results. Further elections were also canceled. The elections did, however, give the government a list of communist party members. The list allowed the government to arrest prominent communist leaders on 18 January 1932.

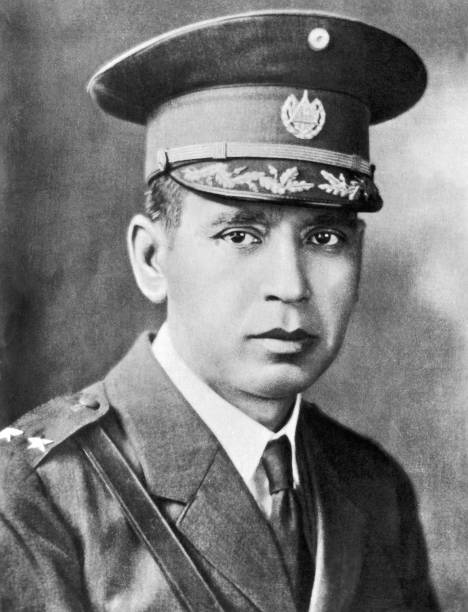
General Maximiliano Hernández Martínez was President from 1931 to 1944.

The communist party believed that democracy had failed them, and communists and peasants across the country, led by Farabundo Martí, Feliciano Ama, Mario Zapata, and Alfonso Luna. Peasants rose up on 22 January 1932 in Ahuachapán, Santa Tecla, and Sonsonate, killing at most 100 people in the uprising. Martínez responded by sending the military to crush the revolt. In Martínez's crackdown, around 10,000 to 40,000 peasants were killed. The event is known as La Matanza, "the Massacre," in El Salvador. The Constitutional Assembly issued Legislative Decree No. 121 on 11 July 1932, which granted unconditional amnesty to anyone who committed crimes of any nature during La Matanza in order to "restore order, repress, persecute, punish and capture those accused of the crime of rebellion of this year."

Because of the 1923 Central American Treaty of Peace and Amity, the United States refused to recognize Martínez's government's legitimacy. The US only recognized his government after the events of La Matanza. Martínez eventually denounced El Salvador's membership of the treaty on 26 December 1932.

Martínez helped El Salvador's financial situation improve during his presidency. On 23 February 1932, Martínez suspended payment on foreign debt, and again on 1 January 1938, but the debt was eventually paid off in 1938. The Central Reserve Bank of El Salvador was established during his administration on 19 June 1934 to help stabilize the colón, the national currency. He appointed Luis Alfaro Durán as president of the Central Bank. Martínez established Social Improvement, a welfare program to support poor peasants in July 1932.

The Martínez regime sought to maintain the image of democratic legitimacy in the nation. Martínez won the 1935, 1939, and 1944 presidential elections under the banner of the National Pro Patria Party (PNPP). His party also won legislative elections in 1936, 1939, and 1944, however, for both the legislative and presidential elections, he was the only candidate, the PNPP was the only legal political party, and election results were sometimes not publicized.

=== World War II ===
Martínez was personally sympathetic to Nazi Germany and Fascist Italy. He appointed Wehrmacht General Eberhardt Bohnstedt as the director of the Military School. The Salvadoran Air Force purchased aircraft from Italy in 1938 for US$39,000 with some of the payment being made with coffee. Minister of National Defense Andrés Ignacio Menéndez attempted to purchase planes from the United States but North American Aviation refused to accept coffee as a percentage of the payment. El Salvador was one of the first nations to recognize the Nationalists under Francisco Franco as the legitimate government of Spain in 1936. El Salvador was also the first country after Japan to recognize the independence of Manchukuo.

Some Salvadorans supported the Axis as on 10 June 1940, the day Italy joined the Second World War, 300 men dressed like the Italian Blackshirts marched in the streets of San Salvador in support of Italy; however, the government suppressed the march. Under pressure from the United States, the government fully supported the Allies on 8 December 1941 after the Japanese attack on Pearl Harbor. El Salvador declared war on Japan on 8 December and then later Germany and Italy on 12 December. The government arrested German, Italian, and Japanese nationals and seized their land. El Salvador never provided soldiers to directly fight in the war but it did send workers to maintain the Panama Canal. During the war, George Mantello and Colonel José Castellanos Contreras saved 40,000 Jews from Central Europe, mostly from Hungary, by providing them false Salvadoran passports and political asylum.

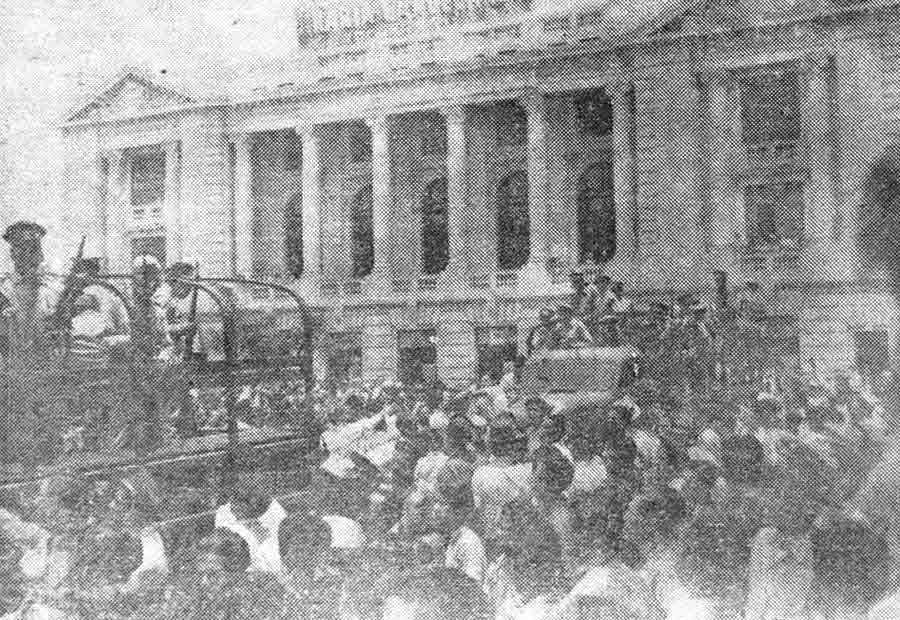
The Palm Sunday Coup attempt.

In 1944, Martínez held an election and elected himself to a third term as president. The move angered many politicians, military officers, bankers, and businessmen since it overtly violated the constitution. On 2 April 1944, Palm Sunday, pro-Axis military officers attempted a coup against Martínez. The 1st Infantry Regiment and the 2nd Artillery Regiment rose up in San Salvador and Santa Ana and seized the national radio station, took control of the Air Force, and captured the Santa Ana police station. Martínez was able to take control of the situation and ordered military units still loyal to put down the uprising which was accomplished by 3 April. Reprisals lasted for two weeks, martial law was declared, and a national curfew was established.

Civilians wanted to remove Martínez from power and so on 2 May 1944, students took to the streets of San Salvador in the Strike of Fallen Arms to force his resignation. The students engaged in non-violence to oppose the government. On 7 May, the police shot and killed José Wright Alcaine, a 17-year-old who was a US citizen, which put pressure on Martínez to resign. Martínez resigned on 9 May and left for exile in Guatemala. Menéndez replaced Martínez as acting president and accepted the protestors' demands for amnesty for political prisoners, freedom of the press, and new general elections. His term in office was short-lived as he was overthrown in a military coup d'état on 20 October 1944 and replaced by Aguirre. Aguirre held the promised elections in January 1945. He was accused of rigging the election in favor of a candidate he supported and the election resulted in General Salvador Castaneda Castro becoming president with 99.70% of the vote. Castaneda was deposed in a coup d'état on 14 December 1948 by young military officers. The coup, known as the Major's Coup, forced all Salvadoran military officers above the rank of lieutenant colonel to resign. The young officers established the Revolutionary Council of Government which governed the country until Major Óscar Osorio, the chairman of the Revolutionary Council of Government, was elected President in 1950.

== Revolutionary Party rule ==
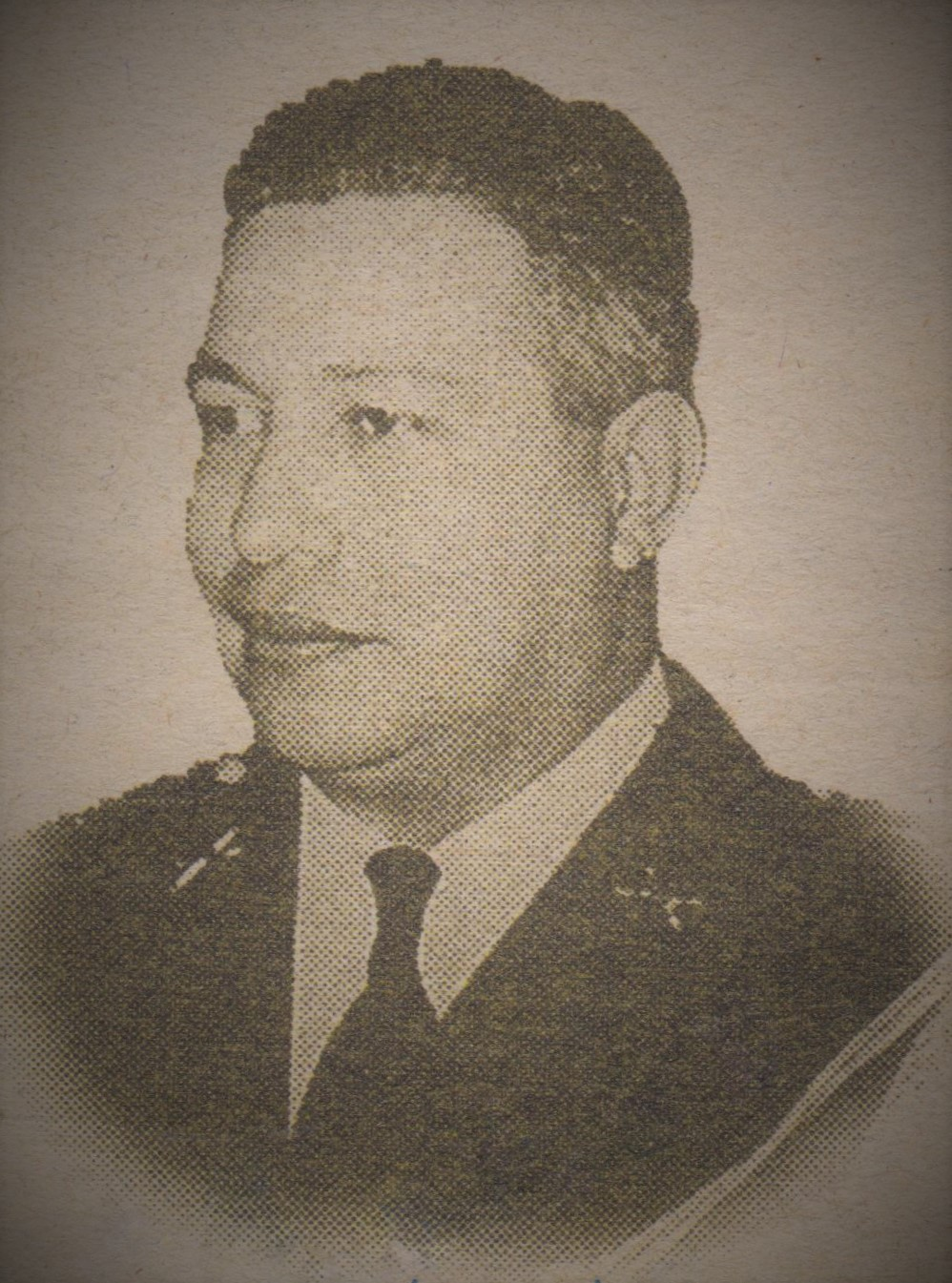
Lieutenant Colonel Óscar Osorio Hernández was president from 1950 to 1956.

Osorio Hernández ran under the banner of the Revolutionary Party of Democratic Unification (PRUD). He became President of El Salvador on 14 September 1950 under a new constitution. Osorio Hernández's policies supported economic development, agricultural reform, and social security programs, although policies like agrarian reform were not implemented as to not alienate wealthy landlords and oligarchs.

Osorio Hernández was succeeded by Lieutenant Colonel José María Lemus on 14 September 1956 following the 1956 presidential election. In the election, Roberto Edmundo Cannessa of the National Action Party, his primary and most popular opponent, was disqualified by the Central Electoral Council a month before the election which led to his landslide victory. In office, he granted amnesty to many political prisoners and exiled politicians. He also repealed several repressive laws instituted by his predecessors. Following the Cuban Revolution in 1959, students in El Salvador were influenced by the nationalistic and revolutionary movement of Fidel Castro which led to protests for a truly democratic system to be implemented in the country. In response, Lemus abandoned his reforms and cracked down on freedom of expression and arrested political opponents. Lemus' turn to authoritarianism caused the military to turn against him and he was overthrown on 26 October 1960.

The military established the Junta of Government and was led by Lieutenant Colonel Miguel Ángel Castillo. Fabio Castillo Figueroa, one of the three civilian members of the junta, had pro-Castro views who was seen as a potential threat by the military. The military overthrew the junta and replaced it with another junta, the Civic-Military Directory. Lieutenant Colonel Julio Adalberto Rivera Carballo served as the chairman of the new junta and promised new elections for 1962.

== Conciliation Party rule ==
The junta was dissolved on 25 January 1962 and an independent politician, Eusebio Rodolfo Cordón Cea, was appointed as Provisional President. During the 1962 presidential election, the newly formed National Conciliation Party (PCN) ran unopposed and its candidate, Rivera, won 100% of the vote. He became president on 1 July 1962 under a new constitution.

Although only the PCN had a candidate in the 1962 presidential election, other parties had formed and ran in the 1961 legislative election but gained no seats. The most prominent opposition party was the Christian Democratic Party (PDC). The party formed in 1960 and had broad support from the middle class. The party came under attack from both the political left and right, with the left believing the party would uphold the capitalist economic system and increase wealth gaps while the right saw the party as a socialist reactionary movement that threatened their wealth and power. The party, under Abraham Rodríguez Portillo and Roberto Lara Velado, believed Christian democracy was the best path forward for El Salvador's modernization. The party's ideology was inspired by Pope Leo XIII's Rerum novarum and from the works of Pope John XXIII and French philosopher Jacques Maritain. The party was also inspired from other Christian democratic movements in Chile and Venezuela.

Rivera got El Salvador involved in US President John F. Kennedy's Alliance for Progress, an initiative to improve relations between Latin America and the United States through economic cooperation. He supported the implementation of agrarian reform but it was never actually implemented. He established the National Security Agency of El Salvador (ANSESAL) in 1965. It served as the national intelligence agency of the country and it oversaw the operations of the National Democratic Organization (ORDEN), a group of paramilitaries that killed peasants, rigged elections, and intimidated voters.

Rivera instituted electoral reforms by allowed opposition political parties to run in presidential elections and compete in legislative elections. Previously, whichever party won the most votes in a certain department, that party won all seats and all representation for that department, but under his reforms, seats and representatives were elected proportional to how many votes a party got. The reform allowed the PDC to gain 14 seats and the Renovating Action Party (PAR) won 6 seats in the Constitutional Assembly in the 1964 legislative elections. In the election, José Napoleón Duarte, a prominent PDC politician, was elected as Mayor of San Salvador.

The PCN maintained its control on power with United States support and through the country's continued economic growth. In the 1967 presidential election, the PCN won with 54.37% of the vote with the PDC's nominee, Rodríguez Portillo, coming in second place with 21.62%. Fidel Sánchez Hernández of the PCN became president on 1 July 1967.

=== Football War ===
In the late 1960s, around 300,000 Salvadorans migrated to Honduras, many of whom entered the country illegally. On 3 October 1963, Oswaldo López Arellano overthrew President Ramón Villeda Morales of Honduras and established a military dictatorship. During López Arellano's regime, the Honduran economy staggered and he blamed the country's economic issues on the Salvadoran immigrants who were stealing Honduran jobs.

During the 1970 FIFA World Cup qualifiers, Honduras and El Salvador competed in separate groups for the Confederation of North, Central American and Caribbean Association Football (CONCACAF) qualifications, Honduras was in Group 3 and El Salvador was in Group 4, both winning their respective groups. The met each other in the semifinals. Honduras won the first match in Tegucigalpa 1–0 on 8 June 1969. Salvador won the second match in San Salvador 3–0 on 15 June. Both matches witnessed violence from fans on both sides. During the second match, the Salvadorans raised a dirty rag instead of the Honduran flag. One of the players of the Honduran team, José Cardona, reportedly stated, "We're awfully lucky that we lost. Otherwise we wouldn't be alive today." The loss caused Honduran civilians to attack Salvadoran immigrants. Salvadorans were murdered, assaulted, and had their homes burned, forcing 17,000 to flee back to El Salvador. The Salvadorans called the attacks on the Salvadorans a massacre.

A third match was held in Mexico City on 26 June to decide who would go on to the final round against Haiti. The Salvadorans defeated the Honduras 3–2 in extra time and the Salvadoran team advanced to the finals. The defeat caused further attacks against the Salvadoran immigrants and led to a migrant crisis in El Salvador since the government was unable to provide housing for all the refugees coming from Honduras.

Due to the ongoing crisis, El Salvador severed diplomatic ties with Honduras on 26 June and declared war on 14 July 1969. The Salvadoran Air Force attacked the Toncontín International Airport to disable the Honduran Air Force and the Salvadoran Army launched a two prong invasion following two major roads connecting the two countries. After two days, the Honduran Air Force began attacking Salvadoran air bases in Chalatenango and La Unión, halting the Salvadoran advance. After four days of fighting, the Organization of American States (OAS) negotiated a cease fire on 18 July. El Salvador withdrew its troops on 2 August and the OAS promised to guarantee the safety of the Salvadorans in Honduras. Around 2,000 people, most of whom were civilians, were killed during the war.

Initially, Salvadoran politics were united against Honduras, but the Communist Party and the left eventually turned against the war and continued to oppose the government. The war also caused the Salvadoran economy to stagnate and many refugees overcrowded the country.

=== Political and social tensions ===
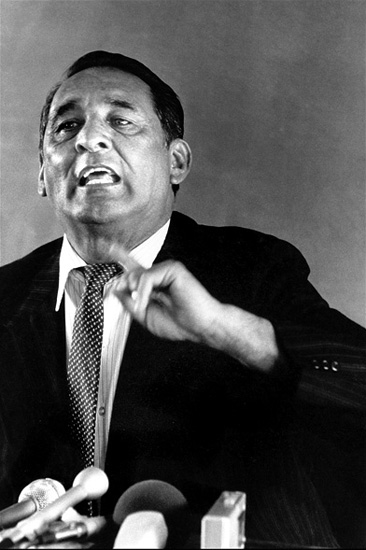
José Napoleón Duarte was the UNO presidential candidate in 1972 and was exiled to Venezuela after a coup attempt in 1972.

The refugees coming from Honduras to El Salvador received little to no aid or support from the Salvadoran government. To the refugees, now living in poverty, left-wing groups such as the United Front for Revolutionary Action (FUAR), Unified Popular Action Front (FAPU), and Christian Federation of Salvadoran Peasants (FECCAS) seemed as the only opportunity to raise themselves out of poverty. As a result, left-wing militant organizations grew in size and numbers and continued to gain more support among the poor population. The increased support led to an increase in left-wing terrorist actions against the government.

The PDC gained more support from the refugees as well. The PDC advocated for land and agrarian reform to gain the support of the voter base. The refugees coming from Honduras had no land to farm like they had in Honduras so they overwhelmingly supported the PDC. In January 1970, the government established the National Agrarian Reform Congress to begin implementing agrarian reforms that were demanded for by the people. The congress consisted of members that were from the government, the opposition, labor groups, and businesses.

The PDC lost 3 seats in the Constitutional Assembly in the 1970 legislative elections while the PCN gained 7 seats. The election was claimed to have been rigged by the PCN to ensure they would gain seats and retain a majority. In 1972, the PDC joined forced with two other political parties, the National Revolutionary Movement (MRN) and the Nationalist Democratic Union (UDN), to run in the 1972 presidential and legislative elections under the banner of the National Opposition Union (UNO). Colonel Arturo Armando Molina was the candidate of the PCN while Duarte was the PDC candidate. The Central Election Board stated that Duarte had won by 9,000 votes with 327,000 votes compared to Molina's 318,000, but the PCN called for a recount. A recount was conducted and the statement was changed and it declared that Molina won by 10,000 votes. The final result was that Molina won 43.42% of the vote while Duarte won 42.14%. Duarte and Guillermo Ungo, his running mate, petitioned for a second recount but the petition was denied. UNO also lost 9 seats in the 1972 legislative election while the PCN gained 5 more seats.

On 25 March 1972, a group of young left-leaning military officers called the Military Youth attempted a coup d'état against Sánchez Hernández to prevent Molina from becoming president. The officers were led by Colonel Benjamin Mejía and their goal was to establish a revolutionary junta and establish Duarte as president. The coup plotters captured Sánchez Hernández and the National Palace. Duarte announced his support for the coup and the coup plotters called for garrisons to support the coup, however, the Air Force attacked the National Palace and garrisons engaged the revolutionaries. By 26 March, the coup was over and 200 were killed. Sánchez Hernández retook power and Duarte was arrested. He was initially sentenced to death but it was commuted to torture and he was exiled to Venezuela.

Molina took office on 1 July 1972. On 19 July, he had tanks attack the University of El Salvador. Around 800 were arrested and another 15 were exiled to Nicaragua. He closed the university for two years to "eliminate the opposition." Molina attempted to institute land reform in 1976 but it only increased political unrest since the reforms redistributed little to no land to the peasants.

UNO selected Ernesto Antonio Claramount Roseville as its candidate for the 1977 presidential election while the PCN selected incumbent Minister of National Defense General Carlos Humberto Romero as its nominee. Romero was declared to have the election with 67.30% of the vote while according to witnesses, Claramount actually won with 75% of the vote. Romero assumed office on 1 July 1977.

== Collapse of the regime ==
When the Nicaraguan Revolution began in 1978, Romero grew concerned that the revolution would spread to El Salvador. He attempted to begin negotiation with the opposition to ensure that did not happen, but his attempt emboldened opposition forces who took to the streets of San Salvador to strike in March 1979. Romero cracked down on the strikes and ordered his soldiers to fire live ammunition into the crowds to end the strike. The event was broadcast in the United States and Europe which resulted in Costa Rica, Japan, Switzerland, the United Kingdom and West Germany closing their respective embassies in El Salvador.

President Anastasio Somoza Debayle of Nicaragua was finally deposed by the Sandinista National Liberation Front (FSLN) in September 1979 which caused alarm among young military officers in the Salvadoran Army. The Military Youth, led by Colonels Adolfo Arnoldo Majano and Jaime Abdul Gutiérrez staged a coup d'état against Romero on 15 October 1979 with the support of the United States. Romero fled for exile in Guatemala, as did Federico Castillo Yanes, the Minister of National Defense.

On 18 October 1979, the military established the Revolutionary Government Junta. The junta was composed of five men: Colonels Majano and Gutiérrez, Ungo, Mario Antonio Andino, the former president of the Chamber of Commerce and Industry of El Salvador (CCIES), and Román Mayorga Quirós, a member of the Central American University.

The coup of October 1979 marked the end of the military regime of El Salvador and many mark it as the start of the Salvadoran Civil War. The civil war lasted until 1992 with the signing of the Chapultepec Peace Accords.

== See also ==
- Films depicting Latin American military dictatorships
- Somoza family

== Bibliography ==
- Armstrong, Robert; Shenk, Janet (1982). El Salvador: The Face of Revolution. Boston: South End Press. ISBN 0896081389.
- Carmelo Francisco Esmeralda Astilla (1976). "The Martinez Era: Salvadoran-American Relations, 1931-1944". Louisiana State University and Agricultural & Mechanical College.
- Federal Research Division Library of Congress (1990). Haggerty, Richard A. (ed.). El Salvador: A Country Study (PDF). Washington, D.C.: The Library of Congress.
- Williams, Philip J.; Walter, Knut (15 December 1997). Militarization and Demilitarization in El Salvador's Transition to Democracy. Pittsburgh: University of Pittsburgh Press. ISBN 9780822971863.
