= Revolutionary Council of Government (El Salvador) =

Military junta of El Salvador

- Military junta of El Salvador

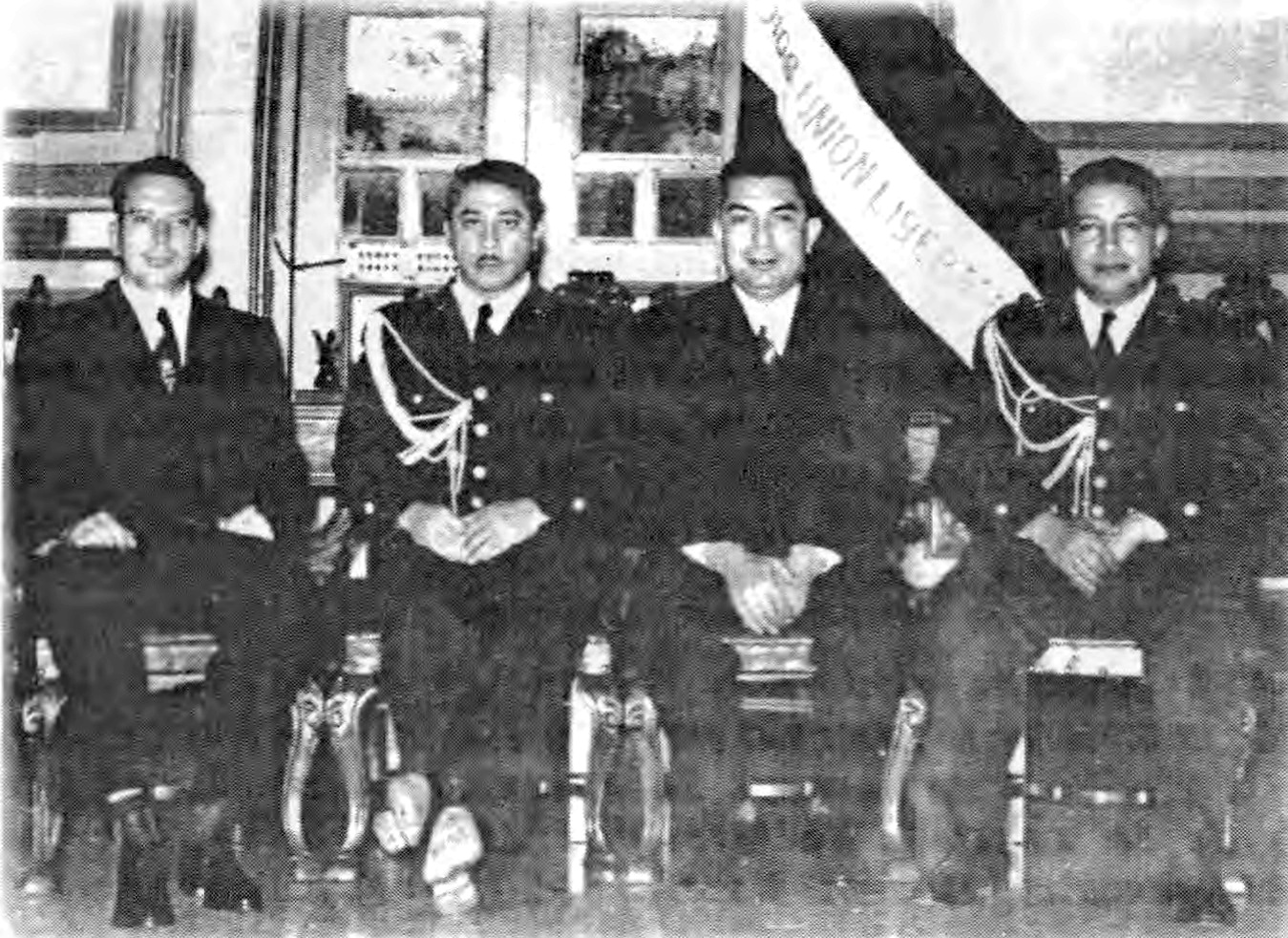
- Members of the Revolutionary Council of Government
- Date formed: 14 December 1948
- Date dissolved: 14 September 1950

People and organisations
- No. of ministers: 5
- Member party: Armed Forces of El Salvador

The Revolutionary Council of Government (Spanish: Consejo de Gobierno Revolucionario, abbreviated CGR) was a military junta that ruled El Salvador between 1948 and 1950. The junta consisted of three military officers and two civilians.

== Background ==
Salvadoran president Brigadier General Maximiliano Hernández Martínez resigned and fled El Salvador in May 1944 following the Strike fo Fallen Arms. His successor, Brigadier General Andrés Ignacio Menéndez, was overthrown by the military in October 1944 and Colonel Osmín Aguirre y Salinas scheduled a presidential election for January 1945. Aguirre rigged the election in favor of General Salvador Castaneda Castro. During Castaneda's presidency, he worried that reformist junior military officers would threaten his rule and sent them to foreign training to keep them out of the country.

Ahead of the 1949 presidential election, the Legislative Assembly issued a decree on 13 December 1948 to allow Castaneda to seek re-election in 1949 as the country's constitution prohibited re-election. The following day, the junior officers overthrew Castaneda in a coup d'état known as the Majors' Coup. They viewed Castaneda's continuismo as the military's "old guard" ("vieja guardia") attempting to stay in power, effectively threatening their reformist objectives. The coup leaders established the Revolutionary Council of Government (CGR), a military junta, to govern El Salvador. The CGR consisted of Lieutenant Colonel Manuel de Jesús Córdova, Major Óscar Osorio, Major Óscar Adán Bolaños, Doctor Humberto Costa, and Doctor Reynaldo Galindo Pohl. Major Humberto Villalta, a prominent reformer, was excluded from the junta as he was viewed as being too radical.

== History ==
On 16 December 1948, the CGR declared that the military was "the armed arm of the people" ("el brazo armando del pueblo") and promised to implement reforms. It also promised to hold democratic elections and establish a new political system with a new constitution. A commission drafted a new constitution from February to August 1949.

Osorio resigned from the CGR on 23 October 1949 so that he could run as a candidate in the 1950 presidential election. On 31 January 1950, the CGR set the date for the presidential and legislative elections for 26 March and called for the formation of a constituent assembly. In the presidential election, Osorio ran as a member of the Revolutionary Party of Democratic Unification (PRUD) and defeated José Ascencio Menéndez of the Renovating Action Party (PAR) with 56.4 percent of the vote. Osorio became President of El Salvador on 14 September 1950 and the CGR dissolved. Similarly, PRUD won 38 of the Legislative Assembly's 52 seats. PRUD ruled El Salvador until the 1960 coup d'état overthrew Osorio's successor, Lieutenant Colonel José María Lemus.

== See also ==
- Military dictatorship in El Salvador
