= Renovating Action Party =

Salvadoran political party

Renovating Action Party Partido Acción Renovadora
- Abbreviation: PAR
- Founder: José Asencio Menéndez
- Founded: May 1944; 82 years ago
- Dissolved: 12 May 1967; 59 years ago
- Ideology: Reformism; Social democracy; Socialism; Faction: Communism (after 1964)
- Political position: Left-wing
- National affiliation: Union of Democratic Parties (1961)
- Colors: White and blue

Party flag

The Renovating Action Party (Spanish: Partido Acción Renovadora) was a left-wing Salvadoran political party that existed from 1944 to 1967. The party had three distinct phases of its existence under the leaderships of Colonel José Asencio Menéndez (1944–1950), the old line (1950–1964), and the new line (1964–1967).

From 1944 to 1950, PAR was a personalist tool for Menéndez's political campaign ahead of the 1950 general election. PAR finished behind the Revolutionary Party of Democratic Unification (PRUD), and Menéndez denounced the results as fraudulent. From 1950 to 1964, the old line faction controlled PAR and presented the leftist party as the primary opposition to PRUD. It boycotted several elections throughout the 1950s on the grounds of electoral fraud by the PRUD government. After the fall of PRUD and the rise of the National Conciliation Party (PCN), PAR was surpassed by the Christian Democratic Party (PDC) as the largest opposition party.

In 1964, the new line faction took control of PAR and shifted the party further to the left after being infiltrated by members of the banned Communist Party of El Salvador (PCES). The party was dissolved by the Central Electoral Council (CEC) months after the 1967 presidential election on the grounds that it was a communist party. The party was briefly revived during the 1980s and contested three elections but never won more than half a percent.

== History ==
=== Early years ===
Colonel José Asencio Menéndez established the Renovating Action Party in May 1944 following the Strike of Fallen Arms that overthrew Brigadier General Maximiliano Hernández Martínez, the president of El Salvador. From 1944 to 1950, PAR functioned as a personalist tool for Menéndez's political campaigns. PAR did not participate in the 1945 presidential election.

Menéndez was the party's presidential candidate during the 1950 general election. The party won 43.55 percent of the vote. Menéndez came in second place behind Lieutenant Colonel Óscar Osorio of the military-run Revolutionary Party of Democratic Unification (PRUD), and PAR won 14 out of 52 seats in the Legislative Assembly; PRUD won the remaining 38 seats. PAR rejected the election results. Menéndez authored a pamphlet claiming that he won the election and that Osorio had tampered with the ballot boxes to produce a result favorable to PRUD.

=== Old line ===
Beginning in 1950, Menéndez's influence within PAR began to diminish and the party came to be controlled by the "old line" faction. The party presented itself as the primary opposition force to PRUD. PAR boycotted the 1952 legislative election, claiming that the election was rigged in favor of PRUD. This led to PRUD winning every seat in the Legislative Assembly. PAR did not participate in the 1954, 1956, or 1958 legislative elections. PAR nominated Enrique Magaña Menéndez during the 1956 presidential election, but he boycotted the election after the Central Electoral Council (CEC) disqualified three other candidates. His name appeared on the ballot regardless and he finished in third place with 1.62 percent of the vote. Lieutenant Colonel José María Lemus of PRUD won the election.

PAR attempted to form a coalition named the National Opposition Union along with the April and May Revolutionary Party (PRAM), the National Action Party (PAN), and the Radical Democratic Party (PRD) ahead of the 1960 legislative election, but the coalition collapsed in six weeks due to disagreements between the parties. PAR won 12.27 percent of the vote but failed to win a single seat. It did, however, win the mayorships of La Libertad, Nueva San Salvador, San Salvador (the capital), and Santa Ana. That year, two PRUD legislators changed affiliation to PAR believing that it was the "party of the future".

The PRUD government was overthrown in October 1960 and replaced by the reformist Junta of Government. The junta was itself overthrown in January 1961 by military officers who feared that the Junta of Government was leading El Salvador towards communism. The Civic-Military Directory organized elections for a Constitutional Assembly to draft a new constitution. PAR contested the 1961 Constitutional Assembly election as a member of the Union of Democratic Parties along with the Christian Democratic Party (PDC) and the Social Democratic Party (PSD). The alliance won 18.78 percent of the vote but failed to win a seat. Opposition parties, including PAR, boycotted the 1962 presidential election, arguing that the result would not be democratic; Lieutenant Colonel Julio Adalberto Rivera of the National Conciliation Party (PCN) won the election unopposed.

=== New line ===
PAR won 6 seats in the 1964 legislative election, but it was surpassed by the PDC as the largest opposition force in El Salvador with 14 seats. Shortly after the PDC became larger than PAR, the old line was replaced by the new line, a faction that consisted of younger members—many of whom only recently joined the party—and held more left-wing positions. Many of these members were infiltrators from the Communist Party of El Salvador (PCES) as communist parties were illegal in El Salvador at the time. Julio Ernesto Contreras, a student at the University of El Salvador, was the party's new line secretary-general. In 1965, old line members of PAR split from the party and, together with disillusioned PCN members, founded the Salvadoran Popular Party (PPS). Another group of social democratic members split and founded the National Revolutionary Movement (MNR). PAR lost 2 seats in the 1966 legislative election, and many localities that voted for PAR voted for the PDC instead as it gained 1 seat.

PAR nominated Fabio Castillo Figueroa, a former member of the Junta of Government, as its presidential candidate in the 1967 election. Jesús Gómez Castro, a lawyer, was his running mate. Castillo's candidacy was promoted by the PCES as he was a leftist professor at the University of El Salvador. Ahead of the election on 1 February, the Office of the Attorney General issued a request to the Central Electoral Council to ban PAR on allegations of it inciting violence and spreading communist propaganda. State radio also refused to allow PAR to spread its messaging, and the Catholic bishop of San Vicente, Pedro Arnoldo Aparicio, threatened to excommunicate Catholics who campaigned for PAR. Castillo finished in third place with 14.43 percent of the vote; the PCN's Colonel Fidel Sánchez Hernández won the election. PAR received support from urban workers during the election.

On 12 May 1967, the CEC issued a ruling dissolving the PAR on the grounds that it "propose[d] and propagate[d] Marxist doctrines whose primary foundation is the class struggle" ("proponer y propagar doctrinas marxistas cuyo fundamento primordial lo constituye la lucha de clases". The statement officially labeled PAR as a communist party. In 1968, former socialist PAR members joined forces with some members of the PCES to found the National Democratic Union (UDN).

A revived iteration of PAR existed during the 1980s and contested the 1985 legislative, 1988 legislative, and 1989 presidential elections. The party won 0.3 percent and 0.5 in the 1985 and 1988 elections, respectively; its presidential candidate, Ricardo Molina, won 0.3 percent of the vote in 1989 and finished in seventh place.

== Ideology ==
The Renovating Action Party was a left-wing political party. PAR promoted democracy and opposed authoritarianism. Under Menéndez's leadership, the party's ideology consisted of classical liberalism, reformism, and laissez-faire economics. Under the old line, the party retained its reformist policy but also called for gradual change and social democracy.

After the new line gained control of PAR, its political positions moved further left to the point that the party was accused of having communist sympathies. PAR leaders denied the accusations, dismissing them as attempts by conservatives to discredit reformism. Under the new line, PAR called for greater government control over the economy, the restructuring of the armed forces hierarchy, and the implementation of widespread land reform. Some members also called for closer relations with the members of the Warsaw Pact.

== Electoral history ==
=== Presidential elections ===
Election	Candidate	Votes	%	Pos.	Result	Ref.
1945	Did not participate					
1950	José Asencio Menéndez	266,271	43.55%	▲2nd	Lost ✗	
1956	Enrique Magaña Menéndez	11,524	1.62%	▼3rd	Lost ✗	
1962	Boycotted					
1967	Fabio Castillo Figueroa	70,978	14.43%	3rd	Lost ✗	
Did not exist (1972 through 1984 elections)
1989	Ricardo Molina	5,059	0.54%	▼7th	Lost ✗	

=== Legislative Assembly elections ===
Election	Votes	%	Position	Seats	+/–	Status in legislature	Ref.
1950	266,271	43.55	▲2nd	14 / 52	New	Opposition	
1952	Boycotted			0 / 54	▼14	Extraparliamentary	
1954	Boycotted			0 / 54	0	Extraparliamentary	
1956	Boycotted			0 / 54	0	Extraparliamentary	
1958	Boycotted			0 / 54	0	Extraparliamentary	
1960	51,557	12.27	▲2nd	0 / 54	0	Extraparliamentary	
1961	64,916 (Note: As a member of the Union of Democratic Parties (UPD).)	18.78	2nd	0 / 54	0	Extraparliamentary	
1964	45,499	15.35	▼3rd	6 / 52	▲6	Opposition	
1966	26,661	6.89	3rd	4 / 52	▼2	Opposition	
Did not exist (1968 through 1982 elections)
1985	2,963	0.31	▼7th	0 / 60	0	Extraparliamentary	
1988	5,059	0.54	7th	0 / 60	0	Extraparliamentary	

== See also ==
- List of political parties in El Salvador
