= Manuel de Jesús Córdova =

Salvadoran military officer

General Manuel de Jesús Córdova
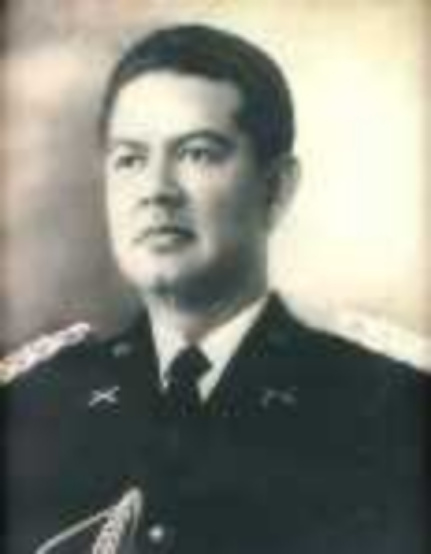
- Born: Manuel de Jesús Córdova Melgar; 25 December 1911; Chalatenango, El Salvador
- Education: Captain General Gerardo Barrios Military School
- Military career
- Allegiance: El Salvador
- Branch: Salvadoran Army
- Service years: 1930–?
- Rank: General
- Commands: National Guard
- Conflicts: 1931 Salvadoran coup d'état Palm Sunday Coup; Majors' Coup

Manuel de Jesús Córdova Melgar (25 December 1911 – ?) was a Salvadoran military officer who was a member of the Revolutionary Council of Government, a Salvadoran civic-military junta, from 1948 to 1949. He later served as the director of the Captain General Gerardo Barrios Military School from 1956 to 1958.

== Biography ==
Manuel de Jesús Córdova Melgar was born in Chalatenango, El Salvador on 25 December 1911. His parents were Luis Córdova and Delfina Melgar.

Córdova graduated from the Captain General Gerardo Barrios Military School on 20 November 1930 as a sub-lieutenant. He was promoted by lieutenant in 1931. He took part in that year's coup d'état against President Arturo Araujo. In 1944, Córdova became the director of the National Guard. Córdova opposed the April 1944 Palm Sunday Coup against General President Maximiliano Hernández Martínez, during which, the National Guard captured the Ilopango International Airport.

On 14 December 1948, junior military officers of the Armed Forces of El Salvador overthrew President General Salvador Castaneda Castro in the Majors' Coup. The coup leaders established the Revolutionary Council of Government (CGR), a civic-military junta, the consisted of Córdova, Major Óscar Osorio, Major Óscar Adán Bolaños, Reynaldo Galindo Pohl, and Humberto Costa. As a member of the CGR, Córdova oversaw the seizure of assets from Castaneda as former president Colonel Osmín Aguirre y Salinas. Córdova resigned from the CGR on 5 October 1949, after which, he became a military attaché to Argentina and later the United States.

From 1956 to 1958, Córdova served as the director of the Captain General Gerardo Barrios Military School. In 1958, he became the chief of the Joint Chiefs of Staff.

== Dates of ranks ==
The following is a list of Córdova's military ranks during his career.

Insignia	Rank	Service branch	Date of promotion
Sub-lieutenant	Sub-lieutenant	Army	20 November 1930
Lieutenant	Lieutenant	Army	1931
Captain	Captain	Army	?
Major captain	Major	Army	1943
Lieutenant colonel	Lieutenant colonel	Army	before 1948
Colonel	Colonel	Army	?
General	General	Army	before 1956

Military offices
Preceded by Col. Antonio Valdéz	Director of the Captain General; Gerardo Barrios Military School; 1956–1958	Succeeded by Col. Luis Roberto Flores
