= Captain General Gerardo Barrios Military School =

Former military school in El Salvador

Captain General Gerardo Barrios Military School Escuela Militar Capitán General Gerardo Barrios
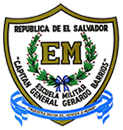

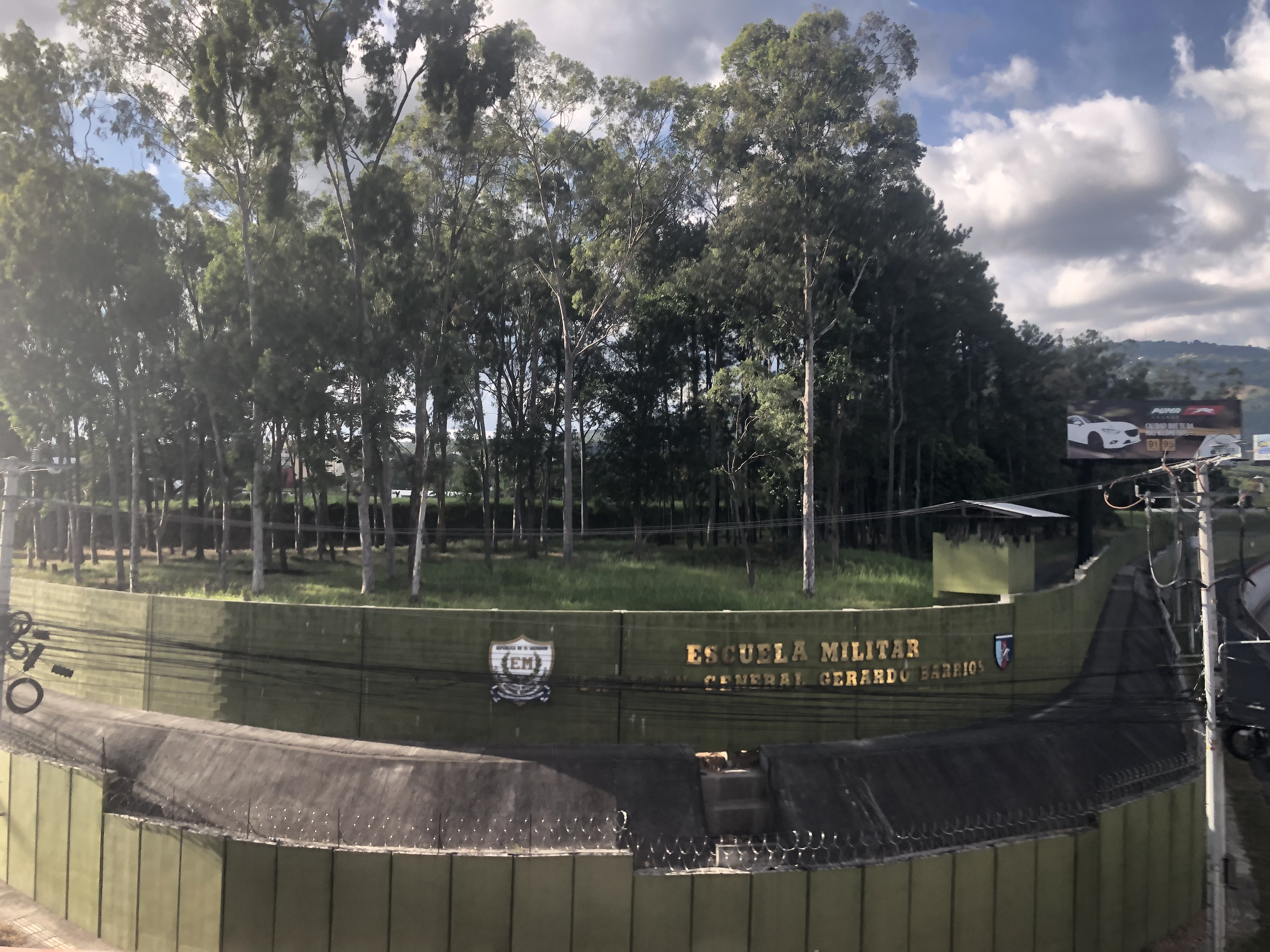
- The military school's exterior in 2021.

Location
- Antiguo Cuscatlán, Santa Tecla, El Salvador
- Coordinates: 13°40′56″N 89°15′12″W

Information
- School type: Military academy
- Motto: Nuestra Divisa Es, Vencer O Morir (Our Motto Is, Win or Die)
- Established: 21 February 1868; 157 years ago
- Founder: Francisco Dueñas
- Status: Demolished
- Closed: 8 June 2022; 3 years ago
- Gender: Coeducational
- Enrollment: 1,057 (2021)
- Affiliation: Armed Forces of El Salvador
- Website: escuelamilitar.mil.sv

The Captain General Gerardo Barrios Military School (Spanish: Escuela Militar Capitán General Gerardo Barrios), abbreviated as the EMCGGB, was a military academy in El Salvador. It was established in 1868 and is named after Captain General Gerardo Barrios who served as President of El Salvador from 1859 to 1863. It was located in Antiguo Cuscatlán, Santa Tecla, La Libertad. It was demolished in June 2022 to make way for the construction of the National Stadium of El Salvador.

== History ==
In 1867, a French military mission to El Salvador assisted President Francisco Dueñas in establishing a military academy for the country, which was opened on 21 February 1868 under the name Military College. The school was established in Antiguo Cuscatlán, Santa Tecla, La Libertad. Instructors at the military academy include military officers of Prussian, Chilean, American, and Salvadoran descent.

The name of the school was officially changed to the Captain General Gerardo Barrios Military School, after the President of El Salvador from 1859 to 1863, on 28 January 1927 by a presidential decree ordered by President Pío Romero Bosque. The name was again solidified by another presidential decree on 25 August 1965 by President General Julio Adalberto Rivera Carballo.A commemorative plaque was installed in 1982 that commemorated the class of 1936 which helped President General Maximiliano Hernández Martínez put down an indigenous and communist revolt in 1932. During the military dictatorship of 1931 to 1979, the school was referred to as the "School of the Presidents" since many presidents attended the military academy.

The school accepted more students than how many actually become military officers. Those who endured the exercises and practices of the school graduate and became officers. The first women began attending the school in 2000. On 30 November 2018, the Star of Captain General Gerardo Barrios was established and was awarded to military officers who graduate from the school. The school had a song called the "Himno de la EMCGGB" or "Hymn of the EMCGGB."

The Captain General Gerardo Barrios Military School was demolished in June 2022 to make way for the construction of the National Stadium of El Salvador.

== Notable alumni ==
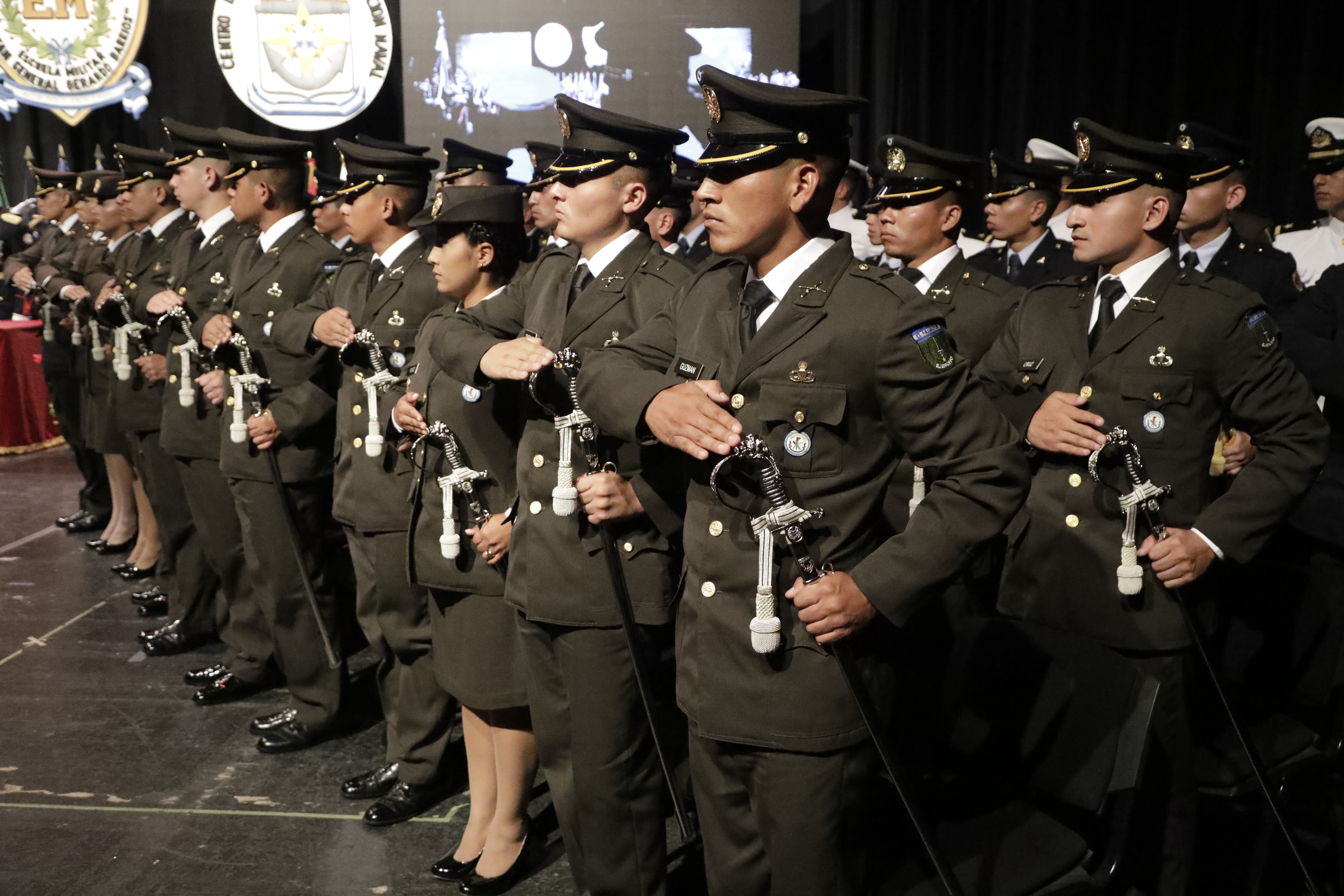
Graduate cadets in 2018.

=== Presidents of El Salvador ===
- Salvador Castaneda Castro (1888–1965) – President of El Salvador (1945–1948) and Director of the Gerardo Barrios Military School (1930–1931)
- Arturo Armando Molina (1927–2021) – President of El Salvador (1972–1977)
- Óscar Osorio (1910–1969) – President of El Salvador (1950–1956) and member of the Revolutionary Council of Government (1948–1950)
- Julio Adalberto Rivera Carballo (1921–1973) – President of El Salvador (1962–1967)
- Carlos Humberto Romero (1924–2017) – President of El Salvador (1977–1979) and Minister of National Defense (1972–1977)

=== Ministers of National Defense ===
- Rafael Humberto Larios López (born 1937), Minister of National Defense (1989–1990)
- Juan Antonio Martínez Varela (born 1952), Minister of National Defense (1999–2004)
- René Merino Monroy (born 1963) – Minister of National Defense (2019–present)
- David Munguía Payés (birth unknown), Minister of National Defense (2009–2011, 2013–2019)
- René Emilio Ponce (1947–2011) – Minister of National Defense (1990–1993)

=== Other military personnel ===
- Guillermo Alfredo Benavides (birth unknown) – Director of the Gerardo Barrios Military School (1989–1990) and ordered the 1989 murders of Jesuits
- Mauricio Arriaza Chicas (1964–2024) – Director of the National Civil Police (2019–2024)
- Roberto D'Aubuisson (1943–1992) – Death squad leader, President of the Legislative Assembly, 1984 presidential candidate for the Nationalist Republican Alliance
- Jaime Abdul Gutiérrez (1936–2012) – Chairman of (1980), Vice President of (1980–1982), and member of (1979–1982) the Revolutionary Government Junta
- Juan Francisco Emilio Mena Sandoval (unknown), Military officer who lead a mutiny during the Final Offensive of 1981
- Domingo Monterrosa (1940–1984) – Ordered the El Mozote massacre
- Luis Parada (born 1960) – member of the National Directorate of Intelligence and 2024 presidential candidate for Nuestro Tiempo

== Academy directors ==
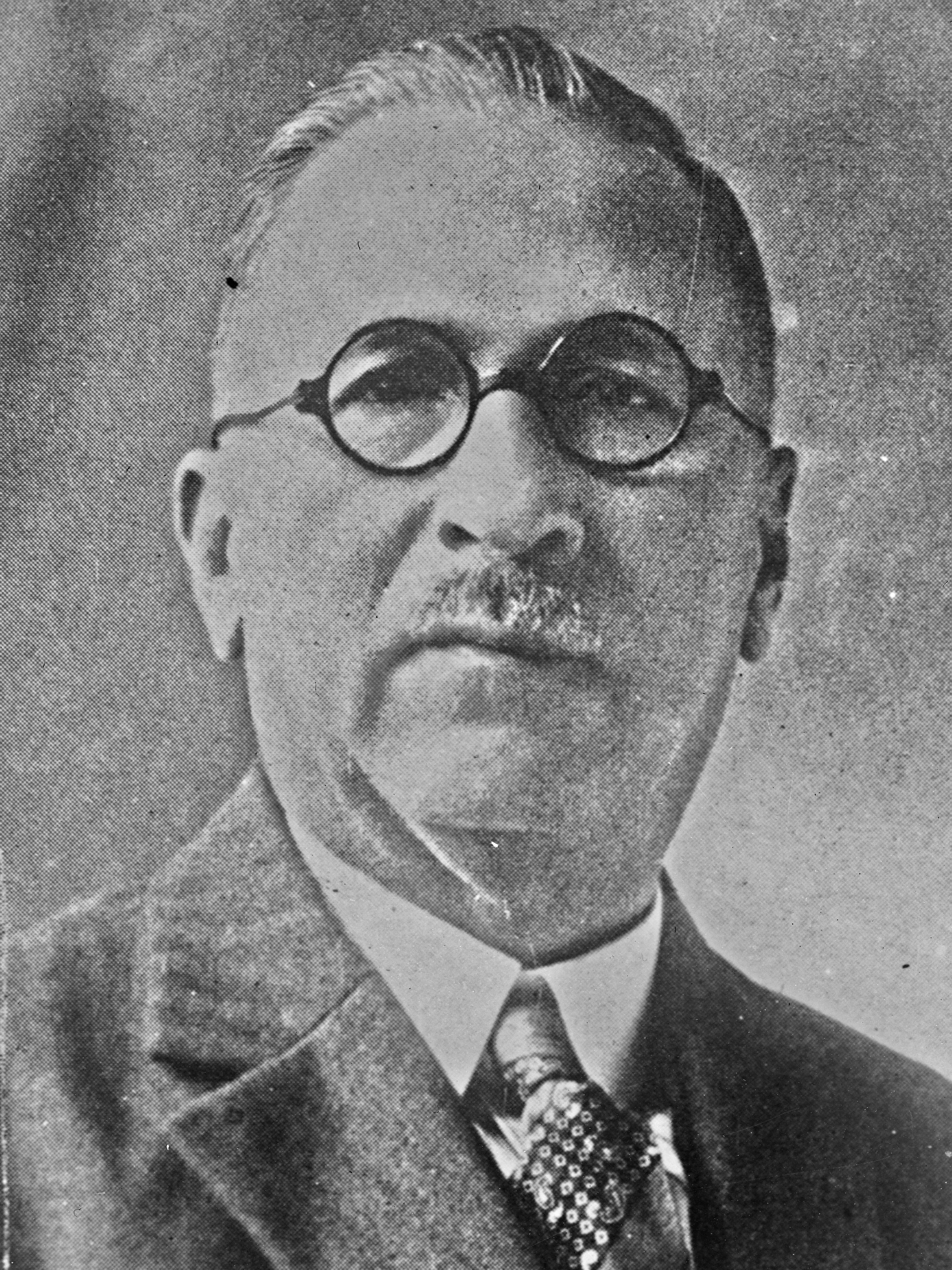
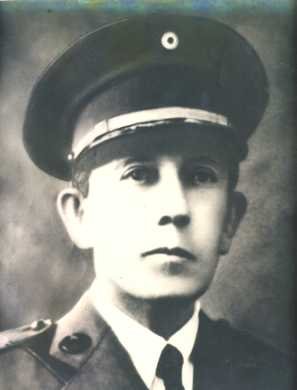
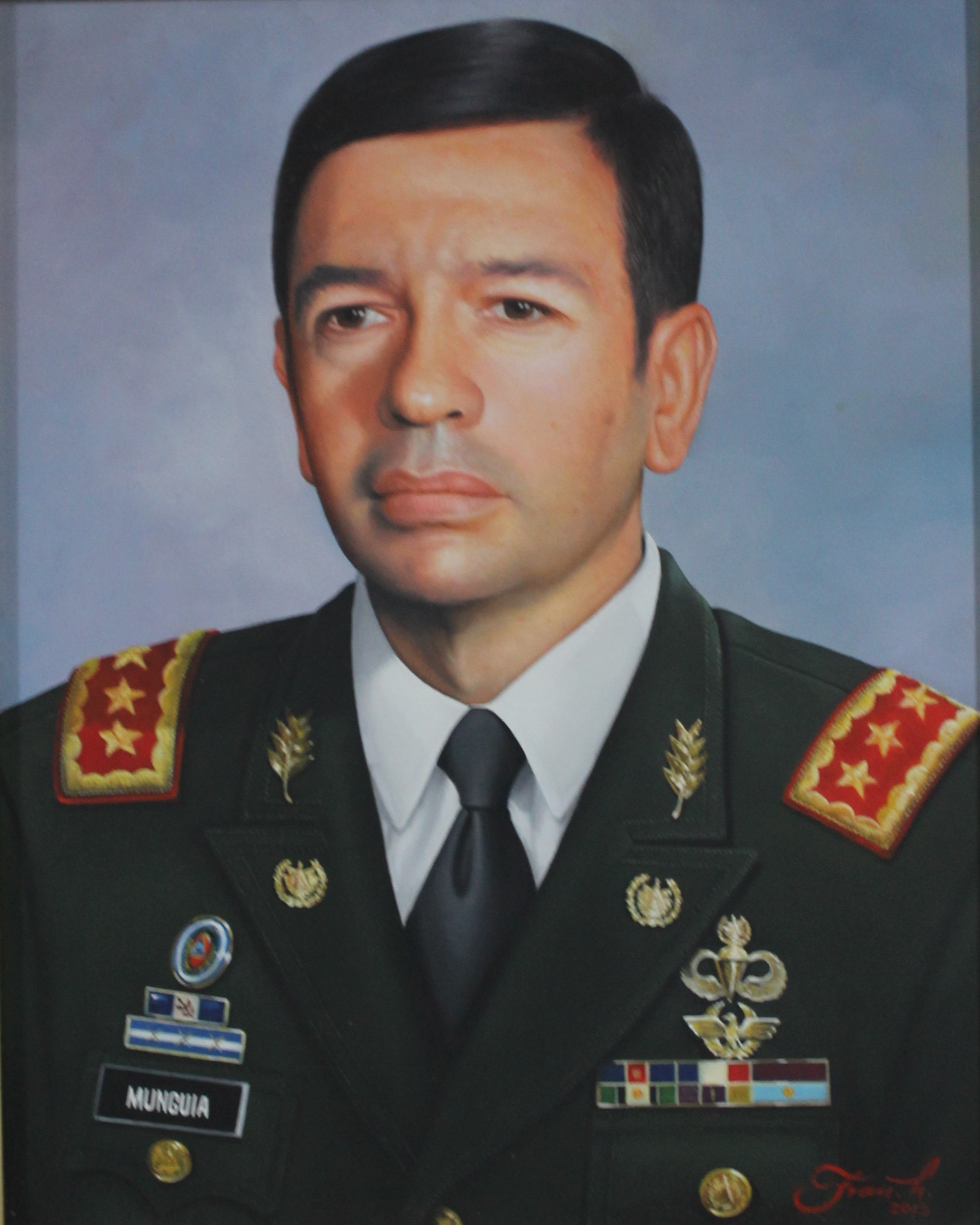
Bosque (left), Castaneda (center), Munguía (right).
- Dr. Pío Romero Bosque, 1927
- General Ramón González Suvillaga, 1927–1930
- General Salvador Castaneda Castro, 1930–1931
- Lieutenant Colonel José Avendaño, 1931–1932
- Colonel José Antonio Lorenzana, 1932–1937
- Colonel Alfonso Marroquín, 1937–1938
- General Eberhardt Bohnstedt, 1938–1939 (Germany)
- Colonel Zorobabel Galeno, 1939–1940 (Chile)
- Lieutenant Colonel Robert L. Christian, 1941–1943 (United States)
- Colonel Rufus A. Byers, 1943–1946 (United States)
- Colonel John F. Schmelzer, 1946–1948 (United States)
- Colonel Henry C. Learnar, 1948–1949 (United States)
- Colonel Ramón A. Nadal, 1949–1953 (United States)
- Colonel Luis Lovo Castelar, 1953
- Colonel Antonio Valdéz, 1953–1955
- General Manuel de Jesús Córdova, 1956–1958
- Colonel Luis Roberto Flores, 1958–1960
- Colonel Francisco José Mijango, 1960–1961
- Colonel Carlos Guzmán Aguilar, 1961
- Colonel Rafael Cruz Garrido, 1961
- Lieutenant Colonel Oscar Rank Altamirano, 1961
- Colonel Mauricio Rivas Rodríguez, 1962–1963
- Colonel Carlos Amaya, 1963–1964
- Colonel Carlos Infante Guerra, 1964–1967
- Lieutenant Colonel José Fernando Sigui Olivares, 1967–1969
- Colonel Juan Antonio Martínez Varela, 1969–1971
- Lieutenant Colonel Agustín Martinez Varela, 1971–1972
- Colonel Julio González Palomo, 1972–1973
- Colonel José Luis Ramón Rosales, 1973–1976
- Colonel Anibal Velarde Figueroa, 1976–1977
- Colonel José Antonio Corleto, 1978
- Colonel Sócrates Roberto Echegoyén, 1979
- Colonel Rafael Humberto Larios, 1980–1983
- Colonel Luis Adalberto Landaverde, 1983
- Colonel Ricardo Antonio Castellanos, 1985–1986
- Colonel Jesús Gabriel Contreras, 1986–1987
- Colonel Oscar Edgardo Casanova Vejar, 1987–1989
- Colonel Guillermo Alfredo Benavides, 1989–1990
- Colonel Ricardo A. Casanova Sandoval, 1990–1992
- Colonel Julio César Grijalva, 1992
- Colonel Nelson Ivan Saldaña Araujo, 1993
- Colonel Alvaro Antonio Calderón Hurtado, 1993–1995
- Colonel David Munguía Payés, 1996–1997
- Colonel Luis Mario Aguilar Alfaro, 1998–1999
- Colonel Simón Alberto Molina Montoya, 2000
- Colonel Luis Mario Aguilar Alfaro, 2000–2001
- Colonel Ricardo Benjamín Abrego Abrego, 2002
- Colonel José Luis Alvarado Guevara, 2002
- Colonel Willian Igdalí Moreno Segovia, 2003–2004
- Colonel Julio Armando García Oliva, 2004–2005
- Colonel Roberto Edmundo Rodriguez Abrego, 2006–2007
- Colonel Roberto Artiga Chicas, 2007–2008
- Colonel Walter Mauricio Arévalo Gavidia, 2009
- Colonel Francisco E. Del Cid Díaz, 2010
- Colonel Julio Héctor Hidalgo Martínez, 2010–2012
- Colonel Félix Edgardo Núñez Escobar, 2012–2013
- Colonel Walter Jacobo Lovato Villatoro, 2014
- Colonel Carlos Alberto Ramírez Hernández, 2014
- Colonel José Roberto Saleh Orellana, 2014–2017
- Colonel Mario Ernesto Argueta Vásquez, 2017–2019
- Colonel Roberto Ulises Santos Romero, 2019
- Colonel Franklin Bladimir Gavarrete Galdámez, 2019–2022

== Notable professors ==
- Maximiliano Hernández Martínez (1882–1966) – later President of El Salvador (1931–1934, 1935–1944)
- José Napoleón Duarte (1925–1990) – professor of mathematics, later President of El Salvador (1984–1989)
