= 1964 Salvadoran legislative election =

- 8 March 1964
- All 52 seats in the Legislative Assembly; 27 seats needed for a majority
Party	Leader	Vote %	Seats	+/–
PCN	Julio Rivera	58.57	32	−22
PDC		26.08	14	+14
Renovating Action		15.35	6	+6
This lists parties that won seats. See the complete results below.
Results by constituency
President of the Legislative Assembly before	President of the Legislative Assembly after
Francisco José Guerrero; PCN	Francisco José Guerrero; PCN

Legislative elections were held in El Salvador on 8 March 1964. The result was a victory for the National Conciliation Party, which won 32 of the 52 seats.

== Results ==
Party	Votes	%	Seats	+/–
National Conciliation Party	173,620	58.57	32	–22
Christian Democratic Party	77,315	26.08	14	+14
Renovating Action Party	45,499	15.35	6	+6
Total	296,434	100.00	52	–2
Registered voters/turnout	1,074,243	–		
Source: Krennerich 2005, p. 282

=== Results by department ===
The following table displays the number of votes and seats each political party received from each of the country's 14 departments. The party with the most votes in a department is highlighted in its party color and the party with the second most votes and seats in a department is in gray.

Department	PCN			PDC			PAR			Blank/invalid	Total
Department	V	%	S	V	%	S	V	%	S	V	V
Ahuachapán	10,405	77.3	2	2,495	18.5	1	566	4.2	0	–	13,466
Cabañas	7,947	77.1	2	1,683	16.3	0	674	6.6	0	–	10,304
Chalatenango	7,371	53.5	2	4,729	34.3	1	1,681	12.1	0	–	13,781
Cuscatlán	9,691	66.6	1	4,298	29.5	1	565	3.9	0	–	14,554
La Libertad	16,708	64.8	3	6,411	24.9	1	2,649	10.3	0	–	25,768
La Paz	8,205	63.2	2	2,594	20.0	1	2,174	16.8	0	–	12,973
La Unión	9,809	66.0	2	3,091	20.8	1	1,963	13.2	0	–	14,863
Morazán	8,050	56.5	2	3,853	27.1	1	2,338	16.4	0	–	14,241
San Miguel	15,094	66.3	3	5.083	22.3	1	2,588	11.4	1	–	22,765
San Salvador	28,765	37.9	3	29.267	38.5	4	17,915	23.6	2	–	75,947
San Vicente	4,873	53.8	1	4,183	46.2	1	—			–	9.056
Santa Ana	14,925	53.6	3	6,027	21.7	1	6,887	24.7	1	–	27,839
Sonsonate	10,961	73.6	3	1,205	8.1	0	2,733	18.3	1	–	14,899
Usulután	20,816	80.1	3	2,393	9.2	0	2,766	10.7	1	–	25,972
Total	173,620	58.57	32	77,315	26.08	14	45,499	15.35	6	–	1,074,243
Source: Wells 1967, p. 31

== Elected Members ==
Department	Deputy	Political affiliation
San Salvador	Guillermo Ungo	Christian Democratic Party
San Salvador	Julio Adolfo Rey Prendes	Christian Democratic Party
San Salvador	Pablo Mauricio Alvergue	Christian Democratic Party
San Salvador	Carlos Girón García	Christian Democratic Party
San Salvador	Francisco José Guerrero	National Conciliation Party
San Salvador	José Raúl Castro	National Conciliation Party
San Salvador	Julio César Hidalgo Villalta	National Conciliation Party
San Salvador	Salvador Miranda Galdámez	Renovating Action Party
San Salvador	Julio Ernesto Contreras	Renovating Action Party
Santa Ana	José León Paz	National Conciliation Party
Santa Ana	Carlos Mártir Sánchez	National Conciliation Party
Santa Ana	Mario Alejandro Miranda Canizáles	National Conciliation Party
Santa Ana	Francisco Delgado y Aguirre	Renovating Action Party
Santa Ana	Juan Ricardo Ramírez Rauda	Christian Democratic Party
Chalatenango	Julio César Tejada	National Conciliation Party
Chalatenango	Carlos Alberto Galdámez	National Conciliation Party
Chalatenango	Mario Alejandro Cubas	Christian Democratic Party
Sonsonate	Ricardo Orellana López	National Conciliation Party
Sonsonate	José Antonio Cienfuegos	National Conciliation Party
Sonsonate	Esteban Alonso Valencia	National Conciliation Party
Sonsonate	Mario Enrique Rodríguez Inclán	Renovating Action Party
Cuscatlán	Mario Humberto Claros	National Conciliation Party
Cuscatlán	Leonel Antonio Azucena	Christian Democratic Party
Ahuachapán	Julio Gochéz Calderón	National Conciliation Party
Ahuachapán	Miguel Ángel Ariz Lagos	National Conciliation Party
Ahuachapán	Adalberto Magaña Sansivirini	Christian Democratic Party
La Paz	José Agustín Martínez Rivera	National Conciliation Party
La Paz	Joaquín Cortéz	National Conciliation Party
La Paz	Miguel Antonio Zaldívar	Christian Democratic Party
La Libertad	José Francisco Guerrero	National Conciliation Party
La Libertad	Luis Martínez Urquilla	National Conciliation Party
La Libertad	José Martín García Ayala	National Conciliation Party
La Libertad	Eduardo Molina Olivares	Christian Democratic Party
Cabañas	José Adrián Barrera	National Conciliation Party
Cabañas	Miguel Apolonio Arévalo	National Conciliation Party
La Unión	Ricardo Antonio Cañas	National Conciliation Party
La Unión	Fernando Antonio Yánez	National Conciliation Party
La Unión	José Vidal Rubio	Christian Democratic Party
San Vicente	Vicente Amado Platero Peña	National Conciliation Party
San Vicente	Luis Eduardo Meléndez Flores	Christian Democratic Party
Morazán	José Ociel González	National Conciliation Party
Morazán	María del Carmen Martínez Villafañe de Calderón	National Conciliation Party
Morazán	Abel Salazar Rodezno	Christian Democratic Party
Usulután	Luciano Zacapa	National Conciliation Party
Usulután	Juan Alberto López Jiménez	National Conciliation Party
Usulután	Antonio Cestoni Gutiérrez	National Conciliation Party
Usulután	Rodolfo Ramírez Amaya	Renovating Action Party
San Miguel	Jesús Galileo Urrutia	National Conciliation Party
San Miguel	Juan Elías Fermán	National Conciliation Party
San Miguel	Carlos Urquilla Bernabel	National Conciliation Party
San Miguel	Víctor Manuel Mendoza Vaquedano	Christian Democratic Party
San Miguel	Óscar Humberto Quiroz	Renovating Action Party
