= 1961 Salvadoran Constitutional Assembly election =

- 17 December 1961
- All 54 seats in the Constitutional Assembly; 28 seats needed for a majority
Party	Leader	Vote %	Seats
PCN	Julio Rivera	60.10	54
This lists parties that won seats. See the complete results below.
Results by constituency
President of the Legislative Assembly before	President of the Legislative Assembly after
Víctor Manuel Esquivel Rodríguez; PRUD	Eusebio Rodolfo Cordón Cea; PCN

Constitutional Assembly elections were held in El Salvador on 17 December 1961. The result was a victory for the National Conciliation Party, which won all 54 seats.

== Results ==
Party	Votes	%	Seats
National Conciliation Party	207,701	60.10	54
Union of Democratic Parties (PAR–PDC–PSD)	64,916	18.78	0
National Action Party	49,300	14.27	0
Authentic Constitutional Party	23,665	6.85	0
Total	345,582	100.00	54
Registered voters/turnout	789,805	–	
Source: Nohlen

== Elected Members ==
Department	Deputy	Political affiliation
San Salvador	Eusebio Rodolfo Cordón Cea	National Conciliation Party
San Salvador	Francisco José Guerrero	National Conciliation Party
San Salvador	Salvador Ramírez Siliézar	National Conciliation Party
San Salvador	José Raúl Castro	National Conciliation Party
San Salvador	Augusto Ramírez Salazar	National Conciliation Party
San Salvador	Julio Hidalgo Villalta	National Conciliation Party
San Salvador	Héctor Alfredo Linares	National Conciliation Party
San Salvador	Francisco Murillo	National Conciliation Party
Santa Ana	Ernesto Mauricio Magaña	National Conciliation Party
Santa Ana	Juana Cáceres de Vides	National Conciliation Party
Santa Ana	Roberto Antonio Castellanos	National Conciliation Party
Santa Ana	David Posadas	National Conciliation Party
Santa Ana	José Pacas Casanova	National Conciliation Party
Santa Ana	Salvador Mendoza	National Conciliation Party
Chalatenango	Carlos Alberto Galdámez	National Conciliation Party
Chalatenango	Efraín López Bertrand	National Conciliation Party
Chalatenango	Julio César Tejada	National Conciliation Party
Sonsonate	Carlos Alfredo Martínez	National Conciliation Party
Sonsonate	Leopoldo Alberto Sandoval	National Conciliation Party
Sonsonate	Alejandro Morán López	National Conciliation Party
Cuscatlán	Jorge Humberto Alas	National Conciliation Party
Cuscatlán	Tomás Escamilla	National Conciliation Party
Cuscatlán	Juan Ramón Soler	National Conciliation Party
Ahuachapán	Julio Rosendo Castro	National Conciliation Party
Ahuachapán	Maximiliano Alberto Magaña	National Conciliation Party
Ahuachapán	Fabio Morán Calderón	National Conciliation Party
La Paz	Alfonso Cruz Palacios	National Conciliation Party
La Paz	Luis Enrique Zaldívar	National Conciliation Party
La Paz	José Vicente Gálvez	National Conciliation Party
La Libertad	Manuel Antonio Loucel Porras	National Conciliation Party
La Libertad	Miguel Ángel Molina	National Conciliation Party
La Libertad	Pablo Rubén Avelar	National Conciliation Party
La Libertad	Napoleón Quezada	National Conciliation Party
Cabañas	Benjamín Simó Leiva	National Conciliation Party
Cabañas	Arturo Marcos Fuentes López	National Conciliation Party
La Unión	José Manuel Pereira Paz	National Conciliation Party
La Unión	Gregorio Balmore Iraheta	National Conciliation Party
San Vicente	René Portillo Velasco	National Conciliation Party
San Vicente	José Antonio Durán	National Conciliation Party
San Vicente	Vicente Amado Platero	National Conciliation Party
Morazán	José Ociel González	National Conciliation Party
Morazán	Rogelio Arturo Quiroz	National Conciliation Party
Morazán	Héctor David Hernández	National Conciliation Party
Usulután	Narciso de Jesús Mejía	National Conciliation Party
Usulután	José Amadeo Cedillos	National Conciliation Party
Usulután	Armando Salinas Medina	National Conciliation Party
Usulután	Antonio Galdámez Morán	National Conciliation Party
Usulután	Rodolfo Jiménez Barrios	National Conciliation Party
San Miguel	Jesús Galileo Urrutia	National Conciliation Party
San Miguel	José Arístides Paz	National Conciliation Party
San Miguel	José Antonio Soto	National Conciliation Party
San Miguel	Juan Elías Fermán	National Conciliation Party
San Miguel	Felipe Francisco Umaña	National Conciliation Party

== Bibliography ==
- Political Handbook of the world, 1961. New York, 1962.
- Elections in the Americas : a data handbook/ ed. by Dieter Nohlen, Vol. 1. [Oxford] [u.a.] : Oxford Univ. Press, 2005.
- Anderson, Thomas P. 1971. Matanza: El Salvador's communist revolt of 1932. Lincoln: University of Nebraska Press.
- Institute for the Comparative Study of Political Systems. 1967. El Salvador election factbook, March 5, 1967. Washington: Institute for the Comparative Study of Political Systems.
- Kantor, Harry. 1969. Patterns of politics and political systems in Latin America. Chicago: Rand McNally & Company.
- McDonald, Ronald H. 1969. "Electoral behavior and political development in El Salvador." Journal of politics 31, 2:397-419 (May 1969).
- Montgomery, Tommie Sue. 1995. Revolution in El Salvador: from civil strife to civil peace. Boulder: Westview.
- Williams, Philip J. and Knut Walter. 1997. Militarization and demilitarization in El Salvador's transition to democracy. Pittsburgh: University of Pittsburgh Press.
