= 1966 Salvadoran legislative election =

- 13 March 1966
- All 52 seats in the Legislative Assembly; 27 seats needed for a majority
Party	Leader	Vote %	Seats	+/–
PCN	Julio Rivera	53.62	31	−1
PDC		31.16	15	+1
Renovating Action		6.89	4	−2
PREN		5.93	1	New
Popular		2.40	1	New
This lists parties that won seats. See the complete results below.
Results by constituency

Legislative elections were held in El Salvador on 13 March 1966. The result was a victory for the National Conciliation Party, which won 31 of the 52 seats.

== Results ==
Party	Votes	%	Seats	+/–
National Conciliation Party	207,586	53.62	31	–1
Christian Democratic Party	120,645	31.16	15	+1
Renovating Action Party	26,661	6.89	4	–2
National Evaluation Republican Party	22,960	5.93	1	New
Salvadoran Popular Party	9,303	2.40	1	New
Total	387,155	100.00	52	0
Registered voters/turnout	1,195,823	–		
Source: Krennerich 2005, p. 282

=== Results by department ===
The following table displays the number of votes and seats each political party received from each of the country's 14 departments. The party with the most votes in a department is highlighted in its party color and the party with the second most votes and seats in a department is in gray.

Department	PCN			PDC			PAR			PREN			PPS			Blank/invalid	Total
Department	V	%	S	V	%	S	V	%	S	V	%	S	V	%	S	V	V
Ahuachapán	10,593	65.4	3	1,758	10.8	0	1,114	6.9	0	399	2.5	0	2,339	14.4	1	–	16,203
Cabañas	8,071	73.0	2	986	8.9	0	158	1.4	0	1,821	16.5	0	26	0.2	0	–	11,062
Chalatenango	12,135	64.7	2	4,611	24.6	1	869	4.6	0	1,034	5.5	0	105	0.6	0	–	18,754
Cuscatlán	12,100	65.4	1	5,420	24.6	1	387	2.1	0	542	2.9	0	49	0.3	0	–	18,498
La Libertad	15,393	48.7	2	11,281	35.7	2	2,002	6.3	0	1,718	5.4	0	1,194	3.8	0	–	31,588
La Paz	7,689	52.7	2	6,058	41.5	1	—			852	5.8	0	—			–	14,599
La Unión	12,327	63.6	2	1,866	9.6	0	1,513	7.8	0	3,534	18.2	1	143	0.7	0	–	19,383
Morazán	11,288	63.6	2	5,013	30.4	1	—			201	1.3	0	—			–	16,511
San Miguel	18,663	64.9	2	4,668	16.2	1	3,894	13.6	1	1,522	5.3	0	—			–	28,747
San Salvador	32,861	31.2	3	58,579	55.5	5	7,944	7.5	1	4,855	4.6	0	1,257	1.2	0	–	105,496
San Vicente	8,723	66.0	1	3,955	29.9	1	—			241	1.8	0	300	2.3	0	–	13,219
Santa Ana	21,324	54.4	3	9,778	24.9	1	3,585	9.2	1	1,416	3.6	0	3,082	7.9	0	–	39,185
Sonsonate	15,084	66.6	3	3,773	16.6	1	1,266	5.9	0	1,839	8.1	0	692	3.1	0	–	22,654
Usulután	18,986	67.2	3	2,973	10.5	0	3,376	11.9	1	2,936	10.4	0	—			–	28,271
Total	207,586	53.62	31	120,645	31.16	15	26,661	6.89	4	22,960	5.93	1	9,303	2.40	1	–	387,155
Source: Wells 1967, p. 32
