= Margoth Muñoz de Burgos =

Salvadoran politician

Member of the Constituent Assembly
- In office 1961–1964

Personal details
- Died: 22 September 2017

Margoth Muñoz de Burgos (died 22 September 2017) was a Salvadoran politician. She was a member of the Constituent Assembly from 1961 to 1964.

Muñoz contested the 1961 elections for the Constituent Assembly and was elected to the Assembly. She served in the Assembly until 1964.
