= 1962 Salvadoran presidential election =

1962 elections in El Salvador

- 30 April 1962
	PCN
Nominee	Julio Adalberto Rivera Carballo
Party	PCN
Running mate	Francisco Roberto Lima
Popular vote	368,801
Percentage	100%
President before election
Eusebio Rodolfo Cordón Cea
Independent
Elected President
Julio Adalberto Rivera Carballo
PCN

Presidential elections were held in El Salvador on 30 April 1962. Julio Adalberto Rivera Carballo of the National Conciliation Party was the sole candidate, and was elected unopposed.

== Results ==
Candidate	Party	Votes	%
Julio Adalberto Rivera Carballo	National Conciliation Party	368,801	100.00
Total		368,801	100.00
Valid votes		368,801	92.17
Invalid/blank votes		31,317	7.83
Total votes		400,118	100.00
Source: Nohlen

== Bibliography ==
- Anderson, Thomas P. Matanza: El Salvador's communist revolt of 1932. Lincoln: University of Nebraska Press. 1971.
- Benítez Manaut, Raúl. "El Salvador: un equilibrio imperfecto entre los votos y las botas." Secuencia 17:71-92 (mayo-agosto de 1990).
- Eguizábal, Cristina. "El Salvador: elecciones sin democracia." Polemica (Costa Rica) 14/15:16-33 (marzo-junio 1984). 1984.
- Kantor, Harry. Patterns of politics and political systems in Latin America. Chicago: Rand McNally & Company. 1969.
- Political Handbook of the world, 1962. New York, 1963.
- Schooley, Helen. Conflict in Central America. Harlow: Longman. 1987.
- Williams, Philip J. and Knut Walter. Militarization and demilitarization in El Salvador's transition to democracy. Pittsburgh: University of Pittsburgh Press. 1997.
