= 1950 Salvadoran general election =

- Presidential election
- 26–29 March 1950
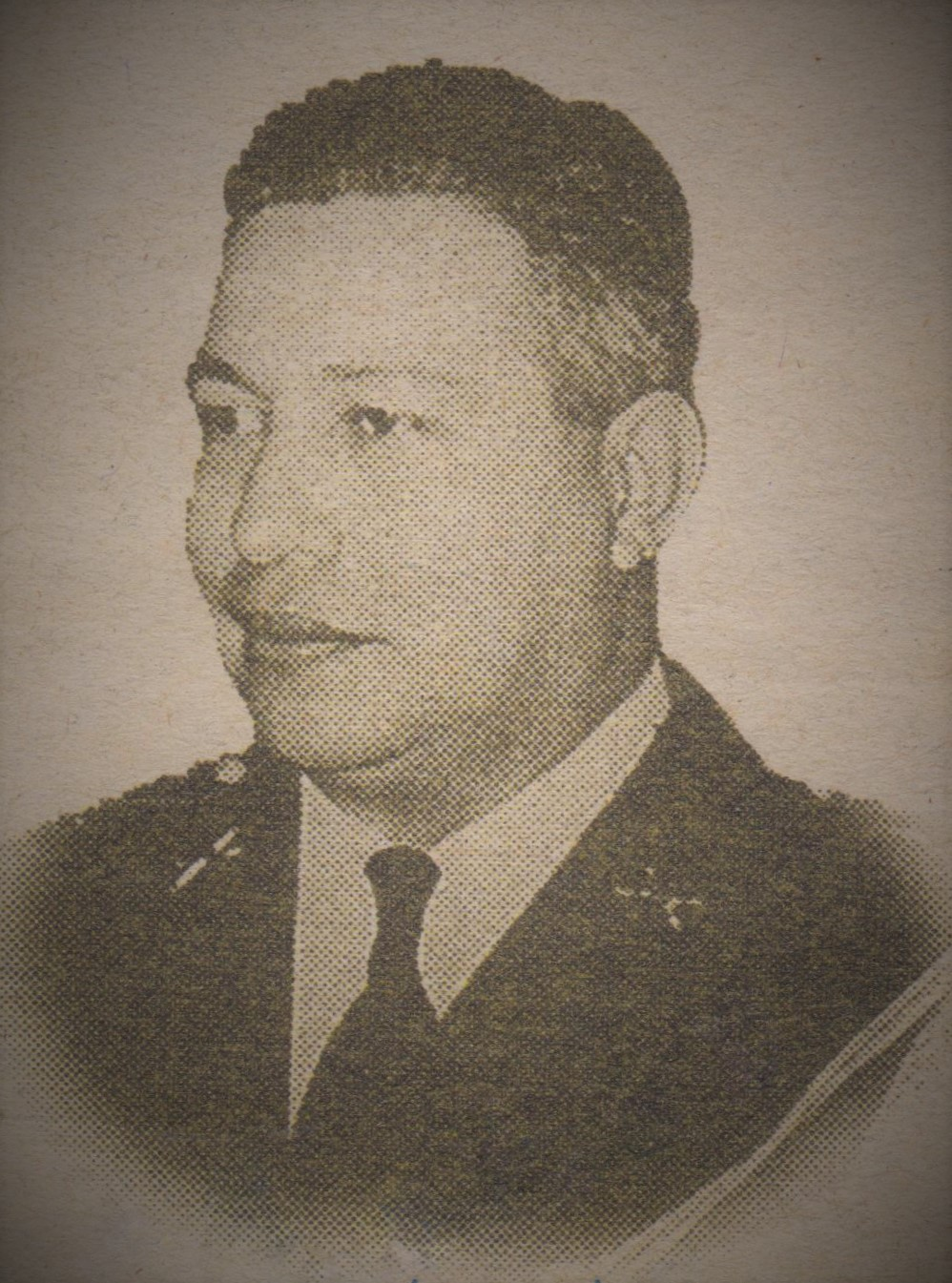
		PAR
Nominee	Óscar Osorio	José Asencio Menéndez
Party	PRUD	Renovating Action
Popular vote	345,139	266,271
Percentage	56.45%	43.55%
- Results by department
President before election
Revolutionary Council of Government
Elected President
Óscar Osorio
PRUD
- Legislative election
- All 52 seats in the Legislative Assembly; 27 seats needed for a majority
Party	Leader	Vote %	Seats
PRUD	Óscar Osorio	56.45	38
Renovating Action	José Asencio Menéndez	43.55	14
This lists parties that won seats. See the complete results below.
Results by constituency
President of the Legislative Assembly before	President of the Legislative Assembly after
Ricardo Rivas Vides; Social Democratic Unification Party	Reynaldo Galindo Pohl; PRUD

General elections were held in El Salvador between 26 and 29 March 1950. The result was a victory for Óscar Osorio in the presidential election, and his Revolutionary Party of Democratic Unification in the legislative election.

== Results ==
Party	Presidential candidate	Votes	%	Seats
Revolutionary Party of Democratic Unification	Óscar Osorio	345,139	56.45	38
Renovating Action Party	José Asencio Menéndez	266,271	43.55	14
Total		611,410	100.00	52
Valid votes		611,410	94.40	
Invalid/blank votes		36,256	5.60	
Total votes		647,666	100.00	
Source: Nohlen

== Elected Members ==
Department	Deputy	Political affiliation
San Salvador	Roberto Masferrer	Revolutionary Party of Democratic Unification
San Salvador	José María Peralta Salazar	Revolutionary Party of Democratic Unification
San Salvador	Mario Héctor Salazar	Revolutionary Party of Democratic Unification
San Salvador	José Arturo Antonio Castro	Revolutionary Party of Democratic Unification
San Salvador	Amílcar Zepeda	Revolutionary Party of Democratic Unification
San Salvador	Benjamín Wilfredo Navarrete	Revolutionary Party of Democratic Unification
San Salvador	Adolfo Rubio Melhado	Revolutionary Party of Democratic Unification
Santa Ana	Gustavo Enrique Álvarez	Renovating Action Party
Santa Ana	Vicente Rodríguez González	Renovating Action Party
Santa Ana	Arturo Morales Germán	Renovating Action Party
Santa Ana	Andrés Núñez	Renovating Action Party
Santa Ana	Emilio Sánchez González	Renovating Action Party
Chalatenango	Luis Amado Alas	Revolutionary Party of Democratic Unification
Chalatenango	Juan Miguel Ortiz	Revolutionary Party of Democratic Unification
Chalatenango	Jorge de Jesús Alvergue	Revolutionary Party of Democratic Unification
Sonsonate	Reynaldo Galindo Pohl	Revolutionary Party of Democratic Unification
Sonsonate	Tomás Calvo Marroquín	Revolutionary Party of Democratic Unification
Sonsonate	Benjamín Eladio Canjura	Revolutionary Party of Democratic Unification
Cuscatlán	Raúl Amaya	Revolutionary Party of Democratic Unification
Cuscatlán	Jesús Benedicto Antonio Cañas Prieto	Revolutionary Party of Democratic Unification
Cuscatlán	Pedro Pablo Moreno	Revolutionary Party of Democratic Unification
Ahuachapán	Obelio Velásquez	Renovating Action Party
Ahuachapán	Carlos Alberto Salazar	Renovating Action Party
Ahuachapán	Arturo Simeón Magaña	Renovating Action Party
La Paz	Carlos Octavio Tenorio	Renovating Action Party
La Paz	Victor Daniel Rubio	Renovating Action Party
La Paz	Carlos Armando Domínguez	Renovating Action Party
La Libertad	Manuel Romero Hernández	Revolutionary Party of Democratic Unification
La Libertad	Luis Mendoza	Revolutionary Party of Democratic Unification
La Libertad	José Alberto Viale Rodríguez	Revolutionary Party of Democratic Unification
La Libertad	Juan Castaneda Dueñas	Revolutionary Party of Democratic Unification
Cabañas	Constantino Hernández	Revolutionary Party of Democratic Unification
Cabañas	Gustavo Jiménez Marenco	Revolutionary Party of Democratic Unification
Cabañas	Manuel de Jesús Baires	Revolutionary Party of Democratic Unification
La Unión	Rodolfo Rubio Melhado	Renovating Action Party
La Unión	Mardoqueo Hernández	Renovating Action Party
La Unión	Francisco Ventura Zelaya	Renovating Action Party
San Vicente	Florentino Ruperto Romero	Revolutionary Party of Democratic Unification
San Vicente	Gilberto Aguirre	Revolutionary Party of Democratic Unification
San Vicente	Manuel Rafael Reyes	Revolutionary Party of Democratic Unification
Morazán	Manuel Laínez Rubio	Revolutionary Party of Democratic Unification
Morazán	Juan Inocente Molina Reyes	Revolutionary Party of Democratic Unification
Morazán	Silvano Antonio Sánchez	Revolutionary Party of Democratic Unification
Usulután	Adalberto Oscar de Jesús Rosales	Revolutionary Party of Democratic Unification
Usulután	Juan Víctor Boillat	Revolutionary Party of Democratic Unification
Usulután	Adrián Ortiz	Revolutionary Party of Democratic Unification
Usulután	José Antonio Munguía	Revolutionary Party of Democratic Unification
Usulután	Ramón Fermín Rendón	Revolutionary Party of Democratic Unification
San Miguel	Rafael Alfonso Cordero Rosales	Revolutionary Party of Democratic Unification
San Miguel	Colombo Rosales	Revolutionary Party of Democratic Unification
San Miguel	José Alberto Funes	Revolutionary Party of Democratic Unification
San Miguel	Manuel Atilio Guandique	Revolutionary Party of Democratic Unification
San Miguel	José Ernesto Benedetto	Revolutionary Party of Democratic Unification

== Bibliography ==
- Political Handbook of the world, 1950 New York, 1951
- Benítez Manaut, Raúl (1990) "El Salvador: un equilibrio imperfecto entre los votos y las botas" Secuencia 17:71-92
- Consejo Central de Elecciones (1951) Memoria de las elecciones de 1950 San Salvador: Secretaria de Información de la Presidencia de la Republica.
- Eguizábal, Cristina (1984) "El Salvador: elecciones sin democracia" Polemica 14/15:16-33
- Institute for the Comparative Study of Political Systems. 1967. El Salvador election factbook, March 5, 1967. Washington: Institute for the Comparative Study of Political Systems.
- Kantor, Harry (1969) Patterns of politics and political systems in Latin America Chicago: Rand McNally & Company
- Montgomery, Tommie Sue (1995) Revolution in El Salvador: From civil strife to civil peace Boulder: Westview
- Parker, Franklin D (1981) The Central American republics Westport: Greenwood Press
- Ruddle, Kenneth (1972) Latin American political statistics Supplement to the statistical abstract of Latin America. Los Angeles: Latin American Center, UCLA
- Webre, Stephen (1979) José Napoleón Duarte and the Christian Democratic Party in Salvadoran Politics 1960-1972 Baton Rouge: Louisiana State University Press
- Williams, Philip J. and Knut Walter (1997) Militarization and demilitarization in El Salvador's transition to democracy. Pittsburgh: University of Pittsburgh Press
