= Francisco Roberto Lima =

Salvadoran politician

Francisco Roberto Lima Rivera
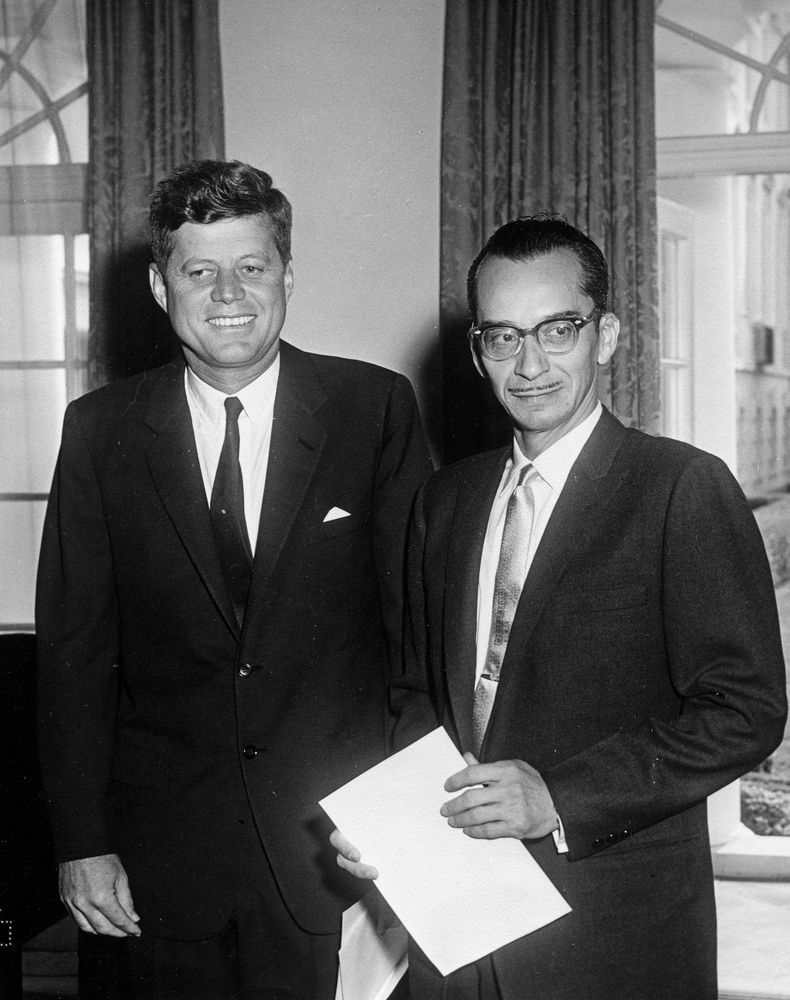
- Lima (right) in 1961

Vice President of El Salvador
- In office 1 July 1962 – 1 July 1967
- President: Julio Adalberto Rivera Carballo
- Preceded by: Francisco José Guerrero and Salvador Ramírez Siliézar
- Succeeded by: Humberto Guillermo Cuestas

Personal details
- Born: 13 February 1917 San Salvador, El Salvador
- Died: 2008 (aged 90–91)
- Party: National Conciliation Party
- Education: Lawyer

Francisco Roberto Lima Rivera (1917 – 2008) was a Salvadoran lawyer and politician who served as Vice President of El Salvador in the 1960s.

Lima was born on 13 February 1917, in San Salvador. He was a lawyer by profession. In 1948 he chaired a commission called National Social Security Planning Council.

Lima was appointed Salvadoran ambassador to United States in May 1961. He was elected as Vice President of El Salvador in the 1962 elections, and served in the presidency of colonel Julio Adalberto Rivera. In addition to vice presidency, he continued concurrently as ambassador to the United States until 1964, when he broke with president Rivera. He drafted an income tax law in 1964.

In 1990s Lima was a professor of constitutional and administrative law. He was the vice presidential candidate of FMLN–CD ticket in the 1994 presidential elections. He was threatened by a group called Fuerza Nacionalista Mayor Roberto D’Aubuisson in 1996.

In 2008, he was awarded a title of "Distinguished Jurist of El Salvador" by Legislative Assembly of El Salvador. He died soon after in the same year.
