= 1960 Salvadoran legislative election =

- 24 April 1960
- All 54 seats in the Legislative Assembly; 28 seats needed for a majority
Party	Leader	Vote %	Seats	+/–
PRUD	José Lemus	87.73	54	0
This lists parties that won seats. See the complete results below.
Results by constituency
President of the Legislative Assembly before	President of the Legislative Assembly after
Víctor Manuel Esquivel Rodríguez; PRUD	Víctor Manuel Esquivel Rodríguez; PRUD

Legislative elections were held in El Salvador on 24 April 1960. The result was a victory for the Revolutionary Party of Democratic Unification, which won all 54 seats after the Central Electoral Council had disqualified the candidates of the Renovating Action Party in seven of fourteen constituencies.

== Results ==
Party	Votes	%	Seats	+/–
Revolutionary Party of Democratic Unification	368,545	87.73	54	0
Renovating Action Party	51,557	12.27	0	New
Total	420,102	100.00	54	0
Source: Nohlen

== Elected Members ==
Department	Deputy	Political affiliation
San Salvador	Víctor Manuel Esquivel Rodríguez	Revolutionary Party of Democratic Unification
San Salvador	Edgardo Guerra Hinds	Revolutionary Party of Democratic Unification
San Salvador	Julio Suvillaga Zaldívar	Revolutionary Party of Democratic Unification
San Salvador	Carlos Zepeda	Revolutionary Party of Democratic Unification
San Salvador	Enrique González Castro	Revolutionary Party of Democratic Unification
San Salvador	José Ricardo Posada	Revolutionary Party of Democratic Unification
San Salvador	Héctor Fernández Padilla	Revolutionary Party of Democratic Unification
San Salvador	Santiago Hernández Alfaro	Revolutionary Party of Democratic Unification
Santa Ana	Jorge Hernández Colocho	Revolutionary Party of Democratic Unification
Santa Ana	Carlos Sandoval Martínez	Revolutionary Party of Democratic Unification
Santa Ana	Luis Cuestas	Revolutionary Party of Democratic Unification
Santa Ana	Abraham de Jesús Jovel Martínez	Revolutionary Party of Democratic Unification
Santa Ana	Miguel Alfredo Vides	Revolutionary Party of Democratic Unification
Santa Ana	Margarita Concepción Giammattei Sisniegas	Revolutionary Party of Democratic Unification
Chalatenango	Juan Antonio Moreira	Revolutionary Party of Democratic Unification
Chalatenango	Juan José Alvergue	Revolutionary Party of Democratic Unification
Chalatenango	Francisco Herbert Ayala	Revolutionary Party of Democratic Unification
Sonsonate	Sidney Mazzini Villacorta	Revolutionary Party of Democratic Unification
Sonsonate	Mauricio Eladio Castillo	Revolutionary Party of Democratic Unification
Sonsonate	Carlos Sandoval Langenegger	Revolutionary Party of Democratic Unification
Cuscatlán	Mariano Martínez Calderón	Revolutionary Party of Democratic Unification
Cuscatlán	Alfredo Timoteo Ferrufino	Revolutionary Party of Democratic Unification
Cuscatlán	Gabriel Arévalo Barahona	Revolutionary Party of Democratic Unification
Ahuachapán	Fernando García Prieto Nathan	Revolutionary Party of Democratic Unification
Ahuachapán	José Arriaza Alfaro	Revolutionary Party of Democratic Unification
Ahuachapán	Sergio Calderón Menéndez	Revolutionary Party of Democratic Unification
La Paz	Óscar René Salegio	Revolutionary Party of Democratic Unification
La Paz	Antonia Portillo de Galindo	Revolutionary Party of Democratic Unification
La Paz	José Holtenio Díaz	Revolutionary Party of Democratic Unification
La Libertad	Miguel Ángel Luna	Revolutionary Party of Democratic Unification
La Libertad	Mario Harrison Morales	Revolutionary Party of Democratic Unification
La Libertad	Joaquín Alfaro Brizuela	Revolutionary Party of Democratic Unification
La Libertad	Arturo Argumedo	Revolutionary Party of Democratic Unification
Cabañas	Gustavo Jiménez Marenco	Revolutionary Party of Democratic Unification
Cabañas	Carlos Cromeyer Mencía	Revolutionary Party of Democratic Unification
La Unión	Carlos González Ansaldo	Revolutionary Party of Democratic Unification
La Unión	Luis Alonso Sánchez	Revolutionary Party of Democratic Unification
La Unión	Roger Armando Castillo Galeas	Revolutionary Party of Democratic Unification
San Vicente	Jesús Méndez Barahona	Revolutionary Party of Democratic Unification
San Vicente	Gregorio Alfredo Funes	Revolutionary Party of Democratic Unification
San Vicente	Indalecio Miranda	Revolutionary Party of Democratic Unification
Morazán	Rogelio Ventura Álvarez	Revolutionary Party of Democratic Unification
Morazán	Armando Peña Quezada	Revolutionary Party of Democratic Unification
Morazán	Ciro Hildebrando Umaña	Revolutionary Party of Democratic Unification
Usulután	Belarmino Laguardia	Revolutionary Party of Democratic Unification
Usulután	José Ferreiro	Revolutionary Party of Democratic Unification
Usulután	Eugenio Denys	Revolutionary Party of Democratic Unification
Usulután	Luciano Zacapa	Revolutionary Party of Democratic Unification
Usulután	David Cierra Rodríguez	Revolutionary Party of Democratic Unification
San Miguel	Oscar Lacayo Rosales	Revolutionary Party of Democratic Unification
San Miguel	René Funes Aguirre	Revolutionary Party of Democratic Unification
San Miguel	Pedro Urquilla Espínola	Revolutionary Party of Democratic Unification
San Miguel	Carlos Alberto Blanco	Revolutionary Party of Democratic Unification
San Miguel	Jacinto Octavio Duarte	Revolutionary Party of Democratic Unification

== Bibliography ==
- Political Handbook of the world, 1960. New York, 1961.
- Benítez Manaut, Raúl. 1990. "El Salvador: un equilibrio imperfecto entre los votos y las botas." Secuencia 17:71-92 (mayo-agosto de 1990).
- Eguizábal, Cristina. 1984. "El Salvador: elecciones sin democracia." Polemica (Costa Rica) 14/15:16-33 (marzo-junio 1984).
- Institute for the Comparative Study of Political Systems. 1967. El Salvador election factbook, March 5, 1967. Washington: Institute for the Comparative Study of Political Systems.
- Kantor, Harry. 1969. Patterns of politics and political systems in Latin America. Chicago: Rand McNally & Company.
- Ruddle, Kenneth. 1972. Latin American political statistics. supplement to the statistical abstract of Latin America. Los Angeles: Latin American Center, UCLA.
- Webre, Stephen. 1979. José Napoleón Duarte and the Christian Democratic Party in Salvadoran Politics 1960-1972. Baton Rouge: Louisiana State University Press.
- Williams, Philip J. and Knut Walter. 1997. Militarization and demilitarization in El Salvador's transition to democracy. Pittsburgh: University of Pittsburgh Press.
