= National Action Party (El Salvador) =

The National Action Party (Spanish: Partido Acción Nacional) is a political party in El Salvador. It first contested national elections in 1956. However, Roberto Edmundo Cannessa, its candidate in the presidential election was disqualified, whilst in the legislative elections it failed to win a seat, despite being the only party to run against the Revolutionary Party of Democratic Unification. One of the party's known candidate in this legislative election was Concepción Nolasco, a female writer running in Morazán Department. Later, the party nominated Víctor Manuel Chicas instead and had Nolasco run for alternative deputy.

It did not contest the 1958 elections, but returned in 1960, again failing to win a seat against the PRUD. It also failed to win a seat in the Constitutional Assembly elections in 1961.

The party did not contest another election until 2000, when it won two seats in the legislative elections that year. However, it lost them both in the 2003 elections.
