= 1956 Salvadoran presidential election =

1956 elections in El Salvador

- 4 March 1956
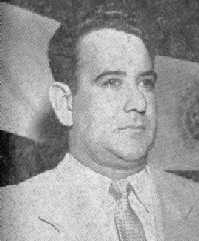

			PAR
Nominee	José María Lemus	Rafael Carranza Anaya	Enrique Magaña Menénendez
Party	PRUD	PCA	Renovating Action
Popular vote	677,748	22,659	11,524
Percentage	95.20%	3.18%	1.62%
President before election
Óscar Osorio
DPNU
Elected President
José María Lemus
DPNU

Presidential elections were held in El Salvador on 4 March 1956. The result was a victory for José María Lemus of the Revolutionary Party of Democratic Unification, who received 95.2% of the vote.

The Central Electoral Council had disqualified the candidacies of José Alberto Funes (Democratic Institutional Party), Roberto Edmundo Cannessa (National Action Party) and José Alvaro Díaz (Nationalist Democratic Party). It also forbade Rafael Carranza Anaya (Authentic Constitutional Party) and Enrique Magaña Menéndez (Renovating Action Party) from withdrawing their candidacies; nevertheless, the latter two boycotted the elections.

== Results ==
Candidate	Party	Votes	%
José María Lemus	Revolutionary Party of Democratic Unification	677,748	95.20
Rafael Carranza Anaya	Authentic Constitutional Party	22,659	3.18
Enrique Magaña Menéndez	Renovating Action Party	11,524	1.62
Total		711,931	100.00
Source: Nohlen

== Bibliography ==
- Benítez Manaut, Raúl. "El Salvador: un equilibrio imperfecto entre los votos y las botas." Secuencia 17:71-92 (mayo-agosto de 1990).
- Kantor, Harry. Patterns of politics and political systems in Latin America. Chicago: Rand McNally & Company. 1969.
- McDonald, Ronald H. "Electoral behavior and political development in El Salvador." Journal of politics 31, 2:397-419 (May 1969). 1969.
- Parker, Franklin D. The Central American republics. Westport: Greenwood Press. Reprint of 1971 edition. 1981.
- Political Handbook of the world, 1956. New York, 1957.
- Ruddle, Kenneth. Latin American political statistics. supplement to the statistical abstract of Latin America. Los Angeles: Latin American Center, UCLA. 1972.
- Webre, Stephen. José Napoleón Duarte and the Christian Democratic Party in Salvadoran Politics 1960-1972. Baton Rouge: Louisiana State University Press. 1979.
- White, Alastair. El Salvador. New York: Praeger Publishers. 1973.
- Williams, Philip J. and Knut Walter. Militarization and demilitarization in El Salvador's transition to democracy. Pittsburgh: University of Pittsburgh Press. 1997.
