= Francisco José Guerrero =

Salvadoran politician

Vice President of El Salvador
- In office 25 January 1962 – 1 July 1962
- President: Eusebio Rodolfo Cordón Cea
- Preceded by: Humberto Costa
- Succeeded by: Francisco Roberto Lima

President of the Legislative Assembly of El Salvador
- In office 1 July 1962 – 1968
- Preceded by: Eusebio Rodolfo Cordón Cea
- Succeeded by: Juan Gregorio Guardado

Personal details
- Born: Francisco José Guerrero Cienfuegos; 14 May 1925 San Salvador, El Salvador
- Died: 28 November 1989 (aged 64) San Salvador, El Salvador
- Manner of death: Assassination
- Party: National Conciliation Party
- Education: Lawyer

Francisco José Guerrero Cienfuegos (14 May 1925 – 28 November 1989) was a Salvadoran politician and lawyer who served as Vice President of El Salvador and President of the Legislative Assembly. He had a leadership position in National Conciliation Party (PCN).

Guerrero was born on 14 May 1925 in San Salvador. He graduated from the faculty of jurisprudence and social sciences of the University of El Salvador in December 1953. He worked as a lawyer.

Guerrero was a founding member of the National Conciliation Party, of which he was secretary general from December 1962 to October 1967. In 1962, he acted as vice president of the Constituent Assembly. He was Vice President of El Salvador in the provisional government of Eusebio Rodolfo Cordón Cea from January 1962 to July 1962.

Guerrero was President of the Legislative Assembly of El Salvador from 1962 to 1968. He was appointed as Minister of Foreign Affairs in 1967 and served until 1972. Years later, he was appointed as the president of the Supreme Court of Justice.

Guerrero was minister in the presidency in the cabinet of Álvaro Magaña in 1982. He was the presidential candidate for the PCN for the 1984 elections. On 28 November 1989 he was shot down by a guerrilla while he was driving his vehicle in San Salvador.
