= Humberto Costa (Salvadoran politician) =

Salvadoran politician

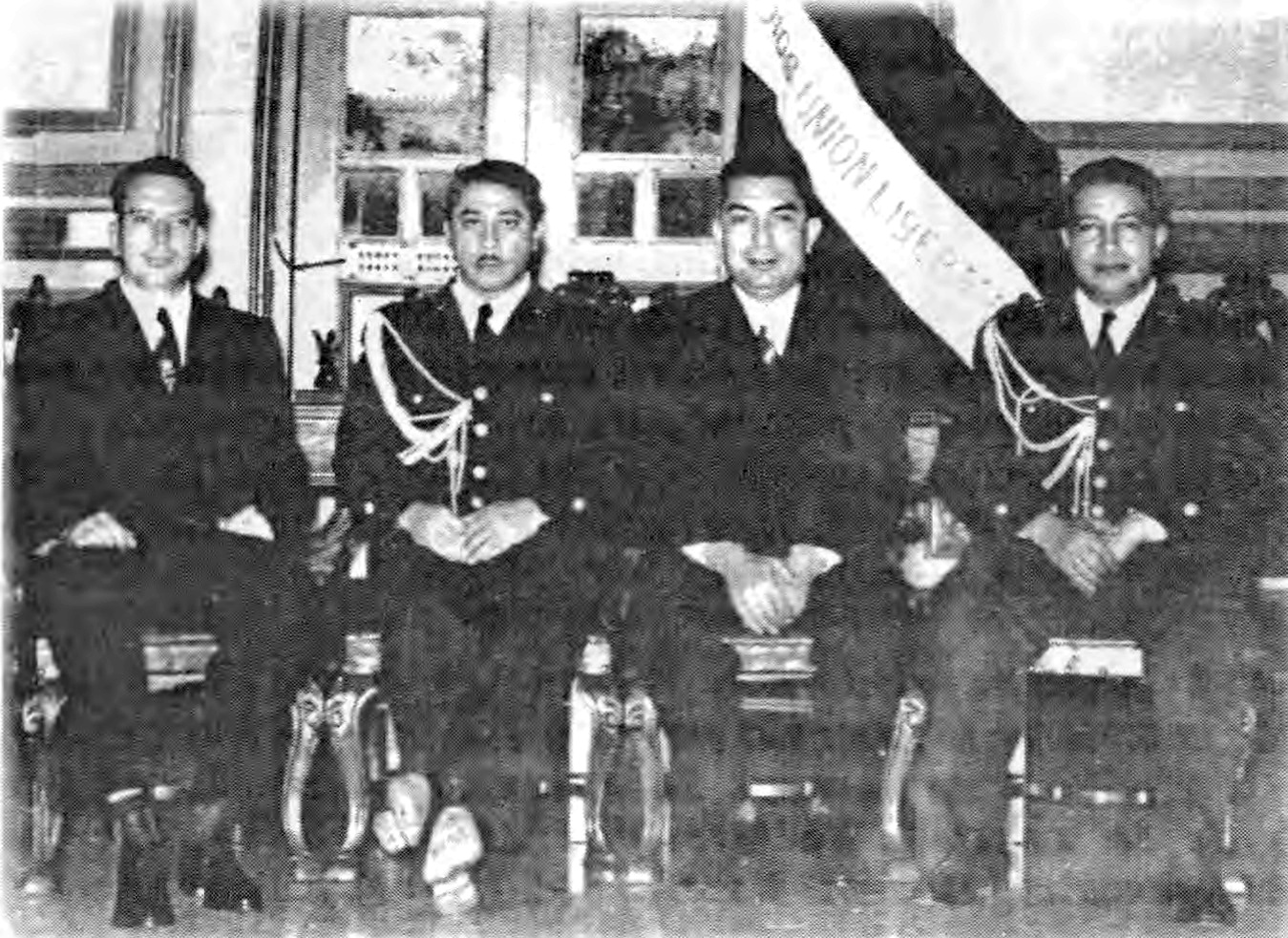
- Costa in 1948, third from left

Vice President of El Salvador
- In office 14 September 1956 – 26 October 1960
- President: José María Lemus
- Preceded by: José María Peralta Salazar
- Succeeded by: Francisco José Guerrero

Minister of Finance
- In office 1956–1959

Personal details
- Born: 2 September 1906 Santa Ana, El Salvador
- Party: Revolutionary Party of Democratic Unification

Humberto Costa (born 2 September 1906) was a Salvadoran politician who was Vice President of El Salvador during the presidency of José María Lemus. He is a doctor by profession.

Costa was born on 2 September 1906 in Santa Ana. He was a civilian member in the ruling military junta which governed El Salvador from 14 December 1948 to 14 September 1950. He was then appointed as the president of the Supreme Court of El Salvador, and he held that position until the 1956 elections.

Costa was elected Vice President of El Salvador as the running mate of José María Lemus in the elections of 1956 under the banner of PRUD. He was acting President of El Salvador during the absence of President Lemus from 9 March to 31 March 1959. He was also Minister of Finance from 1956 to 1959. The government was overthrown in the 1960 coup d'état, and Costa decided to retire from politics and devoted himself to his profession.
