= Eusebio Rodolfo Cordón Cea =

President of El Salvador in 1962

Doctor Eusebio Rodolfo Cordón Cea
- Cordón in 1962

Provisional President of El Salvador
- In office 25 January 1962 – 1 July 1962
- Vice President: Francisco José Guerrero; Salvador Ramírez Siliezar
- Preceded by: Civic-Military Directory; José María Lemus as President
- Succeeded by: Julio Adalberto Rivera Carballo

158th President of the Legislative Assembly of El Salvador
- In office 3 January 1962 – 1 May 1964
- Preceded by: Víctor Manuel Esquivel Rodríguez
- Succeeded by: Francisco José Guerrero

Personal details
- Born: 16 December 1899 Sonsonate, El Salvador
- Died: 9 January 1966 (aged 66) Mejicanos, El Salvador
- Occupation: Politician

Eusebio Rodolfo Cordón Cea (16 December 1899 – 9 January 1966) was provisional president of El Salvador between 25 January and 1 July 1962.

He served as the President of the Legislative Assembly of El Salvador in 1962.
