= Óscar Osorio =

President of El Salvador from 1950 to 1956

Lieutenant Colonel Óscar Osorio
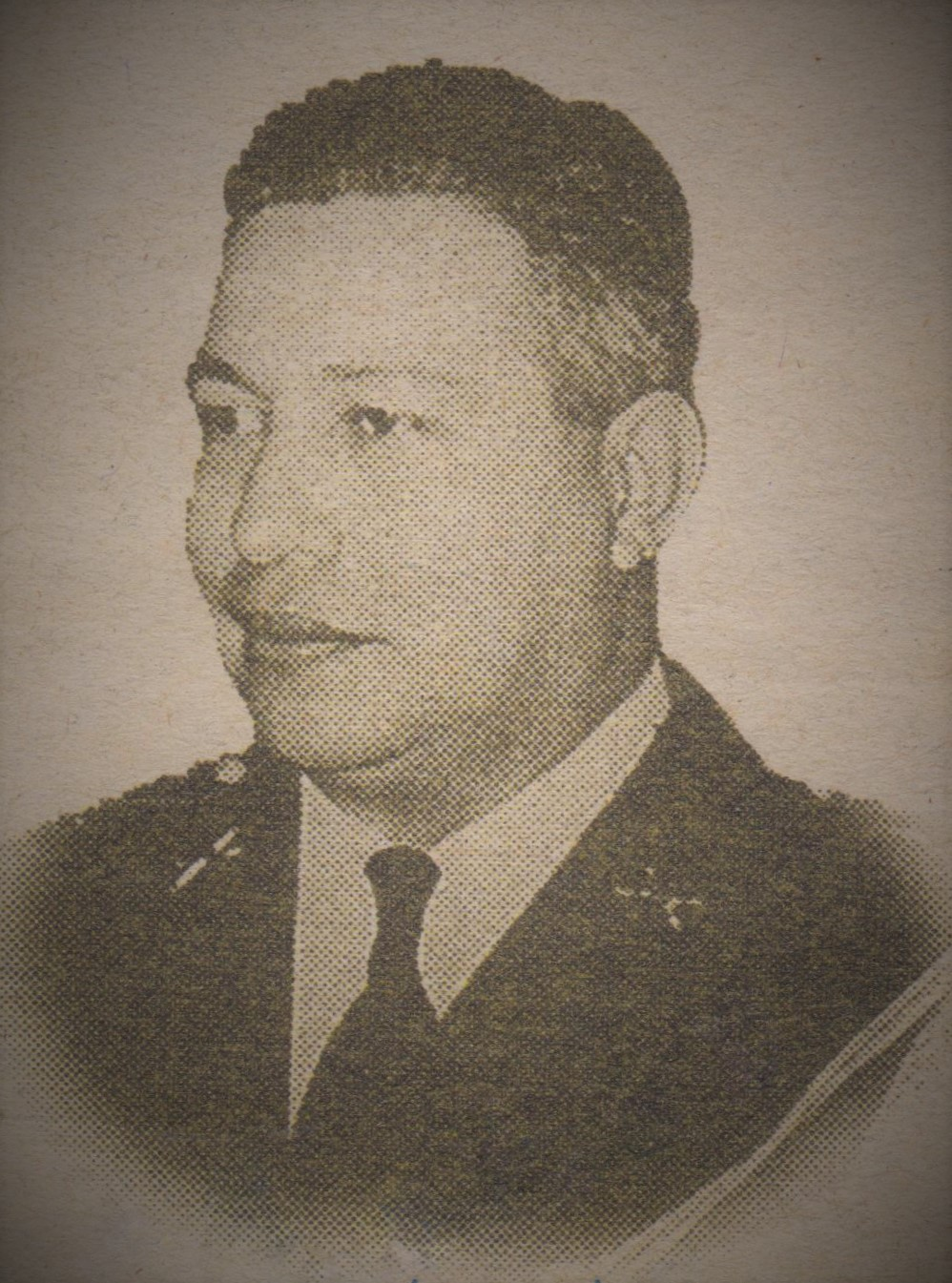
- Osorio, c. 1950–1956

29th President of El Salvador
- In office 14 September 1950 – 14 September 1956
- Preceded by: Revolutionary Council of Government; Salvador Castaneda Castro as President
- Succeeded by: José María Lemus

Personal details
- Born: 14 December 1910 Sonsonate, El Salvador
- Died: 6 March 1969 (aged 58) Houston, Texas, United States
- Party: Revolutionary Party of Democratic Unification
- Spouse: Esperanza Llerena
- Occupation: Military officer, politician

Military service
- Allegiance: El Salvador
- Branch/service: Salvadoran Army
- Rank: Lieutenant colonel

Óscar Osorio Hernández (14 December 1910 – 6 March 1969) ruled as a member of the Revolutionary Council of Government from 14 December 1948 to 14 September 1950. He served as the 29th President of El Salvador from 14 September 1950 until 14 September 1956.

== Biography ==
Osorio was born in the town of Sonsonate, El Salvador, on December 14, 1910.

He married twice: first with Leticia Rosales, with whom she had three children: Ana Maya, Rhina and Oscar. His second wife was Esperanza Llerena and had two children, Cecilia and Humberto.

His primary education was made in Sonsonate, Santa Ana and San Salvador, and worked in the Captain General Gerardo Barrios Military School in the capital.

He did his higher education in various national and foreign academies, but mostly 3 years in the War College in Turin, Italy, where he returned to the country in October 1943.

On 14 December 1948, there was a coup d'état of the "young soldiers" against President Salvador Castaneda Castro. Osorio, in the end with the rank of major, was added as a diplomatic mission in El Salvador in Mexico, and was called to lead the provisional government called the Revolutionary Council government, formed by Major Oscar Bolaños and civilians Reynaldo Galindo Pohl and Humberto Costa.

Under the new constitution of 1950 the presidential elections were held. In the elections of that year, he presented himself as a candidate of the Revolutionary Party of Democratic Unification, founded in 1945 and beat the only opposition candidate, Colonel José Menéndez Ascencio, who was presented by the Action Party Renovadora.

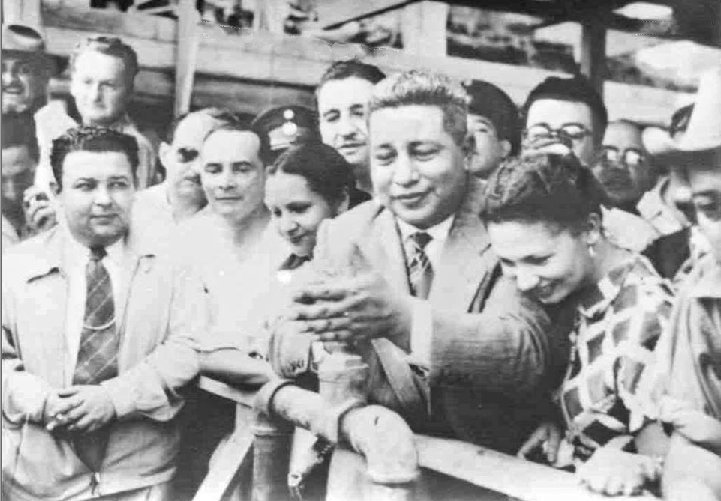
Oscar Osorio President of El Salvador in 1950 with his wife Esperanza Llerena

He assumed the constitutional presidency of El Salvador in 1950 and Osorio's government coincided with a period of calm because the coffee and cotton prices rose considerably. His presidency had adopted a plan of social reforms including the introduction of Social Security for urban workers and the creation of the Institute of Urban Housing (IVU) and developmental measures (pulse limited industrialization). With what he perceived the state in taxes on exports of coffee were initiated numerous public works, particularly the establishment of the Executive Committee on Ports, ECA, the construction of the Hydroelectric Dam "November 5, and the Coastal Highway the "Golden Bridge" on the Lempa River, numerous schools and multifamily housing complexes. It was also celebrated with great pomp the anniversary of the coup d'état of December 14 (officially known as the Revolution of 1948).These economic reforms largely helped the middle class and urban residents.

There was also a strong impetus to the arts, and he established a scholarship scheme for artists to study abroad.

At the same time, however, together with the democratic opening, Osorio created rules that put the country under a suspension of individual rights and collective, known as the Law on Defense of the Constitutional Order. Based on it, from 1952 until the end of his term, Osorio had developed a policy of selective repression against labor leaders and students, before the rise of the popular movement that emerged from the struggles that led to the overthrow of General Maximiliano Hernández Martínez in 1944. Osorio passed as political disappearances the imprisonment of the most important leaders of the Salvadoran left—labor leaders Salvador Cayetano Carpio and his wife Tula Alvarenga, the student leader Gabriel Gallegos Valdés and academic Celestino Castro. All were interrogated and tortured by the National Police, as documented in his book Abduction and Hood, first published in 1956.

The features of the government Osorio called Revolution 48 were:

His continued representation as of 1932 as the government of the oligarchy and imperialism.

With the rising price of coffee, there was a boom in the country.

In tandem with the high rhetoric, the government of Colonel Osorio accentuated the line of repression and terror against the democratic movement organized in the country. After splitting the labor movement and supporting a central reactionary movement with the full support of the state machinery, the Osores-led government acted against the organization of the working class in El Salvador in an attempt to repress it, albeit less intensely than in 1932.

At the time of Osorio, people began growing cotton on a large scale in the plains of the coast, especially in the east.

Another important fact is the Central American economic integration treaties signed in 1951.

Osorio died in Methodist Hospital in Houston, Texas, United States, as a result of kidney failure complicated by pneumonia.

== Dates of ranks ==
The following is a list of Osorio's military ranks during his career.

Insignia	Rank	Service branch	Date of promotion
Sub-lieutenant	Sub-lieutenant	Army	12 December 1931
Lieutenant	Lieutenant	Army	15 June 1934
Captain	Captain	Army	15 October 1937
Major captain	Major captain	Army	?
Lieutenant colonel	Lieutenant colonel	Army	9 September 1950

== Decorations ==
- Collar of the Order of the Aztec Eagle (Mexico, July 1951)
- Grand Cross of the Order of Bernardo O'Higgins (Chile, October 1951)
- Grand Cross of the Order of Rubén Darío (Nicaragua, January 1952)
- Extraordinary Grand Cross of the Order of Vasco Núñez de Balboa (Panama, September 1952)
- Grand Cross of the National Order of Merit (Ecuador, May 1953)
- Grand Cross Special Class of the Order of Merit of the Federal Republic of Germany (Germany, December 1954)
- Grand Cross with Collar of the Order of Merit of the Italian Republic (Italy, February 1955)
