= 1945 Salvadoran presidential election =

1945 elections in El Salvador

- 14–16 January 1945
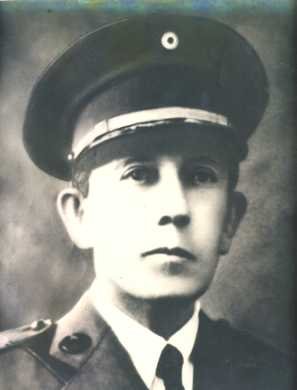

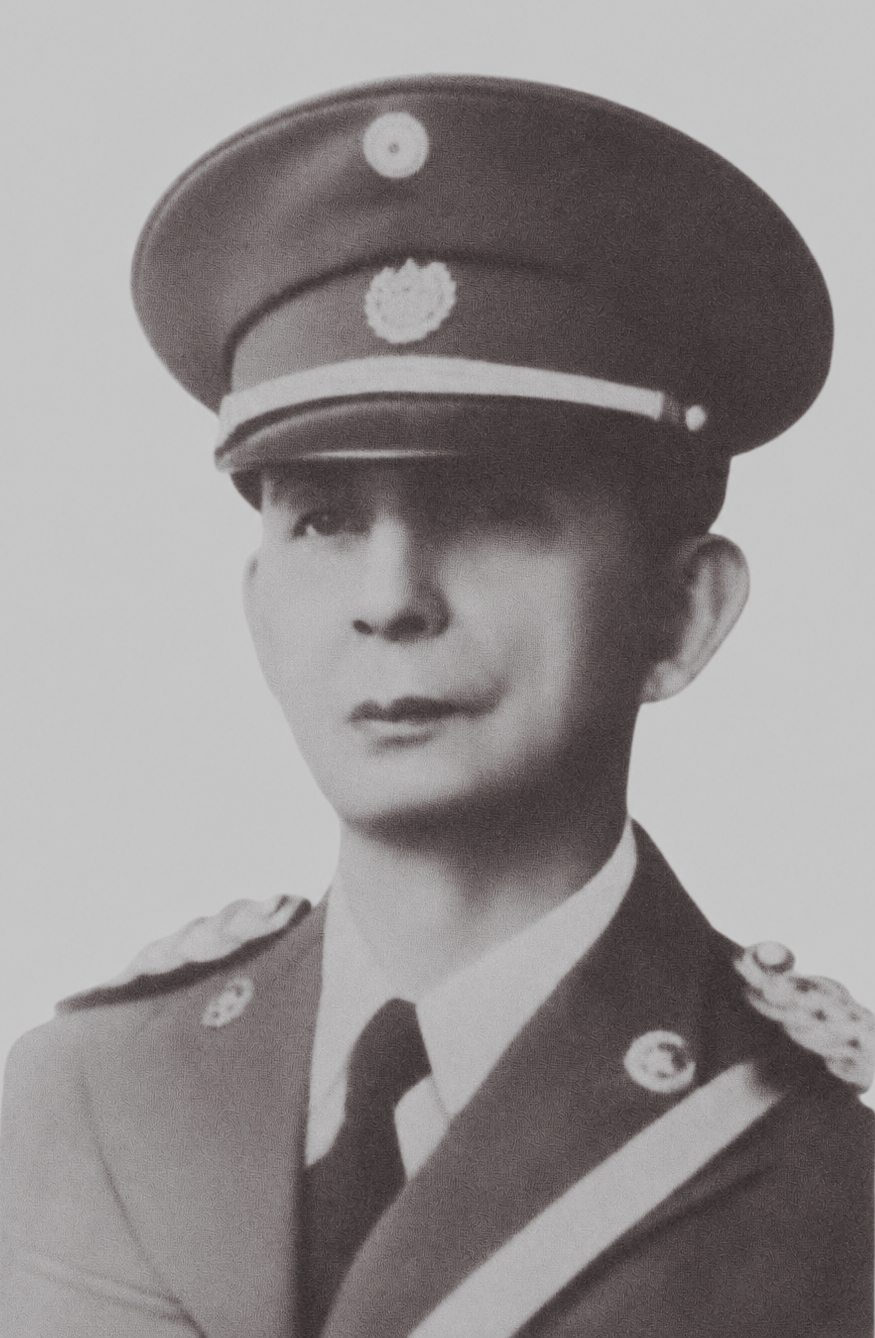
| Candidate | Salvador Castaneda Castro | Osmín Aguirre y Salinas |
| Party | Social Democratic Unification | Social Democratic |
| Popular vote | 312,754 | 690 |
| Percentage | 99.70% | 0.22% |
President before election
Osmín Aguirre y Salinas
Social Democratic
Elected President
Salvador Castaneda Castro
Social Democratic Unification

Presidential elections were held in El Salvador between 14 and 16 January 1945. The result was a victory for Salvador Castaneda Castro of the Social Democratic Unification Party. The election was boycotted by five candidates who withdrew after accusing Osmín Aguirre y Salinas of unfair practices to ensure victory for his favoured candidate.

== Results ==
| Candidate | Party | Votes | % |
|---|---|---|---|
| Salvador Castaneda Castro | Social Democratic Unification Party | 312,754 | 99.70 |
| Osmín Aguirre y Salinas | Social Democratic Party | 690 | 0.22 |
| Antonio Claramount Lucero | Progressive Fraternal Party | 165 | 0.05 |
| Arturo Romero | Democratic Union Party | 55 | 0.02 |
| Napoleón Viera Altamirano | Republican Social Front | 29 | 0.01 |
| José Cipriano Castro | Salvadoran People's Party | 1 | 0.00 |
| Total | | 313,694 | 100.00 |
Source: Ruddle et al.

== Bibliography ==
- Krehm, William (1957) Democracia y tiranias en el Caribe Buenos Aires: Editorial Parnaso
- Larde y Larin, Jorge (1958) Guía histórica de El Salvador San Salvador: Ministerio de cultura
- Herman, Edward S. and Frank Brodhead (1984) Demonstration elections: U.S.-staged elections in the Dominican Republic, Vietnam, and El Salvador Boston: South End Press
- Political Handbook of the world, 1945 New York, 1946
- Webre, Stephen (1979) José Napoleón Duarte and the Christian Democratic Party in Salvadoran Politics 1960-1972 Baton Rouge: Louisiana State University Press
