= Reynaldo Galindo Pohl =

Salvadoran lawyer and diplomat (1918–2012)

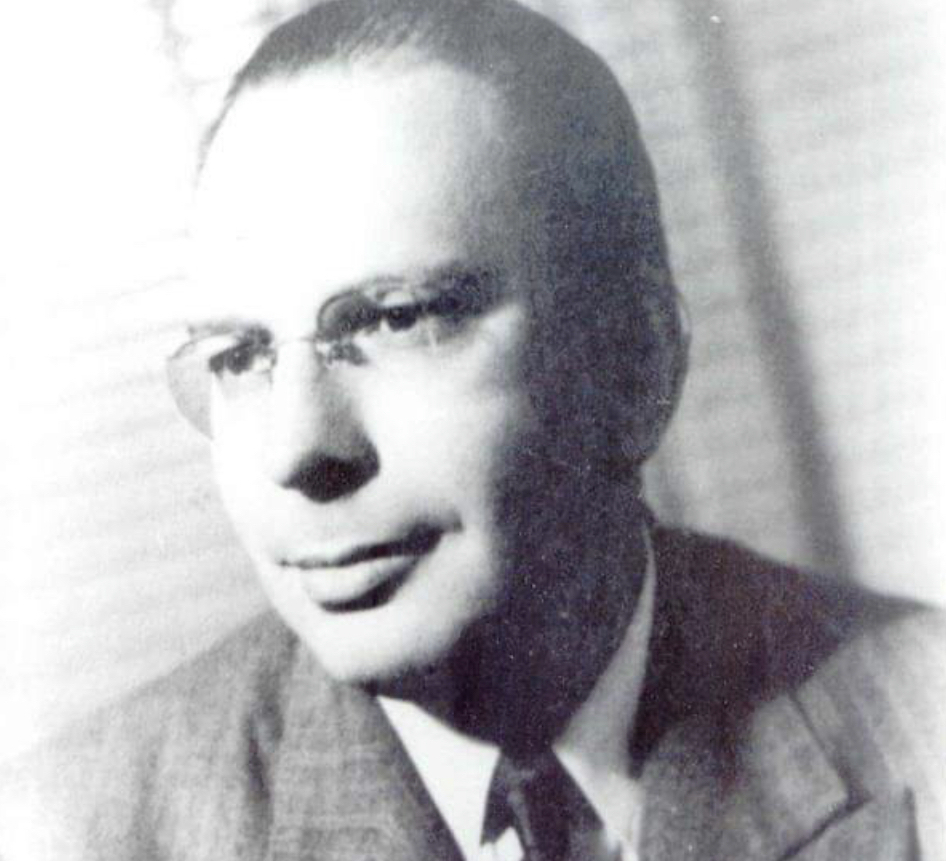

United Nations Special Rapporteur for Human Rights in Iran
- In office 1986–1995
- Preceded by: Andrés Aguilar
- Succeeded by: Maurice Copithorne

President of the Legislative Assembly of El Salvador
- In office 1950–1952
- Preceded by: Ricardo Rivas Vides
- Succeeded by: José María Peralta Salazar

Personal details
- Born: 21 October 1918 Sonsonate, El Salvador
- Died: January 4, 2012 (aged 93) San Salvador, El Salvador
- Spouse: Esperanza Galindo Velez
- Education: Universidad de El Salvador

Reynaldo Galindo Pohl (Sonsonate, October 21, 1918 – San Salvador, January 4, 2012) was a Salvadoran lawyer and diplomat. He actively participated in the military movement which led to overthrew of Salvador Castaneda Castro in 1948. Galindo Pohl was a member of Revolutionary Government Junta of El Salvador and presided over the Constituent Assembly that drafted the Constitution of 1950. He was the minister of education in the first half of 1950s and after that begun working for United Nations in 1960s.

He was special rapporteur of the Commission of Human Rights on Iran from 1986 to 1995 — after Andres Aguilar (1984-1986) and before Maurice Copithorne (1995-2002).

== Books ==
- Schabas, W. (2002). The Abolition of the Death Penalty in International Law. Cambridge University Press. ISBN 9780521893442.
- De Greiff, P.; Mayer-Rieckh, A. (2007). Justice as Prevention: Vetting Public Employees in Transitional Societies. A Columbia / SSRC Book Series. Social Science Research Council. ISBN 9780979077210.
