= José María Lemus =

President of El Salvador from 1956 to 1960

Lieutenant Colonel José María Lemus
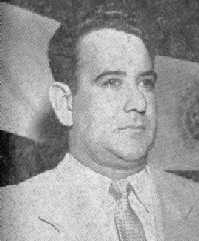
- Lemus in 1956

30th President of El Salvador
- In office 14 September 1956 – 26 October 1960
- Vice President: Humberto Costa
- Preceded by: Óscar Osorio
- Succeeded by: Junta of Government; Eusebio Cordón Cea as President

Personal details
- Born: 22 July 1911 La Unión, El Salvador
- Died: 31 March 1993 (aged 81) San José, Costa Rica
- Party: Revolutionary Party of Democratic Unification
- Spouse: Coralia Párraga de Lemus
- Children: 7
- Occupation: Politician, military

Military service
- Allegiance: El Salvador
- Branch/service: Salvadoran Army
- Years of service: 1933–1960
- Rank: Lieutenant colonel

José María Lemus López (22 July 1911 – 31 March 1993) was president of El Salvador from 14 September 1956 to 26 October 1960. Before becoming a president, he served as an undersecretary of defense and a minister of the interior.

== Life and career ==
He was born into a family of humble beginnings in La Unión, El Salvador. He was undersecretary of defense from 1948 to 1949. As President Óscar Osorio's choice for the successor to presidency, he antagonized many by fighting against corruption. Having won the disputed election of 1956, he appointed prominent civilians into his government and allowed many exiles to return the country.

He was a member of the Party of Democratic Unification. He continued socio-economic reforms of his predecessor, but there was no improvement in the living standards of the working class. He promulgated the Tenant Law, which protects the rights of the renters of houses or "Mesones, called also Vecindades" (apartment units with shared bathrooms). The law stipulating that landlords cannot increase the rent more than 10% every year made rent contract in houses obligatory with the objective of protecting the renter.

His government repealed the anti-sedition laws, therefore antagonizing the military. His government's decision to control the production of coffee infuriated the public. Soon after the Cuban revolution, there were widespread student protests. There was a subsequent roundup of dissidents and protesters.

== Overthrow and death ==
Following these uncertainties, he was overthrown in a bloodless coup and a new, short-lived Junta government was formed consisting of three military (Miguel Ángel Castillo, César Yanes Urías, Rubén Alonso Rosales) and three civilian (Ricardo Falla Cáceres, Fabio Castillo Figueroa, Rene Fortín Magaña).

After his exile, he lived in New York City until his death in San Jose, Costa Rica. He died of Hodgkin's lymphoma, leaving behind a wife and eight children.

== Bibliography ==
- "Terra España - Noticias, deportes, música, moda y más". Terra.es.

Political offices
Preceded by Óscar Osorio	President of El Salvador; 1956–1960	Succeeded by Military Junta
