= Julio Adalberto Rivera Carballo =

President of El Salvador from 1962 to 1967

Lieutenant Colonel Julio Adalberto Rivera
- Rivera in c. 1962–1967

31st President of El Salvador
- In office 1 July 1962 – 1 July 1967
- Vice President: Francisco Roberto Lima
- Preceded by: Eusebio Rodolfo Cordón Cea
- Succeeded by: Fidel Sánchez Hernández

Personal details
- Born: 2 September 1921 Zacatecoluca, El Salvador
- Died: 29 July 1973 (aged 51) San José Guayabal, El Salvador
- Party: National Conciliation Party
- Spouse: Berta de Rivera
- Education: Captain General Gerardo Barrios Military School
- Profession: Military, politician

Military service
- Allegiance: El Salvador
- Branch/service: Salvadoran Army
- Rank: Lieutenant colonel

Julio Adalberto Rivera Carballo (2 September 1921 – 29 July 1973) was a Salvadoran politician and military officer, who was the 34th President of El Salvador, in office from 1962 to 1967.

== Early life and career ==
Rivera was born in Zacatecoluca, El Salvador. He was a military officer who helped to orchestrate a coup in 1961. From January to September of that year, he was a member of the Civic-Military Directory which ruled El Salvador at that time. In 1962 he was elected president for a 5-year term as the candidate of the National Conciliation Party. As president, he signed the Alianza para el Progreso with the United States and accepted a good amount of money to build low-cost housing for Salvadorans, such as the Zacamil buildings and other public works. The Times Magazines from March 16, 1962, said "Colonel Julio Rivera, is loosening the control of "the 14," a group of land and banking families who have ruled the country since Spanish colonial days", and recognized the biggest effort from the 19 Latin American countries that signed the document during the term of U.S. President John F. Kennedy.

At the same time, he started a Secret Service called ANSESAL and the head of this agency was Coronel Medrano, a CIA informant. He is known to have started Death Squads in El Salvador using military intelligence and personnel. They would interrogate and eliminate leftist suspects in both the countryside and in the capital. After leaving public office he went on to serve as Ambassador of El Salvador to the United States and the United Nations. During his tenure as president, he was often seen driving through the streets of San Salvador on his 1965 Harley-Davidson motorcycle.

== Later life and death ==
From 1968 to 1973, he served as Ambassador to the United States. He died on July 29, 1973, aged 51.

Political offices
Preceded by Eusebio Rodolo Cordón	President of El Salvador; 1962–1967	Succeeded by Fidel Sánchez
