= List of political parties in El Salvador =

This article lists political parties in El Salvador.

== Political culture ==
El Salvador has a multi-party system. Two political parties, the Nationalist Republican Alliance (ARENA) and the Farabundo Martí National Liberation Front (FMLN), had traditionally dominated politics. ARENA candidates won four consecutive presidential elections until the election of Mauricio Funes of the FMLN in March 2009.

Geographically, the departments of the Central region, especially the capital and the coastal regions, known as departamentos rojos, or red departments, are relatively Leftist. The departamentos azules, or blue departments in the east, western and highland regions are relatively conservative.

In February 2021, El Salvador's legislative election was an important breakthrough. The new party, founded by President Nayib Bukele, Nuevas Ideas, won around two-thirds of votes with its allies (GANA-New Ideas). His party won supermajority 56 seats in the 84-seat parliament. Bukele became the country’s most powerful leader in three decades.

== Political parties ==
=== Registered parties ===
Flag	Name	Abbr	Leader	Ideology	Legislative Assembly	Mayors	PARLACEN	Political position
	Christian Democratic Party; Partido Demócrata Cristiano	PDC	Reinaldo Carballo	Christian democracy	1 / 60	4 / 44	1 / 20	Center to Center-left
	Farabundo Martí National Liberation Front; Frente Farabundo Martí para la Liberación Nacional	FMLN	Manuel Flores	Left-wing nationalism; Left-wing populism	0 / 60	0 / 44	2 / 20	Left-wing
	Grand Alliance for National Unity; Gran Alianza por la Unidad Nacional	GANA	Nelson Guardado	Conservative liberalism; Right-wing populism	0 / 60	6 / 44	2 / 20	Center-right
	Let's Go; Vamos	V	Cesia Rivas	Christian democracy Liberalism	1 / 60	0 / 44	0 / 20	Center
	Nationalist Republican Alliance; Alianza Republicana Nacionalista	ARENA	Carlos García Saade	Conservatism; Economic liberalism; Anti-communism	2 / 60	1 / 44	2 / 20	Center-right to right-wing
	New Ideas; Nuevas Ideas	NI	Xavier Zablah Bukele	Populism; Bukelism	54 / 60	26 / 44	13 / 20	Big tent
	National Coalition Party; Partido de Concertación Nacional	PCN	Manuel Rodríguez	Nationalism	2 / 60	3 / 44	0 / 20	Center-right
	Salvadoran Democracy; Democracia Salvadoreña	DS	Ezequiel Mendoza Fermán	Progressivism	0 / 60	0 / 44	0 / 20	Center-left
	Salvadoran Independent Party; Partido Independiente Salvadoreño	PAIS	Roy García	Reformism	0 / 60	0 / 44	0 / 20	Center
	Salvadoran Patriotic Fraternity; Fraternidad Patriota Salvadoreña	FPS	Óscar Morales Lemus	Anti-communism	0 / 60	0 / 44	0 / 20	Right-wing
	Solidary Force; Fuerza Solidaria	FS	Rigoberto Soto	Conservatism	0 / 60	1 / 44	0 / 20	Right-wing

=== Unregistered parties ===
Flag	Name	Abbr	Leader	Ideology	Political position
	Democratic Change; Cambio Democrático	CD	Javier Milián	Social democracy	Center-left
	Our Time; Nuestro Tiempo	NT	Andy Failer	Progressivism	Center to Center-left
	Total Change; Cambio Total	TC	Ronal Umaña	Reformism	Center-left

=== Defunct ===
- Authentic Constitutional Party (Partido Constitucional Auténtico, PCA)
- Authentic Democratic Christian Movement (Movimiento Cristiano Democrático Auténtico, MCDA)
- Christian Force (Fuerza Cristiana, FC)
- Communist Party of El Salvador (Partido Comunista de El Salvador, PCES)
- Constitutional Party (Partido Constitucional, PC)
- Democratic Action (Acción Democrático, AD)
- Democratic Convergence (Convergencia Democrática, CD)
- Democratic Republican League (Lega Republicana Democrática, LRD)
- Democratic Union Party (Partido de Unión Democrático, PUD)
- Movement of National Solidarity (Movimiento de Solidaridad Nacional, MSN)
- Movement of Unity (Movimiento de Unidad, MU)
- National Action Party (Partido Acción Nacional, PAN)
- National Democratic Party (Partido Democrático Nacional, PDN)
- National Development Party, (Partido de Desarrollo Nacional, PDN)
- National Liberal Party (Partido Nacional Liberal, PNL)
- National Opposition Union (Unión Nacional Opuesto, UNO)
- National Pro Patria Party (Partido Nacional Pro Patria, PNPP)
- National Republican Party (Partido Republicano Nacional, PRN)
- Party of the United People and the New Deal (Partido de Pueblo Unido y el Nuevo Acuerdo, PPUNA)
- Patriotic Action Party (Partido Acción Patriótica, PAP)
- Popular Action (Acción Popular, AP)
- Popular Orientation Party (Partido de Orientación Popular, POP)
- Progressive Fraternal Party (Partido Fraternal Progresista, PFP)
- Renewal Movement (Movimiento Renovador, MR)
- Renovating Action Party (Partido Acción Renovadora, PAR)
- Republican Party for National Unity (Partido Republicano de Union Nacional, PRUN)
- Republican People's Party (Partido Popular Republicano, PPR)
- Republican Social Front (Frente Social Republicana, FSR)
- Revolutionary Party of Democratic Unification (Partido Revolucionario de Unificación Democrática, PRUD)
- Salvadoran Authentic Institutional Party (Partido Institucional Auténtico Salvadoreño, PIAS)
- Salvadoran Laborist Party (Partido Laborista Salvadoreña, PLS)
- Salvadoran People's Party (Partido del Pueblo Salvadoreño, PPS)
- Salvadoran Progressive Party (Partido Progresista Salvadoreña, PPS)
- Social Christian Union (Union Social Cristiana, UCS)
- Social Democratic Party (Partido Social Demócrata, PSD)
- Social Democratic Unification Party (Partido de Unificación Democrático Social, PUDS)
- Stable Republican Centrist Movement (Movimiento Centrista Republicana Estable, MCRE)
- United Democratic Centre (Centro Democrático Unido, CDU)
- United Independent Democratic Front (Frente Democrática Independiente Unida, FDIR)
- Unity Movement (Unidad Movimiento, UNIDAD)

== See also ==
- Elections in El Salvador
- Politics of El Salvador
