= Manuel Flores (Salvadoran politician) =

Salvadoran politician

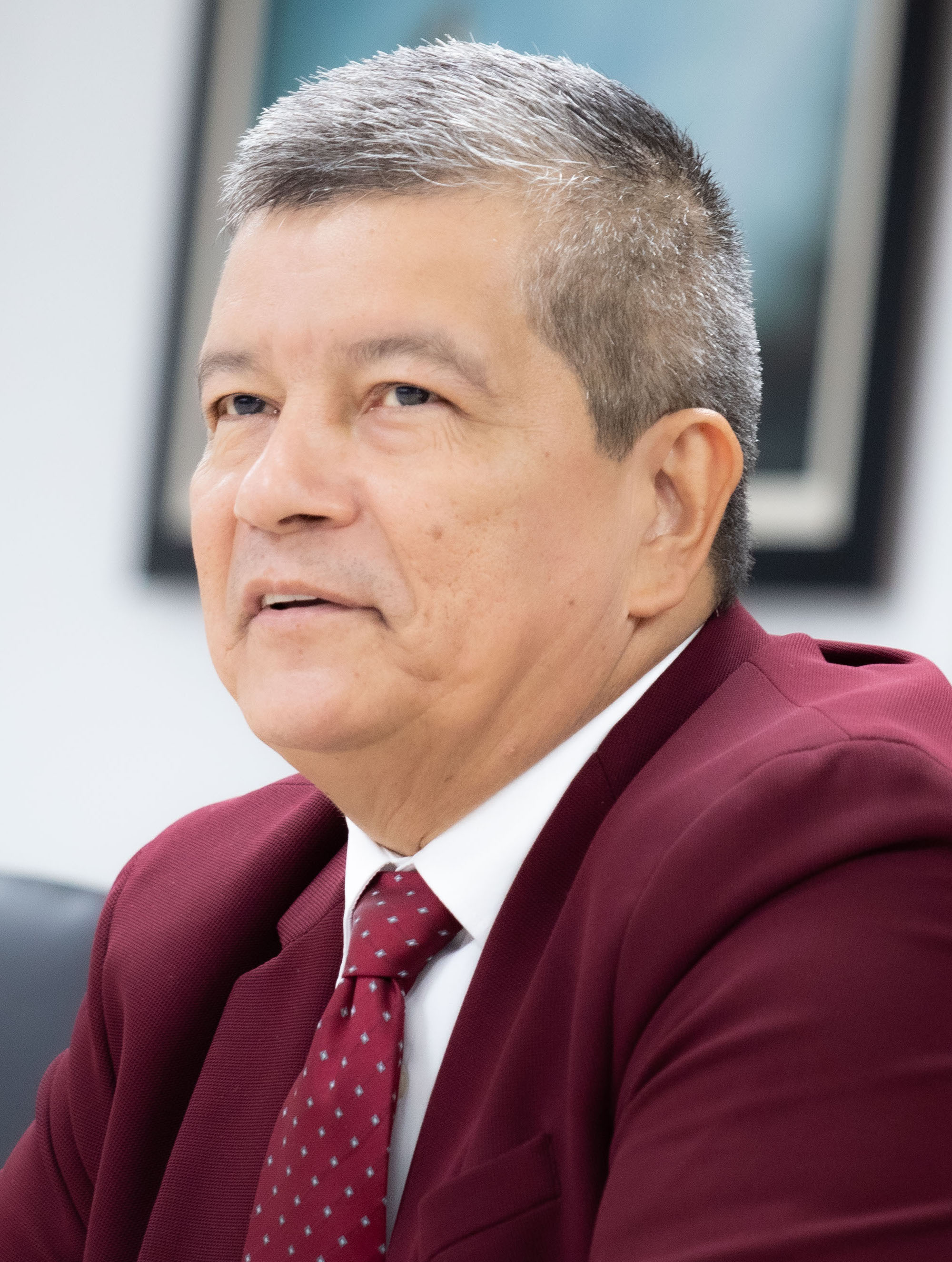
- Flores in 2023

Secretary-General of the Farabundo Martí National Liberation Front
- Incumbent
- Assumed office 4 August 2024
- Preceded by: Óscar Ortiz

Deputy of the Legislative Assembly of El Salvador from La Libertad
- In office 1 May 2012 – 1 May 2021

Mayor of Quezaltepeque
- In office 1 May 2003 – 1 May 2012
- Preceded by: Roberto Argüello
- Succeeded by: Carlos Antonio Figueroa

Personal details
- Born: Juan Manuel de Jesús Flores Cornejo; 15 October 1965 (age 60) Quezaltepeque, El Salvador
- Party: Farabundo Martí National Liberation Front
- Occupation: Politician
- Nickname: El Chino

Juan Manuel de Jesús Flores Cornejo (born 15 October 1965), nicknamed "El Chino" (Spanish for "The Chinese One"), is a Salvadoran politician who has served as the secretary-general of the Farabundo Martí National Liberation Front (FMLN) since 2024. Flores served as the mayor of Quezaltepeque from 2003 to 2012 and then later as a deputy of the Legislative Assembly from La Libertad from 2012 to 2021. He was the presidential candidate for the FMLN in the 2024 presidential election with running mate Werner Marroquín. He lost in a landslide to incumbent President Nayib Bukele, accumulating only 6.40 percent of the vote. Flores supports El Salvador further strengthening relations with the People's Republic of China.

== Early life ==
Juan Manuel de Jesús Flores Cornejo was born on 15 October 1965 in Quezaltepeque, El Salvador. He has a degree in biology. During the Salvadoran Civil War (1979–1992), Flores was a member of the Farabundo Martí Popular Liberation Forces (FPL), a part of the broader Farabundo Martí National Liberation Front (FMLN) guerilla group.

== Political career ==
=== Mayor of Quezaltepeque ===
In the 2000 legislative election, Flores was elected as a member of the Quezaltepeque municipal council as a member of the FMLN (by then a political party). In the 2003 municipal election, Flores was elected as the municipality's mayor, succeeding FMLN mayor Roberto Argüello. Flores was re-elected as mayor in 2006 and 2009.

=== Deputy of the Legislative Assembly ===
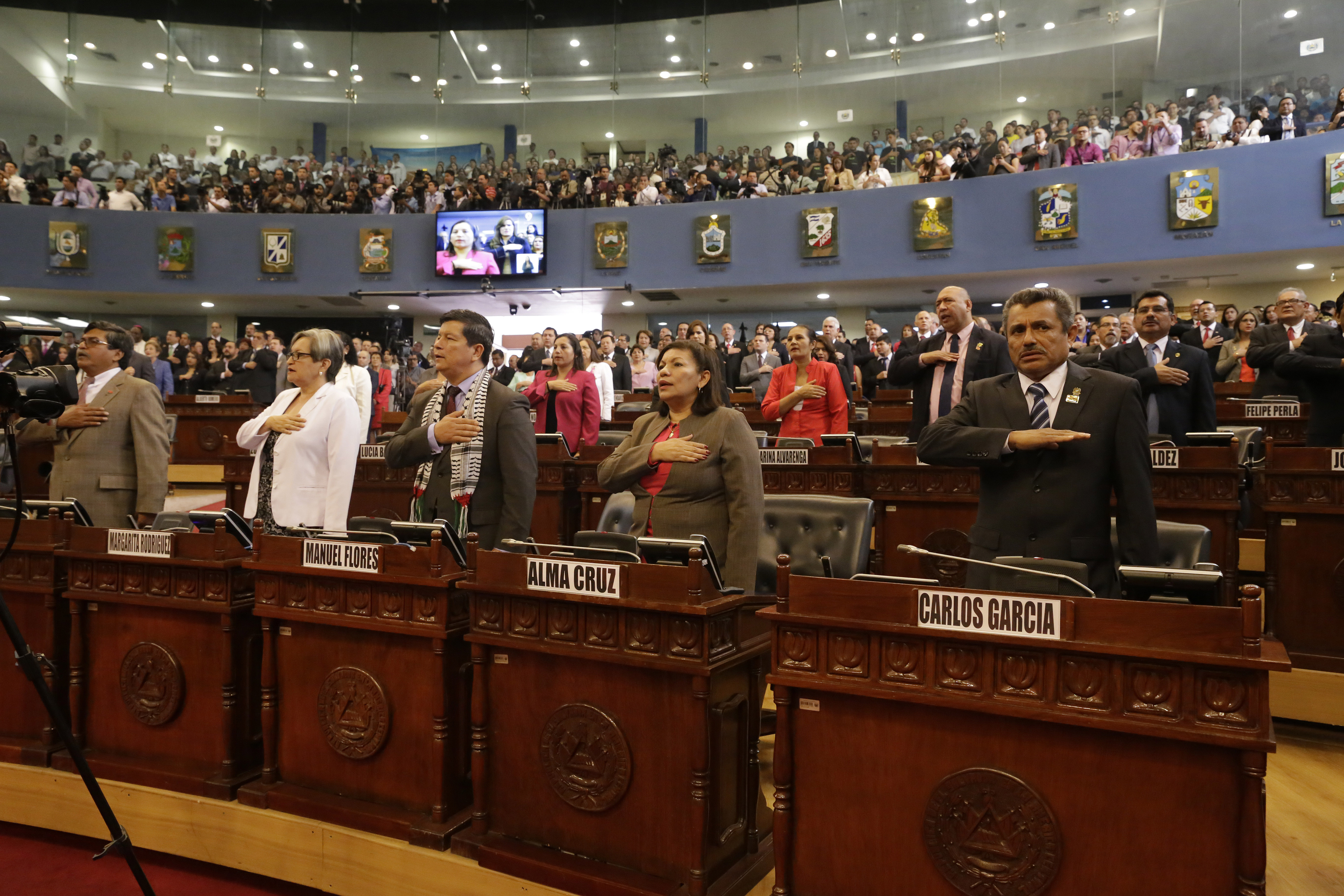
Flores (third from the left) as a deputy of the Legislative Assembly in 2016

In the 2012 legislative election, Flores was elected as a deputy the Legislative Assembly from the department of La Libertad, being the party's third deputy from the department. He was succeeded by Carlos Antonio Figueroa of the Nationalist Republican Alliance (ARENA) as mayor of Quezaltepeque. He was re-elected in the 2015 legislative election as the FMLN's fourth deputy from the department and again in the 2018 legislative election as the party's second deputy from the department.

Flores did not seek re-election in 2021 as FMLN party statutes prohibited deputies to seek three consecutive terms. Instead, Flores ran to be elected as a deputy of the Central American Parliament (PARLACEN) for the FMLN. In an interview with La Prensa Gráfica, Flores stated that the member states of PARLACEN should give "real power" ("autonomía real") to the organization's deputies. Of the 20 seats El Salvador has in PARLACEN, the FMLN only won a single seat; Flores lost his bid to serve as the FMLN's deputy to PARLACEN to Karina Sosa.

=== 2024 presidential campaign ===
In September 2020, Flores stated that he would one day be the president of El Salvador and that he would be a better president than Nayib Bukele, who won the 2019 presidential election after being expelled from the FMLN in 2017. He described Bukele as a "liar" ("mentiroso") and claimed that the Salvadoran population did not trust him.

Prior to the 2024 presidential election, Flores showed interest in running for president with the FMLN. Flores asked the party to not select politicians with a "corrupt past" ("pasado corrupto") ahead of the party's primary elections for the presidential, legislative, municipal, and PARLACEN elections. On 29 May 2023, Flores officially registered as a presidential pre-candidate with the FMLN, being the party's only candidate for president. Werner Marroquín was selected as his running mate. Flores stated that the FMLN would not form a coalition with any right-wing political parties, including ARENA. On 16 July 2023, Flores was officially confirmed as the FMLN's presidential candidate. On 7 September 2023, the FMLN began the process of registering Flores' and Marroquín's candidacies.

Regarding Bukele's 2024 re-election campaign, Flores stated "the law is the law [and] the law says that there is no re-election" ("la ley es la ley [y] la ley dice que no hay reelección"). He added that the constitution is "clear" ("clara") that re-election is prohibited. In August 2023, Flores stated that both he and the FMLN would be committed to fighting corruption. In the election, Flores finished in second place with 204,167 votes—6.40 percent; Bukele won re-election with 84.65 percent of the vote. Flores refused to concede the election, claiming that "they stole votes from me" ("me han robado votos").

=== Secretary-General of the FMLN ===
In March 2024, Flores announced his intention to become the secretary-general of the FMLN. His primary opponent was Simón Paz, the former mayor of Mejicanos from 2015 to 2021. On 14 July, the FMLN named Flores as the winner with 60 percent of ballots counted. He called for former deputies who left the FMLN to return to the party. He will assume office when the FMLN confirms the results with the TSE.

On 24 July 2024, Flores stated that the FMLN would win seats in the Legislative Assembly and municipal mayorships in the 2027 legislative election after the party lost all its legislative seats and municipalities in the 2024 election. Flores became the party's secretary-general on 4 August 2024 at its 44th National Convention.

== Political views ==
=== Relations with China ===
Flores prefers having diplomatic relations with the People's Republic of China over the Republic of China (Taiwan). In 2004, Flores established the Salvadoran Association of Friendship with the People of China (ASACHI). Flores has funded organizations in Costa Rica, El Salvador, and Nicaragua which support relations with China, including the Central American Federation of Friendship with China. Flores has previously served as El Salvador's ambassador to Taiwan. In 2018, Flores helped the Salvadoran government officially recognize the People's Republic of China as the legitimate government of China, severing its relations with Taiwan. Regarding China, Flores stated that "China is not an invader, it is not a colonizer". In 2021, Flores celebrated China's donation of 150,000 COVID-19 vaccines to El Salvador. In addition to China, Flores also supports strengthened relations with Palestine and the Sahrawi Arab Democratic Republic.

Flores' nickname is "El Chino", Spanish for "The Chinese One".

== Electoral history ==
Year	Office	Type	Party	Main opponent	Party	Votes for Flores				Result	Swing
Year	Office	Type	Party	Main opponent	Party	Total	%	P.	±%	Result	Swing
2000	Municipal Council of Quezaltepeque	General	FMLN	N/A						Won	N/A
2003	Mayor of Quezaltepeque	General	FMLN	?	ARENA	?	?	1st	N/A	Won	Hold
2006	Mayor of Quezaltepeque	General	FMLN	?	ARENA	10,250	57.42	1st	?	Won	Hold
2009	Mayor of Quezaltepeque	General	FMLN	?	ARENA	9,778	48.88	1st	–8.54	Won	Hold
2012	Deputy of the Legislative Assembly	General	FMLN	N/A				3rd	N/A	Won	N/A
2015	Deputy of the Legislative Assembly	General	FMLN	N/A				4th	N/A	Won	N/A
2018	Deputy of the Legislative Assembly	General	FMLN–CD	N/A				2nd	N/A	Won	N/A
2021	Deputy of PARLACEN	General	FMLN	N/A				2nd	N/A	Lost	N/A
2024	President of El Salvador	General	FMLN	Nayib Bukele	NI	204,167	6.40	2nd	N/A	Lost	Hold
2024	Secretary-General of the FMLN	Internal	FMLN	Simón Paz	FMLN	5,547	60.19	1st	N/A	Won	N/A

Political offices
Preceded by Roberto Argüello	Mayor of Quezaltepeque; 2003–2012	Succeeded by Carlos Antonio Figueroa
Party political offices
Preceded by Hugo Martínez (2019)	FMLN nominee for President of El Salvador; 2024	Succeeded by Rafael Aguirre
Preceded by Óscar Ortiz	Secretary-General of the Farabundo Martí National Liberation Front; 2024–present	Incumbent
