= Palestinian Salvadorans =

Palestinian Salvadorans فلسطينيو السلفادور
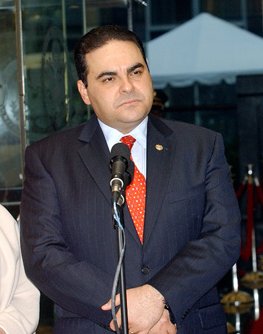
Antonio Saca

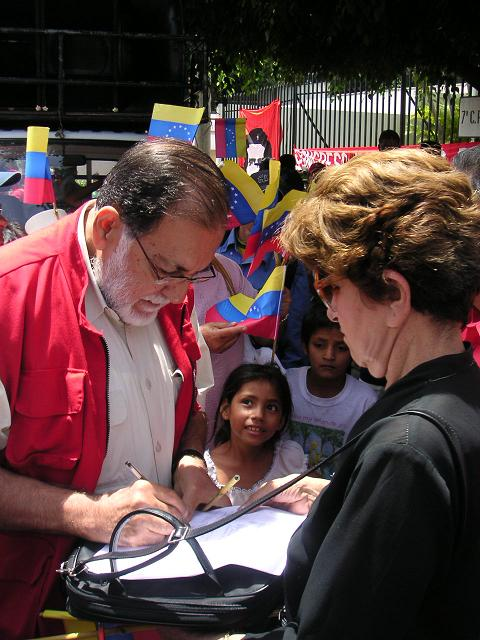
Schafik Hándal

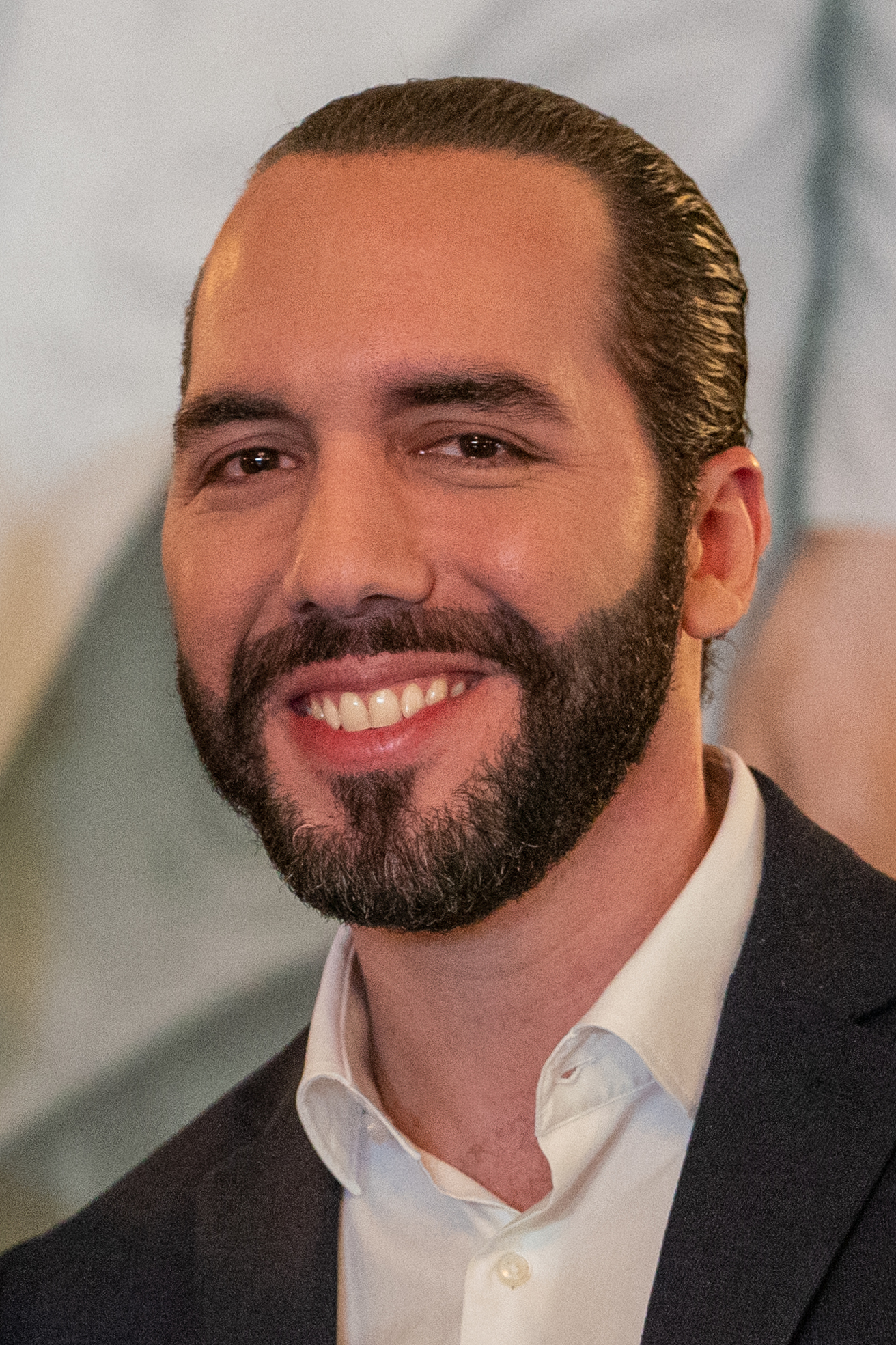
Nayib Bukele

Total population
- 90,000 – 100,000

Regions with significant populations
- San Salvador

Languages
- Salvadoran Spanish (national) · Palestinian Arabic (heritage)

Religion
- Christianity (95%) · Islam (5%)

Related ethnic groups
- Other Arab Salvadorans, Palestinian diaspora, Arab diaspora

Palestinian Salvadorans (Spanish: Salvadoreños Palestinos; Arabic: فلسطينيو السلفادور), are Salvadoran citizens of Palestinian descent or Palestine-born people residing in El Salvador. There are approximately 90,000 to 100,000 Salvadorans with Palestinian ancestry.

The Palestinian community in El Salvador is the second largest in Central America, after the Arab community in Honduras.

The first Palestinians arrived in the late 19th, but they continued to arrive in the early 20th century, during the 1948 Arab–Israeli War, thousands of Palestinians arrived in El Salvador.

== History ==
Palestinians, mostly from Bethlehem (90%), but also from Jerusalem, came to El Salvador during the early 20th century. These immigrants were looking for economic opportunities, as well as escaping conscription into Ottoman Army during the waning years of the Ottoman Empire. Most of the Palestinians who came were Orthodox Christians. Initially, these migrants came to the country with the intention of going back to their homelands, but some decided to stay and start their families in El Salvador. Because of their Ottoman passports, Middle Easterners in Central America were labeled as "Turks," and barred from civil society, public organizations and government posts. In the 1930s and 1940s, laws barred them from immigrating into the country, as they were looked down on by the elite.

=== Discrimination ===
Discrimination and xenophobia ran deep; legacies of Spain's racially obsessed colonial policies in Latin America divided subjects into more than a dozen different ethnic classifications. As the Palestinians achieved economic success, they were seen as economic rivals by the local elite and were socially and politically isolated by them. In El Salvador, Maximiliano Hernández Martínez issued laws that banned Palestinians, among other ethnicities and nationalities, from immigrating and/or starting a business in the country. While discrimination against Palestinians died down considerably, as recently as 2000, a conservative Salvadoran political commentator, Rafael Colindres, wrote an essay suggesting, "Perhaps a pogrom would be the solution to the Turk problem."

=== Salvadoran Civil War ===
The Salvadoran Civil War affected the Palestinian community as much as it affected any other community in the country. While the wealthier families of Palestinian descent supported the pro-business, pro-American, and pro-Israeli Salvadoran government and military, there are Salvadorans of Palestinian descent that support the communist guerrillas of the FMLN. Schafik Handal, a Salvadoran of Palestinian descent, is a good example of this as he was one of the five commanders of the FMLN.

After the Civil War ended, most of the old Salvadoran elite lost their power and influence on the economic and political advancements of post-war El Salvador. After being shunned from the political process of the country, Palestinians found new life in the country and began to take advantage of the neoliberal direction of the country as championed by the ARENA party during the 1990s. All of this culminated in the Salvadoran presidential election of 2004, where both candidates, Antonio Saca and Schafik Handal, were the first two Salvadoran of Palestinian descent to run for President and would guarantee that the office would be held by a Palestinian.

== Culture ==
The Palestinians in El Salvador display an amalgam of local and imported lifestyles.

Palestinian culture has begun to emerge from within private circles into the public domain, most visibly in the creation of the Plaza Palestina, which commemorates the Bethlehem roots of most of El Salvador's Arabs, in San Salvador.

The public charity of Middle Easterners in the country has contributed to this effect. The wealthy Simán family members sponsor a free drug rehabilitation program in El Salvador and a scholarship fund for Palestinians at the Catholic Bethlehem University.

== Notable people ==
- Francisco Alabi, current Minister of Health
- Joaquín Alabi, footballer
- Rafael Arce Zablah, activist
- Gerardo Awad, politician
- Jorge Elias Bahaia, businessman
- Nayib Bukele, current president of El Salvador
- Yusef Bukele
- Soraya Comandari Zanotti, half Palestinian/half Italian descent. Represented El Salvador at the 1976 edition of Miss World
- Juan José Daboub, former Minister of Finance (1999-2004)
- Analu Dada, singer
- Héctor Dada Hirezi, politician
- Isabel Dada, actress
- Rebeca Davila Dada, Miss El Salvador 1991
- Schafik Handal, politician and presidential candidate of El Salvador
- Guillermo Hasbún, president of CIFCO
- Hato Hasbun, politician
- Muriel Hasbun, artist
- Jacobo Kattán, C.D. FAS footballer
- Miguel Kattán, politician
- Mayella Mena Mahomar, Nuestra Belleza El Salvador 2009
- Alfredo Ruano Safie, footballer
- Antonio Saca, former President of El Salvador (2004-2009)
- Rolando Saca, racing driver
- Óscar Antonio Safie, founder of Megavisión El Salvador
- Carlos Samour, American judge
- Gerardo Jose Siman-Siri, CEO of HSBC El Salvador
- Javier Simán, businessman
- Jose J. Simán, founder of SIMAN
- John H. Sununu, American politician, whose mother is a Palestinian Salvadoran
- Arturo Zablah, businessman
- Xavier Zablah Bukele, politician

== See also ==
- El Salvador–Palestine relations
- Palestinian diaspora
