= Óscar Ortiz (Salvadoran politician) =

Salvadoran politician

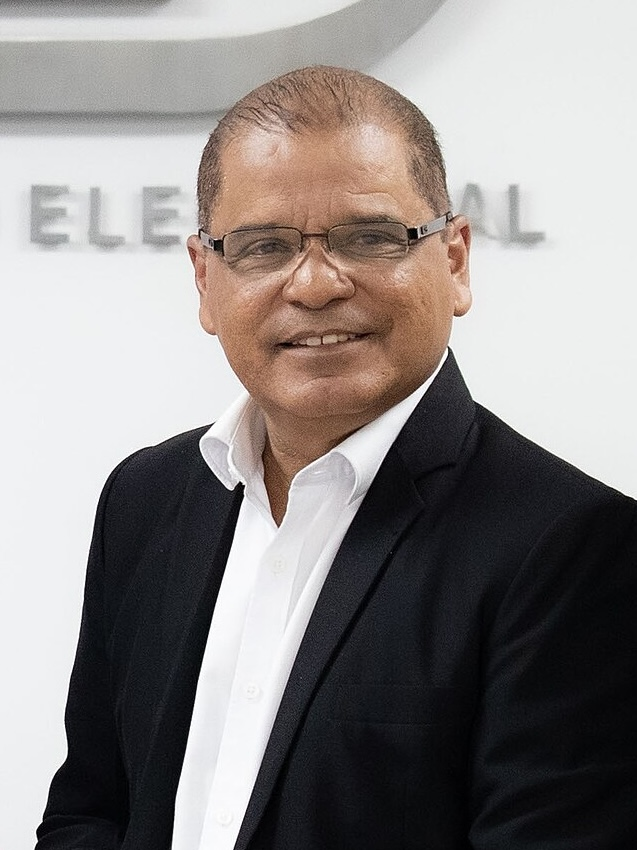
- Ortiz in 2023

49th Vice President of El Salvador
- In office 1 June 2014 – 1 June 2019
- President: Salvador Sánchez Cerén
- Preceded by: Salvador Sánchez Cerén
- Succeeded by: Félix Ulloa

Mayor of Santa Tecla (Note: Known as Nueva San Salvador until 1 January 2004.)
- In office 1 May 2000 – 1 May 2015
- Preceded by: Miriam Haydee Zometa
- Succeeded by: Roberto d'Aubuisson

Secretary General of the Farabundo Martí National Liberation Front
- In office 7 July 2019 – 4 August 2024
- Preceded by: Medardo González
- Succeeded by: Manuel Flores

Personal details
- Born: Óscar Samuel Ortiz Ascencio; 14 February 1961 (age 65) San Alejo, El Salvador
- Party: Farabundo Martí National Liberation Front
- Spouse: Elda Tobar de Ortiz

Óscar Samuel Ortiz Ascencio (born 14 February 1961) is a Salvadoran politician who served as the 36th Vice President of El Salvador from 2014 to 2019. Previously he was the Mayor of Santa Tecla. He was first elected to that position in 2000, and he was re-elected in 2003, 2006, 2009 and 2012.

Ortiz is a member of the Farabundo Martí National Liberation Front (FMLN), the main left-wing party in El Salvador. In 2003 Ortiz lost the party's primary vote to Schafik Hándal by 47% to 53% to decide who would be the party's candidate in the 2004 presidential election. In March 2014, he was elected as vice president alongside the FMLN's presidential candidate, Salvador Sánchez Cerén.

Ortiz was born in San Alejo on 14 February 1961. During El Salvador's civil war from 1980 to 1992, Ortiz was a combatant with the Popular Liberation Forces - Farabundo Martí (FPL), one of the five organizations that comprised the FMLN. During the civil war, he went under the pseudonym of Guillermo Rodríguez, and led a guerrilla column in the department of Usulután in the east of El Salvador. He was thought of as less ideological than other guerrilla commanders. He was eventually wounded in combat in 1983 and went to Nicaragua for medical treatment, before coming back to El Salvador in 1987. He was member of parliament for the FMLN from 1994 to 2000. He has been considered one of the most successful Salvadoran mayors for his 13-year-long tenure in Santa Tecla (2000–2013), a post which he left when selected as candidate for the vice presidency in the 2014 presidential election.

== Notes ==
Political offices
Preceded by Salvador Sánchez Cerén	Vice President of El Salvador; 2014–2019	Succeeded by Félix Ulloa
Party political offices
Preceded by Medardo González	Secretary General of the Farabundo Martí National Liberation Front; 2019–2024	Succeeded by Manuel Flores
