= Cambio Democrático =

Cambio Democrático may refer to:

- Democratic Change (El Salvador)
- Democratic Change (Panama)
