= 2003 Salvadoran legislative election =

← 2000	16 March 2003	2006 →
- All 84 seats in the Legislative Assembly; 43 seats needed for a majority
Party	Leader	Vote %	Seats	+/–
FMLN	Salvador Sánchez Cerén	33.96	31	0
ARENA	Archic Baldocchi Duenas	31.91	27	−2
PCN	Ciro Cruz Zepeda	12.95	16	+3
PDC	Rodolfo Parker	7.28	5	−1
CDU		6.37	5	+2
This lists parties that won seats. See the complete results below.
Results by constituency

Legislative elections were held in El Salvador on 16 March 2003 to elect 84 deputies to the Legislative Assembly for a term of three years. The main opposition party, the Farabundo Martí National Liberation Front (FMLN), won the most seats in election at 31. However the governing Nationalist Republican Alliance (ARENA) won enough seats to continue in government with the Party of National Conciliation (PCN).

== Background ==
ARENA had controlled the government of El Salvador since winning the 1989 presidential election. The 2003 legislative election was the fifth election since the ending of the Salvadoran Civil War in 1992.

== Campaign ==
In total 11 political parties contested the election but it was seen as being primarily between ARENA and the opposition FMLN. ARENA campaigned for a mandate to continue the economic reforms they had been pursuing but was hurt in the election by a recent six-month strike by doctors. Meanwhile, FMLN won support from those who did not feel they have benefited from the economic reforms introduced by ARENA and they attacked the government over crime and declining economic growth.

There were five deaths during the campaign related to the election and for three days around the election a ban on the sales of alcohol was introduced to prevent any trouble. Election day itself saw problems with the electoral list, with reports of voters not being on the list, while some dead people were listed. Turnout was low with only slightly less than 39% voting.

== Results ==
The FMLN remained the largest party in the Legislative Assembly winning 31 seats the same as the previous election in 2000. ARENA lost two seats, but with their allies the Party of National Conciliation gaining 3 seats, they retained a majority. At the same time as the legislative election, the 262 municipalities held elections with the FMLN retaining the most important post, the mayoralty of San Salvador, when Carlos Rivas Zamora defeated Evelyn Jacir de Lovo of ARENA.

Party	Votes	%	Seats	+/–
Farabundo Martí National Liberation Front	475,146	33.96	31	0
Nationalist Republican Alliance	446,381	31.91	27	–2
National Conciliation Party	181,168	12.95	16	+3
Christian Democratic Party	101,855	7.28	5	–1
United Democratic Centre	89,121	6.37	5	+2
Renewal Movement	26,298	1.88	0	New
Republican People's Party	22,783	1.63	0	New
Popular Action	15,998	1.14	0	New
Christian Force	15,468	1.11	0	New
National Action Party	14,553	1.04	0	–2
Social Democratic Party	10,206	0.73	0	New
Total	1,398,977	100.00	84	0
Valid votes	1,398,977	96.39		
Invalid/blank votes	52,350	3.61		
Total votes	1,451,327	100.00		
Registered voters/turnout	3,537,091	41.03		
Source: IFES
