= 2006 Salvadoran legislative election =

← 2003	12 March 2006	2009 →
- All 84 seats in the Legislative Assembly; 43 seats needed for a majority
Party	Leader	Vote %	Seats	+/–
FMLN	Medardo González	39.29	32	+1
ARENA		39.20	34	+7
PCN	Ciro Cruz Zepeda	11.42	10	−6
PDC	Rodolfo Parker	6.93	6	+1
CD		3.05	2	New
This lists parties that won seats. See the complete results below.
Results by constituency

Legislative elections were held in El Salvador on 12 March 2006. Although the Farabundo Martí National Liberation Front received the most votes, the Nationalist Republican Alliance emerged as the largest party, winning 34 of the 84 seats.

== Results ==
Party	Votes	%	Seats	+/–
Farabundo Martí National Liberation Front	785,072	39.29	32	+1
Nationalist Republican Alliance	783,230	39.20	34	+7
National Conciliation Party	228,196	11.42	10	–6
Christian Democratic Party	138,538	6.93	6	+1
Democratic Change	61,022	3.05	2	New
National Liberal Party	1,956	0.10	0	New
Total	1,998,014	100.00	84	0
Valid votes	1,998,014	96.95		
Invalid/blank votes	62,875	3.05		
Total votes	2,060,889	100.00		
Registered voters/turnout	3,801,040	54.22		
Source: TSE, Election Resources
