= Popular Action =

Popular Action may refer to:

- Actio popularis, in Roman penal law
- Popular Action (El Salvador)
- Popular Action (Italy)
- Popular Action (Peru)
- Popular Action (Spain)
