= Roberto José d'Aubuisson Munguía =

Salvadoran politician

Roberto d'Aubuisson
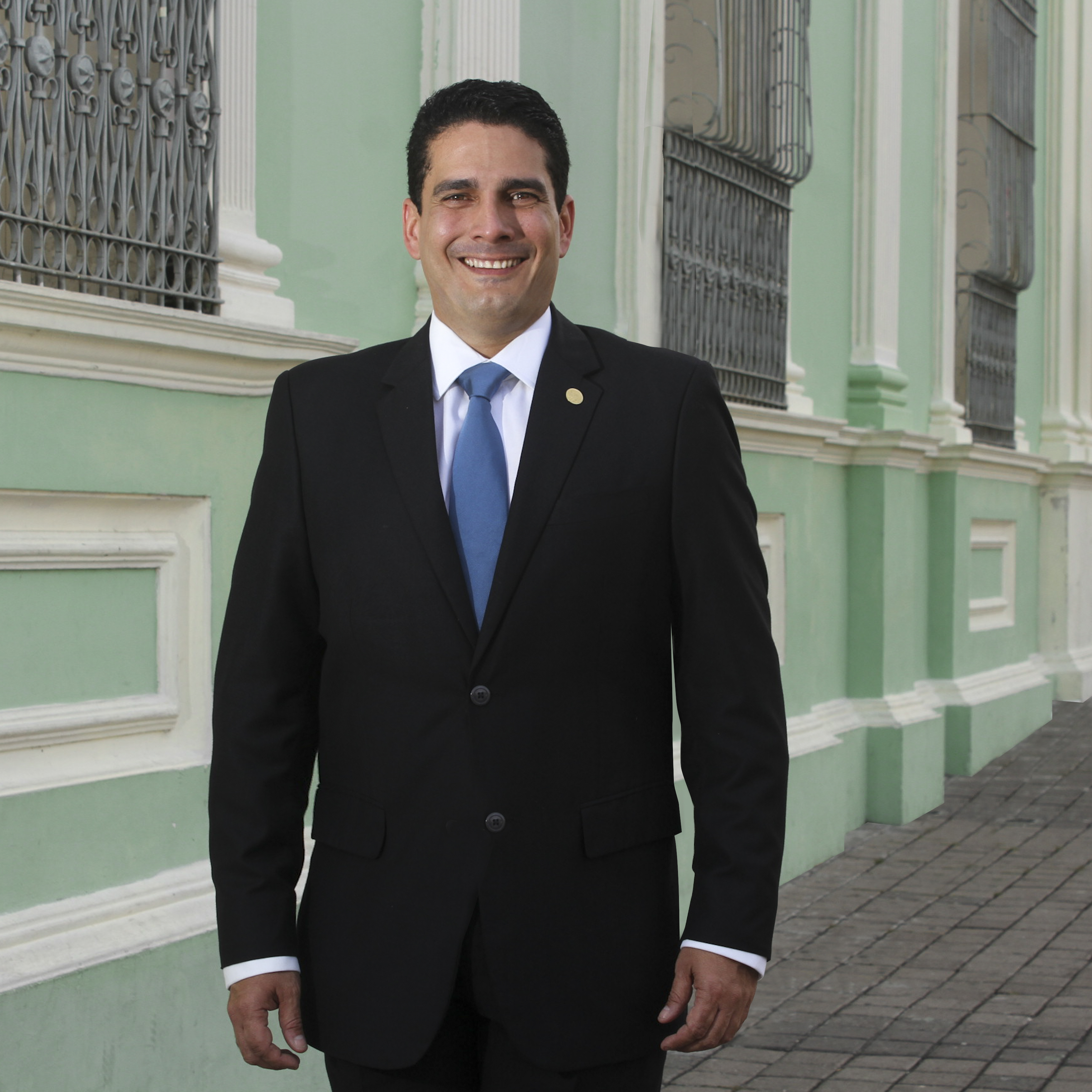

Mayor of Santa Tecla
- In office 1 May 2015 – 1 May 2021
- Preceded by: Óscar Ortiz
- Succeeded by: Henry Flores

Deputy of the Legislative Assembly of El Salvador from La Libertad
- In office 1 May 1997 – 1 May 2015

Personal details
- Born: Roberto José d'Aubuisson Munguía; 12 February 1968 (age 58) Santa Tecla, El Salvador
- Party: Nationalist Republican Alliance
- Spouse: Jackeline d'Aubuisson
- Children: 3
- Profession: Politician, businessman

Roberto José d'Aubuisson Munguía (born 12 February 1968) is a Salvadoran politician, and was the mayor of Santa Tecla from 2015 to 2021. D'Aubuisson was a member of the Salvadoran Legislative Assembly from 1997 to 2015. He was also a member of the National Executive Council (COENA) of Nationalist Republican Alliance (ARENA) from 2014 until 2016.

He is the son of Major Roberto D'Aubuisson, founder of ARENA, and Yolanda Olimpia Munguía Araujo. On 21 December 1990, he married his wife Jackeline, with whom he has three children.

== Early life ==
d'Aubuisson was raised a Roman Catholic. He attended Colegio San Francisco, graduating in 1986. He then attended José Matías Delgado University, where he majored in Agribusiness and received a master's in Engineering. d'Abuisson also studied in Israel from 1989 to 1990, at the International Workshop on Challenges in Agricultural Development Policies and Strategies. In April 2013 he attended a National Development Seminar offered by the Republic of China (Taiwan).

== Early political career ==
d'Aubuisson's political career began in 1986 as Departmental Director of the Youth Sector for the Department of San Salvador's ARENA Party. He served until 1988. He then served as National Director of the National Youth Sector of ARENA until 1999.

In 1991 d'Aubuisson was a member of the Municipal Board of San Salvador, and a Youth Sector Partner of the ARENA Party. In 1993, he was a member of the Coordinating Committee of Social Development at the Presidential House. In 1994, he was advisor to the office of Deputy Minister of Transport and was also a member of the Departmental Assembly Joint San Salvador ARENA Party.

== National Assembly of El Salvador ==
d'Aubuisson was deputy for the National District from 1997 to 2000. From 1998 and 2000 he was also the National Director of Youth Sector at ARENA. From 2003 through March 2015, he was deputy for the department of La Libertad and a member of the Joint Departmental Assembly of ARENA. From 2012 to 2015 he was deputy to the Legislative Assembly of El Salvador for the Department of La Libertad.

During his career as a deputy of the Legislative Assembly, d'Aubuisson was a member of several legislative committees:

1997–2000

- Legislation and Constitutional Issues
- Justice and Human Rights and Labor and Social Welfare

2000–2003

- Economy and Agriculture
- Public Works, Transport and Housing
- Youth, Sports and Recreation
- Sport and Recreation
- Health, Environment and Natural Resources

2003–2006

- Economy and Agriculture
- Public Works, Transport and Housing
- Youth, Sports and Recreation
- Sport and Recreation

2006–2009

- Economy and Agriculture
- Tourism, Youth and Sports
- Ad- Hoc Committee to Regulate Oil

2009–2012

- Economy and Agriculture
- Treasury and Budget
- Legislation and Constitutional Issues

2012–2015

- Economy and Agriculture
- Legislation and Constitutional Issues

d'Aubuisson was also Coordinator of the Parliamentary Group of ARENA from 2007 to 2008, and was Secretary of the Board of the Legislative Assembly from 2008 until 2012. He was later appointed Vice President of the Board of the Legislative Assembly from 2012 through 2014. d'Aubuisson has been involved in international organizations such as the ACYPL, (Salvadoran Chapter of the American Council of Young Political Leaders) a bipartisan American organization that promotes exchanges of young political leaders in more than 100 countries worldwide, with the goal of understanding between different political forces. The El Salvador chapter was founded under the name ACYPL, respecting the political vision of bringing together young people from different political parties in El Salvador. From 2000 to 2008 he served as vice president of the organization, and then as president from 2008 to 2010.

He has been honored by international figures such as George W. Bush, who in May 1999 named him a Guest of Honor of the State of Texas; as well as the Mayor Lee P. Brown of the City of Houston, Texas, who recognized him as an Honorary Citizen and Goodwill Ambassador.

== Mayor of Santa Tecla ==
In the 2015 elections for mayors and deputies, d'Aubuisson ran for the mayorship of Santa Tecla under the ARENA Party Flag, defeating the Frente Fabarundo Martí para la Liberación Nacional (FMLN) candidate Armando Flores. Currently the City Council is a plurality with the participation of ARENA and FMLN parties, with a majority of councillors representing ARENA.

On 1 May 2015, d'Aubuisson took office first term as Mayor of Santa Tecla. He pledged a commitment to improve the quality of life of the people of Santa Tecla. His government has focused on strengthening and optimizing areas such as health, sports, social welfare, the economy, culture, and tourism. The mayor and his municipal team have focused on developing comprehensive programs to address the needs of the people of Santa Tecla. These include the renovation and reopening of the municipal markets, spraying campaigns to eradicate the mosquito transmitting dengue, chikungunya and zika; acquired three new trucks to collect garbage conducting preventive cleaning on streets, sewers, and markets; patching damaged streets, and installing electric street lighting. In addition, it is promoting technological development in the public forums to better care for citizens. With Tecla App, a mobile application which was launched in late 2015, citizens can report any need for public services.

Support for sports is one of the cornerstones of the d'Aubuisson government. As part of promoting sports in the city, city hall has been working on improving green spaces such as El Cafetalón, and building new parks such as Adela Van Severen. These recreational areas offer classes and leagues for both men's and women's soccer and women, basketball, skating, karate, volleyball, and aerobics.

The d'Aubuisson government has also offered support for other sports such as American football, volleyball and baseball. Support has been given to local teams such as Santa Tecla Football Club of the First Football Division of El Salvador, Quequeisque FC of Second Football Division of El Salvador, Santa Tecla Basketball Club of the Major Basketball League of El Salvador, and the Santa Tecla Baseball Club of the Major League Baseball in El Salvador.

On 16 March 2026, a court in Santa Tecla convicted d'Aubuisson of illicit enrichment. It ordered him to pay $450,729.39 back to the state and banned him from holding political office for ten years.
