= Sigfrido Reyes Morales =

Salvadoran politician (born 1960)

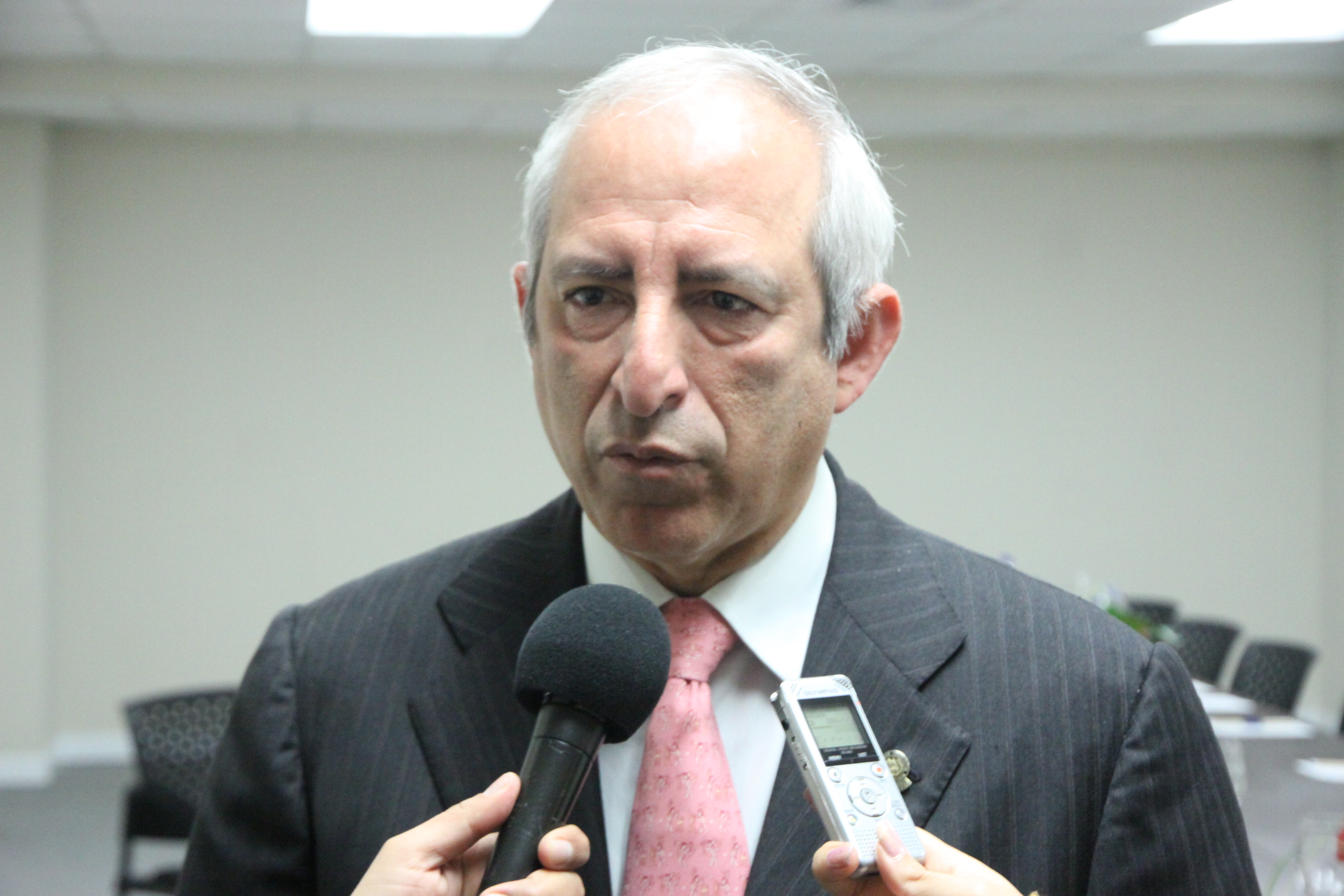
- Reyes in 2013

President of the Legislative Assembly of El Salvador
- In office 1 February 2011 – 1 May 2015
- Preceded by: Ciro Cruz Zepeda
- Succeeded by: Lorena Peña

Deputy of the Legislative Assembly of El Salvador from San Salvador
- In office 1 May 2006 – 1 May 2015

Deputy of the Central American Parliament
- In office 1 May 1996 – 1 May 2001

Personal details
- Born: Othon Sigfrido Reyes Morales; 3 September 1960 (age 66) San Salvador, El Salvador
- Party: Farabundo Martí National Liberation Front
- Other political affiliations: Communist Party of El Salvador
- Education: Instituto Nacional Francisco Menéndez; INCAE; Central American University; University of El Salvador
- Occupation: Politician

Othon Sigfrido Reyes Morales (born 3 September 1960), is a Salvadoran politician. He served as President of the Legislative Assembly of El Salvador from 2011 to 2015.

== Early life and education ==
He completed his undergraduate studies at the Instituto Nacional Francisco Menéndez, and 1978 was recognized as First Bachelor of the Republic of El Salvador. During the civil war, was part of the Communist Party of El Salvador. After the conflict, academic studies in various institutions such as INCAE and the Central American University. At the University of El Salvador, received a Bachelor's degree in Foreign Internacionales.

== Political career ==
As part of the political party Farabundo Martí National Liberation Front (FMLN), which is a founding member, has played diverter 2 positions including: Secretary of Communications of the FMLN National Council Member, Political and Diplomatic Commission of the FMLN, Deputy Central American Parliament period 1996 - 2001, and 2001 - 2006, Deputy Owner by the Department of San Salvador in El Salvador's Legislative Assembly, the period 2006 - 2009, and 2009 - 2011, where he was Senior Vice President of the Board.

Reyes became President of the Salvadoran Parliament February 1, 2011, following the modification of a "protocol of understanding" between the factions of the FMLN, GANA and PCN, which stipulated that Ciro Cruz Zepeda (PCN) give up the position.

In January 2020, a judge in El Salvador asked Interpol to issue a red note detention order for Sigfrido Reyes, the former president of the country’s congress, and three other people on corruption allegations.

The press office for the court in San Salvador confirmed the decision came after a hearing in the case of 14 people accused of laundering $6.5 million, defrauding the state in land purchases and appropriation of government funds. Sigfrido Reyes is currently a fugitive and his whereabouts are unknown.
