= 1999 Salvadoran presidential election =

1999 elections in El Salvador

← 1994	7 March 1999	2004 →
- Registered: 3,171,224
- Turnout: 38.57% (▼13.70pp)
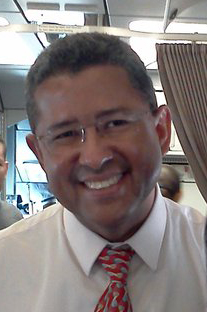
		FMLN
Nominee	Francisco Flores	Facundo Guardado
Party	ARENA	FMLN
Running mate	Carlos Quintanilla Schmidt	María Marta Valladares
Popular vote	614,268	343,472
Percentage	51.96%	29.05%
- Results by department
President before election
Armando Calderón Sol
ARENA
Elected President
Francisco Flores Pérez
ARENA

Presidential elections were held in El Salvador on 7 March 1999. The result was a victory for Francisco Flores of the Nationalist Republican Alliance, who won in the first round with 51.96% of the vote.

== Results ==
Candidate	Running mate	Party	Votes	%
Francisco Flores Pérez	Carlos Quintanilla Schmidt	Nationalist Republican Alliance	614,268	51.96
Facundo Guardado	María Marta Valladares	FMLN–USC	343,472	29.05
Rubén Zamora	Roberto Meza	United Democratic Centre	88,640	7.50
Rodolfo Parker	Donald Ricardo Calderón Lam	Christian Democratic Party	67,207	5.68
Hernán Contreras	Julio Eduardo Moreno Niños	National Conciliation Party	45,140	3.82
Salvador Nestor García	Mauricio Meyer	Democratic Republican League	19,269	1.63
Francisco Ayala de Paz	Humberto Merlos Hernández	Party of the United People and the New Deal	4,252	0.36
Total			1,182,248	100.00
Valid votes			1,182,248	96.65
Invalid/blank votes			40,967	3.35
Total votes			1,223,215	100.00
Registered voters/turnout			3,171,224	38.57
Source: TSE
