= 2009 Salvadoran legislative election =

- 18 January 2009
- All 84 seats in the Legislative Assembly; 43 seats needed for a majority
Party	Leader	Vote %	Seats	+/–
FMLN	Medardo González	42.60	35	+3
ARENA	Rodrigo Ávila	38.55	32	−2
PCN	Ciro Cruz Zepeda	8.79	11	+1
PDC	Rodolfo Parker	6.94	5	−1
CD	Héctor Dada Hirezi	2.12	1	−1
This lists parties that won seats. See the complete results below.
Results by constituency

Legislative elections were held in El Salvador on 18 January 2009. The leftist Farabundo Martí National Liberation Front (FMLN) was widely expected to win the most seats for the first time against the nationalist conservative Nationalist Republican Alliance (ARENA). As a result of the election, the Revolutionary Democratic Front, a left-wing party founded by FMLN dissidents in 2006 with the same name and symbols as the historic FDR from the Salvadoran Civil War, was deregistered as a political party as it failed to gain either a seat or 50,000 votes, as necessary to sustain registration. All parties contested the election in all departments, except for the FDR, which did not contest the election in three departments and stood jointly with the PDC in two others.

In San Isidro in Cabañas Department, voting had to be rescheduled to 25 January 2009 after a group of non-natives illegally attempted to vote.

== Results ==
Party	Votes	%	Seats	+/–
Farabundo Martí National Liberation Front	943,936	42.60	35	+3
Nationalist Republican Alliance	854,166	38.55	32	–2
National Conciliation Party	194,751	8.79	11	+1
Christian Democratic Party	153,654	6.94	5	–1
Democratic Change	46,971	2.12	1	–1
Revolutionary Democratic Front	22,111	1.00	0	New
Total	2,215,589	100.00	84	0
Valid votes	2,215,589	97.84		
Invalid/blank votes	48,978	2.16		
Total votes	2,264,567	100.00		
Registered voters/turnout	4,226,479	53.58		
Source: Election Resources
