= Parliamentary Group of the Left =

Political group in the Central American Parliament

Parliamentary Left Group Grupo Izquierda Parlamentaria
- Founded: 28 October 1991; 34 years ago
- Headquarters: Guatemala City
- Ideology: Socialism; Socialism of the 21st century Left-wing populism
- Political position: Left-wing
- Continental affiliation: São Paulo Forum
- Central American Parliament: 26 / 120

The Parliamentary Left Group is a left-wing political group in the Central American Parliament (PARLACEN). For the 2024–2025 session, the organization's president and vice-president are Franklin Santiago Benjamín White Coplin of the Dominican Republic and José Antonio Zepeda López of Nicaragua. It holds twenty-six seats in the Central American Parliament as of 2023.

== Members ==
| Country | Political party |
|---|---|
| Guatemala | Guatemalan National Revolutionary Unity |
| Guatemala | Winaq |
| El Salvador | Farabundo Martí National Liberation Front |
| Honduras | Liberty and Refoundation |
| Nicaragua | Sandinista National Liberation Front |
| Dominican Republic | Dominican Liberation Party |
| Dominican Republic | Modern Revolutionary Party |
| Panama | Democratic Revolutionary Party |

== See also ==
- Center-Democratic Integration Group
- Central American Parliament
