= Medardo González =

Salvadoran politician

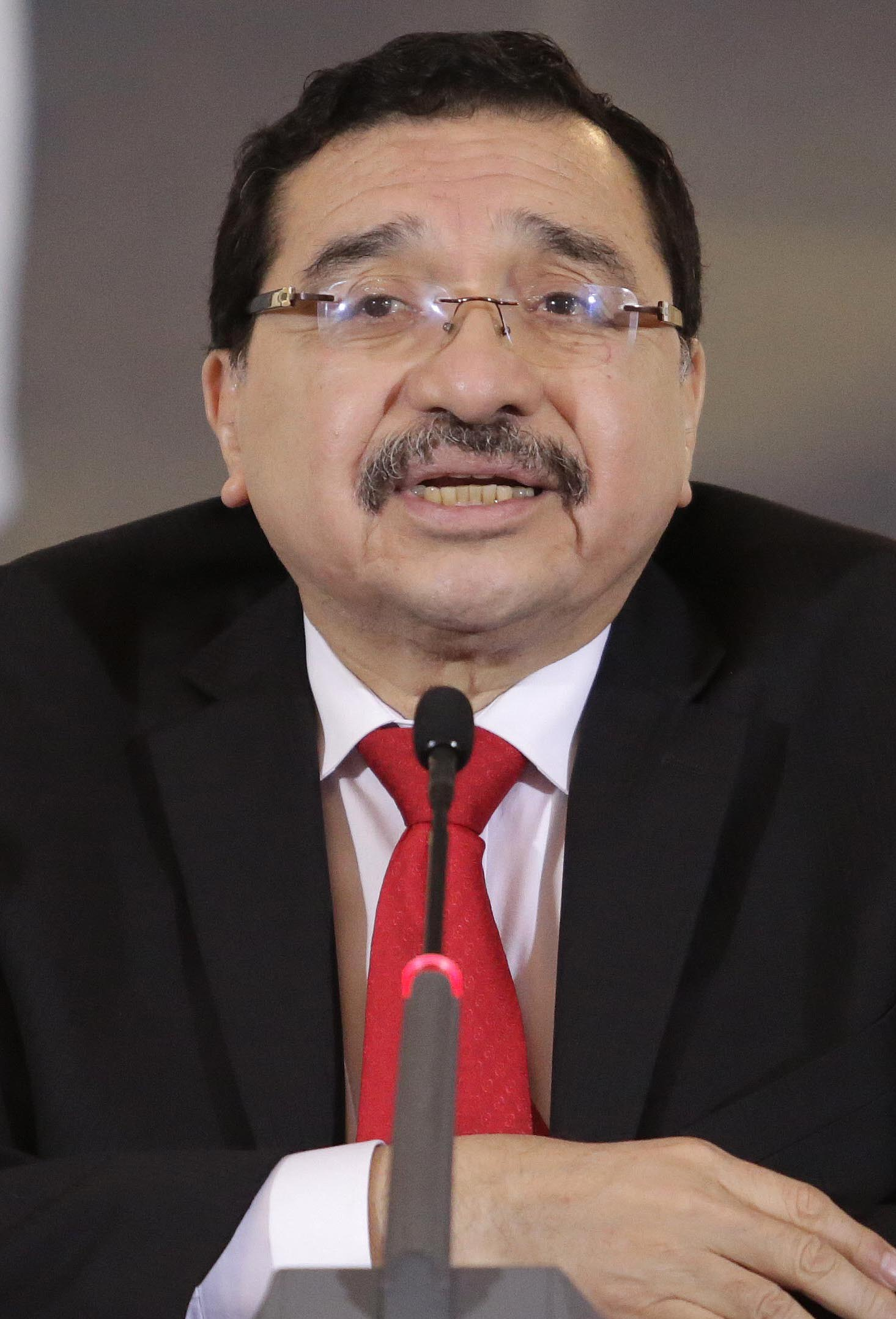

Deputy of the Legislative Assembly of El Salvador from San Miguel
- In office 1 May 2000 – 1 May 2003

Secretary General of the Farabundo Martí National Liberation Front
- In office 24 January 2006 – 7 July 2019
- Preceded by: Schafik Hándal
- Succeeded by: Óscar Ortiz

Personal details
- Born: Medardo González Trejo; 16 April 1952 (age 74) San Miguel, El Salvador
- Party: Farabundo Martí National Liberation Front
- Occupation: Politician, soldier
- Nickname: Commander Milton Méndez

Military service
- Allegiance: Farabundo Martí National Liberation Front
- Branch/service: Farabundo Martí Popular Liberation Forces
- Years of service: 1972–1992
- Battles/wars: Salvadoran Civil War

Medardo González Trejo (born 16 April 1952) is a Salvadoran politician. He was the secretary general of the Farabundo Martí National Liberation Front (FMLN) from 2004 to 2019. He served as a deputy in Legislative Assembly of El Salvador.

== Biography ==
In 1972, he joined the Farabundo Martí Popular Liberation Forces (FPL), one of the five armed organizations which formed the Farabundo Martí National Liberation Front (FMLN) in 1980. He adopted the pseudonym of Commander Milton Méndez. During the Salvadoran Civil War, he was a member of the Political Commission of the FPL, and commanded guerrilla units in the departments of San Vicente and Cabañas.

After the signing of the Peace Accords in 1992, the FMLN, was transformed into a political party. From 1993 to 2004, González was a member of the National Council of the FMLN.

In 2000, he was elected to the Legislative Assembly for a period of three years.

In November 2004 he was a candidate to general coordinator in the internal elections of the FMLN, with the backing of the historical leader Schafik Hándal, being elected with 62% of the votes, thus defeating the candidate Óscar Ortiz, identified with the reformist sectors match.

Party political offices
Preceded by Schafik Hándal	Secretary General of the Farabundo Martí National Liberation Front; 2006–2019	Succeeded by Óscar Ortiz
