= Revolutionary Democratic Front (2006) =

Political party in El Salvador

The Revolutionary Democratic Front (Spanish: Frente Democrático Revolucionario) is a populist political party in El Salvador. It was founded in 2006 as a rightwing split from the Farabundo Marti National Liberation Front. The party received 0.95% of the vote in the 18 January 2009 legislative election.
