= Democratic Change (El Salvador) =

Democratic Change Cambio Democrático
- Leader: Javier Milián
- Founded: 2005
- Headquarters: San Salvador
- Ideology: Social democracy Progressivism
- Political position: Centre-left
- International affiliation: COPPPAL
- Colours: Yellow and Blue
- Seats in the Legislative Assembly: 0 / 60
- Mayors: 0 / 44
- Central American Parliament: 0 / 20

Party flag

Website
- http://www.cambiodemocratico.com.sv/

Democratic Change (Spanish: Cambio Democrático) is a center-left political party in El Salvador. It was formed by former members of the Christian Democratic Party (PDC), Farabundo Martí National Liberation Front (FMLN), and United Democratic Center (CDU). It is a social Christian and social democratic in ideological orientation, incorporating what the party calls the "democratic left."

In the 12 March 2006 legislative election, the party won 3.1% of the popular vote and 2 out of 84 seats.

At the January 18, 2009 legislative elections, Democratic Change won 2.1% of the vote and 1 seat.

The party was controversially dissolved by the Supreme Electoral Tribunal (TSE) in July 2018 for failing to meet minimum seat and vote requirements in the 2015 Salvadoran legislative election, despite meeting those requirements in the following 2018 election. As of October 2019, the party has acquired the necessary signatures to be reregistered, and has begun the process with the TSE.

As Democratic Change failed to receive more than 50,000 votes in the 2024 election, the TSE began the process to deregister the party on 11 April 2024.

== Electoral history ==
=== Presidential elections ===
Election	Candidate	First round			Second round			Result
Election	Candidate	Votes	%	Pos.	Votes	%	Pos.	Result
2009	Did not run							
2014	Did not run							
2019	Did not run							
2024	Supported Nayib Bukele (NI)	2,701,725	84.65%	▲1st	—N/a			Won ✓

=== Legislative Assembly elections ===
View source data.

Election	Votes	%	Position	Seats	+/–	Status in legislature	Ref.
2006	61,022	3.05%	▲5th	2 / 84	▲2	Opposition	
2009	46,971	2.12%	5th	1 / 84	▼1	Opposition	
2012	47,747	2.12%	▼6th	1 / 84	0	Opposition	
2015	36,796	1.62%	▼7th	0 / 84	▼1	Extra-parliamentary	
2018	19,869	0.94%	▼10th	1 / 84	▲1	Opposition	
2021	14,768	0.56%	▲9th	0 / 84	▼1	Extra-parliamentary	
2024	12,165	0.39	▼10th	0 / 60	0	Extra-parliamentary	
