= Republican People's Party (El Salvador) =

Political party in El Salvador

The Republican People's Party (Spanish: Partido Popular Republicano) is a political party in El Salvador. It first contested national elections in 2003, when it won 1.6% of the vote, but failed to win a seat.
