= Renewal Movement =

The Renewal Movement (Spanish: Movimiento Renovador) was a communist political party in El Salvador. The Renovadores started as an organized internal tendency within the Farabundo Martí National Liberation Front (FMLN) around 1999, then split from the FMLN around 2002 when their principal leader, Facundo Guardado, was expelled from the FMLN. In the 2003 legislative elections the party received 1.9% of the vote, but failed to win a seat. They did not receive enough votes, according to Salvadoran law, to continue to exist as a legal electoral party.
