= El Salvador–Palestine relations =

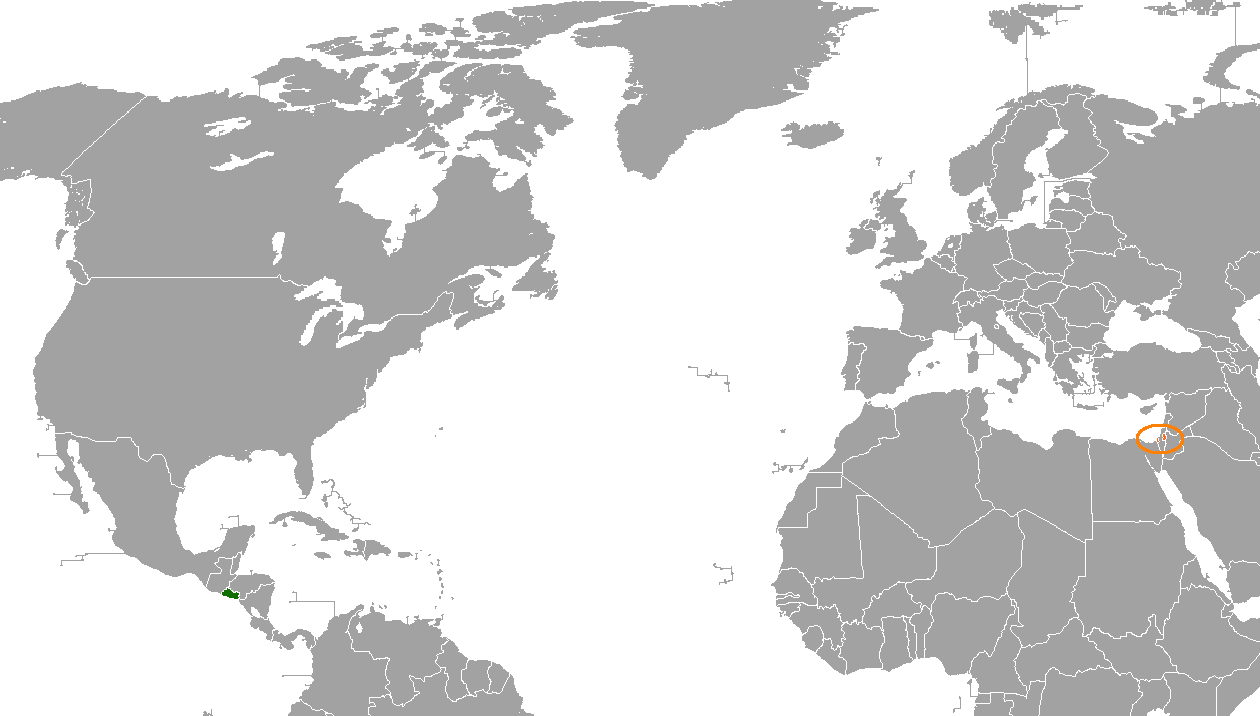

- El Salvador: Palestine

The Republic of El Salvador and the State of Palestine have enjoyed warm relations, the importance of which centers on the history of Palestinian migration to El Salvador. There are approximately 60,000–100,000 people of Palestinian origin in El Salvador.

== History ==
Between 1892 and 1918, over 90 Palestinians, primarily from Bethlehem, arrived to El Salvador and settled in the country. Many were escaping conscription into the Ottoman Army and World War I. Over time, more Palestinians would arrive to El Salvador and work in various industries in the country. In 1933, the Salvadoran government passed a law barring further immigration from Middle Eastern countries to El Salvador. In 1947, El Salvador abstained from voting in the United Nations Partition Plan for Palestine.

In May 2009, President Antonio Saca, a Salvadoran of Palestinian descent, paid a visit to the city of Bethlehem in Palestine. While there, President Saca stated that "Palestine must exist, but Israel must also have secure borders, that is the position that the country will continue to maintain with respect to the Palestinian people and the Jewish people." While in Bethlehem, President Saca met with Palestinian Prime Minister Salam Fayyad. During their meeting, both leaders discussed relations between both nations and Prime Minister Fayyad thanked President Saca for his country's decision of moving the Salvadoran embassy from Jerusalem to Tel Aviv in 2006. During his time in Bethlehem, President Saca met with the Salvadoran community residing in Palestine.

In October 2011, Palestinian President Mahmoud Abbas paid an official visit to El Salvador. While in El Salvador, President Abbas met with Salvadoran President Mauricio Funes. During their meeting's, President Funes stated: "We want to strengthen our relationship with Palestine ... and contribute to the reestablishment of talks between Palestine and Israel" President Funes officially recognized Palestine as an independent country. On 9 May 2013, El Salvador and Palestine established diplomatic relations with the visit of Palestinian Foreign Minister Riyad al-Maliki to El Salvador. In October 2018, Palestine opened a resident embassy in San Salvador and appointed an ambassador to El Salvador.

Nayib Bukele, of Palestinian origin, was elected as President of El Salvador in 2019. In 2023, following the October 7 attacks and the outbreak of the Gaza war, Bukele stated that "the best thing that could happen to the Palestinian people is for Hamas to completely disappear", emphasizing they do not represent the Palestinian people.

== Diplomatic missions ==
- El Salvador is accredited to Palestine from its embassy in Tel Aviv, Israel and maintains an honorary consulate in Bethlehem.
- Palestine has an embassy in San Salvador.

== See also ==
- Foreign relations of El Salvador
- Foreign relations of Palestine
- Palestinian Salvadoran
