= Christian Force =

Salvadoran political party

Christian Force (Spanish: Fuerza Cristiana) is a political party in El Salvador. It first contested national elections in 2003, when it received 1.1% of the vote, but failed to win a seat.
