= United Democratic Centre (El Salvador) =

Political party in El Salvador

The United Democratic Centre (Spanish: Centro Democrático Unido) is a political party in El Salvador.

It first contested national elections in 1999 when it nominated Rubén Zamora (who finished third) in the presidential elections. For the 2000 elections it was an alliance of the Social Democratic Party and Democratic Convergence, winning three seats. Although the 2003 elections saw the Social Democratic Party run separately, the CDU increased its representation to five seats. In the 2004 presidential elections its candidate Héctor Silva Argüello received 3.9% of the vote. However, it lost all its seats in the 2006 elections.
