= Schafik Hándal =

Salvadoran politician and guerrilla leader (1930–2006)

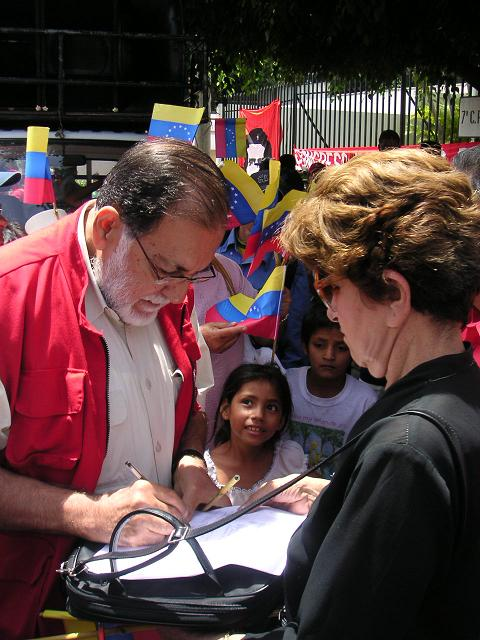
- Schafik Hándal

Deputy of the Legislative Assembly of El Salvador
- In office 1 February 1997 – 24 January 2006

Personal details
- Born: October 14, 1930 Usulután, El Salvador
- Died: January 24, 2006 (aged 75) San Salvador, El Salvador
- Resting place: Cemetery of Distinguished Citizens
- Party: Communist Party of El Salvador; Farabundo Martí National Liberation Front
- Children: Jorge Shafik Hándal Vega
- Website: http://www.fmln.org.sv/

Schafik Jorge Hándal Hándal (Arabic: شفيق جورج حنضل; October 14, 1930 – January 24, 2006) was a Salvadoran politician.

== Biography ==
Born in Usulután, he was the son of Palestinian Christian immigrants from the town of Bethlehem.

Between 1973 and 1994, he was the general secretary of the Communist Party of El Salvador (PCES). As General Secretary of the PCES, Hándal embraced elections and rejected armed struggle to conquer political power in El Salvador. Later on, after two allegedly fraudulent elections in 1972 and in 1977, and despite the intervention of the Communist Party of Cuba (History of the FMLN, newspaper "Frente"), Handal became convinced that the defeat of the military dictatorship would not be possible through elections. As a guerrilla leader in the late 1970s and early 1980s, he was a member of the group that brought five opposition forces together to found the Farabundo Martí National Liberation Front (FMLN) movement.

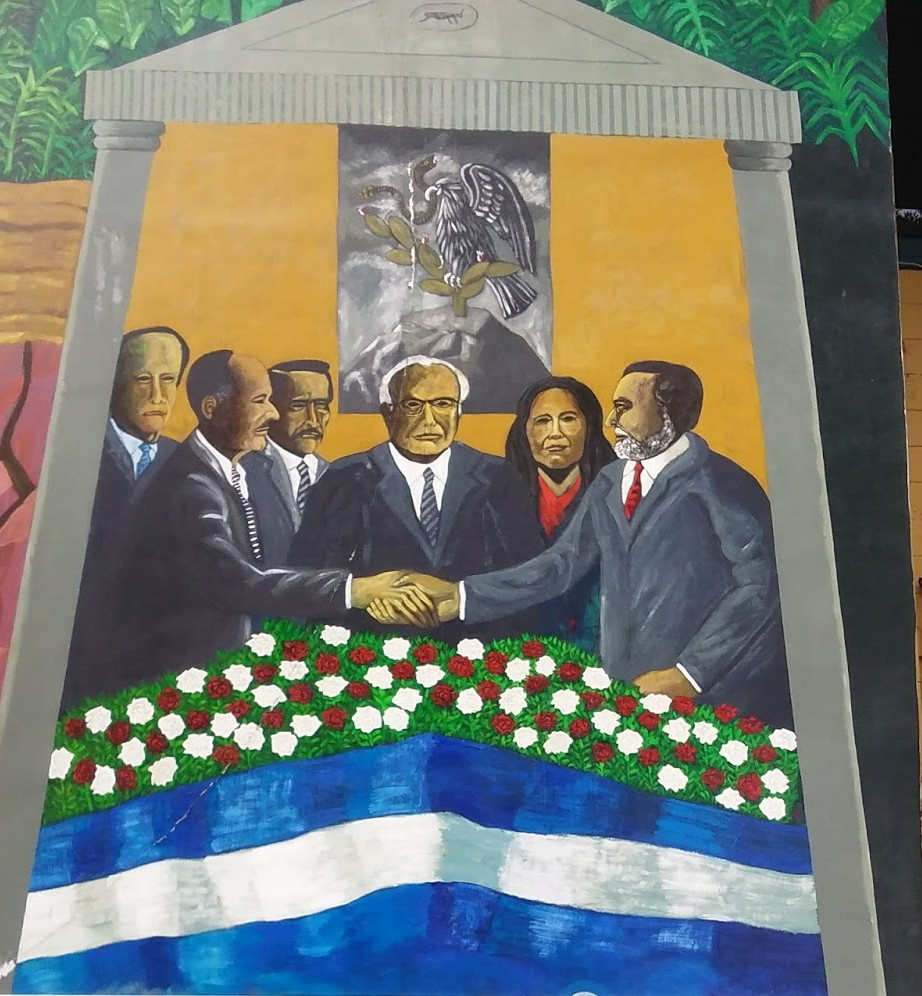
Mural of the peace agreement located on the national museum in San Salvador; in the image the guerilla leader Schafik Handal leader of the FMLN and the president of El Salvador Alfredo Cristiani shaking hands.

Following the signing of the Chapultepec Peace Accords in 1992, the FMLN converted itself from a guerrilla army into a political party, and Hándal served as its general coordinator. In 1997, he was elected to the Legislative Assembly, serving as the leader of the FMLN's party bloc in the legislature.

=== 2004 presidential elections ===
He was the FMLN's candidate in El Salvador's 2004 presidential election, held on March 21, running on a leftist platform that called for a friendly relationship with the United States (according to his own pamphlet for the campaign), renegotiation of free trade treaties and a closer relationship with socialist-oriented countries in Latin America, including Cuba, Venezuela and more liberal Brazil. Opponents accused Handal of exploiting anti-American sentiment while FMLN supporters accused the United States of corrupting the electoral process, because several high-ranking U.S. officials stated that American relations with El Salvador would be seriously threatened if Handal won the elections. Hándal was defeated by the candidate of the ruling conservative Nationalist Republican Alliance (ARENA), Antonio Saca, who was also of Palestinian descent, by a margin of 58 percent to 36 percent. The election saw a turnout of 70 percent at the polls.

== Death ==
Hándal died less than two years after his failed presidential bid, on January 24, 2006, of a heart attack. He fainted at Comalapa Airport upon his return from Bolivia where he had attended the inauguration ceremony of President Evo Morales; he was flown by helicopter to a San Salvador hospital but doctors were unable to revive him.

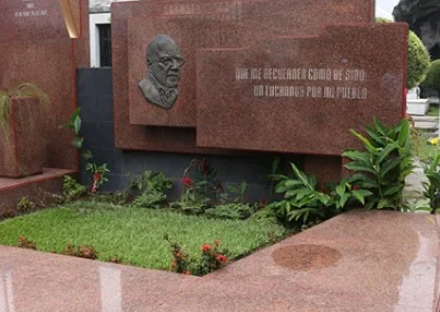
Grave of Shafik Handal

Hándal was buried at the Cemetery of Distinguished Citizens (Spanish, Cementerio de los Ilustres) in San Salvador.

== Awards and honors ==
In a ceremony held at the Universidad de El Salvador on January 16, 2004, he received the honorary title of Professor of Political Science from the Universidad Autónoma de Santo Domingo, Dominican Republic.

Posthumously, he was declared "Meritorious Son of the City of San Salvador" by the Mayor of San Salvador Carlos Rivas Zamora, and deputies of the PARLACEN granted him an acknowledgement of "Central American Merit Honor". The Permanent Commission of Political Parties of Latin America (COPPPAL) induced him posthumously with the order "Luis Donaldo Colosio". In this connection, it should also be mentioned that on 27 January 2006, the General University Assembly of the University of El Salvador agreed to propose to the Higher University Council of that same university that the "Doctorate Honoris Causa Post Mortem" be awarded to Schafik Hándal, who approved that recommendation on 6 April 2006. 69 The posthumous awarding ceremony of this honorary title, together with a medal of honor, took place on September 19, 2006, at the Cine Teatro of that educational center, being received by Jorge Schafik Hándal Vega, son of Schafik Hándal, from the hands of Dr. María Isabel Rodríguez, who at that time was the rector of that institution of higher education.

The auxiliary Catholic bishop of San Salvador, Monsignor Gregorio Rosa Chávez, said that Hándal was the greatest politician of the country in the 20th century. The President of Venezuela, Hugo Chávez, was one of the Latin American leaders who most grieved over the death of Hándal, who considered him a great revolutionary.

Party political offices
Preceded by Facundo Guardado (1999)	FMLN nominee for President of El Salvador; 2004	Succeeded by Mauricio Funes (2009)
