= Farabundo Martí National Liberation Front =

Salvadoran political party and former guerilla organization

Farabundo Martí National Liberation Front Frente Farabundo Martí para la Liberación Nacional
- Abbreviation: FMLN
- Secretary-General: Manuel Flores
- Deputy Secretary-General: Marleni Funes
- Founded: 10 October 1980; 46 years ago
- Registered: 14 December 1992; 33 years ago
- Legalized: 30 June 1992; 34 years ago
- Merger of: FPL; ERP; FARN; FAL/PCES; PRTC
- Preceded by: Unified Revolutionary Directorate
- Headquarters: 27 Poniente Street No. 1316 Colonia Layco, San Salvador, El Salvador
- Youth wing: FMLN Youth
- Membership (2024): c. 16,000
- Ideology: Democratic socialism; Liberation theology; Left-wing populism; Historically: Marxism–Leninism (until 1991)
- Political position: Left-wing to far-left; Historically: Far-left
- Regional affiliation: Parliamentary Group of the Left
- Continental affiliation: São Paulo Forum; COPPPAL
- Colors: Red, white
- Anthem: "Himno del FMLN" ("Anthem of the FMLN")
- Seats in the Legislative Assembly: 0 / 60
- Municipalities: 0 / 44
- Seats in PARLACEN: 2 / 20

Party flag

Website
- fmln.org.sv

The Farabundo Martí National Liberation Front (Spanish: Frente Farabundo Martí para la Liberación Nacional, abbreviated FMLN) is a Salvadoran left-wing political party and former guerrilla rebel group.

The FMLN was established on 10 October 1980 as the merged of four leftist guerrilla groups: the Farabundo Martí Popular Liberation Forces (FPL), the People's Revolutionary Army (ERP), the National Resistance Armed Forces (FARN), and the Armed Liberation Forces/Communist Party of El Salvador (FAL/PCES); the Revolutionary Party of the Central American Workers (PRTC) joined in December 1980. In 1981, the FMLN joined forces with the Revolutionary Democratic Front (FDR) coalition of mass organizations and were sometimes collectively referred to as the FMLN–FDR. The FMLN fought against the Salvadoran government during the country's civil war that lasted from 1979 to 1992. The FMLN launched three major offensives against the government in 1981, 1982, and 1989. The group signed the Chapultepec Peace Accords with the government that ended the civil war. As a part of the peace accords, the FMLN was demobilized and registered as a political party.

For three decades from the mid 1990s to the late 2010s, the FMLN dominated Salvadoran politics in a two-party system alongside the right-wing Nationalist Republican Alliance (ARENA). The party often finished in first or second place in the country's legislative and municipal elections. The FMLN lost the first three presidential elections it participated in, when it nominated various former civil war commanders. The party won the 2009 presidential election when it nominated journalist Mauricio Funes for President. Funes was succeeded in 2014 by Vice President Salvador Sánchez Cerén, a former guerrilla commander who narrowly won the 2014 presidential election. The FMLN lost the next two presidential elections, and after the 2024 election, it lost all its seats in the Legislative Assembly. Throughout the FMLN's history as a political party, several splinter parties have emerged from it such as the Democratic Party, Renewal Movement, and the Revolutionary Democratic Front (unrelated to the civil war-era group).

The FMLN is El Salvador's largest left-wing political party. During the civil war, the FMLN espoused Marxism–Leninism but moderated its position between 1989 and 1991 to embrace democratic socialism. The FMLN is a member of the Parliamentary Group of the Left political faction in the Central American Parliament. It is also a member of the São Paulo Forum and COPPPAL, two alliances of leftist Latin American political parties. Manuel Flores, the FMLN's 2024 presidential candidate and a former legislator, has served as the party's secretary-general since August 2024. As of 2024, the FMLN has around 16,000 members. In recent years, it has received criticism from leftist voters for corruption and perception of being out of touch with its base, as well as seeing a collapse in legislative seats during the 2024 legislative election.

== History ==
=== Background ===
==== Splintering of leftist groups during the 1970s ====
The Communist Party of El Salvador (PCES) was established in the 1930. In 1970, PCES general-secretary Cayetano Carpio split from the party and founded the Farabundo Martí Popular Liberation Forces (FPL) as he viewed the party's reliance on the electoral process to transform El Salvador as futile; he instead called for a "prolonged popular war" modeled on the Viet Cong to overthrow the military dictatorship that had ruled El Salvador since 1931. In 1971, the People's Revolutionary Army (ERP), led by Joaquín Villalobos, was established by dissidents of the PCES, FPL, and Christian Democratic Party (PDC). Villalobos called for a popular insurrection modeled on the Sandinista National Liberation Front (FSLN).

Throughout the 1970s, the FPL and ERP carried out hit-and-run attacks against the Salvadoran government, and allied mass organizations organized protests and strikes to create conditions that would start a revolution. In 1975, José Sancho established the National Resistance Armed Forces (FARN) as a splinter group from the ERP after Villalobos ordered the assassination of Roque Dalton—the leader of the ERP's political wing. In 1977, PCES and FARN dissidents led by Francisco Jovel created the Revolutionary Party of the Central American Workers (PRTC). In 1979, Schafik Hándal, Carpio's successor as PCES general-secretary, established the Armed Liberation Forces (FAL) as the PCES's militant wing after the party adopted an "armed struggle" doctrine under Hándal's leadership.

On 15 October 1979, the reformist elements of the Armed Forces of El Salvador (FAES) overthrew General Carlos Humberto Romero, the president of El Salvador, in a coup d'état and established the civil-military Revolutionary Government Junta (JRG). Some leftist groups such as the PCES initially supported the JRG while others such as the ERP opposed it and renewed calls for an insurrection. Eventually, negotiations between the JRG and some communist groups fell apart after Colonel Adolfo Arnoldo Majano lost his influence in the JRG and the junta itself being unable to curb violence by far-right death squads.

==== Negotiations and unification ====
In December 1979, Salvadoran leftist leaders met in Havana, Cuba to negotiate the establishment of a united coalition to oppose the JRG. They viewed the FSLN's victory in the Nicaraguan Revolution as a sign that they needed to set aside ideological differences and create a united vanguard to launch a successful revolution. Cuban leader Fidel Castro personally took part in the negotiations. In May 1980, the FPL, FARN, and FAL/PCES established the Unified Revolutionary Directorate (DRU) as a united coalition for political and military planning. DRU initially excluded the ERP due to lingering animosity over Dalton's assassination, but it later allowed the ERP to join following pressure from Castro.

On 10 October 1980, the DRU established the Farabundo Martí National Liberation Front (FMLN), a merger of the DRU's members and the Revolutionary Democratic Front (FDR), a coalition of the DRU member's affiliated mass organizations. The FMLN and FDR were sometimes referred to collectively as the Farabundo Martí National Liberation Front–Revolutionary Democratic Front (FMLN–FDR). The FMLN was an umbrella group consisting of the DRU groups as its militant wing and the FDR as its political front. The FMLN was named after Farabundo Martí, a peasant and communist leader who led a rebellion against the government of Brigadier General Maximiliano Hernández Martínez in 1932 and was executed during subsequent reprisal killings known as La Matanza that killed up to 40,000 people. The PRTC later joined the FMLN in December 1980. The FMLN was governed by five-member executive directorate that consisted of the Salvador Sánchez Cerén (representing the FPL), Villalobos (ERP), Sancho (FARN), Hándal (FAL/PCES), and Jovel (PRTC).

=== Guerrilla coalition (1980–1992) ===
==== Early military offensives (1980–1983) ====
The FMLN launched its first military offensive—known as the final offensive of 1981—on 10 January 1981 when it carried out 43 attacks against various government and military positions including the Ilopango International Airport and the headquarters of the Treasury Police. Carpio issued FMLN General Order Number 1 that called on the Salvadoran people to join the FMLN in a national uprising. Although the FMLN had captured 82 cities and villages, mostly in northern El Salvador, by 17 January, the JRG launched a counteroffensive and Hándal called for a "temporary tactical retreat". By 26 January, the offensive failed and the FMLN acknowledged that it did not spark the national uprising it hoped for. Although the offensive failed, the FMLN proved itself to be a competent fighting force and retained control of some territory.

On 28 March 1982, the date of the 1982 Constitutional Assembly election, the FMLN launched the general offensive of 1982 that intended to disrupt the election's conduct, but the offensive failed to achieve this goal and all 60 seats on the Constitutional Assembly were decided. That year, many FMLN leaders believed that a negotiated settlement was the best way to obtain their goals, but this approach was strongly rejected by Carpio who described it as a betrayal of the revolution. In January 1983, the FPL Central Committee voted Carpio out of power and replaced him with Mélida Anaya Montes. In April 1983, Carpio had Montes assassinated in Managua, Nicaragua and he committed suicide days later when the assassins were captured.

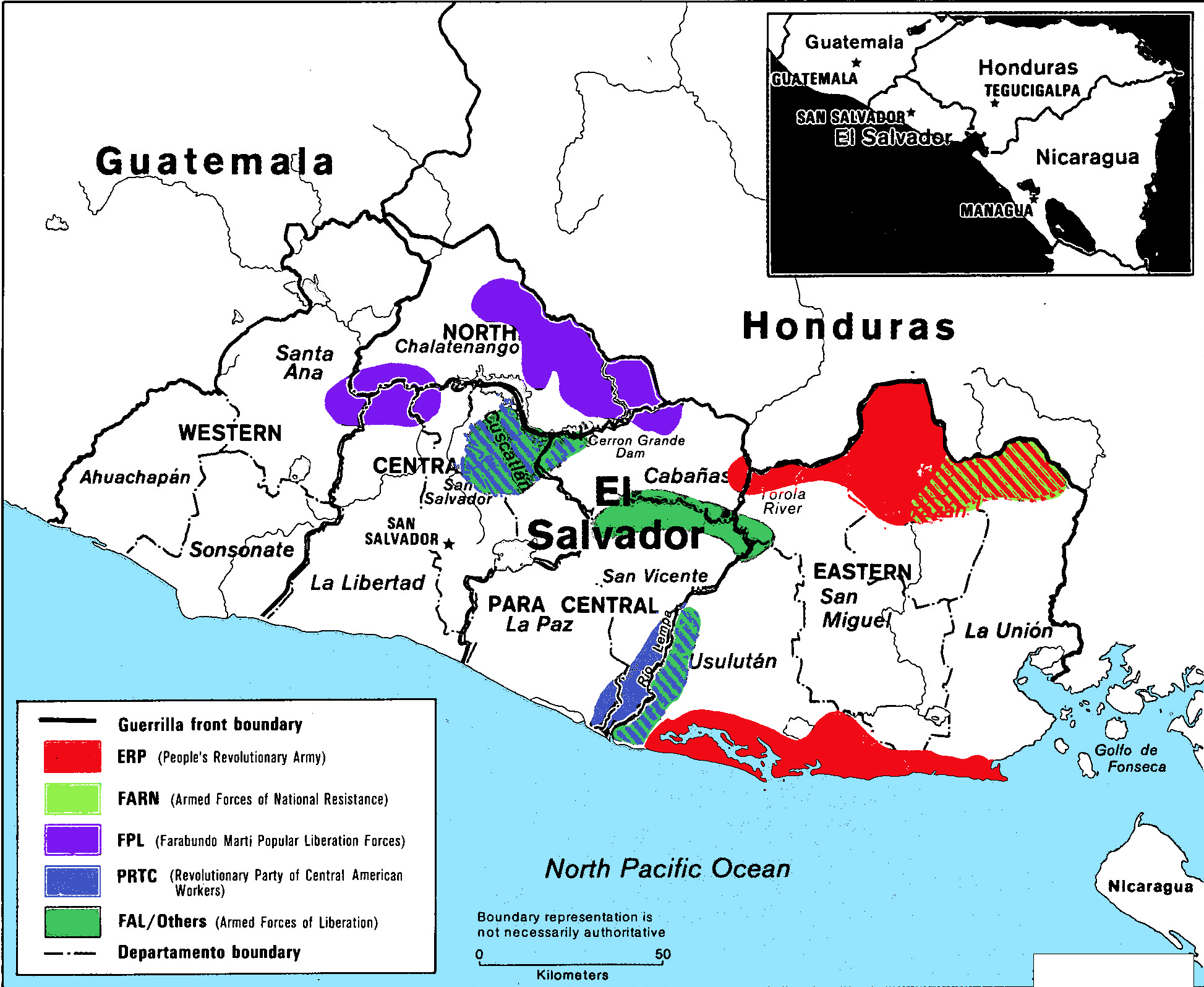
Map of FMLN members' controlled territories and five fronts during the civil war

Carpio's suicide diminished the FPL's influence within the FMLN and the coalition's members moved towards further cooperation with each other led by the ERP. The FMLN divided its forces into five fronts: the Feliciano Ama Western Front (in Ahuachapán, La Libertad, Santa Ana, and Sonsonate), the Anastasio Aquino Para-Central Front (in San Vicente and parts of Cabañas and La Paz), the Modesto Ramírez Central Front (in Cuscatlán, San Salvador, and parts of Cabañas and La Paz), the Francisco Sánchez Eastern Front (in La Unión, Morazán, San Miguel, and Usulután), and the Apolinario Serrano Northern Front (in Chalatenango).

==== Peace negotiations (1983–1989) ====
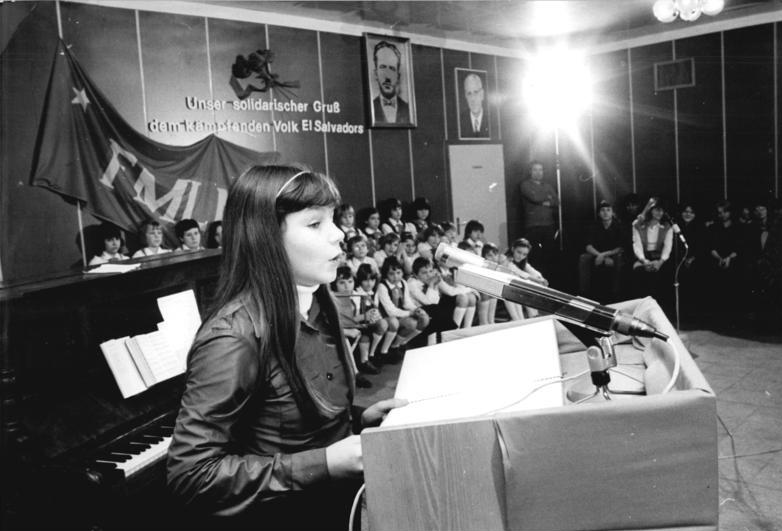
A 1982 FMLN solidarity meeting in Halle (Saale), East Germany

Carpio's death also led to the FMLN approaching the Salvadoran government to enter negotiations ahead of the 1984 presidential election in the hopes of joining a coalition government. In 1983, the FMLN entered private negotiations with the government of President Álvaro Magaña. After the 1984 election, the FMLN entered open negotiations with the PDC government of President José Napoleón Duarte. The FMLN and Duarte's government held several meetings between 1984 and 1988 but were unable to come to an agreement to end the civil war due to continued FMLN attacks.

While in negotiations, the FMLN continued to carry out hit-and-run attacks against the government including assassinations, kidnappings, and bombings. FMLN militants particularly attacked American military personnel as the United States was supporting the Salvadoran government with weapons, supplies, and advisors. The FMLN also destroyed infrastructure, blockaded public transportation, and imposed "war taxes" on businesses (such as kidnappings and bombings) that cost the Salvadoran government US$2 billion between 1979 and 1988.

Throughout the civil war, Cuba trained hundreds of FMLN personnel and Nicaragua subsidized the FMLN's operation of Radio Venceremos, the group's clandestine radio station. There were unsubstantiated rumors during the civil war of direct support from the Soviet Union such as an alleged sighting of a Soviet submarine near La Unión or a Soviet soldier in Chalatenango. The FMLN received materiel support from communist countries such as Bulgaria, Czechoslovakia, East Germany, Ethiopia, Hungary, the Soviet Union, and Vietnam, much of which was sent to the FMLN through Nicaragua. The FMLN also received financial support from sympathetic solidarity committees in the United States, Mexico, and Europe. FMLN membership varied throughout the civil war: it was as low as 4,000 members in 1981 to as high as 15,000 members in 1991.

In December 1987, Rubén Zamora and Guillermo Ungo, two FDR leaders, announced the creation of Democratic Convergence (CVD), a left-wing political party formed from the merger of the Popular Social Christian Movement (MPSC), the National Revolutionary Movement (MNR), and the Social Democratic Party (PSD). The CVD was allowed to participate in the 1989 presidential election with Ungo as its presidential candidate, and the CVD's electoral participation was approved by the FMLN. Ungo finished in fourth place with 3.8 percent of the vote.

==== Last offensive and peace accords (1989–1992) ====
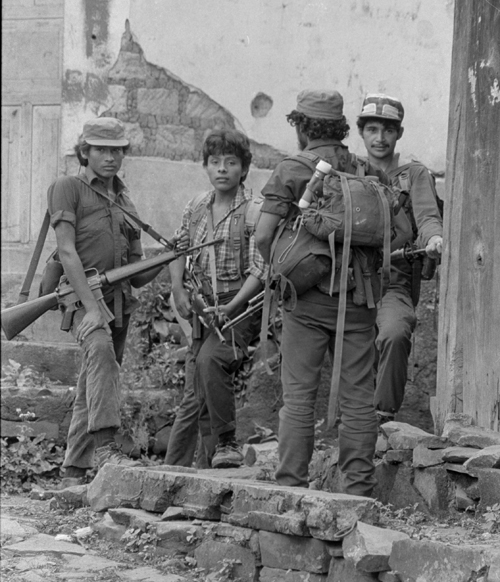
ERP combatants in Perquín in 1990

Duarte was succeeded by Alfredo Cristiani of the right-wing Nationalist Republican Alliance (ARENA), the winner of the 1989 election. Cristiani was more moderate than ARENA's previous nominee, Major Roberto D'Aubuisson, and was open to continuing negotiations because he believed that FAES was unable to induce a decisive victory against the FMLN to end the civil war. In November 1989, the FMLN launched the final offensive of 1989 in a bid to overthrow Cristiani's government and ignite a popular uprising, but once again the offensive failed and the popular uprising did not materialize. Although the FMLN was weakened by the military defeat together with the FSLN's electoral defeat in the 1990 Nicaraguan general election, the United States Congress voted to reduce funding to the Salvadoran government which also put it in a weaker position. In April 1990, the FMLN and Cristiani's government resumed peace negotiations mediated by the United Nations. Additionally, by 1991, the FMLN abandoned Marxism–Leninism in favor of democratic socialism as the group received diplomatic support from European and Latin American social democratic governments that pressured it to negotiate peace.

On 16 January 1992, the FMLN and Salvadoran government signed the Chapultepec Peace Accords that ended the civil war. The peace accords implemented various political and military reforms within the Salvadoran government. In exchange, the FMLN agreed to demobilize, being subsequently legalized as a political party. According to the 1990s Truth Commission for El Salvador, around 5 percent of human rights abuses during the civil war were committed by the FMLN, in contrast to 85 percent committed by the government. According to the University of Pittsburgh's Mitchell A. Seligson and Vincent McElhinny, between 58,382 and 92,823 people were killed during the civil war, of whom, between 12,274 and 23,840 were FMLN combatants.

=== Political party (1992–present) ===
==== Transition to a political party (1992–1994) ====
On 30 June 1992, the Legislative Assembly formally legalized the FMLN, and on 14 December, the Supreme Electoral Court (TSE) registered the FMLN as a political party. Although the FMLN was now a registered political party, its now-demobilized component militant groups continued to exist. The ERP (rebranded as the Renewed Expression of the People) and FARN wanted to moderate the FMLN and move it towards social democracy. Conversely, the FPL and PCES criticized those who wanted to moderate the FMLN, and PCES member Dagoberto Gutiérrez argued that the FMLN should continue the civil war but as an opposition political party.

Ahead of the 1994 general election, the first election held after the end of the civil war, the ERP and FARN proposed that the party should nominate a center-right reformist politician for president, but the FPL, PCES, and PRTC rejected this and instead nominated Zamora with Francisco Roberto Lima as his running mate. (Note: Rubén Zamora's 1994 presidential candidacy was a part of a coalition between the FMLN, Democratic Convergence, and the Revolutionary National Movement.) Zamora advanced to the second round where he lost to ARENA's Armando Calderón Sol with 31.7 percent of the vote. The FMLN also won 21 of 84 seats in the Legislative Assembly (surpassing the PDC as the legislature's second largest political party),15 of 262 municipalities, and 4 of El Salvador's 20 seats in the Central American Parliament (PARLACEN). The FMLN was most successful in territories it controlled during the civil war.

==== In opposition and political splits (1994–2009) ====
The FMLN's elected officials assumed office in May 1994. The FMLN's legislators affiliated with the ERP and FARN voted in favor of ARENA's national budget resulting in the party suspending their membership. The ERP and FARN also wanted to dissolve the FMLN's five lingering factions, but the FPL, PCES, and PRTC rejected this. In December, 7 legislators and 14 mayors affiliated with the ERP and FARN left the FMLN and later founded the Democratic Party (PD) in March 1995. That same year, the FPL, PCES, and PRTC dissolved and fully merged into the FMLN.

In the 1997 legislative and municipal elections, the FMLN won 27 seats in the Legislative Assembly and 49 municipalities. San Salvador, El Salvador's capital city, was among the FMLN's municipal victories. Meanwhile, the PD lost all its seats and was deregistered by the Supreme Electoral Court (TSE) for its poor performance, and the FMLN recuperated the seats that it had lost when the PD split from it. Ahead of the 1999 presidential election, FMLN leaders such as Hándal and Sánchez Cerén wanted to maintain the party's "orthodox" revolutionary socialist identity while leaders such as Jovel, Facundo Guardado, and Raúl Mijango wanted to make the party resemble European parties that supported social democracy. Jovel, Guardado, and Mijango represented the party's Renewal Movement (MR). The party ultimately nominated Guardado (Note: Facundo Guardado's 1999 presidential candidacy was a part of a coalition between the FMLN and the Social Christian Union.) and he finished in second behind ARENA's Francisco Flores Pérez with 29 percent of the vote. In the 2000 legislative election, the FMLN became the legislature's largest party winning 31 seats.

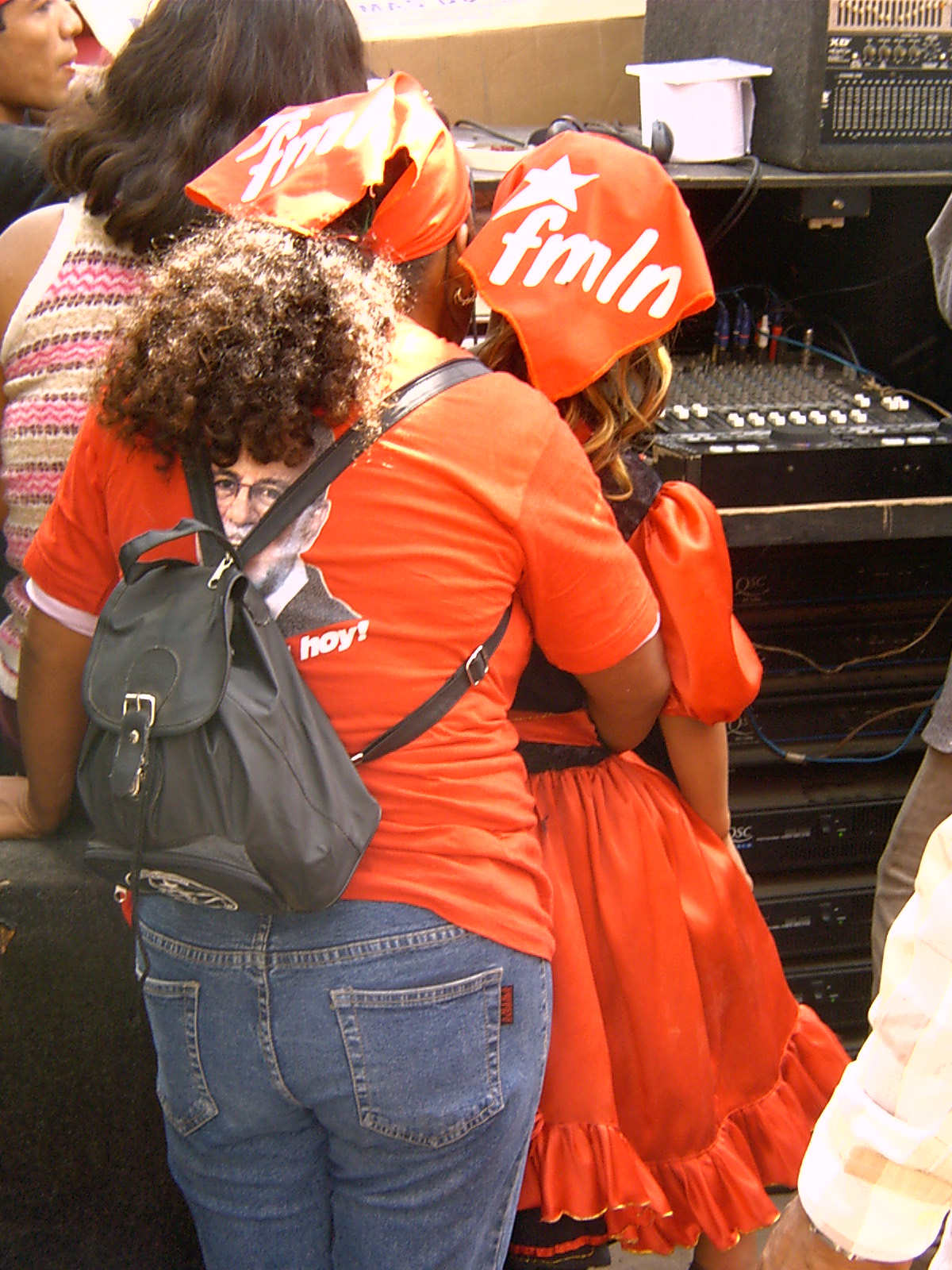
A woman at an FMLN 2004 presidential campaign rally

The FMLN held a party convention in May 2001 to hold its internal leadership election, but Guardado and Jovel boycotted the revolutionary socialist-dominated convention and held their own rival convention to get social democrats elected to party leadership positions. For this, the FMLN expelled both from the party in October. In March 2002, they and five FMLN legislators registered the Renewal Movement as a political party with the TSE. At the 2003 legislative election, the FMLN won 31 seats in the Legislative Assembly while the MR failed to surpass the 3 percent threshold as had its party registration canceled by the TSE.

Ahead of the 2004 presidential election, Hándal vetoed the pre-candidacy of journalist Mauricio Funes as he was not a historic FMLN member and defeated reformist Óscar Ortiz in the primary election. Hándal lost the presidential election to ARENA's Antonio Saca with 35.7 percent of the vote. The revolutionary socialists winning the FMLN's 2004 internal leadership election led to another split in the party. In June 2005, 7 FMLN legislators left the party and formed the Revolutionary Democratic Front (FDR, no relation to the civil war-era organization). In the 2006 legislative election, the FDR lost all its seats in the Legislative Assembly while the FMLN won 32 seats.

Ahead of the 2009 elections, Ortiz proposed Funes as the FMLN's presidential candidate. The party's leadership accepted Funes' candidacy on the condition that Sánchez Cerén was his running mate. Critics such as ARENA's candidate, Rodrigo Ávila, claimed that Sánchez Cerén would be the power behind the throne and that Funes would be little more than a puppet. The FMLN won 35 seats in the January legislative election; Funes won the presidential election two months later with 51.3 percent of the vote. Funes' victory coincided with the Latin American pink tide. The FDR performed poorly in the same election and was deregistered by the TSE.

==== Control of the presidency (2009–2019) ====
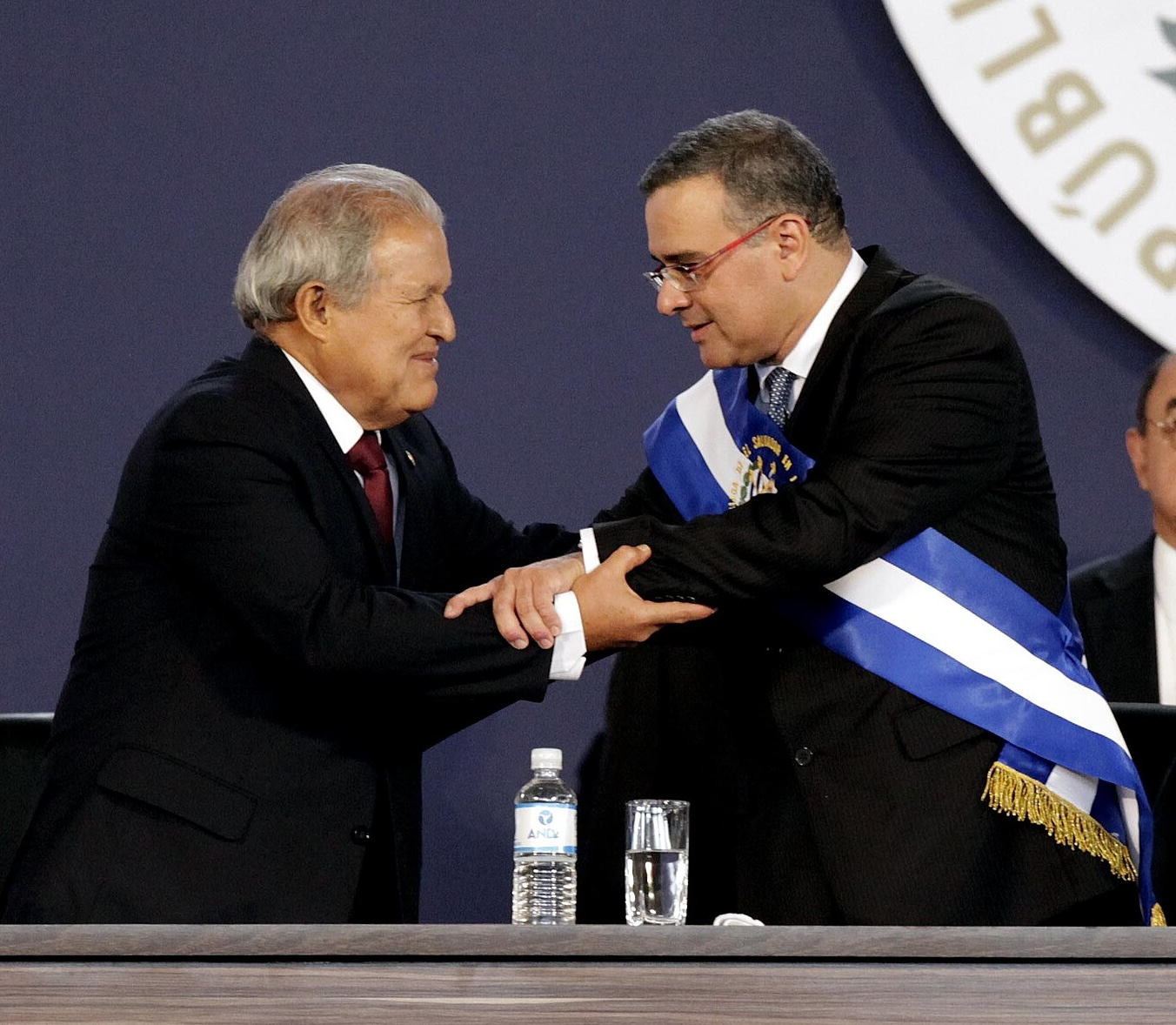
Mauricio Funes (wearing the presidential sash) and Salvador Sánchez Cerén, the two FMLN presidents of El Salvador, 2015

Funes assumed office on 1 June 2009 becoming the FMLN's first president after 15 years of participating in elections. Some of Funes' presidential acts included reestablishing diplomatic relations with Cuba, implementing social reforms and anti-poverty programs, and apologizing for past state atrocities from the civil war and other eras of Salvadoran history. Additionally, the FMLN entered into a coalition government with the National Coalition Party (PCN) and Grand Alliance for National Unity (GANA) in the Legislative Assembly, and in February 2011, the FMLN's Sigfrido Reyes Morales became the president of the Legislative Assembly as a part of the coalition agreement. Funes' coalition with the right-wing GANA and PCN was criticized by more hardline FMLN members. The FMLN–PCN–GANA coalition lost control of the legislature after the 2012 election but negotiated with ARENA to create a grand coalition government, and Reyes retained his position as president of the legislature.

Funes' government implemented a controversial truce with the country's largest street gangs, MS-13 and 18th Street gang, in a bid to lower the country's homicide rate. Mijango and Funes' defense minister, Divisional General David Munguía Payés, were two of the truce's principal negotiators, but Sánchez Cerén denied that the FMLN itself was directly responsible for the truce. The truce was a major campaign topic during the 2014 presidential election. The FMLN nominated Sánchez Cerén and Ortiz as its presidential and vice presidential candidates, respectively. Sánchez Cerén narrowly defeated ARENA's Norman Quijano in the second round with 50.1 percent of the vote. Gutiérrez split from the FMLN in 2013 and attempted to get the splinter New Country Movement (MNP) registered with the TSE in time for the election, but the party failed to accumulate enough signatures to be registered.

Sánchez Cerén was inaugurated on 1 June 2014 becoming the first former guerrilla to serve as President of El Salvador. During his presidency, he attempted to remove restrictions on El Salvador's abortion ban (but this was blocked by right-wing parties), banned metal mining for environmental and public health concerns, and established diplomatic relations with China over Taiwan. The gang truce also collapsed by the time Sánchez Cerén assumed office and homicides spiked during his presidency, peaking at a rate of 104 homicides per 100,000 people in 2015. The FMLN retained control of the Legislative Assembly after the 2015 legislative election; it formed a coalition with GANA and Lorena Peña served as the legislature's president from 2015 to 2016 as a part of the coalition agreement.

In 2017, the FMLN expelled Nayib Bukele, then the mayor of San Salvador, from the party after allegedly throwing an apple at a fellow party member. During the 2018 legislative and municipal elections, Bukele called on his supporters to spoil their vote or not vote instead of voting for the FMLN. The FMLN had its worst electoral showing since 1994 and won only 23 seats. Meanwhile, ARENA gained control of the Legislative Assembly and right-wing parties were able to override Sánchez Cerén's presidential veto. The FMLN's Hugo Martínez finished in third place in the 2019 presidential election behind ARENA's Carlos Calleja and GANA's Bukele, who won the election as a third-party candidate. After Bukele's victory, Roberto Lorenzana, the presidential communications secretary, stated that the FMLN's expulsion of Bukele was a mistake that cost the party votes.

==== Return to opposition (2019–present) ====
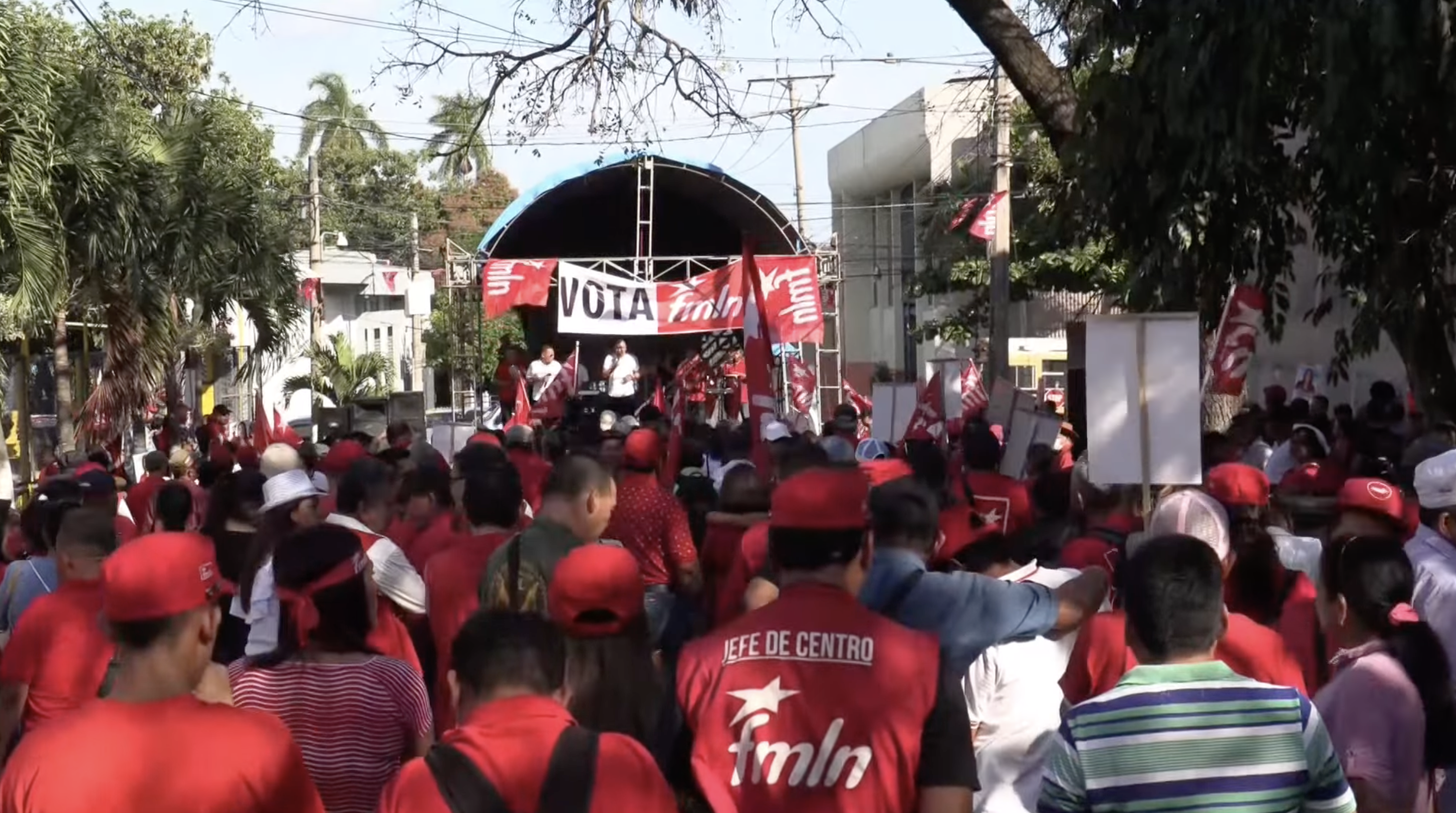
An FMLN campaign rally ahead of the 2024 elections

Bukele's 2019 victory ended the FMLN–ARENA duopoly on controlling the presidency. The FMLN opposed Bukele's government in the Legislative Assembly. In February 2021, FMLN and ARENA legislators briefly considered removing Bukele from office for being "mentally unfit" after he accused the FMLN of staging the deaths of two of its supporters at a rally prior to that month's midterm election. In the election, Bukele's allies won a supermajority in the Legislative Assembly while the FMLN won only 4 seats.

The FMLN remained in the opposition for the duration of the 2021–2024 legislative term. The party opposed various electoral and constitutional reforms ahead of the 2024 elections such as the TSE allowing Bukele to seek immediate re-election, the reduction of seats in the Legislative Assembly from 84 to 60, and the reduction of municipalities from 262 to 44. Ortiz, then the secretary-general of the FMLN, described the reductions as "institutional fraud" by Bukele's government. The FMLN nominated former legislator Manuel Flores for president; he finished in second place with 6.4 percent of the vote behind Bukele. In the legislative election, the FMLN lost all its seats in the Legislative Assembly becoming an extraparliamentary party for the first time since participating in elections in 1994. It furthermore failed to win any municipal races.

On 26 July 2026, the FMLN held its primary election to select candidates for the 2027 presidential, legislative, and municipal elections. The FMLN selected physician Rafael Aguirre and nurse Madaí Santos as its presidential and vice presidential candidates, respectively.

== Ideology ==
=== Civil war-era ideology ===
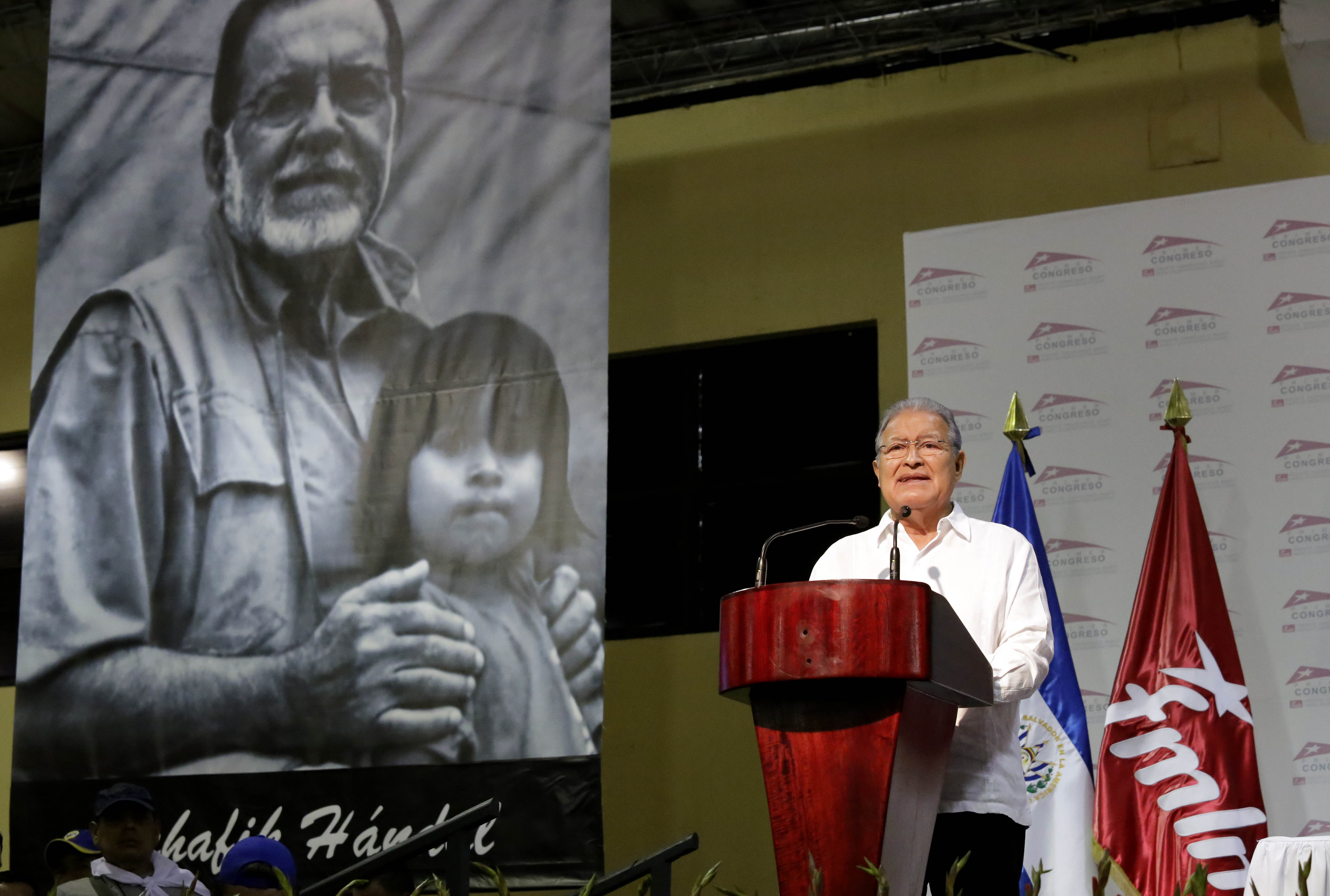
Salvador Sánchez Cerén with a mural of Schafik Hándal in 2015

When the FMLN was established, its members had a wide range of center-left to far-left political positions, but it was largely dominated by its more far-left components. The PCES adhered to Marxism–Leninism, the FPL was Maoist, the ERP followed Marxism–Leninism and Che Guevara's foquismo, the FARN had close relations with social democrats and liberals, and the PRTC was Trotskyist (although it later moderated to Marxism–Leninism after it joined the FMLN). The Havana negotiations and subsequent formations of the DGU and FMLN were done to counteract ideological infighting among the leftist militant organizations and unite themselves under a single vanguard. Under the FMLN, its member militant groups united under the banner of Marxism–Leninism.

The Farabundo Martí National Liberation Front was heavily inspired by Cuban Revolution and was based on Marxism-Leninism as well as liberation theology. The communist foundations of the party were however not aligned with Soviet communism, but with "Western Marxism" that developed from the ideology of Ernest Mandel, Trường Chinh and most importantly Ché Guevara; Marxist-Leninist thought was infused with the concepts of revolutionary nationalism and national liberation, and lack of national autonomy was considered an expression of landowning elite's interests.

Although the FMLN was largely united, some disagreements remained between the various factions. Questions of whether to attain victory through a prolonged war or a rapid insurrection or on how much of the struggle should be based on political or military action continued to divide the FMLN, but many of these disagreements faded following Carpio's suicide in 1983. The vast majority of FMLN components also opposed receiving support from the Soviet Union, viewing it as corrupt and oppressive. Most groups instead opted for support from Cuba and Nicaragua. Only FAL/PCES and some hardline FPL members supported Soviet aid, while the ERP promoted nationalism and was suspicious of Cuban support.

The FMLN's members were largely in agreement on supporting the implementation of a mixed economy rather than a command economy, and most also supported non-alignment. In 1984, the FMLN stated that it was in a "struggle against colonialism, neocolonialism, Zionism, racial discrimination, and apartheid". The FMLN also utilized liberation theology to rally support from the country's Catholic population.

=== Post-civil war ideology ===
Being initially a mix of Marxism-Leninism and liberation theology, the FMLN would moderate in the late 1980s and hold peace talks with the Salvadoran government, demanding power-sharing and transition to democratic rule. The leaders of FMLN and FDR established alliances and agreements with social-democrats figures from Latin America, Canada and Europe, which caused their political mutation as the prospect of a negotiated settlement became more and more possible. After building a potent front of social democratic governments of Europe and Latin America that opposed U.S. policy in Central America, the FMLN gradually abandoned Marxism-Leninism and embraced democratic socialism between 1988 and 1991 while maintaining its close ties to the Catholic Church. Catholic allies of the FMLN would call the moderation of the party "its own aggiornamento, its own Vatican II."

Although the FMLN is traditionally described as left-wing, it is sometimes still described as far-left. During Funes' presidency, the FMLN embraced left-wing populism. El Salvador did not join the Venezuelan-led Bolivarian Alliance for the Peoples of Our America (ALBA) as Funes did not want to follow Chavismo, but some local FMLN chapters created ALBA Petróleo that sold discounted gas from ALBA members.

== Relationship with the Catholic Church ==
Catholic clergy had a prominent role within the FMLN, as apart from being considered "authentic representatives" of Salvadoran people that legitimatized and popularized FMLN in the eyes of Salvadoran peasantry, Catholic priests would also join the party directly and become guerrillas, with at least one priest becoming a commander. Because of this, FMLN was described as "the merging of the popular church and the political opposition". This was augmented with Sandinista National Liberation Front (FSLN) overthrowing the Nicaraguan government in the 1979 Nicaraguan Revolution. In response to the growing radicalization and opposition to Somoza amongst the Church, FSLN incorporated a Catholic message into its program; this was augmented by left-wing Catholic organizations such as the Movimiento Cristiano Revolucionario joining the FSLN, whose members would assume high responsibilities within the Sandinista government. The Sandinistas were a source of inspiration and support for the FMLN.

FMLN was born through liberation theology priests who promoted the "conscientization" of the Salvadoran working class, who argued that their desperation and poverty was not "God's will or the result of their own failures" but rather the consequence of capitalism; the party would even earn the support of Archbishop Óscar Romero, who believed that oppressive conditions made some forms of violence acceptable, stating: "Christians are not afraid of combat; they know how to fight, but they prefer the language of peace. However, when a dictatorship seriously violates human rights and attacks the common good of the nation, when it becomes unbearable and closes all channels of dialogue, when this happens, the Church speaks of the legitimate right of insurrectional violence." The clergy was further radicalized after Romero was murdered by a right-wing death squad, with priests such as Rogelio Poncel fleeing to mountains and joining the Marxist-Leninist ERP guerillas there, which would later become one of the co-founders of the FMLN. Justifying his decision, Poncel wrote: "The Bible confronts the established order. It must be seen from the point of view of the poor, and Christ was poor .... A Christian, a priest, must of necessity be a revolutionary. How can we conform what we preach with a system that oppresses and exploits?" Given the Catholic nature of the movement, most FMLN members and guerilla fighters were Catholics who "understood revolution in the language of religion".

The FMLN has a symbiotic relationship with the Catholic Church marked by mutual support, leading political scientists to compare the party to the similarly pro-Catholic Sandinista National Liberation Front of Nicaragua. FMLN worked closely together with the Revolutionary Democratic Front led by Catholic Democrats who rebelled against the government following the murder of Enrique Álvarez Córdova. The FMLN built an extensive network of ties and connections to Salvadoran Catholic Democrats through churches and other religious organizations, with rural church-run communities known as Christian Base Communities (CEBs) becoming the main source of party's support, shelter and recruitment. Through liberation theology, Salvadoran clergy would radicalize the local peasantry into joining and aiding the FMLN; in 1977, one Jesuit remarked: "Slowly the peasants began to abandon their fatalism, slowly they began to understand that their hunger, their disease, their infant mortality, their unemployment, their unpaid wages, were not the will of God but the result of the greed of a few Salvadorans and of their own passivism."

Liberation theology, which in case of FMLN represents a strand of Catholic socialism, was developed by radicalized priests connecting to the most depressed areas of El Salvador, founding Christian-based communities and worker associations and supporting rural communities through charity work and literacy campaigns. Middle-class youth of Catholic universities became exposed to the misery of the Salvadoran working class, and the teaching of liberation theology provided them with justification of violence and armed struggle in name of improving working and living conditions.

== Party structure ==
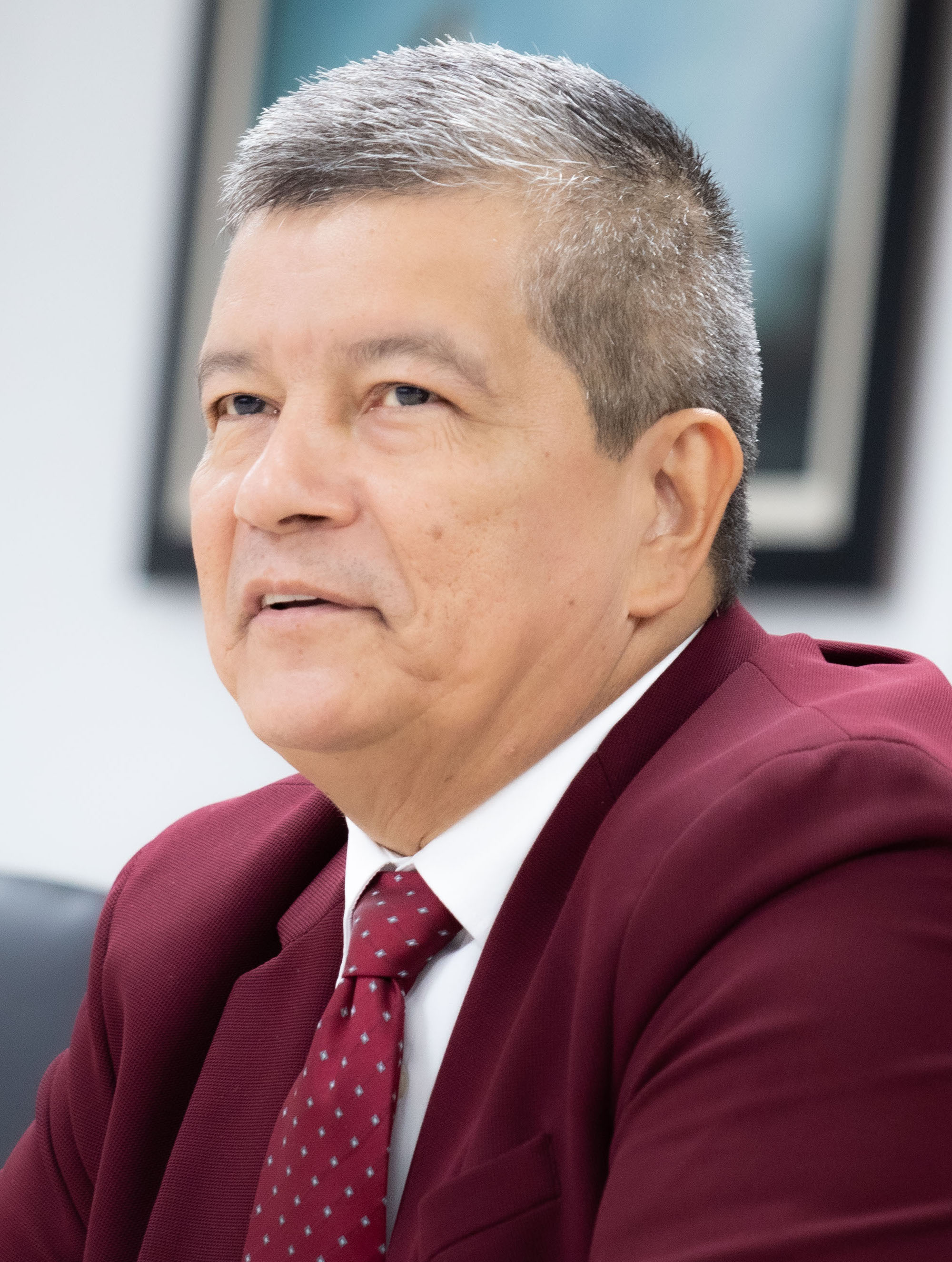
Manuel Flores, the FMLN's 2024 presidential candidate and leader since August 2024

The FMLN's headquarters is located at 27 Poniente Street No. 1316 in Colonia Layco, San Salvador, the country's capital city. Since since 4 August 2024, Flores and Marleni Funes have served as the party's secretary-general and deputy secretary-general, respectively. As of 2024, the FMLN has around 16,000 members. The FMLN Youth is the party's youth wing and "Anthem of the FMLN" ("Himno del FMLN") is the party's anthem.

In PARLACEN, the FMLN is a member of the Parliamentary Group of the Left. The FMLN is also a member of COPPPAL and the São Paulo Forum, two coalitions of left-wing Latin American political parties.

== Electoral history ==
=== Presidential elections ===
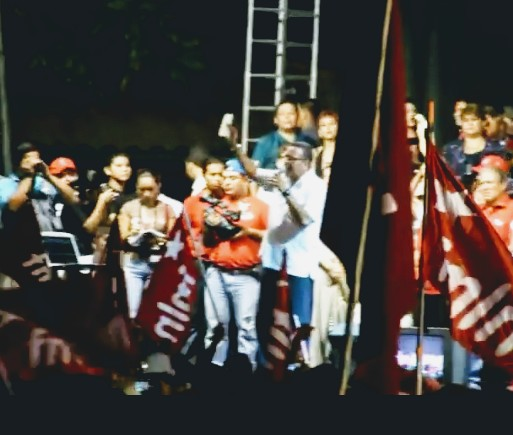
Mauricio Funes at a 2009 campaign rally in San Miguel

Election	Candidate	First round			Second round			Result	Ref.
Election	Candidate	Votes	%	Pos.	Votes	%	Pos.	Result	Ref.
1989	Supported Guillermo Ungo (Note: The FMLN was not a legal political party when it supported Ungo's 1989 presidential campaign.)	35,642	3.80%	▲4th	—			Lost ✗	
1994	Rubén Zamora	331,629	24.99%	▲2nd	378,980	31.65%	▲2nd	Lost ✗	
1999	Facundo Guardado	343,472	29.05%	2nd	—			Lost ✗	
2004	Schafik Hándal	812,519	35.68%	2nd	—			Lost ✗	
2009	Mauricio Funes	1,354,000	51.32%	▲1st	—			Elected ✓	
2014	Salvador Sánchez Cerén	1,315,768	48.92%	1st	1,495,815	50.11%	▲1st	Elected ✓	
2019	Hugo Martínez	389,289	14.41%	▼3rd	—			Lost ✗	
2024	Manuel Flores	204,167	6.40%	▲2nd	—			Lost ✗	
2027	Rafael Aguirre	To be determined			Second round abolished			TBD	

=== Legislative Assembly elections ===
Election	Votes	%	Position	Seats	+/–	Status in legislature	Ref.
1994	287,811	21.39	▲2nd	21 / 84	New	Opposition	
1997	369,709	33.02	2nd	27 / 84	▲6	Opposition	
2000	426,289	35.22	▲1st	31 / 84	▲4	Opposition	
2003	475,043	33.96	1st	31 / 84	0	Opposition	
2006	785,072	39.29	▼2nd	32 / 84	▲1	Opposition	
2009	943,936	42.60	▲1st	35 / 84	▲3	Coalition government	
2012	804,760	36.76	▼2nd	31 / 84	▼4	Coalition government	
2015	847,289	37.23	2nd	31 / 84	0	Coalition government	
2018	521,257	24.54	2nd	23 / 84	▼9	Opposition	
2021	173,330	6.94	▼4th	4 / 84	▼19	Opposition	
2024	195,920	6.28	▲3rd	0 / 60	▼4	Extraparliamentary	
2027	To be determined						

=== Municipal elections ===
Election	Votes	%	Position	Municipalities	+/–	Ref.
1994			▲3rd	15 / 262	New	
1997	365,176	32.63	▲2nd	49 / 262	▲34	
2000	412,087	33.83	2nd	80 / 262	▲44	
2003	471,042	33.41	2nd	74 / 262	▼6	
2006	781,234	39.04	2nd	54 / 262	▼20	
2009	886,161	39.89	2nd	93 / 262	▲39	
2012	807,644	34.94	2nd	94 / 262	▲1	
2015	892,882	37.73	2nd	85 / 262	▼9	
2018	672,183	29.18	2nd	64 / 262	▼21	
2021	287,321	10.86	▼4th	30 / 262	▼34	
2024	125,733	7.78	▼7th	0 / 44	▼30	
2027	To be determined					

=== PARLACEN elections ===
Election	Votes	%	Position	Seats	+/–	Ref.
1994	287,811	21.39	▲2nd	4 / 20	New	
2000	426,289	35.22	2nd	7 / 20	▲3	
2006	785,072	39.29	▲1st	8 / 20	▲1	
2009	943,936	42.53	1st	9 / 20	▲1	
2015	854,621	39.82	▼2nd	8 / 20	▼1	
2021	181,475	7.30	▼3rd	1 / 20	▼7	
2024	122,926	8.26	3rd	2 / 20	▲2	

== See also ==
- List of political parties in El Salvador
- Politics of El Salvador
- Similar Central American political parties
  - Guatemalan National Revolutionary Unity (URNG)
  - Sandinista National Liberation Front (FSLN)
- Women in the FMLN
