= Popular Action (El Salvador) =

Popular Action (Spanish: Acción Popular) is a political party in El Salvador. It first contested national elections in 2003, when it received 1.1% of the vote, but failed to win a seat.
