= 2004 Salvadoran presidential election =

2004 elections in El Salvador

- 21 March 2004
- Registered: 3,442,330
- Turnout: 67.34% (▲28.77pp)
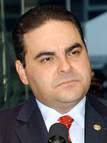

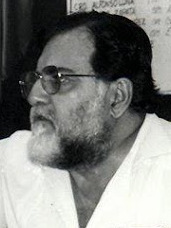
Nominee	Antonio Saca	Schafik Hándal
Party	ARENA	FMLN
Running mate	Ana Vilma de Escobar	Guillermo Francisco Mata Bennett
Popular vote	1,314,436	812,519
Percentage	57.71%	35.68%
- Results by department
President before election
Francisco Flores Pérez
ARENA
Elected President
Antonio Saca
ARENA

Presidential elections were held in El Salvador on 21 March 2004. Antonio Saca of the Nationalist Republican Alliance (ARENA) party won the election with 57% of the vote, avoiding the need for a run-off on 2 May.

== Candidates ==
There were two front-running candidates:

- Antonio Saca of the ruling Nationalist Republican Alliance (ARENA). In his campaign, Saca embraced the free-market and pro-US policies followed by his predecessor and fellow arenista, Francisco Flores. He was also the clear favorite of the Bush administration.
- Schafik Handal of the opposition Farabundo Martí National Liberation Front (FMLN). Handal sought to capitalize on discontent over slow economic growth, increasing crime, and income disparities between the poor and the tiny elite. He pledged to raise the tax burden on the rich and to re-establish diplomatic relations with Cuba.

There were also two additional candidates. However, pre-vote opinion polls consistently placed both of them far behind the two leaders:

- Héctor Silva Argüello, the Christian Democratic Party–United Democratic Centre alliance candidate.
- José Rafael Machuca Zelaya, representing the Party of National Conciliation (PCN).

The election was monitored by 270 international observers and El Salvador's own Tribunal Supremo Electoral, an institution created in 1992 to reform and validate the country's electoral system. Some 17,000 police were on security duty during the election.

== Foreign interference ==
The U.S. government under George W. Bush interfered in the elections by threatening a deterioration of the bilateral relations in case of a victory by FMLN's candidate Schafik Handal. Bush's Assistant Secretary of State for Western Hemisphere Affairs, Otto Reich, stated that the U.S. government was "concerned about the impact that an FMLN victory could have on the commercial, economic, and migration-related relations of the U.S. with El Salvador."

== Results ==
The voter turnout of 67% was the highest in Salvadoran history. The Tribunal Supremo Electoral confirmed Saca as the winner on Monday 22 March. Handal recognized Saca's victory, but chose not to congratulate him. Saca announced his intention to seek reconciliation with the opposition FMLN, in an effort to heal old divisions from the country's violent past. Saca selected Ana Vilma de Escobar to be his vice-president. She was previously the director of the Salvadoran Social Security Institute (ISSS). The new government took office on 1 June 2004.

Candidate	Running mate	Party	Votes	%
Antonio Saca	Ana Vilma de Escobar	Nationalist Republican Alliance	1,314,436	57.71
Schafik Hándal	Guillermo Francisco Mata Bennett	Farabundo Martí National Liberation Front	812,519	35.68
Héctor Silva Argüello	Ana Cristina Sol	PDC–CDU	88,737	3.90
José Rafael Machuca Zelaya	Genaro Isaac Ramírez Barrera	National Conciliation Party	61,781	2.71
Total			2,277,473	100.00
Valid votes			2,277,473	98.25
Invalid/blank votes			40,508	1.75
Total votes			2,317,981	100.00
Registered voters/turnout			3,442,330	67.34
Source: TSE
