= Ciro Cruz Zepeda =

Salvadoran politician (1945–2022)

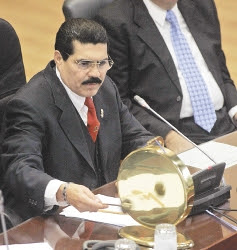
- Cruz Zepeda in 2006

President of the Legislative Assembly of El Salvador
- In office 1 May 2009 – 1 February 2011
- Preceded by: Rubén Orellana
- Succeeded by: Sigfrido Reyes Morales
- In office 1 May 2002 – 1 May 2006
- Preceded by: Walter Araujo
- Succeeded by: Rubén Orellana
- In office 1 May 2000 – 1 May 2001
- Preceded by: Juan Duch Martínez
- Succeeded by: Walter Araujo

Deputy of the Legislative Assembly of El Salvador from San Salvador
- In office 1 May 1985 – 1 May 2012

Personal details
- Born: Ciro Cruz Zepeda Peña; 3 May 1945 Jutiapa, El Salvador
- Died: 12 December 2022 (aged 77) Jutiapa, El Salvador
- Party: National Coalition Party
- Occupation: Politician

Ciro Cruz Zepeda Peña (3 May 1945 – 12 December 2022) was a Salvadoran politician who served as the leader of the National Coalition Party (PCN). From October 1985 until March 1989, he presided over the country's Court of Accounts. He was a deputy for San Salvador in the Legislative Assembly of El Salvador between 1985 and 2012, serving as Vice President of the Legislative Assembly from 1991 to 1994, before serving as the President of the Legislative Assembly on three occasions from 2000 to 2001, 2002 to 2006, and 2009 to 2011. For several periods, from 1994 to 2001, he also served as a deputy of the Central American Parliament (Parlacen).

Cruz Zepeda was born in Jutiapa on 3 May 1945. He died in Jutiapa on 12 December 2022, at the age of 77. The same day, his remains would be placed at the La Auxiliadora funeral home, and became available for viewing, before he was eventually buried at Capillas Memoriales de San Salvador.

== Political positions ==
- President of the Honourable Managerial Board of the Legislative Assembly of the Republic of The Saviour - Period: May 2009 - April 2012
- President of the Parliament Centroamericano (PARLACEN) - Period: October 2007 - October 2008
- Proprietary deputy of the Parliament Centroamericano (PARLACEN) - Period: October 2006 - October 2011
- President of the Honourable Managerial Board of the Legislative Assembly of the Republic of The Saviour - Period: May 2003 - April 2006
- Proprietary deputy of the Parliament Centroamericano (PARLACEN) - Period: October 2001 - October 2006
- President of the Honourable Managerial Board of the Legislative Assembly of the Republic of The Saviour - Period: May 2002 - April 2003
- First Vice-president of the Honourable Managerial Board of the Legislative Assembly of the Republic of The Saviour - Period: May 2001 - April 2002
- President of the Honourable Managerial Board of the Legislative Assembly of the Republic of The Saviour - Period: May 2000 - April 2001
- Proprietary deputy of the Legislative Assembly of the Republic of The Saviour - Period: May 2000 - April 2003
- Proprietary deputy, by the Circunscripción National, in front of the Legislative Assembly of the Republic of The Saviour - Period: May 1997 - April 2000
- Proprietary deputy of the Parliament Centroamericano (PARLACEN) - Period: October 1995 - October 2001
- Secretary of Managerial Board of the PARLACEN, by the Republic of The Saviour - Period: October 1995 - October 1997
- Proprietary deputy of the Parliament Centroamericano (PARLACEN) - Period: October 1991 - October 1996
- Secretary of Managerial Board of the PARLACEN, by the Republic of The Saviour - Period: October 1994 - October 1995
- Vice-president of the Honourable Managerial Board of the Legislative Assembly of the Republic of The Saviour - Period: May 1991 - April 1994
- President of the Court of Accounts of the Republic of The Saviour, charge to the cual elected and reelected by the Legislative Assembly for two consecutive periods - Period: October 1985 - March 1989
