= Nayib Bukele =

President of El Salvador since 2019

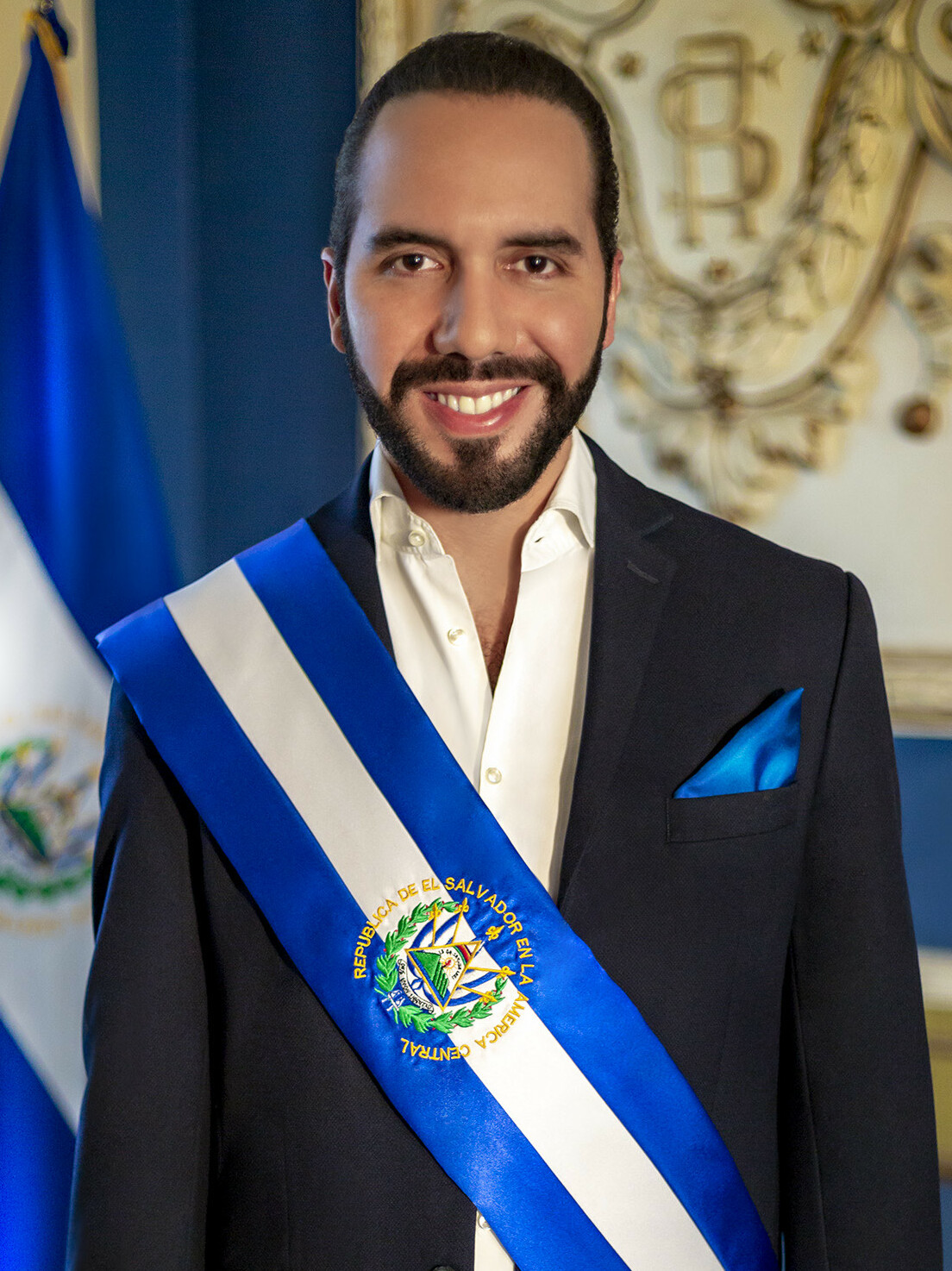
- Official portrait, 2019

43rd President of El Salvador
- Incumbent
- Assumed office 1 June 2019 (Note: Claudia Rodríguez de Guevara served as acting president while Bukele's presidential powers and duties were suspended from 30 November 2023 to 1 June 2024 during Bukele's re-election campaign and subsequent presidential transition period.)
- Vice President: Félix Ulloa
- Preceded by: Salvador Sánchez Cerén

125th Mayor of San Salvador
- In office 1 May 2015 – 1 May 2018
- Preceded by: Norman Quijano
- Succeeded by: Ernesto Muyshondt

Mayor of Nuevo Cuscatlán
- In office 1 May 2012 – 1 May 2015
- Preceded by: Álvaro Rodríguez
- Succeeded by: Michelle Sol

Personal details
- Born: Nayib Armando Bukele Ortez; 24 July 1981 (age 45) San Salvador, El Salvador
- Party: Nuevas Ideas (since 2017)
- Other political affiliations: GANA (2018–2023); Democratic Change (2018); Independent (2017); FMLN (2012–2017)
- Spouse: Gabriela Rodríguez (m. 2014)
- Children: 2
- Parent: Armando Bukele Kattán (father)
- Education: Central American University (no degree)
- Occupation: Politician; businessman
- Cabinet: Cabinet of Nayib Bukele

Nayib Armando Bukele Ortez (Note: Latin American Spanish pronunciation: [naˈʝiβ aɾˈmando βuˈkele oɾˈtes].) (born 24 July 1981) is a Salvadoran politician who has served as the 43rd president of El Salvador since 2019.

In 1999, Bukele established an advertising company and worked at another owned by his father, Armando Bukele Kattán. Both companies advertised election campaigns for the Farabundo Martí National Liberation Front (FMLN) political party. Bukele entered politics in 2011. In 2012, he joined the FMLN and was elected mayor of Nuevo Cuscatlán. Bukele served until his 2015 election as Mayor of San Salvador, where he served until 2018. In 2017, Bukele was ousted from the FMLN. He founded the Nuevas Ideas political party shortly afterward and pursued a presidential campaign in 2019. After the Supreme Electoral Court (TSE) refused to register his party, Bukele ran for president with the Grand Alliance for National Unity (GANA) and won with 53 percent of the vote.

In July 2019, Bukele implemented the Territorial Control Plan to reduce El Salvador's 2019 homicide rate of 38 per 100,000 people. Homicides fell by 50 percent during Bukele's first year in office. After 87 people were killed by gangs over one weekend in March 2022, Bukele initiated a nationwide crackdown on gangs, resulting in the arrests of over 85,000 people with alleged gang affiliations by December 2024. El Salvador's homicide rate decreased to 1.3 homicides per 100,000 in 2025, the lowest on record in El Salvador and the lowest in the Americas, although El Salvador uses a narrower definition of homicide than some countries. Bukele passed a law in 2021 that made bitcoin legal tender in El Salvador and promoted plans to build Bitcoin City. In June 2023, the Legislative Assembly approved Bukele's proposals to reduce the number of municipalities from 262 to 44 and the number of seats in the legislature from 84 to 60. He ran for re-election in the 2024 presidential election and won with 85 percent of the vote after the Supreme Court of Justice reinterpreted the constitution's ban on consecutive re-election.

Bukele is highly popular in El Salvador and throughout Latin America. He holds an average approval rating of 88.6% during his entire presidency with approval ratings never having fallen below 80%. El Salvador has experienced democratic backsliding under Bukele's leadership, falling 61 places in the World Press Freedom Index between 2019 and 2025 and 24 places in the Economist Intelligence Unit's Democracy Index, which now classifies El Salvador as a hybrid regime. In February 2020, Bukele ordered 40 soldiers into the Legislative Assembly building to intimidate lawmakers into approving a US$109 million loan for the Territorial Control Plan, an event that triggered a political crisis and was described by the opposition as a self-coup. After Nuevas Ideas won a supermajority in the 2021 legislative election, Bukele's allies in the legislature voted to replace the attorney general and all five justices of the Supreme Court of Justice's Constitutional Chamber. Bukele has criticized journalists and news outlets, and has furthered press censorship. Following a controversial constitutional amendment on 31 July 2025, the Legislative Assembly enabled indefinite reelection, extended presidential terms from five to six years, and eliminated the two-round system.

== Early life ==
Nayib Armando Bukele Ortez was born on 24 July 1981 in San Salvador, El Salvador. His father was Armando Bukele Kattán, a businessman and industrial chemist, and his mother is Olga Marina Ortez. Bukele's father died in 2015. Bukele was the couple's first child. He has three younger brothers, Karim, Yusef, and Ibrajim, and has four paternal half-sisters and two paternal half-brothers. Bukele's father converted from Christianity to Islam in the 1980s, became an imam, and founded four mosques in El Salvador. Bukele's mother is Catholic. Bukele's paternal grandparents were Palestinian Christians who emigrated to El Salvador from Jerusalem and Bethlehem in 1921. His maternal grandfather was Greek Orthodox, and his maternal grandmother was Catholic.

Bukele completed his secondary education at the Escuela Panamericana in 1999 at age 18. Bukele enrolled at Central American University in San Salvador to study legal sciences, aspiring to become a lawyer, but dropped out to work for the Nölck advertising agency, one of his father's businesses. Nölck campaigned for the Farabundo Martí National Liberation Front (FMLN), a left-wing Salvadoran political party.

In 1999, Bukele founded the marketing company Obermet, also known as 4am Saatchi & Saatchi El Salvador, and was its president from 1999 to 2006 and from 2010 to 2012. The company ran political advertising for the FMLN presidential campaigns of Schafik Hándal in 2004 and Mauricio Funes in 2009. Bukele was president of Yamaha Motors El Salvador, a company that sells and distributes Yamaha products in El Salvador, from 2009 to 2012. During Bukele's business career, he called himself a "businessman with a great future" ("empresario con gran futuro").

== Early political career ==
=== Mayor of Nuevo Cuscatlán ===
In 2011, Bukele announced that he would enter politics as a member of the FMLN to break out of "his comfort zone" ("su zona de confort") as a businessman. Officially joining the party in 2012, he campaigned for the mayoralty of Nuevo Cuscatlán, a municipality in the department of La Libertad, part of the San Salvador metropolitan area. Bukele's campaign was supported by the Democratic Change party. He was elected mayor of Nuevo Cuscatlán in March 2012 with 51.67 percent of the vote, defeating primary challenger Tomás Rodríguez of the Nationalist Republican Alliance (ARENA). Bukele took office on 1 May 2012 as the country's youngest mayor.

Bukele created a scholarship program for youths in the municipality, donating his $2,000 salary to fund the program. In August 2014, Bukele launched Sphere PM, a project that launched a high-altitude balloon to an altitude of 100,000 feet (30,000 m) and took pictures of El Salvador. He stated that Sphere PM's goal was to promote education in science and technology to dissuade the municipality's youth from crime. Bukele spoke at the United Nations headquarters about projects he had undertaken as mayor of Nuevo Cuscatlán as part of the November 2014 World Cities Day. In January 2015, he inaugurated a $1.7 million boulevard connecting Nuevo Cuscatlán with Huizúcar and Antiguo Cuscatlán. Bukele did much of his mayoral work with funding from ALBA Petróleos, owned by the Venezuelan oil company PDVSA.

=== Mayor of San Salvador ===
In August 2014, Bukele announced that he would seek election as mayor of San Salvador in the 2015 elections. His candidacy was confirmed by FMLN secretary-general Medardo González on 19 August 2014. Bukele delegated administration of Nuevo Cuscatlán to council member Michelle Sol in February 2015 to focus on his campaign. During his campaign, which was supported by the Salvadoran Progressive Party, FMLN party leadership called Bukele the party's "crown jewel" ("joya de la corona"). Bukele's campaign used catchphrases such as "we have to change history" ("tenemos que cambiar la historia") and "together we will go forward" ("juntos saldremos adelante") to rally support from young voters.

His primary opponent was Edwin Zamora, a businessman and Legislative Assembly deputy from ARENA. Bukele led Zamora in opinion polls before the election. He defeated Zamora with 50.38 percent of the vote on 1 March 2015, and took office on 1 May. Bukele appointed a cousin, Hassan, and his half-brother Yamil to administrative positions on the San Salvador municipal council. The appointments were criticized by ARENA and FMLN politicians.

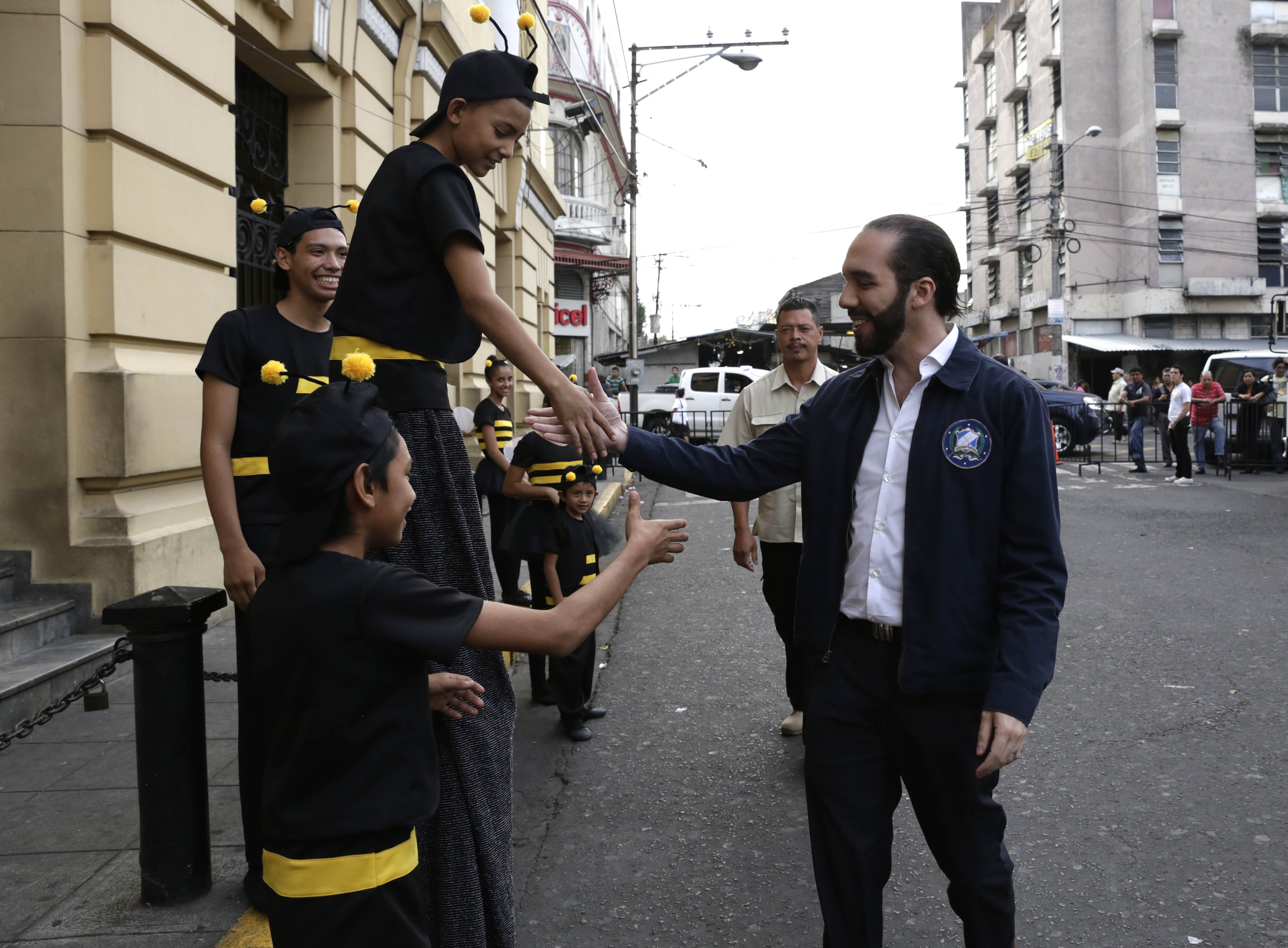
Bukele at the opening of the La Colmenita children's theater, January 2016

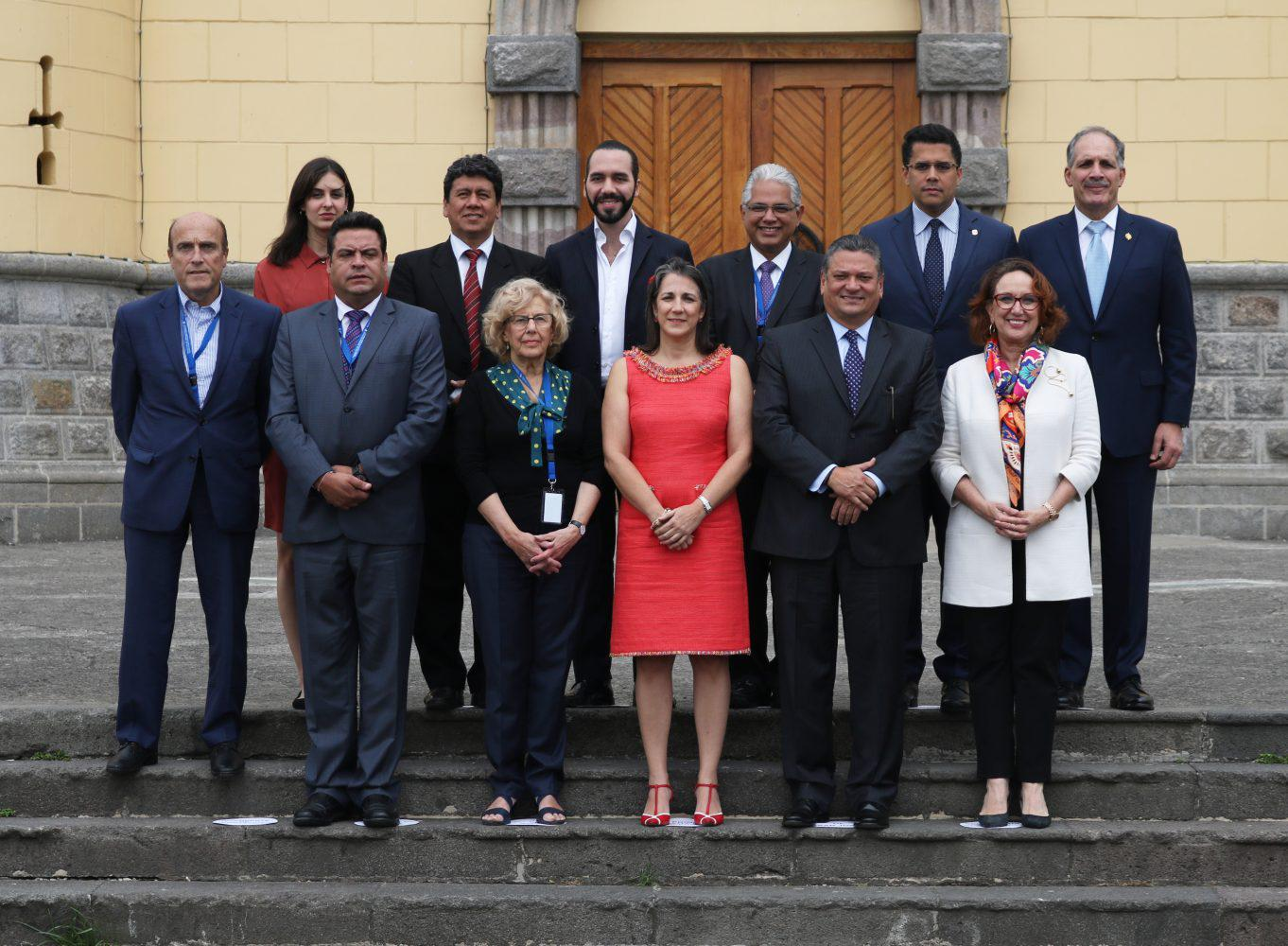
At the 18th summit of the Union of Ibero-American Capital Cities, April 2018

As mayor, Bukele began a "reordering" ("reordenamiento") to revitalize the city's historic downtown area and combat crime. On the day Bukele took office, he reverted the names of two streets in San Salvador (Calle Mayor Roberto D'Aubuisson and Boulevard Coronel José Arturo Castellanos) to Calle San Antonio Abad and Boulevard Venezuela, respectively. Both names had been changed by Bukele's predecessor, Norman Quijano. Zamora, who had become a member of San Salvador's municipal council, stated that the names were reverted due to flaws in the initial renaming process. He added that another street would be named in honor of Castellanos, who provided fake Salvadoran passports to 40,000 Central European Jews to help them escape the Holocaust. Bukele renamed 89 Avenida Norte in honor of Castellanos in June 2016.

In December 2016, Bukele inaugurated the Cuscatlán Market to encourage street vendors to relocate their businesses. Many vendors refused to move, despite the market. Political opponents and investigative journalists accused him of negotiating with gangs to organize its construction, since it was located in gang-controlled territory. In January 2016, Bukele began a "San Salvador 100% Illuminated" campaign to "have a light on every corner of San Salvador" to combat crime in the city. The campaign was completed by May 2016. He also installed video-surveillance cameras in parts of San Salvador that were severely affected by crime. Bukele inaugurated the renovated downtown Gerardo Barrios Plaza in October 2017, and the new downtown Lineal Plaza in April 2018.

Bukele created a scholarship program, known as the Dalton Project and funded by his salary, for youth in San Salvador to prevent them from joining gangs. Bukele also created the My New School project to modernize San Salvador's primary schools. In May 2015, he signed an agreement with Panama City mayor José Blandón to establish a sister city relationship between San Salvador and Panama City. In November 2015, Bukele signed an agreement with the Spanish National League of Professional Football to promote sports for San Salvador's youth.

In September 2016, Bukele visited Washington, D.C., and met with Mayor Muriel Bowser to discuss the implementation of urban-development projects. Bukele received the keys to the city of Gaithersburg, Maryland, and 11 September was designated the "Day of Mayor Nayib Bukele" ("Día del alcalde Nayib Bukele"). He visited Taipei in February 2017 and met with Taiwanese president Tsai Ing-wen to enhance the sister-city relationship between San Salvador and Taipei. In February 2018, Bukele attended the 32nd International Mayors Conference in Jerusalem and prayed at the Western Wall.

=== Troll Center case ===
In January 2016, the El Diario de Hoy and La Prensa Gráfica newspapers reported that the Búnker digital-programming company had created mirror sites of the newspapers in June 2015 and posted false information in an attempt to damage their reputations; the newspapers described the incident as a cyberattack. In a subsequent investigation by the office of the attorney general (FGR), Bukele allegedly instructed a Twitter user to create the mirror sites. Bukele denied involvement in the creation of the mirror sites. The incident became known as the "Troll Center" case. Five people were charged in relation to the case, but the charges were dropped in December 2017.

On 4 July 2017, Bukele sued La Prensa Gráfica for $6 million, alleging that the newspaper had defamed and slandered him in its reporting of the cyberattacks by "falsely" ("falsamente") connecting him to the Troll Center case and "damag[ing] [Bukele's] image" ("dañó la imagen del señor alcalde"). Later that month, a court dismissed Bukele's lawsuit and three other courts rejected his appeals. In December 2018, the FGR stated that it had reviewed information supposedly linking Bukele's cell phone to the cyberattacks.

=== Expulsion from the FMLN ===
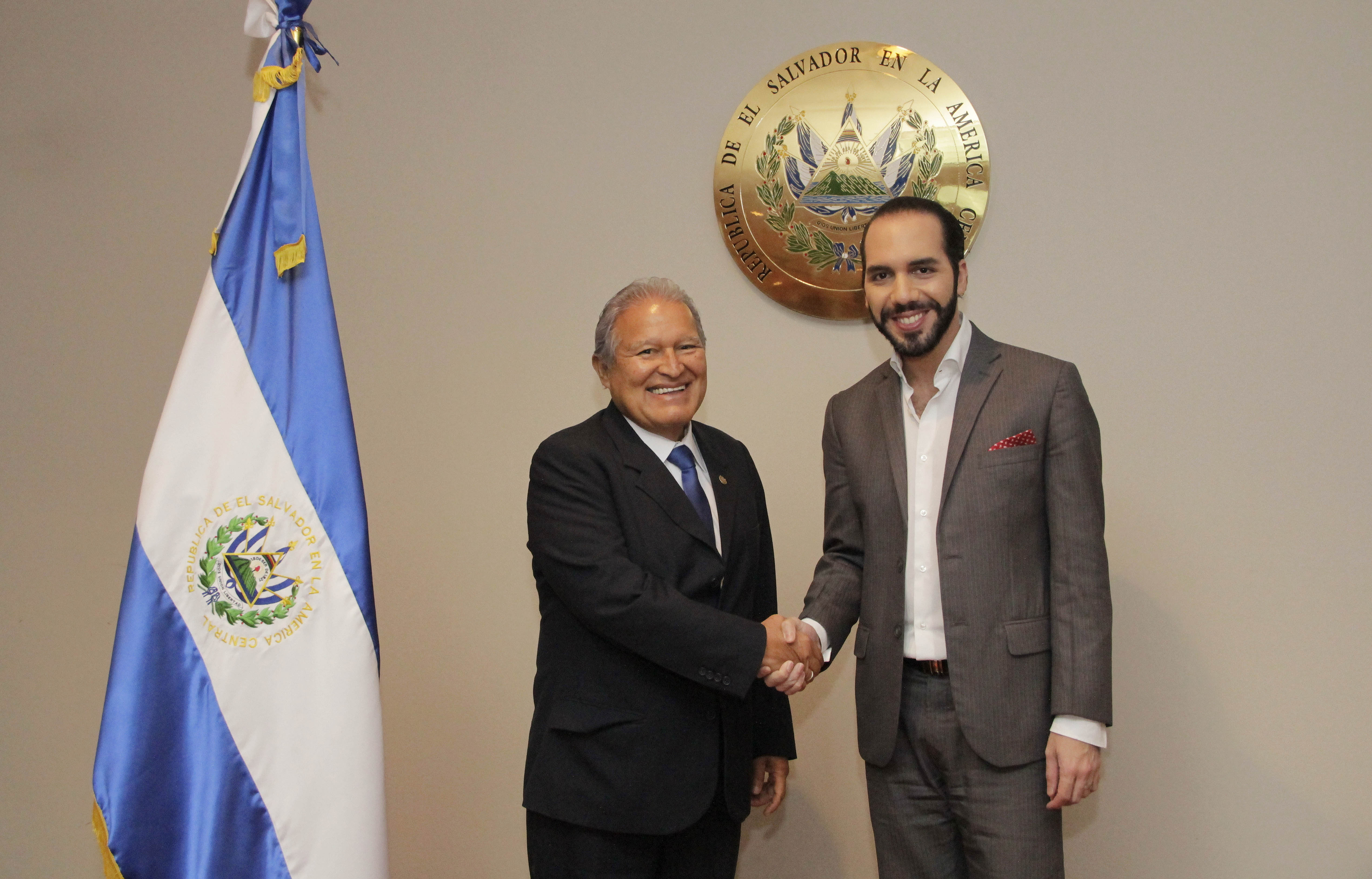
Then-mayor Bukele with President Salvador Sánchez Cerén of the FMLN, May 2015

Bukele's relationship with the FMLN began to deteriorate after he became mayor of San Salvador. He clashed with other party members on Twitter, and frequently resisted FMLN party leadership. Bukele became a strong critic of Salvador Sánchez Cerén, the FMLN president of El Salvador who was elected in 2014. He threatened to leave the party in 2015 if the FMLN-led government reappointed Luis Martínez as the country's attorney general, describing Martínez as "a gangster, very corrupt, [and] the worst of the worst". The FMLN relented and replaced Martínez, and Bukele later admitted that his threat to leave the party "was a bluff".

In September 2017, San Salvador FMLN member Xóchitl Marchelli alleged that Bukele had thrown an apple at her, calling her a "damn traitor" ("maldita traidora") and a "witch" ("bruja"). Bukele did not attend an FMLN ethics tribunal on 7 October 2017, saying that the tribunal was biased in favor of Marchelli. On 10 October 2017, he was expelled from the party after the tribunal determined that he had engaged in "defamatory acts" ("actos difamatorios") against the party, showed "disrespect" ("irrespeto") for women's rights and the party's statutes, and made "disqualifying comments" ("comentarios descalificadores") to party members.

Marchelli sued Bukele through the Specialized Investigative Court, but sent a letter to the court in October 2018 saying that she would no longer pursue the matter for health reasons. Despite Marchelli's withdrawal, the FGR proceeded with the case. On 29 March 2019, the Specialized Sentencing Court acquitted Bukele.

In the 2018 legislative and municipal elections, where Bukele was favored to win re-election before his expulsion, the FMLN had its worst performance since 1994, the party's first election. It lost six seats in the Legislative Assembly, and 16 municipalities. During the election, Bukele called on his supporters nationwide to spoil their vote or stay home on election day rather than support the FMLN. In February 2019, FMLN presidential communications secretary Roberto Lorenzana stated that Bukele's expulsion was a mistake that cost the party votes. In 2025, Bukele remarked that he was "mistaken" ("equivocado") for having previously voted for the FMLN.

=== 2019 presidential election ===
Bukele's popularity as mayor of San Salvador led some journalists to believe that he would run for president in 2019, but he denied that he would. He eventually expressed interest in running for president with the FMLN, but the party did not consider him as its vice-presidential nominee. He wrote on social media that the FMLN had purged him, and portrayed himself as an independent politician who rejected the country's political system.

On 15 October 2017, Bukele announced his intention to run for president in 2019 and form a new political party. He announced the establishment of the Nuevas Ideas party on 25 October 2017 on social media, saying that Nuevas Ideas would seek to remove ARENA and the FMLN from power. During his presidential campaign, Bukele and a network of YouTubers, bloggers, and internet trolls attempted to discredit ARENA and the FMLN. Bukele tried to associate the two parties with the governments of previous presidents that were marred by corruption, using slogans such as "There's enough money when nobody steals" and "Return what was stolen". His campaign promises included the creation of an international commission to combat corruption, the development of a trans-national railroad and a new airport, job opportunities for Salvadorans, and reduced crime.

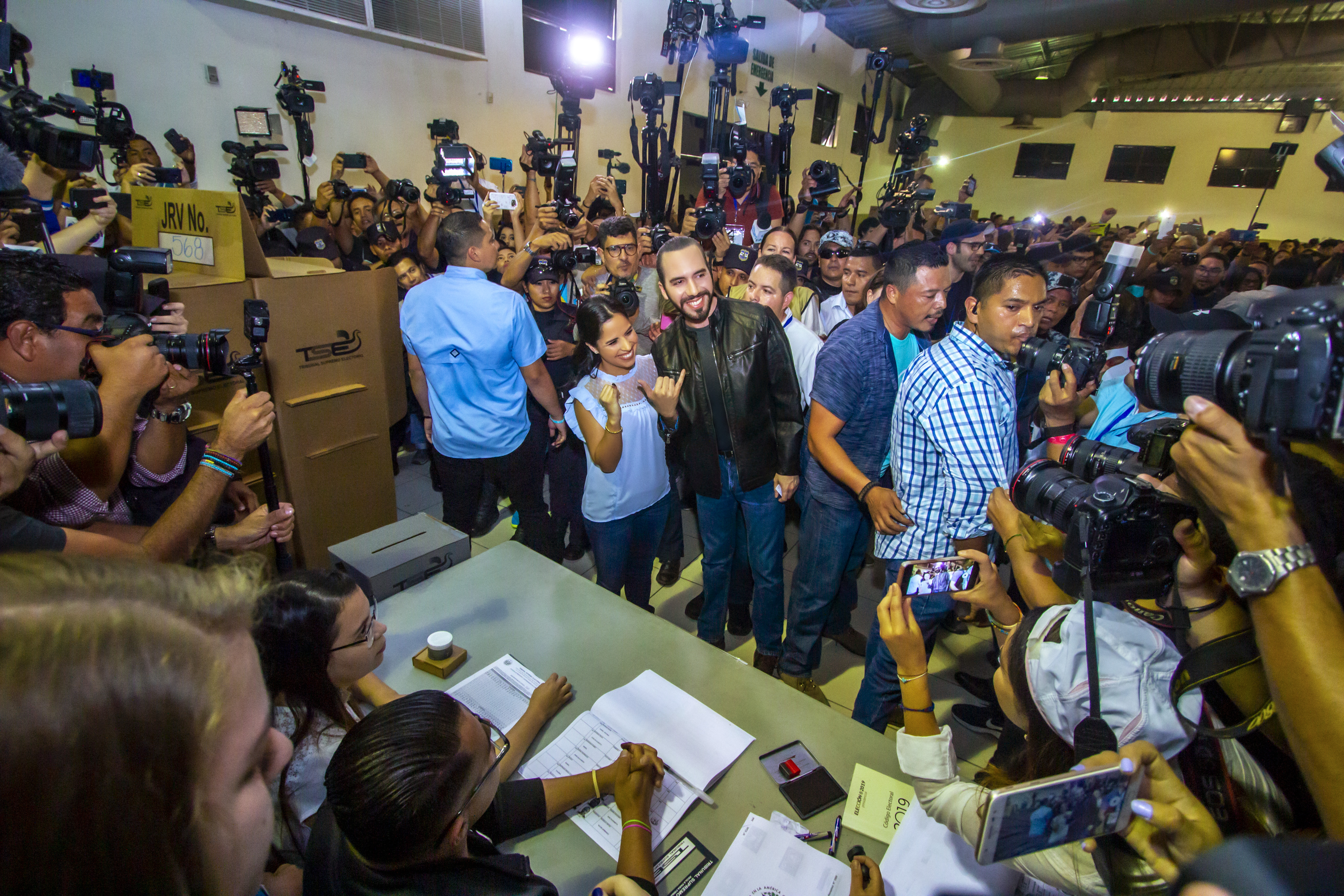
Bukele on election day, February 2019

For Bukele to run for president with Nuevas Ideas, he was required to register the party with the Supreme Electoral Court (TSE). Although Nuevas Ideas had enough signatures to register, Bukele believed that the TSE would not register the party before the 29 July 2018 presidential nomination deadline.

Bukele registered as a member of Democratic Change and sought the party's presidential nomination before the deadline, but the TSE canceled the party's registration four days before the deadline because Democratic Change failed to receive over 50,000 votes during the 2015 legislative elections. On 29 July 2018, Bukele registered with the right-wing Grand Alliance for National Unity (GANA) and received the party's presidential nomination. He selected Félix Ulloa, a lawyer, as his vice-presidential candidate.

Bukele used social media such as Facebook, Instagram, and Twitter extensively throughout his campaign to communicate with his supporters. He did not attend either of the two presidential debates, in December 2018 and January 2019, despite saying that he would attend, claiming that the debate rules were not explained to him. Bukele was the election's front-runner, leading virtually every poll by a substantial margin. His three opponents were ARENA's (Note: Carlos Calleja was supported by a coalition of the Nationalist Republican Alliance (ARENA), the National Coalition Party (PCN), the Christian Democratic Party (PDC), and Salvadoran Democracy that was known as the Alliance for a New Country.) Carlos Calleja, a businessman who owned the Super Selectos supermarket chain; the FMLN's former minister of foreign affairs Hugo Martínez, and Vamos' Josué Alvarado, a businessman. On election day, 3 February 2019, Bukele defeated Calleja, Martínez, and Alvarado with 53.1 percent of the vote. He was the first presidential candidate to be elected since José Napoleón Duarte (1984–1989) who was not a member of ARENA or the FMLN.

== Presidency ==
=== Inaugurations ===
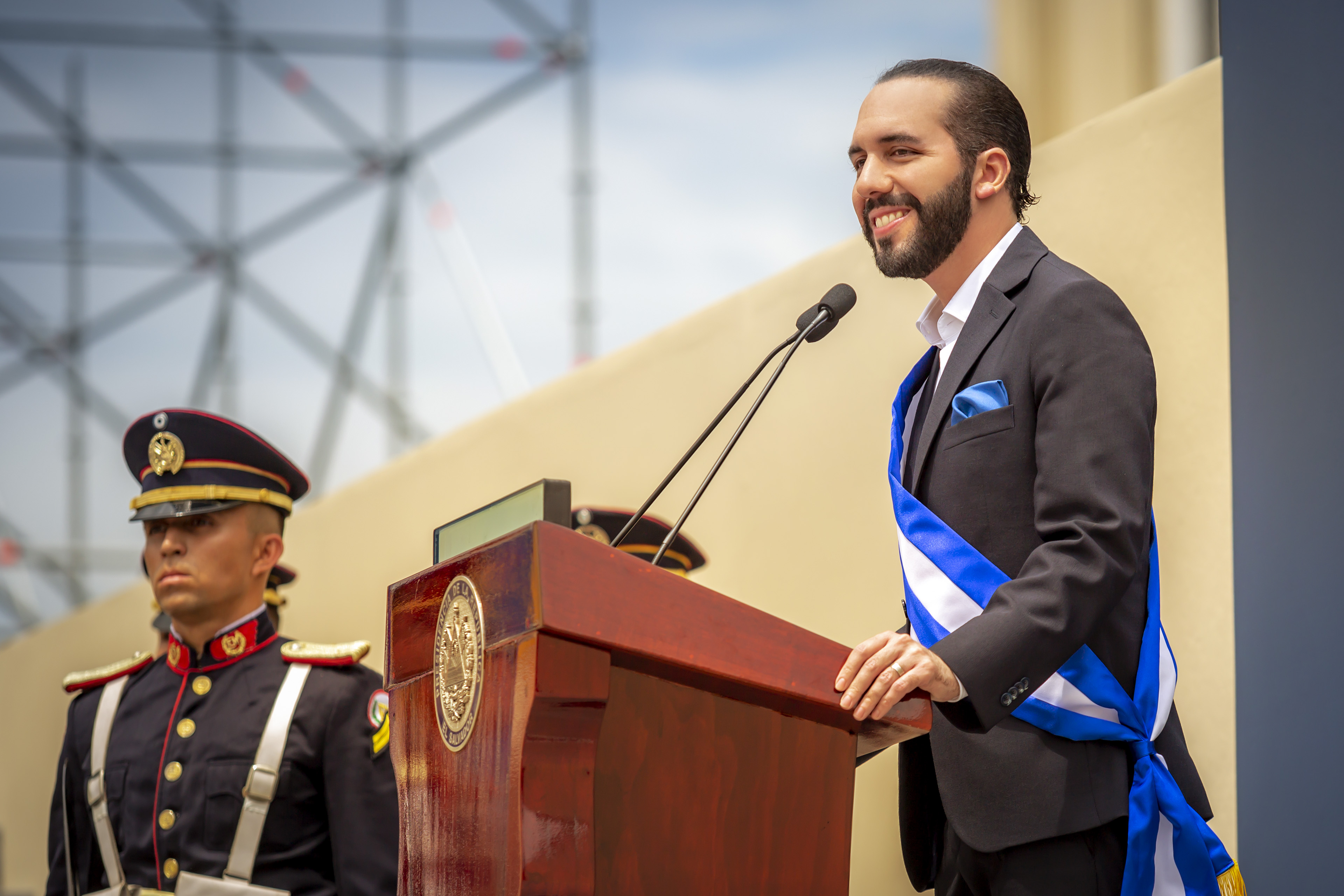
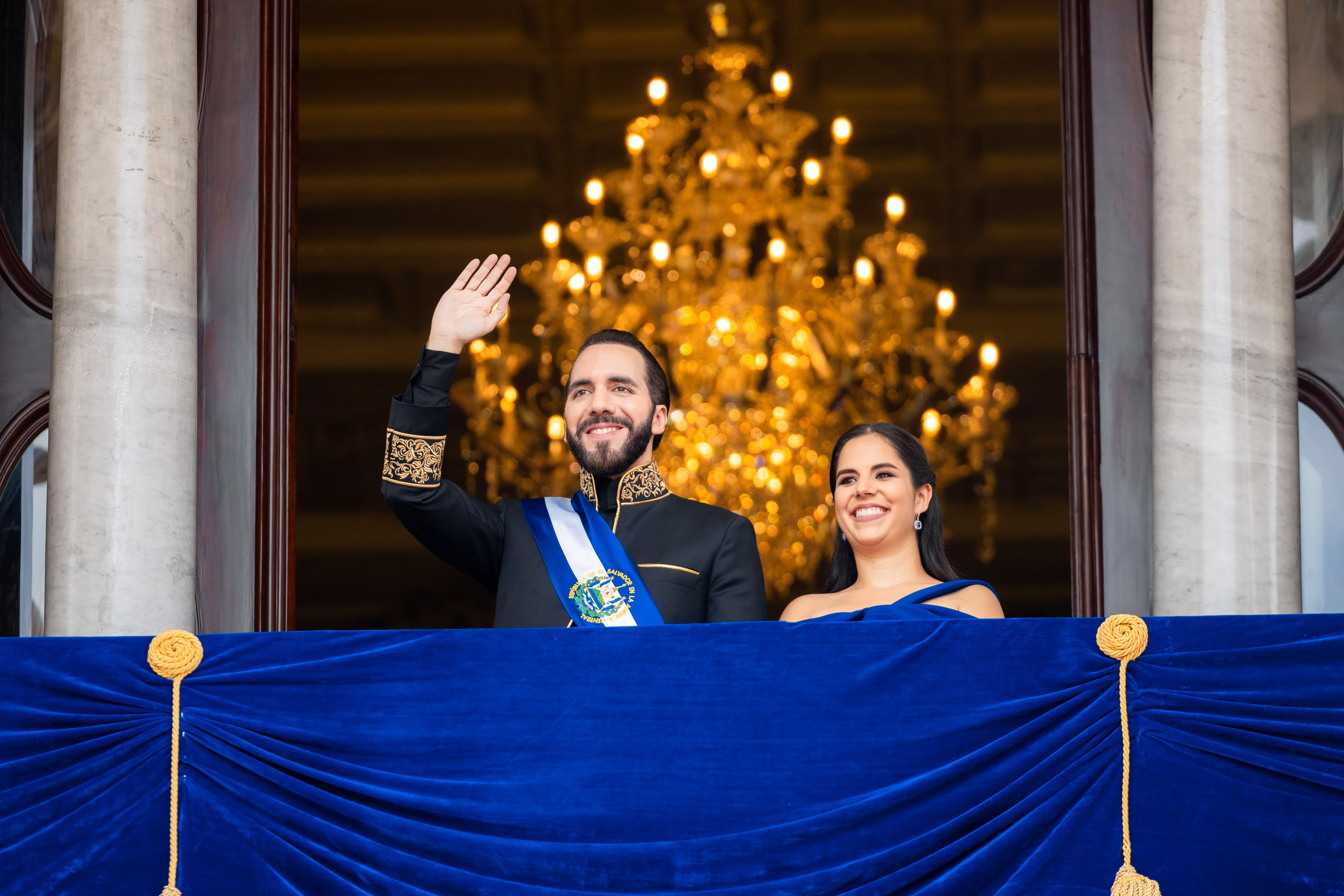
Bukele at his first (top) and second inaugurations

Bukele's first presidential inauguration was held on 1 June 2019. He became the 43rd president of El Salvador as well as the country's youngest president at the age of 37. Bukele held the inauguration ceremony at the National Palace due to its location in Gerardo Barrios Plaza (renovated by Bukele as mayor of San Salvador) instead of in the Blue Room (meeting room) of the Legislative Assembly in an effort to portray his presidency as focusing on the people. Bukele's supporters booed and jeered at the Legislative Assembly deputies as they were introduced. He announced a sixteen-person cabinet composed of eight men and eight women.

Bukele's second presidential inauguration was held on 1 June 2024, again at the National Palace. During the inauguration, the Armed Forces of El Salvador (FAES) staged a military parade as a show of force and Bukele wore a Napoleonic-cut jacket with gold trim to evoke the image of Venezuelan liberator Simón Bolívar. He described his second inauguration as "the most important moment in our recent history" ("el momento más importante de nuestra historia reciente").

=== Crime and prisons ===
During Bukele's presidential campaign, he promised to bring an end to gang violence in El Salvador; El Salvador was considered one of the world's most dangerous countries due to its gang violence. Most of El Salvador's violent crimes were committed by MS-13 and the 18th Street gang (Barrio 18). Although they are El Salvador's largest gangs, both originated in Los Angeles. MS-13 was formed in the 1980s by Salvadoran refugees fleeing El Salvador's civil war. The 18th Street gang was formed in the 1960s by Mexican immigrants. Much of the gang violence stemmed from income inequality, poverty, poor schools, a lack of job opportunities, and high urbanization.

El Salvador's homicide rate peaked at 107 homicides per 100,000 people in 2015. El Salvador's homicide rate had decreased to 38 homicides per 100,000 people by 2019, still one of the world's highest. Gangs controlled parts of El Salvador, and ordered business owners to pay renta (extortion) for protection or face violence. In early 2019, there were an estimated 67,000 gang members in El Salvador. During his presidency, Bukele enacted tough-on-crime policies that scholars have characterized as successfully reducing gang activity and violent crime, at the cost of arbitrary arrest and alleged widespread human rights abuses.

==== Territorial Control Plan ====
On 19 June 2019, Bukele announced that his government would implement a seven-phase security Territorial Control Plan that sought to disrupt gang finances. The plan began that night at midnight. Phase one, known as "preparation", called for members of the country's security forces — the Armed Forces of El Salvador and the National Civil Police (PNC) — to be stationed in 12 of the country's 262 municipalities at locations where gangs were known to collect renta. The government also implemented a temporary state of emergency in El Salvador's 28 prisons, putting them on lockdown and banning visitors.

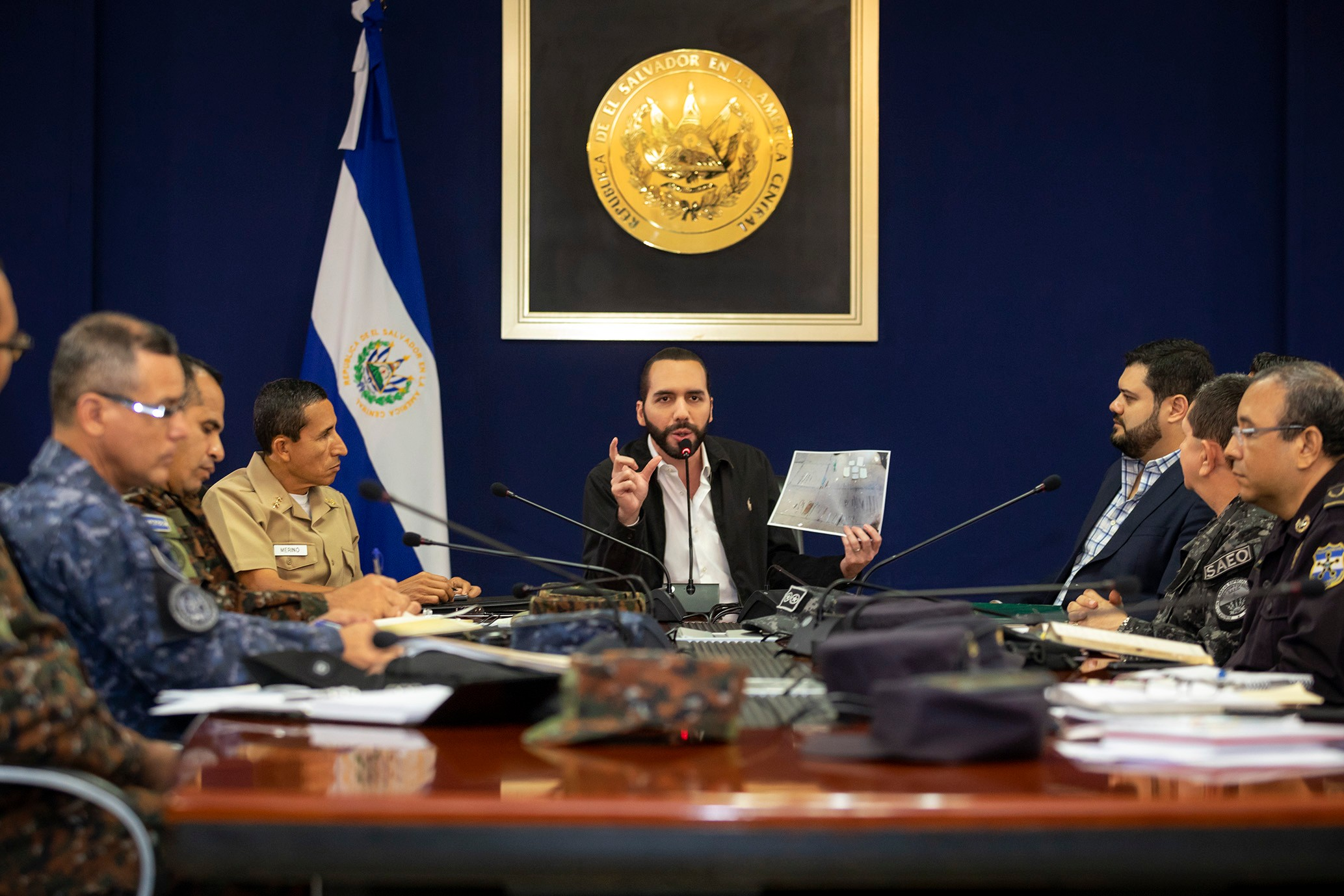
Bukele and members of his cabinet discussing phase two of the Territorial Control Plan, July 2019

Phase two of the plan, known as "Opportunity", began in July 2019 and called for the creation of programs and initiatives to prevent youths predisposed to crime from engaging in criminal activity. The programs and initiatives included creating scholarships, building schools and sports centers, and improving healthcare. Bukele established the Social Fabric Revitalization Unit to implement the phase. Phase three, known as "Modernization", began in August 2019 and called for the improvement of equipment used by the country's security forces; it included issuing new weapons, gear, helicopters, and drones to the security forces. Phase four, known as "Incursion", began in July 2021 when the security forces began patrolling areas with a high gang presence that were considered difficult to access.

Phase five, known as "extraction", began in November 2022. Security forces were ordered to "surround large cities and extract the terrorists [gang members] who [were] hiding within the communities, without giving them the slightest possibility of escape". Phase six, known as "integration", began in September 2023, when Bukele established the National Integration Directory to combat poverty and unemployment. Details about phase seven, which has not yet been implemented, are not publicly known.

El Salvador's homicide rate has decreased every year of Bukele's presidency, a downward trend that began in 2016. According to the Salvadoran government, the country's homicide rate was 38 per 100,000 people in 2019; 19.7 per 100,000 in 2020; 17.6 per 100,000 in 2021; 7.8 per 100,000 in 2022; 2.4 per 100,000 in 2023; and 1.9 per 100,000 in 2024. Bukele has attributed the decline to his security policies.

According to Celia Medrano, a human-rights lawyer and former general coordinator of the Commission for the Defense of Human Rights of Central America, it is "impossible" ("imposible") to verify the Salvadoran government's homicide figures because there is "no public access" ("no hay acceso público") to a daily homicide registry. Medrano stated that deaths in custody are not registered as homicides. Bodies found in mass graves, missing persons, and people killed in police encounters are not included in the government's homicide statistics. In July 2024, then former United States president Donald Trump falsely accused Bukele's government of "exporting" criminals to the United States to lower El Salvador's crime rate.

==== Alleged gang negotiations ====
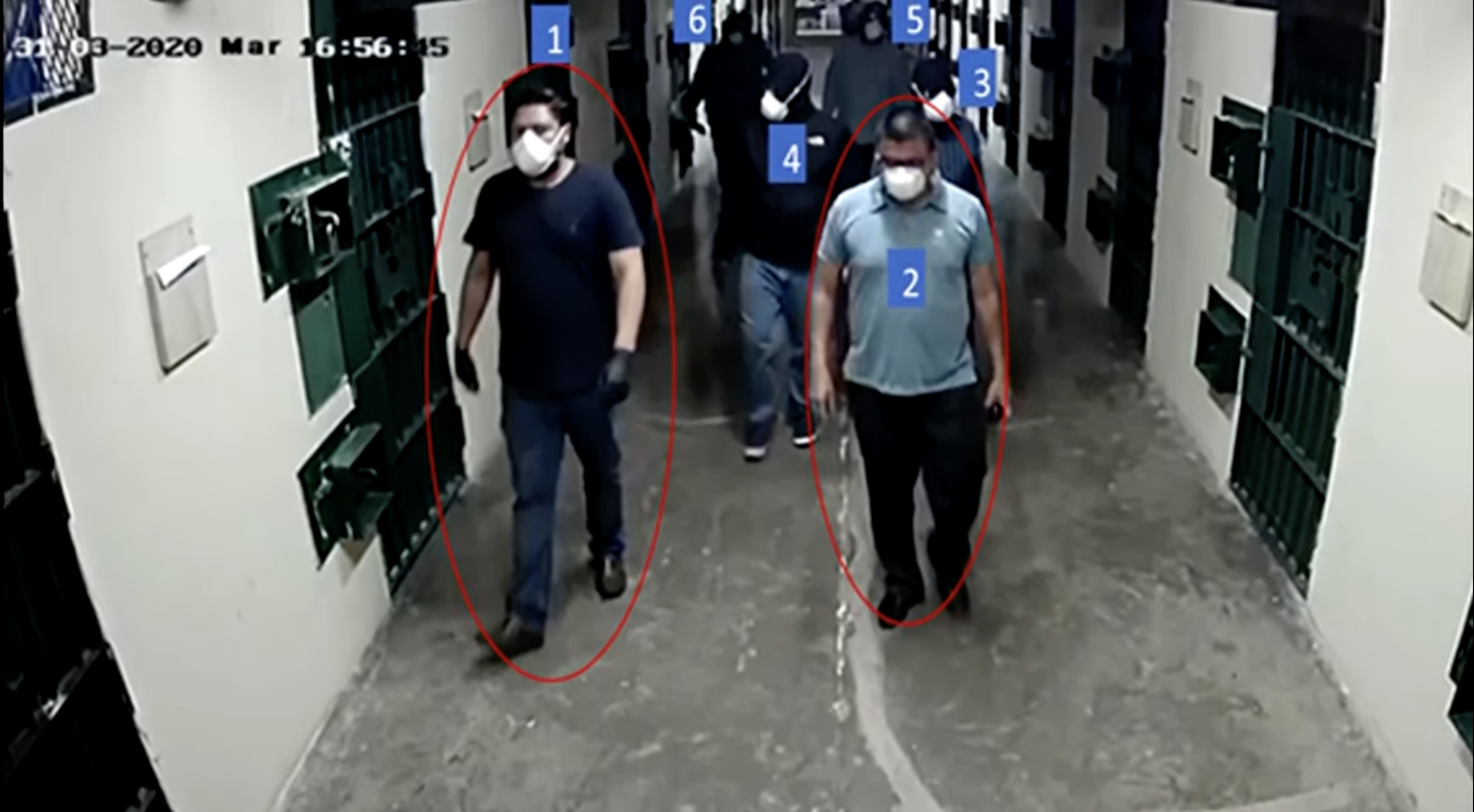
Video surveillance footage in a prison, reportedly of Osiris Luna (left, 1) during negotiations with gangs in March 2020

In July 2020, the International Crisis Group (ICG) published an analysis saying that the reason for the decrease in homicides during Bukele's first year in office hypothesized that "quiet, informal understandings" between the government and the gangs. The Salvadoran government denied the ICG's allegations, and the ICG stated that it had no evidence to support the claim.

In September 2020, the Salvadoran digital newspaper El Faro accused Bukele's government of conducting secret negotiations with MS-13. According to the El Faro report, the government agreed to grant MS-13 more freedom in prison in exchange for a reduction in homicides it would commit and support for Nuevas Ideas during the 2021 legislative elections. Bukele denied El Faro's allegations, posting photos on Twitter of gang members rounded up in cramped conditions from an April 2020 prison crackdown.

On 8 December 2021, the United States Department of the Treasury accused Bukele's government of secretly negotiating with MS-13 and Barrio 18 to lower the country's homicide rate. The department stated that Bukele's government "provided financial incentives" to both gangs to ensure that they would reduce the country's homicide rate and support Nuevas Ideas in the election held earlier that year, echoing El Faro's allegations the year before, and sanctioned Osiris Luna Meza (the general director of penal centers and vice-minister of justice) and Social Fabric Revitalization Unit chair Carlos Marroquín Chica for negotiating with the gangs.

Bukele denied the department's accusations, saying that the United States sought "absolute submission" from El Salvador rather than cooperation. The United States Department of Justice also accused Bukele's government of releasing gang leaders between 2019 and 2021 as a part of the negotiations, including Élmer "El Crook" Canales Rivera who was released in February 2021 despite having an active Interpol arrest warrant against him.

In June 2025, ProPublica reported that U.S. extradition requests of MS-13 leaders considered potential witnesses had been blocked by Bukele's government. The outlet also reported that a U.S. multiagency law enforcement team, Joint Task Force Vulcan, had previously gathered evidence that United States Agency for International Development (USAID) funds to El Salvador had been laundered and used to pay key MS-13 leaders.

==== Gang crackdown ====
From 25 to 27 March 2022, gangs in El Salvador committed 87 homicides; 62 were committed on 26 March alone, the deadliest day in Salvadoran history since the end of the Salvadoran Civil War (1979–1992). Florida International University research director José Miguel Cruz attributed the killings to a breakdown in a secret truce between the government and the gangs, a truce that Bukele has denied. Cruz believed that the killings were a message from the gangs to the government for more concessions as a part of the secret truce.

Avatar of Nayib Bukele

Nayib Bukele
(@nayibbukele)
tweeted:

MESSAGE TO THE GANGS: We have 16,000 "homeboys" in our power. Aside from the 1,000 arrested these days. We seized everything they had, even their mattresses, we've rationed their food, and now they won't see the sun. STOP KILLING NOW or they will pay too.

28 March 2022

On 27 March 2022, the Legislative Assembly declared a 30-day state of emergency, formally known as a "state of exception" ("régimen de excepción") and sometimes known as the "war on gangs". The state of emergency suspended constitutional rights that included freedom of assembly, freedom of association, the right to privacy in communication, the right to be informed of the reason for arrest, the right to remain silent, and the right to legal representation. The requirement for any arrested individual to see a judge within 72 hours of arrest was also suspended.

The military was mobilized in neighborhoods controlled by gangs in an effort to reassert government control, and made large-scale arrests of suspected gang members across the country. On several occasions, Bukele ordered security forces to blockade certain municipalities to capture all gang members within them. By October 2024, blockades were implemented twice in Apopa, Cabañas, Comasagua, Nuevo Concepción, San Marcos, southern Chalatenango, and Soyapango.

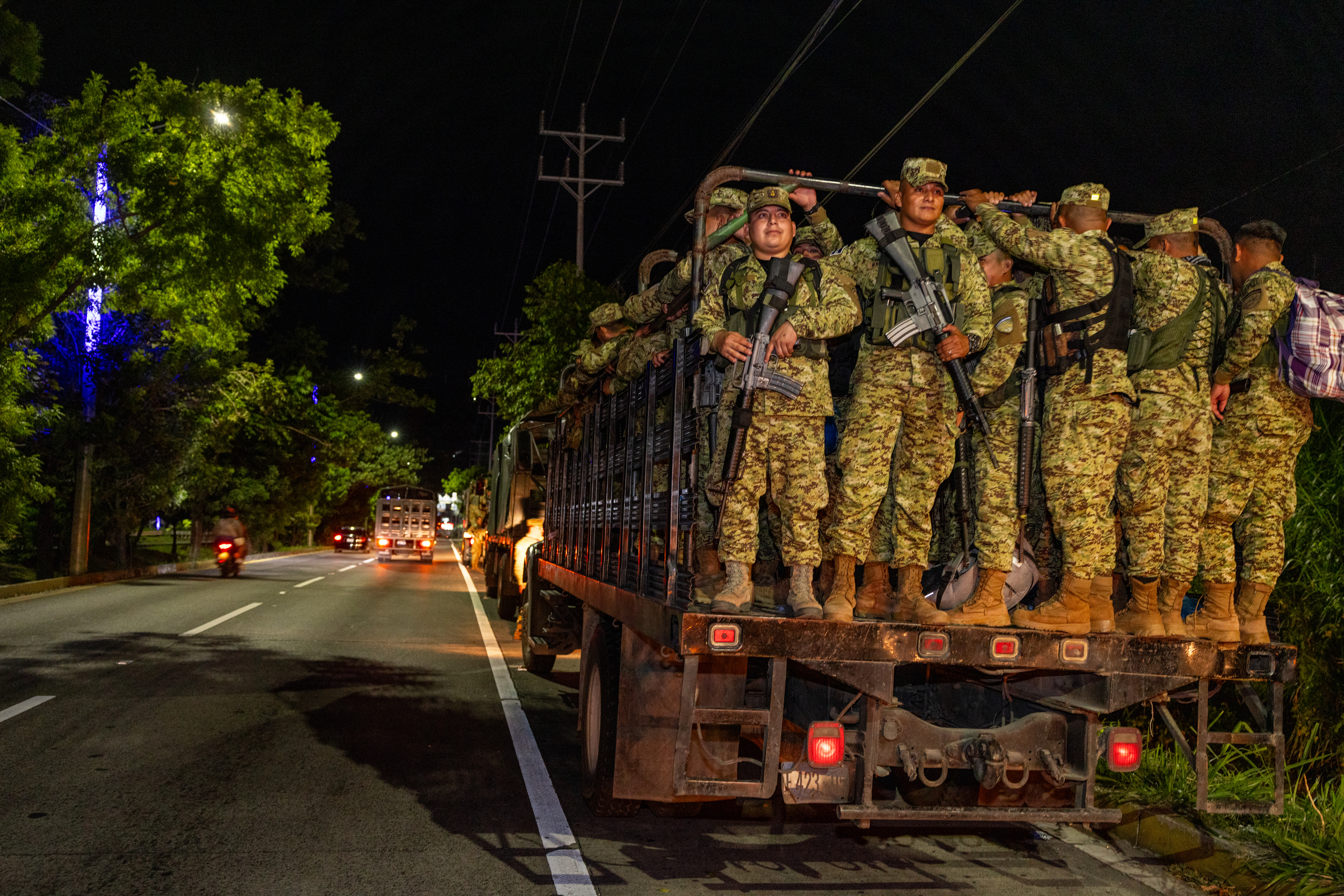
Soldiers in a truck in San Marcos during the October 2024 blockade of that city

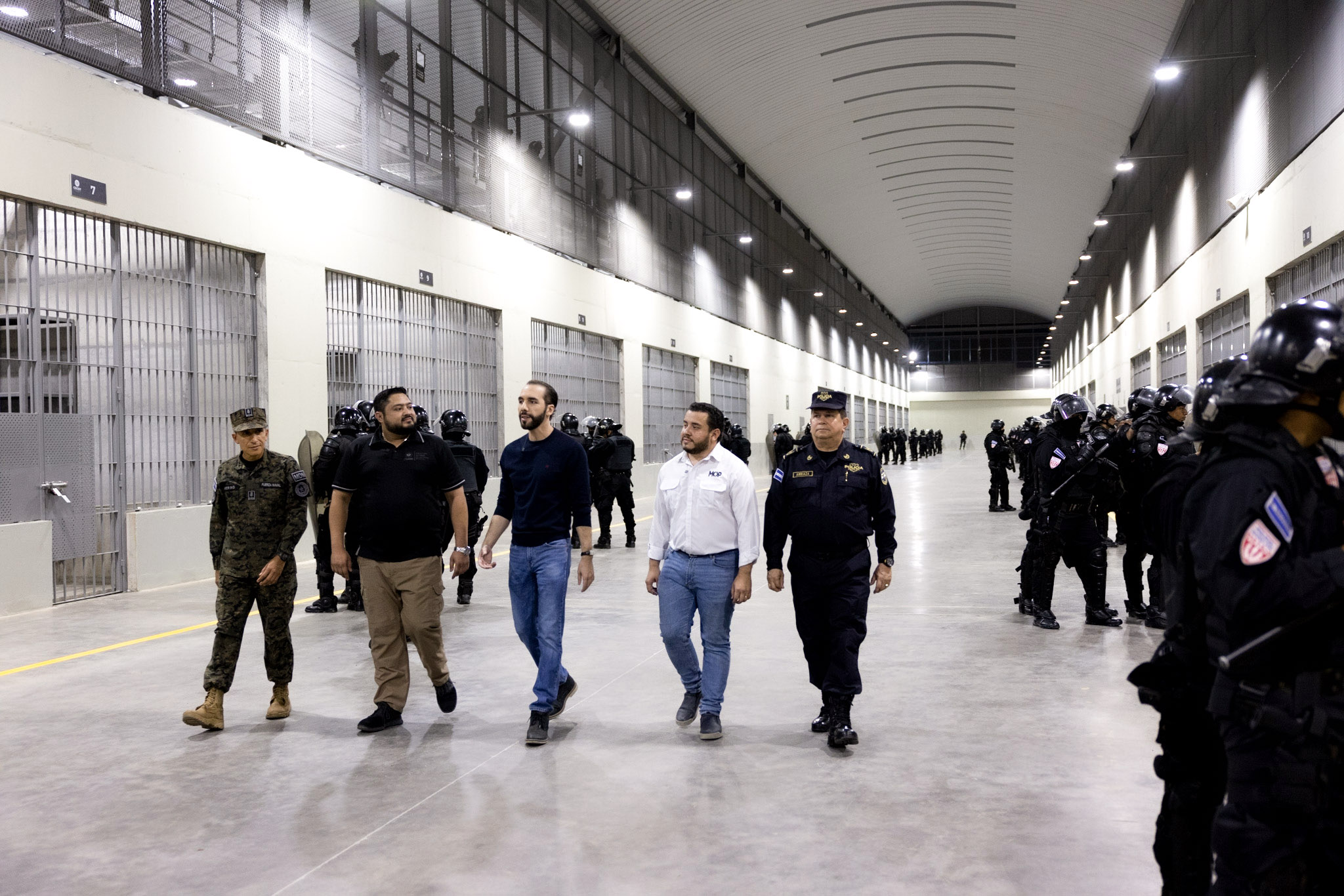
Bukele and government officials touring a cell block in the Terrorism Confinement Center, March 2022

Bukele has threatened incarcerated gang members. At the beginning of the crackdown, he tweeted that the government had seized incarcerated gang members' belongings, removed their mattresses, and rationed their food. Bukele also posted a video of prisoners sleeping on floors and complaining about a lack of food and sanitation. He threatened to deprive them of food entirely in April 2022 if the gangs attempted to retaliate against the crackdown, citing rumors about revenge killings.

After members of Barrio 18 killed three police officers in Santa Ana in June 2022, Bukele said at a press conference that the gangs were "going to pay dearly" for the "ambush" against the police. The government began destroying gravestones belonging to deceased gang members in November 2022 to prevent them from becoming "shrines" and Bukele compared the gravestone destructions to denazification in post-World War II Germany. He warned Salvadoran parents to keep their children away from gangs, since they would lead to "prison or death".

Shortly after the crackdown began, Bukele called for the construction of a new 20,000-inmate prison. He announced the construction in July 2022 of the 40,000-inmate Terrorism Confinement Center (CECOT) in Tecoluca, that would be one of the world's largest prisons. In February 2023, Bukele posted a video on Twitter of him and members of his cabinet touring the prison. It is staffed by 250 police officers and 600 soldiers, and covers 410 acres (170 ha). Bukele posted a video on Twitter on 24 February 2023 of the transfer of the prison's first 2,000 prisoners, and posted a similar video the following month of the transfer of 2,000 more prisoners. By 11 June 2024, CECOT had at least 14,532 inmates. At least 427 people have died in Salvadoran prisons since Bukele's declaration of a state of emergency.

In July 2023, Bukele's government passed a law formalizing the judicial system's existing practice of mass trials by judge, allowing up to 900 people to be convicted in the same trial, without a jury. In March 2026, the Legislative Assembly approved a constitutional amendment to permit life imprisonment for individuals convicted of murder, rape, or terrorism. Before the amendment was passed, Bukele wrote on social media that "we will see who supports this reform and who will dare to argue that the constitution should continue to prohibit murderers and rapists from remaining in prison".

Liz Throssell, a spokeswoman for the Office of the United Nations High Commissioner for Human Rights, called the actions of El Salvador's security forces during the gang crackdown an "unnecessary and excessive use of force". Human Rights Watch stated in May 2022 that there was "mounting evidence" and "credible allegations" that Salvadoran authorities were committing human rights violations such as arbitrary arrests, enforced disappearances, false confessions, and deaths in police custody during the gang crackdown. Amnesty International stated the following month that the Salvadoran government had committed "massive human rights violations", including torture, against prisoners.

In June 2024, Bukele told Time that the security situation in El Salvador had become sustainable and that he and his government hoped to end the state of emergency "in the near future". By 4 March 2025, the state of exception had been extended 36 times by the Legislative Assembly. By that same date, over 85,000 suspected gang members had been arrested, 3,319 of whom were minors according to Human Rights Watch. The large-scale arrests increased El Salvador's prison population from 37,190 in 2020 to over 105,000 by December 2023. With 1.7 percent of its population in prison, El Salvador has the highest incarceration rate in the world. By November 2024, more than 8,000 people had been released after the government determined that they were innocent. According to human rights organizations, at least 367 people had died in custody by March 2025. A number of opinion polls between May 2022 and June 2023 indicated that 80 to 90 percent of Salvadorans approved of the gang crackdown and measures taken by the government against the gangs.

=== Political crises ===
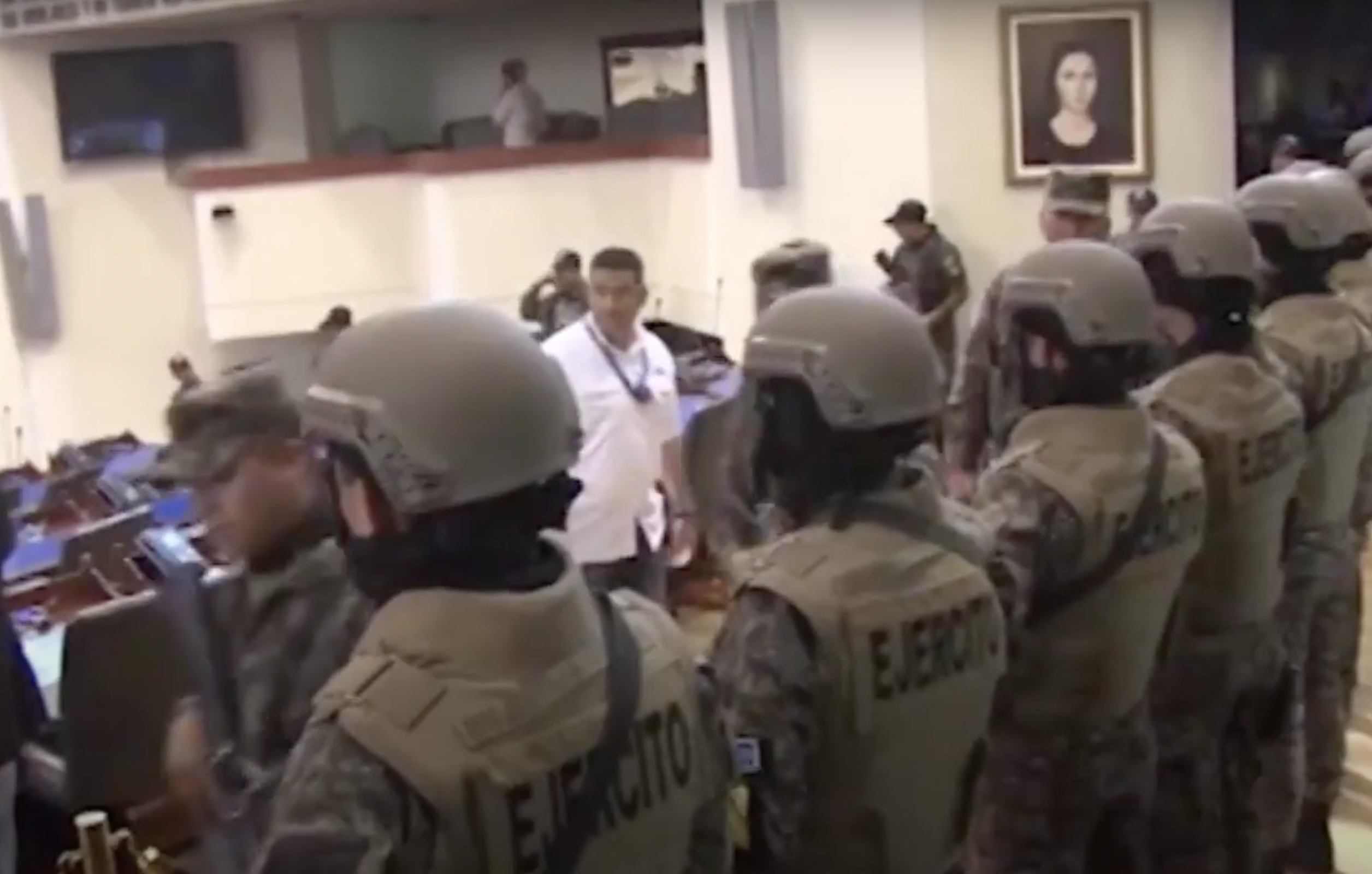
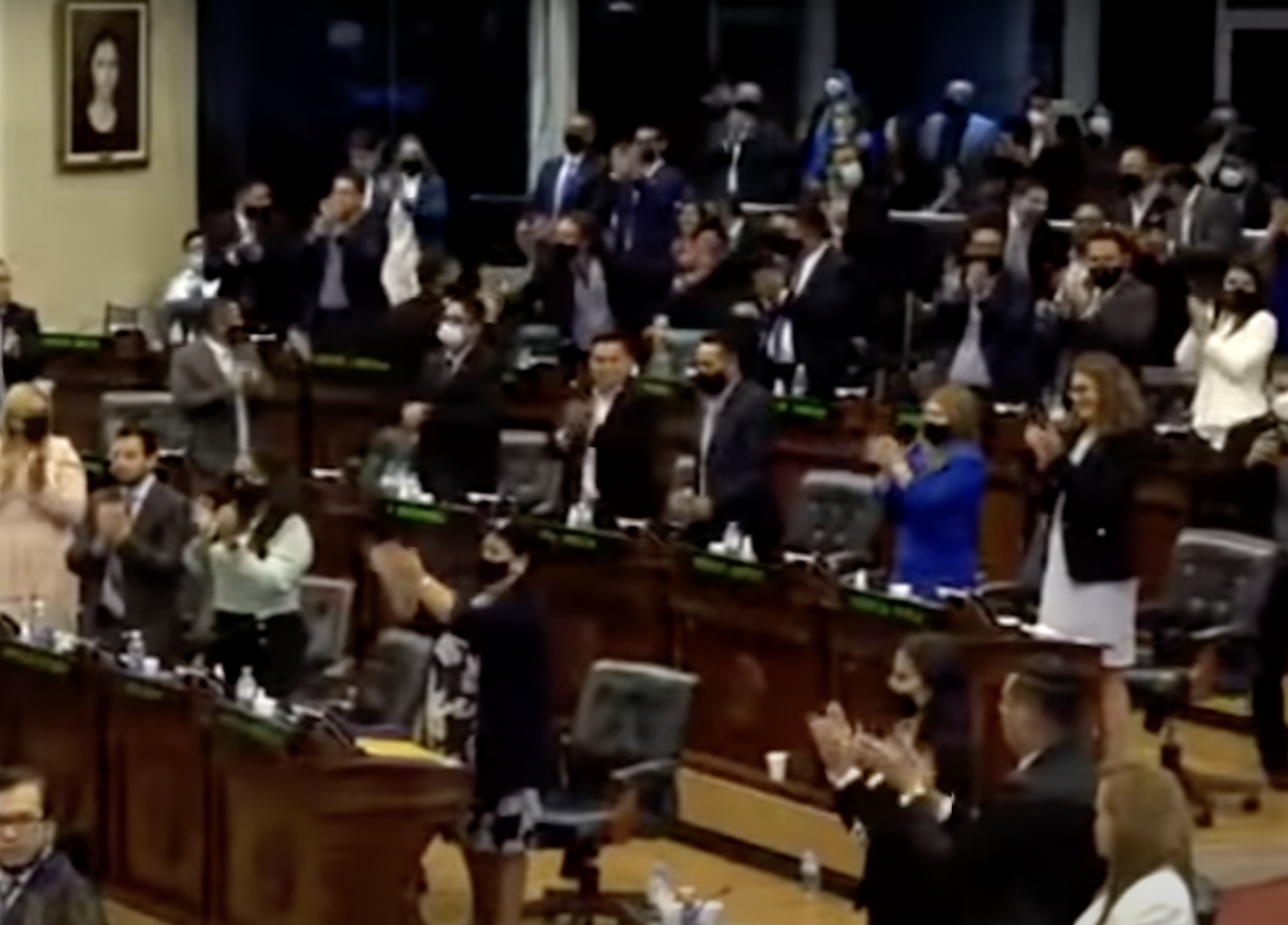
The 2020 (top) and 2021 crises are known by the numeronyms "9F" and "1M", respectively.

In November 2019, Bukele's administration began trying to secure a $109 million loan from the Central American Bank for Economic Integration to fund phase three of the Territorial Control Plan. The legislature, which was controlled by ARENA and the FMLN, asked him to give them more time to evaluate the loan. On 6 February 2020, Bukele invoked Article 167 of the country's constitution and called for an emergency meeting of the Legislative Assembly to approve the loan. He called for his supporters to rally around the Legislative Assembly during the emergency meeting that was scheduled for 9 February. Although Bukele ordered 40 soldiers into the Legislative Assembly's meeting room on the day of the meeting to coerce legislators into approving the loan, a quorum was not reached and the loan was not approved. Opposition politicians described the crisis as a "self-coup", and it is known in El Salvador as "9F" or "El Bukelazo".

In the 2021 legislative elections, Nuevas Ideas received a supermajority in the Legislative Assembly. On 1 May 2021, Nuevas Ideas formed a coalition government with GANA, the National Coalition Party (PCN), and the Christian Democratic Party (PDC). That day, the coalition voted to remove the five justices of the Supreme Court of Justice's constitutional court and Attorney General Raúl Melara. The justices were replaced by five of Bukele's allies, and Melara was replaced by Rodolfo Delgado. The purge, known in El Salvador as "1M", was described by journalists and opposition politicians as a "self-coup" and a "power grab" and was condemned by the United States.

=== COVID-19 pandemic ===
Bukele issued an executive decree on 11 March 2020 imposing a "quarantine throughout the national territory" ("cuarentena en todo el territorio nacional"), shortly after World Health Organization (WHO) director-general Tedros Adhanom Ghebreyesus declared the COVID-19 outbreak a pandemic. The quarantine suspended all school activities for 21 days, prohibited foreigners from entering the country, and mandated a 30-day quarantine for everyone entering the country. Bukele confirmed the first case of COVID-19 in El Salvador on 18 March 2020. The country's first death from the disease was recorded on 31 March. On 5 May 2023, the Pan American Health Organization declared the end of the pandemic. According to the WHO, As of 27 September 2023, El Salvador had 201,807 confirmed cases of COVID-19 and 4,230 deaths from the disease by 2 June 2023; the WHO reported that 11,426,688 doses of the COVID-19 vaccine had been administered in El Salvador by that date.

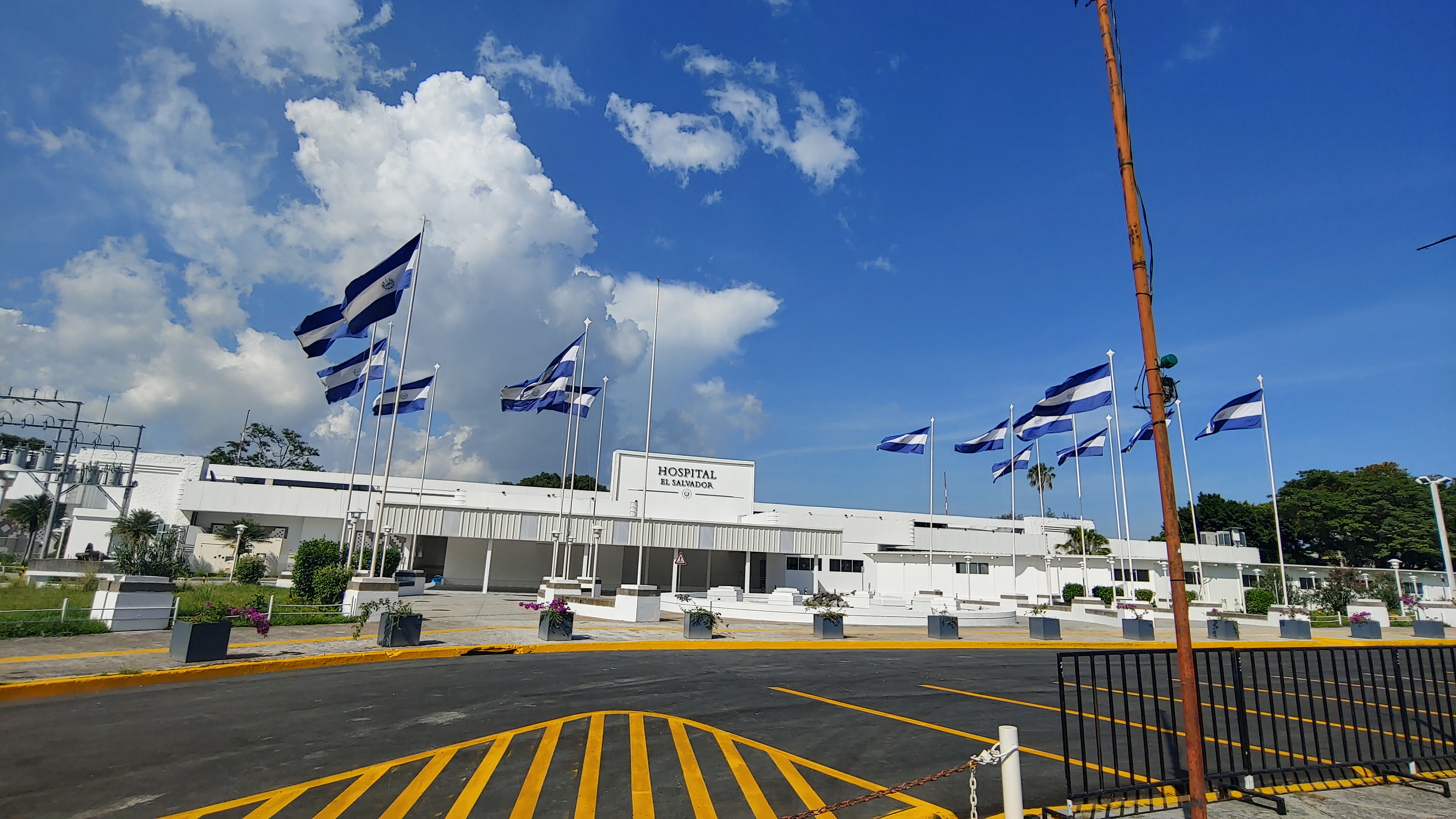
Entrance of Hospital El Salvador

On 21 March 2020, Bukele imposed a 30-day nationwide lockdown in an effort to combat the pandemic. During the lockdown, 4,236 people were arrested by the National Civil Police for violating the lockdown order; 70 were arrested before the lockdown order became public. The arrestees were quarantined in a "containment center". Human rights organizations such as Human Rights Watch criticized the arrests, citing instances of arbitrary arrests and abuse by police. Amid April 2020 lockdowns in the country's prisons and published images of prisoners lined up in cramped positions, Human Rights Watch called the prisons' living conditions "inhumane" (particularly in light of the pandemic).

On 27 May 2020, the United States donated 250 ventilators to El Salvador. During a press conference where Bukele received the ventilators, he said that he took hydroxychloroquine as prophylaxis and added that "most of the world's leaders use [hydroxychloroquine] as a prophylaxis". Bukele inaugurated the Hospital El Salvador, the largest hospital in Latin America used exclusively for treating cases of COVID-19 at the site of the former International Center for Fairs and Conventions, on 22 June 2020. The hospital had a capacity of 400 beds, 105 intensive-care units, and 295 intermediate-care units staffed by 240 doctors. In August 2020, the hospital's capacity was increased by 575 beds. It began treating conditions other than COVID-19 by June 2022. In April 2021, Bukele inaugurated a vaccination center at Hospital El Salvador to administer up to 10,000 doses of the COVID-19 vaccine per day; the center closed in August 2022, as dose administrations diminished.

Most of El Salvador's COVID-19 vaccines were donated by the United States and China. On 13 May 2021, Bukele donated 34,000 doses of the COVID-19 vaccine to seven towns in Honduras after pleas from their mayors for vaccine doses. El Salvador had received 1.9 million doses at the time, and Honduras had only received 59,000. Gabriel Labrador, a journalist for El Faro, told El País that Bukele made the donation to Honduras to improve his public image in Central America.

=== Economy ===
==== Adoption of bitcoin ====
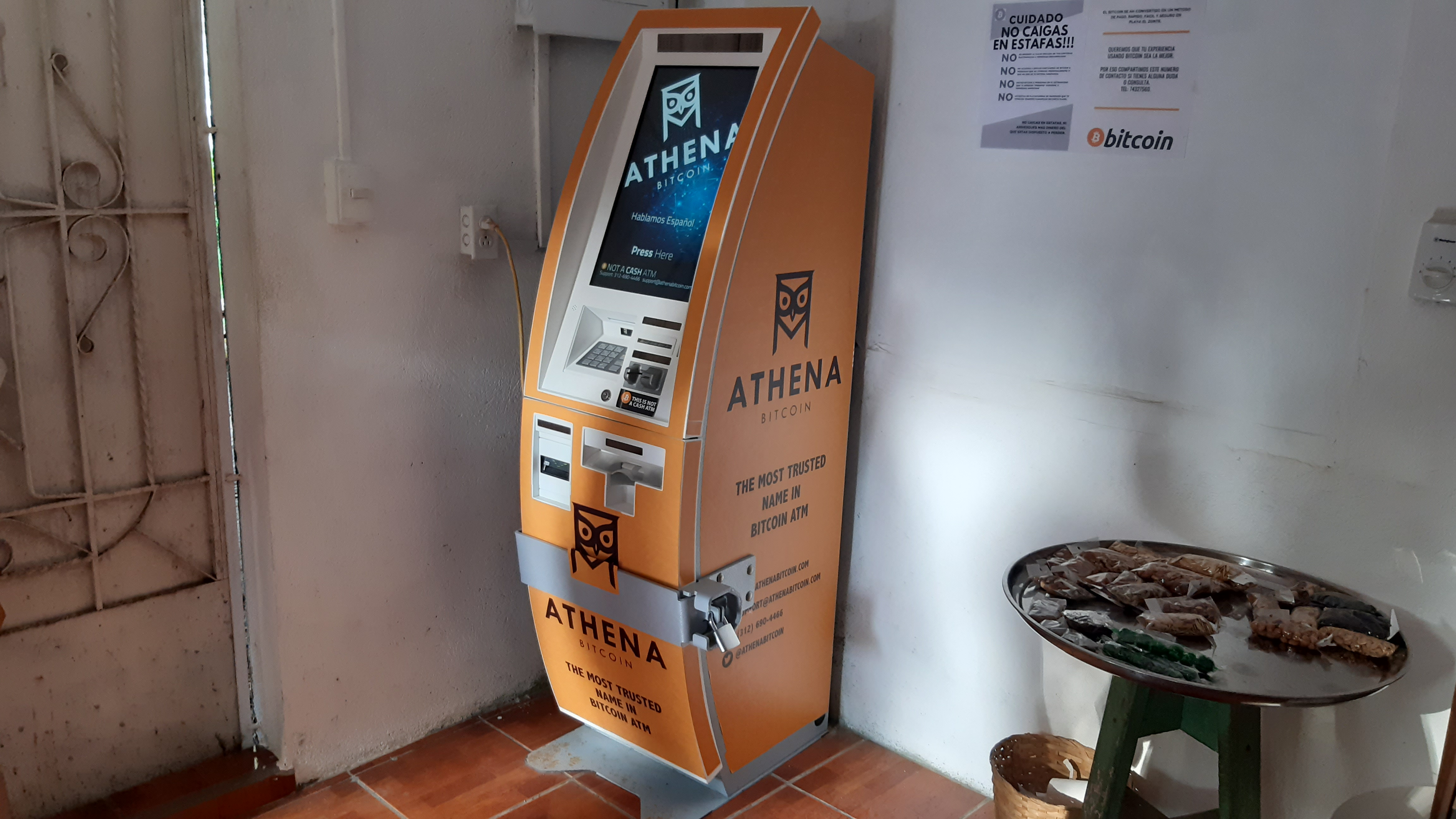
An Athena Bitcoin ATM in El Zonte

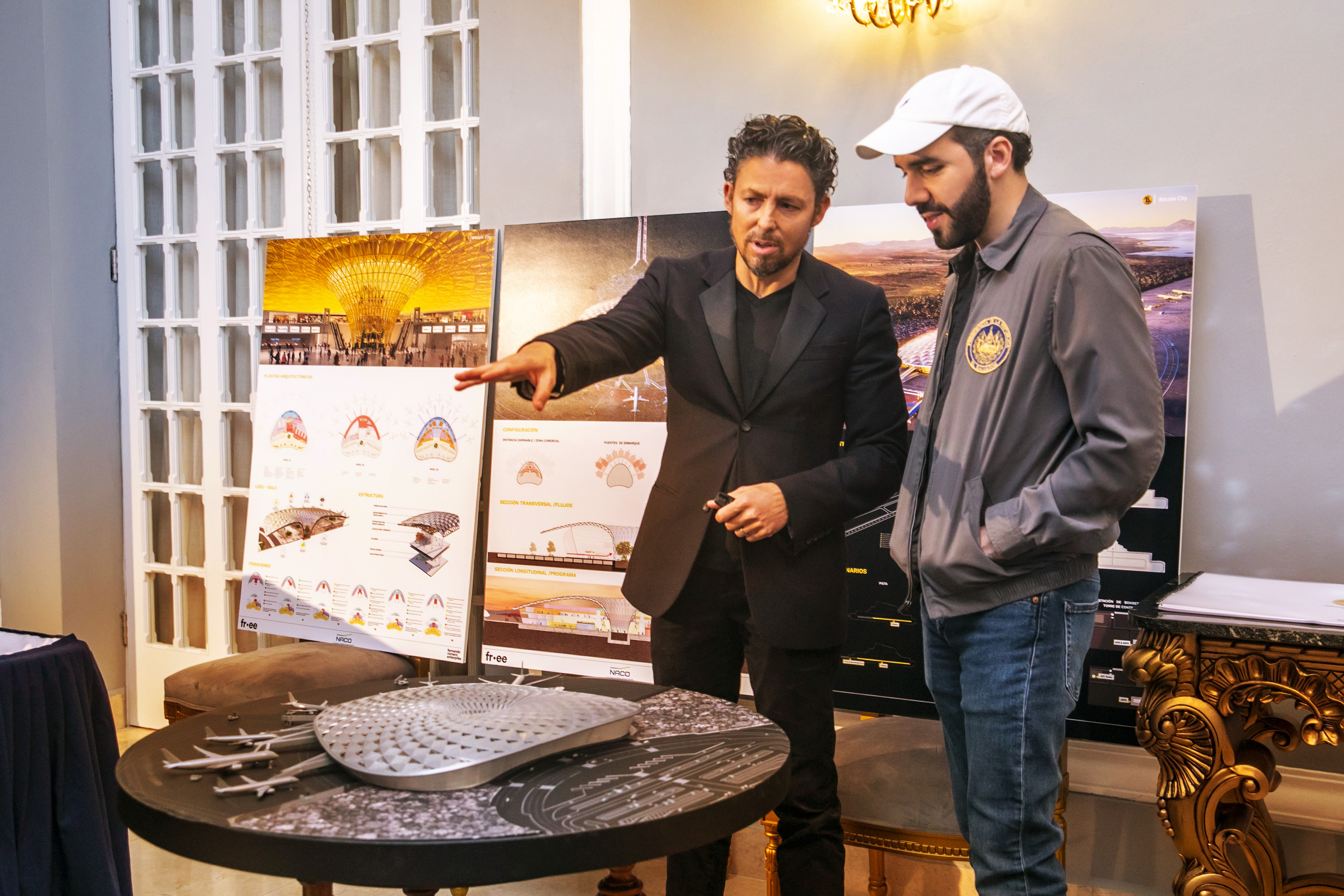
Bukele and Mexican architect Fernando Romero with a model of the planned Bitcoin City airport

Bukele announced at the Bitcoin 2021 conference on 5 June 2021 that he would introduce a bill to the Legislative Assembly that would make bitcoin legal tender, saying that it would "generate jobs" and promote "financial inclusion" in the short term. The Legislative Assembly approved the bill three days later. Although the World Bank rejected a request from the Salvadoran government to assist it with the implementation of bitcoin as legal tender, citing concerns about transparency and the environmental effects of bitcoin mining, Athena Bitcoin announced that it would invest $1 million to install 1,500 bitcoin ATMs. This would allow users to exchange U.S. dollars for bitcoin and vice versa.

Bitcoin became legal tender on 7 September 2021 in El Salvador, the first country to do so. It became legal tender alongside the United States dollar, which had been adopted in 2001 and replaced the Salvadoran colón. About 1,000 people marched in the streets of San Salvador to protest the country's adoption of bitcoin, though other citizens saw the adoption as an "opportunity." According to The New York Times, bitcoin adoption has allowed Salvadorans without bank accounts to "access digital payments, invest savings or boost earnings."

The day before bitcoin became legal tender, Bukele announced that the Salvadoran government had bought its first 200 bitcoins. Economist Steve Hanke stated that El Salvador had "the most distressed sovereign debt in the world" due to its adoption of bitcoin, and other economists predicted that the country would likely default on its debt. As the price of bitcoin rose to $44,000 in December 2023, Bukele announced that El Salvador's investment into bitcoin had broken even. In March 2024, he stated that El Salvador had made a 50-percent profit from bitcoin. Bukele mocked news-media outlets on Twitter, saying that there were "literally thousands of articles" about El Salvador's bitcoin losses and the same outlets were now "totally silent". By 19 January 2025, the Salvadoran government had 6,043 bitcoins worth $611.2 million.

In November 2021, Bukele announced that he planned to build Bitcoin City in the southeastern region of La Unión at the base of the Conchagua volcano. The city would use geothermal energy to power bitcoin mining. Ricardo Navarro, head of the Salvadoran Center of Appropriate Technology, criticized the plan, adding that it would result in an "environmental disaster". Bukele published images of models of Bitcoin City and its planned airport on Twitter in May 2022, saying that the city would have "no income tax, zero property tax, no procurement tax, zero city tax, and zero CO2 emissions". In December 2023, the Legislative Assembly passed a law that allowed individuals to purchase Salvadoran citizenship by donating bitcoins to El Salvador.

On 18 December 2024, the International Monetary Fund (IMF) agreed to give El Salvador a $1.4 billion loan in exchange for the Salvadoran government making some concessions from the Bitcoin Law. Concessions included not requiring businesses to accept bitcoin as payment, not accepting bitcoin as tax payments, and reducing the number of bitcoins the government was purchasing. The day after the loan was approved, Stacy Herbert, the director of the National Bitcoin Office, stated that El Salvador would continue to buy bitcoins at an "accelerated rate" ("ritmo acelerado") and the government purchased 11 bitcoins then worth over $1 million in total. On 29 January 2025, the Salvadoran government amended the Bitcoin Law to remove bitcoin's status as legal tender and currency but still allows its use as payment.

In March 2025, The Economist wrote that El Salvador's bitcoin experiment had been a failure, bringing more costs than benefits to the Salvadoran economy.

In 2025, the Salvadoran economy strengthened to 3.9% GDP growth from 2.6 the previous year with private investment growing 36%.

==== Economic Plan ====
During Bukele's second inauguration, he stated that his second term would focus on improving the Salvadoran economy with "bitter medicine" ("medicina amarga"). In July 2024, Bukele threatened to mass-arrest vendors, importers, and distributors who engaged in price gouging. Later that month, he announced the beginning of a six-phase Economic Plan ("Plan Económico"). Phase one, known as "Feeding" ("Alimentación"), involved the establishment of 30 food distribution centers and the removal of tariffs on certain agricultural imports for ten years. Phase two, known as "Technology" ("Tecnología"), involved the construction of data centers and technological parks in El Salvador. Bukele stated that his Economic Plan would create 4,000 jobs. Phase three, known as "Logistics" ("Logística"), involved the investment of US$1.6 billion into modernizing the ports of Acajutla and La Unión and the Turkish company Yılport Holdings operating the ports for 50 years.

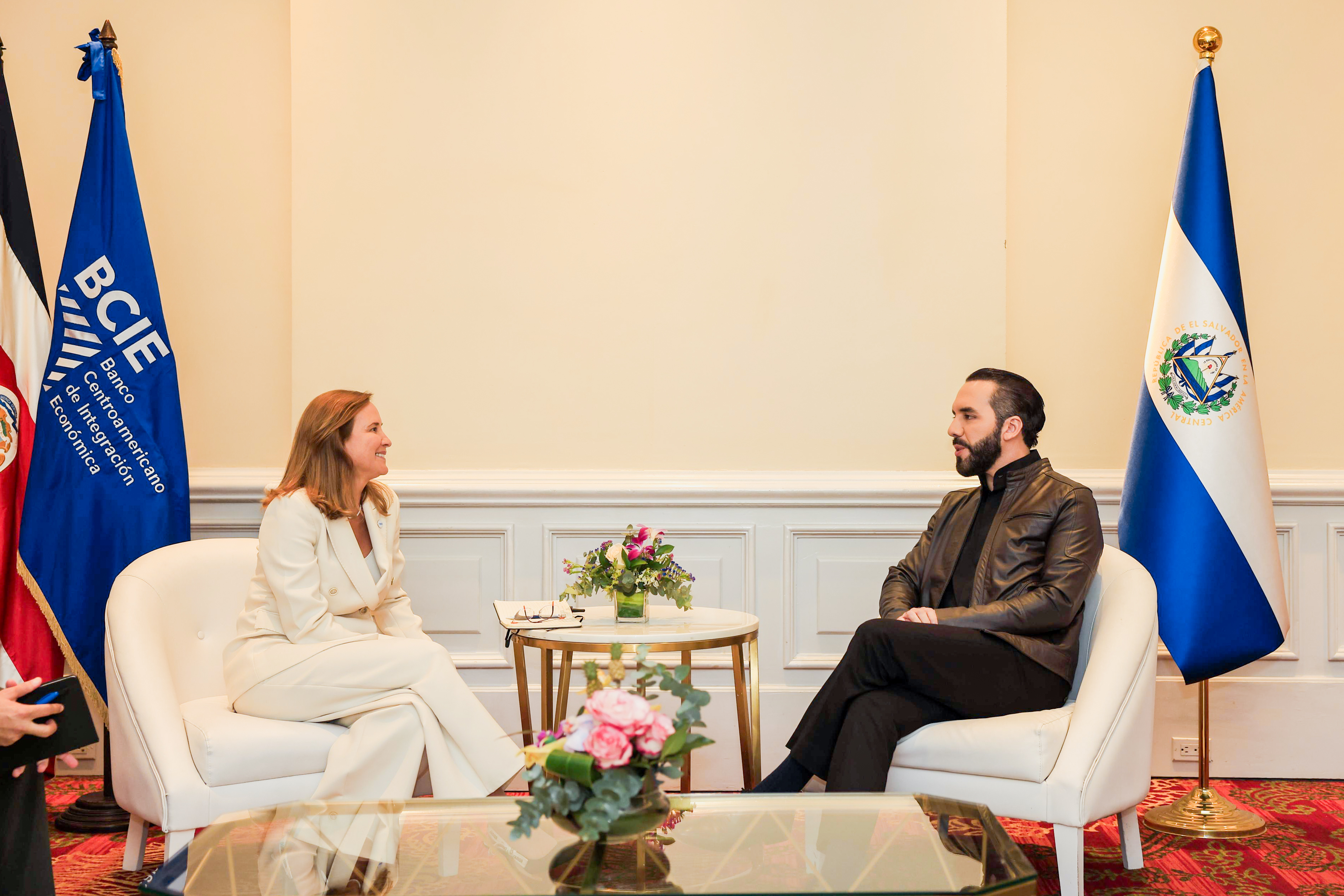
Bukele with Gisela Sánchez, the president of the Central American Bank for Economic Integration

On 15 September 2024, Bukele stated that his 2025 government budget would not include "a single cent of debt for current spending" ("solo centavo de deuda para gasto corriente") and that his government would not take out foreign loans to pay for the budget. On 16 October, El Salvador and J.P. Morgan & Co. agreed to restructure US$1.03 billion of the country's debt as a part of a debt-for-nature swap, which Bukele described as "reaffirm[ing] this government's commitment to economic growth". In the agreement, El Salvador would allocate US$352 million in savings towards conserving the environment around the Lempa River. On three occasions in 2024, Bukele offered to buy back billions of dollars worth of government bonds due by 2034.

In November 2024, the Central American Bank for Economic Integration announced that it would give the Salvadoran government $646 million to finance infrastructure projects. Bukele stated that the bank's support would help El Salvador's "economic takeoff" ("despegue económico"). Later that month, Bukele wrote on X that he supported mining gold, describing it as "wealth that could transform El Salvador". He further described the country's metal mining ban as "absurd". The Catholic Church, which supported the mining ban's implementation in 2017, called on Bukele to not repeal the ban, citing environmental concerns. The Legislative Assembly repealed the ban on 23 December 2024 and Bukele approved the law that same day. In 2025, at least 2,500 unlicensed street vendors were evicted from downtown San Salvador as part of Bukele's economic revitalization plan.

=== Foreign policy ===
Bukele stated in June 2019 that his government would no longer recognize Nicolás Maduro as the president of Venezuela, instead recognizing Juan Guaidó as Venezuela's legitimate president during Venezuela's presidential crisis. On 3 November of that year, he expelled Maduro-appointed Venezuelan diplomats from El Salvador. Bukele considers Maduro to be a dictator. Bukele rejected the results of the 2024 Venezuelan presidential election as a "fraud" ("fraude") and stated that he would not restore relations with Venezuela unless there were "real elections" ("elecciones de verdad").

Bukele refused to recognize the presidency of Manuel Merino in Peru in November 2020, calling Merino's government "putschist" ("golpista"). He and the Legislative Assembly denounced the results of the 2021 Nicaraguan general election, that were seen by several governments as fraudulent. El Salvador has abstained from resolutions critical of Nicaragua at the Organization of American States since 2022, with Bukele's government citing "non-interference" ("no injerencia") as justification. In 2024, El Salvador was the only country to abstain on an OAS resolution to condemn Ecuador for raiding the Mexican embassy in Quito to arrest former Ecuadorian vice president Jorge Glas.

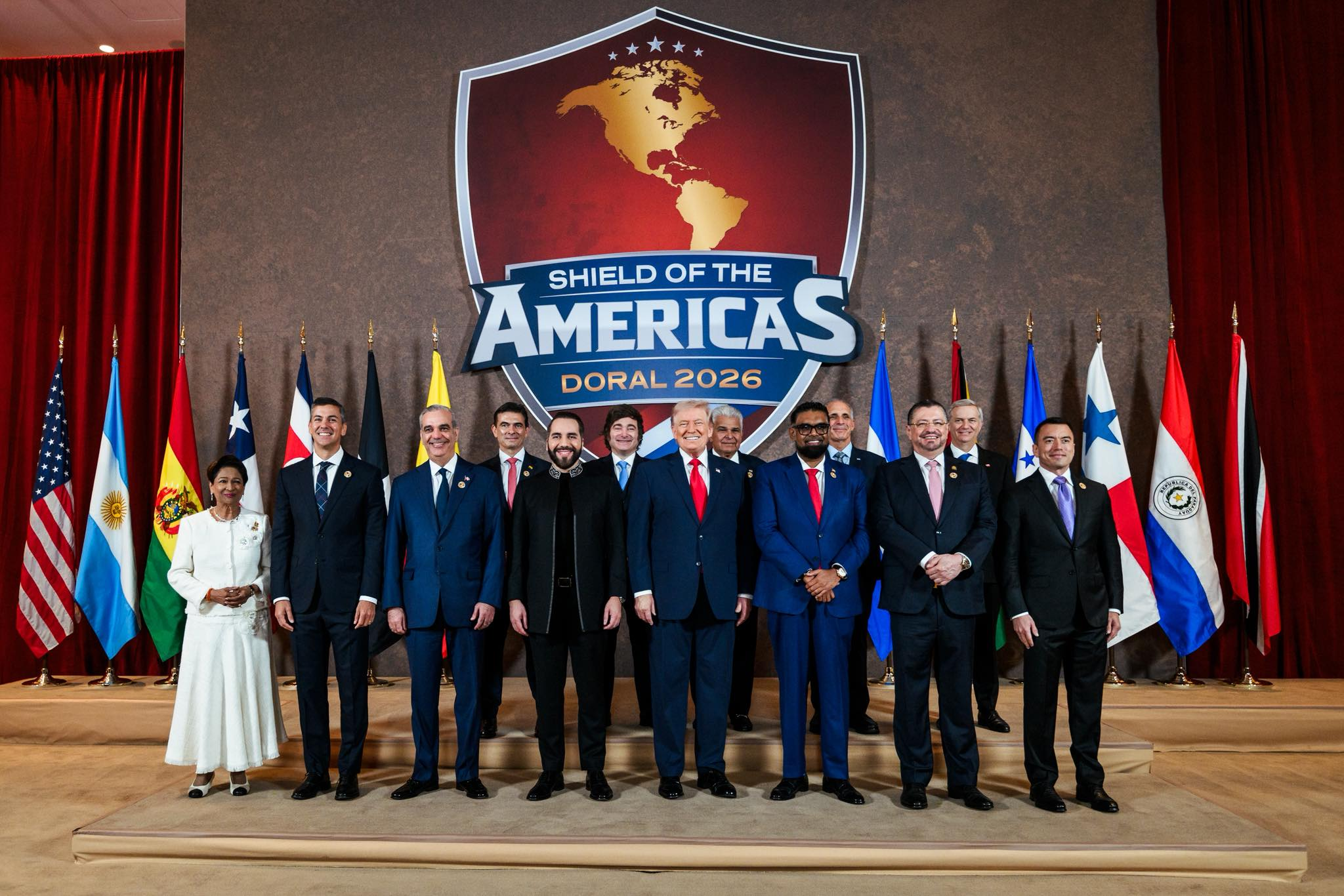
Bukele at the Shield of the Americas summit in March 2026

In February 2022, Bukele accused United States president Joe Biden of "crying wolf" about a Russian invasion of Ukraine. Bukele did not comment on the invasion when it began later that month, posting instead on Twitter about bitcoin and bonds. Throughout 2022, El Salvador abstained from votes on United Nations resolutions condemning the Russian invasion of Ukraine. Bukele condemned the 7 October attacks, describing Hamas as "savage beasts" who "do not represent the Palestinians", comparing the group to MS-13. He tweeted that "the best thing that could happen to the Palestinian people is for Hamas to completely disappear".

In March 2024, Bukele offered to send a mission to Haiti to "fix" the country's gang war with United Nations Security Council support. In October 2024, El Salvador agreed to provide soldiers to conduct street patrols and aerial surveillance for the Multinational Security Support Mission in Haiti, and the first Salvadoran soldiers arrived in Port-au-Prince on 3 January 2025. In March 2026, Bukele attended the Shield of the Americas summit in Miami along with several other Latin American leaders.

==== Relations with the United States ====
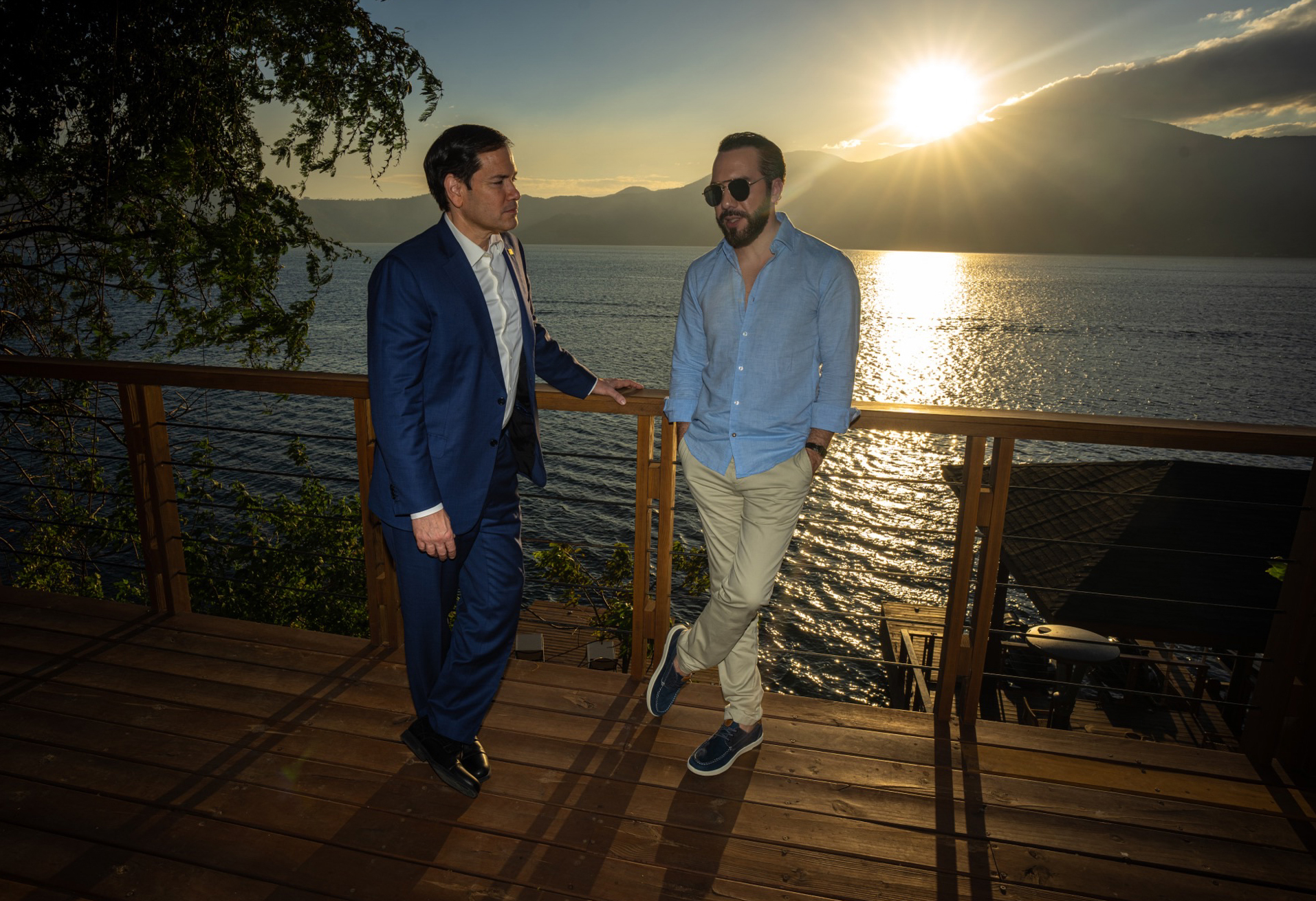
Bukele and U.S. Secretary of State Marco Rubio in February 2025

During Bukele's September 2019 meeting with Trump, Bukele called on Trump to promote legal migration in an effort to combat illegal immigration and to maintain the United States' temporary protected status (TPS) policy for Salvadorans living in the United States. The following month, Bukele confirmed that the United States would continue TPS for Salvadorans. In February 2021, Biden refused to meet Bukele when he arrived unannounced in Washington, D.C. to meet him. Bukele did not attend the 9th Summit of the Americas in June 2022 due to frustration with the U.S. government's allegations of corruption and human rights abuses by his government.

Some Democratic Party members have been critical of Bukele's government, and members of the Republican Party have supported him and his policies. Bukele and Norma Torres, a member of the U.S. Congress representing California's 35th congressional district, engaged in an April 2021 argument on Twitter about illegal immigration at the United States' southern border. Torres accused Bukele in November 2022 of interfering in that month's 35th congressional district election by endorsing Republican challenger Mike Cargile. In January 2024, fourteen Democratic members of Congress sent a letter to Biden about Bukele's "authoritarian" actions. Meanwhile, Republican congressmen such as Tom Cotton, Matt Gaetz, and Marco Rubio have praised Bukele's policies on crime.

The second Trump administration considers Bukele to be an important ally in mitigating immigration to the U.S. from Central America. In February 2025, Bukele offered Secretary of State Rubio to accept non-Salvadoran deportees from the United States, including convicted American prisoners "of U.S. citizenship and legal residents". Rubio described the offer as the "most unprecedented and extraordinary migratory agreement anywhere in the world". Bukele stated that these "dangerous American criminals" would be incarcerated in CECOT. In March 2025, the United States deported 238 alleged members of the Venezuelan gang Tren de Aragua to El Salvador. Bukele met Trump in the Oval Office in April 2025 where they discussed immigration. Both Trump and Bukele stated they could not unilaterally release Kilmar Abrego Garcia, a migrant deported due to an administrative error.

==== Relations with China ====
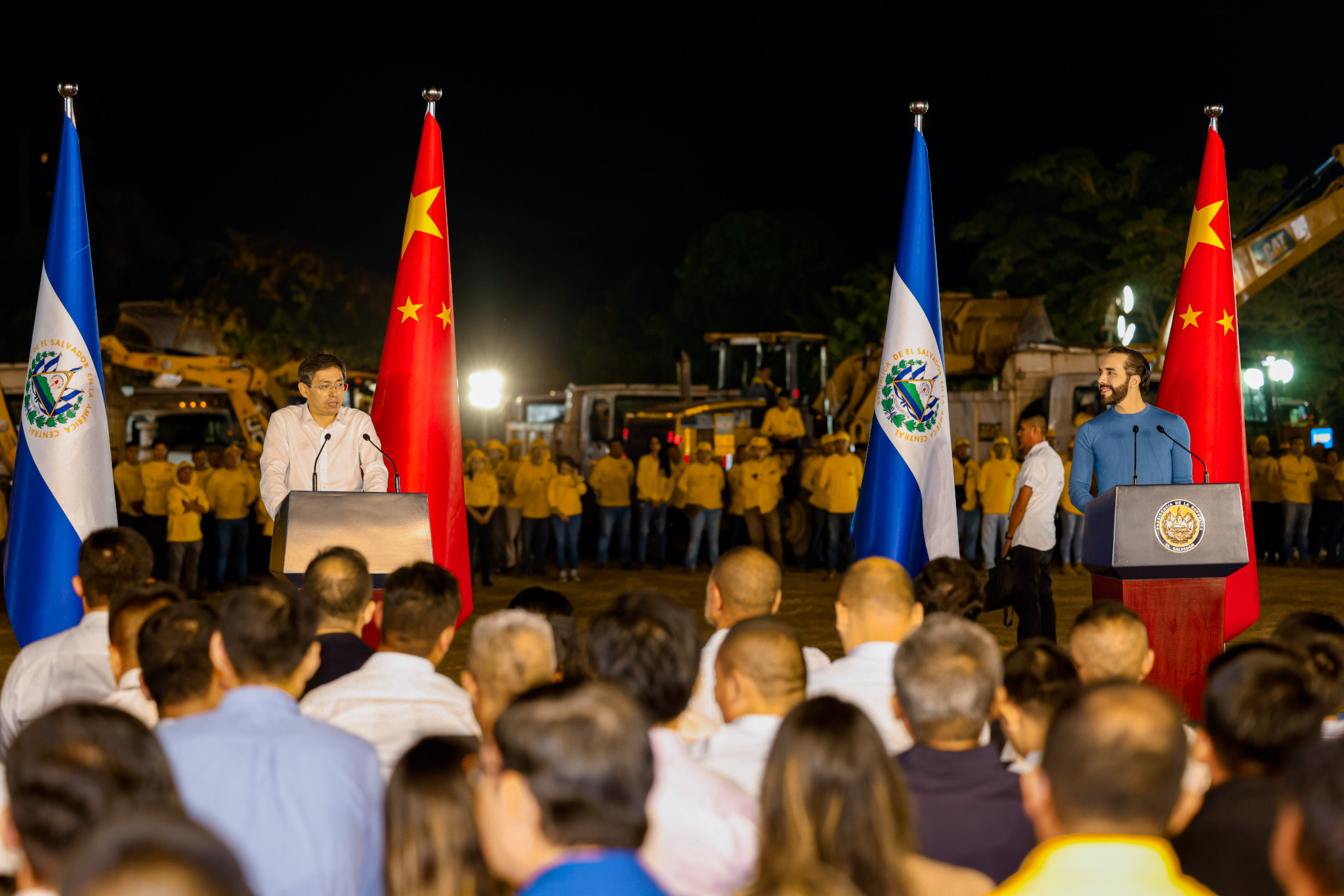
Bukele with Chinese ambassador Zhang Yanhui at the beginning of construction of the National Stadium of El Salvador in November 2023

In 2018, El Salvador cut diplomatic ties with Taiwan and recognized the People's Republic of China as China's legitimate government. This led to Bukele and the United States accusing China of interfering in Salvadoran and Latin American politics. Despite Bukele's criticism of China before becoming president, Vice President Félix Ulloa stated in May 2019 that Bukele's government would not restore diplomatic relations with Taiwan. In December 2019, Bukele met Chinese leader Xi Jinping in Beijing and signed a "gigantic" infrastructure agreement with China for an unknown amount of money. El Salvador and China have cooperated on infrastructure projects in El Salvador such as the National Library of El Salvador (completed in November 2023) and the National Stadium of El Salvador (construction began in November 2023).

In November 2022, Bukele announced that El Salvador and China had begun negotiations for a free trade agreement between the countries. China donated fertilizer and wheat flour to El Salvador and, according to a Salvadoran government official, offered to buy El Salvador's external bond debt. Bukele stated that a free trade agreement with China was "very important" because El Salvador had been "isolated from [the] potential" of China's economic strength.

=== Alleged governmental corruption ===
Twenty of Bukele's governmental institutions were investigated by the office of the attorney general in November 2020 for corruption related to the COVID-19 pandemic, but the investigations were halted after the attorney general was removed by the Legislative Assembly on 1 May 2021. The United States has placed sanctions on several of Bukele's government officials, labeling them as corrupt. The officials include Javier Argueta (presidential advisor), Osiris Luna Meza (general director of penal centers), Carlos Marroquín Chica (chairman of the Social Fabric Reconstruction Unit), Martha Carolina Recinos (chief of the cabinet), Rogelio Rivas (former minister of justice), Ernesto Sanabria (press secretary), and Alejandro Zelaya (former minister of finance). The U.S. also considered some of Bukele's Legislative Assembly allies corrupt, including Guillermo Gallegos and Christian Guevara. Some of the individuals are included on the U.S. State Department's "Engel List" of Central American politicians and judges considered "corrupt and undemocratic". Bukele called the sanctions and labels "absurd". In May 2021, the United States diverted El Salvador funding from government institutions to civil society groups to combat perceived corruption in Bukele's government.

On 11 November 2021, Bukele introduced the "Foreign Agents Law" to the Legislative Assembly with the goal of "prohibiting foreign interference" in Salvadoran political affairs. According to Minister of the Interior Juan Carlos Bidegain, the law was meant to "guarantee the security, national sovereignty and social and political stability of the country". Although Bukele stated that the law was modeled on the United States' Foreign Agents Registration Act (FARA), critics have compared it to Nicaraguan laws that institute press censorship by shutting down organizations and arresting journalists. Human Rights Watch reported on 16 December 2021 that 91 Twitter accounts belonging to journalists, lawyers, and activists were blocked by Bukele and governmental institutions. In October 2024, when investigative journalists published a report that found that Bukele, his three brothers, wife, and mother had purchased 34 properties valued at US$9 million during Bukele's first presidential term, Bukele referred to the journalists as "imbeciles" and denied accusations of corruption.

=== Anti-corruption campaigns ===
Bukele established the International Commission Against Impunity in El Salvador (CICIES) in September 2019, an anti-corruption commission to combat drug trafficking, corruption, and white-collar crimes. CICIES was operated by the Salvadoran government and the Organization of American States (OAS), and cooperated with the National Civil Police to form an anti-corruption unit. Bukele dissolved CICIES in June 2021 after the OAS named Ernesto Muyshondt an anti-corruption advisor; Ernesto Muyshondt was accused by the Salvadoran government of electoral fraud and illegal negotiation with gang members to vote for ARENA during the 2014 presidential election. He was arrested and was scheduled to go on trial in April 2024, despite concerns about his health.

On 1 June 2023, during a speech celebrating his fourth year in office, Bukele stated that his government would begin a "war against corruption" ("guerra contra la corrupción"). He announced that he would build a prison for individuals convicted of white-collar crimes that would be similar to the Terrorism Confinement Center. Bukele stated that the police and military would arrest white-collar criminals like they capture gang members in the gang crackdown. He added that Attorney General Rodolfo Delgado was in the process of raiding and confiscating assets worth up to $68 million from former Salvadoran president Alfredo Cristiani as part of the anti-corruption campaign. Others charged during Bukele's war on corruption include deputies Erick García, Lorena Peña and Alberto Romero, and national security advisor Alejandro Muyshondt.

In 2022, the last full year before the war against corruption was announced, Transparency International's Corruption Perceptions Index gave El Salvador a score of 33 out of 100 and ranked it 116th out of 180 countries. According to a February 2023 CID-Gallup opinion poll, only four percent of Salvadorans considered corruption the country's most pressing issue.

=== Municipal and legislative reductions ===
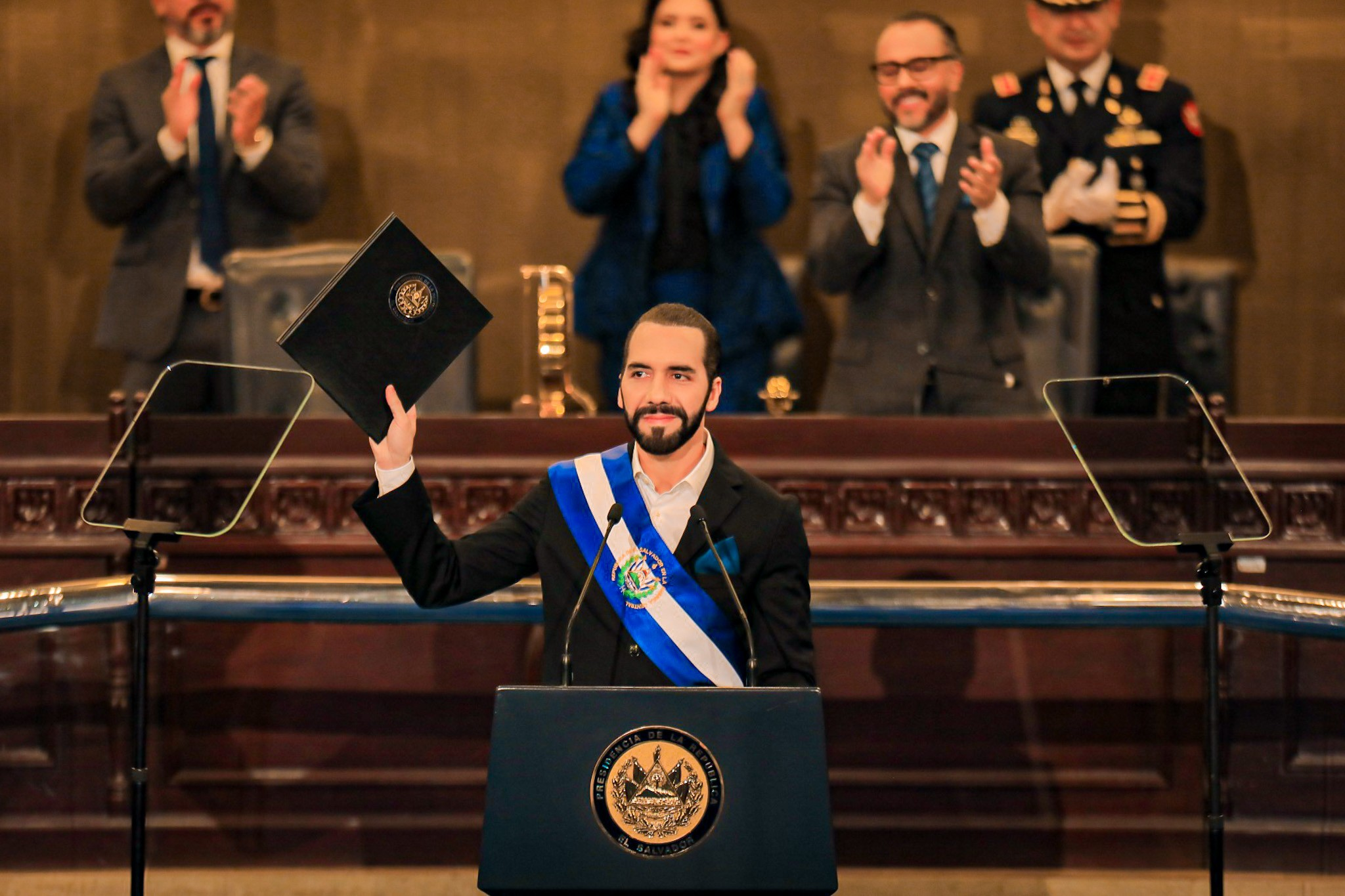
Bukele holding a bill proposing the reduction of the number of municipalities from 262 to 44

In December 2022, Bukele tweeted that he believed that the country's 262 municipalities should be reduced to 50. He called it "absurd" ("absurdo") that El Salvador, around 8,100 square miles (21,000 km^{2}) in size, had so many municipalities. Some lawyers and politicians criticized Bukele's proposed reduction as an attempt to consolidate power by gerrymandering. His allies supported the proposal, with some proposing a reduction in the number of Legislative Assembly seats.

On 1 June 2023, during a speech commemorating his fourth year in office, Bukele announced that he would present two proposals to the Legislative Assembly. One sought to reduce the number of seats in the assembly from 84 to 60, and the other sought to reduce the number of municipalities from 262 to 44. Bukele justified the legislative reduction by saying that the legislature had 60 seats before the signing of the Chapultepec Peace Accords in 1992 that ended the Salvadoran Civil War, and the accords' only accomplishment was the addition of 24 seats to the legislature. About the municipal-reduction proposal, he stated that the 262 municipalities would retain their cultural identities and be classified as districts. The Legislative Assembly approved the proposal for legislative reductions on 7 June 2023, and approved the proposal for municipal reductions six days later. Both reductions became effective on 1 May 2024.

=== Re-election campaigns ===
On 3 September 2021, the Supreme Court of Justice ruled that the president can serve two consecutive terms in office. The ruling overturned a 2014 ruling that presidents had to wait ten years to be eligible to run for re-election. Constitutional lawyers criticized the ruling, saying that consecutive re-election violates El Salvador's constitution. The 2021 ruling allowed Bukele to run for re-election in the 2024 presidential election. ARENA and the FMLN protested the court's ruling, with an ARENA spokesperson calling it a "precursor to a dictatorship" and an FMLN representative saying that the state is serving only one person: Bukele. The ruling was also condemned by the United States government. Jean Elizabeth Manes, chargé d'affaires of the United States to El Salvador, called it "clearly contrary to the Salvadoran constitution". According to Manes, the ruling was a direct result of the May 2021 legislative replacement of the Supreme Court justices.

External video
- Bukele's speech celebrating 201 years independence, where he announced he would run for re-election in 2024 (34:00)

On 15 September 2022, during a speech commemorating El Salvador's 201st anniversary of independence, Bukele announced that he would run for re-election in 2024. According to Bukele, "developed countries have re-election, and thanks to the new configuration of the democratic institution of our country, now El Salvador will too". Constitutional lawyers criticized his announcement, saying that presidential re-election violates "at least" four articles of the El Salvador constitution.

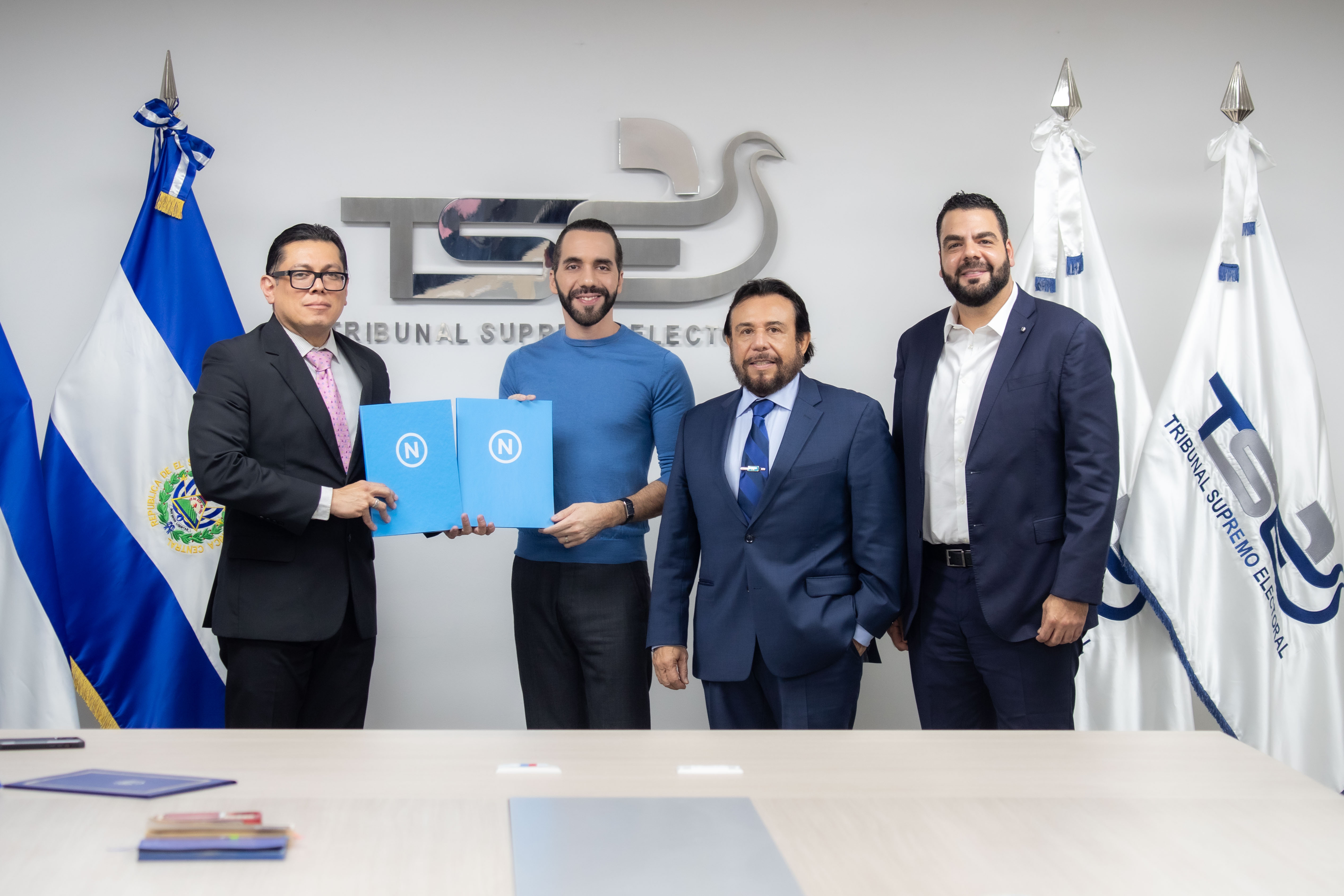
Bukele registering his 2024 presidential candidacy with the TSE

Bukele registered as a presidential pre-candidate on 26 June 2023 with Nuevas Ideas; Ulloa registered as Bukele's vice-presidential pre-candidate. Nuevas Ideas nominated Bukele and Ulloa as their presidential and vice-presidential candidates on 9 July. The party began registering Bukele and Ulloa's candidacies with the TSE on 26 October, the last day to do so. On 3 November 2023, the TSE registered their candidacies amidst opposition requests to reject Bukele's candidacy.

On 30 November 2023, the Legislative Assembly granted Bukele and Ulloa leaves of absence to focus on their re-election campaign. The leave went into effect the following day and Bukele's presidential powers were suspended. The Legislative Assembly named Claudia Rodríguez de Guevara, Bukele's presidential secretary, as the presidential designate; Rodríguez was the first woman in Salvadoran history to hold presidential power. Her appointment was criticized by some lawyers and opposition politicians as unconstitutional.

Including Bukele, there were six presidential candidates in the 2024 election. His primary opponents were ARENA's Joel Sánchez, a businessman, and the FMLN's Manuel Flores, a former legislator. Bukele led Sánchez and Flores by large margins in opinion polling before the election. Bukele promised to maintain the gang crackdown, invest in infrastructure projects, and promote economic growth during his second term. On 4 February 2024, he won re-election with 84.65 percent of the vote. Bukele was the first Salvadoran president to be re-elected since Maximiliano Hernández Martínez in 1944. Nuevas Ideas retained its Legislative Assembly supermajority and, with its allies, won 43 of the country's 44 municipalities. Several news outlets described the election results as a "landslide victory" for Bukele and Nuevas Ideas, and Bukele described his victory as "the record in the entire democratic history of the world". The TSE granted Bukele his presidential credentials on 29 February and his second term began on 1 June.

In a 2024 interview with Time, Bukele declined to run for a third term in the next presidential election. In July 2025, the Legislative Assembly passed several constitutional amendments, among them, the abolition of presidential term limits that made Bukele eligible to run for re-election indefinitely. Additionally, the legislature voted to move the date of the next presidential election from 2029 to 2027, reducing the length of Bukele's second term by two years. In December 2025, Bukele told YouTuber TheGrefg that "if it were up to me, I would stay for 10 more years". On 28 June 2026, Bukele registered as a pre-candidate with Nuevas Ideas, seeking a third presidential term; on 12 July, the party formally nominated him as its presidential candidate.

== Personal life ==
=== Family ===
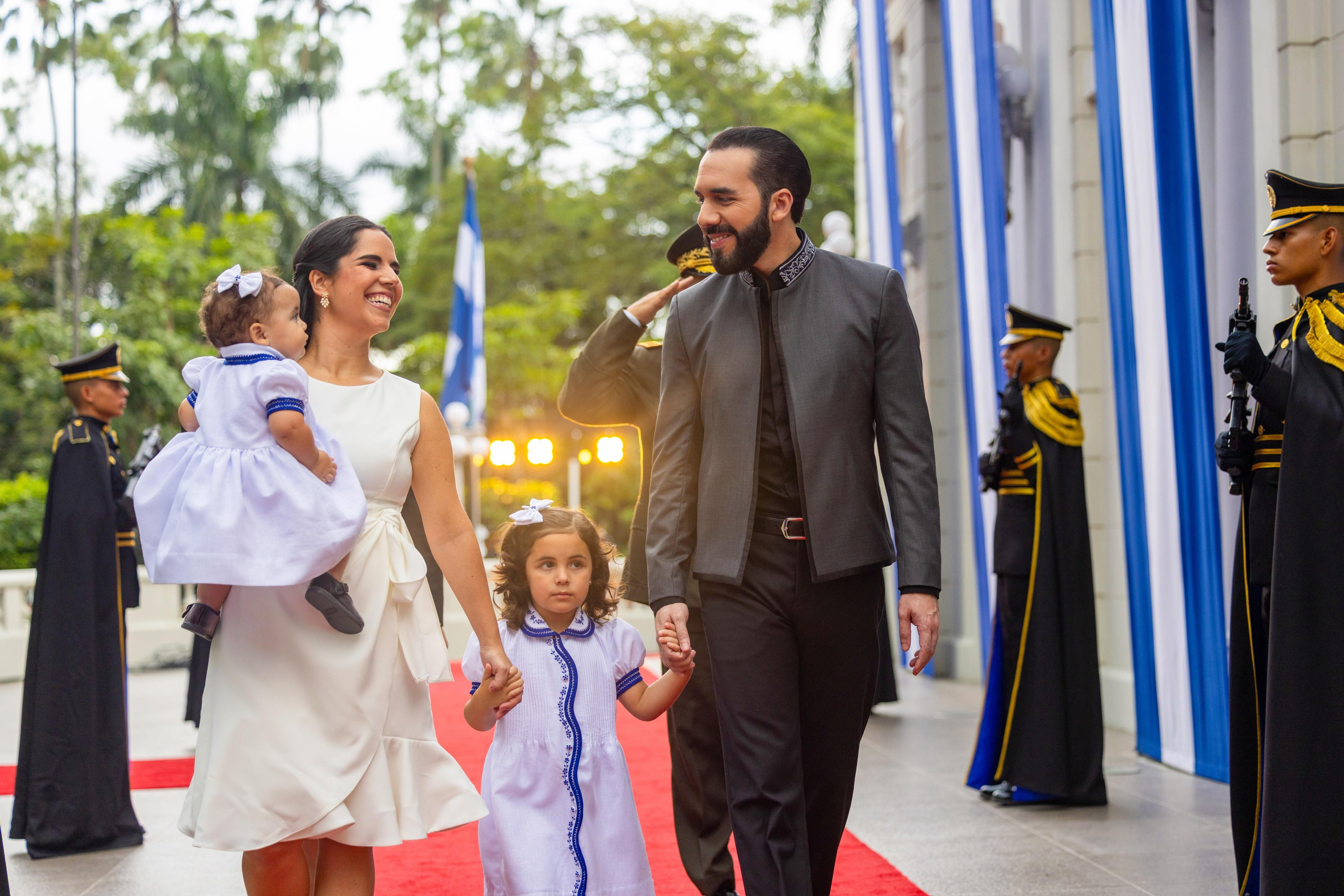
Bukele with his wife and their two daughters in 2024

Bukele began dating psychologist and former ballet dancer Gabriela Rodríguez in 2004 and the two married on 6 December 2014. The couple have two daughters. Their first was born in 2019 and their second in 2023.

=== Wealth ===
According to the Salvadoran government's transparency website, Bukele's monthly presidential salary was $5,181 in July 2019. According to the website, he had a net worth of $2,548,967 at that time. Bukele acquired most of his wealth through business ventures before entering politics. Bukele owns a coffee farm. In July 2024, he began donating coffee beans grown on his farm to local businesses and launched the Bean of Fire coffee brand. Through Bean of Fire, Bukele became one of El Salvador's largest coffee producers. In 2024, the Redacción magazine published the second of its two investigations against him, which found that his family land holding increased 12-fold during his first five years as president and that his family's wealth had increased considerably.

=== Religion ===
Bukele's religious beliefs were controversial during his 2019 presidential campaign, with rumors that he was a Christian, a Muslim, or an atheist. The controversy began when pictures from 2011 of Bukele praying at a mosque with his father and brothers spread on social media. Bukele dismissed the controversy as an attempt by the political right to exploit Islamophobia in the predominantly Catholic country.

Although Bukele does not identify with any religion, he has stated that he believes in God and Jesus. In a 2015 interview, Bukele said: "I am not a person who believes much in the liturgy of religions. However, I believe in God, in Jesus Christ. I believe in his word, I believe in his word revealed in the Holy Bible. And I know that God does not reject anyone because of their origins". Before that year, some Salvadorans believed that he was a Muslim. Bukele has referred to Bible verses, God, and Saint Óscar Romero — the archbishop of San Salvador who was assassinated in 1980 — in some of his speeches, and has called himself an "instrument of God" ("instrumento de Dios"). He met with Pope Francis in April 2015, saying that the pope told him that Rutilio Grande — a Jesuit priest who was assassinated in 1977 — would soon be beatified.

== Political views ==
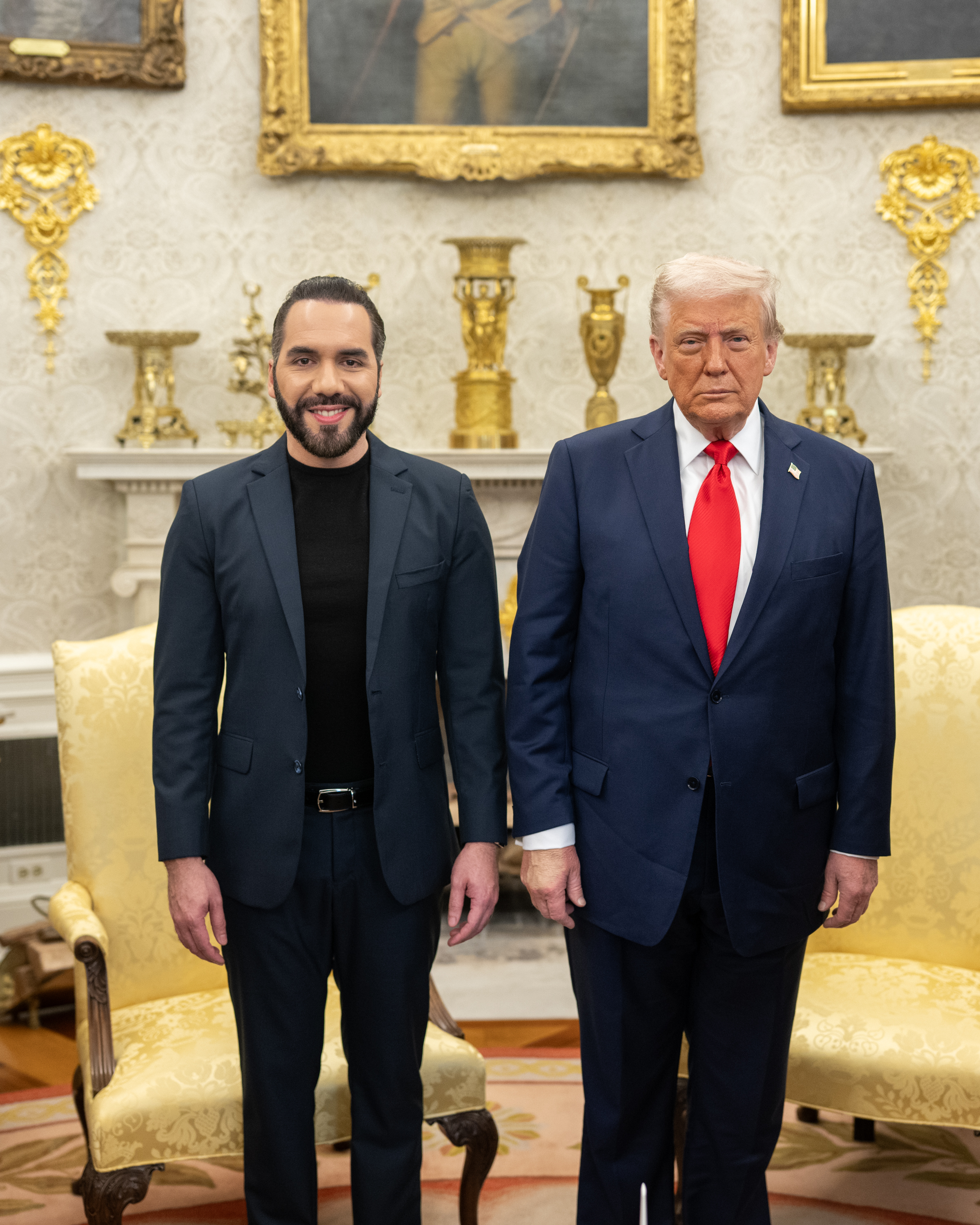
Bukele with U.S. president Donald Trump (to whom Bukele and his governing style have been compared) in April 2025

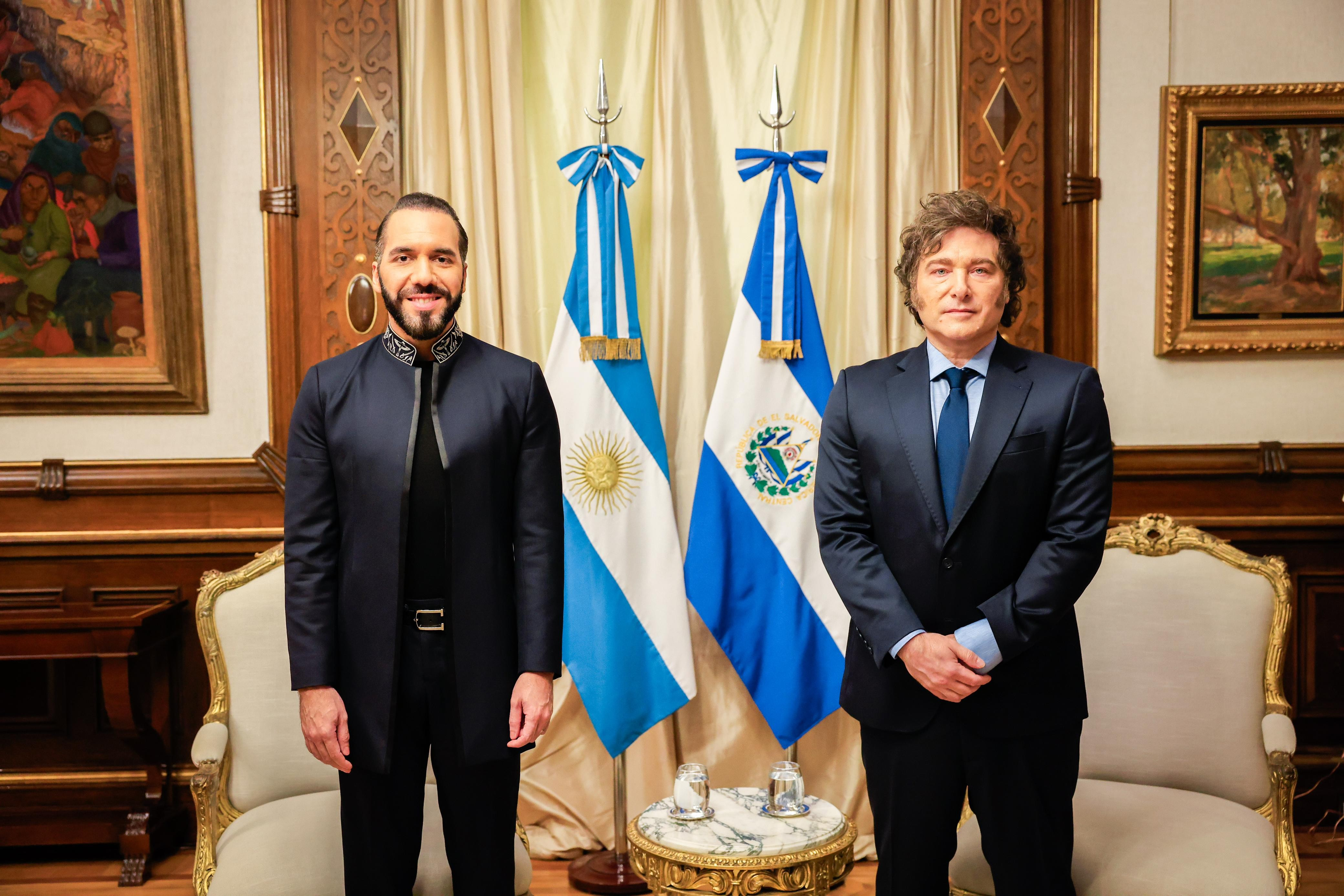
Bukele with Argentine president Javier Milei (to whom Bukele and his policies have been compared) in September 2024

As mayor of Nuevo Cuscatlán, Bukele described himself as part of the radical left because he wanted "radical changes" ("cambios radicales") for El Salvador; he also stated that his family had always had significant connections with the Salvadoran political left. Bukele believed in social justice and the state obligation to guarantee Salvadorans the opportunity for "health, education, [and] productive infrastructure" ("salud, educación, [e] infraestructura productiva"). Some FMLN members criticized Bukele's work as a businessman, believing that it contradicted the "historic goal of the proletariat" ("papel histórico del proletariado"): eliminating capitalism.

Since becoming president, Bukele has stated that he does not adhere to any specific political ideology. He has criticized the political left and right in El Salvador for dividing the country after the civil war. In an interview with Time's Vera Bergengruen, he stated that he did not consider himself either left- or right-wing. El Faro's editorial board has described Bukele as a "politician without an ideology" ("político sin ideología"). Despite Bukele's ostensible ideologic neutrality, some journalists and political analysts have described him as a populist, a right-wing populist, and a conservative. Bukele himself has received support from conservatives abroad in both Latin America (Note: Attributed to multiple sources.) and the United States, (Note: Attributed to multiple sources.) particularly for his anti-crime policies, as well as criticism for democratic backsliding and consolidating power. His political views and government policies have been referred to by some journalists as "Bukelism" or the "Bukele method". Bukelism is also seen by some as a Third Way ideology.

Some Western journalists have compared Bukele to U.S. President Donald Trump, citing Bukele's style of governance, government policies, rhetoric, and criticism of the press as similar to Trump's. In 2019, Foreign Policy's Melissa Vida referred to Bukele as "El Salvador's Trump" and Jacobin's Hilary Goodfriend called him "the Donald Trump of Central America". Bukele was one of the first world leaders to congratulate Trump after his victory in the 2024 United States presidential election. In 2024, The Economist described Bukele as politically "hard right" and compared his policies and ideological views to Argentinian president Javier Milei, former Brazilian president Jair Bolsonaro, and now-president of Chile José Antonio Kast.

Bukele is a critic of George Soros, saying in May 2023 that "in all the countries of Latin America, there are outlets and 'journalists' paid by Soros" ("en todos los países de Latinoamérica hay medios y 'periodistas' pagados por Soros"). In February 2024, Bukele spoke at the American Conservative Political Action Conference (CPAC) and accused Soros of attempting to "dictate public politics and laws" ("dictar políticas públicas y leyes") in El Salvador. Bukele also expressed opposition to globalism, saying that "it's already dead" in El Salvador.

=== Social issues ===
In 2023, Celia Medrano described Bukele's positions on social issues as "flexible" ("flexibles") and a "liquid ideology" ("ideología líquida"). She explained that Bukele changes his positions to appease as many voters as possible and to gauge public opinion on issues such as same-sex marriage and abortion.

Bukele stated in 2014 that he was an ally of the LGBT community, supported their civil rights, and opposed discrimination against LGBT individuals. In August 2021, Bukele proposed constitutional reform to legalize same-sex marriage in El Salvador. The proposal would have changed text in the constitution that defined marriage as being between "a man and a woman" ("hombre y mujer") to defining marriage as between "spouses" ("cónyuges"), and would have prohibited discrimination based on sexual orientation. The earliest Bukele's proposal could have gone into effect would have been 2027, since it would have to be approved by two consecutive sessions of the Legislative Assembly. Bukele stated the following month that the proposed constitutional reform would not legalize same-sex marriage, posting on Facebook that the original text would remain intact. In March 2024, Bukele stated that his government would remove "all traces" of "gender ideologies in schools and colleges". In June 2024, Bukele fired 300 bureaucrats from the ministry of culture for promoting policies that were "incompatible" with his emphasis on "patriotic and family values".

El Salvador has one of the world's strictest abortion laws, banning it in all circumstances with no exceptions. In 2013, when a Salvadoran woman known as "Beatriz" was denied an abortion despite doctors saying that she would die in childbirth, Bukele called those who denied her an abortion "fanatics" ("fanáticos"). Bukele stated in October 2018 that he only supported abortion in cases where the mother's life was at risk, and expressed opposition to abortion on demand. Shortly after becoming president, he opposed abortion under any circumstances. In an interview with Puerto Rican rapper Residente, Bukele said that "someday, we are going to recognize that [abortion] is a great genocide" ("algún día, nos vamos a dar cuenta de que es un gran genocidio"). Bukele's August 2021 constitutional-reform proposal considered legalizing abortion in cases where the mother's life was at risk, adding that the proposal would have recognized the right to life for mother and child. He changed his mind the following month, saying that abortion would not be decriminalized and recognizing the "RIGHT TO LIFE (from the moment of conception)" of the unborn. Bukele also ruled out euthanasia.

=== Central American unity ===
Avatar of Nayib Bukele

Nayib Bukele
(@nayibbukele)
tweeted:

Spanish:

Aunque por ahora suena a utopía, el sentido común debería apuntar a la unificación de Centroamérica en un solo país.

Translation:

Although for now it sounds like a utopia, common sense should point to the unification of Central America into a single country.

27 January 2017

Bukele is a proponent of Central American reunification, an ideology that calls for Costa Rica, El Salvador, Guatemala, Honduras, and Nicaragua to reestablish the Federal Republic of Central America, and has stated that Central America should be "one single nation" in some of his speeches. In January 2024, he reaffirmed on Twitter that he believes that Central America should unite as a single country; each individual country is small and lacks natural resources, but a unified Central American population and biodiversity would help strengthen the region. In his tweet, Bukele conceded that he needed "the will of the peoples" ("la voluntad de los pueblos") of Central America to unite the region.

Bukele was the president pro tempore of the Central American Integration System (SICA), an economic and political organization, from 5 June to 22 December 2019. In February 2020, Bukele signed an agreement with the Guatemalan government to remove restrictions on border crossings between El Salvador and Guatemala and designate flights between the countries as "domestic" flights to promote tourism. The agreement gave Bukele's government the ability to build a port on the Caribbean Sea in Guatemalan territory, that would give El Salvador access to the Atlantic Ocean. He described the agreement as "the greatest step to the integration of Central America in the last 180 years" ("el mayor paso en la integración de Centroamérica en los últimos 180 años").

According to Will Freeman of the Council on Foreign Relations, Bukele has styled himself as the "second coming of Francisco Morazán", a Honduran politician who was president of the Federal Republic of Central America in the 1820s and 1830s. El Faro's Gabriel Labrador compared him to 18th-century military officer and Venezuela independence leader Simón Bolívar for wanting to form a "union of the [Central American] people".

=== Emigration ===
In an interview with VICE News' Krishna Andavolu shortly after Bukele's inauguration, he said that he "share[s] the same concern President Trump [has with] immigration, but for different reasons [...] [Trump] doesn't want our people to go; I don't want our people to leave." In a 2021 interview on Fox News' Tucker Carlson Tonight, Bukele attributed mass emigration from Central America to the United States to the region's "lack of economic opportunity" and "lack of security" and described the level of emigration to the United States as "immoral". He argued that emigration strained the United States and impeded domestic efforts to improve living conditions in El Salvador.

== Public image ==
=== Relationship with the press ===
There is a before and an after Nayib Bukele for El Salvador. (Hay un antes y un después de Nayib Bukele para El Salvador.)

— Forbes Central America, 20 June 2024

Bukele and a number of his government officials have attacked journalists and news outlets in speeches and on social media. He has dismissed critics of his government as spreading "fake news" and accused them of being "mercenaries". Bukele has also stated that journalism was once a "noble career that sought the truth" ("carrera noble que buscaba la verdad") that had supposedly become propaganda. Journalists have been harassed and threatened online by Bukele's supporters. The El Salvador Journalists Association (APES) estimated that by November 2022, at least a dozen journalists had fled El Salvador since Bukele took office citing fears for their safety. APES has also stated that journalists have experienced threats, harassment, doxxing, intimidation, surveillance, and criminal prosecution during Bukele's presidency.

According to political scientists, El Salvador has experienced democratic backsliding under Bukele as he has dismantled democratic institutions, curtailed political and civil liberties, and attacked independent media and the political opposition. Journalists, politicians, and political analysts have described Bukele as an autocrat, an authoritarian, a strongman, a caudillo, and a "millennial dictator". He has ironically referred to himself in his Twitter profile as the "Dictator of El Salvador", "the coolest dictator in the world" (although news outlets often render this as the "world's coolest dictator"), the "Emperor of El Salvador", the "CEO of El Salvador", and the "Philosopher King". Eduardo Escobar, a lawyer with Citizen Action, a non-governmental organization, stated that Bukele's use of his Twitter profile was part of his strategy to "ridicule the feelings of the public or the opposition".

In November 2021, Bukele introduced a bill known as the "Foreign Agents Law" ("Ley de Agentes Extranjeros") to the Legislative Assembly with the goal of "prohibiting foreign interference" ("prohibir la injerencia extranjera") in Salvadoran political affairs. Although he stated that the law was modeled on the United States' Foreign Agents Registration Act, critics instead compared the Foreign Agents Law to Nicaraguan laws that exercise press censorship by shutting down organizations and arresting journalists. In April 2022, the Legislative Assembly passed a law that allowed courts to sentence journalists to 10 to 15 years' imprisonment for reproducing or transmitting messages from gangs at the beginning of the country's gang crackdown. The APES described the law as "a clear attempt at censorship of media". According to a September 2024 Infobae report, leaked audio recordings made by Alejandro Muyshondt in August 2020 supposedly recorded him and Ernesto Castro, then Bukele's personal secretary, agreeing to spy on the newspapers El Diario de Hoy, El Faro, La Prensa Gráfica, and Revista Factum.

A few weeks after El Faro alleged that Bukele's government had negotiated with gangs in 2020 to reduce the country's homicide rate, Bukele launched an investigation of El Faro for money laundering. Although the office of the attorney general did not begin such an investigation, El Faro was subject to tax audits that Human Rights Watch's José Miguel Vivanco described as "selective and abusive". The audits were suspended in March 2021 after a Supreme Court order citing concerns about a risk to freedom of expression. In 2022, Amnesty International stated that at least 22 Salvadoran journalists (most of whom worked for El Faro) had their phones tapped by the Salvadoran government using the Israeli Pegasus spyware. El Faro moved its headquarters to San José, Costa Rica in April 2023, saying that it was trying to avoid "fabricated accusations" from Bukele's government. In 2025, Bukele claimed that most independent journalists and media outlets were part of a supposed "global money laundering operation" ("operación mundial de lavado de dinero"), referring to the United States Agency for International Development (USAID).

=== Hosting of international events ===
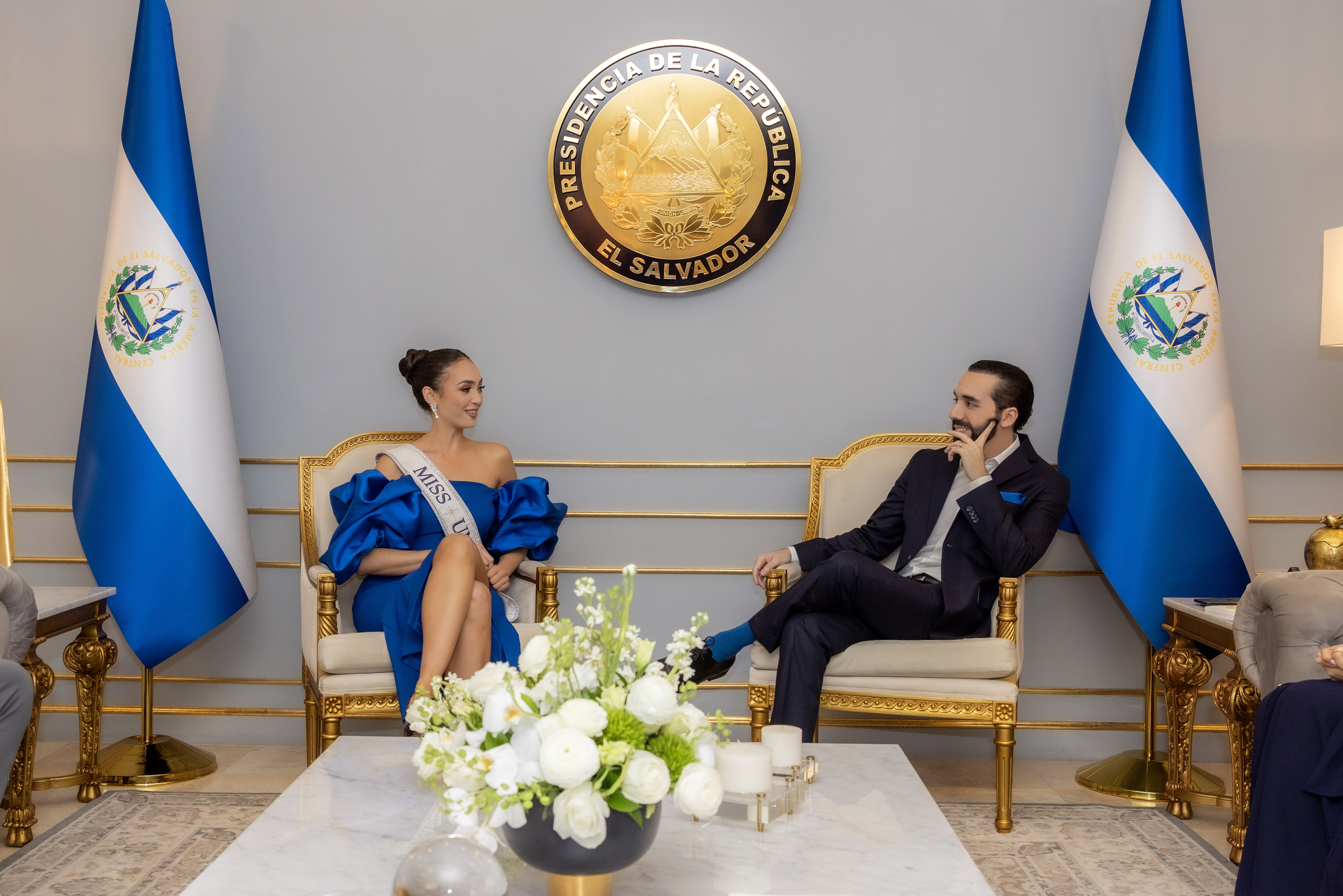
Bukele with Miss Universe 2022 R'Bonney Gabriel in October 2023

During Bukele's presidency, El Salvador has hosted a number of international sporting events and one edition of the Miss Universe beauty pageant. Some experts have described El Salvador's hosting of such events as an attempt at sportswashing.

Bukele has promoted surfing as part of El Salvador's tourism market. He designated part of El Salvador's Pacific coastline in the La Libertad Department as "Surf City", where the 2021 and 2023 ISA World Surfing Games were hosted. El Salvador also hosted the 2023 Central American and Caribbean Games. At the tournament's opening ceremony, Bukele rebuked critics by saying that he was "not a dictator" and told them to ask everyday Salvadorans what they thought about his "supposed dictatorship".

In January 2023, Bukele announced that El Salvador would host the Miss Universe 2023 pageant; the last time El Salvador had hosted Miss Universe was in 1975. At the pageant, Bukele said that Miss Universe had given El Salvador the opportunity to "show the world what we are capable of". On the day of the pageant, 300 members of the Movement for Victims of the State of Emergency held a protest demanding the release of innocent victims of the country's gang crackdown and wanting "Miss Universe to see that Salvadorans are suffering". Some protestors wore sashes reading "Miss Political Prisoners", "Miss Persecution", and "Miss Mass Trials".

=== Job approval and popularity ===
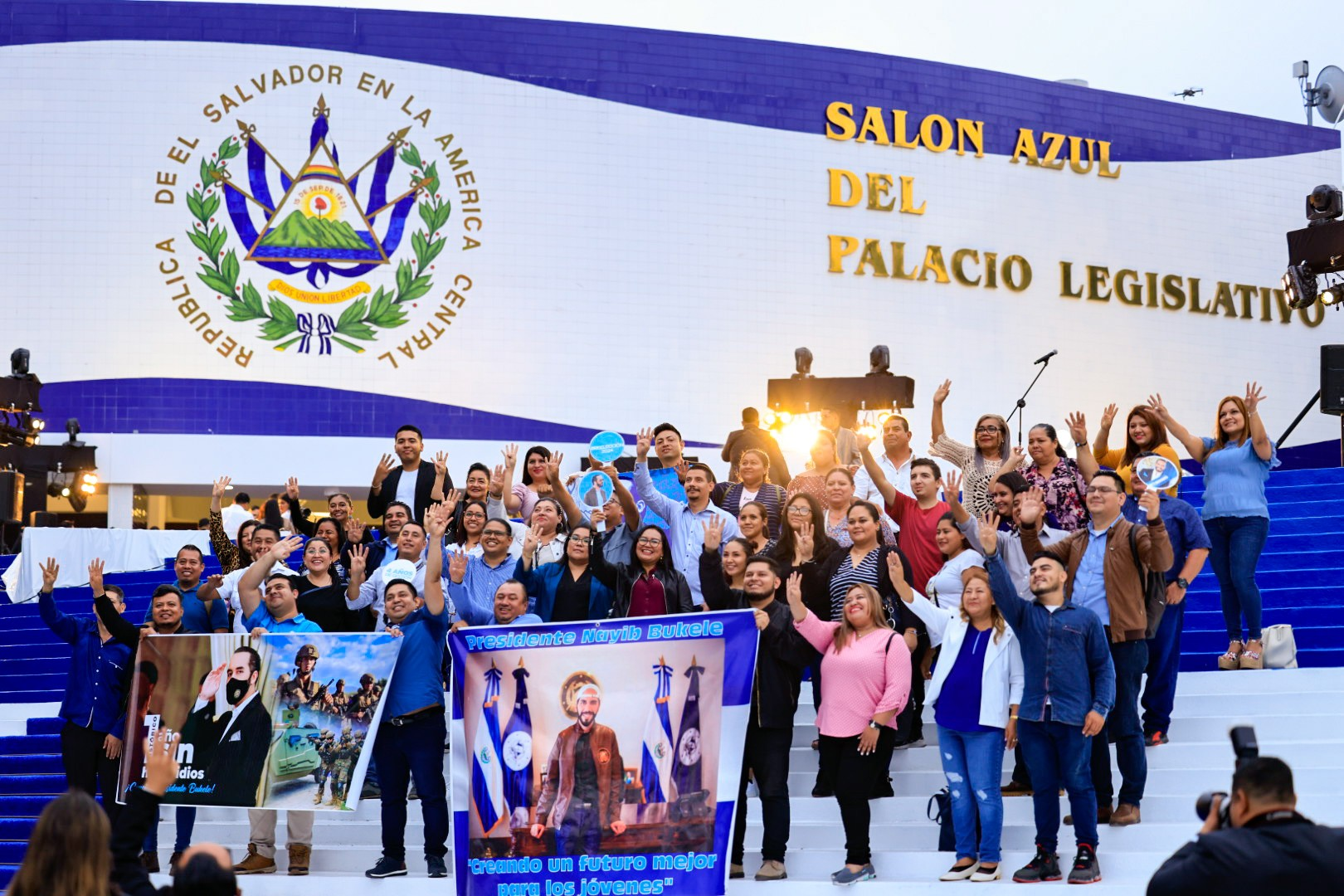
A crowd of Bukele supporters in front of the Legislative Assembly's meeting room in 2023

Although protests against Bukele occurred in 2020 during the COVID-19 pandemic and in 2023 about his re-election campaign and gang crackdown, he has retained high job-approval ratings throughout his presidency. Bukele's approval rating has never gone below 75 percent, and has averaged in the 90s. He is one of the most popular presidents in Salvadoran history, and the Los Angeles Times' Kate Linthicum called him "one of the most popular leaders in the world". The United States Institute of Peace's Mary Speck referred to Bukele as "Latin America's—and possibly the world's—most popular leader". Risa Grais-Targow, a director at the Eurasia Group, described Bukele's approval rating as "sky-high" and "really unprecedented".

In addition to Bukele's domestic popularity, he is also very popular among Salvadorans living in the United States and throughout Latin America. Some Latin American state leaders and other politicians have sought to emulate his government policies. In some countries, such as Colombia and Ecuador, opinion polls found Bukele more popular with their residents than domestic politicians. Steven Levitsky, a political scientist and the director of Harvard University's Latin American studies center, wrote that "everybody wants to be a Bukele" and compared his popularity across Latin America to that of former Venezuelan president Hugo Chávez. Some political analysts consider Bukele's popularity a cult of personality.

== Honors and decorations ==
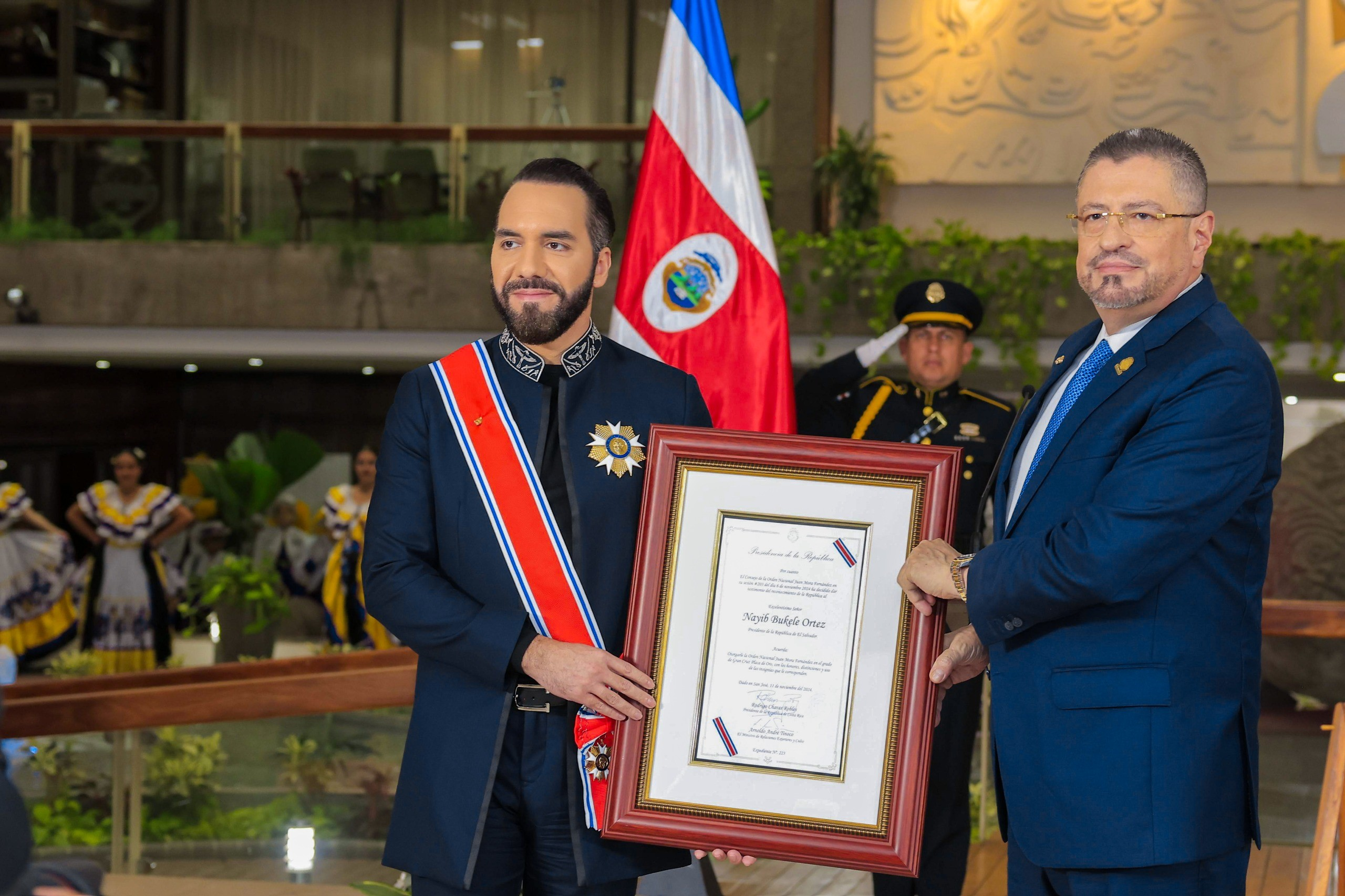
Bukele receiving the National Order of Juan Mora Fernández from Costa Rican president Rodrigo Chaves Robles

Beijing International Studies University awarded Bukele an honorary doctoral degree in December 2019. In 2021, Time named Bukele as one of the world's 100 most influential people.

=== Foreign decorations ===
Costa Rica

- Grand Cross with Golden Plaque of the National Order of Juan Mora Fernández (11 November 2024)

== Electoral history ==
| Year | Office | Party | Main opponent and party | | Votes for Bukele | | | | Result | Swing | Ref. |
| Year | Office | Party | Main opponent and party | | Total | % | P. | ±% | Result | Swing | Ref. |
|---|---|---|---|---|---|---|---|---|---|---|---|
| 2012 | Mayor of Nuevo Cuscatlán | FMLN | Tomás Rodríguez | ARENA | 2,862 | 51.67 | 1st | N/A | Won | Gain | |
| 2015 | Mayor of San Salvador | FMLN | Edwin Zamora | ARENA | 89,164 | 50.38 | 1st | N/A | Won | Gain | |
| 2019 | President of El Salvador | GANA | Carlos Calleja | ARENA | 1,434,856 | 53.10 | 1st | N/A | Won | Gain | |
| 2024 | President of El Salvador | NI | Manuel Flores | FMLN | 2,701,725 | 84.65 | 1st | +31.55 | Won | Hold | |
| 2027 | President of El Salvador | NI | TBD | | TBD | | | | TBD | | |

== See also ==
- List of current heads of state and government
- List of heads of the executive by approval rating

== Notes ==
Political offices
| Preceded by Álvaro Rodríguez | Mayor of Nuevo Cuscatlán; 2012–2015 | Succeeded by Michelle Sol |
| Preceded by Norman Quijano | Mayor of San Salvador; 2015–2018 | Succeeded by Ernesto Muyshondt |
| Preceded by Salvador Sánchez Cerén | President of El Salvador; 2019–present | Incumbent |
Party political offices
| New office | Leader of Nuevas Ideas; 2017–present | Incumbent |
| New political party | GANA nominee for President of El Salvador; 2019 | Most recent |
| New political party | NI nominee for President of El Salvador; 2024 | Most recent |
Honorary titles
| Preceded by Jimmy Morales | President pro tempore of the Central American Integration System; 2019 | Succeeded by Juan Orlando Hernández |
