= Colombia–El Salvador relations =

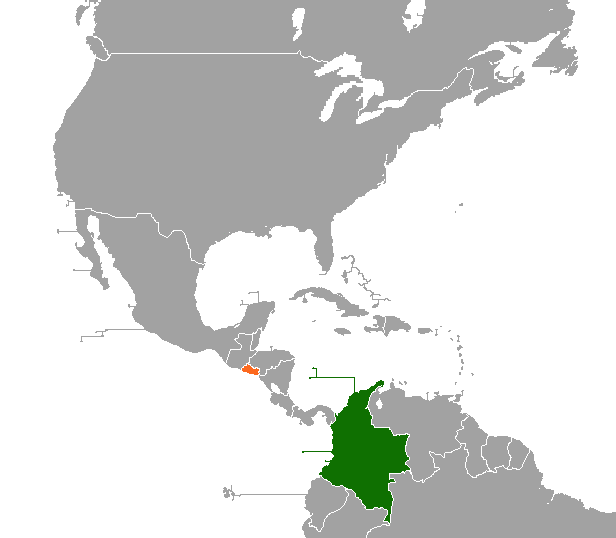

- Colombia: El Salvador

Diplomatic mission
- Embassy of Colombia in El Salvador: Embassy of El Salvador in Colombia

The Republic of Colombia and the Republic of El Salvador have maintained a friendly relationship since the 19th century. Between the two countries there are organizations such as the Colombia-El Salvador Joint Drug Commission, the Joint Commission for Technical, Scientific, Educational, Cultural and Sports Cooperation and the Bilateral Consultation and Coordination Mechanism. Colombia has an embassy in San Salvador, while El Salvador has an embassy in Bogotá. Both nations are members of the Association of Caribbean States, Community of Latin American and Caribbean States, Organization of American States, Organization of Ibero-American States and the United Nations.

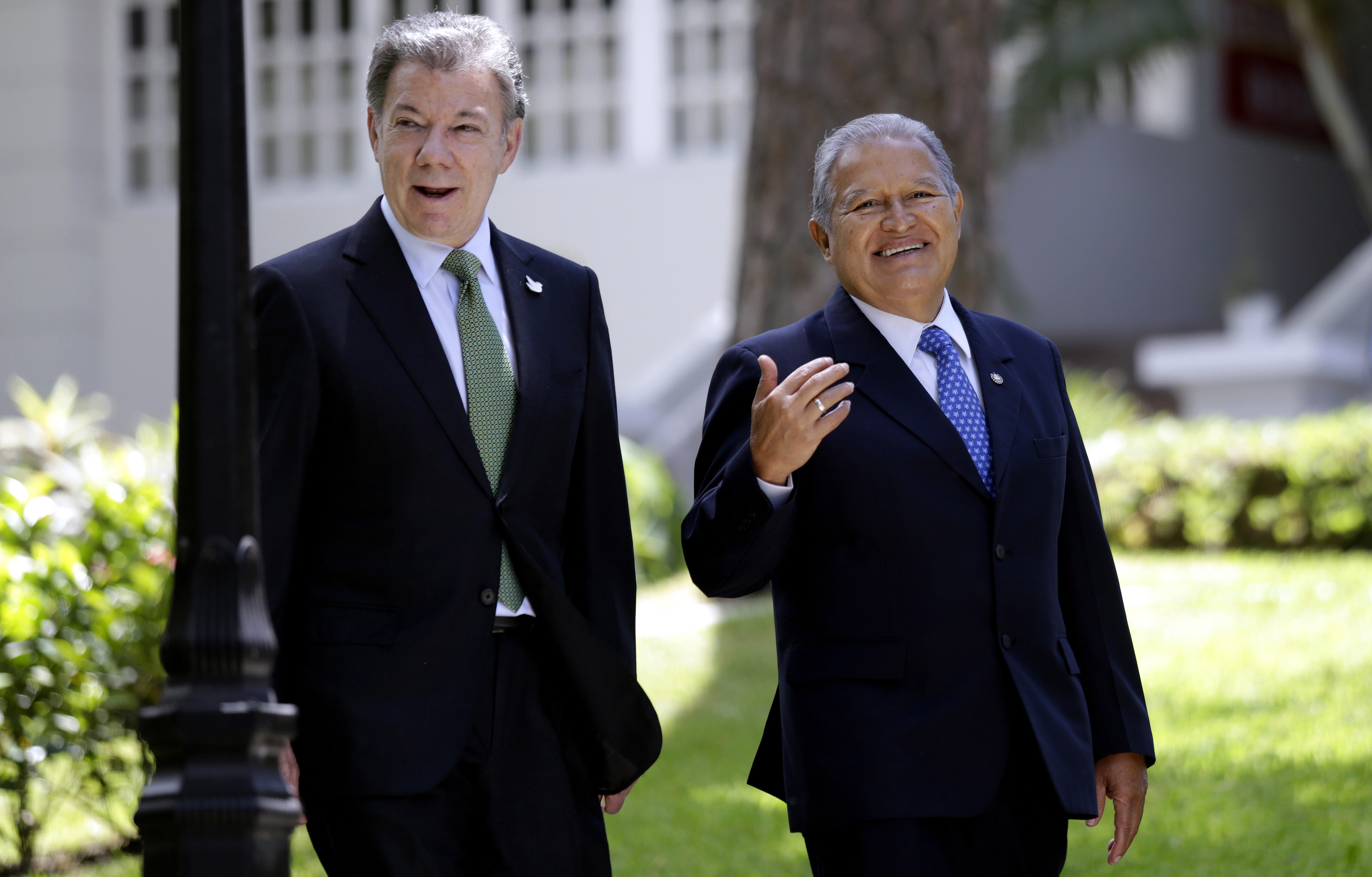
Former Presidents of El Salvador, Salvador Sánchez Cerén, and of Colombia, Juan Manuel Santos

== History ==
Both governments established diplomatic relations in 1825, shortly after their independence.

== Economic relations ==
Colombia exported products worth 43.6 billion dollars, the main products being chemicals, machinery and cosmetics, while Colombia exported products worth 5.4 billion dollars, the main products being agro-industrial, cosmetics and machinery. Both countries have a free trade agreement signed on August 9, 2007.

== Tensions ==
During the current presidency of Gustavo Petro, in a speech Petro has criticized the Terrorism Confinement Center (CECOT) considering it as a "concentration camp", both leaders began to have a discussion on Twitter about security in their countries, sparking a contentious debate between Bukele's admirers and Petro's.

On March 10, Petro criticized Bukele again, this time for a CNN report about an alleged truce established between the president's officials and the gangs, both leaders began to argue again on Twitter, so Bukele tweeted "Isn't it your son who makes deals under the table and also for money?" referring to the controversies of Nicolás Petro accused of possible crimes related to money laundering and profits.

On April 18, 2023, a Colombian fan of President Bukele was arrested for alleged ties to gangs, this is due to the tattoos he had, these actions were then criticized by some Colombian deputies, later criticizing the war against gangs that is currently taking place in El Salvador for said arbitrary arrests, however, after a few hours he was released, stating that the arrest was for immigration reasons.

== Diplomatic representation ==
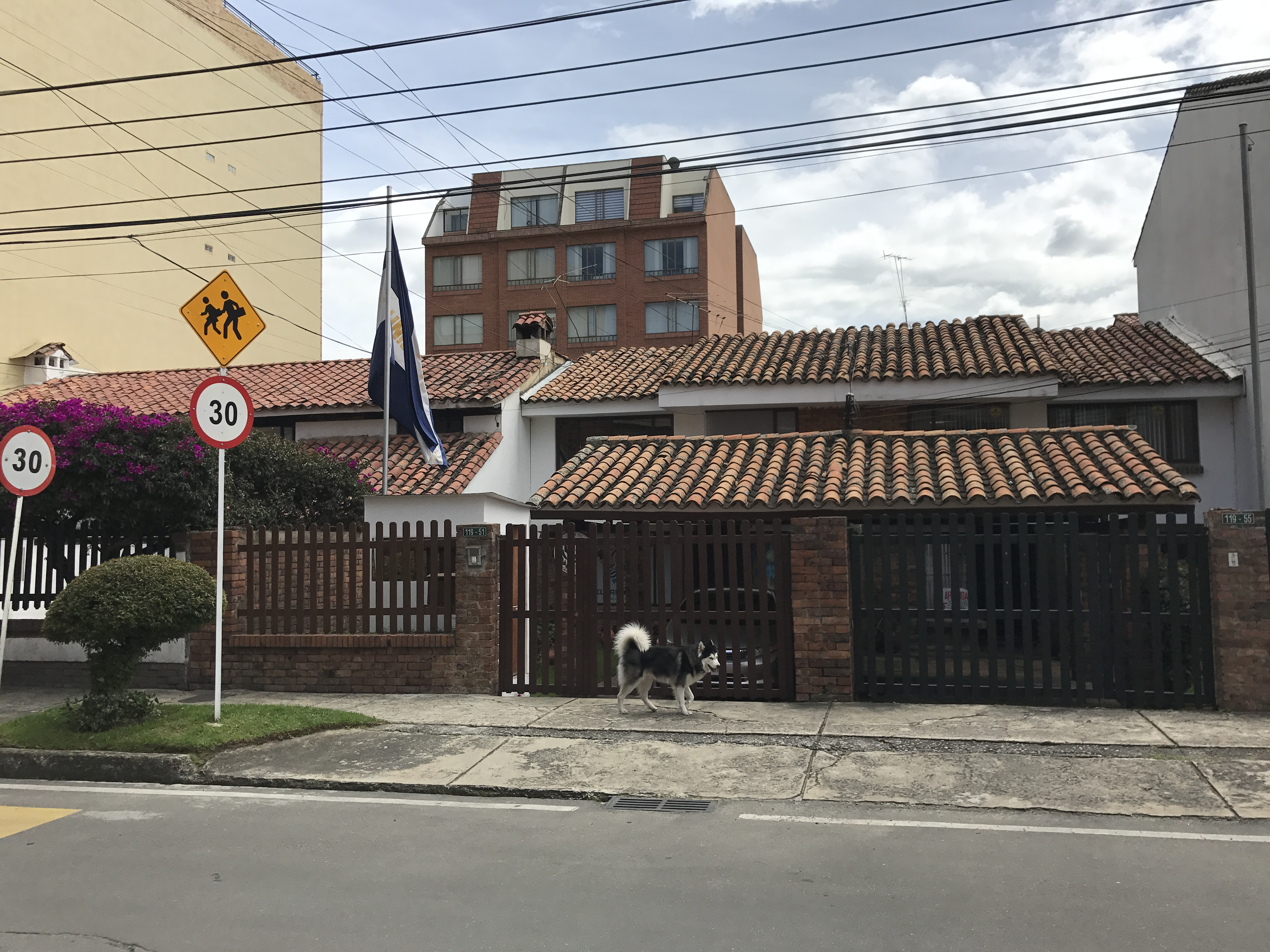
Embassy of El Salvador in Bogota

- Colombia has an embassy in San Salvador.
- El Salvador has an embassy in Bogotá.

== See also ==
- Foreign relations of El Salvador
- Foreign relations of Colombia
