= El Encuentro (prison) =

Prison in Ecuador

- Interactive map of El Encuentro
- Location: Santa Elena, Ecuador
- Status: Operational
- Security class: Maximum security prison
- Capacity: 800
- Population: 300 (11 November 2025)
- Opened: 11 November 2025; 9 months ago

Notable prisoners
- Jorge Glas

El Encuentro (Spanish for "The Encounter"), officially the Santa Elena No. 1 Detention Center is a maximum security prison in Santa Elena, Ecuador. The prison opened on 11 November 2025 when it accepted a transfer of 300 prisoners from the La Roca prison.

== History ==
In January 2024, Ecuadorian president Daniel Noboa announced the construction of two prisons to incarcerate 12,000 inmates. Noboa's announcement came during a conflict against criminal gangs in the country. He stated that both prisons would be modeled on the Terrorism Confinement Center (CECOT) built in El Salvador in 2023 to address a similar gang crackdown.

Construction on the prison in Santa Elena, known as "El Encuentro", began on 21 June 2024. On 11 November 2025, 300 prisoners were transferred from the La Roca prison to El Encuentro. Among the transferred prisoners was Jorge Glas, a former Vice President of Ecuador who is serving 21 years imprisonment for embezzlement and bribery.

== Facility ==
El Encuentro covers a land area of 37 hectares (91 acres). El Encuentro has six guard towers and 9-meter-tall (30 ft) walls. The prison has a capacity of 800 inmates. Those incarcerated at El Encuentro are considered to be highly dangerous and escape risks.
