= Osiris Luna Meza =

Salvadoran politician

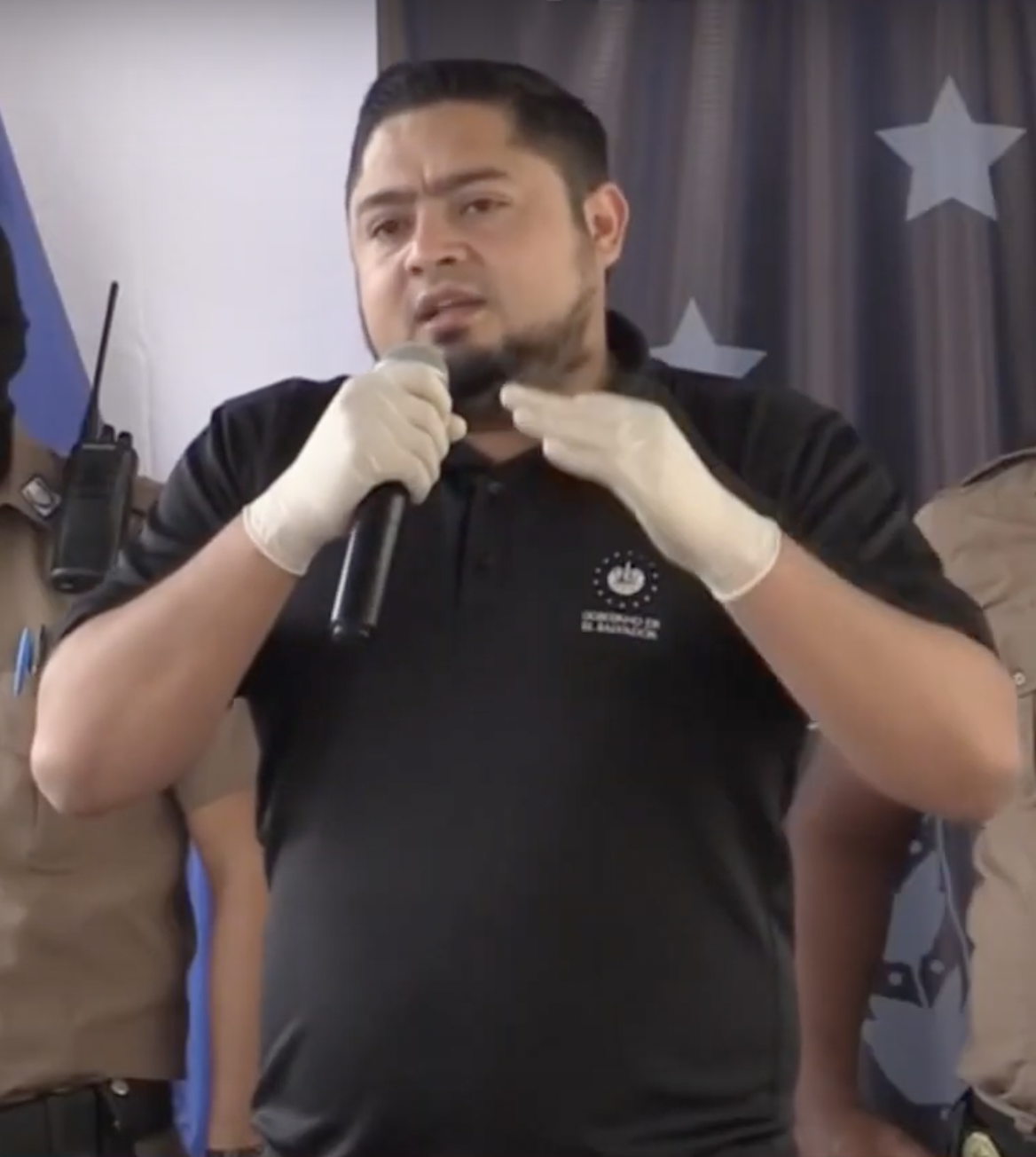

General Director of Penal Centers of El Salvador
- Incumbent
- Assumed office 18 June 2019
- President: Nayib Bukele
- Preceded by: Orlando Molina Ríos (interim)

Vice Minister of Justice and Public Security of El Salvador
- Incumbent
- Assumed office 18 June 2019
- President: Nayib Bukele
- Preceded by: Position established

Deputy of the Legislative Assembly of El Salvador from San Salvador
- In office 1 May 2018 – 18 June 2019

Personal details
- Born: 8 February 1989 (age 37) El Salvador
- Party: Grand Alliance for National Unity
- Occupation: Politician

Osiris Luna Meza (born 8 February 1989) is a Salvadoran politician who currently serves as the general director of penal centers and the vice minister of justice and public security. He previously served as a deputy of the Legislative Assembly from the department of San Salvador from 2018 to 2019.

== Early life ==
Osiris Luna Meza was born on 8 February 1989 in El Salvador. His mother is Alma Yanira Meza Olivares. Luna is a member of the Grand Alliance for National Unity (GANA) and is a close friend of Guillermo Gallegos, one of the party's most prominent members.

== Early political career ==
In 2018, Luna was elected as a deputy of the Legislative Assembly from the department of San Salvador as a member of GANA. Sonia Maritza López Alvarado was elected as Luna's substitute deputy. Luna was a member of three legislative commissions: the Commission for the Family, Children, Adolescents, Older Adults, and People with Disabilities; the Commission for External Relations, Central American Integration, and Salvadorans in the Exterior; and the Commission for Municipal Affairs.

As a member of the Legislative Assembly, Luna presented legislation to modernize and promote self-sustainability in the country's prisons. He was a member of five legislative commissions. He also served as the head of the Penitentiary Overcrowding Reduction Plan as a part of the General Directorate of Penal Centers (DGCP). Prior to the inauguration of President Nayib Bukele during the procession of the deputies of the XII Legislative Assembly, Luna was reportedly one of the few deputies which the crowd in attendance applauded.

== General Director of Penal Centers ==
On 4 June 2019, Rogelio Rivas, the Minister of Justice and Public Security, named Luna his selection to become the General Director of Penal Centers to replace Orlando Elías Molina Ríos who was serving in an interim capacity, however, the Legislative Assembly blocked his appointment. To circumvent the Legislative Assembly, Bukele appointed Luna as the Vice Minister of Justice and Public Security on 18 June 2019, and that Luna would assume office as General Director of Penal Centers as a result. Luna resigned as a deputy of the Legislative Assembly upon his appointment. Luna promised to "carry out an audit into the financial and work aspects" ("hacer una auditoría en el aspecto financiero y de trabajo") within the DGCP and to "seek to clarify" ("buscará esclarecer") the internal organization of the country's prisons.

Between 24 and 27 April 2020, a total of 77 people were murdered in El Salvador, and Bukele alleged that the murders were organized by gang members within the country's prisons. He ordered Luna to lockdown the country's prisons, lock inmates in their cells for 24 hours, and place the gangs' leaders in solitary confinement indefinitely. Luna later tweeted that "not even a single ray of sunlight will enter any of these cells".

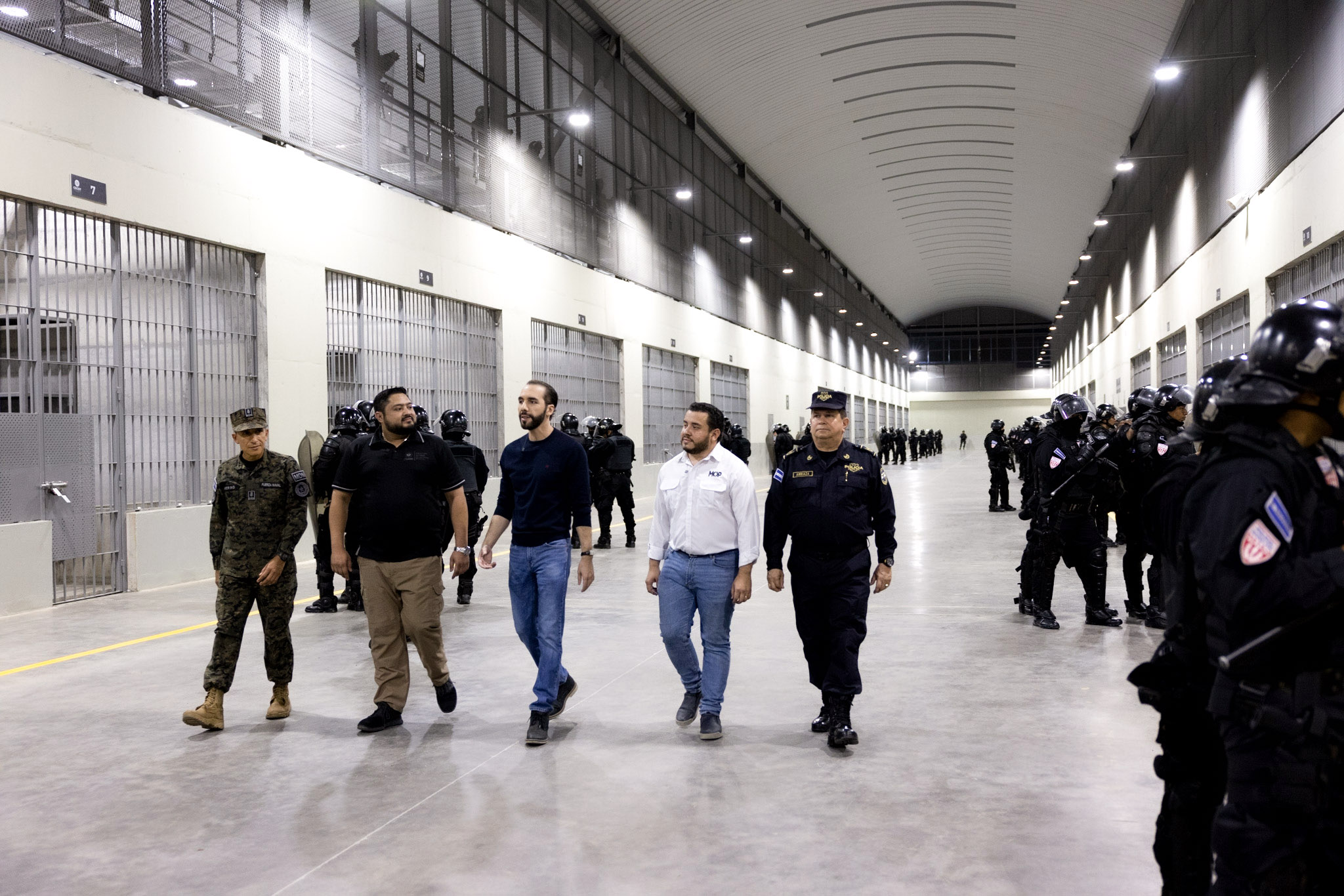
Luna guiding Bukele and other government officials on a tour of CECOT.

External videos
- Osiris Luna guiding President Nayib Bukele on a tour of CECOT.

Between 25 and 27 March 2022, a total of 87 people were murdered in El Salvador. The series of murders led to Bukele calling for a large-scale gang crackdown and state of exception which was approved by the Legislative Assembly on 27 March 2022. Since the beginning of the crackdown, thousands of alleged gang members have been arrested, and Luna assured that everyone arrested during the crackdown would be thoroughly investigated and that the arrests made were not arbitrary. He also stated that individuals who died while incarcerated died due to poor health, adding that "no deaths have been confirmed within prisons that are not linked to health issues" ("no se ha confirmado ninguna muerte dentro de los centros penales que no esté vinculada al tema de salud"). On 1 February 2023, Bukele posted a video on Twitter of him being led by Luna on a tour of the Terrorism Confinement Center (CECOT), a newly built prison in Tecoluca with a capacity for 40,000 prisoners. The prison was built to hold individuals arrested during the gang crackdown. Luna stated that prisoners would be made to work to "compensate for some of the damage they did to society" and that "all the terrorists who [caused] grief and pain to the Salvadoran people will serve their sentences [...] under the most severe regime".

On 3 November 2022, Luna announced that the government had begun to destroy the gravestones of deceased gang members, tweeting that "in El Salvador there is NO space for terrorists" and that "terrorists [gang members] will no longer be able to 'glorify' the memory of dead criminals". He also published images of gravestones being destroyed. Although the gravestones themselves would be destroyed, the government stated that the gang members' bodies would not be disturbed.

== Controversies ==
=== Allegations of misusing public funds ===
In November 2019, controversy arose over Luna not disclosing how he paid for a private flight to Los Angeles, arguing that he only has to report flights paid for with public funds. After an image of him on a private jet traveling to Mexico to meet with security contractors was leaked, Luna stated that he traveled to and from Mexico on Avianca El Salvador and he traveled within Mexico on private jets with no expense. A few days after Luna's statement, Bukele added that Luna's flight was not paid for by public funds. In November 2022, the National Civil Police initiated an investigation into Luna regarding his 2019 flights to Mexico. The Police Intelligence Subdirectorate alleged that Luna financed the flight with public funds.

In September 2021, Revista Factum alleged that Luna had illegally used US$8.5 million of funds from prison stores and that he had transferred deposits of US$300 to prisoners, twice the legal deposit amount. Revista Factum alleged that his actions violated at least four sections of the Regulations of the Penitentiary Law. Luna denied having transferred the deposits. That same month, the El Faro digital newspaper alleged that Luna, his mother, and a DGCP employee had illegally sold 42,909 food packets containing rice, beans, maize, and oil intended for COVID-19 patients as a part of the Health Emergency Program. El Faro alleged that Luna earned US$1,609,087.50 from the sales.

In September 2023, Cristosal, a non-governmental organization, petitioned the office of the attorney general to launch an investigation into Luna alleged corruption and crimes committed as General Director of Penal Centers.

=== Allegations of negotiating with gangs ===
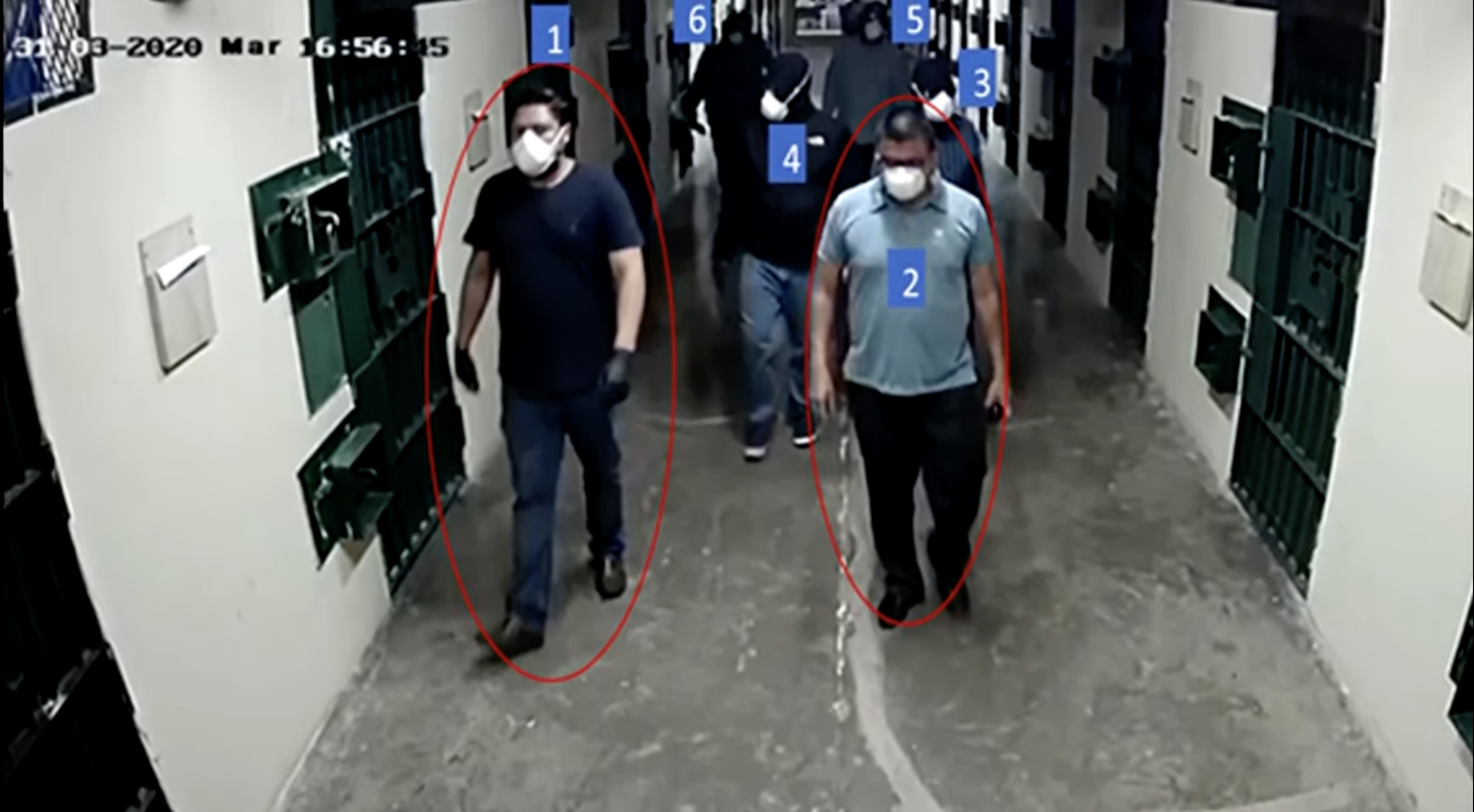
Video surveillance inside a prison supposedly depicting Luna (labeled 1) during alleged negotiations with gangs.

In September 2020, the El Faro alleged that Luna and Carlos Marroquín, the chairman of the Social Fabric Reconstruction Unit, had secretly negotiated with the country's criminal gangs on behalf of Bukele's government. El Faro claimed that it acquired logbooks reportedly showing Luna and Marroquín entering the Zacatecoluca and Izalco prisons to meet and negotiate with imprisoned gang leaders. El Faro alleged that both men negotiated allowing prison privileges, repeal anti-gang laws, and transfer specific prison guards the gang members viewed as being aggressive in exchange for the gangs supporting Nuevas Ideas in the upcoming 2021 legislative election. Bukele denied the allegations made against Luna and Marroquín. Luna also denied the allegations, stating that "I have not and will not participate in any such meeting [...] these kinds of activities aren't who I am".

In July 2021, the United States Department of State named Luna as one of six Salvadoran government officials involved in acts of corruption. His named was added to the Engel List— a report which lists individuals in Central America accused of corruption or undermining democracy— and subsequently had his travel visa to the United States canceled. On 8 December 2021, the United States Department of the Treasury sanctioned both Luna and Marroquín, claiming that both secretly negotiated with criminal gangs in El Salvador to lower the country's homicide rate and support the government in exchange for privileges for imprisoned gang leaders. Following the sanctions against Luna being instated, the United States Department of Justice began preparing indictments against both Luna and Marroquín for allegedly negotiating a truce with the gangs. Bukele rejected the sanctions against both Luna and Marroquín as "absurd" and described it as the United States demanding "absolute submission".

== See also ==
- Cabinet of Nayib Bukele

Legal offices
Preceded by Orlando Elías Molina Ríos (interim)	General Director of Penal Centers; 2019–present	Incumbent
Political offices
New office	Vice Minister of Justice and Public Security; 2019–present	Incumbent
