= Andry Hernández Romero =

Venezuelan make-up artist and activist

- Born: May 21, 1993 (age 33); Táchira, Venezuela
- Education: Santiago Mariño Polytechnic University Institute
- Occupations: Make-up artist, activist
- Known for: Being deported to an El Salvador megaprison; activism

Andry José Hernández Romero (born May 21, 1993) is a Venezuelan make-up artist and activist. He sought asylum in the United States due to his identity as gay and his political views. He first became internationally known upon being deported to CECOT by the U.S. government during the March 2025 American deportations of Venezuelans. He was released back into Venezuela during a prisoner exchange, and is currently seeking asylum in Spain. He has been an activist against the U.S. government's immigration policies.

== Early life and career ==
Andry José Hernández Romero was born on May 21, 1993, in Capacho Nuevo, Independencia Municipality, Táchira, Venezuela, to Venezuelan parents. He has a younger brother. From age 7, he served as an actor in the local Reyes Magos de Capacho festival. He attended the Santiago Mariño Polytechnic University Institute, studying industrial engineering, but dropped out after his fifth semester, to focus on a career as a makeup artist. He also made costumes and designed. During this time, he obtained tattoos that, according to his family and friends, are of his mother and father's names and of designs (a crown on each wrist and a snake on his forearm) associated with the Reyes Magos de Capacho festival. Romero worked as a makeup artist at a government-affiliated television channel, but, according to him, his mother, and his friends, faced persecution for his status as gay and his refusal to support what they called government propaganda.

== Seeking asylum and return to Venezuela ==
On May 23, 2024, Romero left Venezuela to seek asylum in the United States, and officially arrived in the United States for his CBP One appointment on August 29 of that year. He was immediately detained due to his tattoos, which resulted in governmental suspicion that he was a part of the Venezuelan gang Tren de Aragua. However, according to his confidante and childhood friend Reina Cárdenas, his asylum case went well and both the lawyers and the judge assured him he would be granted asylum soon.

In March 2025, during the March 2025 American deportations of Venezuelans and after the start of the Second presidency of Donald Trump, Romero was deported to CECOT in El Salvador under the Alien Enemies Act. He was unable to be reached or to get in touch with his family, friends, or attorneys. He soon received support both locally, with certificates provided by the mayor of Capacho Nuevo and a petition signed by over 600 residents, and internationally, both from ordinary people and from elected U.S. officials including Gavin Newsom, Mark Takano, and Robert Garcia, who raised the situation to the then-U.S. Ambassador. He has alleged that he faced sexual assault from prison staff at CECOT, and also claimed he was repeatedly beaten.

On July 18, 2025, Romero was released from CECOT as part of a prisoner swap and returned to Venezuela. He received a warm welcome from his hometown of Capacho Nuevo and his family. He also kept in touch with his fellow Venezuelan asylum-seekers turned CECOT prisoners, and did the makeup for one of his fellow CECOT prisoners' bride on their wedding shortly after.

Romero has stated that a few weeks after returning home, he received a job offer from the office of then-Vice President of Venezuela Delcy Rodríguez. He continued, stating that despite declining due to what he called "the government (having)... persecuted him as a gay man", officials then came to his house. On September 8, 2025, Romero met virtually with U.S. Representative Mark Takano to discuss his claimed injuries. He was named to the Out100 in 2025.

== Current status and lawsuit ==
In early February 2026, after Delcy Rodríguez became President of Venezuela, Romero left Venezuela to seek asylum in Spain, due to their more open immigration process and his having relatives in the country. As of June 2026, his asylum application was still in progress. He has stated that he feels a responsibility to help the "many innocent people in prisons today", and has claimed he is carrying on an activism campaign in support of immigrants and children. He stated he still feels fear when seeing handcuffs or police equipment.

In March 2026, Romero filed a claim against the U.S. government under the Federal Tort Claims Act due to him being held in CECOT for 125 days.
