= Santiago Mariño Polytechnic University Institute =

University in Venezuela

- Instituto Universitario Politécnico "Santiago Mariño"
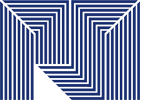
- Motto: Training for excellence!
- Type: Private
- Established: September 17, 1991
- Founder: Dr. Raúl Quero Silva
- Location: Barcelona, Venezuela
- Campus: Av. Intercomunal Andrés Bello, Parroquia El Carmen, Simón Bolívar, Anzoátegui.
- Website: http://psm.edu.ve

The Santiago Mariño Polytechnic University Institute (Spanish: Instituto Universitario Politécnico "Santiago Mariño", IUPSM) is a private university located in Barcelona, Venezuela.

== History ==
The institution was created on September 17, 1991, by Dr. Raúl Quero Silva in Barcelona and it started its functions as a university by the presidential decree Nº 1.893. The academic activities started for the first time in October 1991 with Architecture and Engineering classes. In the year 1993, the institution expanded its coverage and educational offer by creating extensions in different cities.

The institute belongs to a network of Higher education universities called "Educational Complex "Antonio José de Sucre". It offers its students services such as free dental care, student insurance, scholarships, sports activities, Venezuelan culture, and recreational and educational activities. It also counts a large number of chemical, electrical, and computer laboratories.

== Notable Students ==
Andry Hernández Romero, makeup artist and activist (dropped out after fifth semester).

== Gallery ==
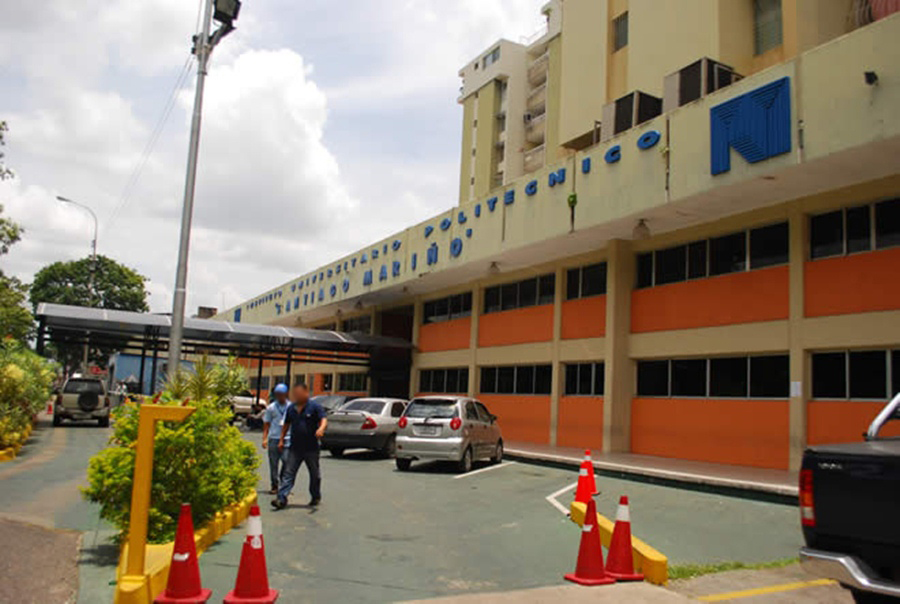
Campus in Maturín

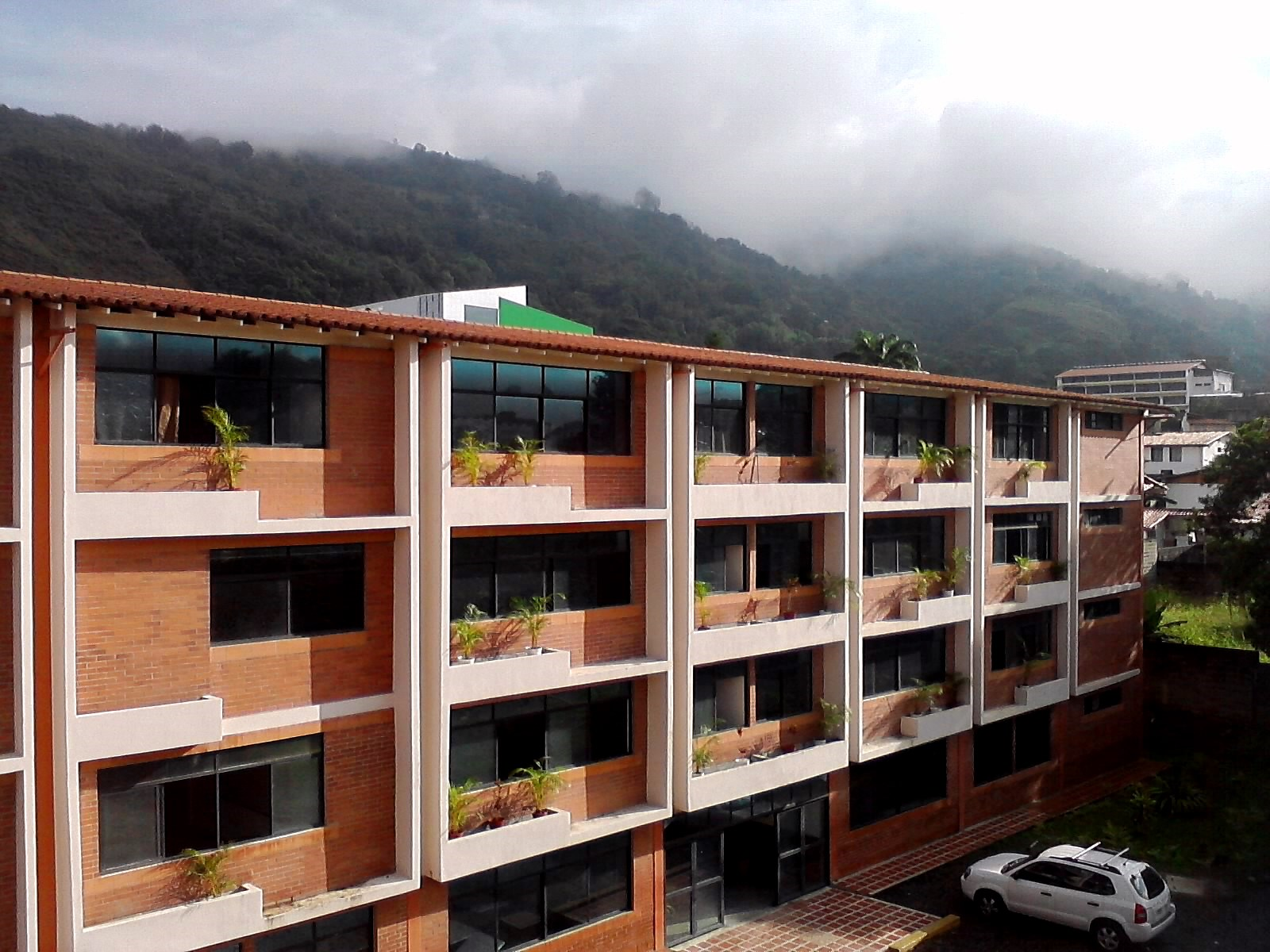
Campus in Mérida

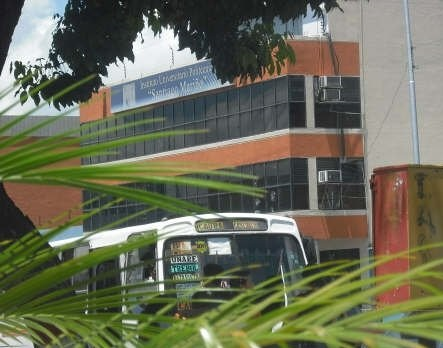
Campus in Puerto Ordaz

== See also ==
- List of universities in Venezuela
- Santiago Mariño
- Media related to Instituto Universitario Politécnico Santiago Mariño at Wikimedia Commons
