= CECOT =

Maximum security prison in El Salvador

Terrorism Confinement Center
- Logo

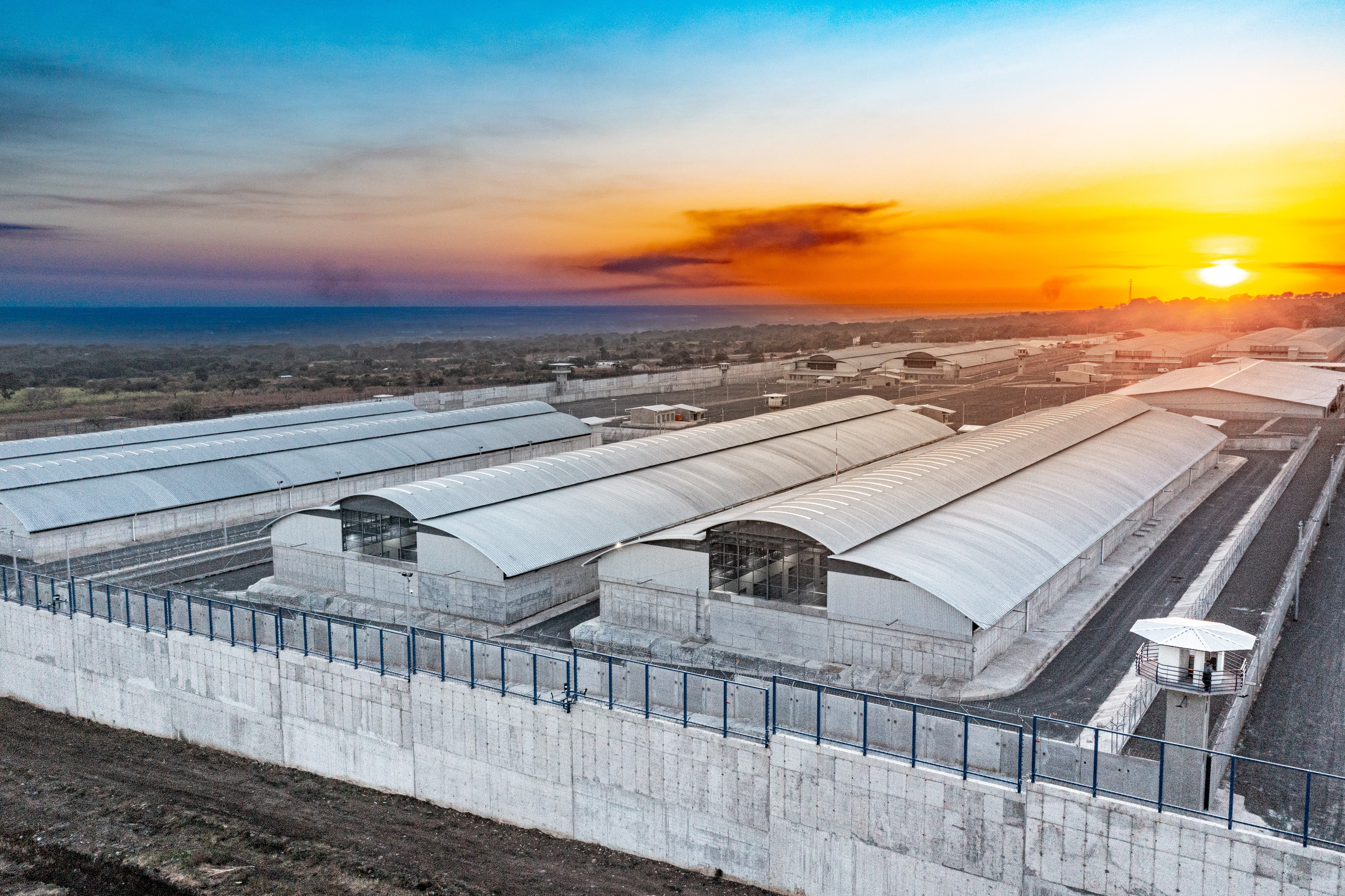
- Aerial view of the facility

- Location (El Salvador)
- Interactive map of Terrorism Confinement Center
- Location: Tecoluca, El Salvador; 13°32′01″N 88°48′18″W
- Status: Operational
- Security class: Maximum security prison
- Capacity: 40,000
- Population: 14,532 (11 June 2024)
- Opened: 31 January 2023; 3 years ago
- Managed by: Ministry of Justice and Public Security of El Salvador
- Director: Belarmino García

The Terrorism Confinement Center (Spanish: Centro de Confinamiento del Terrorismo, abbreviated CECOT) is a maximum security prison in Tecoluca, El Salvador. The prison was built in late 2022 amid a large-scale gang crackdown in the country. The Salvadoran government opened the prison in late January 2023, and it began housing inmates the following month.

As of 11 June 2024, CECOT had a confirmed population of 14,532 inmates; in November 2024, prison director Belarmino García estimated that CECOT held between 15,000 and 20,000 inmates. With a capacity for 40,000 inmates, CECOT is the largest prison in Latin America and one of the largest in the world by prisoner capacity. In March 2025, the Salvadoran government accepted over 200 deportees that the second Donald Trump administration alleged were Venezuelan and Salvadoran gang members and incarcerated them in CECOT. Among them was Kilmar Abrego Garcia, whose case received widespread media attention in the United States. The Venezuelans incarcerated in CECOT were repatriated to Venezuela in July 2025 following a prisoner swap involving El Salvador, the United States, and Venezuela.

CECOT is controversial, receiving praise for its detention of alleged gang members and criticism for alleged human rights abuses, including overcrowding, lack of due process, and inhumane conditions. CECOT does not engage in rehabilitation. Few inmates have been released from the facility and authorities have said in media statements that there are no plans to release any other prisoners.

The Salvadoran government has allowed selected media outlets access to participate in guided tours of the prison, while others such as United States senator Chris Van Hollen have been denied access. CECOT has been featured in several videos and documentaries published online, including in inmate intake videos published by Salvadoran president Nayib Bukele and documentaries such as 60 Minutes's "Inside CECOT".

== Background ==
=== Gang violence in El Salvador ===
Beginning in the 1990s, street gangs began to gain power and influence in El Salvador when their members began to be deported from the United States following the conclusion of the Salvadoran Civil War. The two largest street gangs were Mara Salvatrucha (commonly known as MS-13) and the 18th Street gang (Barrio 18, composed of the Revolucionarios and the Sureños factions); other smaller gangs included La Maquina, Mao Mao, and Mirada Loca. In El Salvador, these gangs recruited young Salvadorans who felt neglected by the Salvadoran government in the aftermath of the civil war. By 2020, there were an estimated 60,000 gang members and 400,000 collaborators in El Salvador.

Gangs enforced their influence and made money through murder, extortion, drug trafficking, and operating businesses. Gangs also influenced national politics by preventing political candidates from campaigning in certain neighborhoods under their control, and gang leaders have stated that they could determine the outcomes of elections. Due to gang violence, El Salvador had one of the highest homicide rates in the world, peaking at a rate of 103 homicides per 100,000 people in 2015.

=== Anti-crime policies ===
During the 1990s and 2000s, the various Nationalist Republican Alliance (ARENA) governments sought to implement "tough on crime" policies in El Salvador to combat the spread of gangs. In 2003 and 2004, the government implemented the Mano Dura ("iron fist") and Super Mano Dura ("super iron fist") policies that led to the arrests of 30,000 alleged gang members. In 2012, the Farabundo Martí National Liberation Front (FMLN) government, the Catholic Church in El Salvador, and the country's gangs agreed to a truce that initially lowered the country's homicide rate, but by 2014, the truce had faltered and homicides rose again. In 2015, the Supreme Court of Justice of El Salvador designated both MS-13 and Barrio 18 as terrorist organizations.

From 2019 to 2020, El Salvador's homicide rate decreased by up to 62 percent. Salvadoran president Nayib Bukele credited the decrease to his Territorial Control Plan, but a 2020 analysis by the International Crisis Group (ICG) found "no causal relationship" between the decrease in homicides and the Territorial Control Plan. Instead, the ICG attributed the decrease to "quiet, informal understandings between gangs and the government"; the Salvadoran government denied the claim. In December 2021, the United States Department of the Treasury accused Bukele's government of negotiating with the gangs to reduce homicides; Bukele denied the accusation.

=== Salvadoran gang crackdown ===
From 25 to 27 March 2022, gangs in El Salvador killed 87 people, 62 of whom were killed on 26 March alone, the deadliest day in Salvadoran history since the end of the civil war in 1992. Florida International University research director José Miguel Cruz attributed the murder spike to the breakdown of the alleged truce between gangs and the government.

In response to the violence, the Legislative Assembly of El Salvador declared a state of exception that suspended several constitutional rights and made it easier for the country's security forces to conduct mass arrests of suspected gang members. In the following seven months, around 55,000 suspected gang members were arrested. Due to the large number of arrests, Bukele announced the construction of a new prison with a capacity for 40,000 inmates—named the Terrorism Confinement Center (stylized CECOT)—to house those arrested during the gang crackdown. CECOT was built by three companies (OMNI, DISA, and Contratista General de América Latina, S.A. de C.V.) and construction cost US$100 million. By the time CECOT opened in January 2023, the Salvadoran government had arrested over 62,000 suspected gang members.

== Prison facility ==
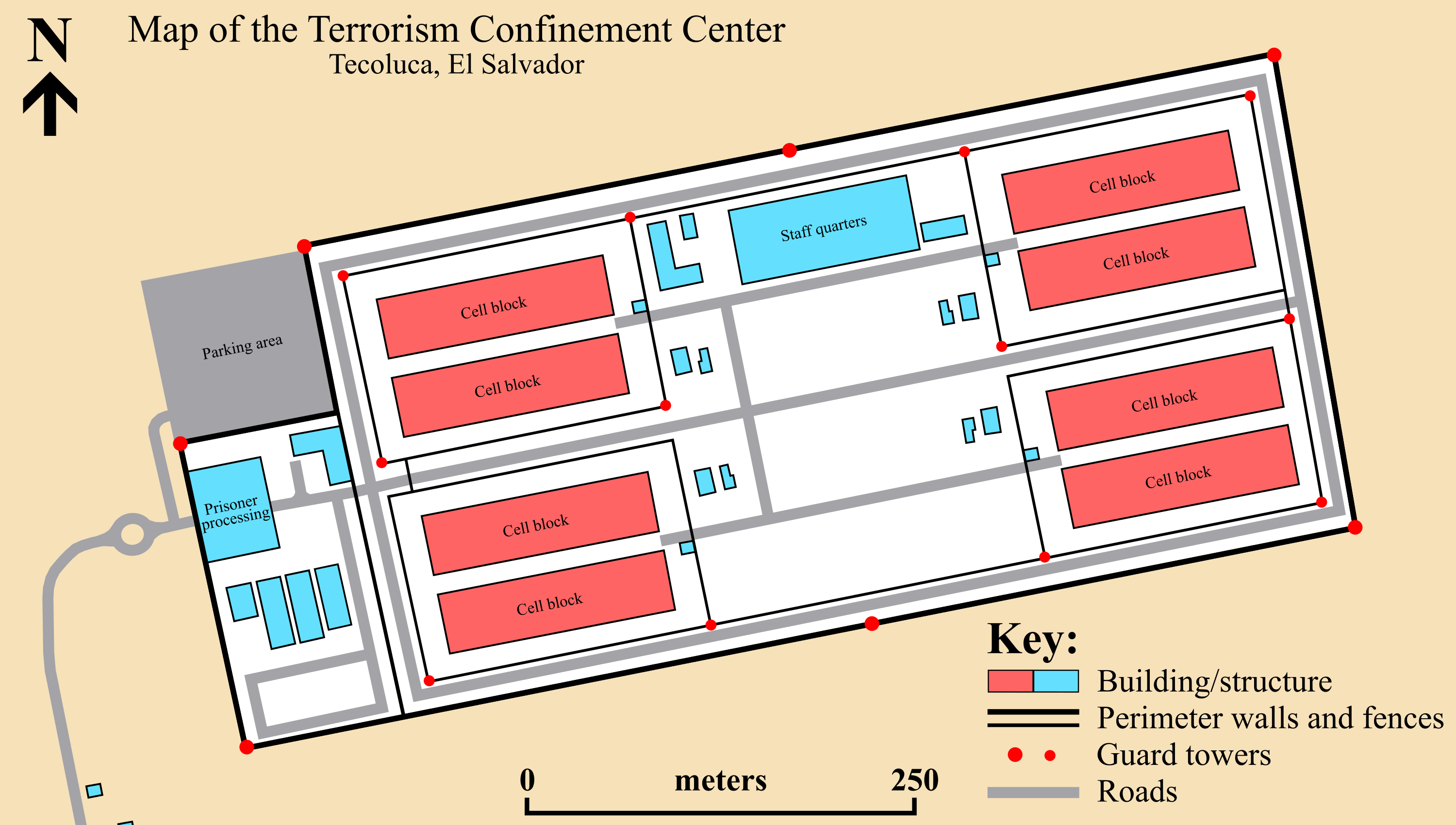
A map of the Terrorism Confinement Center's layout

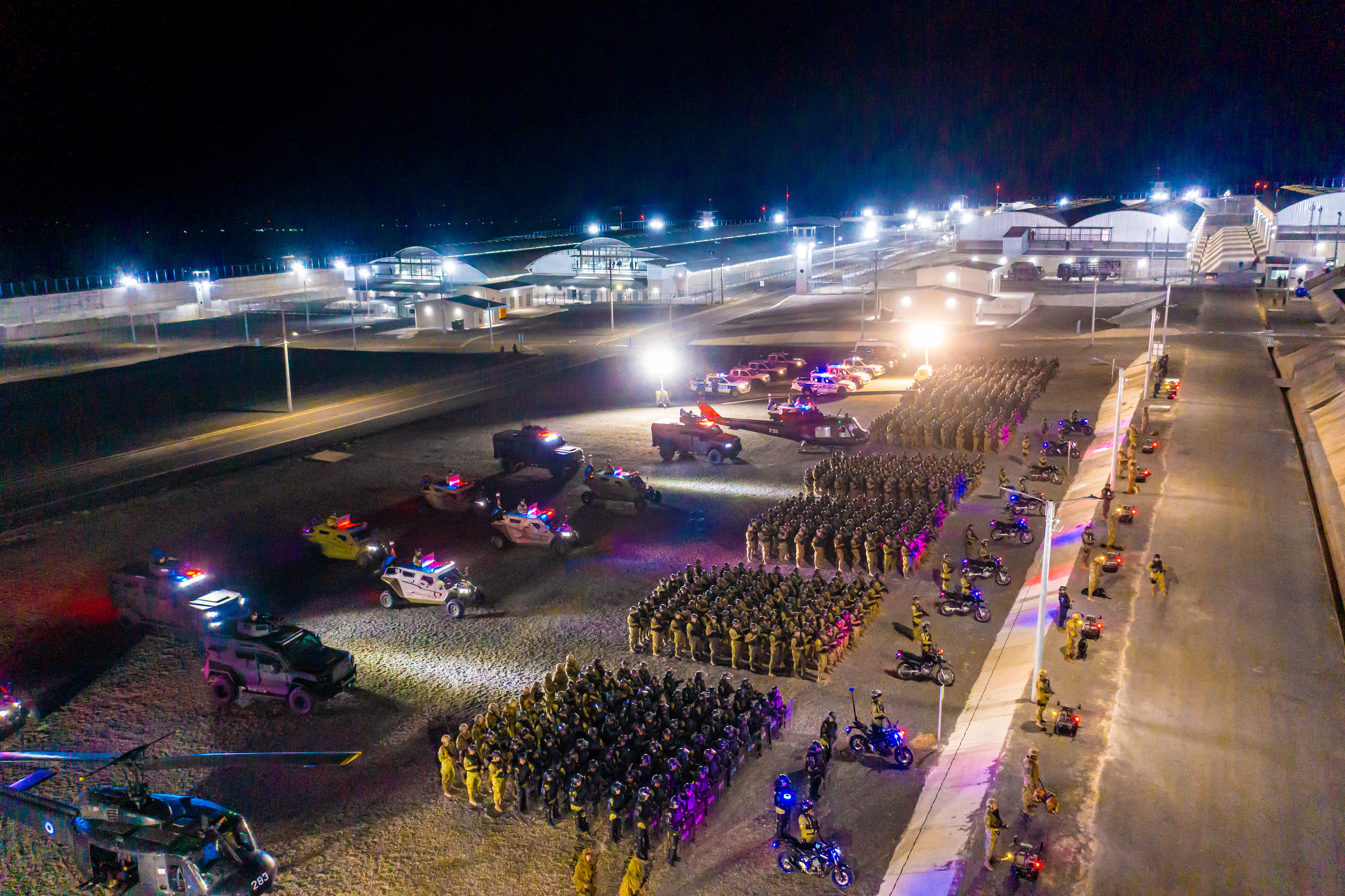
Soldiers and police officers that staff the prison

The CECOT facility covers 23 hectares (57 acres) and the Salvadoran government oversees the surrounding 140 hectares (350 acres) around the prison. It is located in the district of Tecoluca in a remote area of the San Vicente Department at the base of the San Vicente volcano. CECOT has the capacity for 40,000 inmates in eight cell blocks; cell space covers 2.4 hectares (6 acres) for an average of 0.6 square meters (6.5 sq ft) of space per prisoner. In April 2025, Bukele stated that he intended to double CECOT's capacity to 80,000 inmates. The prison is surrounded by 19 guard towers, two sets of 9-meter-tall (30 ft) and 60-centimeter-thick (24 in) walls, topped with barbed wire, two sets of electrified fences, and gravel flooring designed to make footsteps audible.

Each of the 256 cells can house an average of 156 inmates. The cells are equipped with four-level metal bunks with no mattresses or sheets, two toilets, and two washbasins. The cells are lit by artificial lights 24 hours per day. Each cell is provided with two Bibles, and CCTV cameras and armed guards monitor each cell. Solitary confinement cells can hold prisoners for up to 15 days and are only furnished with a concrete bed, a toilet, and a washbasin. The solitary cells only have one small hole in the ceiling that allows some light inside.

CECOT is staffed by 600 soldiers and 250 police officers. Belarmino García is the prison's director. Prison staff are provided recreational areas such as a dining hall, break room, and gym. Everyone entering the prison undergoes a physical search and an X-ray scan. Medical staff are present on site and administer all aid to prisoners within the prison's confines.

== Inmates ==
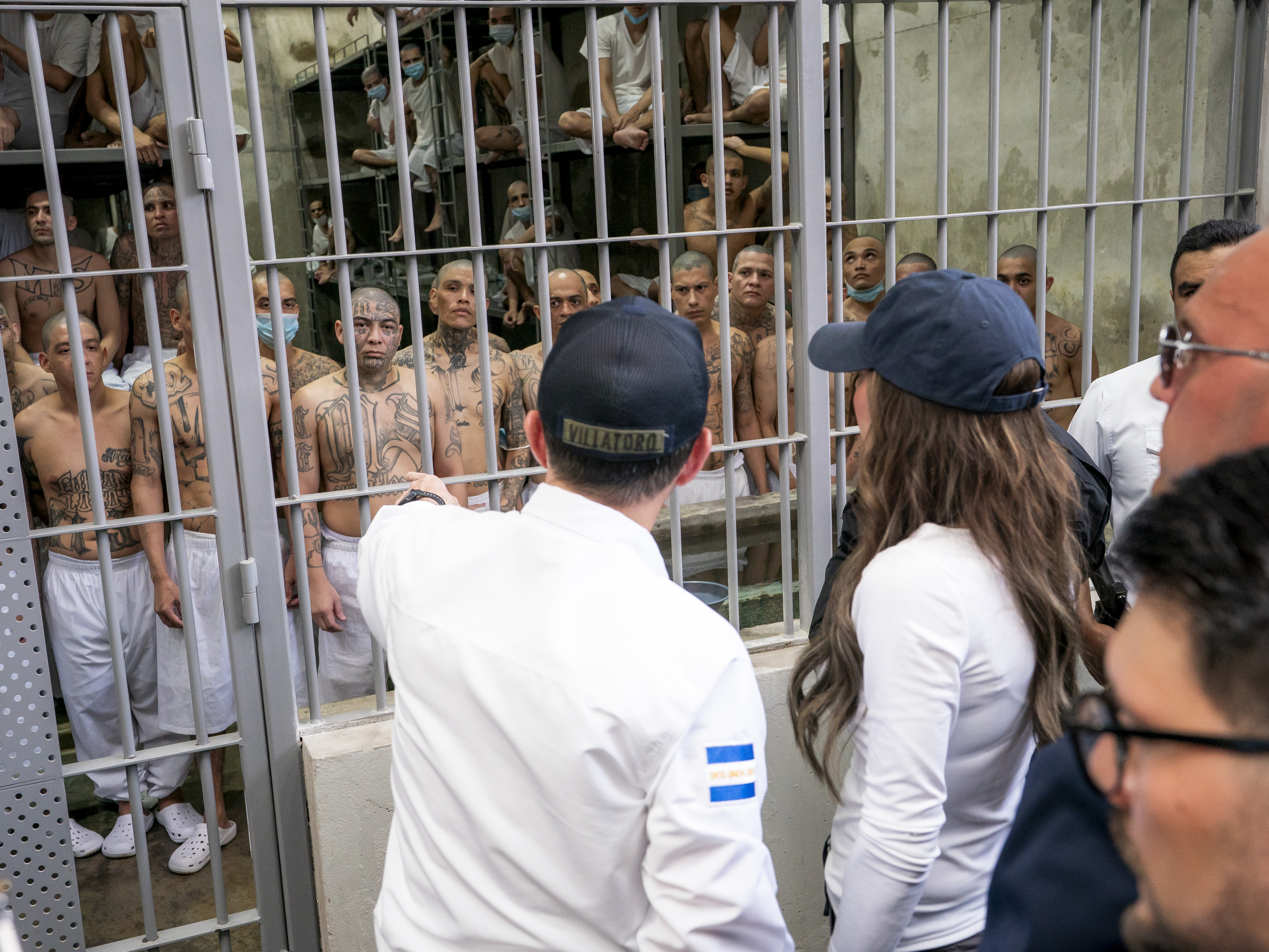
Salvadoran justice minister Gustavo Villatoro and U.S. homeland security secretary Kristi Noem observing inmates inside a cell in CECOT, March 2025

The Salvadoran government rarely announces how many prisoners are incarcerated at CECOT, with only a few such public announcements since the prison opened. CECOT had a reported population of 14,532 inmates in June 2024. In November 2024, García estimated that between 10,000 and 20,000 inmates were housed at CECOT. In March 2025, a government spokesperson declined to provide an updated figure, citing security concerns, but said that the 2024 statistic of 14,500 inmates was outdated. In April 2025, García stated the population was closer to its 40,000 maximum population, but declined to give a specific number.

The criteria for becoming incarcerated in CECOT are unclear, other than that the Salvadoran government states that it houses "high-ranking" gang members. Members of rival gangs are not separated. García has described those imprisoned at CECOT as "the worst of the worst". Many inmates have been sentenced to centuries-long sentences, while other inmates have yet to be convicted. Those detained are reported to have been tried en masse with no opportunity to present counter-evidence or see the evidence against them.

Prisoners wear all-white uniforms and their heads are shaved every five days. Prisoners are only allowed outside their cells for 30 minutes of exercise, Bible study, online court hearings within the prison, or for placement into solitary confinement. Prisoners are not allowed education, recreation, visitation, or phone calls. Prisoners are provided meals of rice, beans, eggs, and pasta, but utensils are not provided as they could potentially become weapons. The Salvadoran government does not plan to release any prisoner from CECOT, and Minister of Justice and Public Security Gustavo Villatoro has stated that prisoners incarcerated at CECOT will never return to their communities. Villatoro also ruled out rehabilitation programs for CECOT's inmates.

=== Detention of foreign prisoners ===
On 3 February 2025, Bukele met with United States Secretary of State Marco Rubio and offered to accept "dangerous American [convicted] criminals" and incarcerate them at CECOT "in exchange for a fee". Rubio described Bukele's offer as the "most unprecedented and extraordinary migratory agreement anywhere in the world".

On 15 March 2025, the United States announced that it would deport 300 alleged gang members of Tren de Aragua to El Salvador to be imprisoned in CECOT without trial, using the Alien Enemies Act of 1798. According to El Salvador's Ministry of Foreign Affairs, the Donald Trump administration will pay the Salvadoran government US$6 million to hold the 300 prisoners for one year "pending the United States' decision on their long term disposition". James Boasberg, the chief judge of the United States District Court for the District of Columbia, blocked the deportations from proceeding, but 238 alleged Tren de Aragua members and 23 alleged MS-13 members were deported regardless. One of the three deportation flights departed the United States after Boasberg blocked the deportations, causing controversy over whether the Trump administration ignored a court order. According to Time, prisoners were physically bludgeoned and had their heads forcibly shaved during their processing. A 60 Minutes investigation failed to find any criminal charges against 179 of those deported, while about a dozen had been charged with crimes such as murder, rape, assault, or kidnapping.

External videos
- Arrival of 261 alleged MS-13 and Tren de Aragua members
- Arrival of 17 alleged MS-13 and Tren de Aragua members

Bukele published a three-minute video to X showing the prisoners' arrival. The Venezuelan government condemned the deportation, and Jorge Rodríguez, the president of the National Assembly of Venezuela, stated that the government would "not rest [...] until they rescue the kidnapped [Venezuelans] in El Salvador" ("no vamos a descansar [...] hasta que rescatemos a los secuestrados en El Salvador"). An anonymous source within the United States Department of State said that it feared the deported Venezuelans could die in CECOT.

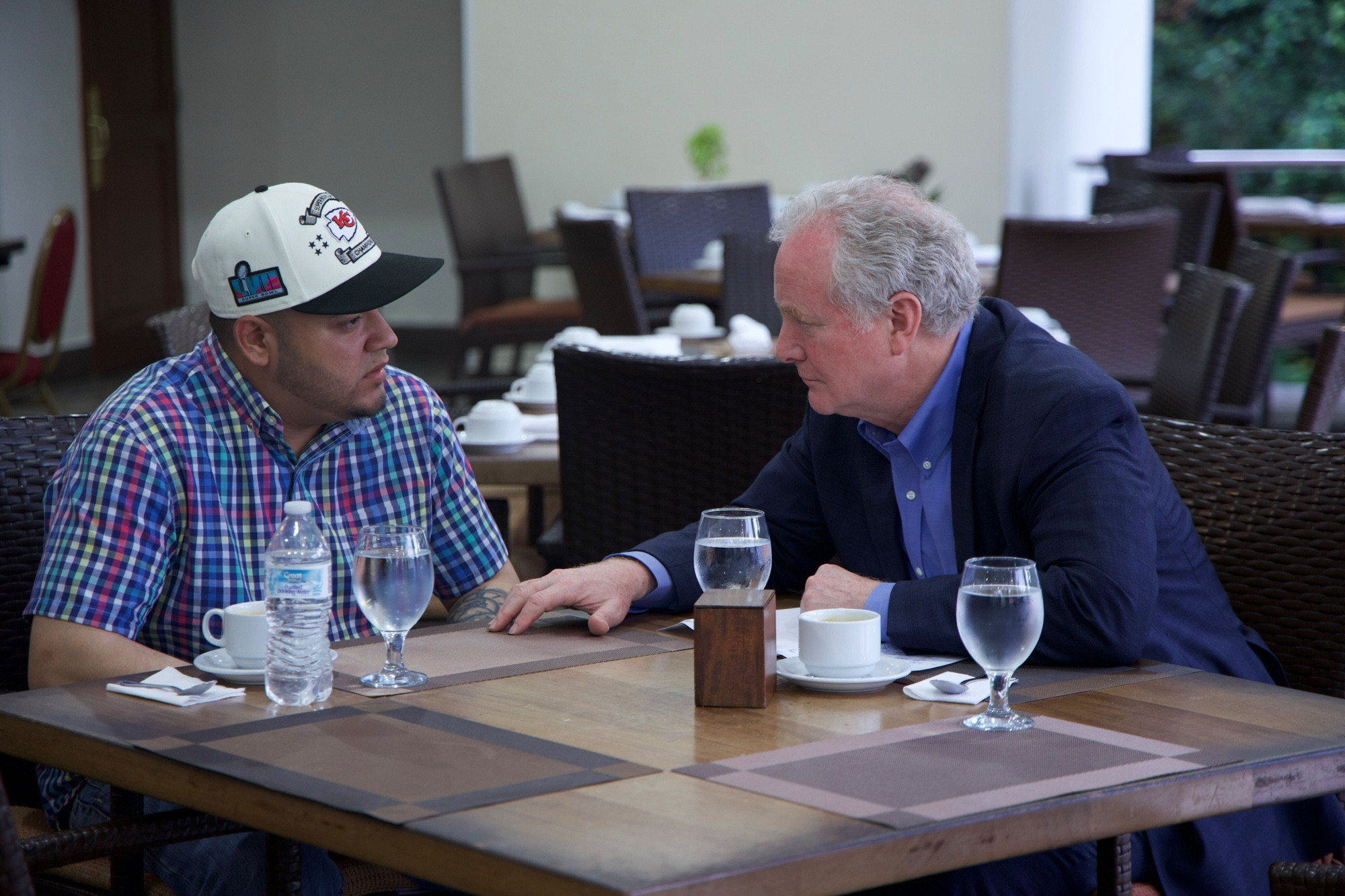
U.S. senator Chris Van Hollen with Kilmar Abrego Garcia, one of the 261 people deported by the U.S. to El Salvador and incarcerated in CECOT in mid March 2025

United States Secretary of Homeland Security Kristi Noem visited CECOT on 26 March 2025 and threatened illegal immigrants in the United States with deportation to El Salvador and incarceration in CECOT if they did not leave the country. The U.S. deported 17 more people to El Salvador on 31 March, alleging that they were MS-13 and Tren de Aragua. The U.S. government stated that the deportations occurred using regular immigration laws and not the Alien Enemies Act.

On 7 April, the Supreme Court of the United States lifted Boasberg's order, allowing the Trump administration to use the Alien Enemies Act to deport people from the country but only after they had been given a court hearing on the matter. In a meeting between Trump and Bukele at the Oval Office on 14 April, White House press secretary Karoline Leavitt stated that Trump was interested in deporting "heinous, violent criminals" who were American citizens to El Salvador; Cato Institute immigration expert David Bier stated that "U.S. citizens may not be deported to imprisonment abroad. There is no authority for that in any U.S. law." Trump further suggested to Bukele that he should "build about five more places" like CECOT.

Among the prisoners deported to El Salvador was Salvadoran citizen Kilmar Abrego Garcia, who was initially incarcerated at CECOT; his case received widespread media attention in the United States as he had been deported due to an "administrative error". In April 2025, U.S. senator Chris Van Hollen met Abrego Garcia, who informed him that he had been transferred to another prison in Santa Ana. Abrego Garcia told Van Hollen that he "experienced trauma" while in CECOT. After the meeting, Bukele tweeted that Abrego Garcia would remain in Salvadoran custody. In June 2025 Abrego Garcia was brought back to the U.S., after being charged with human smuggling and accused of numerous other crimes that had not previously been alleged; a court later found that there was "no credible evidence". After his return, his attorneys filed legal documents claiming he had been subjected to "severe beatings, severe sleep deprivation, inadequate nutrition, and psychological torture" in CECOT. Bukele disputed this claim, publishing videos and images of Abrego Garcia participating in prisoner programs after he had left CECOT and asking "If he'd been tortured, sleep-deprived, and starved, why does he look so well in every picture?" Also among the prisoners deported was Venezuelan makeup artist Andry Hernández Romero, who was deported due to his tattoos.

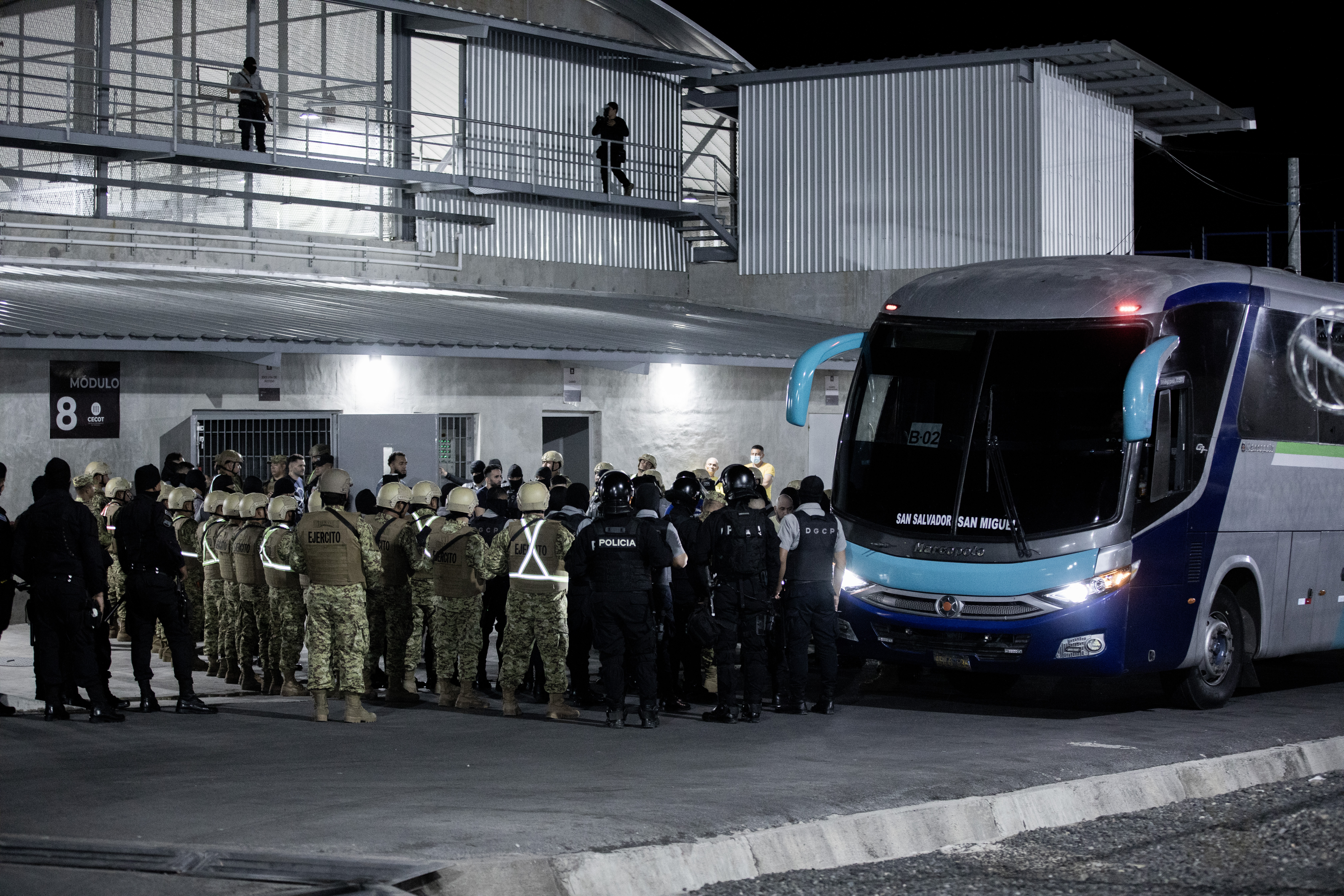
Venezuelans being released from CECOT

On 20 April 2025, Bukele offered to conduct a prisoner exchange with the Venezuelan government, offering to repatriate the 252 Venezuelans sent to CECOT by the U.S. in exchange for the Venezuelan government releasing 252 "political prisoners". Venezuelan attorney general Tarek William Saab demanded "proof of life and a medical report" of each Venezuelan. On 18 July 2025, the American, Salvadoran, and Venezuelan governments conducted a prisoner swap. All the Venezuelans incarcerated in CECOT were released and returned to Venezuela in exchange for the release of ten Americans in Venezuelan custody.

After their release from CECOT, the Venezuelan detainees described abuses in media interviews and exchanges with their lawyers including repeated beatings, being shot with rubber bullets, constant light, deprivation of hygiene materials, and poor food and water. Saab announced that the Venezuelan government would investigate Bukele, Villatoro, and General Director of Penal Centers Osiris Luna Meza claiming that there had been "systemic torture" of the Venezuelans detained in CECOT. In late March 2026 a group of human rights organizations filed a petition with the Inter-American Commission on Human Rights on behalf of detainees asking that the Commission declare El Salvador's agreement with the US violated its human rights obligations and that El Salvador should provide a public apology, reparations, and rehabilitation resources.

== Media coverage ==
=== Salvadoran government ===
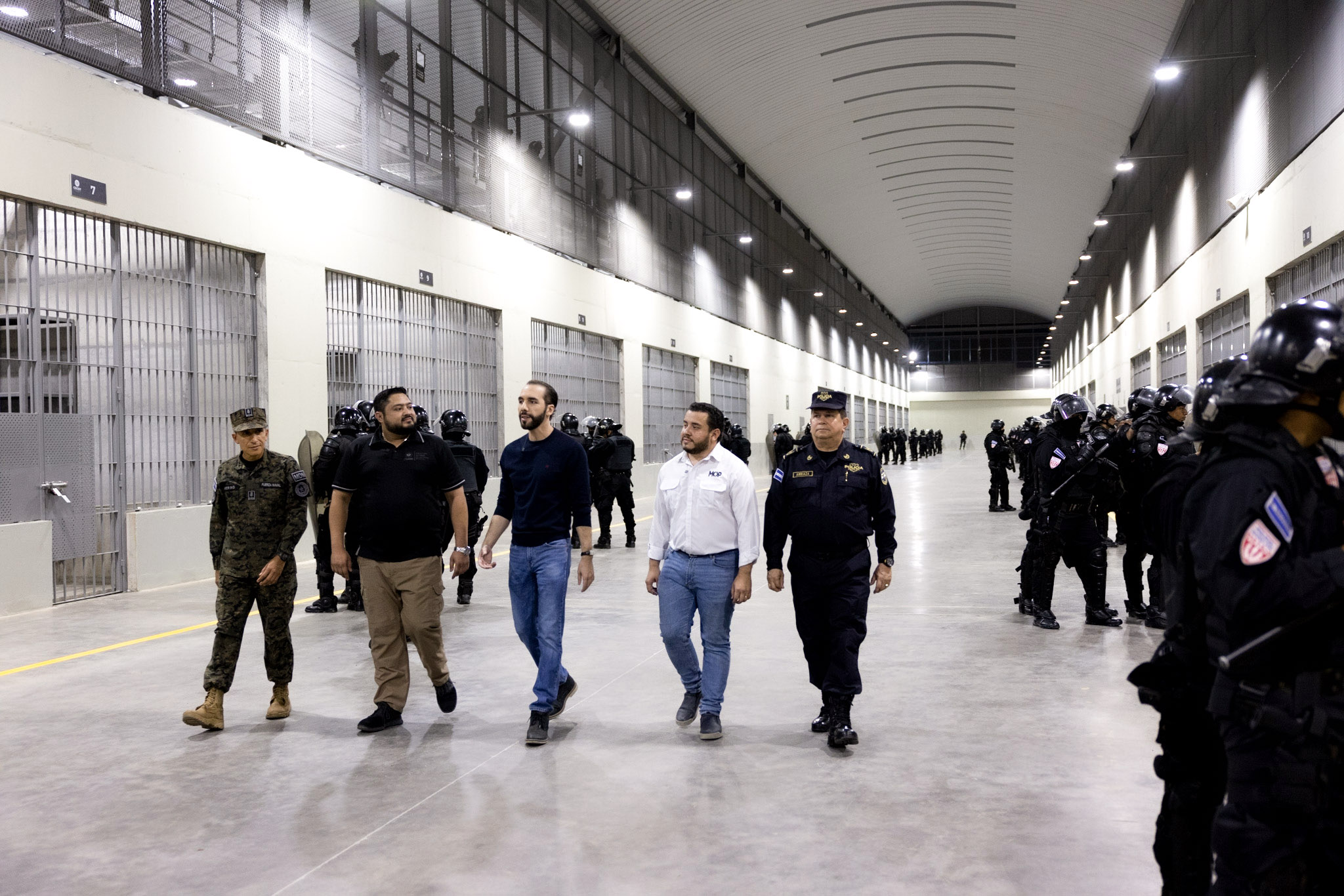
From left to right, Minister of Defense René Merino Monroy, Director of Penal Centers Osiris Luna Meza, President Nayib Bukele, Minister of Public Works Romeo Rodríguez, and Director of the National Civil Police Mauricio Arriaza Chicas touring CECOT in January 2023

External videos
- Nayib Bukele and his government officials touring CECOT in January 2023
- February 2023 prisoner transfer
- March 2023 prisoner transfer
- June 2024 prisoner transfer

On 1 February 2023, Bukele posted a video to Twitter of himself, Mena, Director of the National Civil Police Mauricio Arriaza Chicas, Minister of National Defense René Merino Monroy, and Minister of Public Works Romeo Rodríguez touring CECOT before its opening. Later that month, he posted another video showing 2,000 prisoners, all with shaved heads and wearing only white gym shorts, being transferred into the prison. Bukele published similar videos for prisoner transfers in March 2023, June 2024, and March 2025.

Bukele himself has labeled CECOT as "the most criticized prison in the world" ("la cárcel más criticada del mundo"). Villatoro has remarked that CECOT represents "the biggest monument to justice we have ever built".

=== International press ===
Several foreign news outlets chronicled CECOT's first prison transfer including the BBC, The New York Times, and The Washington Post. Several online commentators also reported on the transfer.

The Associated Press' Marcos Alemán described CECOT as the "crown jewel" of the Salvadoran gang crackdown. DW Español's María Santacecilia described CECOT as the "emblem of Bukele's iron fist" ("emblema de la mano dura de Bukele"). El País' Juan Diego Quesada referred to CECOT as "the Alcatraz of Central America". CECOT has also been referred to as a "mega-prison". Reuters described CECOT as "controversial" and as being "known for its harsh conditions."

CNN's Michael Rios noted that inmates were "visibly disturbed" as an officer shouted at them to "submit from this moment on". The Associated Press wrote that Bukele made "stark, harsh prisons a trademark of his fight against crime". Journalists Christopher Mathias and Adam Serwer, writing for MSNBC and The Atlantic respectively, referred to CECOT as a "gulag". Colombian president Gustavo Petro has similarly labeled CECOT as a "concentration camp" ("campo de concentración").

The Salvadoran government has offered news outlets access to tour CECOT. In September 2023, Colombian news outlet Noticias Caracol became the first news outlet allowed to enter CECOT. Since then, other news outlets have been granted access to CECOT such as the BBC and CNN. YouTubers such as Ruhi Çenet have also been granted access to CECOT. García has stated that non-governmental organizations (NGOs) are not allowed inside CECOT. In July 2024, United States House representative Matt Gaetz visited CECOT and referred to it as "the solution" for El Salvador.

In December 2025, a 60 Minutes segment on the prison by correspondent Sharyn Alfonsi titled "Inside CECOT" was postponed just before the scheduled broadcast within the US, generating widespread criticism in the US. Despite the last minute attempt to stop the broadcast, the segment continued to be released per schedule via a Global Television Network streaming service and was downloaded and distributed across other Internet services despite CBS News efforts to prevent distribution using DMCA take down notices.

In June 2026, Richard Madeley visited CECOT Prison for several days for the British Channel 5 documentary Inside the World's Mega Prison.

== Allegations of human rights abuses ==
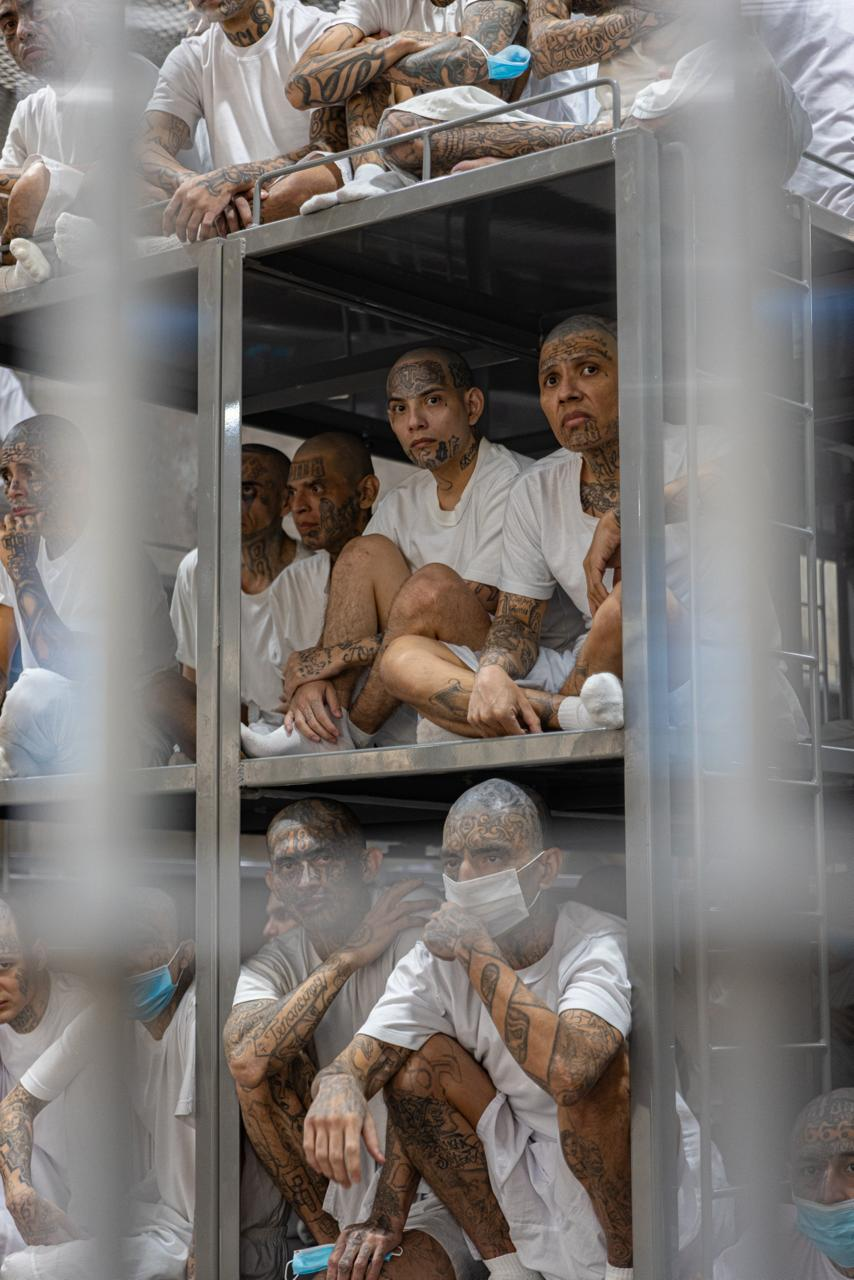
Prisoners on bunk beds

The BBC has indicated that CECOT does not adhere to the Red Cross' international standard that recommends that each prisoner receives at least 3.4 square meters (37 sq ft) of space in a cell; CECOT on average gives prisoners 0.6 square meters (6.5 sq ft) of space. Martin Horn, a former administrator of the Rikers Island prison in the United States, stated that 40,000 prisoners is "too many to manage in one place [...] under any circumstances", referring to the prison's listed capacity. There are not enough bunks for every prisoner assigned to each cell; when the BBC asked García what the maximum capacity of each cell was, he replied that "where you can fit 10 people, you can fit 20". Emerson College political scientist Mneesha Gellman said that people held in CECOT face "severe overcrowding" and "inadequate food".

The BBC has also indicated that prisoners are deprived of rights such as outside recreation and family visitation outlined by international guidelines. Juan Carlos Sánchez, a program officer of the Due Process of Law Foundation, raised concerns about the quality of food served at CECOT. He also questioned the status of due process as the prison incarcerated both convicted criminals and individuals on trial for their alleged crimes. He warns that prisoners could become "sick physically, mentally" and "come out with rage". Antonio Durán, a senior judge in Zacatecoluca, said that the conditions in CECOT amount to "torture". Zaira Navas, a legal advisor at the Cristosal NGO, states that it is difficult to monitor conditions inside CECOT and that conditions "might become inhumane and degrading because no-one has access to that prison". Doug Specht, a human rights scholar at the University of Westminster, wrote in The SAIS Review of International Affairs that conditions in CECOT "fall significantly short of accepted norms for the humane treatment of prisoners".

After being returned to the United States, Abrego Garcia alleged in court filings that he was subjected to "severe beatings, severe sleep deprivation, inadequate nutrition, and psychological torture". He alleges that he and 20 other inmates were made to kneel from 9 p.m. to 6 a.m., with guards beating anyone who fell from exhaustion. He claimed he soiled himself when he was denied bathroom breaks. In two weeks, his weight allegedly dropped from 215 to 184 pounds (97.5 to 83.5 kg). The document claims that CECOT prison officials repeatedly told him that they would transfer him to the cells containing gang members who, they assured him, would 'tear' him apart. He said he repeatedly observed prisoners in nearby cells who he understood to be gang members violently harm each other with no intervention from guards or personnel.

Amnesty International raised concerns that CECOT "could threaten human rights" ("podría amenazar DD.HH") and that the prison represented "politics of mass incarceration" ("política de encarcelamiento masivo"). Amnesty International further remarked that CECOT has "worsened the human rights situation in El Salvador" and set "an alarming precedent of repressive cooperation between governments" resulting in enforced disappearance, referring to the U.S. deportations of 261 Salvadorans and Venezuelans. Miguel Sarre, a former member of the United Nations Subcommittee for the Prevention of Torture, described CECOT as a "concrete and steel pit" used to "dispose of people without formally applying the death penalty", citing that the government has not confirmed that inmates have been released from CECOT. Kavan Applegate, the chairman of the International Corrections and Prisons Association's design committee, remarked that CECOT is "warehousing" people. Gustavo Fondevila, a professor of law at the Center for Economic Research and Teaching, described CECOT as a "political campaign project, the typical campaign project of pure, hard penal populism".

In response to criticism of alleged human rights abuses, García told CNN that "much has been said about CECOT and human rights violations, but you are seeing everything we do—medical assistance, ensuring they follow due process [...] the whole operation is based on strict respect for human rights". On 12 September 2023, the Supreme Court of Justice and the Legislative Assembly approved a provision that allowed courts in Usulután and Cojutepeque—known as surveillance courts—to monitor the rights of individuals imprisoned in CECOT.

== Influence on other prisons ==
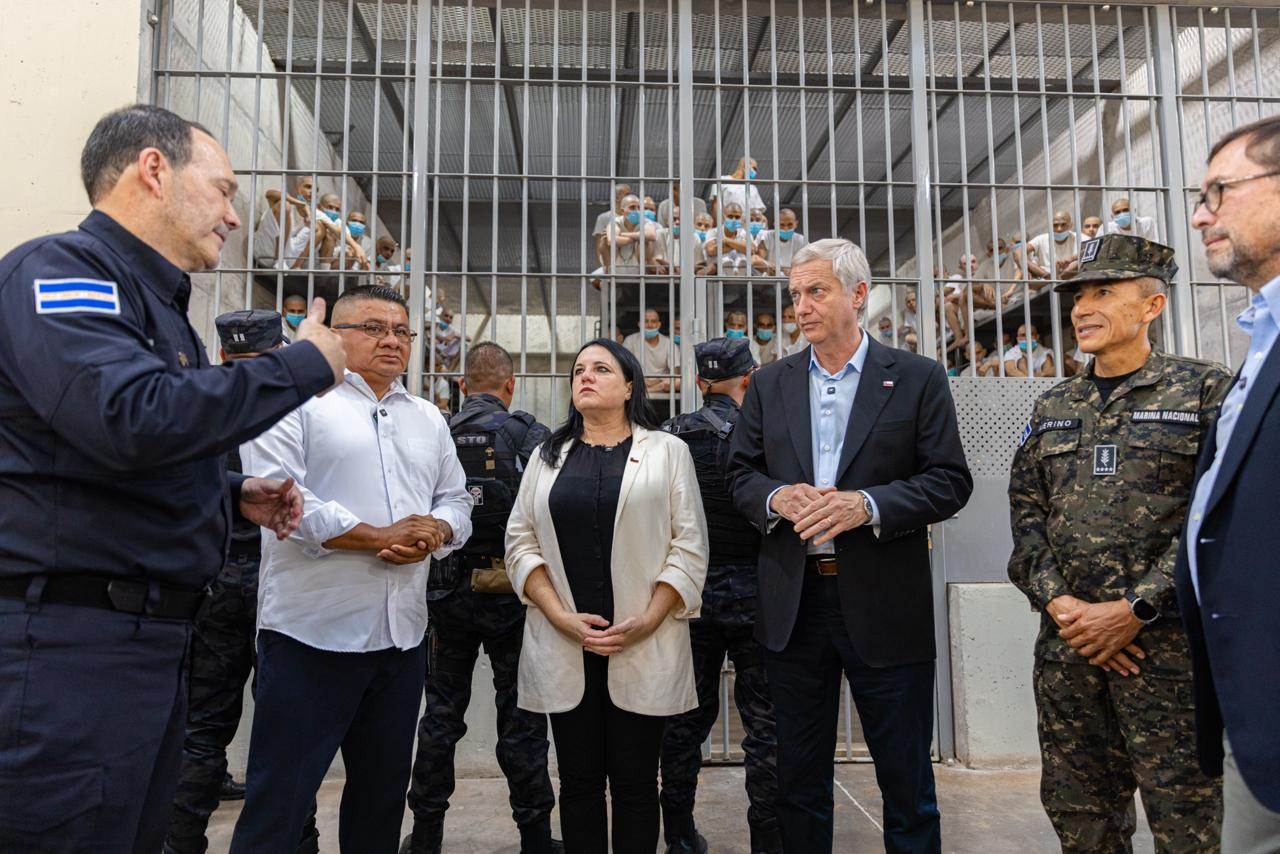
Then Chilean president-elect José Antonio Kast touring CECOT in 2026

On 1 June 2023, Bukele announced that he would build a prison similar to CECOT for white-collar criminals as a part of a "war against corruption". Bukele stated that the prison would be known as the Corruption Confinement Center (CECOC; Spanish: Centro de Confinamiento de la Corrupción) and that it would also be located in the San Vicente Department.

Politicians across Latin America in countries such as Chile, Colombia, Costa Rica, Guatemala, Honduras, Ecuador, and Peru have implemented or have called for security policies similar to those Bukele has implemented. Before the 2023 Guatemalan presidential election, National Unity of Hope candidate Sandra Torres stated that she would build two mega-prisons to "end the scourge of homicides, murders and extortions in our country", while Valor candidate Zury Ríos promised to set up at least three new prisons, stating that she "admire[s] the public security policies [Bukele] has done".

In January 2024, Ecuadorian president Daniel Noboa announced that he would build two prisons with a capacity for 12,000 inmates each and that they would be modeled on CECOT. One of these prisons, El Encuentro, opened in November 2025. In June 2024, Honduran president Xiomara Castro announced that she would build a prison capable of holding 20,000 inmates modeled on CECOT. In October 2025, Guatemalan president Bernardo Arévalo announced the construction of a prison modeled on CECOT with a capacity of 2,000 inmates. Costa Rica's High-Containment Center for Organized Crime (CACCO) opened in October 2026. In November 2026, Haiti signed an agreement for El Salvador to provide assistance in building three prisons in the country, following Haitian justice minister Patrick Pélissier's visit to CECOT.

Several presidents and president-elects have toured CECOT, including Chile's José Antonio Kast, Colombia's Abelardo de la Espriella, Costa Rica's Rodrigo Chaves Robles and Laura Fernández, and Peru's Keiko Fujimori. Justice and security ministers have also toured the prison, including Costa Rica's Gerald Campos Valverde and Haiti's Patrick Pélissier.

== See also ==
- Crime in El Salvador
