= Salvadoran gang crackdown =

Ongoing large-scale arrests of alleged gang members

- State of Exception / War Against the Gangs; Part of the Territorial Control Plan and the war on drugs
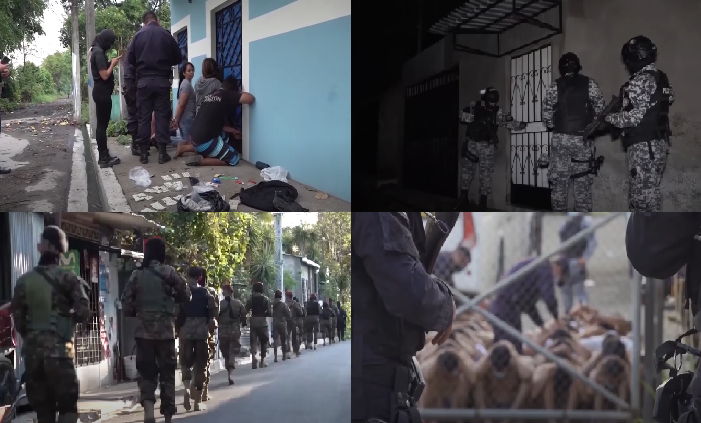
- Clockwise from top left: the detention of suspected gang members by the police, a police search of a house, imprisoned gang members, soldiers on patrol in the streets
- Date: 27 March 2022 – present; (4 years, 7 months, 2 weeks and 3 days)
- Location: El Salvador
- Status: Ongoing

Parties
Criminal gangs; Mara Salvatrucha; 18th Street gang; Other gangs	Salvadoran government; Armed Forces of El Salvador; National Civil Police

Lead figures
Non-centralized leadership	Nayib Bukele; Ernesto Castro; René Merino Monroy; Mauricio Arriaza; Gustavo Villatoro; Rodolfo Delgado; Osiris Luna Meza

Number
120,000+ gang members (August 2023 estimate)	20,000+ soldiers; 25,000+ police officers; (2023 estimate)

Casualties
- Deaths: In prison: ~500 (as of March 2026); Confronting police: 115 (as of October 2024)
- Arrested: 93,334 (as of 21 October 2026); 10,561 convicted (as of 16 October 2026); 8,000+ released (as of November 2024)

A government crackdown on gangs in El Salvador began on 27 March 2022 in response to a series of homicides committed by criminal gangs between 25 and 27 March 2022 that killed 87 people. After the killings, the Salvadoran government under President Nayib Bukele declared a state of emergency that suspended several constitutional rights and enabled the government to launch mass arrests of suspected gang members. The crackdown and state of emergency has since been extended 56 times as of 21 October 2026. In El Salvador, the crackdown has been called the "State of Exception" (Spanish: régimen de excepción) or the "War Against the Gangs" (guerra contra las pandillas).

The State of Exception allowed authorities to make arrests without a warrant and gave the government access to citizens' communication. As of 21 October 2026, over 93,334 people accused of having gang affiliations have been arrested, which has overcrowded El Salvador's prisons and has led the country to have the highest incarceration rate in the world by 2023. As of 16 May 2023, 5,000 people who were arrested have been released. Around two percent of El Salvador's adult population was incarcerated by early 2023. In January 2023, Minister of Defense René Merino Monroy announced that the government registered 496 homicides in 2022, a 56.8% decrease from 1,147 homicides in 2021. He attributed the decrease in homicides to the gang crackdown. That same month, the government opened the Terrorism Confinement Center (CECOT), a prison with a capacity for 40,000 prisoners.

Domestically, the crackdown has been popular among Salvadorans, who are weary of gang violence. Conversely, international human rights groups expressed concerns that the arrests were arbitrary and had little to do with gang violence, and several U.S. government representatives expressed concerns about the violence in the country and the methods used to combat it; these comments were criticized by Salvadoran president Nayib Bukele. Politicians across Latin America — in countries such as Chile, Colombia, Costa Rica, Ecuador, Guatemala, Honduras, and Peru — have implemented or have called for the implementation of security policies similar to those implemented by Bukele.

El Salvador's security policies under President Nayib Bukele have been credited with significantly reducing crime; however, efforts to replicate them in other countries have faced challenges. Analysts argue that the strategy's effectiveness in El Salvador was influenced by specific factors, including the country's geography, demographics, security force capabilities, incarceration rates, and political context. The application of similar measures in other nations has not yielded comparable results, as differing conditions may limit their effectiveness. Critics suggest that some governments adopting similar policies risk reinforcing ineffective heavy-handed security approaches that have historically struggled to address crime in a sustainable manner.

== Name ==
The gang crackdown is officially known in El Salvador as the "State of Exception" (Spanish: régimen de excepción). Salvadoran president Nayib Bukele and his government have described the crackdown itself as a "war" (guerra) and also refer to it as the "War Against the Gangs" (guerra contra las pandillas).

== Background ==
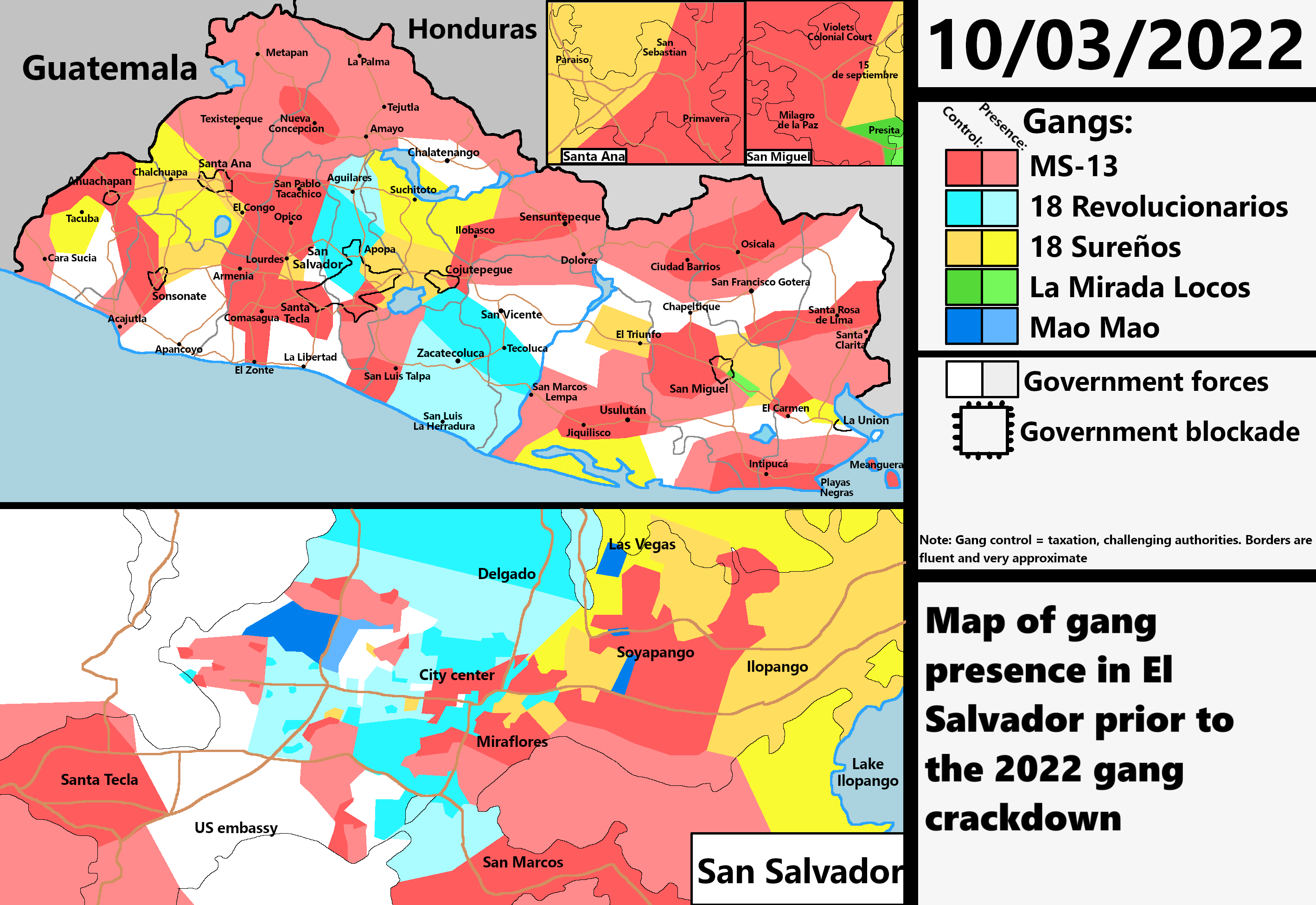
Map of gang presence in El Salvador before the 2022 crackdown

=== Crime in El Salvador ===
For decades, most crime in El Salvador was committed by the country's two largest criminal gangs (also known as maras): Mara Salvatrucha (more commonly known as MS-13) and 18th Street gang (Barrio 18). MS-13 was created in Los Angeles by refugees who fled El Salvador in the 1980s due to the civil war that was ongoing at the time; Barrio 18 (Note: Since 2004, Barrio 18 has been split into two rival cliques: Barrio 18 Revolucionarios and Barrio 18 Sureños.) was created by Mexican immigrants in the 1960s who were not accepted into other Hispanic gangs, and it accepted Hispanics of all nationalities unlike other gangs at the time. These gangs arrived in El Salvador in the 1990s after the United States began deporting refugees back to the country after the civil war's conclusion in 1992. Poverty, a lack of economic opportunities, high urbanization rates, and a lack of government counter-gang measures led to many young Salvadorans joining gangs, while others were forced to join the gangs under threat of violence.

MS-13 and Barrio 18 engage in several types of crime such as murder, rape, kidnapping, arms trafficking, drug trafficking, intimidation, robbery, vehicular theft, and extortion. Both gangs divided El Salvador into territories, and by 2016, they had a presence in 247 of El Salvador's 262 municipalities. The gangs charged extortion fees to people trying to enter or leave their controlled territories. Businesses were also forced to pay these extortion fees. The gangs intimidated people to not report crimes to the police with the unwritten rule of "see, hear, and be quiet" ("ver, oír y callar") under threat of violence, often through murdering or raping relatives. Gang violence contributed to El Salvador having one of the highest homicide rates in the world for decades; in 2015, El Salvador's homicide rate reached 103 homicides per 100,000 people — of 6,650 homicides registered that year — making it the most violent country in the Western Hemisphere. That year, the Supreme Court of Justice designated both MS-13 and Barrio 18 as terrorist organizations.

In 2004, there were between 10,000 and 39,000 gang members in El Salvador; in 2012, there were around 60,000 gang members. According to the Salvadoran government, there were around 80,000 gang members by April 2022. According to the Police Information System (SIP), a database utilized by the National Civil Police (PNC) to monitor gang activity, there were an estimated 120,000 gang members in El Salvador by August 2023. The SIP divides gang members into three categories: "homeboys" (full members), "chequeos" (aspiring members), and collaborators, with most members being homeboys or collaborators.

=== Anti-gang policies ===
In June 2019, newly inaugurated President Nayib Bukele made combatting gang violence a priority for his administration, and announced his "Territorial Control Plan" which sought to crack down on gang violence and improve security within the country. Actions taken by the country's security forces included the increase of military and police presence in specific municipalities where gang influence was significant, instituting lockdowns in prisons by confining prisoners to their cells and severing cell phone service in prisons, and improving the equipment and technology used by the National Civil Police (PNC) and the Salvadoran Army.

In 2021, the homicide rate reached the lowest it has been since the Salvadoran Civil War ended in 1992, with 18 homicides per 100,000 people. Bukele attributed this decline to his policies, and it has been one of his most-touted accomplishments. Bukele enjoys an extremely high approval rating of approximately 85%, one of the highest in the world. In December 2021, the United States government accused Bukele of negotiating a secret agreement with the gangs, reducing violence in return for financial and prison benefits. Additionally, the United States Department of the Treasury sanctioned two Salvadoran officials it claimed conducted the talks. Bukele called the accusations of making a deal a "lie" and denounced previous administrations who made similar deals.

Between 24 and 27 April 2020, a total of 77 people were murdered in El Salvador. Bukele's government says that the spike in murders was organized by gang members within El Salvador's prisons, leading to him instituting lockdowns across the country's prisons. Prisoners were confined in their cells 24 hours per day and rival gang members were mixed together in cells. His government published photographs of inmates being rounded up on the prison floor in cramped conditions. Human Rights Watch (HRW) criticized the government's actions as a violation of human rights and that it gave no consideration to the COVID-19 pandemic.

=== March 2022 homicide spike ===
From 25 to 27 March 2022, 87 people were murdered in El Salvador, including 62 people on Saturday alone, the highest single-day tally in decades; by contrast, 79 people were murdered throughout the entire month of February. The victims were targeted randomly. The government blamed the violence on Mara Salvatrucha (MS-13). William Eulises Soriano Herrera, a member of Bukele's Nuevas Ideas party, suggested the spike in violence was retaliation for the government's seizing control of two bus routes in the capital, which gangs often extort for revenue; according to José Miguel Cruz, a research director at Florida International University, the gangs may have been sending a message to the government to try to obtain better terms.

== Government crackdown ==
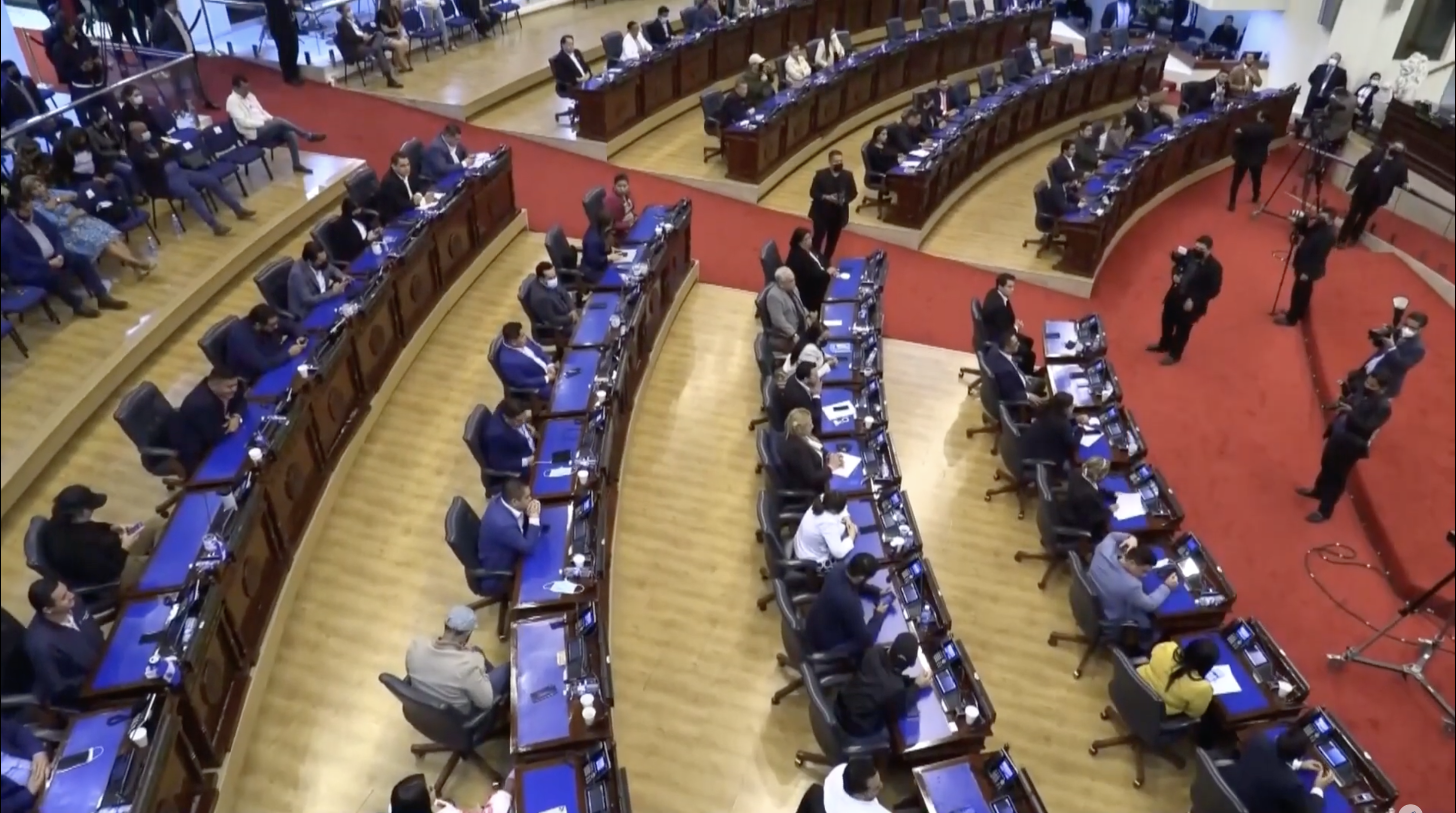
The Legislative Assembly voting to implement the state of exception

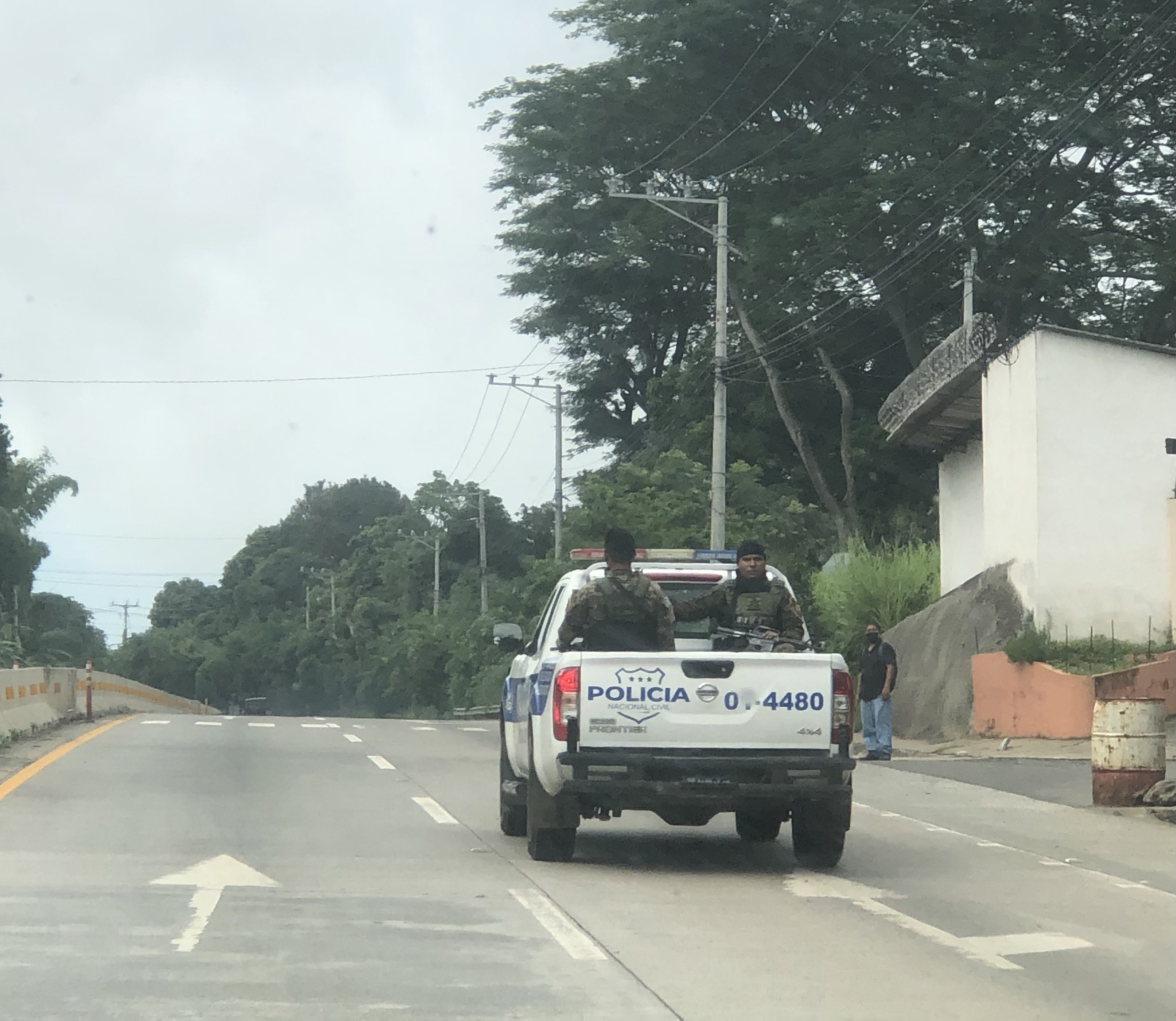
A police patrol in Zaragoza during the crackdown

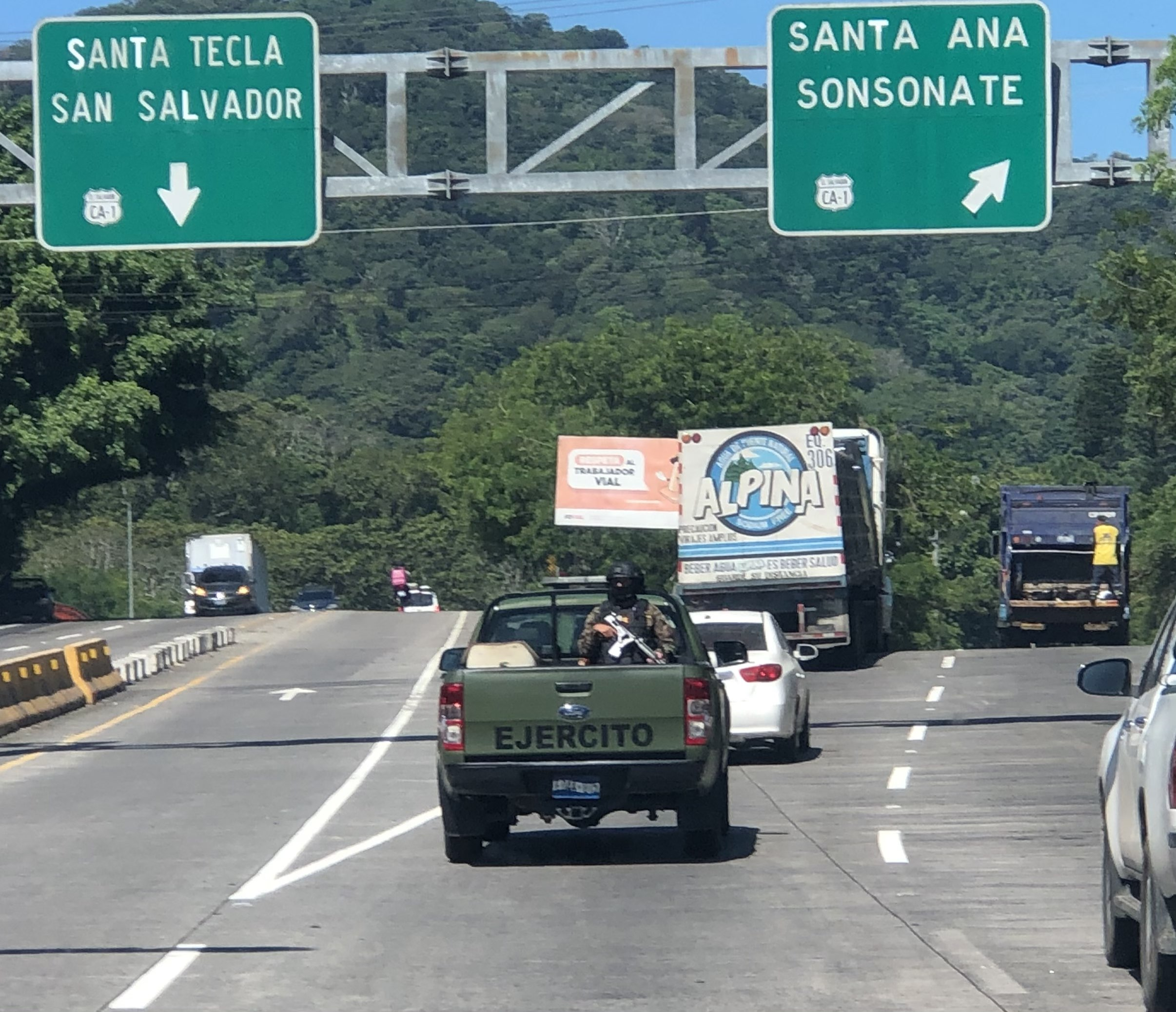
An army patrol in Santa Tecla during the crackdown

During an extraordinary session early on 27 March 2022, the Legislative Assembly approved a "state of exception". The order, which was initially set to last thirty days but has been extended 56 times as of 21 October 2026, suspended the rights of association and legal counsel, increased the amount of time that persons may be detained without being charged from three days to fifteen, and permitted the government to monitor citizens' communications without warrants. However, Salvadoran law enforcement was accused of violating even the expanded limits of their powers. The government also restricted the ability of judges to offer prisoners alternatives to pre-trial detention, like bail and house arrest.

Members of Nuevas Ideas passed new rules that increase prison sentences for convicted gang lords to 40 to 45 years (previously 6 to 9) and 20 to 30 years for other members (previously 3 to 5) and reduce the age of criminal responsibility, previously 16 years old, to 12. They also passed a law that threatens anyone who reproduces or disseminates messages from gangs, including news media, with 10 to 15 years in prison.

The government deployed additional police and military forces, raiding houses and creating checkpoints surrounding neighborhoods with known gang presences. Soldiers checked everyone for identification cards and proof of address, searched their vehicles and backpacks, and refused to let anyone enter or leave without what they considered a legitimate reason. Anyone considered suspicious was forced to strip so soldiers could check for gang-related tattoos.

By the end of 27 March, Salvadoran security forces claimed to have detained 576 people; within a week, almost 6,000 people had been arrested, straining El Salvador's already-overcrowded prisons. Nevertheless, the government pressured the police, military, and judicial system to continue the mass arrests by setting arrest quotas. After one month, more than 17,000 people had been arrested; on 25 May, the National Civil Police announced that more than 34,500 people had been arrested since the start of the state of emergency. Many people were unable to learn where or why relatives were detained. Rations for prisoners were reduced to two meals each day consisting of only beans and tortillas; Bukele explained that he would "not take budget away from schools to feed these terrorists". Prisoners have also been denied mattresses and frog marched, and Bukele ordered that all gang members be confined to their cells 24/7.

In July 2022, Bukele announced the construction of a new prison which will be able to house 40,000 prisoners, making it one of the largest prisons in the world. The prison, known as the Terrorism Confinement Center and located in Tecoluca, opened on 31 January 2023.

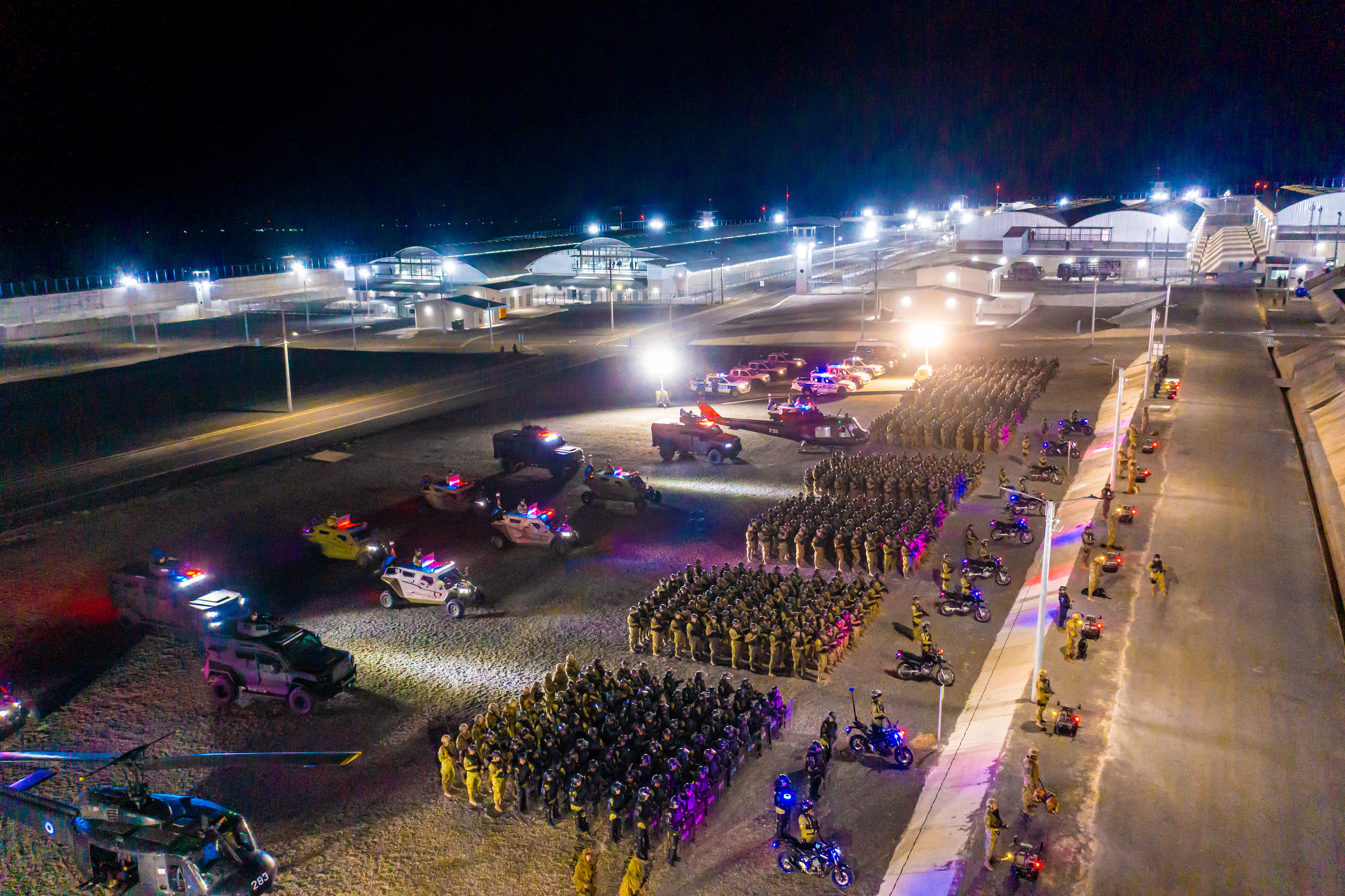
Military and police staff of the Terrorism Confinement Center

On 3 November 2022, Osiris Luna Meza, the minister of justice, announced that the government would begin destroying gravestones belonging to members of gangs to prevent them from becoming "shrines", stating "terrorists will no longer be able to 'glorify' the memory of dead criminals". Despite the destruction of the gravestones, the government stated that the bodies would remain intact and not be disturbed. Bukele compared the removal of the tombstones of gang members to denazification in Allied-occupied Germany and also compared the gangs to the Nazis themselves. He also stated that the government policy is only aimed at gravestones that mention gang affiliation.

The government initiated a siege of the city of Soyapango on 3 December 2022 when 10,000 soldiers were sent to surround the city and arrest gang members. The government erased gang graffiti from the city during the siege.

As of 21 October 2026, the state of exception has been extended 56 times by the Legislative Assembly. Nuevas Ideas (NI), the Grand Alliance for National Unity (GANA), the Christian Democratic Party (PDC), the National Coalition Party (PCN), and three independent politicians consistently vote for the extensions, while the Nationalist Republican Alliance (ARENA), the Farabundo Martí National Liberation Front (FMLN), Nuestro Tiempo (NT), and Vamos (V) consistently vote against it or abstain. In March 2026, the Legislative Assembly approved a constitutional amendment to allow the imposition of life imprisonment upon individuals convicted on murder, rape, or terrorism.

== Reactions ==
=== Domestic response ===
Domestically, the crackdown is popular. An April 2022 Gallup poll found that 91% of Salvadorans supported the government's actions, including 78% who "very much" supported them. Many Salvadorans explained that they were weary of violence, and many Salvadorans living in the United States supported the crackdown. Archbishop of San Salvador José Luis Escobar Alas voiced his open support for the crackdown in July 2022.

In general, the people living in El Salvador consider the atmosphere in the neighborhoods to be much safer, with citizens and observers saying they feel far more free to do what would have been previously considered unthinkable, with journalist Ioan Grillo writing "I have interviewed dozens of gang members in visits over the years; you could often find them openly hanging out in the centre of neighbourhoods. But since the state of emergency, their presence has been greatly reduced: Maras are largely in prison, have fled, or are underground". Similarly, Mary Speck has observed that the criminal gangs have "largely disappeared" from San Salvador because of which vendors, shop owners, drivers and pedestrians no longer have to pay gang members and that residents of a particular block dominated by a gang "no longer fear violent reprisals if they cross into another gang’s territory". However, the incidents of innocent people getting caught up in the crackdown have remained a significant concern about the war against the gangs, with the families of some of those arrested in the crackdown saying that their family members were arrested on the basis of poor evidence and an advocacy group for such people called "Victims of the Regime Movement" being founded.

=== United States response ===
The United States Institute of Peace observed that while the control asserted by the gangs in El Salvador had indeed been greatly diminished, if not destroyed, the government would still need to formulate a plan for transitioning out of the state of exception and figure out what to do with those arrested. It also mentioned the need for the government to step in and use the newly regained control over the gangs to prevent more people from becoming gang members and replacing the present gang members who have been sent to jail. Veronica Reyna, a researcher from El Salvador, was quoted as saying, “The gangs exercised control because no one else would. If the state doesn’t fill this vacuum, not just with police but education and other services, other criminal groups will step in." The state of exception is expected to continue until the March 2024 general elections, after which anti-crime measures addressing causes like education and underdevelopment are expected. An unnamed security expert was quoted as saying, “They know they can’t simply fill up the jails. After the elections, they can start looking at rehabilitation and community engagement."

So far, the government has promised to deal with these issues with initiatives such as Mi Nueva Escuela (My New School), which aims to improve the educational situation through curriculum reform, teacher training, arrangement of quality didactic, technological, health, and nutritional facilities, as well as the remodeling of more than 5,000 schools over the next five years. Additionally, CUBOs (Urban Centers) aims to provide impoverished youths with safe spaces and has already been launched. One thousand schools are expected to be rebuilt by September 2023 under Mi Nueva Escuela, while 11 transparent, cube-shaped urban centers in poor communities, offering young people academic support, athletic activities, and art or language classes with access to computers, a library with cozy cushions for reading, and adult supervision have already been built as of May 2023. While these initiatives have been appreciated, activists feel that more work is required as children in some areas still lack access to schools.

Conservatives, including those belonging to U.S. Republican Party circles have also talked about the crackdown in a positive manner.

In a tweet on 10 April 2022, U.S. Secretary of State Antony Blinken "condemn[ed]" the increase in gang violence in El Salvador and "urge[d]" the government to respect due process and civil liberties. The same day, State Department spokesman Ned Price tweeted affirming that the United States "continues to support El Salvador" against gangs while urging it to protect its citizens and their civil liberties. The next day, Bukele responded that United States' support against Salvadoran gangs had come under the Trump administration, citing the withdrawal of American aid from the National Civil Police and Institute for Access to Public Information four months into the Biden administration, and saying that the United States now only supported the civil liberties of gangs.

=== Latin American response ===
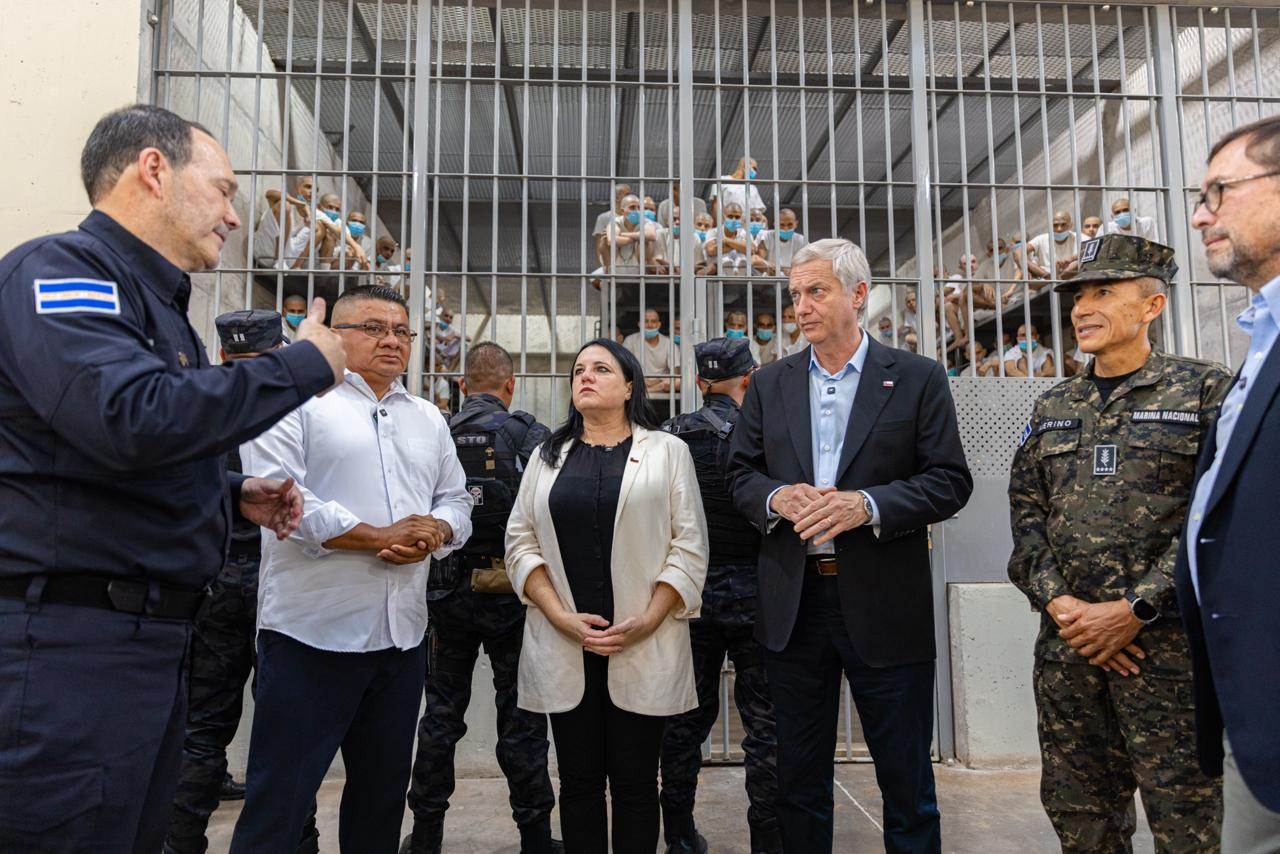
Then Chilean president-elect José Antonio Kast touring CECOT in 2026

In Latin America, the crackdown has attracted the attention of leaders and people from many countries with prominent Guatemalan presidential candidates Zury Ríos and Sandra Torres, Honduran Security Minister Ramón Sibbilón, and Costa Rican security minister Jorge Torres applauding it. In Peru, the Mayor of Lima and right-wing presidential hopeful Rafael López Aliaga has praised the policies and called on the Peruvian Defense Ministry to allow the Peruvian Armed Forces to patrol the streets of Lima, including with tanks while Rodolfo Hernández Suárez, who narrowly lost the 2022 Colombian presidential election had promised similar policies. Honduras, under the leadership of left wing president Xiomara Castro, has also launched its own, smaller crackdown, the Honduran gang crackdown. Honduras later temporarily intensified its crackdown in June 2023 with a prison sweep after a gang massacre inside a prison. Former Mexican president Andrés Manuel López Obrador and Ecuadorian President Guillermo Lasso have also expressed their views about the crackdown. 2023 Ecuadorian general election candidate Jan Topić has also styled himself as a Bukele-like political figure in his campaign aiming to fight crime with a hard hand, earning him the nickname "Ecuadorian Bukele". Although the other Ecuadorian candidates have also talked about dealing with crime with ruthless measures as a key priority, he and former Vice President Otto Sonnenholzner are the only candidates who have tried to imitate Bukele's image to varying degrees. Ecuador has seen a major increase in organized crime in the past two years. Daniel Quintero, the mayor of Medellín in Colombia, has also announced that he would be opening a prison in a similar style to the megaprisons run in El Salvador. Other Colombian politicians have also demanded similar security policies. On the other hand, Colombian President Gustavo Petro criticized the crackdown, drawing rebuke from Bukele. The crackdown has been extremely popular in neighboring Honduras and Guatemala, where some groups have even organized parades demanding similar policies. It has also been a point of debate and curiosity in Mexico and Chile. In addition it has been supported in Ecuador, where a recent poll has showed that more than half of the population would support similar strategies and Colombia, where the right wing has been demanding similar crackdowns. Argentinian Security Minister Patricia Bullrich has expressed interest in using the "Bukele model" to tackle crime in Argentina, following an offer to cooperate from Bukele.

=== Allegations of human rights abuses ===
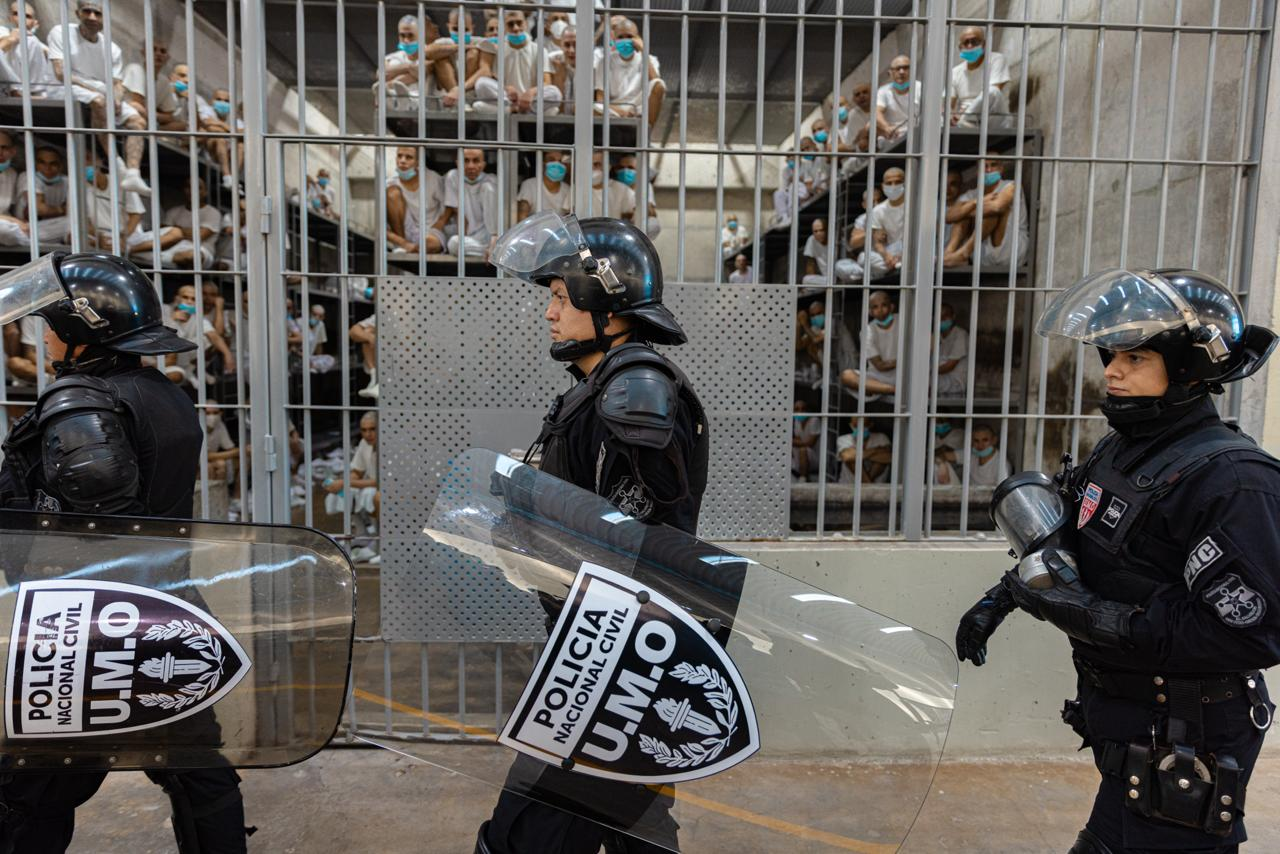
The CECOT prison in El Salvador, constructed in late 2022

Human rights advocates have criticized the arrests as often arbitrary, based on a person's appearance or residence, and expressed concern that innocent people are being caught in the sweeps. Bukele expressed hope that only 1% of arrests would be incorrect, and Salvadoran Defense Minister René Merino Monroy stated that arrested persons found to have no links to gangs would be freed, saying that "the people need to know that if they're not involved in anything bad, nothing bad will happen to them." Human Rights Watch criticized the government's policy as "first arrest, then tweet, and investigate later", referencing Salvadoran police's tweets depicting people's arrests. Human rights groups have also expressed concern that the arrests have little to do with gang violence, suggesting Bukele will use them to consolidate power and target critics.

Central American human rights advocacy and research group Cristosal reported 261 fatalities, abuse, denial of medical care, and torture in Salvadoran prisons in 2024 in connection with the gang crackdown. In May 2025, Cristosal lawyer Ruth López was arrested and remains in detention as of June 2026. By July 2025, Cristosal was reporting 427 deaths in Salvadoran prisons. The organization had to evacuate its staff from El Salvador amid increasing threats of repression by the government.

== See also ==
- List of ongoing armed conflicts
- List of wars involving El Salvador
- Gang war in Haiti
