= Tecoluca =

- Municipality
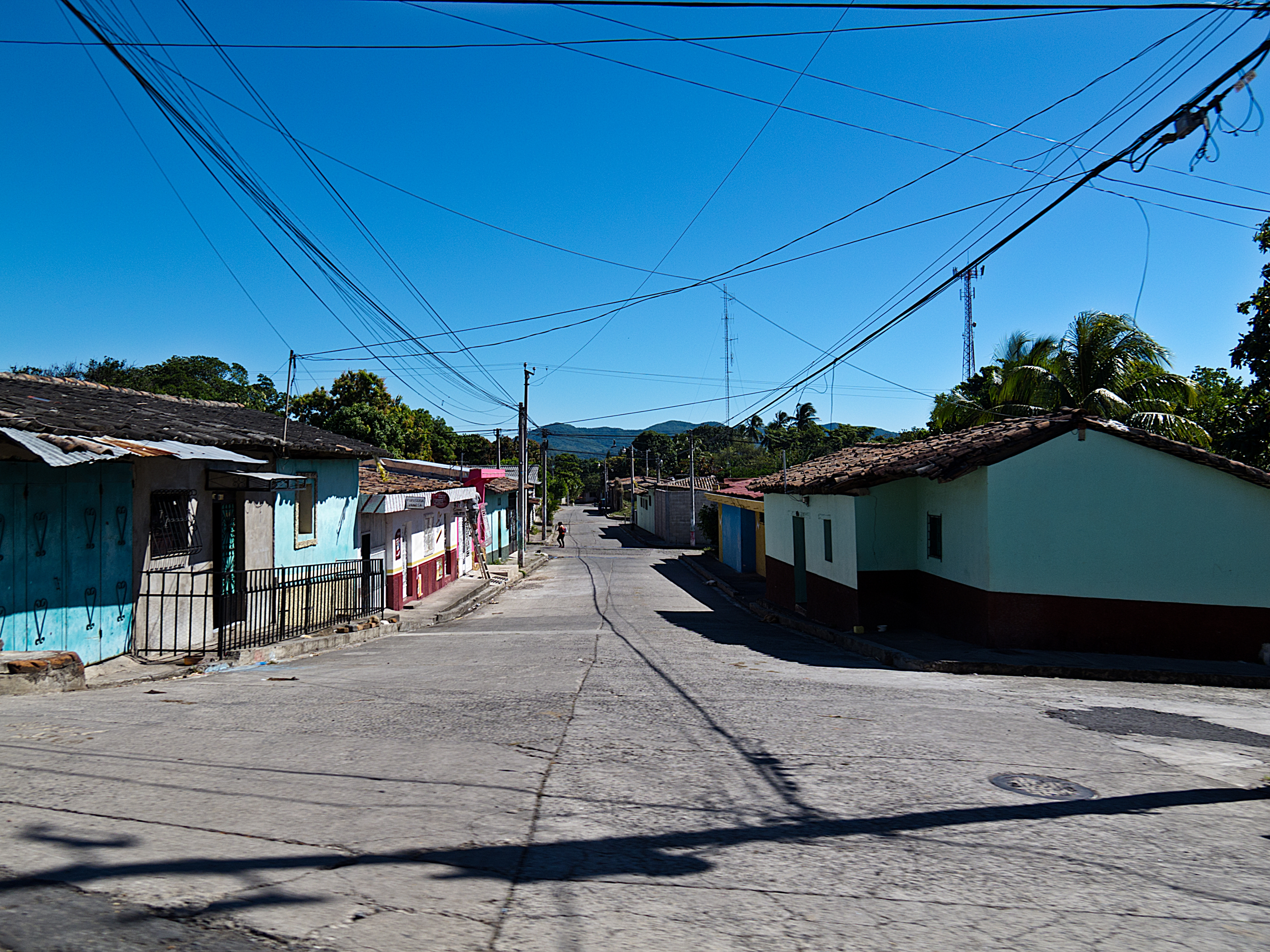
- Tecoluca in 2011

- Location in El Salvador
- Coordinates: 13°32′N 88°47′W
- Country: El Salvador
- Department: San Vicente Department

Area
  - Total: 110.5 sq mi (286.2 km^{2})
- Elevation: 750 ft (230 m)

Population (2024)
  - Total: 26,656

Tecoluca is a municipality in the San Vicente department of El Salvador. The Terrorism Confinement Center, also known as CECOT, is a maximum security prison located in Tecoluca.
