= Cabinet of Salvador Sánchez Cerén =

Former presidential cabinet of El Salvador

- 80th Cabinet of El Salvador
- 2014–2019
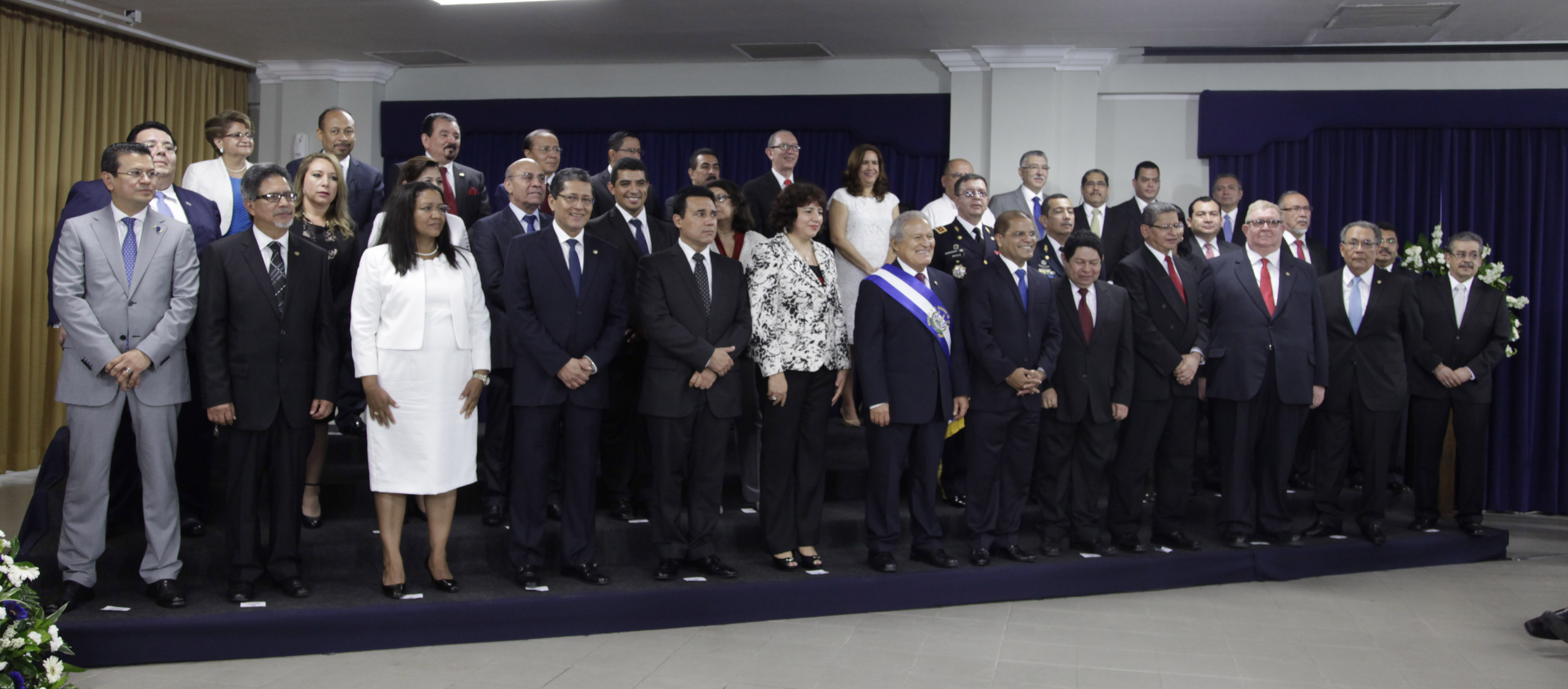
- The cabinet on 1 June 2014
- Date formed: 1 June 2014
- Date dissolved: 1 June 2019

People and organisations
- President: Salvador Sánchez Cerén
- No. of ministers: 12
- Ministers removed: 3
- Total no. of members: 15
- Member party: FMLN
- Status in legislature: Opposition

History
- Election: 2014 presidential election
- Outgoing election: 2019 presidential election
- Legislature terms: X Legislative Assembly; XI Legislative Assembly; XII Legislative Assembly
- Predecessor: Mauricio Funes
- Successor: Nayib Bukele

The cabinet of Salvador Sánchez Cerén formed on 1 June 2014 to serve as President Salvador Sánchez Cerén's cabinet from 1 June 2014 until 1 June 2019.

== Ministers ==
Office	Name	Portrait	Party	Took office	Left office	^{Refs.}
Minister of Foreign Affairs	Hugo Roger Martínez Bonilla		FMLN	1 June 2014	28 May 2018	
Minister of Foreign Affairs	Carlos Alfredo Castaneda Magaña		FMLN	1 June 2018	1 June 2019	
Minister of the Government and Territorial Development	Ramón Arístides Valencia Arana		FMLN	1 June 2014	1 June 2019	
Minister of Justice and Public Security	Benito Antonio Lara Fernández		FMLN	1 June 2014	1 June 2019	
Minister of the Economy	Tharsis Salomón López Guzmán		FMLN	1 June 2014	20 March 2018	
Minister of the Economy	Luz Estrella Rodríguez		FMLN	20 March 2018	1 June 2019	
Minister of Education	Carlos Mauricio Canjura Linares		FMLN	1 June 2014	1 June 2019	
Minister of National Defense	David Victoriano Munguía Payés		Military	1 June 2014	1 June 2019	
Minister of Labor and Social Welfare	Sandra Edibel Guevara Pérez		FMLN	1 June 2014	1 June 2019	
Minister of Agriculture and Livestock	Orestes Fredesman Ortez Andrade		FMLN	1 June 2014	1 June 2019	
Minister of Health	Elvia Violeta Menjívar Escalante		FMLN	1 June 2014	1 June 2019	
Minister of Tourism	José Napoleón Duarte Durán		FMLN	1 June 2014	1 June 2019	
Minister of Finance	Carlos Cáceres Chávez		FMLN	1 June 2014	20 March 2018	
Minister of Finance	Nelson Eduardo Fuentes Menjívar		FMLN	20 March 2018	1 June 2019	
Minister of Public Works and Urban Development	Gerson Martínez		FMLN	1 June 2014	1 June 2019	

== See also ==
- Salvador Sánchez Cerén
