= Cabinet of Mauricio Funes =

Former presidential cabinet of El Salvador

- 79th Cabinet of El Salvador
- 2009–2014
- Date formed: 1 June 2009
- Date dissolved: 1 June 2014

People and organisations
- President: Mauricio Funes
- No. of ministers: 13
- Total no. of members: 24
- Member party: FMLN
- Status in legislature: Opposition

History
- Election: 2009 presidential election
- Outgoing election: 2014 presidential election
- Legislature terms: IX Legislative Assembly; X Legislative Assembly
- Predecessor: Antonio Saca
- Successor: Salvador Sánchez Cerén

The cabinet of Mauricio Funes formed on 1 June 2009 to serve as President Mauricio Funes' cabinet from 1 June 2009 until 1 June 2014.

== Ministers ==
The following is a list of Mauricio Funes' cabinet ministers.

Office	Name	Portrait	Party	Took office	Left office
Minister of Government	Humberto Centeno Najarro		FMLN	1 June 2009	31 May 2011
Minister of Government	Gregorio Ernesto Zelayandía Cisneros		FMLN	31 May 2011	1 June 2014
Minister of Foreign Affairs	Hugo Roger Martínez Bonilla		FMLN	1 June 2009	14 August 2013
Minister of Foreign Affairs	Jaime Alfredo Miranda Flamenco		FMLN	14 August 2013	1 June 2014
Minister of Justice and Public Security	José Manuel Melgar Henríquez		FMLN	1 June 2009	22 November 2011
Minister of Justice and Public Security	David Victoriano Munguía Payés		Military	22 November 2011	28 May 2013
Minister of Justice and Public Security	José Ricardo Perdomo Aguilar		FMLN	28 May 2013	1 June 2014
Minister of Finance	Carlos Cáceres Chávez		FMLN	1 June 2009	1 June 2014
Minister of the Economy	Héctor Dada Hirezi		FMLN	1 June 2009	27 April 2012
Minister of the Economy	José Armando Flores Alemán		FMLN	27 April 2012	1 June 2014
Minister of Education	Salvador Sánchez Cerén		FMLN	1 June 2009	3 June 2012
Minister of Education	Franzi Hato Hasbún Barake		FMLN	3 June 2012	1 June 2014
Minister of National Defense	David Victoriano Munguía Payés		Military	1 June 2009	22 November 2011
Minister of National Defense	José Atilio Benítez Parada		Military	22 November 2011	12 July 2013
Minister of National Defense	David Victoriano Munguía Payés		Military	12 July 2013	1 June 2014
Minister of Labor and Social Welfare	Victoria Marina Velásquez de Avilés		FMLN	1 June 2009	31 May 2011
Minister of Labor and Social Welfare	Humberto Centeno Najarro		FMLN	31 May 2011	1 June 2014
Minister of Agriculture and Livestock	Manuel Ramón Sevilla Avilés		FMLN	1 June 2009	31 May 2010
Minister of Agriculture and Livestock	José Guillermo Belarmino López Suárez		FMLN	31 May 2010	5 September 2012
Minister of Agriculture and Livestock	Pablo Alcides Ochoa Quinteros		FMLN	5 September 2012	1 June 2014
Minister of Health and Social Assistance	María Isabel Rodríguez de Sutter		FMLN	1 June 2009	1 June 2014
Minister of Public Works, Transportation, and Urban Development	Manuel Orlando Quinteros Aguilar		FMLN	1 June 2009	1 June 2014
Minister of the Environment and Natural Resources	Hermán Humberto Rosa Chávez		FMLN	1 June 2009	1 June 2014
Minister of Tourism	José Napoleón Duarte Durán		FMLN	1 June 2009	1 June 2014

== See also ==
- Mauricio Funes
