= Handal =

Handal (Arabic: حنضل, meaning "bitter colocynth") is a surname. Notable people with the surname include:

- Esteban Handal Perez (born 1965), Honduran politician
- Muna Handal-Dayeh (born 1957), Palestinian Arab-American businesswoman
- Nathalie Handal (born 1969), French-American poet and writer
- Nils Handal (1906–1992), Norwegian politician
- Schafik Hándal (1930–2006), Salvadoran politician
- William Handal Raudales (born 1945), Honduran politician
- William Jacobo Handal (1951–2017), Salvadoran politician
- Handal, an evil king in the epic Taghribat Bani Hilal

== See also ==
- Handala
- Hindal, a Sikh religious leader
