= March 2025 United States deportations of Venezuelans =

United States deportation of Venezuelans

External videos
- Video of the arrival of 238 alleged Tren de Aragua members posted by Salvadoran president Nayib Bukele on Twitter

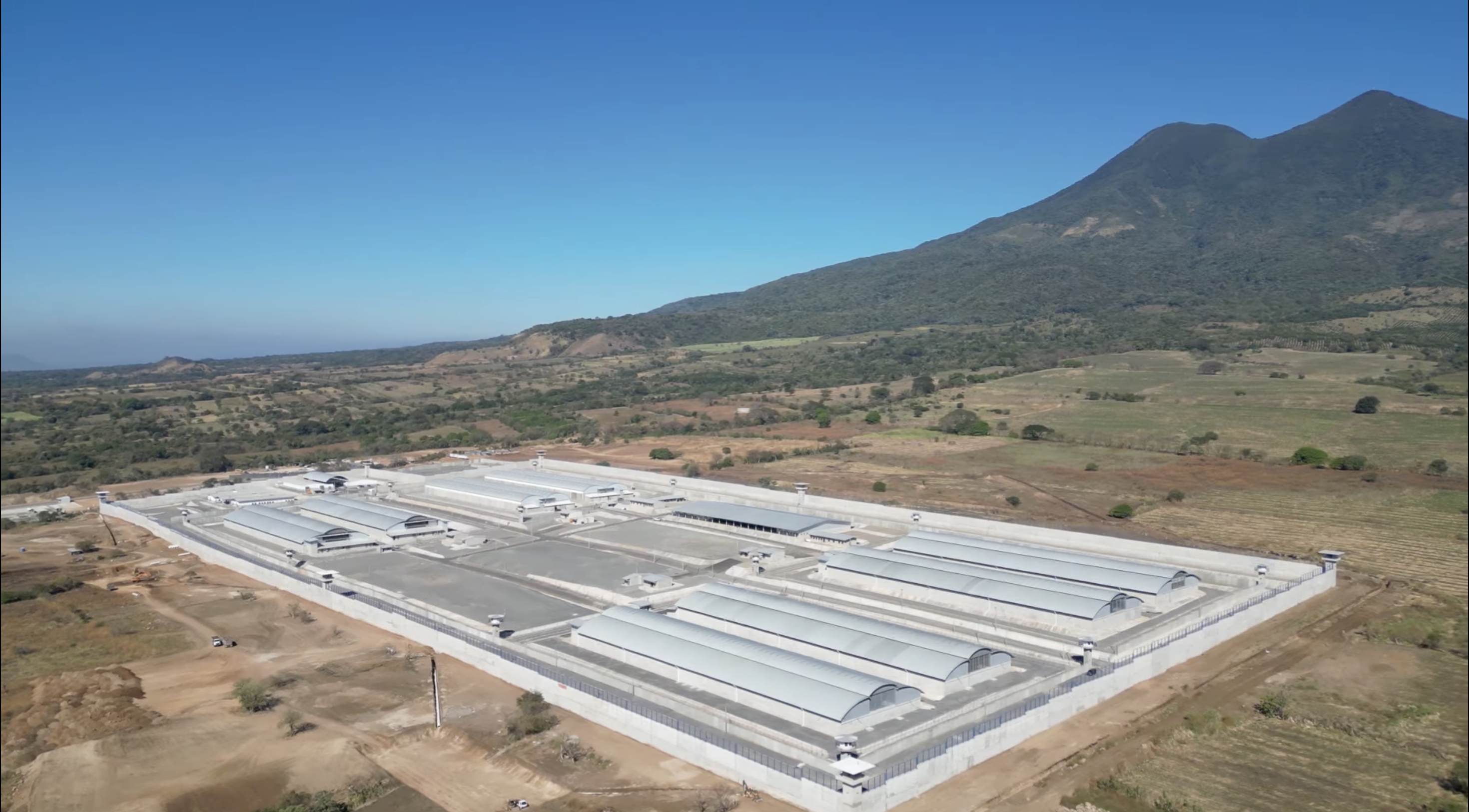
The Terrorism Confinement Center, where the 238 Venezuelans deported to El Salvador were detained

In March 2025, 261 people were deported by the second Trump administration from the United States to El Salvador, to be immediately and indefinitely imprisoned without trial. Of these 261 people, 137 Venezuelans were deported under the Alien Enemies Act which was invoked by US President Donald Trump on March 14. Removal of anyone (from the United States) under the Alien Enemies Act was blocked the next day by a US judge, in J.G.G. v. Trump, while the flights were en route. The flights proceeded, potentially in contempt of court. 101 other Venezuelans were deported under regular US immigration law and 21 Salvadorans, accused by the Trump administration of being connected to MS-13, including Kilmar Abrego Garcia, were flown to El Salvador. Additionally, of the 261, the US deported 2 other Salvadorans, described as "special cases". Later in March, the US deported 17 more people (separate from the 261) with Salvadoran and Venezuelan nationality to El Salvador.

They were detained at the Terrorism Confinement Center (CECOT), a prison with a history of human rights abuses, as part of the agreement to hold deportees (from the US) there in exchange for money (about US$6 million) and the return of US informants on alleged deals between MS-13 and the Nayib Bukele government.

In July 2025, 252 Venezuelans were sent from El Salvador to Venezuela in exchange for 10 Americans being sent from Venezuela to the US. Eight women and a Nicaraguan man returned to the United States from El Salvador in March. Kilmar Abrego Garcia returned to the United States from El Salvador in June.

== Background ==
=== Tren de Aragua ===
In the United States, President Donald Trump incorporated the Tren de Aragua into his political discourse by comparing it to terrorist organizations such as al-Qaeda, using its alleged presence as justification to tighten immigration policies, including invoking the Alien Enemies Act of 1798, a wartime law historically applied in contexts of armed conflict. This legislation enabled the deportation of Venezuelans without due legal process, under the argument that they posed a terrorist threat, ever U.S. intelligence reports ruling out that the group operated under Venezuelan state control or possessed a coordinated structure within the country. Simultaneously, Nicolás Maduro's government has been accused of replicating tactics similar to those employed by Fidel Castro during the 1980 Mariel boatlift, when the Cuban regime allowed the mass departure of citizens, including a significant number of common prisoners and others deemed undesirable, as a form of pressure on the United States. In a comparable manner, the Venezuelan diaspora has been used as a conduit for the outflow of criminal elements, disguised among migrants fleeing the ongoing humanitarian crisis, thus enabling the expansion of networks like the Tren de Aragua in other countries.

The 2023 raid on the Tocorón Penitentiary Center, considered the group's headquarters, took place only after years of inaction despite repeated reports of crimes committed by the faction in neighboring nations. Experts such as Keymer Ávila have pointed out that both Trump's narrative and the Venezuelan government's omissions reflect political motivations, the U.S. constructs a useful enemy to justify punitive measures, in Venezuela, state repression and structural crisis have forced millions to migrate, many of whom are later stigmatized as criminals without evidence. This situation allows authoritarian or populist governments to divert public attention, bolster internal security agendas for propagandistic purposes, and justify the exclusion of vulnerable sectors under the guise of combating organized crime.

=== Alien Enemies Act ===
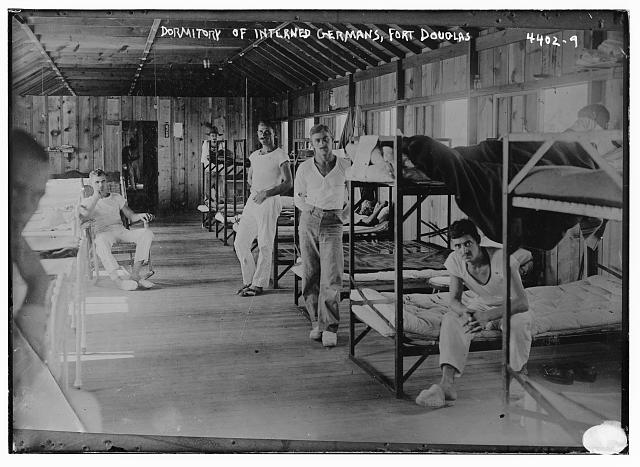
German-American internees at Fort Douglas during World War I

The Alien Enemies Act is one of the four Alien and Sedition Acts. Trump's invocation of the act was only its fourth use in history, and the first peacetime use of the otherwise wartime Act. It was previously used after Congressional declarations of war in the War of 1812, World War I and World War II. The Alien Enemies Act is most infamously known as the legal basis for the internment of German Americans during both world wars, and the internment of Italian Americans and, to a lesser extent, Japanese Americans during World War II.

=== Trump administration deportation policy ===
During his 2024 presidential campaign, Trump promised to deport foreign gang members in what would be called "Operation Aurora", named after Aurora, Colorado. Aurora and the surrounding Denver metropolitan area had seen the arrival of over 50,000 Venezuelan in the past 18 months during the Venezuelan refugee crisis, and local police attributed crimes such as kidnapping, shooting, and prostitution to members of the gang Tren de Aragua. Trump's campaign alleged that the gang had taken over Aurora and used it to justify its broad immigrations policies.

After Trump's presidential inauguration, he signed an executive order designating gangs such as Tren de Aragua and MS-13 as foreign terrorist organizations as part of his plan to target them using the Alien Enemies Act. Salvadoran president Nayib Bukele offered to help the Trump administration imprison criminals at CECOT, whether they be U.S. citizens or foreign nationals.

A United States Intelligence Community assessment from February 26, 2025, concluded with a moderate level of confidence that the Venezuelan government was not controlling Tren de Aragua, the gang was not acting on government orders and lacked the resources and organization to do so. The Federal Bureau of Investigation (FBI) dissented, maintaining the gang has a connection to Venezuelan president Nicolás Maduro's administration based on information the other agencies rejected. A more comprehensive National Intelligence Council assessment in March stated repeatedly that the Venezuelan government did not coordinate or support Tren de Aragua. It found minimal contact between some gang members and low-level members of the government, but had a consensus that there was no coordination or directive role between the government or the gang. Of the 18 organizations, the FBI again disagreed. Director of national intelligence Tulsi Gabbard blamed the report on malicious actors within the government, and subsequently fired the top two officials of the National Intelligence Council. The Washington Post described this as her latest effort to say she fights politicization of the intelligence community while doing the opposite.

=== Statements by the Secretary of Homeland Security ===
Homeland Security Secretary Kristi Noem stated that the migrants sent to the Terrorism Confinement Center (CECOT) should remain there "for the rest of their lives," highlighting collaboration with Bukele to expand the prison's capacity, which currently houses 14,000 inmates and has room for 40,000. Noem also visited CECOT and warned that illegal immigrants who commit crimes in the United States could end up in that prison; however, human rights organizations such as Cristosal have said that many of the deportees have no criminal records and were identified as gang members solely based on tattoos. Additionally, it was reported that the migrants are being held incommunicado, with no access to their families or lawyers, and that neither the U.S. nor Salvadoran governments have provided complete lists of the detainees or information about their current status. Cristosal also warned that these actions could constitute enforced disappearances and violations of international human rights law.

=== Low crime rates and high education among Venezuelan immigrants ===
Data from the United States Sentencing Commission for the 2023 fiscal year shows that Venezuelans are not among the groups with the highest number of criminal convictions, with the majority involving citizens from Mexico, Honduras, Guatemala, the Dominican Republic, and El Salvador. Venezuelan migration has grown significantly in recent decades due to the South American country's political and economic crisis, with the Venezuelan population in the United States increasing from 33,000 people in 1980 to 770,000 in 2023, although they still represent less than 2% of the nearly 48 million immigrants in the United States. Most Venezuelans migrated after 2010 and are primarily concentrated in Florida—particularly in Miami-Dade, Broward, and Orange counties—as well as in Harris County, Texas. This population is characterized by its youth—with an average age of 39—and high educational attainment: in 2023, 48% of Venezuelans aged 25 or older held a university degree or higher, surpassing both the U.S. average and that of other migrant communities. In labor terms, 75% of Venezuelans aged 16 and older were active in the workforce, although their earnings were below the general average. Regarding immigration status, around 486,000 Venezuelans were unauthorized to live legally in the country as of 2023, ranking fifth among the largest unauthorized migrant groups. By January 2025, 607,000 Venezuelans were protected under Temporary Protected Status (TPS), and another 117,000 had entered through humanitarian parole, with many holding dual statuses alongside pending asylum applications.

== Due process ==
The Fifth Amendment to the United States Constitution states that "no person" shall "be deprived of life, liberty, or property, without due process of law." Due process requires upholding the rights and legal protections set in law. Under U.S. immigration law, this includes opportunities to see a judge and request asylum, though CNN, citing immigration attorneys, noted that people in immigration court face a lower standard of due process in practice.

When the president takes on wartime power, the situation changes. Those subject to his declaration lose protections of immigration and criminal law, and are instead processed as alien enemies under America's wartime laws. They're eligible to be summarily arrested, detained, and deported without going through normal immigration proceedings, and cannot claim asylum. The Associated Press wrote Trump's invocation of the act "could allow him to deport any noncitizen he says is associated with the gang, without offering proof or even publicly identifying them." The process does not allow for a hearing, which NPR noted leaves no time to contest the government's claims that deportees are members of a criminal gang, and The Hill described as sparking fears it would lead to widespread deportations without connection to the gang.

Lee Gelernt, the ACLU's lead counsel on J.G.G. v. Trump, told NPR that "these individuals did not get a hearing to show they're not members of a gang," while CNN quoted Nayna Gupta, policy director of the American Immigration Council, as saying that "flimsy evidence paired with no meaningful opportunity to refute that evidence in any kind of proceeding before any kind of decision-maker" distinguished the case. Lindsay Toczylowski, lawyer with the Immigrant Defenders Law Center nonprofit, said the administration hadn't done the work to understand who they were sending to El Salvador. She pointed to her client, who applied for asylum, came under suspicion for his tattoos, and was sent to CECOT without his lawyers having a chance to counter the claims at a court hearing.

White House Border Czar Tom Homan, asked on ABC's This Week' about whether deportees who denied being members of the gang got a chance to prove it before being sent to a Salvadoran prison and if "they have any due process at all," replied: "Due process? What was Laken Riley's due process? What were all these young women that were killed and raped by members of TdA, what was their due process?" Laken Riley was a Georgia nursing student who was murdered by an illegal immigrant, named Jose Ibarra. Trump and conservative media routinely refer to her murderer as a member of Tren de Aragua. The police or prosecutors on her case have not.

== Timeline ==
On Friday, March 14, 2025, Trump signed presidential proclamation 10903, invoking the Alien Enemies Act, asserting that Tren de Aragua, a criminal organization from Venezuela, had invaded the United States, and directing the Department of Homeland Security and Department of Justice (DOJ) "apprehend, restrain, secure, and remove every Venezuelan migrant, 14 or older, deemed to be part of Tren de Aragua and lacking U.S. citizenship or permanent residency." The White House did not announce at the time that the proclamation has been signed. However, media were reporting that Trump was planning to invoke the Alien Enemies Act against Tren de Aragua, so that afternoon the American Civil Liberties Union (ACLU) started working on a class action lawsuit to prevent anyone's deportation until the case was heard in court, and they contacted immigration lawyers to identify possible plaintiffs, finding five Venezuelan men with cases before the immigration court, all of whom had been transferred to a Texas detention facility.

Very early on Saturday, March 15, the ACLU and Democracy Forward filed their class action suit in the District Court for the District of Columbia on behalf of the five men, using affidavits from their immigration attorneys because the men themselves could not be reached. They were still unaware that Trump had already signed the proclamation. The suit was assigned to judge James Boasberg. That morning, noting the exigent circumstances, he approved a temporary restraining order for the five plaintiffs, and he ordered a 5 p.m. hearing to determine whether he would certify the class in the class action. The government intended to starting deport men alleged to be Tren de Aragua members that same day and had started bringing Venezuelans to the airport that morning. All five of the plaintiffs were already at the airport, and four were aboard a plane, but were taken off the plane in light of Boasberg's order.

Other men continued to be transported to the airport. In the mid-afternoon, detainees were taken from El Valle detention center in Raymondville, Texas, to buses. Subsequently, the White House announced that Trump had invoked the Alien Enemies Act, posting a copy of the proclamation to its website. At 5 p.m., Boasberg began the court hearing to determine whether to certify the class and grant a temporary restraining order for the class. Boasberg asked deputy assistant attorney general Drew Ensign if the Trump administration was planning to carry out deportations using the Alien Enemies Act in the next 48 hours. Ensign replied that he did not know and requested time to find out. Boasberg gave Ensign around 40 minutes to find out, pausing the hearing at 5:22 p.m. Meanwhile, at Harlingen, Texas, two planes with Venezuelan deportees took off, one at 5:26 p.m. and the other at 5:44 p.m. Boasberg resumed the hearing around 5:55 p.m., with Ensign saying that he still had no specific information about the Trump administration's plans.

At 7:36 p.m., ten minutes after Boasberg's written order was published, a third deportation flight departed from Harlingen. The three flights carried 137 Venezuelans deported under the Act, 101 deported under regular immigration law, and 23 Salvadorans accused of membership in the MS-13 gang. An Immigration and Customs Enforcement official later told the court that none of the deportees on this third flight were deported under the Alien Enemies Act. Later that evening, each of the three planes landed at Soto Cano air base in Comayagua, Honduras, and after a period of time, each left Honduras, landing in San Salvador, El Salvador, in the early hours of the morning of March 16. Taken together, the three flights took over 260 migrants to El Salvador, where they were taken into custody at the Terrorism Confinement Center. Bukele, tweeted that 238 of the alleged gang members are associated with Tren de Aragua and 23 with MS-13.

The following morning, Bukele responded to the Boasberg's temporary restraining order with "Oopsie...too late" and a crying-with-laughter emoji in a post on X. Some Trump administration officials joined in on what Salon described as "mocking" the judge's order. Secretary of State Marco Rubio recirculated (reposted) Bukele's message, as did White House communications director Steven Cheung, who added a clip of smiling actor Denzel Washington saying "Boom!" Elon Musk replied to Bukele with another such emoji. On March 31, the government deported more Venezuelans to CECOT. State Department spokesperson Tammy Bruce declined to comment when asked what authorization they were using to make these deportations.

== US withholds names ==
The United States has not provided a list of names, evidence of crimes, or evidence of affiliation to Tren de Aragua to families or the media, with White House Press Secretary Karoline Leavitt stating that she was "not going to reveal operational details about a counterterrorism operation." This set off what the Associated Press described as a "scramble" as families tried to learn what had happened to loved ones who had been removed from ICE's online detainee locator. Some were able to identify them through media released by El Salvador. Families have not heard from their relatives since their deportation and subsequent detention. The names of the 238 Venezuelans were published by CBS News on March 20 from an internal government document that it had obtained. A few weeks later, during a visit from Bukele to the White House, the government provided the names of a small number of the men who were deported.

On July 17, 404 Media published the names of over three dozen men whose names were on the flight manifests of the three flights, but whose names had not been previously identified. The information came from a hacker who had stolen it from GlobalX, the company that flew the planes. The news organization first removed the names of guards, the women on the flights who were sent back to the US, and men whose names had already been confirmed by the US government, as the article was intended to identify additional men whose families do not know where they are and who might be in CECOT. 404 Media found the names of several men on the manifests who are known to have been deported to El Salvador, though the executive director of Together and Free, an organization that has assisted the families of deportees, said there was no way to know whether all of the people on the manifests were actually on the flights.

== Duration of imprisonment ==
The 238 Venezuelans' stay in CECOT is open-ended. Bukele has said that they were transferred to CECOT for a one-year period that could be renewed, and an internal memo from El Salvador's foreign ministry stated the country would house those it received from the US for one year, "pending the United States' decision on their long term disposition." The Associated Press reports that it is not clear when and how the deportees could ever be released, as they are not serving sentences. They have not appeared before a judge in El Salvador and are no longer in ICE's online detainee locator. El Salvador's prisons and CECOT in particular are deliberately harsh, and Gustavo Villatoro, the country's Minister of Justice and Public Security, has previously said that those held at CECOT would never return to their communities.

== Terrorism Confinement Center ==
Paula Xinis, judge of the lawsuit contesting Abrego Garcia's deportation to the Terrorism Confinement Center, described it as "one of the most notoriously inhumane and dangerous prisons in the world" that "by design, deprives its detainees of adequate food, water, and shelter" and "fosters routine violence". The Terrorism Confinement Center was built during El Salvador's ongoing crackdown on gang violence and some basic rights, and is the centerpiece of the effort. Social media influencers and foreign journalists have been invited to document the harshness of its conditions to promote the clampdown, and it's a darling of Latin American politicians seeking to burnish their "tough on crime" image. According to Newsweek, "The government of El Salvador told United Nations investigators that the Trump administration retains control over a group of Venezuelan men deported from the U.S. to a controversial Salvadoran prison—contradicting public claims made by officials in both countries. The admission appears in new court filings by attorneys for more than 100 migrants contesting their deportation to the Terrorism Confinement Center..."

=== Conditions ===
Prisoners are held in large cement cells that the Associated Press reports can house 65 to 70 each, though in governmental "slickly produced videos" the cells lack enough bunks for everyone. The BBC points out that with severely restricted access and journalists only allowed on occasional, carefully choreographed tours, the number of inmates per cell is not clear, with some rights groups putting it at 80, others saying it can go up to more than 150. Asked by the BBC about maximum capacity, CECOT's director responded "where you can fit 10 people, you can fit 20." The cells are furnished with four-story bunks of bare metal without mattresses or sheets, two toilets, two sinks, and two Bibles. The cells are artificially lit 24 hours a day, and the temperature can reach 35 °C in the day.

Prisoners are allowed to leave their cells for 30 minutes a day for group exercise in a corridor. There are no visits, workshops, or prison educational programs, and prisoners are not allowed outside. The food, which journalist Liam Bartlett stated is the same each day, is served without utensils, to keep them from being fashioned into weapons. Occasionally, prisoners who have gained a level of trust give motivational talks. No external institutions or NGOs are allowed access, and the Latin America Working Group notes prisoners have no access to a lawyer.

El Salvador's Minister of Justice has said those held at CECOT would never return to their communities, and the BBC in 2024 cited Miguel Sarre, formerly of the United Nations Subcommittee for the Prevention of Torture, as warning that CECOT appeared to be used "to dispose of people without formally applying the death penalty," referring to the fact that no-one had so far been released from the jail. Cristosal, which the BBC described as El Salvador's primary human rights organization, has documented torture and more than 150 deaths in custody in the country during the State of Emergency. Amnesty International accused Salvadoran authorities of "a systematic policy of torture towards all those detained under the state of emergency on suspicion of being gang members," leading to deaths in custody, while other prisoners have died due to inhumane conditions and denial of medical care and medicine. John Raphling of Human Rights Watch spoke of being "incredibly overcrowded," with "severe brutality, even amounting to torture under international human rights law definitions, and people being held out of communication with anyone on the outside."

=== Proposals to incarcerate American citizens ===
As part of the agreement with America to house people of any nationality in CECOT, Bukele offered to take in convicted criminals serving their sentence in the United States who were U.S. citizens or legal residents. He confirmed the statement on X, saying he offered USA "the opportunity to outsource part of its prison system." The U.S. government cannot deport American citizens, and Secretary of State Rubio said that "Obviously we'll have to study it on our end. There are obviously legalities involved. We have a Constitution, we have all sorts of things" while calling it "a very generous offer," noting "No one's ever made an offer like that" and that it would cost a fraction of imprisoning criminals in the U.S. He said that "obviously the administration will have to make a decision."

Trump said he was looking into whether he could move forward with the offer, telling reporters "I'm just saying if we had a legal right to do it, I would do it in a heartbeat" and "I don't know if we do or not, we're looking at that right now." Asked about subsidizing incarcerating American criminals in other countries, Trump said it would be a "small fee compared to what we pay to private prisons," that several countries had already agreed to host American prisoners, and that "It's no different than a prison system except it would be less expensive and it would be a great deterrent." Elon Musk called the proposal a "Great idea!!" on X. Rubio in his remarks specified that this would apply to dangerous criminals; Politico noted that meanwhile, Bukele said on X that El Salvador would gladly take U.S. ex-senator Bob Menendez, who was serving a 11-year prison sentence for bribery but who was not a violent criminal.

Trump later suggested on Truth Social that the "sick terrorist thugs" responsible for the recent vandalism of Tesla property could be sent to Salvadoran prisons, "which have become so recently famous for such lovely conditions." Politico cited Insha Rahman, vice president of advocacy in the Vera Institute of Justice, as saying there's no precedent to send U.S. citizens outside the country to serve sentences in other countries; "It is so beyond the pale of anything contemplated by the Constitution or due process or the criminal courts." Lauren-Brooke Eisen, the senior director of the justice program at the Brennan Center for Justice, told Politico in a statement that the Eighth Amendment to the U.S. Constitution prohibits cruel and unusual punishments such as excessive sentences or inhumane prison conditions, and that deporting Americans would be illegal under the First Step Act, which requires the federal government to send those convicted of federal crimes to "a facility as close as practicable to the prisoner's primary residence, and to the extent practicable, in a facility within 500 driving miles of that residence." Trump further told reporters that he would discuss sending Americans to El Salvador's prisons during Bukele's White House visit,. He gave his stance as "I love it" and that he would be honored, but that he'd have to see what the law says, "but I can't imagine the law would say anything different... If they can house these horrible criminals for a lot less money than it costs us, I'm all for it."

The BBC noted that while U.S. citizens enjoy legal protection from deportation, it is possible for naturalized citizens to be denaturalized. This tends to happen when the citizenship was fraudulently obtained, but citizens suspected of ties to criminal gangs or terrorist organizations, such as Tren de Aragua or MS-13, could, in theory, be stripped of citizenship. They would then be at risk of deportation, although such a move would need a formal court process. Born U.S. citizens could not be denaturalized.

== Legal issues ==
=== J.G.G. v Donald J. Trump ===
J.G.G. v. TRUMP
- Court: United States District Court for the District of Columbia
- Started: March 15, 2025
- Docket nos.: 1:25-cv-00766

Court membership
- Judge sitting: James Emanuel Boasberg

J.G.G. v. Donald J. Trump is a class action and habeas corpus lawsuit by 5 Venezuelan men in immigration custody who were threatened with imminent removal under Trump's expected proclamation invoking the Alien Enemies Act. Neither the U.S. nor Salvadoran governments offered any details or evidence to support their claims that those deported had been charged with crimes or had connections to any gangs. A 60 Minutes investigation failed to find any U.S. or foreign criminal charges against 179 of those deported, only finding serious criminal charges against about a dozen.

Axios reported one Trump administration official acknowledging that the Trump administration had carried out the deportations "after a discussion about how far the judge's ruling can go under the circumstances and over international waters and, on advice of counsel", while a second Trump administration official commented: "They were already outside of US airspace. We believe the order [by the judge] is not applicable". Later, White House Press Secretary Karoline Leavitt stated that Boasberg's order "had no lawful basis" and was given after the accused "had already been removed from U.S. territory", while further stating: "A single judge in a single city cannot direct the movements of an aircraft carrier". Whistleblower and former DOJ attorney, Erez Reuveni later alleged that Trump administration officials including Emil Bove had deliberately misled the court, withheld information from it and advised agencies the court's orders did not have to be followed.

In a March 21 hearing, Boasberg described this use of the Enemy Aliens Act as "incredibly troublesome and problematic", adding that it appeared the administration anticipated the proclamation was problematic given that they had it "signed in the dark" of night. In the court, ACLU lawyers argued that foreign nationals are entitled to due process under the U.S. Constitution. The judge also expressed frustration with the government's lack of cooperation and stated "I will get to the bottom of whether they violated my order and who ordered this."

On March 24, Boasberg denied the Trump administration's request to lift the blocking the Trump administration from deporting Venezuelan migrants with the invocation of the wartime powers. He ruled that those who have been deported under the Alien Enemies Act must be allowed to challenge their removal. On March 28, the Trump administration filed an emergency appeal with the U.S. Supreme Court. On April 7, the court vacated Boasberg's orders, ruling that the District of Columbia was the wrong jurisdiction for challenges to removal, as such challenges must be filed where a petitioner is detained.

=== Trump petition to the U.S. District Court for the District of Columbia ===
Trump petitioned for writ of mandamus and sought to file amici curiae. The motion for amici curiae was unopposed, and on June 22, 2026, the court granted it. The court also vacated its April 14 order and scheduled the case for rehearing en banc on September 29.

=== Alleged torture at CECOT ===
Human rights organizations have claimed that CECOT inmates suffer various kinds of abuse, sometimes including torture. Princeton University law professor Rebecca Ingber and Scott Roehm, director of global policy and advocacy at the Center for Victims of Torture, write that because of the potential for torture, it may have been illegal to send the deportees there under US law. Denying the government's motion to vacate his restraining order on March 23, Boasberg cited the UN Convention against Torture (CAT) and US law implementing it as an "obstacle" to deporting migrants for incarceration at CECOT due to the "likelihood of potential torture" there.

On March 28, U.S. district judge Brian E. Murphy ordered that no migrants be deported to a nation other than that covered in immigration proceedings without a "meaningful opportunity" to make a claim under CAT. Despite this order, on March 30 the US sent 17 migrants it alleged without providing evidence to be members of Tren de Aragua and MS-13 on US military planes to El Salvador to be confined at CECOT. Government whistleblower Erez Reuveni later alleged these deportations had been carried out in knowing violation of the court's order and that he had been instructed not to inquire or communicate in writing about these violations. On May 7, after reports the administration was preparing to deport members of the class covered by Murphy's order to countries such as Libya and Saudi Arabia, the judge issued a second order clarifying that those countries were included in his initial order.

=== Criminalization of asylum ===
Human rights organizations have raised concerns about the misuse of visual or cultural stereotypes as justification for deportations, often carried out before scheduled court hearings or pending legal decisions. This practice has been criticized for undermining the principles of international law and fundamental rights to legal defense and asylum. One of the most notable of the purported cases is that of Jerce Reyes Barrios, a 36-year-old Venezuelan footballer who was deported to El Salvador by the Trump administration due to his alleged association with the Tren de Aragua. Reyes Barrios had legally entered the United States in 2024 and applied for asylum after allegedly fleeing torture in Venezuela. He was scheduled to appear in court in April but was removed from the country without prior notice.

=== Alien Enemy Validation Guide ===
In a court filing the ACLU shared what they believe to be a guide ICE uses in determining who is a member of Tren de Aragua. It's based on a point system where each item is worth 2-10 points. Anyone with 8 point is to be labeled as a gang member, but individuals with as few as 6 points can also be labeled as a gang member with a supervisor's authorization. In one example given by ABC, "Communicating electronically with a known TdA member is worth six points" which seems it could be enough on its own to label someone as a gang member.

=== Use of ordinary tattoos as evidence ===
The United States government has labeled migrants sent to Guantánamo as members of the Tren de Aragua, primarily based on tattoos believed to be associated with the gang, such as crowns, flowers, phrases like "real hasta la muerte," a crown on a soccer ball, an eyeball that "looked cool" and the silhouette of Michael Jordan. However, defense attorneys argue that the arrests have been made without concrete evidence, and former Venezuelan officials deny that the gang used any specific tattoo symbolism.

Andrés Antillano, a criminology professor who has studied the Tren de Aragua in his research at the Central University of Venezuela, said that although tattoos are common in Central American gangs, that was not the case for Tren de Aragua, and that trying to identify members using tattoos was "absurd" and "naïve". Ronna Rísquez, a Venezuelan journalist who has written a book on Tren de Aragua said "Tren de Aragua does not use any tattoos as a form of gang identification; no Venezuelan gang does."

Linette Tobin, lawyer for the detained Jerce Reyes Barrios stated that there is no evidence linking him to the criminal organization, that the Department of Homeland Security's (DHS) only basis for such a link consisted of a tattoo resembling Real Madrid symbols and a photograph in which he made a sign language gesture, and that his whereabouts have remained unknown since his deportation on March 15. According to a report by Mother Jones, one detainee had been asked by an ICE agent if he knew why he was there, and when he said he did not, the agent replied that he was there because of his tattoos - and that ICE was finding and questioning anyone who has tattoos. According to the BBC, one of nine images the government has used for "detecting and identifying" Tren de Aragua gang members is a photo of the arm tattoo of a 44-year-old man in Ilkeston, England. He described himself as "I'm just an average middle-aged man from Derbyshire."

=== "Administrative errors" ===
==== Kilmar Armando Abrego Garcia ====
Kilmar Armando Abrego Garcia, a Salvadoran with protected legal status in the United States, was mistakenly deported to El Salvador on March 15, 2025, an action the Trump administration admitted was an "administrative error" while also accusing him of being a member and leader of the MS-13 gang, a claim which Abrego Garcia disputes. Government attorney Erez Reuveni was fired after refusing to sign an appeal brief in Abrego Garcia's case that included assertions and arguments he believed to be untrue. Despite a court order prohibiting his removal due to the risk of persecution, he was detained by ICE and transferred to CECOT. His wife and their disabled son, both U.S. citizens, filed a lawsuit over the illegal deportation. The White House claimed to have intelligence linking him to human trafficking, while human rights groups and bipartisan lawmakers criticized the use of the Alien Enemies Act to justify deportations based on tattoos. The case sparked controversy amid a broader immigration crackdown that continued despite a partial judicial suspension. On April 4, District Court Judge Paula Xinis ordered the government to return Abrego to the U.S., calling his deportation "an illegal act." The U.S. government has argued it has no legal authority to return him. Abrego Garcia's legal team stated the administration has failed to make any attempt "to rectify what they themselves describe as an error." On May 7, Xinis revealed the administration had invoked the state secrets privilege in the case and set a hearing on the issue for May 16. On June 6, 2025, the government brought Abrego Garcia back to the US, and the DOJ announced that he had been indicted in Tennessee for unlawfully transporting illegal immigrants for financial gain and conspiring to do so.

==== Jordin Melgar-Salmeron ====
On May 7, 2025, the administration deported Salvadoran Jordin Melgar-Salmeron to El Salvador's notorious Izalco prison after a panel of the Second Circuit Court of Appeals issued an order allowing him to remain in the US during the pendency of his immigration case. Melgar-Salmeron had asked for a stay of his deportation order so he could appeal an immigration judge's denial of his plea for relief under the Convention against Torture. Again, the administration blamed "a confluence of administrative errors," in this case missing and miscommunications between ICE offices in Buffalo and New Orleans, for deporting Melgar-Salmeron after it had assured the court he would not be deported before its scheduled ruling. Melgar-Salmeron, who claimed he had ended his previous affiliation with MS-13, was in immigration custody following a prison sentence for entering the US without permission and firearms possession. His attorney planned to ask the court to refer criminal contempt charges against those responsible for his client's deportation. On June 24, the appeals court ordered the government to facilitate Melgar-Salmeron's return to the US and report within a week on his physical location and status and the steps taken toward his return. It also determined that further proceedings regarding contempt were not needed at the time.

=== Blanco Bonilla v. CSI Aviation, Inc. ===
On July 17, 2026, three of the Venezuelan men who were deported filed a class action suit against the airline companies that transported the men to El Salvador, CSI Aviation and GlobalX, accusing the companies of "violating the Venezuelans’ civil rights, false imprisonment, intentional infliction of emotional distress, negligence and other violations". The men are represented by the Kennedy Human Rights Center, and the suit was assigned to the same judge overseeing J.G.G. v Trump, James Boasberg.

== Deportees ==
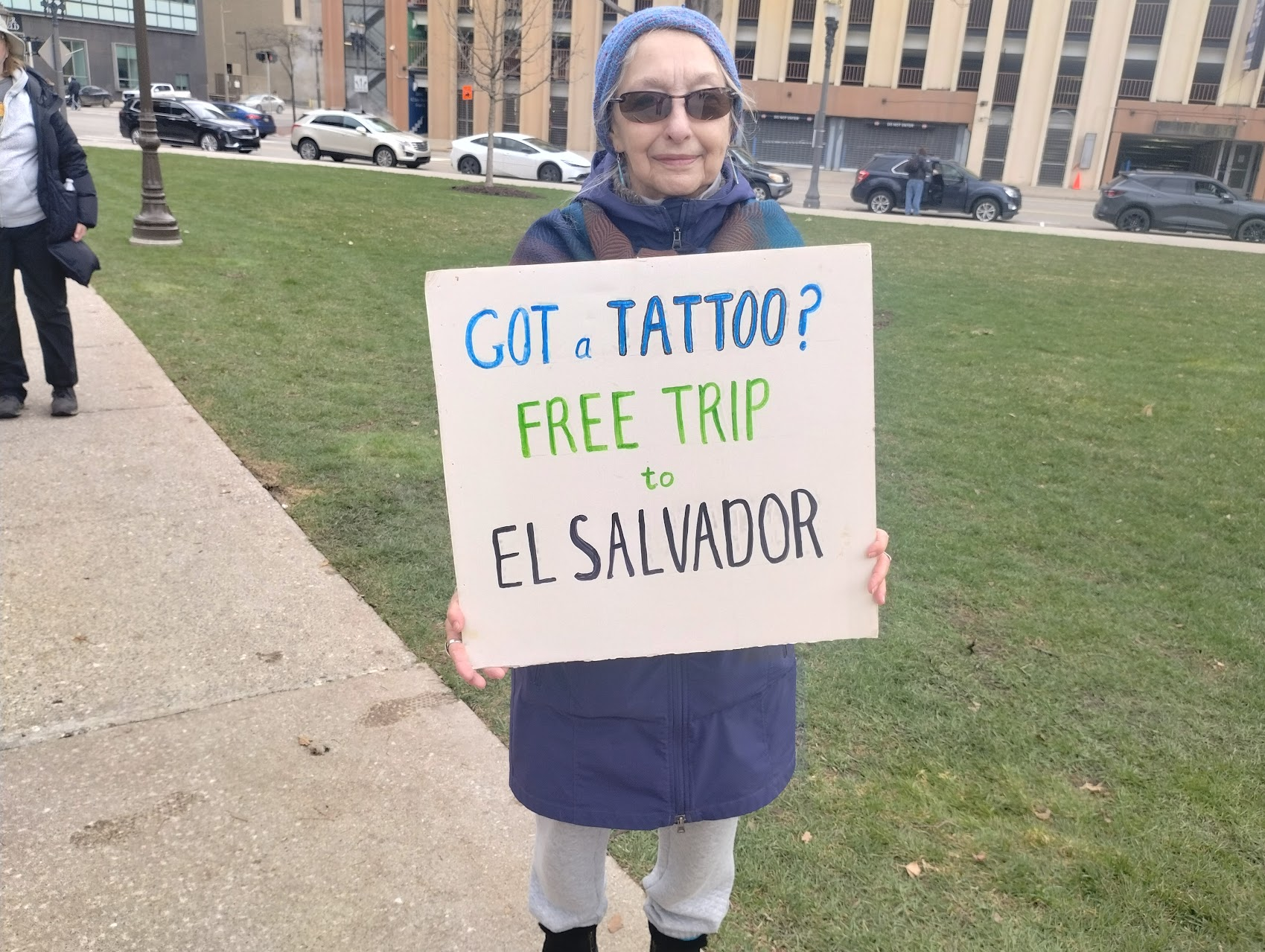
A woman protesting the deportation of people to El Salvador because of tattoos

According to Time, on intake the prisoners were physically bludgeoned and had their heads forcibly shaved. One of them sobbed and protested that "I'm not a gang member. I'm gay; I'm a barber". A propaganda video shared by Bukele on X shows the men being dragged and having their heads shaved. Juanita Goebertus Estrada, the director of the Americas division of Human Rights Watch described such videos as designed to "humiliate and try to dehumanize the people who are detained there".

Eight women and one Nicaraguan man were on the deportation flights. They were not accepted by the Salvadoran government and returned to the US. According to some of these women, all of the detainees were arm and leg shackled for the entire flight including a several hour stopover to refuel. They also allege detainees were threatened by government officials who were pushing them to sign documents stating they were gang members, and that immigration agents repeatedly lied to the deportees, telling them that they were being taken to Venezuela.

Some of the deported signed voluntary deportation agreements thinking they would be deported to Venezuela and could, in theory, later reapply to return to the US, but they were instead sent to CECOT. Lawyers for the accused claim that their clients are not gang members and were deported for everyday tattoos including a crown over a soccer ball and flowers. In a court filing, the administration stated that "many" of those who had been deported do not have criminal records in the US. A 60 Minutes investigation found that 75% of the men had no criminal records, and most of the rest had records involving non-violent crimes like theft, though "about a dozen are accused of more serious crimes, including murder, rape, assault and kidnapping." A similar investigation from Bloomberg, focused on the 238 Venezuelans who were deported, found that approximately 90% had no criminal record, and that of the remaining men, several had only been charged with traffic or immigration violations.

=== Jerce Reyes Barrios ===
Jerce Reyes Barrios is a 35-year-old Venezuelan and former professional soccer player. He was among those deported to the maximum security prison in El Salvador. Barrios came to the US legally seeking asylum after he was arrested and tortured by the Maduro regime. According to a court filing by Barrios' lawyer, ICE evaluated Barrios as a gang member based on his Real Madrid tattoo and a hand gesture from social media.

=== "E.M." ===
A man Miami Herald identified as "E.M." and his girlfriend fled persecution to Colombia. They were granted refugee status in the U.S., but upon arrival in Houston on January 8 he was detained on suspicion of being a Tren de Aragua member over his tattoos of a crown, a soccer ball and a palm tree, while she opted to be deported to Colombia. He was held until March 15, when he was deported to El Salvador and imprisoned in CECOT. E.M.'s family were not informed he had been deported. His alien registration number disappeared from the online immigration system, and they had no idea where he was until finding his name on a list published by CBS News.

=== Andres Guillermo Morales ===
Morales is a dual Colombian-Venezuelan citizen. Reuters independently confirmed that he had a legal work permit in the United States as a part of his asylum application, and he worked for an air-conditioning and cement company. Reuters also confirmed that he has no criminal record in Colombia. His wife stated that none of his tattoos were connected to gang activity but instead depicted his parents' names, a clock, a star with music notes, and a Bible verse. Morales signed a deportation order for Colombia and was told by Colombia's consulate in San Francisco that he would be deported to Bogota, Colombia. However, he was instead deported to the maximum security prison in El Salvador.

=== Javier Garcia Casique ===
Casique is a barber who, according to his mother, arrived in the US in December 2023 seeking asylum. She recognized him from photos of the people being deported, denied that he is a gang member, and said his tattoos said "peace" and the names of family members.

=== Andry José Hernández Romero ===
In March 2025, the U.S. government deported Andry José Hernández Romero, a 31-year-old gay Venezuelan makeup artist seeking asylum, to CECOT after identifying him as a member of the criminal gang Tren de Aragua based on tattoos of crowns that are a religious tradition in his hometown of Capacho. Hernández Romero, who fled Venezuela due to persecution over his sexual orientation and political beliefs, had no criminal record. His deportation was carried out under the Alien Enemies Act of 1798, invoked by the Trump administration to expel alleged gang members without individual court hearings, a move later blocked by District Judge James Boasberg, who ruled the migrants were entitled to individualized hearings. Hernández Romero's detention in CECOT, a facility notorious for human rights abuses, drew criticism from human rights advocates and public figures including podcast host Joe Rogan, who condemned the situation as "horrific." The case has sparked broader concerns about the Trump administration's immigration policies and the deportation of individuals without criminal ties.

According to his lawyer, Hernández arrived in the U.S. seeking asylum, and his tattoos were what you "would see on anybody at a coffee shop". His family believed he was being deported to Venezuela but he was instead sent to CECOT. According to a December 2024 form, Hernández's identification as a TdA member was solely based on two crown tattoos on his wrists next to the words "Mom" and "Dad". In April 2025, the Milwaukee Journal Sentinel reported that the CoreCivic private contractor who signed off on Hernández's identification as member of the gang on behalf of ICE was a former police officer that Milwaukee County prosecutors had put on a list of police officers with credibility issues if they were to testify in court because of issues such as lying or lawbreaking. The officer was fired from the Milwaukee Police Department in 2012 after drunkenly crashing into a home while under investigation for alleged overtime fraud; he appealed but resigned, ending the process. Following his release, he described being raped by prison officials. DHS spokesperson Tricia McLaughlin tweeted "This man's own social media indicates he is a member of Tren de Aragua."

=== Jose Franco Caraballo Tiapa ===
Caraballo is a barber who came to the US illegally with his wife by not crossing the border at a prescribed point of entry. Claiming asylum, they were released and ordered to check in regularly with ICE during the process of seeking asylum in the United States. Caraballo's first court appearance was scheduled to be before an immigration judge on March 19; however, he was detained at a routine check-in on February 3. According to his lawyer, an ICE agent had noticed a tattoo of a clock on his arm, showing the time of his daughter's birth. WLRN writes that this is a popular style of tattoo in Venezuela, but one US authorities identify as a favorite of Tren de Aragua. WLRN goes on to note that according to court records it had reviewed, ICE agents, apparently solely on that basis, accused Caraballo of being a TdA member. He was deported to the maximum security prison in El Salvador on March 15. His wife and lawyer were not informed why his name had vanished from ICE's online detainee locator. Caraballo does not have a criminal record in Venezuela. According to his wife, while there he had taken part in marches against the Venezuelan government that were led by Venezuelan opposition leader María Corina Machado, and in 2019 was held in two days and beaten while in custody.

=== Jhon Chacin ===
Jhon Chacin is a tattoo artist. His application for asylum was denied and he signed an agreement to be deported back to Venezuela. His flight home was postponed due to bad weather. Then his brother recognized him in a video from the El Salvador deportations.

=== Merwil Gutiérrez ===
Merwil Gutiérrez was detained on February 24, 2025, abducted outside his home in the Bronx, NY. He has no criminal record in the US or Venezuela and no tattoos. He and other family members legally entered the US in 2023 using the CBP One system. He was granted Temporary Protected Status in 2023. They were living and working while waiting for their asylum hearing scheduled for February 2027. ICE did not respond to questions regarding his detention or his transfer, first to Texas and then to CECOT.

=== Ricardo Prada Vásquez ===
Ricardo Prada Vásquez entered the US November 29, 2024 under the Biden administration's CBP One program. He was working as a delivery driver in Detroit while awaiting disposition of his case. On January 15, 2025, he made a wrong turn which took him over the Ambassador Bridge into Canada. ICE detained him as he attempted to reenter the US. After failing to obtain legal representation, he was ordered deported and eventually transferred to an ICE facility in south Texas. On March 15, the day of the migrant flights to El Salvador, he called a friend to report that he might soon be deported to Venezuela. Prada does not appear on lists of those deported to El Salvador on March 15 nor does he appear in videos from that day. ICE initially confirmed that he was deported but did not disclose where he was deported to. Neither immigrant advocacy organizations nor news media were able to confirm Prada's whereabouts. On April 22, following the publication of a New York Times story on Prada, Homeland Security spokeswoman Tricia McLaughlin told the paper that Prada was sent to El Salvador on March 15, and that the department had concluded that he was a member of the Tren de Aragua gang, but did not explain why his name was absent from official records of deportations. Immigration advocates and legal scholars raised concerns that the apparent confusion and disarray in the deportation system may mean more migrants had been deported to El Salvador or other countries than the administration had disclosed.

=== Daniel Lozano-Camargo ===
In December 2024, the Biden administration settled a class action lawsuit, J.O.P. v. Department of Homeland Security, agreeing that individuals who had arrived in the U.S. as unaccompanied minors and later claimed asylum would not be deported until their asylum claims had been fully adjudicated. Daniel Lozano-Camargo, a member of the class, was among those deported to CECOT on March 15. He was 20 years old at the time of his deportation, but arrived in the US when he was 17, and is identified in court records as "Cristian". Lozano-Camargo was arrested twice for possession of cocaine and pleaded guilty to possession as part of a plea deal in January 2025, at which point he was transferred to ICE custody. His mother has said "They took him to El Salvador, as if they were animals, as if my son were a criminal, just for having tattoos on his body". He has several tattoos, including hands in prayer, the names of his girlfriend and grandmother, and a rose.

On April 23, U.S. District Judge Stephanie Gallagher, drawing on the Supreme Court ruling in the case of Salvadoran migrant Kilmar Abrego Garcia, ordered the administration to make "a good faith request to the government of El Salvador to release Cristian to U.S. custody for transport back to the United States to await the adjudication of his asylum application on the merits." The judge further ordered that a second class member, identified as "Javier" and also in U.S. custody, not be deported. In June, Gallagher ordered the DOJ to provide status updates about "the steps they have taken and will take to facilitate" Lozano-Camargo's return. The DOJ reported that the Department of State (DOS) was attempting to negotiate his return. On July 7, in J.G.G. v. Trump, lawyers for the Venezuelans deported under the AEA introduced a document in which the government of El Salvador had told the United Nations that "the jurisdiction and legal responsibility" for people sent to CECOT from another country was "exclusively with the competent foreign authorities". The next day, Gallagher made note of the document, and gave the DOJ a week to explain why it had said "'diplomatic discussions' involving the DOS are required to facilitate" Lozano-Camargo's return.

== International relations ==
=== El Salvador ===
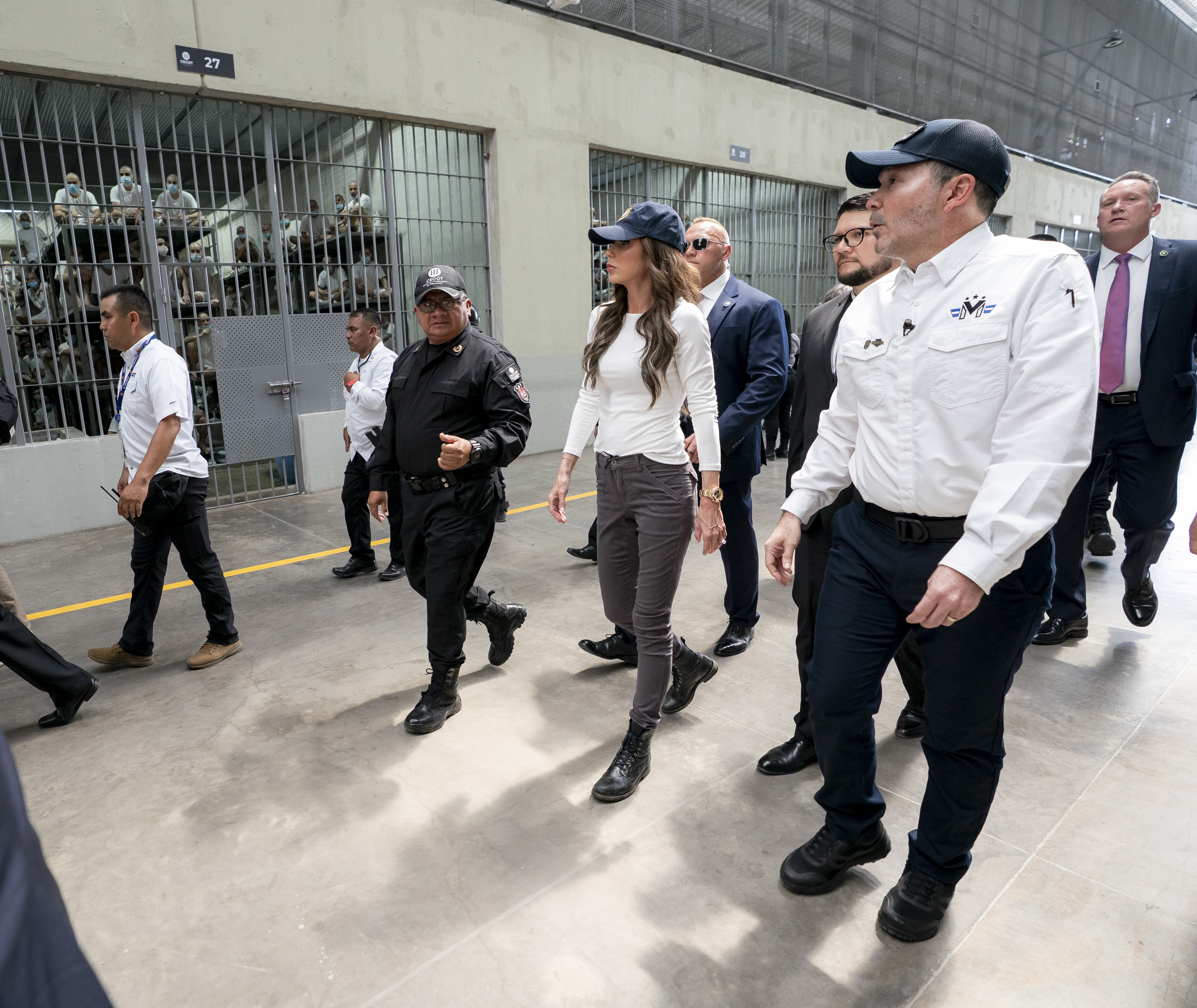
CECOT director Belarmino García, U.S. homeland secretary Kristi Noem, and Salvadoran minister of justice Gustavo Villatoro inside the prison one week after the deportation of 238 Venezuelans

The United States reportedly agreed to pay El Salvador US$6 million to imprison 300 alleged members of the Venezuelan Tren de Aragua gang. El Salvador's Foreign Ministry confirmed that there was a one-year agreement with the possibility to extend it long-term. The agreement, made public in response to a lawsuit, provided US$4.76 million to El Salvador and incorporated several conditions including that none of the funds be used for legal counseling or referrals for the detainees. Individuals involved with the drafting and interpretation of the Leahy Law prohibiting the US Departments of State and Defense from funding foreign security force units that violate human rights have stated this agreement possibly violated the law. Congressional Democrats were seeking information about the agreement, while the administration claimed it was following applicable law.

As part of the deportation flights the US dropped charges against a key alleged MS-13 leader. According to court documents and former US officials, he may have had information which could implicate top Salvadoran government officials. A former federal agent who spent years working on gang cases including MS-13 described it as a "historical loss" and said "He was a potential high-level source. And he doesn't get to face US justice."

According to documents obtained by the AP, El Salvador would receive $20,000 per detainee, totaling around $6 million paid by the United States, with the possibility of additional payments of up to $15 million. Bukele stated that the payments would contribute to the self-sufficiency of the prison system, whose annual cost reaches $200 million, and highlighted prison labor as part of the "Zero Idleness" program. The agreement was signed between Bukele and U.S. Secretary of State Marco Rubio during an official visit to Central America, being described as "unprecedented" and even involving the reception of American citizens. Experts point out that the agreement strengthens political ties between Bukele and Donald Trump, who publicly praised him, and provides diplomatic benefits to the Salvadoran government, such as the U.S. silence in the face of human rights violation accusations under El Salvador's prolonged state of emergency. Organizations like Human Rights Watch report that the deportees are being sent to a prison system accused of torture, deaths in custody, and arbitrary detentions, portraying CECOT as a "Guantánamo of Central America." In late March 2026 a group of human rights organizations filed a petition with the Inter-American Commission on Human Rights on behalf of detainees asking that the Commission declare El Salvador's agreement with the US violated its human rights obligations and that El Salvador should provide a public apology, reparations and rehabilitation resources.

=== Venezuela ===
Maduro's government called the transfers a "kidnapping" and denied any links between the deportees and the gang. Jorge Rodríguez, Maduro's chief negotiator with the U.S., stated that, "Migrating is not a crime and we will not rest until we achieve the return of all those who require it and until we rescue our brothers kidnapped in El Salvador." Venezuelan Interior Minister Diosdado Cabello stated on a podcast that "not a single [deportee] appears on the organizational chart of the now-extinct Tren de Aragua organization".

On March 24, 2025, Venezuelan government lawyers filed habeas corpus petitions in Supreme Court of Justice of El Salvador for the detainees. On April 21, Bukele proposed a "humanitarian agreement" to Venezuelan President Nicolás Maduro, offering to exchange the 252 detained Venezuelan migrants, allegedly linked to Tren de Aragua, for an equal number of people of various nationalities held by the Maduro government, alleged by Bukele to be political prisoners. The Venezuelan attorney general, Tarek William Saab, condemned Bukele's proposal, calling it cynical and demanding immediate information on the detained migrants' identities, legal status, and medical conditions.

=== Prisoner exchange among El Salvador, Venezuela, and the United States ===
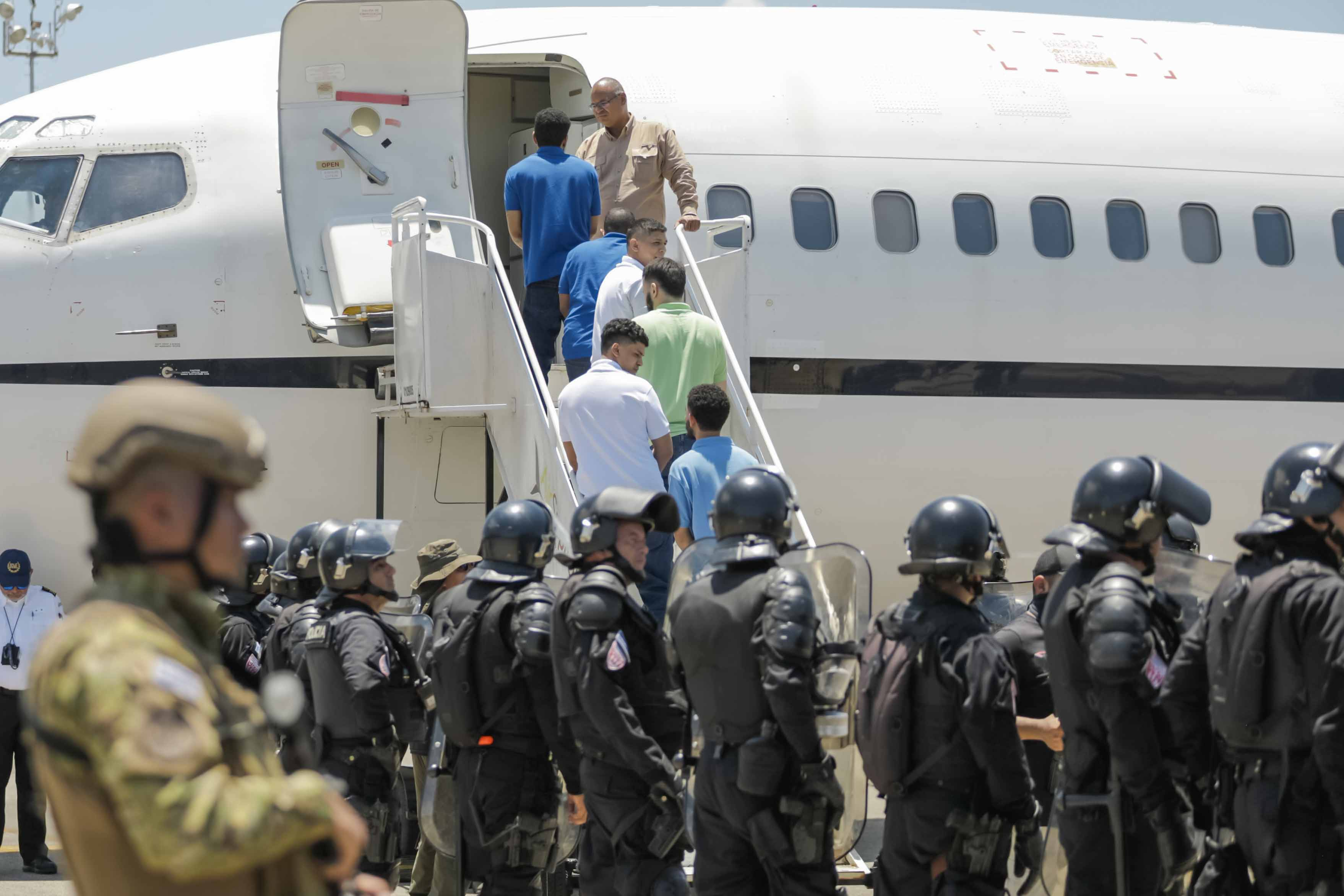
Venezuelans boarding the plane that will return them to their country of origin

On July 18, an exchange took place in which 252 Venezuelans who had been deported by the U.S. and held in CECOT were flown to Venezuela, and ten U.S. citizens who had been imprisoned by the Venezuelan government were flown to the U.S. As part of the agreement, the U.S. also flew seven children to Venezuela who had been separated from their Venezuelan parents when the U.S. deported the parents, and who were described by the Venezuelan government as having been "kidnapped", and the Venezuelan government released 80 Venezuelan political prisoners domestically, saying that it would instead use "alternative measures", perhaps referring to home detention.

The negotiations for the exchange involved the governments of El Salvador, Venezuela, and the U.S. Bukele said that the 252 Venezuelans involved were "all the Venezuelan nationals detained in our country". Some of them had been deported from the U.S. to El Salvador under the Alien Enemies Act on the March 15 flights, and others had been deported under standard U.S. deportation procedures. The Trump administration claimed that all of them were members of Tren de Aragua. Rubio said that all "wrongfully detained" Americans in Venezuela had been freed.

Bukele said the execution of the exchange was the result of a lengthy negotiation process with the Venezuelan government. In a press statement, Rubio thanked Bukele along with his State Department team and U.S. "interagency partners". Reporters from The Washington Post interviewed 16 of the Venezuelans who had been imprisoned at CECOT, and they reported extreme abuse, including one man who was "beaten unconscious"; another who was sexually assaulted; and others who were left bruised, bleeding, vomiting blood, or otherwise injured from the beatings. They also reported difficulty getting medical care for conditions such as diabetes, high blood pressure, or renal failure. Although most men at CECOT are in cells of 80 people, the Venezuelans deported by the US were instead in cells of 20 people.

== Reactions ==
Because the Trump administration did not release a list of the names of the men who had been taken to CECOT, family members often discovered this after recognizing their Venezuelan relatives in videos that were released by Bukele; other times, they assume it because they cannot reach him and he no longer appears in the immigration database. Parents have disputed gang affiliation claims made by the US and Salvadoran governments, asserting that their children did not have a criminal record, with one parent even providing an official Venezuelan document stating that her son has no criminal record.

Some Japanese Americans have expressed concern about the Alien Enemies Act being used again as, during internment in World War II, many innocent people were detained, and there was no oversight. The Brennan Center for Justice said in a statement that "The Alien Enemies Act may be used only during declared wars or armed attacks on the United States by foreign governments" and "The president has falsely proclaimed an invasion". Malcolm Ferguson in The New Republic, in response to the 60 Minutes report where they could not find criminal records for 75% of the deported men, said that this "proves that the Trump administration is carrying out its cruelty campaign indiscriminately."

UN High Commissioner for Human Rights Volker Türk said that the deportation over recent months of large numbers of non-nationals from the US, especially to countries other than those of their origin, raises a number of human rights concerns. "Families we have spoken to have expressed a sense of complete powerlessness in the face of what has happened and their pain at seeing their relatives labelled and handled as violent criminals, even terrorists, without any court judgment as to validity of what is claimed against them," Türk said.
