= Inauguration of Javier Milei =

2023 Argentine presidential inauguration ceremony

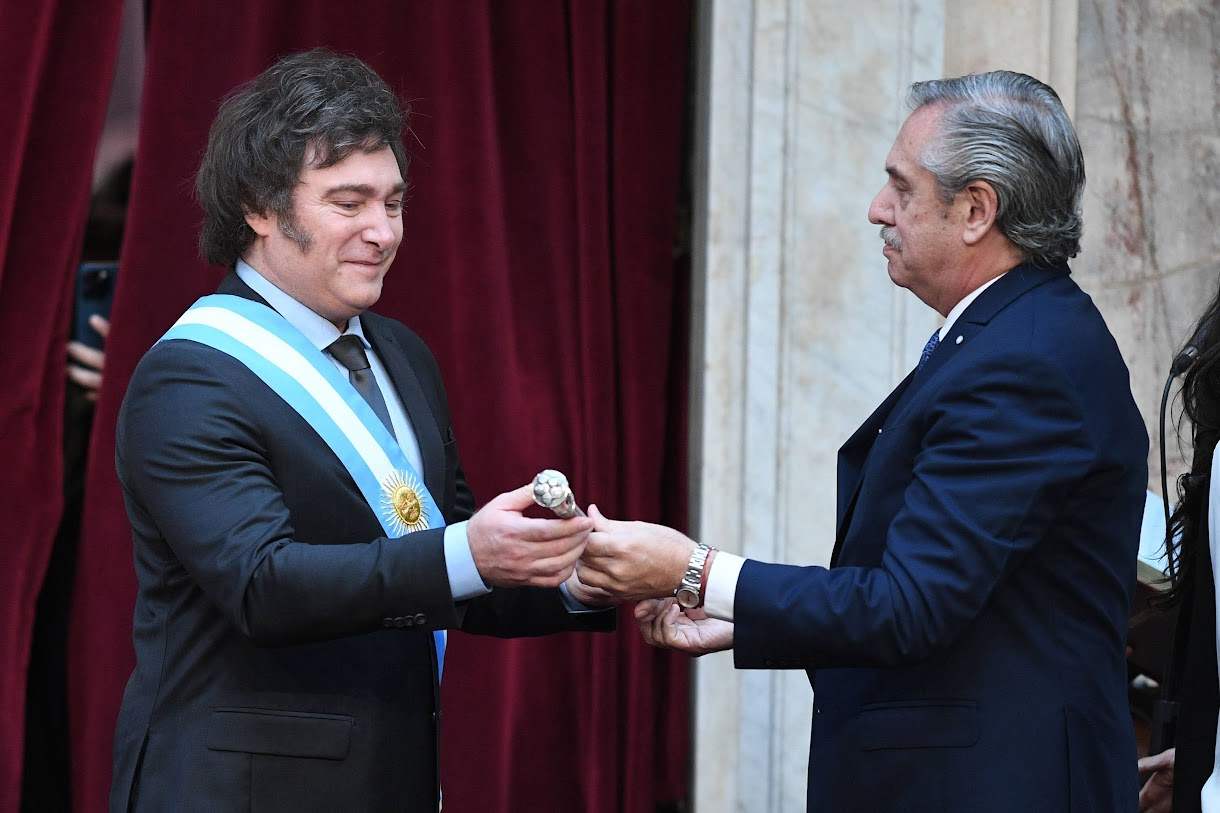
- Alberto Fernández handing over the presidential scepter to Javier Milei
- Date: 10 December 2023; 2 years ago
- Venue: Buenos Aires, Argentina
- Location: Palace of the Congress Casa Rosada
- Participants: Javier Milei (incoming); Victoria Villarruel (incoming); Alberto Fernández (outgoing); Cristina Fernández de Kirchner (outgoing)

The inauguration of Javier Milei as the president of Argentina took place on 10 December 2023, in the Argentine Chamber of Deputies in Buenos Aires. The inauguration marked the commencement of the four-year term of Milei as president and Victoria Villarruel as vice president. The inauguration marked the formal culmination of Milei's presidential transition that began after he won the 2023 Argentine presidential election held on 19 November 2023. Over twenty national leaders and representatives attended the ceremony.

== Background ==
Electoral map for the second round of the election. Milei won 55.65% of the votes against Sergio Massa, the biggest margin of victory since 1983.

The inauguration marked the culmination of the presidential transition of Javier Milei, who had become president-elect of Argentina after defeating Sergio Massa on 19 November 2023, and the formal start of the presidential administration of Milei. Victoria Villarruel became Milei's vice president. Despite being eligible for a second consecutive term, both incumbent president Alberto Fernández and incumbent vice president and former president Cristina Fernández de Kirchner did not seek re-election.

In the first round of the election on 22 October, Massa of the ruling Union for the Homeland unexpectedly came in first place, winning 36% of the vote, against Milei of La Libertad Avanza, who came in second place, with 30% of the vote. Massa's victory in the first round was seen as an upset because of the severe inflation that took place during Massa's tenure as Minister of Economy, as well as Milei's lead in polls up to that point.

In the runoff, Milei defeated Massa with 55.8% of the vote, the highest percentage of the vote since Argentina's transition to democracy. In a surprise reversal of the first round, Milei outperformed polls, which had been calling a much closer race. Massa conceded defeat shortly before the official results were published.

== Planning ==
=== Security and counter-terrorism efforts ===
According to reports, the inauguration ceremony was heavily guarded with the mobilization of 7,000 security personnel. Drones were utilized as part of the security measures.

== Pre-inaugural events ==
After winning the election, Milei announced upcoming visits to the United States and Israel before taking the oath. On 21 November, Milei met with the outgoing president Alberto Fernández. On 26 November, in an attempt to soften his image, Milei also invited the incumbent Brazilian president Luiz Inácio Lula da Silva, whom he had insulted as a communist and as someone he would not deal with during his campaign; Lula declined the invite. On 27 November, Milei visited the United States and prayed at the grave of the famous Orthodox rabbi Menachem Mendel Schneerson (1902–1994) in New York City. On 28 November, Milei announced that four countries (Cuba, Iran, Nicaragua, and Venezuela) were not invited to his inauguration.

== Inaugural events ==
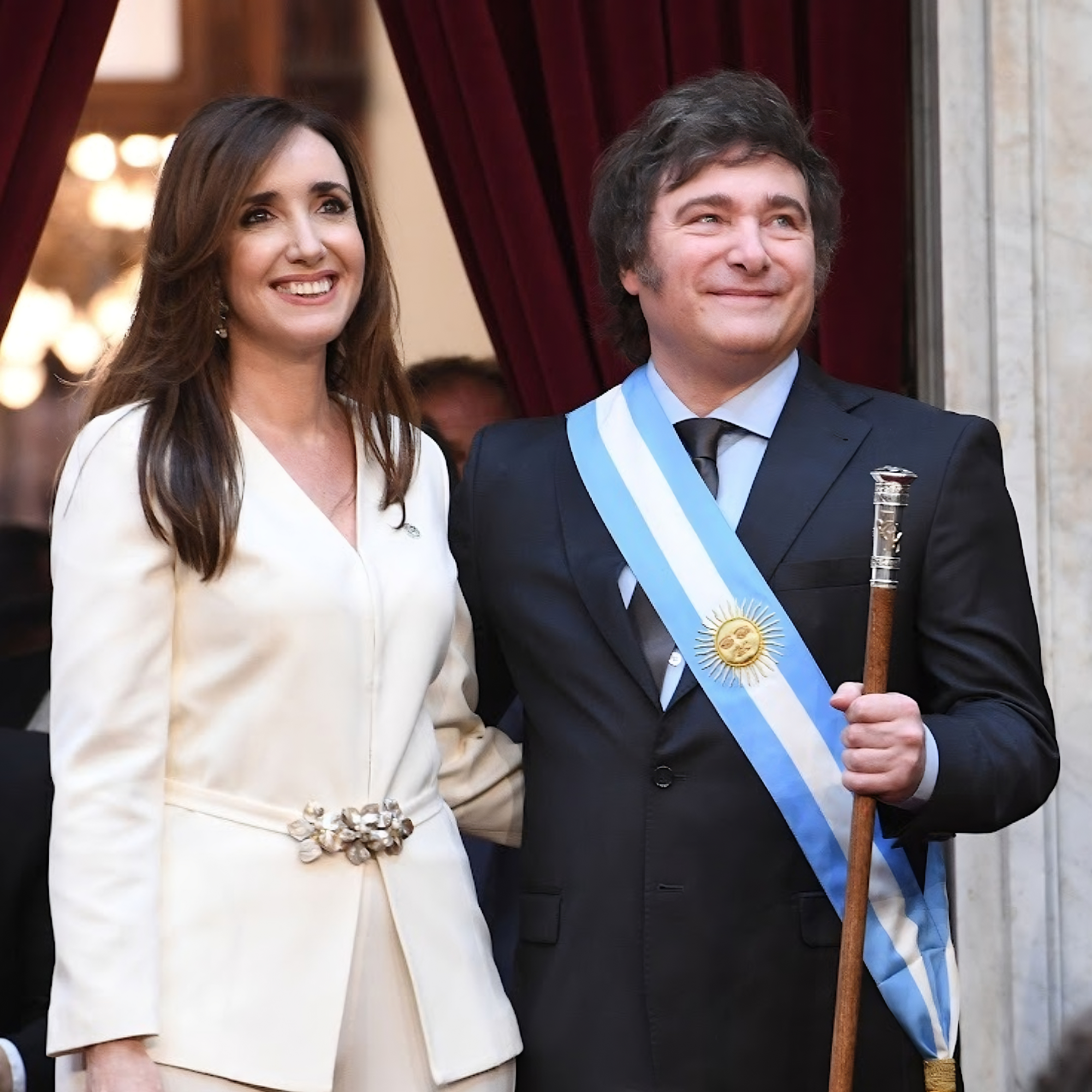
Milei and Villarruel being presented before the Argentine Senate moments after taking office

As is customary, Milei delivered a speech to the Argentine nation, warning of an economic shock, which has been described as shock therapy in economic terms, to be used as a means to fix Argentina's economic woes, with inflation rising to 200 percent. He was accompanied to Casa Rosada by his sister Karina, who also officially became the First Lady of Argentina rather than Milei's partner Fátima Flórez.

Milei opted to hold an interfaith ceremony, rather than traditional Catholic rites, in order for his spiritual advisor Rabbi Axel Wahnish to participate. During the nationally televised ceremony, Wahnish spoke directly to Milei and gave his blessings.

Following the inauguration, Milei saw his popularity increase in public opinion. After the first governmental and economic reforms taken by the president and his ministers, 53% of the Argentine people had a very good and good image of the new head of state according to a popularity poll made by Aresco on 15 December.

== Guests ==
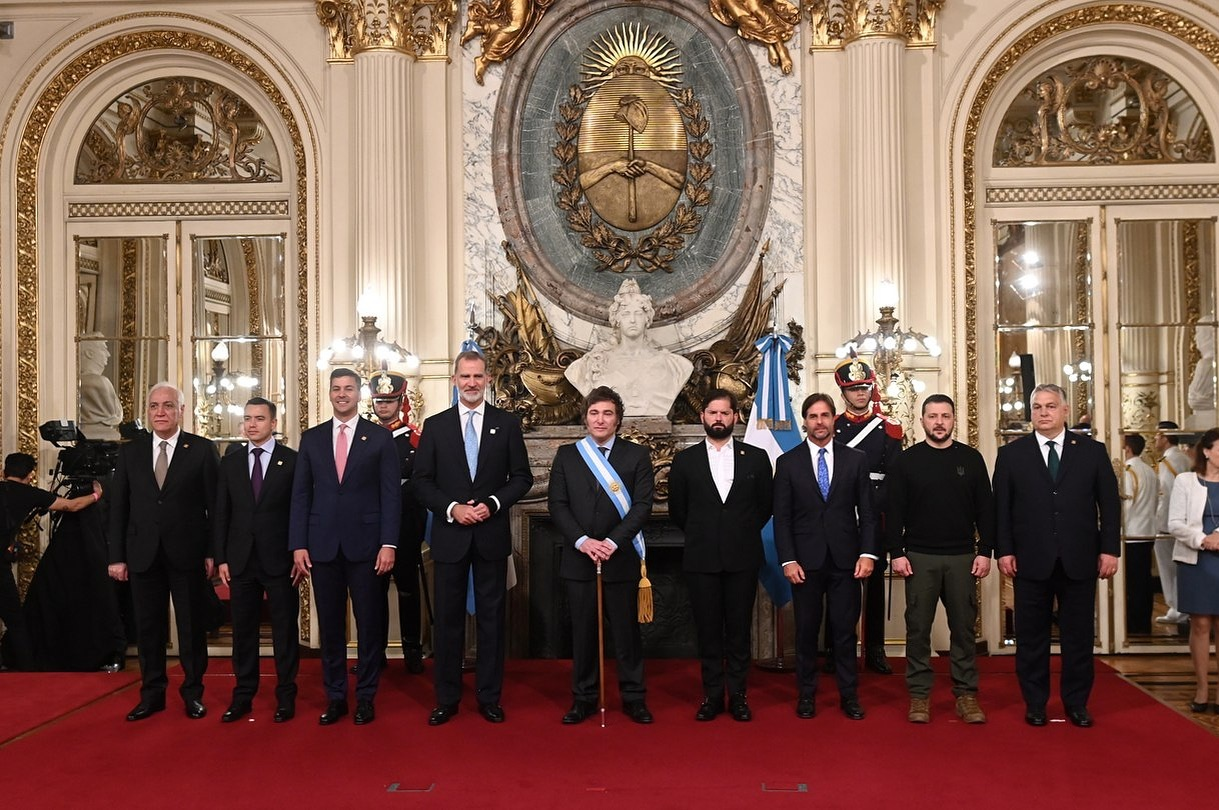
Milei with heads of state guests at Casa Rosada. From left to right: Vahagn Khachaturyan of Armenia, Daniel Noboa of Ecuador, Santiago Peña of Paraguay, Felipe VI of Spain, Javier Milei, Gabriel Boric of Chile, Luis Lacalle Pou of Uruguay as well as Viktor Orbán of Hungary and Volodymyr Zelenskyy of Ukraine

Over twenty national leaders and representatives attended Milei's inauguration. Former United States president Donald Trump indicated that he wanted to participate but did not do so for logistical reasons. Hungarian prime minister Viktor Orbán and Ukrainian president Volodymyr Zelenskyy were seen having an argument during the presentation of Milei and Villarruel before the Senate, described the following day by Zelenskyy as a "frank talk".

=== International leaders and representatives ===
Country	Leader	Status	Ref
Algeria	Ibrahim Boughali	President of the People's National Assembly	
Armenia	Vahagn Khachaturyan	President of Armenia	
Bolivia	Celinda Sosa Lunda	Minister of Foreign Affairs	
Brazil	Jair Bolsonaro	Former president of Brazil	
Brazil	Mauro Vieira	Minister of Foreign Affairs	
Chile	Gabriel Boric	President of Chile	
Chile	Alberto van Klaveren	Foreign Minister	
China	Wu Weihua	Vice Chairman of the National People's Congress Standing Committee	
Dominican Republic	José Ignacio Paliza	Administrative Minister of the Presidency	
Ecuador	Guillermo Lasso	Former president of Ecuador	
Ecuador	Daniel Noboa	President of Ecuador	
El Salvador	Gustavo Villatoro	Minister of Justice and Public Security	
France	Stanislas Guerini	Minister of Public Transformation and Service	
Honduras	Renato Florentino	Vice President of Honduras	
Hungary	Viktor Orbán	Prime Minister of Hungary	
Italy	Anna Maria Bernini	Minister of University and Research	
Israel	Eli Cohen	Minister of Foreign Affairs	
Morocco	Rachid Talbi Alami	President of the House of Representatives	
Paraguay	Santiago Peña	President of Paraguay	
Peru	Javier González Olaechea	Minister of Foreign Affairs	
Russia	Dmitry Feoktistov	Russian Ambassador to Argentina	
South Korea	Bang Ki-sun	Minister of Government Policy Coordination	
Spain	Felipe VI	King of Spain	
Ukraine	Volodymyr Zelenskyy	President of Ukraine	
Uruguay	Luis Lacalle Pou	President of Uruguay	
United Kingdom	David Rutley	Parliamentary Under-Secretary of State for Americas and Caribbean	
United States	Jennifer Granholm	United States Secretary of Energy	
United States	Carlos Monje	Under Secretary of Transportation for Policy	
United States	Marc Stanley	United States Ambassador to Argentina	

=== Other guests ===
Other dignitaries included several legislators and party leaders, mostly from the political right.

Country	Person	Status	Ref
Australia	John Ruddick	Member of the New South Wales Legislative Council	
Brazil	Eduardo Bolsonaro	Member of the Chamber of Deputies, son of Jair Bolsonaro	
Brazil	Flávio Bolsonaro	Member of the Brazilian Senate, eldest child of Jair Bolsonaro	
Brazil	Ronaldo Caiado	Governor of Goiás	
Brazil	Cláudio Castro	Governor of Rio de Janeiro	
Brazil	Tarcísio de Freitas	Governor of São Paulo	
Brazil	Jorginho Mello	Governor of Santa Catarina	
Chile	José Antonio Kast	President of the Republican Party	
Ireland	Declan Ganley	Businessman, former leader of Libertas	
Japan	Akiko Santō	Member of the Liberal Democratic Party and former president of the House of Councillors	
Japan	Hiroshi Yamauchi	Japanese ambassador to Argentina	
Mexico	Eduardo Verástegui	Prospective independent candidate in the 2024 Mexican presidential election	
Spain	Santiago Abascal	Leader of Vox	
Spain	Esperanza Aguirre	Former president of the Community of Madrid, former president of the Spanish Senate, and ex-Minister of Education, Culture and Sport	
Spain	Cayetana Álvarez de Toledo	Member of the Congress of Deputies	
Spain	Javier Ortega Smith	Vice-president of Vox	
Spain	Hermann Tertsch	Member of the European Parliament	
United States	Mark Green	Member of the United States House of Representatives	
United States	Gary Palmer	Member of the United States House of Representatives	
United States	María Elvira Salazar	Member of the United States House of Representatives	
