= Gustavo Villatoro =

Minister of Justice and Public Security of El Salvador since 2021

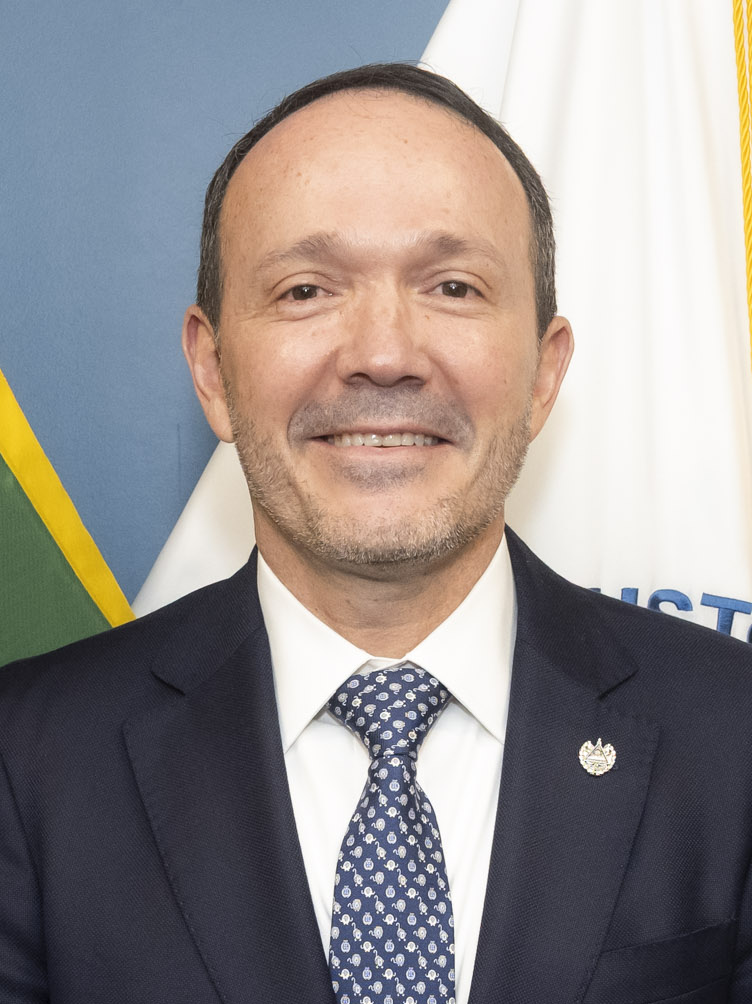
- Villatoro in 2025

8th Minister of Justice and Public Security of El Salvador
- Incumbent
- Assumed office 26 March 2021
- President: Nayib Bukele; Claudia Rodríguez (acting)
- Preceded by: Rogelio Rivas

Personal details
- Born: Héctor Gustavo Villatoro Funes El Salvador
- Education: José Matías Delgado University
- Occupation: Politician, lawyer

Héctor Gustavo Villatoro Funes is a Salvadoran politician and lawyer who has served as Minister of Justice and Public Security of El Salvador since 2021. During Villatoro's term, he has overseen the Salvadoran gang crackdown that has led to the arrests of over 85,000 alleged gang members as of 4 March 2025.

== Early life ==
Héctor Gustavo Villatoro Funes graduated from the José Matías Delgado University.

== Early career ==
From 2004 to 2009, Villatoro served as the general director of customs under President Antonio Saca. Villatoro also served as the chief prosecutor of the Organized Crime Unit. The El Faro digital newspaper has alleged that Villatoro was a political operator for Saca during his term as general director of customs from 2004 to 2009. Similarly, Revista Factum and the IBI Consultants think thank have alleged that Villatoro a political operator for Saca's brother Herbert from 2009 to 2014, paying out bribes to deputies of the Legislative Assembly in exchange for votes. Villatoro has denied these allegations.

In 2019, President Nayib Bukele appointed Villatoro as the general director of customs. In late July 2020, Bukele appointed Villatoro as the head of the Financial System Superintendence (SSF) after Nelson Fuentes resigned as Minister of Finance. That year, Villatoro was a candidate to become the country's attorney general. He promised to reduce homicides and extortion, but Raúl Melara ultimately became the attorney general. In December 2020, Villatoro ordered the country's banks to not sever ties with alleged financial criminals that were "founded in a decision of presumed culpability", an order that, according to lawyers, violated the Law Against Money Laundering and Other Assets.

== Minister of Justice and Public Security ==
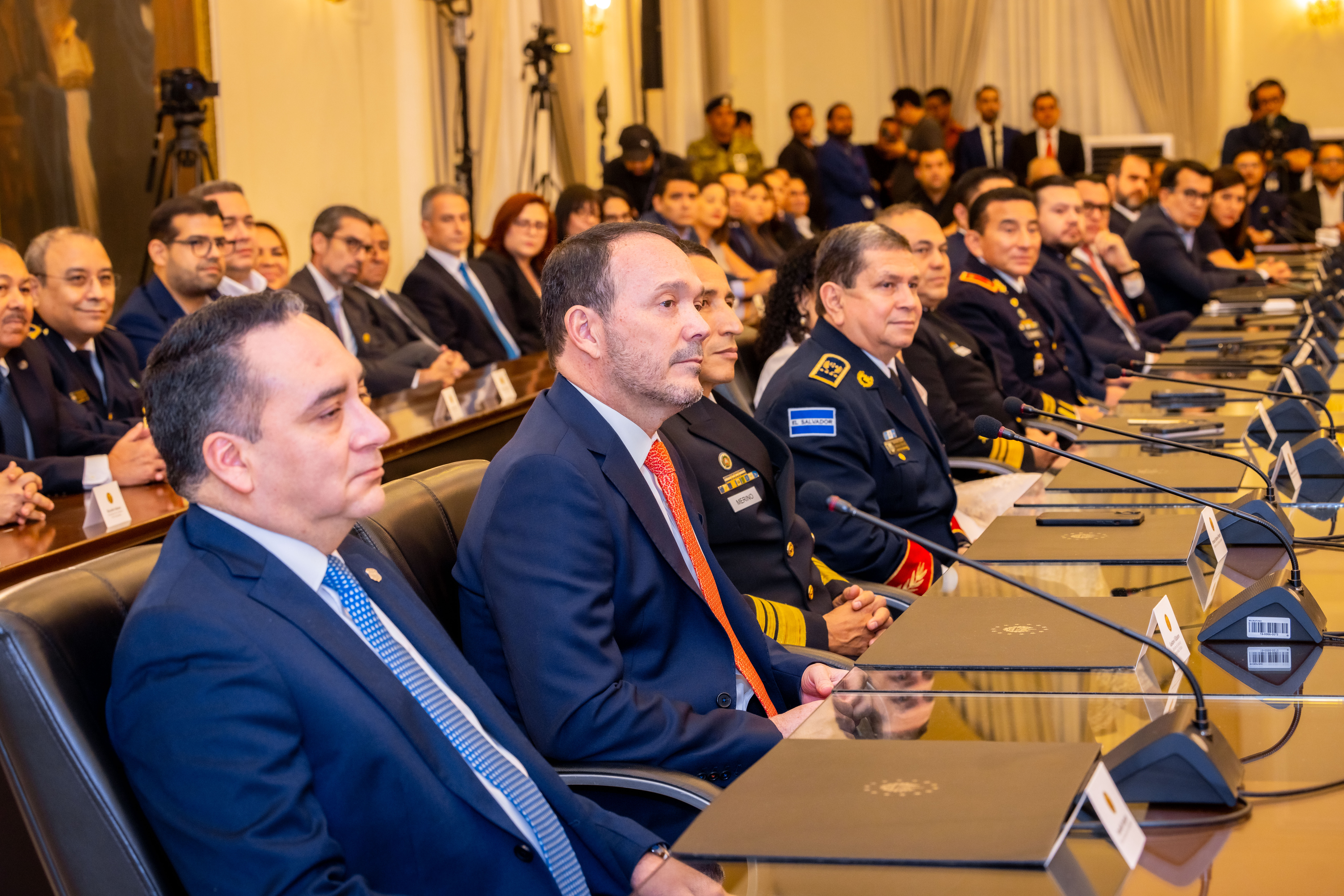
Villatoro (second from left) at a cabinet meeting in 2023

On 26 March 2021, Bukele appointed Villatoro as the country's Minister of Justice and Public Security, succeeding Rogelio Rivas. Villatoro's objective upon being appointed was "strengthening the investigative process for homicides and disappearances to reduce impunity rates". Bukele gave no reason why he replaced Rivas with Villatoro.

=== Salvadoran gang crackdown ===
On 27 March 2022, the Legislative Assembly declared a 30-day state of emergency after a spike in homicides the preceding weekend resulting in a nationwide gang crackdown. In June 2022, after almost 42,000 people had been arrested during the gang crackdown, Villatoro stated that the government aimed to arrest up to 80,000 gang members. Villatoro himself has presented proposals to extend the crackdown on multiple occasions.

In January 2024, after the Salvadoran government announced that it had recorded 153 homicides in 2023 for a rate of 2.4 homicides per 100,000 people, Villatoro praised the gang crackdown, stating that it was a "courageous decision to confront the criminal structures" and claimed that El Salvador was the second safest country in the Americas after Canada. Regarding criticism from human rights groups, Villatoro has remarked that "we have told them to go to hell". On 17 March 2026, Villatoro proposed a constitutional amendment to the Legislative Assembly to permit the imposition of life imprisonment upon individuals convicted of murder, rape, or terrorism; the amendment was approved by a 59–1 vote.

=== Meetings with foreign delegates ===
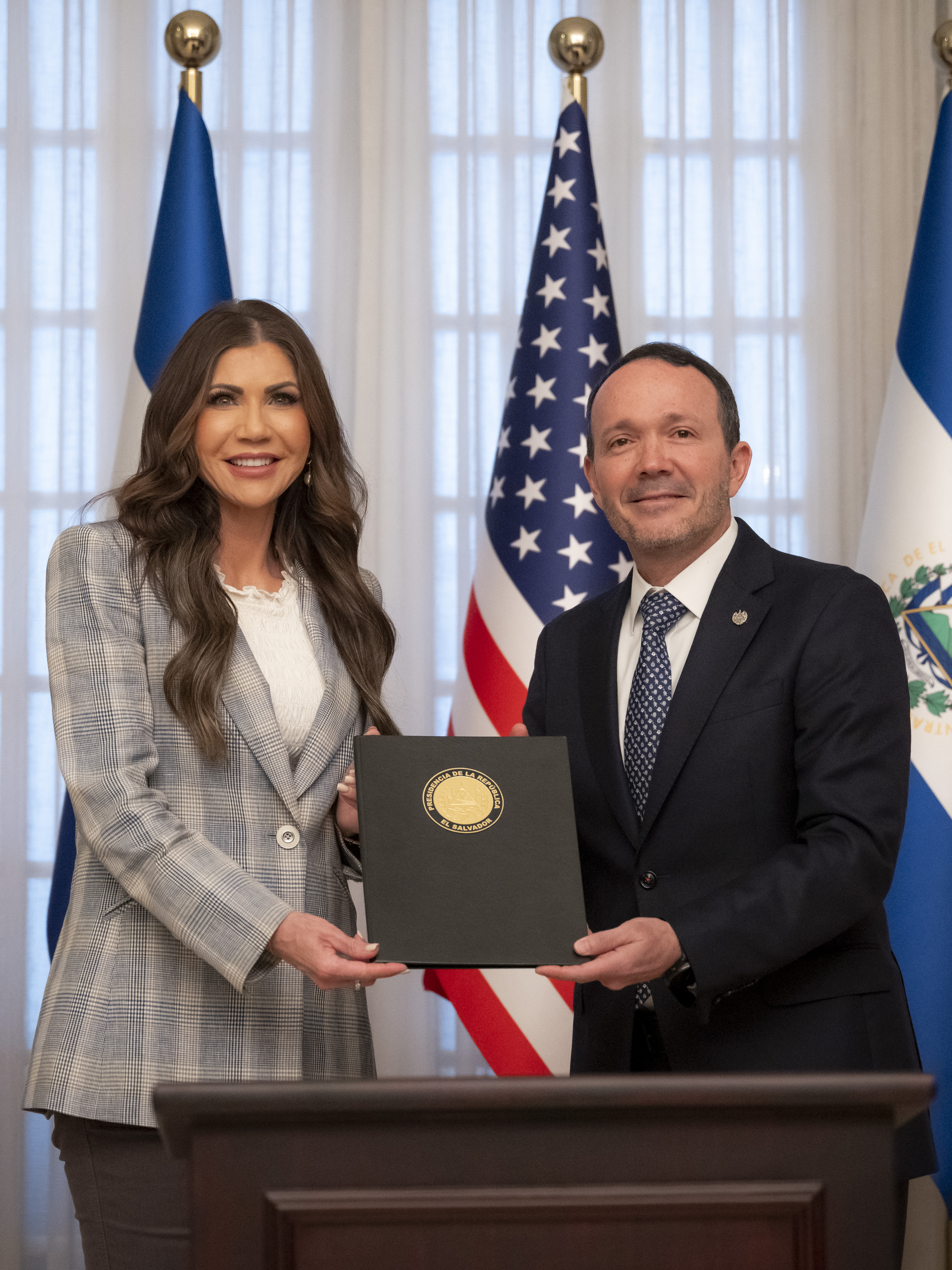
Villatoro with U.S. Secretary of Homeland Security Kristi Noem in 2025

On 9 December 2023, Villatoro met with Argentine minister of national security Patricia Bullrich in Buenos Aires. The following day, Villatoro attended the inauguration of Javier Milei in place of Bukele. On 16 June 2024, Villatoro received Bullrich in El Salvador and gave her a tour of the Terrorism Confinement Center (CECOT) maximum security prison.

Villatoro met United States secretary of homeland security Kristi Noem in March 2025. Villatoro gave Noem a tour of CECOT and signed the Security Alliance for Fugitive Enforcement Memorandum of Cooperation with the United States. The following month, Villatoro gave a similar tour of CECOT to Costa Rican minister of justice and peace Gerald Campos Valverde.

=== Criticism of journalists ===
During his tenure as Minister of Justice and Public Security, Villatoro has been critical of journalists. In September 2021, Villatoro stated that the Salvadoran government was "following" ("dando seguimiento") various journalists. In May 2022, Villatoro claimed that the La Prensa Gráfica and El Diario de Hoy newspapers were "[protecting] the interests of criminal structures" ("proteger intereses de las estructuras criminales") instead of publishing genuine news reporting. Villatoro further claimed that both newspapers were "on the side of the terrorists and their allies in the [political] opposition" ("del lado de los terroristas y sus aliados de la oposición". Human rights lawyer José Miguel Vivanco criticized Villatoro's remarks, stating that they were a "direct threat" ("amenaza directa") by Villatoro against two of El Salvador's major newspapers. Human Rights Watch similarly condemned Villatoro's remarks. Villatoro has referred to Salvadoran journalists and politicians who opposed the country's gang crackdown as "Pseudo-Salvadorans" ("Pseudo Salvadoreños").

== Personal life ==
Villatoro is a Catholic. Villatoro's father, Héctor Antonio Villatoro Benítez, is a magistrate of the First Penal Court of San Miguel.

On 23 August 2022, Villatoro received a formal recognition from the country's Attorney for the Defense of Human Rights for his security policies.

== See also ==
- Cabinet of Nayib Bukele

Political offices
Preceded by Rogelio Rivas	Minister of Justice and Public Security of El Salvador; 2021–present	Incumbent
