= Alejandro Zelaya =

Salvadoran politician

Director for El Salvador of the Central American Bank for Economic Integration
- Incumbent
- Assumed office 18 July 2023

Minister of Finance of El Salvador
- In office 28 July 2020 – 18 July 2023
- Preceded by: Nelson Fuentes
- Succeeded by: Jerson Posada

José Alejandro Zelaya Villalobo is a Salvadoran economist, current Director for El Salvador of the Central American Bank for Economic Integration, he served as Minister of Finance in the cabinet of President Nayib Bukele from 2020 to 2023.

== Education and professional background ==
Zelaya graduated with a degree in Public Accounting from the University of El Salvador in 2011. He furthered his education with a Master’s degree in Business Administration from the University of the East (UNIVO) and a Master’s in International Relations, specializing in the attraction of Foreign Direct Investment (FDI), from the Specialized Institute of Higher Education for Diplomatic Training (IEESFORD). He also holds a certification in Public Management from the Central American Institute of Public Administration (ICAP).

Prior to his ministerial appointment, his career included roles as a founding partner and director of SCI Audit Tax Advisory and Senior Auditor for Parker Randall International. In the public sector, he served as an advisor for the Government of San Salvador and a consultant for municipal finance under the PFGL project. He also acted as an expenditure auditor for the Central American Integration System (SICA).

== Government and international banking ==
Zelaya initially joined the Bukele administration as Deputy Minister of Revenue in June 2019. Following his tenure as Finance Minister, he was appointed as the Country Director for El Salvador at the Central American Bank for Economic Integration (CABEI).

In 2023, reports from Bloomberg News and Bloomberg Línea indicated that Zelaya was a lead candidate to seek the executive presidency of CABEI.

During his leadership at the bank, he coordinated the approval of the 2026 operational plan, which included over $835.8 million in financing for El Salvador to boost infrastructure and development projects. He also participated in high-level meetings between the Salvadoran presidency and the OPEC Fund for International Development to secure technical and financial support for social welfare and connectivity programs.

Zelaya has been a prominent defender of the country's Bitcoin policy. In 2022, he stated that El Salvador's "Bitcoin bet" was working and that the digital currency had brought financial inclusion and investment to the country despite market volatility. He has argued that fluctuations did not result in fiscal losses for the state as the government maintained its holdings without selling.

Political offices
Preceded by Nelson Fuentes	Minister of Finance; 2020–2023	Succeeded by Jerson Posada
