= Luz Estrella Rodríguez =

Personal details
- Occupation: Politician

Luz Estrella Rodríguez is a Salvadoran politician. He serves as El Salvador's Minister of Economy.
