= List of members of the IX Legislative Assembly of El Salvador =

Former members of the Salvadoran legislature

IX Legislative Assembly
←	VIII	X	→
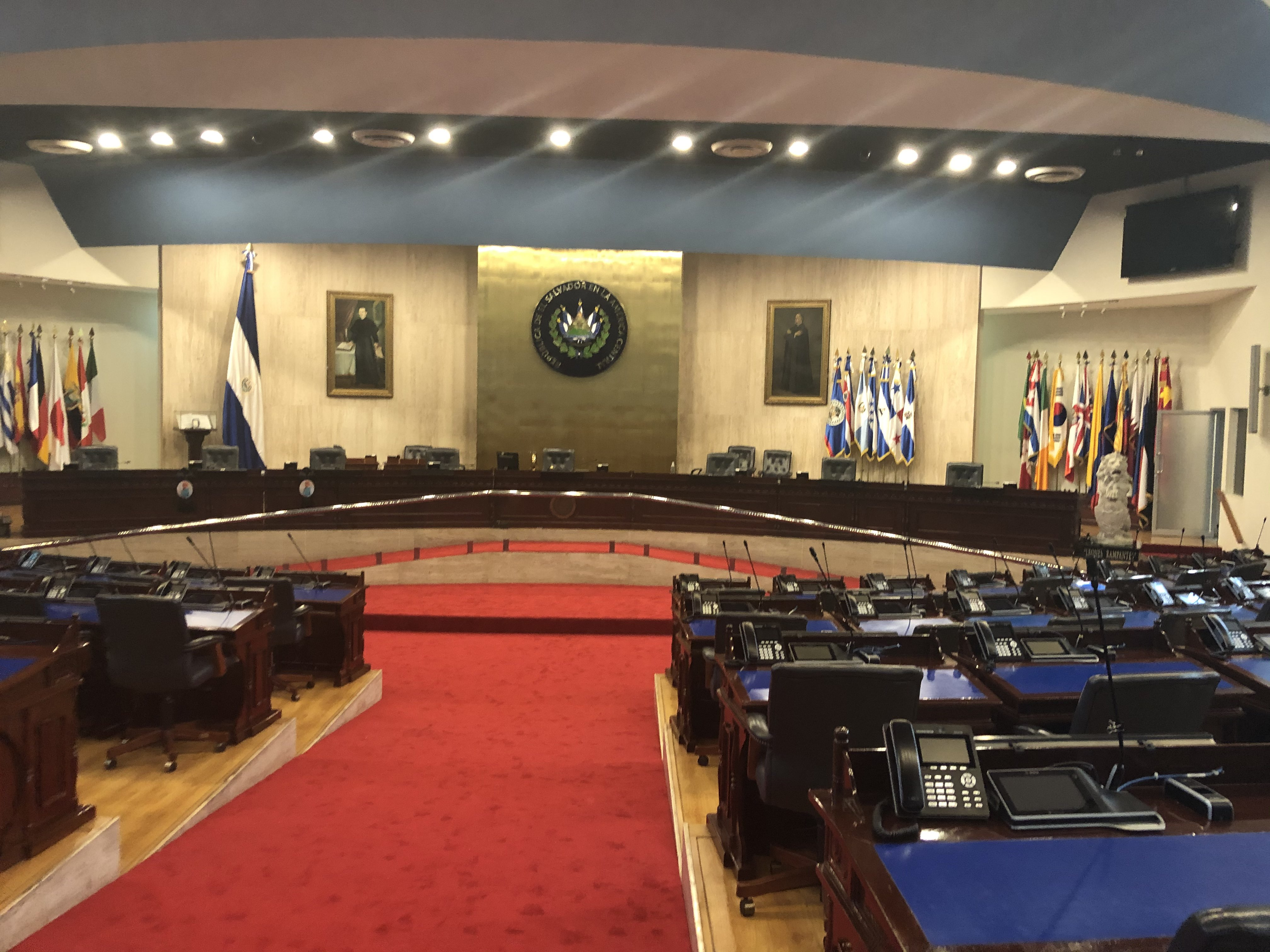
- The Blue Room of the Legislative Assembly

Overview
- Legislative body: Legislative Assembly
- Meeting place: Blue Room
- Term: 1 May 2009 – 1 May 2012
- Election: 18 January 2009
- Government: FMLN (35); PDC (5); CD (1)
- Opposition: ARENA (32); PCN (11)

Legislative Assembly
- Members: 84
- President: Ciro Cruz Zepeda Peña

The following is a list of all eighty-four (84) members of the IX Legislative Assembly of El Salvador (2009–2012). The session began on 1 May 2009 and ended on 1 May 2012.

== Composition by department ==
The following table displays the final composition of the IX Legislative Assembly.

Department	Seats	Number of deputies by party				
Department	Seats	ARENA	FMLN	PCN	PDC	CD
Ahuachapán	4	2	1	1	—N/a	—N/a
Cabañas	3	2	1	—N/a	—N/a	—N/a
Chalatenango	3	1	1	1	—N/a	—N/a
Cuscatlán	3	1	1	1	—N/a	—N/a
La Libertad	8	3	3	1	1	—N/a
La Paz	4	1	2	1	—N/a	—N/a
La Unión	4	2	1	1	—N/a	—N/a
Morazán	3	1	1	—N/a	1	—N/a
San Miguel	6	2	3	—N/a	1	—N/a
San Salvador	25	10	12	1	1	1
San Vicente	3	1	1	1	—N/a	—N/a
Santa Ana	7	2	3	1	1	—N/a
Sonsonate	6	2	3	1	—N/a	—N/a
Usulután	5	2	2	1	—N/a	—N/a
Total	84	32	35	11	5	1

== List of deputies ==
Department	Deputy	Political affiliation
Ahuachapán	Yohalmo Edmundo Cabrera Chacón	Farabundo Martí National Liberation Front
Ahuachapán	Eduardo Antonio Gomar Morán	Nationalist Republican Alliance
Ahuachapán	Carlos Walter Guzmán Coto	Nationalist Republican Alliance
Ahuachapán	José Serafín Orantes Rodríguez	National Conciliation Party
Cabañas	Antonio Echeverría Veliz	Farabundo Martí National Liberation Front
Cabañas	Carlos Armando Reyes Ramos	Nationalist Republican Alliance
Cabañas	Dolores Alberto Rivas Echeverría	Nationalist Republican Alliance
Chalatenango	José Nelson Guardado Menjívar	Nationalist Republican Alliance
Chalatenango	Reynaldo Antonio López Cardoza	National Conciliation Party
Chalatenango	Gilberto Rivera Mejía	Farabundo Martí National Liberation Front
Cuscatlán	Mario Antonio Ponce López	National Conciliation Party
Cuscatlán	Jackeline Noemí Rivera Avalos	Farabundo Martí National Liberation Front
Cuscatlán	Alberto Armando Romero Rodríguez	Nationalist Republican Alliance
La Libertad	José Orlando Arévalo Pineda	National Conciliation Party
La Libertad	Eduardo Enrique Barrientos Zepeda	Nationalist Republican Alliance
La Libertad	Roberto José d'Aubuisson Munguía	Nationalist Republican Alliance
La Libertad	Nery Arely Díaz de Rivera	Farabundo Martí National Liberation Front
La Libertad	Emma Julia Fabián Hernández	Farabundo Martí National Liberation Front
La Libertad	Guillermo Francisco Mata Bennett	Farabundo Martí National Liberation Front
La Libertad	Manuel Vicente Menjívar Esquivel	Nationalist Republican Alliance
La Libertad	Francisco José Zablah Safie	Christian Democratic Party
La Paz	Rubén Orellana	National Conciliation Party
La Paz	David Rodríguez Rivera	Farabundo Martí National Liberation Front
La Paz	Mario Alberto Tenorio Guerrero	Nationalist Republican Alliance
La Paz	Manuel Orlando Quinteros Aguilar	Farabundo Martí National Liberation Front
La Unión	Abilio Orestes Rodríguez Menjívar	Nationalist Republican Alliance
La Unión	Miguel Elías Ahues Karra	Nationalist Republican Alliance
La Unión	Santiago Flores Alfaro	Farabundo Martí National Liberation Front
La Unión	Elizardo González Lovo	National Conciliation Party
Morazán	Darío Alejandro Chicas Argueta	Farabundo Martí National Liberation Front
Morazán	Santos Guevara Ramos	Christian Democratic Party
Morazán	Guadalupe Antonio Vásquez Martínez	Nationalist Republican Alliance
San Miguel	Ricardo Bladimir González	Farabundo Martí National Liberation Front
San Miguel	Rafael Eduardo Paz Velis	Nationalist Republican Alliance
San Miguel	Gaspar Armando Portillo Benítez	Farabundo Martí National Liberation Front
San Miguel	César René Florentín Reyes Dheming	Nationalist Republican Alliance
San Miguel	Sonia Margarita Rodríguez Sigüenza	Farabundo Martí National Liberation Front
San Miguel	Sandra Marlene Salgado García	Christian Democratic Party
San Salvador	Ernesto Antonio Angulo Milla	Nationalist Republican Alliance
San Salvador	Guillermo Ávila Quehl	Nationalist Republican Alliance
San Salvador	Blanca Noemí Coto Estrada	Farabundo Martí National Liberation Front
San Salvador	Ciro Cruz Zepeda Peña	National Conciliation Party
San Salvador	Héctor Miguel Antonio Dada Hirezi	Democratic Change
San Salvador	Ana María Margarita Escobar López	Nationalist Republican Alliance
San Salvador	Carmen Elena Figueroa Rodríguez	Nationalist Republican Alliance
San Salvador	Guillermo Antonio Gallegos Navarrete	Nationalist Republican Alliance
San Salvador	Medardo González Trejo	Farabundo Martí National Liberation Front
San Salvador	Norma Fidelia Guevara de Ramirios	Farabundo Martí National Liberation Front
San Salvador	Benito Antonio Lara Fernández	Farabundo Martí National Liberation Front
San Salvador	Hugo Roger Martínez Bonilla	Farabundo Martí National Liberation Front
San Salvador	Orestes Fredesman Ortez Andrade	Farabundo Martí National Liberation Front
San Salvador	Irma Lourdes Palacios Vásquez	Farabundo Martí National Liberation Front
San Salvador	Rodolfo Antonio Parker Soto	Christian Democratic Party
San Salvador	Lorena Guadalupe Peña Mendoza	Farabundo Martí National Liberation Front
San Salvador	Mariela Peña Pinto	Nationalist Republican Alliance
San Salvador	Zoila Beatriz Quijada Solís	Farabundo Martí National Liberation Front
San Salvador	David Ernesto Reyes Molina	Nationalist Republican Alliance
San Salvador	Othon Sigfrido Reyes Morales	Farabundo Martí National Liberation Front
San Salvador	Rodrigo Samayoa Rivas	Nationalist Republican Alliance
San Salvador	Enrique Alberto Luis Valdés Soto	Nationalist Republican Alliance
San Salvador	Mario Eduardo Valiente Ortiz	Nationalist Republican Alliance
San Salvador	María Margarita Velado Puentes	Farabundo Martí National Liberation Front
San Salvador	Ana Daysi Villalobos de Cruz	Farabundo Martí National Liberation Front
San Vicente	Luis Roberto Angulo Samayoa	National Conciliation Party
San Vicente	Carlos Cortez Hernández	Farabundo Martí National Liberation Front
San Vicente	Donato Eugenio Vaquerano Rivas	Nationalist Republican Alliance
Santa Ana	Carmen Elena Calderón Sol de Escalón	Nationalist Republican Alliance
Santa Ana	Luis Alberto Corvera Rivas	Farabundo Martí National Liberation Front
Santa Ana	Nelson Napoleón García Rodríguez	Farabundo Martí National Liberation Front
Santa Ana	Francisco Roberto Lorenzana Durán	Farabundo Martí National Liberation Front
Santa Ana	Mario Marroquín Mejía	Nationalist Republican Alliance
Santa Ana	Juan Carlos Mendoza Portillo	Christian Democratic Party
Santa Ana	José Francisco Merino López	National Conciliation Party
Sonsonate	José Antonio Almendáriz Rivas	National Conciliation Party
Sonsonate	José Álvaro Cornejo Mena	Farabundo Martí National Liberation Front
Sonsonate	César Humberto García Aguilera	Nationalist Republican Alliance
Sonsonate	José Rinaldo Garzona Villeda	Nationalist Republican Alliance
Sonsonate	Guillermo Antonio Olivo Méndez	Farabundo Martí National Liberation Front
Sonsonate	Jaime Gilberto Valdez Hernández	Farabundo Martí National Liberation Front
Usulután	Erik Mira Bonilla	Nationalist Republican Alliance
Usulután	Jorge Schafik Handal Vega Silva	Farabundo Martí National Liberation Front
Usulután	José Rafael Machuca Zelaya	National Conciliation Party
Usulután	Manuel Rigoberto Soto Lazo	Nationalist Republican Alliance
Usulután	Ramón Arístides Valencia Arana	Farabundo Martí National Liberation Front

== Bibliography ==
- Supreme Electoral Court (June 2009). "Memorial Especial – Elecciones 2009" [Special Memory – 2009 Elections] (PDF). Supreme Electoral Court (in Spanish). pp. 61–63.
