= Esteban Handal Perez =

Honduran politician

Esteban José Handal Pérez (born 7 January 1965 in San Pedro Sula) is a Honduran politician and businessman who is also known as the "Red Bull." He is the former president of the Liberal Youth of Honduras and previously sought the nomination to be a Honduran presidential candidate on behalf of the Liberal Party of Honduras. He served in the national parliament of Honduras from 1997 to 2001.

== Biography ==
Esteban José Handal Pérez was born in San Pedro Sula, in the Cortés Department, Honduras.

== Education ==
Handal Pérez studied at the International School in Sampedrana in his home city. He completed his studies at the University of Texas and the Louisiana State University, graduating in industrial engineering in 1987.

== Political career ==
Shortly after his graduation from university, Handal returned to Honduras and became involved in politics, supporting the then presidential candidate of the Liberal Party, Carlos Roberto Flores, in 1989, although Roberto Flores lost to the National Party of Honduras candidate, Rafael Leonardo Callejas. Handal was elected President of the Liberal Youth of San Pedro Sula in 1989. Subsequently, he was campaign coordinator for Ramon Villeda Bermudez and in August 1993 participated in the Congress of Liberal Youth where he was elected president of the Liberal Youth, serving until 2001. In 1997 he won the nomination for Congress and was elected in the 1997 general election for the constituency of Cortes.

During his time as deputy, he emphasized always being firm with his convictions, but shortly after winning the Provincial Council, he was nominated by the Liberal Party as a presidential candidate with the "New Generation" movement. During his presidential campaign, people began calling him "the Red Bull," a nickname that is recognized throughout Honduras.

During his presidential campaign, Esteban Handal Perez revamped "the renewal of the Liberal Party of Honduras with young men and women in thought, the democratization of the Liberal Party, the rescue of the liberal principles, and the guarantee of food, health, education, employment, security, and shelter for all Hondurans," among other things.

In the internal elections of the Liberal Party on 3 December 2000, Esteban Handal Pérez, the "Red Bull", received 150,000 votes, which no were not sufficient at that time to win the nomination for the presidency by the Liberal Party. Professor Rafael Pineda Ponce lost in the general election to Ricardo Maduro Joest of the National Party. After the elections, Esteban Handal temporarily retired from politics to dedicate himself to pastoral and entrepreneurial work.

On 16 May 2010, he publicly announced in an interview with La Tribuna, a newspaper, his intention to return to national politics and run for the presidency as a Liberal. He justified his return with the sentiment that "the Honduran people need profound changes in the political system and also because I believe that there should be a greater social awareness by large majorities" Handal Pérez currently leads the Liberal Unity Movement and has publicly declared its intention to run in the presidential elections in 2012, with the intentions of "the construction of a new Honduras, with more opportunities for all, more democratic, more free, more developed, more just, and more worthy."
