= Nelson Fuentes =

Salvadoran economist and politician

Minister of Finance of El Salvador
- In office March 2018 – 28 July 2020
- President: Salvador Sánchez Cerén; Nayib Bukele
- Preceded by: Carlos Cáceres Chávez
- Succeeded by: Alejandro Zelaya

Personal details
- Born: Nelson Eduardo Fuentes Menjívar; September 29, 1978 (age 47) San Salvador, El Salvador
- Party: Grand Alliance for National Unity
- Education: Economics (Lic.)
- Alma mater: Central American University
- Occupation: Economist; Researcher

Nelson Eduardo Fuentes Menjívar is a Salvadoran economist and researcher. He served as El Salvador's Minister of Finance, first in the Cabinet of Salvador Sánchez Cerén from March 2018 to 1 June 2019, then in the Cabinet of Nayib Bukele from 1 June 2019 until his resignation on 28 July 2020.
