= List of ambassadors of Japan to Argentina =

The List of Japanese ambassadors to Argentina started when Nakamura Takashi presented his credentials to the Argentine government in 1918.

== List ==
This is a chronological list of Japanese diplomats.

| Inaugural date | Official position (Japanese) | Official position | Name (Japanese) | Name |
|---|---|---|---|---|
| July 10, 1918 | 臨時代理公使 | Chargé d'affaires ad interim | 山崎 次郎 | Yamazaki Jirō |
| December 10, 1918 | 特命全権公使 | Minister Plenipotentiary | 中村 巍 | Nakamura Takashi |
| January 8, 1921 | 臨時代理公使 | Chargé d'affaires ad interim | 山崎 次郎 | Yamazaki Jirō |
| November 17, 1921 | 特命全権公使 | Minister Plenipotentiary | 中村 巍 | Nakamura Takashi |
| December 2, 1922 | 臨時代理公使 | Chargé d'affaires ad interim | 荒井 金太 | Arai Kinta |
| January 30, 1923 | 臨時代理公使 | Chargé d'affaires ad interim | 沢田 廉三 | Sawada Renzō |
| March 18, 1924 | 特命全権公使 | Minister Plenipotentiary | 諸井 六郎 | Moroi Rokurō |
| August 29, 1925 | 臨時代理公使 | Chargé d'affaires ad interim | 坂本 龍起 | Sakamoto Tatsuki |
| October 21, 1926 | 特命全権公使 | Minister Plenipotentiary | 古谷 重綱 | Furuya Shigetsuna |
| March 21, 1928 | 臨時代理公使 | Chargé d'affaires ad interim | 越田 佐一郎 | Koshida Saichirō |
| September 24, 1928 | 特命全権公使 | Minister Plenipotentiary | 山崎 次郎 | Yamazaki Jirō |
| February 22, 1932 | 臨時代理公使 | Chargé d'affaires ad interim | 宮腰 千葉太 | Miyakoshi Chibata |
| November 14, 1932 | 特命全権公使 | Minister Plenipotentiary | 山崎 次郎 | Yamazaki Jirō |
| February 6, 1936 | 臨時代理公使 | Chargé d'affaires ad interim | 寺嶋 広文 | Terashima Hirofumi |
| December 10, 1937 | 臨時代理公使 | Chargé d'affaires ad interim | 福間 豊吉 | Fukuma Toyokichi |
| February 17, 1938 | 特命全権公使 | Minister Plenipotentiary | 内山 岩太郎 | Uchiyama Iwatarō |
| September 14, 1940 | 臨時代理公使 | Chargé d'affaires ad interim | 大森 元一郎 | Omori Genichirō |
| November 30, 1940 | 臨時代理大使 | Chargé d'affaires ad interim | 大森 元一郎 | Omori Genichirō |
| April 16, 1941 | 特命全権大使 | Ambassador | 富井 周 | Tomii Akira |
| January 26, 1944 | Second World War | | | |
| April 28, 1952 | 臨時代理大使 | Chargé d'affaires ad interim | 高木 広一 | Takagi Hiroichi |
| January 3, 1953 | 特命全権大使 | Ambassador | 大久保 利隆 | Ōkubo Toshitaka |
| September 10, 1955 | 臨時代理大使 | Chargé d'affaires ad interim | 佐藤 崎人 | Satō Sakito |
| November 23, 1955 | 特命全権大使 | Ambassador | 井上 孝治郎 | Inoue Kōjirō |
| February 8, 1958 | 臨時代理大使 | Chargé d'affaires ad interim | 深井 龍雄 | Fukai Tatsuo |
| April 2, 1958 | 特命全権大使 | Ambassador | 津田 正夫 | Tsuda Masao |
| February 15, 1963 | 臨時代理大使 | Chargé d'affaires ad interim | 瀧川 正久 | Takigawa Masahisa |
| October 7, 1963 | 特命全権大使 | Ambassador | 田中 三男 | Tanaka Mitsuo |
| January 29, 1967 | 臨時代理大使 | Chargé d'affaires ad interim | 森 純造 | Mori Shunzo |
| February 24, 1967 | 特命全権大使 | Ambassador | 河崎 一郎 | Kawasaki Ichirō |
| May 17, 1969 | 臨時代理大使 | Chargé d'affaires ad interim | 奈良 賀男 | Nara Yoshio |
| August 7, 1969 | 特命全権大使 | Ambassador | 青木 盛夫 | Aoki Morio |
| May 5, 1971 | 臨時代理大使 | Chargé d'affaires ad interim | 奈良 賀男 | Nara Yoshio |
| July 14, 1971 | 特命全権大使 | Ambassador | 服部 五郎 | Hattori Gorō |
| August 9, 1973 | 臨時代理大使 | Chargé d'affaires ad interim | 内田 園生 | Uchida Sonoo |
| September 19, 1973 | 特命全権大使 | Ambassador | 針谷 正之 | Harigai Masayuki |
| August 17, 1975 | 臨時代理大使 | Chargé d'affaires ad interim | 北村 正志 | Kitamura Masashi |
| October 3, 1975 | 特命全権大使 | Ambassador | 近藤 四郎 | Kondō Shirō |
| December 10, 1977 | 臨時代理大使 | Chargé d'affaires ad interim | 福吉 日出藏 | Fukuyoshi Hidezō |
| December 17, 1977 | 特命全権大使 | Ambassador | 大和田 涉 | Ōwada Wataru |
| June 22, 1980 | 臨時代理大使 | Chargé d'affaires ad interim | 谷口 禎一 | Taniguchi Sadakazu |
| August 30, 1980 | 特命全権大使 | Ambassador | 越智 啓介 | Ochi Keisuke |
| July 21, 1983 | 臨時代理大使 | Chargé d'affaires ad interim | 大島 弘輔 | Ōshima Hirosuke |
| September 2, 1983 | 特命全権大使 | Ambassador | 斎木 千九郎 | Saiki Senkurō |
| March 13, 1987 | 臨時代理大使 | Chargé d'affaires ad interim | 石原 重孝 | Ishihara Shigetaka |
| April 2, 1987 | 特命全権大使 | Ambassador | 山下 和夫 | Yamashita Kazuo |
| May 26, 1989 | 臨時代理大使 | Chargé d'affaires ad interim | 石原 重孝 | Ishihara Shigetaka |
| July 11, 1989 | 特命全権大使 | Ambassador | 藤本 芳男 | Fujimoto Yoshio |

== See also ==
- Argentina–Japan relations
- Diplomatic rank
