= William Jacobo Handal =

Salvadoran businessman and politician

William Handal

Minister of Finance
- In office 1 May 2006 – June 2009
- President: Antonio Saca
- Preceded by: José Guillermo López Suarez
- Succeeded by: Carlos Cáceres Chávez

Personal details
- Born: William Jacobo Handal; 31 July 1951
- Died: 2 July 2017 (aged 65) Miami
- Education: Economics
- Alma mater: Southeastern Louisiana University

William Jacobo Handal was a Salvadoran businessman and politician. He served as El Salvador's Minister of Finance from May 2006 to June 2009.

He was born on 31 July 1951. He graduated from Southeastern Louisiana University with bachelor's degree in economics in 1974. In 1975 he started a long career in TACA International Airlines SA which lasted until his appointment to Antonio Saca's cabinet. In May 2006, he was appointed as Minister of Finance.

Handal died in July 2017 in Miami.
