= Sandra Edibel Guevara Pérez =

Minister of Labor and Social Welfare of El Salvador
- In office 1 June 2014 – 1 June 2019
- President: Salvador Sánchez Cerén

Personal details
- Born: May 17, 1963 (age 63) Santa Ana, El Salvador
- Children: 3
- Education: Universidad Politécnica de El Salvador
- Occupation: Politician

Sandra Edibel Guevara Pérez is a Salvadoran politician. She serves as El Salvador's Minister of Labor and Social Welfare.
