= Carlos Cáceres Chávez =

Salvadoran politician

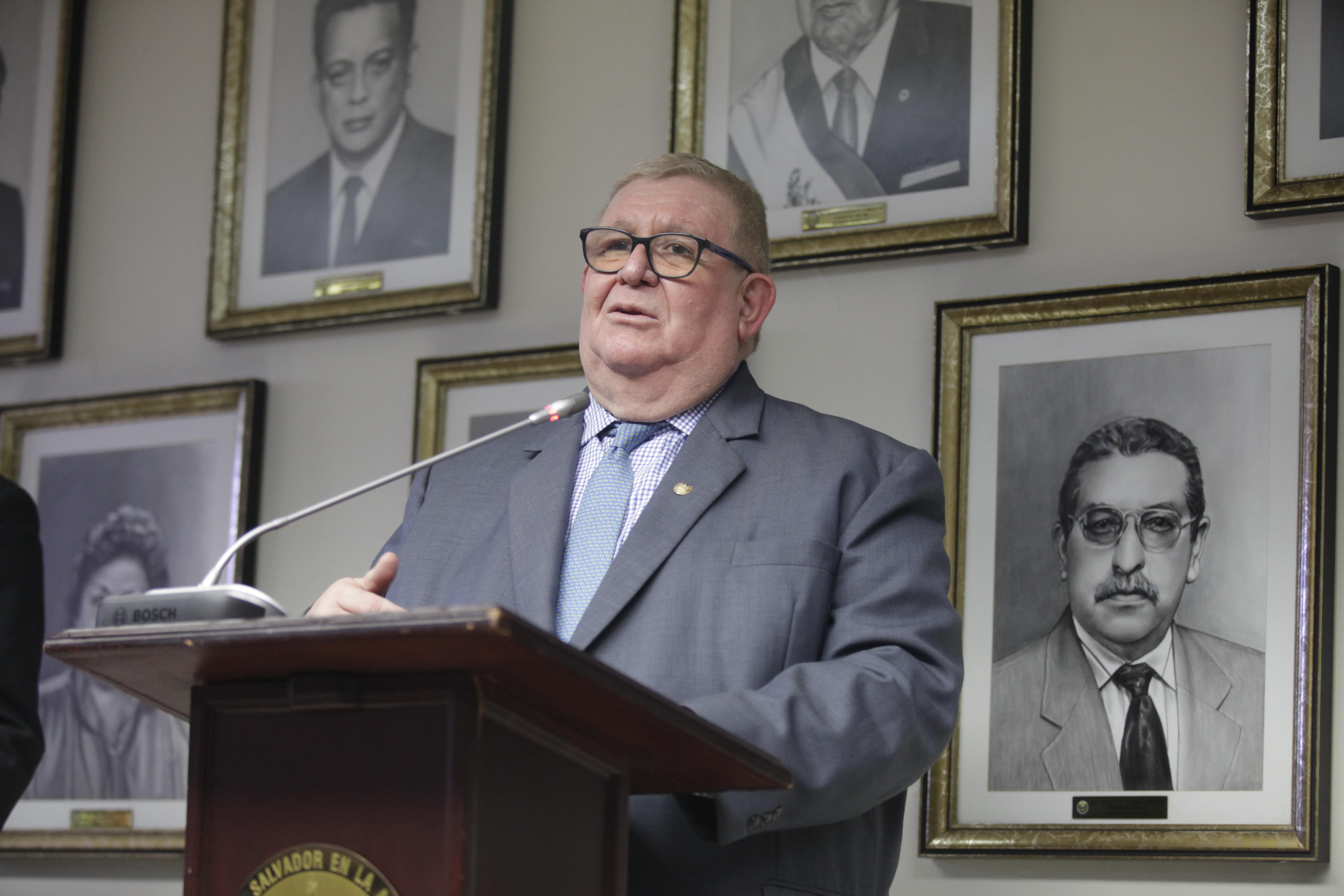

Minister of Finance
- In office June 2009 – 14 March 2018
- President: Mauricio Funes; Salvador Sánchez Cerén
- Preceded by: William Jacobo Handal
- Succeeded by: Nelson Fuentes

Personal details
- Born: Juan Ramón Carlos Enrique Cáceres Chávez; October 12, 1950 (age 75)
- Party: Farabundo Martí National Liberation Front
- Education: University of El Salvador

Juan Ramón Carlos Enrique Cáceres Chávez is a Salvadoran politician and former Minister of Finance during the administrations of Mauricio Funes and Salvador Sánchez Cerén.

Cáceres was born on 12 October 1950. He graduated as economist in 1974 from University of El Salvador. He also has a master's degree in administration from Katholieke Universiteit Leuven (KU Leuven), Belgium. He was executive director and president of Banco Internacional 1980–1982. He worked as stock broker agent from 1992 to 1998. He was executive director of the Salvadoran Banking Association ABANSA from 2006 to 2008.

He served as El Salvador's Minister of Finance during FMLN administrations from June 2009 until 14 March 2018.

In June 2018, he was appointed by Salvador Sánchez Cerén as ambassador to Mexico. Nayib Bukele replaced him in August 2020. In 2021, he was accused of committing the crimes of illicit enrichment.
