= Ministry of Finance (El Salvador) =

Government ministry of El Salvador

Ministry of Finance of El Salvador
- Ministerio de Hacienda
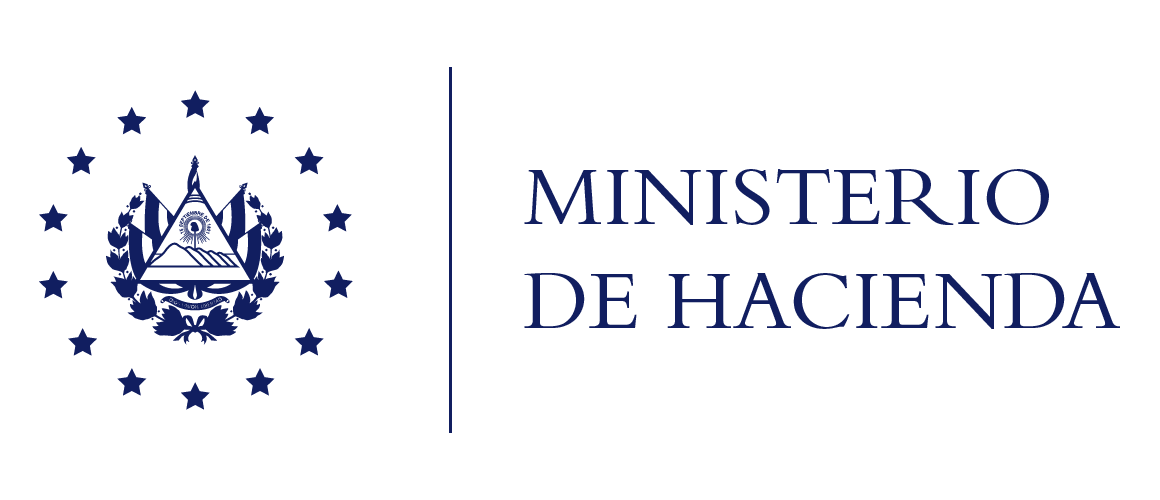

Agency overview
- Formed: February 1829
- Jurisdiction: Government of El Salvador
- Headquarters: Boulevard de Los Héroes No. 1231, San Salvador
- Agency executive: Jerson Posada, Minister
- Website: Official website

The Ministry of Finance (Spanish: Ministerio de Hacienda) of El Salvador is the government ministry of El Salvador in charge of directing the fiscal policy on public resources, so that it promotes stability and sustainability of public finances.

== History ==
The ministry was first created in 1829. It was later reorganized and merged with ministry of economy. Separate ministry of finance was recreated in 1950.

== Ministers of Finance before 1950 ==
- Manuel Barberena, 1829–1830
- Joaquín Durán y Aguilar, 1830–1833
- Juan José Córdova, 1833–1834
- Antonio José Cañas, 1838–1839
- Nicolás Espinoza, 1840–1841
- José Miguel Montoya, 1841
- Enrique Nuila, 1841–?
- Antonio José Cañas, 1842
- José María San Martín, 1846–1847
- Gregorio Arbizú, 1854-1855
- José Campo y Pomar, 1856
- José María San Martín, 1856
- Cayetano Bosque, 1858
- José Trinidad Cabañas, 1858-1859
- Eugenio Aguilar, 1861-1863
- Juan Delgado, 1863-?
- J. J. Bonilla, ?-1872–?
- Maximo Araujo, ?-1874-?
- Dositeo Fiallos, 1876
- Fabio Morán, 1876-?
- Domingo López, 1885
- Jacinto Castellanos, 1885-?
- Reyes Arrieta Rossi, 1890-?
- Rafael Guirola Duke, 1892–1894
- Cornelio Lemus, 1894-?
- Fidel Novoa Meléndez, 1898-?
- Samuel Luna, 1903-?
- Federico Mejía, 1907-?
- Rafael Guirola Duke, 1911–1913
- Alfonso Quiñónez Molina, 1913–1914
- Samuel Luna, 1914-1915
- Tomás García Palomo, 1915-?
- José Esperanza Suay, 1919–1922
- Reyes Arrieta Rossi, 1922
- Calixto Velado, 1923
- Gustavo Vides, 1923–1927
- Francisco José Espinoza, 1931-?
- Reyes Arrieta Rossi, ?–1932
- Miguel Tomás Molina, 1932–1933
- Carlos Menéndez Castro–1939–?
- Héctor Escobar Serrano, 1944
- Lisandro Villalobos, 1944-?

== Ministers of Finance after 1950 ==
- Enrique A. Porras, 1950–1956
- Humberto Costa, 1956-1959
- Ricardo Arbizú Bosque, 1960–1961
- Ernesto Núñez, 1961–1962
- Humberto Bernal, 1962
- Álvaro Marino, 1963–1967
- Humberto Guillermo Cuestas, 1967–1968
- Ricardo Arbizu Bosque, 1968–1970
- Amado Gavidia Hidalgo, 1970–1974
- Rigoberto Antonio Martínez Renderos, 1974–1976
- René López Bertrand, 1977–1978
- Ernesto Arbizu Mata, ?–1979
- Roberto Alvergue Vides, 1979–1980
- Jorge Eduardo Tenorio, 1981–1983
- Ricardo J. López, 1984–1989
- Rafael Alvarado Cano, 1989–1992
- Edwin Sagrera, 1993–1995
- Manuel Enrique Hinds, 1995–1999
- José Luis Trigueros Gómez, 1999–2001
- Juan José Daboub, 2001–2004
- José Guillermo López Suarez, 2004–2006
- William Jacobo Handal, 2006–2009
- Carlos Cáceres Chávez, 2009–2018
- Nelson Fuentes, 2018–2020
- Alejandro Zelaya, 2020–2023
- Jerson Posada, 2023–present

== See also ==
- Economy of El Salvador
- Central Reserve Bank of El Salvador
