= Ministry of Justice and Public Security (El Salvador) =

Government ministry of El Salvador

- Ministerio de Justicia y Seguridad Pública
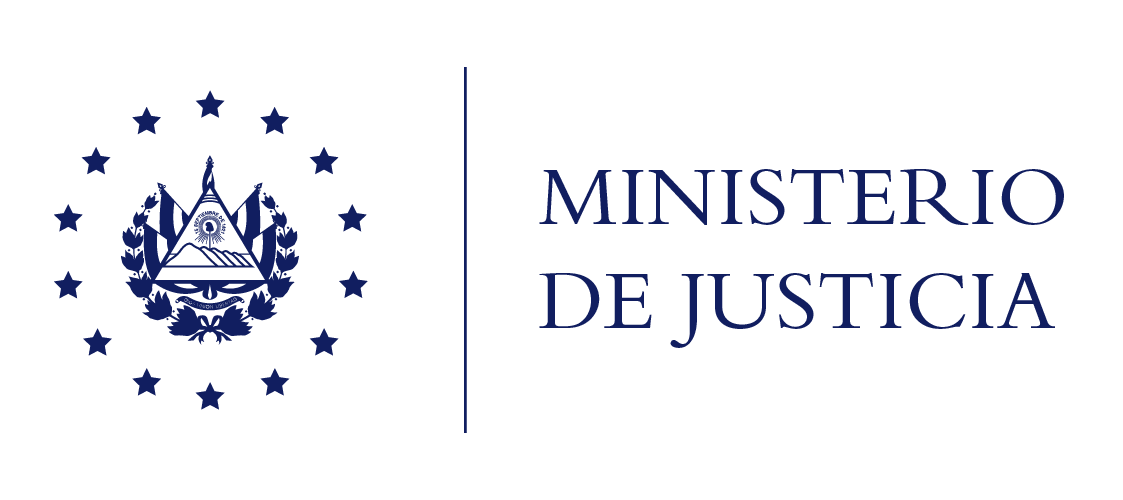

Ministry overview
- Formed: 2006; 19 years ago
- Jurisdiction: El Salvador
- Headquarters: Alameda Juan Pablo II and 17 Avenida Norte, San Salvador, El Salvador
- Minister responsible: Gustavo Villatoro
- Website: www.seguridad.gob.sv

The Ministry of Justice and Public Security of El Salvador (Spanish: Ministerio de Justicia y Seguridad Pública de El Salvador, abbreviated MJSP) is a government ministry of El Salvador.

== History ==
The Ministry of Justice and Public Security was established on 5 December 2006 by the Salvadoran government. The ministry began its functions the following year.

== Structure ==
The ministry is led by the Minister of Justice and Public Security. The Vice Minister of Justice and Vice Minister of Security serve under the Minister of Justice and Public Security. The National Civil Police (PNC), the National Academy of Public Security (ANSP), and the General Directorate of Penal Centers (DGCP) are administered by the Ministry of Justice and Public Security.

== List of ministers of justice and public security ==
| Minister | | Assumed office | Left office | President | Ref. |
|---|---|---|---|---|---|
| 1 | René Mario Figueroa Figueroa | 5 December 2006 | 1 June 2009 | Antonio Saca | |
| 2 | José Manuel Melgar Henríquez | 1 June 2009 | 23 November 2011 | Mauricio Funes | |
| 3 | David Victoriano Munguía Payés | 23 November 2011 | 17 May 2013 | Mauricio Funes | |
| 4 | José Ricardo Perdomo Aguilar | 17 May 2013 | 1 June 2014 | Mauricio Funes | |
| 5 | Benito Antonio Lara Fernández | 1 June 2014 | 22 January 2016 | Salvador Sánchez Cerén | |
| 6 | Mauricio Ernesto Ramírez Landaverde | 22 January 2016 | 1 June 2019 | Salvador Sánchez Cerén | |
| 7 | Rogelio Eduardo Rivas Polanco | 1 June 2019 | 26 March 2021 | Nayib Bukele | |
| 8 | Héctor Gustavo Villatoro Funes | 26 March 2021 | Incumbent | Nayib Bukele | |
