= Blockade of the Cabañas Department =

Salvadoran military operation

Blockade of Cabañas
- Part of the Salvadoran gang crackdown
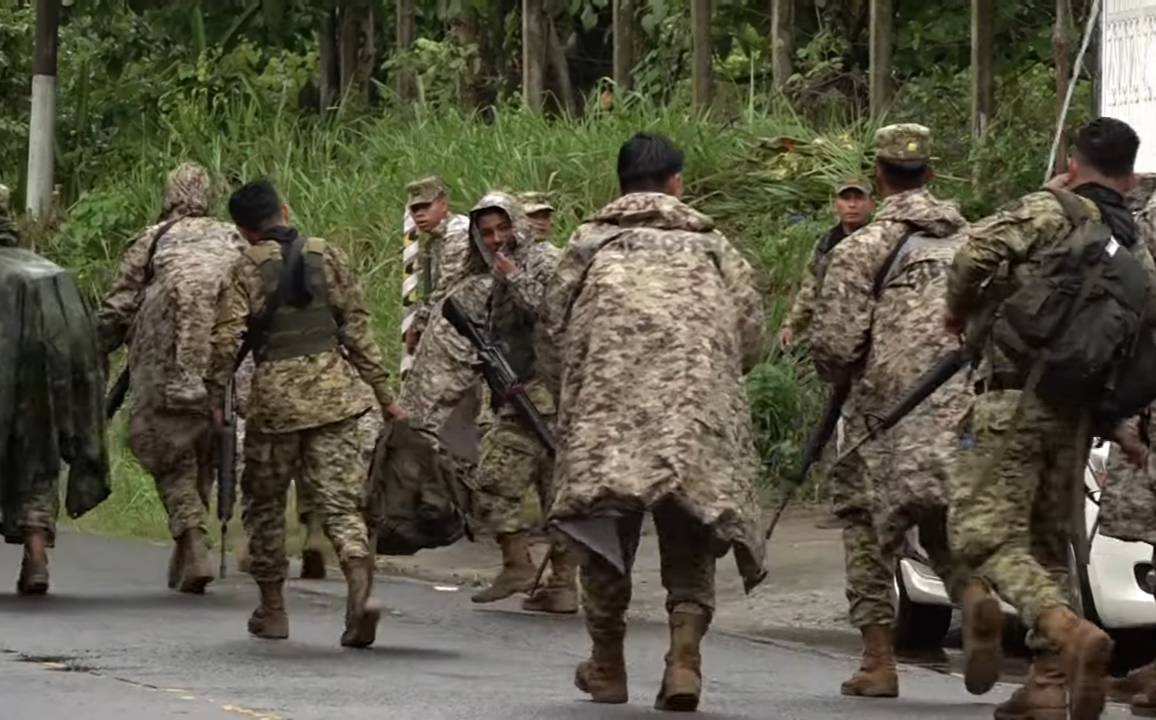
- Salvadoran Army troops in the surroundings of the department
- Date: 1 August 2023 – 1 January 2024 (5 months)
- Location: Cabañas Department

Parties
Salvadoran government: Salvadoran Army; National Civil Police	Criminal gangs: MS-13; Barrio 18

Lead figures
Nayib Bukele; René Merino Monroy; Mauricio Arriaza; Gustavo Villatoro	No centralized leadership

Number
7,000 soldiers 1,000 police officers	Unknown

Casualties and losses
None	298 suspected gang members captured 2 gang members killed 50+firearms recovered along with ammunition and explosives 56 vehicles recovered 12 phones recovered $760 cash seized Unspecified quantities of drugs confiscated

The blockade of the Cabañas Department (Spanish: Cerco Cabañas) was a military operation in El Salvador during the Salvadoran gang crackdown which started on 1 August 2023, when Salvadoran President Nayib Bukele announced that 7,000 soldiers of the Armed Forces of El Salvador (FAES) and 1,000 police officers of the National Civil Police (PNC) had surrounded the department of Cabañas to capture gang members.

== Background ==
Due to a huge rise in murders of the country, the government of El Salvador declared a state of emergency in March 2022. By August 2023, a total of 72,000 suspected gang members had been arrested.

The blockade was the fifth operation of its kind in the country. Previously, in October 2022, Comasagua became the first area to be blockaded by security forces after the murder of a resident. In December 2022, the municipality of Soyapango inside the San Salvador Department was besieged by 8,500 soldiers and 1,500 police officers during the blockade of Soyapango after the announcement of the fifth phase of Bukele's "Territorial Control Plan". In the same month La Granjita and Tutunichapa were also fenced off to hunt for drug traffickers. In January 2023, a highway in Santa Ana was surrounded by the army after people complained of an increase in crime. Later, in May 2023, the city of Nueva Concepción was encircled by 5,000 soldiers and 500 police officers during the blockade of Nueva Concepción to hunt for gang members after the killing of a police officer. The fifth phase of the Territorial Control Plan entailed establishing circles around communities, especially large cities, in order to block the escape of gang members and to capture them.

Cabañas has a population of over 160,000 people and covers a land area of 1,000 square kilometres (390 sq mi).

While announcing the beginning of the blockade, president Nayib Bukele had claimed that gang members from Mara Salvatrucha (MS-13) and the 18th Street gang (Barrio 18) had fled to Cabañas for refuge from the crackdown in recent weeks. Later, during the blockade, Minister of National Defense René Merino Monroy stated that the government of El Salvador had intelligence related to gang members fleeing to Cabañas and that the attack in July on the National Civil Police (PNC) prompted the government to launch an operation to capture the members.

== Blockade ==
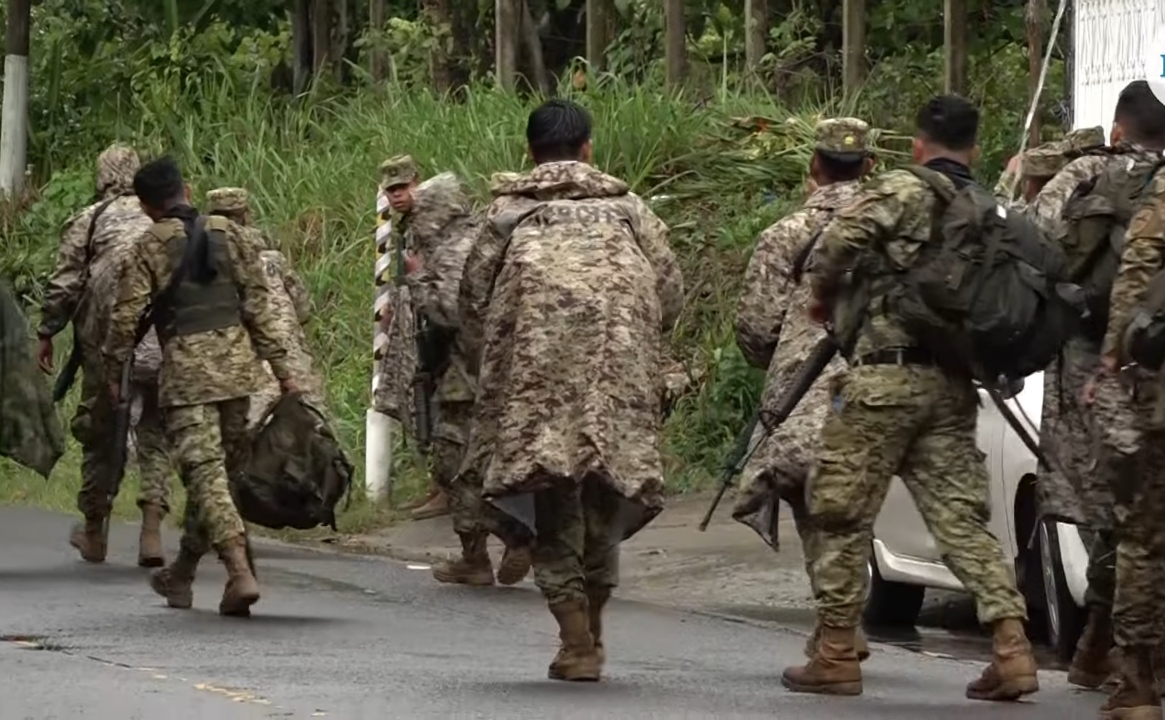
Military walking through Cabañas

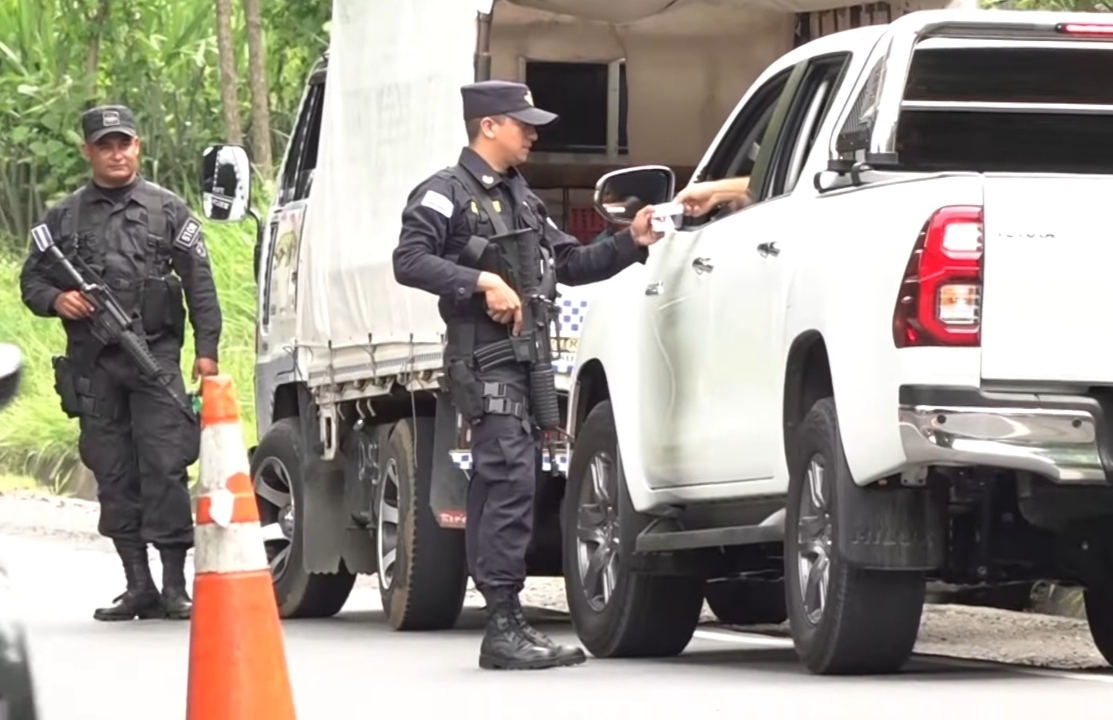
Officers checking verification documents from a driver

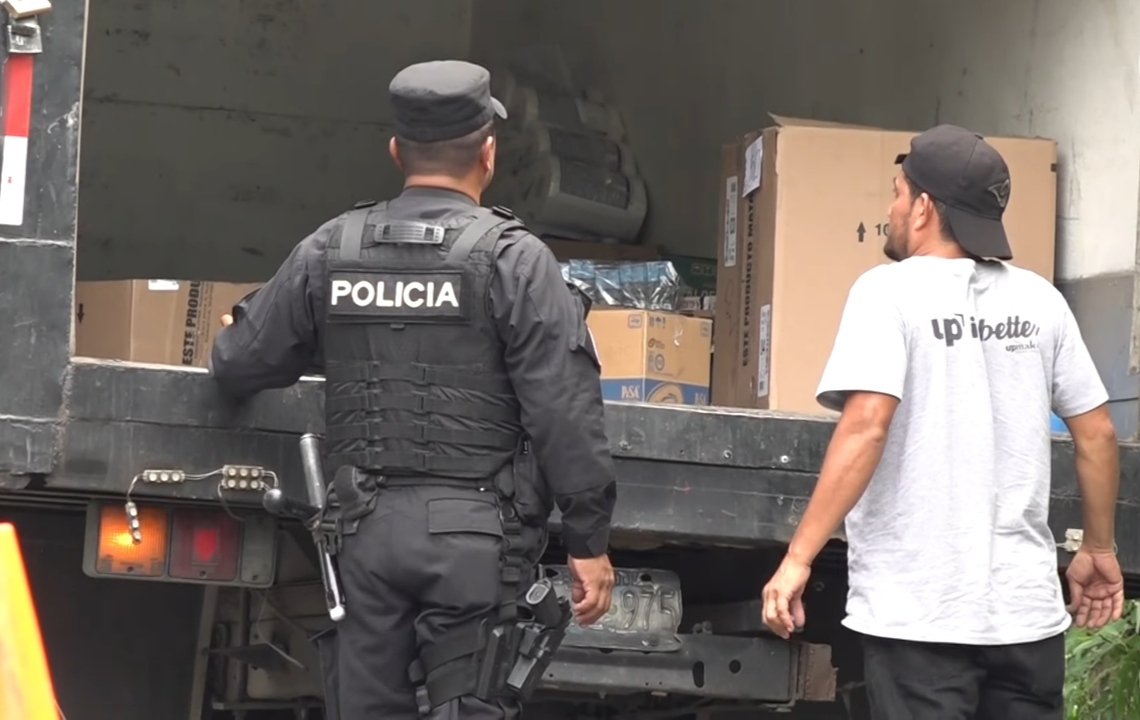
Police officer searching a truck in Cabañas

On 30 July 2023, two police officers were injured in an ambush by alleged gang members in the Maquilishuat canton of Ilobasco. One of them was seriously injured and both of them were flown to San Salvador. A video of the ambush was uploaded to Twitter by the Salvadoran Minister of Defense René Merino Monroy. The National Civil Police (PNC) reported that an operation to hunt for the attackers was underway.

On 1 August 2023, Salvadoran President Nayib Bukele wrote on Twitter that the government had mobilized 7,000 soldiers of the Armed Forces of El Salvador (FAES) and 1,000 police officers of the PNC to surround the department of Cabañas and capture gang members. In the tweet, Bukele stated that the government's forces will "prevent gang members from leaving the area and cut off all supply lines belonging to terrorist groups" and that the operation would continue until "the operatives can extract all gang members". Bukele claimed that gang members of Mara Salvatrucha (MS-13) and the 18th Street Gang (Barrio 18) had fled to Cabañas for refuge from the crackdown.

The blockade is the fifth such operation conducted by the Salvadoran government since the beginning of the gang crackdown and the first one to cover an entire department.

On 2 August 2023, Mara Salvatrucha members were reported to have been arrested, with one of them having a prior history of possessing illegal firearms, criminal association and sexual harassment, as well as having been accused of arranging firearms and soldiers in the Maquilishuat canton. A member of 18th Street gang with several tattoos related to gang membership was also arrested in Ilobasco while trying to hide inside a septic tank. In the evening, Mauricio Arriaza Chicas, the Director General of the PNC, stated that 12 to 15 suspected gang members had been captured. Vehicle checkpoints had been set up on all roads inside the department and all the municipalities within the department were subject to regular military and police patrols.

At around midnight, a team of soldiers and police officers patrolling near the Güiscoyol hill in Sensuntepeque and close to border of Chalatenango were involved in a gunfight with a group of alleged gang members which resulted in the death of a high ranking local gangster. Hours after the incident, Merino Monroy and Arriaza both arrived at the spot to confirm the incident. Chicas later stated that the killed attacker was the third in command of the local armed MS-13 structure and warned that the Salvadoran forces would retaliate with adequate force against criminals trying to attack or resist the army or the police.

On 4 August, elements of the Salvadoran Army and the PNC searched for gang members Caserío El Picacho, Cerro La Montaña, Caserío Santa Cruz and Caserío El Salamo, who were suspected of hiding within the municipality of Sensuntepeque, Cabañas. Communication equipment was delivered to PNC units involved in the blockade.

A 9mm pistol was recovered by the army along with a 22-caliber rifle in the Potrero Cubias canton, San Isidro. Three abandoned 22-caliber rifles were also recovered in the canton of El Jocote, Ciudad Dolores.The weapons were handed over the PNC. The army tweeted about the capture of a MS-13 member in the Quesera canton of Ilobasco who had previously been deported from the United States in 2019 after an attempted murder. Information about an MS-13 member held in San Isidro with a criminal history of aggravated robbery and illegal association and another member who was captured in Barrio El Centro, Tejutepeque was also tweeted about. Two members of the 18th Street Gang, one of whom had an active arrest warrant for an attempted murder, were also detained in San Lorenzo, Sensuntepeque.

On 5 August, La Pagina reported that several gang members were trying to escape from the besieged department to the hilly municipalities of Nombre de Jesús and San Antonio de La Cruz, inside Chalatenango, with some trying to cross over to Honduras. Unmanned aerial vehicle patrols were carried out throughout the department. La Prensa Gráfica reported that 18 suspected gang members, including 2 minors and 3 women, had been detained at the police station in Sensuntepeque. Later, 2 heavily armed MS-13 members, aged 33 and 18, were also captured while trying to flee to Chalatenango. One of them was the second in command of the local MS armed group.

On 8 August, government sources indicated that the blockade had led to the capture of 52 suspected gang members, along with 21 firearms, a grenade and an improvised weapon. Later, the Director General of the PNC stated that 54 gang members had been captured, including 16 local leaders who were responsible for coordinating criminal activities inside the department. He also confirmed that 24 M-16 and AK-47 rifles along with ammunition and grenades were found, adding that those arrested would be tried together. Two of the gang members who were caught on their way to Chalatenango gave up information leading to arrests of four other gang members. The police chief also confirmed that some gang members had once again tried to cross over to Honduras, saying that they had been caught near the municipalities of Victoria and Dolores in Cabañas. While talking to Canal 41, Merino also reported that the blockade had led to the arrests of 56 suspected members. He also said that out of the 56 people captured, 26 were from Mara Salvatrucha while 15 of them were from the 18th Street Gang, with the rest being generic criminals.

On 9 August, Chicas held a meeting with senior officers of the PNC and the Salvadoran Armed Forces to review the situation in Cabañas.

The Salvadoran government continued to report about the capture of more arms and gang members in the department. On 11 August, the PNC tweeted that a gang member had been killed after firing at an elite unit of the PNC in the canton of Río Grande inside Sensuntepeque.

On 7 September, the government claimed that 211 gang members (77 in Ilobasco, 38 in Sensuntepeque, 9 in Guacotecti, 15 in San Isidro, 14 in Victoria, 6 in Dolores, 13 in Tejutepeque, 3 in Jutiapa and 36 from other departments) had been captured in the operation.

By 13 September, the number of captured gang members rose to more than 260. Arriaza Chicas further claimed that the government had seized 12 phones and $760 in cash, along with 37 firearms and 56 vehicles allegedly used by gang members. Later, on 26 September, Merino claimed that the authorities had captured 298 gang members and more than 50 firearms as a result of the blockade. The government continued to report more weapon seizures in the department, with a buried revolver being discovered on 26 October. Further seizures were also reported in the month of December.

== Reactions ==
The blockade was supported by many residents of Cabañas, while survivors of the Salvadoran Civil War living in the Santa Marta area were unhappy with the heavy deployment of military forces. The Salvadoran organization Foro Nacional de la Salud (FNS) criticized the actions of the government, saying that the blockade could lead to anxiety within the local population and restricted their rights, while clarifying that they were not against capturing gang members, but could not support any extreme measures. The measures were criticized by Cristosal, a non governmental organization which has been critical of the Salvadoran gang crackdown.

== See also ==
- Blockade of Nueva Concepción
- Blockade of southern Chalatenango
- Blockade of Soyapango
