= Blockade of southern Chalatenango =

Blockade of the Salvadoran gang crackdown

- Part of the Salvadoran gang crackdown
- Date: 24 March 2024 – present
- Location: Southern Chalatenango Department: Potonico; San Antonio Los Ranchos; San José Cancasque; San Isidro Labrador
- Status: Ongoing

Parties
Salvadoran government: Salvadoran Army; National Civil Police	Criminal gangs: 18th Street gang; 18 Sureños clique

Lead figures
Nayib Bukele; René Merino Monroy; Mauricio Arriaza	Uncentralized leadership

Number
5,000 soldiers 1,000 police officers	Unknown

Casualties
- Arrested: 50 (as of 2 April 2024)

The blockade of southern Chalatenango began on 24 March 2024 when Salvadoran President Nayib Bukele ordered 5,000 soldiers and 1,000 police officers to blockade and enter the four municipalities in southern Chalatenango. The blockade is the second to be implemented in the Chalatenango Department after the blockade of Nueva Concepción which began in May 2023. The blockade aims to dismantle the 18 Sureños clique of the 18th Street gang.

== Background ==
On 27 March 2022, the Legislative Assembly of El Salvador voted to implement a state of emergency after criminal gangs in El Salvador killed 87 people over the course of one weekend. The vote began the Salvadoran gang crackdown which up to 24 March 2024 had resulted in the arrests of over 78,100 people with suspected gang affiliations. In late-2022 and throughout 2023, the Salvadoran government implemented blockades of parts of the country where gang presence remained high after the crackdown initially began. On 17 May 2023, the Salvadoran Army and the National Civil Police initiate a blockade of Nueva Concepción, a municipality of the Chalatenango Department in northern El Salvador.

== Blockade ==
On 18 March 2024, a homicide was reported to the National Civil Police in San José Cancasque. A few days later on 22 March, a second homicide was reported in the city of Chalatenango. The homicides were linked to the 18 Sureños gang, and the alleged assailants of the two homicides were captured by the National Civil Police by 24 March. The police also recovered the two shotguns allegedly used in the homicides. Radio YSUCA reported that residents in southern Chalatenango noticed an increased military presence following the homicides, and some claimed that the government was going to implement a blockade.

On 24 March, Salvadoran President Nayib Bukele announced on X the beginning of a blockade in the southern Chalatenango municipalities of Potonico, San Antonio Los Ranchos, San José Cancasque, and San Isidro Labrador due to the two homicides committed in the days prior. Bukele stated that the goal of the blockade was to dismantle 18 Sureños gang, a clique of the 18th Street gang. A total of 5,000 soldiers and 1,000 police officers were mobilized to blockade the municipalities and arrest gang members. Bukele included a video in his post, in which, the two arrested suspects were shown in front of columns of soldiers.

== Reactions ==
Bukele ended his announcement by stating that "we will not stop until we eradicate what little remains of the gangs" ("no nos vamos a detener hasta erradicar lo poco que aún queda de las pandillas"). Minister of National Defense René Merino Monroy wrote on X that "we will clean the zone completely, we will extract up to the final remnants of the gangs" ("limpiaremos por completo la zona, vamos a extraer hasta el último remanente de pandillas"). Director of the National Civil Police Mauricio Arriaza Chicas stated that the blockade's objective was to "eradicate the 18S clique which commits crime in the zone" ("erradicar la clica de 18S que delinque en la zona").

Cristosal, a Salvadoran human rights non-governmental organization, asked the military and the police to respect the rights of residents "forced to open their houses" ("obligados a abrir sus casas") in order to search for gang members, and to respect the rights of individuals arrested. Cristosal claimed that the security forces were engaging in arbitrary arrests during the blockade. Cristosal also claimed that the blockade was established in the four municipalities specifically because they voted for Manuel Flores of the left-wing Farabundo Martí National Liberation Front (FMLN) over Bukele in the presidential election two months earlier. Cristosal added that the government had "repeated utilized the army as political tool on occasions to generate pressure and fear in various parts of the country" ("utilizado en reiteradas ocasiones al ejército como instrumento político para generar presión y miedo en diversos territorios del país").

Residents of the four municipalities under blockade told La Prensa Gráfica that the area had not had a gang problem in "more than six years" ("más de siete años"). The Resistance and Popular Rebellion Bloc denounced the blockade as a "military invasion" ("invasión militar") and demanded the security forces' withdrawal. The Nationalist Republican Alliance (ARENA) questioned Bukele's involvement in organizing the blockade as he was granted a leave of absence in November 2023 in order to seek re-election in 2024; Bukele legally would not be able to order the blockade's implementation as Merino had confirmed Bukele did.

== See also ==
- Blockade of the Cabañas Department
- Blockade of Nueva Concepción
- Blockade of Soyapango
