= Blockade of Nueva Concepción =

Anti-gang operation in El Salvador

- Part of the Salvadoran gang crackdown
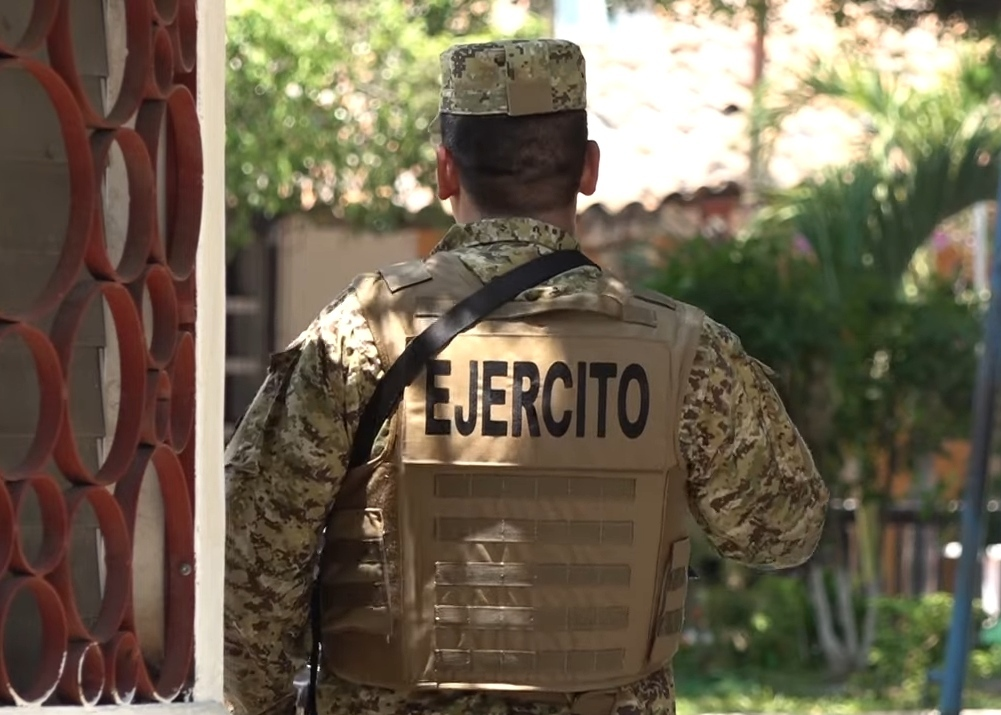
- A soldier stands guard in Nueva Concepción.
- Date: Began 17 May 2023
- Location: Nueva Concepción, El Salvador
- Result: 50 arrests: All 3 suspected killers captured; Capture of Fultón Locos Salvatruchos leaders

Parties
Salvadoran government: Salvadoran Army; National Civil Police	Criminal gangs; Mara Salvatrucha; Fultón Locos Salvatruchos

Lead figures
Nayib Bukele; René Merino Monroy; Mauricio Arriaza	Uncentralized leadership

Number
5,000 soldiers; 500 police officers	Unknown

Casualties
- Death: 1 police officer killed prior to operation
- Arrested: 50 alleged gang members, including the alleged original assassins and leaders of Fulton Locos Salvatruchos

The blockade of Nueva Concepción (Spanish: Cerco de Nueva Concepción) was an operation by the military and police of El Salvador against Mara Salvatrucha members operating in the town of Nueva Concepción. It began on 17 May 2023, one day after a police officer was ambushed and murdered by alleged gang members; in response to the killing, the government deployed 5,500 soldiers and officers to the municipality and announced an operation to search for the perpetrators and other gang members. Despite initially meager results, police announced on 26 May that the operation had led to the capture of fifty gang members, including the supposed killers and various gang leaders.

== Background ==
On 27 March 2022, the government of El Salvador, which has long suffered from high rates of gang violence, declared a state of exception following a spike in murders which resulted in 87 deaths in two days. The ensuing crackdown has seen more than 72,000 arrests, been credited with severely damaging El Salvador's criminal gangs, and generated controversy over allegations of human rights abuses.

The fifth phase of the government crackdown entails establishing circles around communities, especially large cities, to prevent gang members from fleeing and enable their arrest. Four such encirclements had been established in various parts of the country prior to the operation in Nueva Concepción, one prior to the announcement of phase five (Soyapango) and three since.

Nueva Concepción has been a stronghold of Mara Salvatrucha for years, with the Fultón Locos clique using the area as a drug trafficking route and operational center. According to police, gang leaders from across the country fled to the area after the crackdown began.

== Murder of police officer ==
On 16 May 2023, 52-year-old police officer Maximino Antonio Vásquez Rodríguez, a twenty-eight year veteran of the National Civil Police (PNC), was murdered while patrolling the canton El Zapote in Nueva Concepción, Chalatenango. According to anonymous police sources of El Diario de Hoy, police had received information at noon that several gang members were hiding in El Hormiguero, a hilltop hamlet in El Zapote. Four policemen, divided into teams of two, were sent to investigate. Between 2:00 and 2:30 p.m., one pair spotted four gang members, who fled. A gunfight ensued, during which Vásquez was shot twice in the head, killing him; he was the first police officer to be murdered by gang members since the start of the crackdown on 27 March 2022. (Note: Previously, a soldier was killed on 13 July 2022 after being ambushed by supposed gang members, and a police officer was murdered earlier in 2023, but not within the context of the crackdown.) One gang member was wounded and surrendered during the gunfight; the other three escaped. The injured suspect was taken to Zacamil National Hospital in San Salvador, from which he escaped that night; police announced the next morning that he had been recaptured.

== Government operation ==
During the afternoon of May 16, the PNC announced on Twitter that an officer had been murdered, that one suspect had been detained, and that a search for the others was underway. That night, at the government's request, the Legislative Assembly voted without discussion to extend the state of exception for the fourteenth time. The next morning, more than 5,000 soldiers and 500 police officers were deployed to Nueva Concepción. President Nayib Bukele announced on Twitter that a "security circle" (cerco de seguridad) had been established in the town, with officers stopping all arriving vehicles and demanding identification from their occupants. The military and police searched the town, including homes, for the three fugitive attackers and other gang members believed to still be hiding there, as well as the nearby hamlets of Las Casitas and Los Planes, among others; they also registered suspects. The search involved canine teams and the PNC's Tactical Operations Section; National Civil Police chief Mauricio Arriaza Chicas explained that Bukele had ordered them "to not spare resources" (no escatimar recursos). Bukele denounced critics of his security policies, claiming, "They only watch over the rights of criminals," and vowed, "They will pay dearly for the murder of our hero."

A 17 May press conference scheduled by the Security Cabinet to announce the results of the first day of the operation was postponed several times and ultimately canceled without explanation, and on 18 May, the Ministry of National Defense announced on social media only that they had recovered three abandoned radios. However, on 22 May, Arriaza announced on government television that more than thirty presumed gang members, an unspecified quantity of marijuana, and more than $40,000 in cash had been captured. He indicated that the captures included some of the primary suspects in Vásquez's murder as well as gang leaders and other members who had fled to Nueva Concepción to avoid capture during the crackdown. Arriaza added that the operation would continue until the President ordered them to withdraw.

On 26 May, the three suspects who initially evaded capture were presented at a Security Cabinet press conference, one of whom had been arrested by the National Civil Police of Guatemala in Asunción Mita, Jutiapa, after being found in a vacant lot illegally carrying two guns and drugs. The suspects were presented on their knees wearing bulletproof vests and protective helmets; Arriaza instructed them to remove their helmets "so that everyone knows them" (para que todo mundo los conozca), calling them "vile and cowardly terrorists" (viles y cobardes terroristas). Minister of Justice and Security Gustavo Villatoro identified them as members of the Fultón Locos clique of Mara Salvatrucha and noted that they are being held in the Terrorism Confinement Center. The head of the Public Ministry announced that they would be charged with aggravated murder, adding that the government would seek sentences of thirty to fifty years in prison. In addition, Minister of Defense René Merino reported that the operation had now resulted in the capture of fifty gang members. Villatoro stated that the blockade would continue without specifying a duration.
