= 2024 Pasaquina Bell UH-1 crash =

Aviation accident in El Salvador

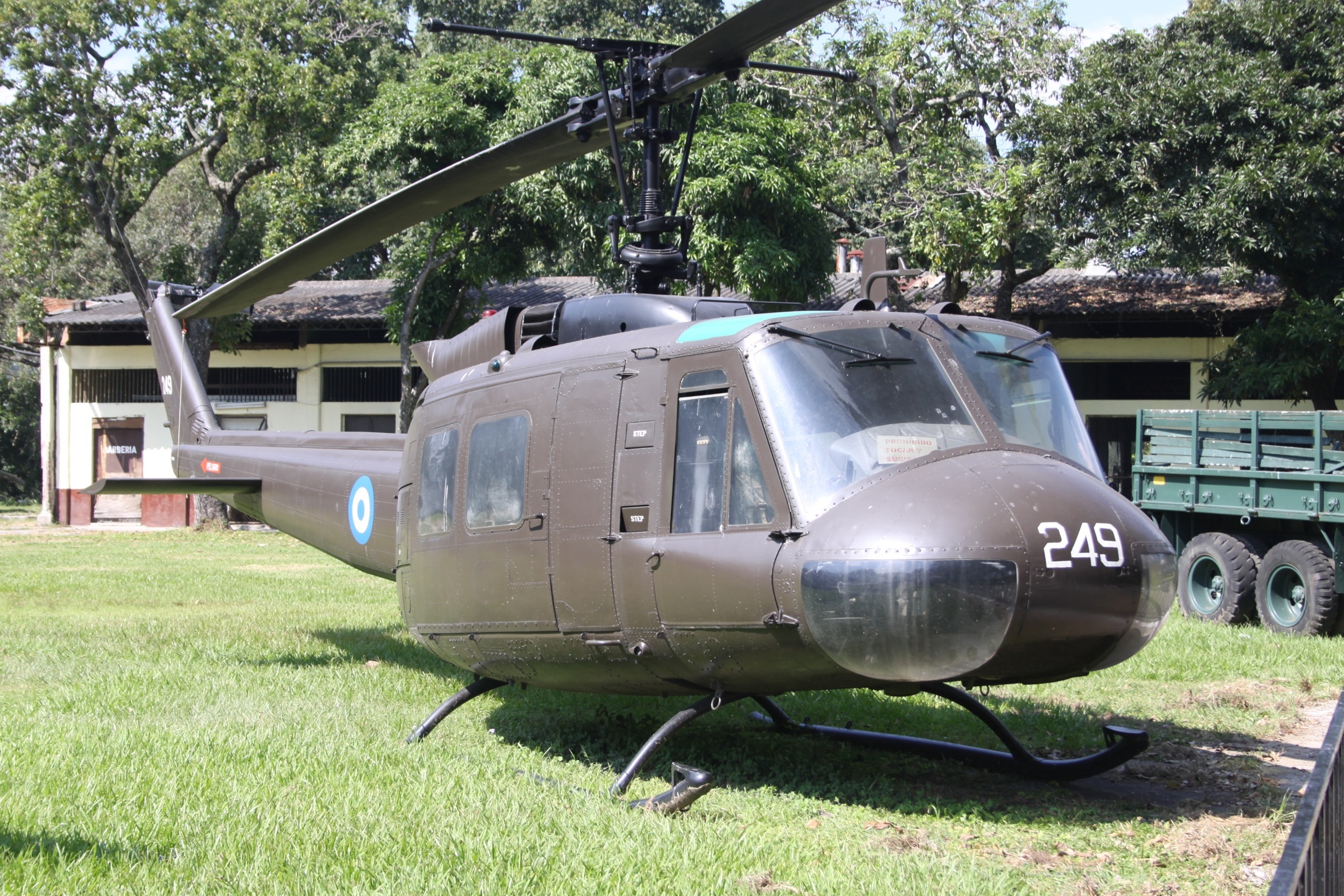
- A Bell UH-1H of the Salvadoran Air Force, similar to the one involved in the crash

Accident
- Date: 8 September 2024
- Summary: Crashed due to poor weather, bad visibility, and pilot error leading to spatial disorientation
- Site: Pasaquina, La Unión Department, El Salvador

Aircraft
- Aircraft type: Bell UH-1H
- Operator: Salvadoran Air Force
- Flight origin: Choluteca, Choluteca, Honduras
- Destination: San Salvador, El Salvador
- Occupants: 9
- Passengers: 2
- Crew: 7
- Fatalities: 9
- Survivors: 0

On 8 September 2024, a Bell UH-1H helicopter operated by the Salvadoran Air Force that was flying from Choluteca in Honduras to San Salvador crashed in the Pasaquina municipality of La Unión Department, El Salvador. The crash killed all nine people on board, including Mauricio Arriaza Chicas, the head of the Salvadoran National Civil Police.

== Background ==
=== Aircraft ===
The Aircraft was a Bell UH-1 Iroquois, operated by the Salvadoran Air Force, that was flying from Choluteca to San Salvador.

=== Passengers and crew ===
The aircraft was transporting the police chief Mauricio Arriaza Chicas, alongside him was Manuel Coto, a former bank manager accused of embezzlement, who had been detained and extradited on that same day in the Honduras–Nicaragua border. There were also four police officers, including deputy police commanders Douglas Omar García Funes and Rómulo Pompilio Romero Torres, and three air force personnel on board, as well as the head of communication for the Security Cabinet.

== Accident ==
The aircraft departed around 20:00 local time, from Choluteca, Honduras. Witnesses reported that the aircraft started to fly in an unstable condition until it finally crashed in the Pasaquina municipality minutes after takeoff, killing everyone on board.

== Investigation ==
The Salvadoran Air Force and the National Transportation Safety Board studied the crash immediately, it was concluded that the cause of the crash, was spatial disorientation during bad weather. This was because the pilot reduced the altitude trying to recover visibility until it finally lost control and crashed.

== Aftermath ==
Immediately, the witnesses of the crash praised the pilot, for trying to save the aircraft. The only part of the aircraft that was left intact was the empennage. Hours later the Salvadoran president, Nayib Bukele, declared three days of mourning. He also expressed doubts about the incident being accidental and called for international assistance in investigating the disaster. An official funeral for the victims was held at the former presidential residence in San Salvador on 11 September.
