= Casa Presidencial =

The term "Casa Presidencial" can refer to the following:

- Casa Presidencial (Costa Rica), the official residence of the President in Costa Rica.
- Casa Presidencial (El Salvador), the official residence of the President in El Salvador.
- Casa Presidencial (Guatemala), the official residence of the President in Guatemala.
- Casa Presidencial (Honduras), the official workplace of the President of Honduras.
