= Blockade of Soyapango =

Event of the 2022 Salvadoran gang crackdown

- Part of the Salvadoran gang crackdown
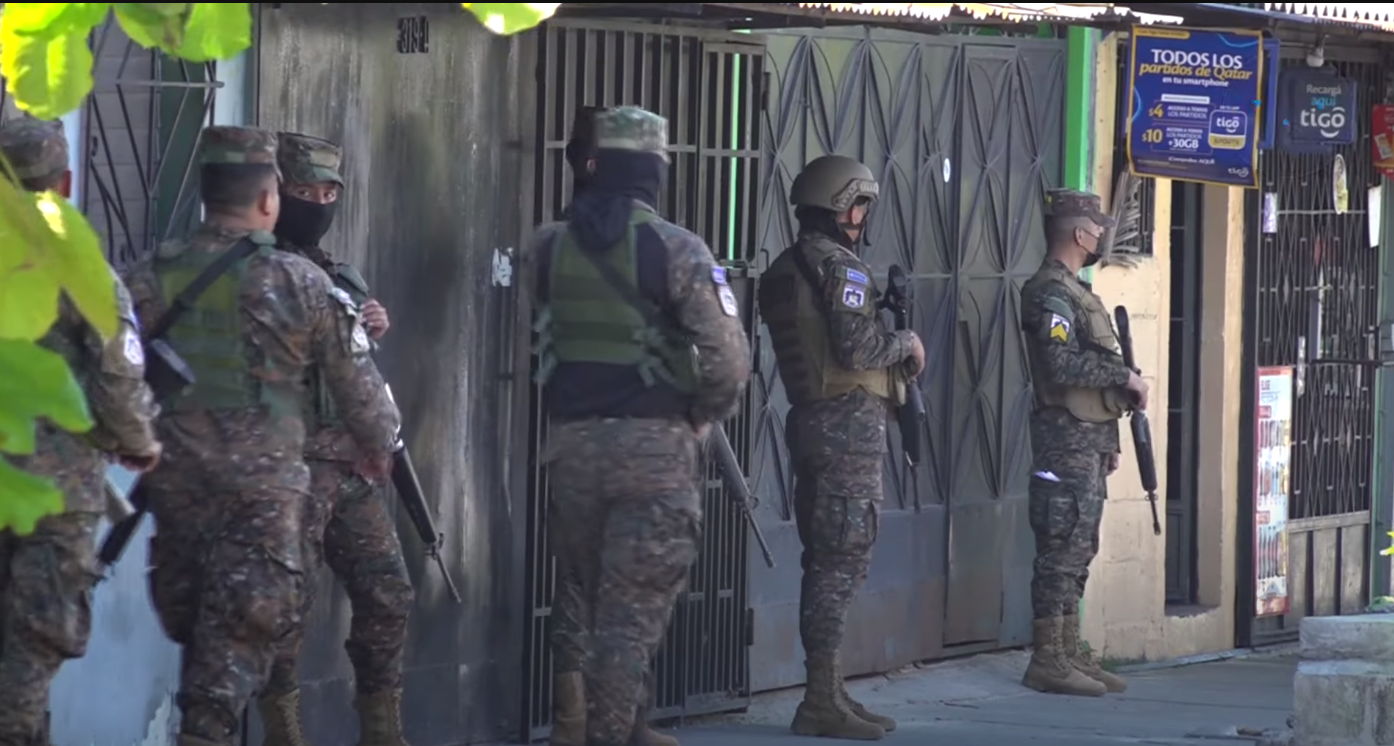
- Date: 3–31 December 2022 (28 days)
- Location: Soyapango, El Salvador; 13°42′35″N 89°08′19″W
- Result: Government victory: Government control asserted in Soyanpango and removal of gang related graffiti; 1,300+ alleged gang members apprehended; Security vigil stepped up in city

Parties
Salvadoran government: Salvadoran Army; National Civil Police	Criminal gangs: Mara Salvatrucha; 18th Street gang

Lead figures
Nayib Bukele; René Merino Monroy; Mauricio Arriaza	Uncentralized leadership

Number
10,000	Unknown

Casualties
- Arrested: 1,300+ (as of June 2023)

The blockade of Soyapango was a Salvadoran government operation to arrest criminal gang members of Mara Salvatrucha (MS-13) and 18th Street gang in the city of Soyapango. The operation began on 3 December 2022 when Salvadoran President Nayib Bukele announced that 10,000 members of the country's security forces surrounded the city. As of January 2023 the active phase of the blockade has been completed; however, security forces are still engaged in removing gang related symbols and the security setup in the area has been enhanced.

== Background ==
On 27 March 2022, the Salvadoran government declared a state of emergency following a spike in murders which resulted in 87 deaths between 25 and 27 March. From March 2022 to November 2022, the government arrested a total of 58,096 people with alleged affiliations to the country's two largest criminal gangs: Mara Salvatrucha (MS-13) and 18th Street gang. The gang crackdown reduced gang activity significantly and reduced murders by an order of magnitude. However, it was criticized by foreign governments and human rights groups, claiming that the government was violating human rights and utilizing arbitrary arrests.

== Operation ==
External video
- Bukele's tweet announcing the beginning of the blockade.

On 3 December 2022, Salvadoran President Nayib Bukele announced that 10,000 members of the country's security forces, composing of 8,500 soldiers and 1,500 police officers, surrounded the city of Soyapango with the goal of arresting every gang member in the city. The soldiers blocked roads and searched homes for gang members, as well as checking identity documents from anyone leaving the city. According to René Merino Monroy, the Minister of National Defense, a total of 185 people were arrested within the first three days of the operation.

In the early morning of October 11, 2023, President Nayib Bukele announced a new deployment of security forces in the community of La Campanera, located in the district of Soyapango, in the department of San Salvador. This movement was in response to the homicide of a minor in that area the day before.

The security deployment announced by Bukele also included the surrounding urbanizations of Popotlán and Valle Verde, located in the Apopa district. The operation included the sending of combined forces of the National Civil Police with a total of 500 elements and the Armed Forces of El Salvador with 3,500 troops.

== Reactions ==
Residents of Soyapango reportedly supported the operation.
