= Pasaquina =

- Municipality
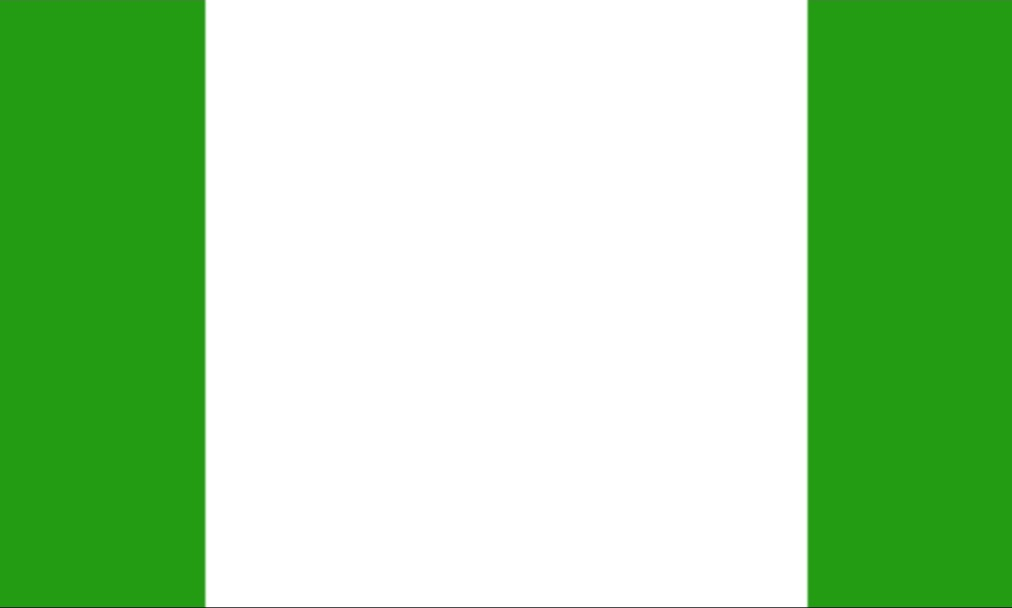
- Flag

- Location in El Salvador
- Coordinates: 13°35′4″N 87°50′28″W
- Country: El Salvador
- Department: La Unión Department

Government
  - Mayor/alcalde: Aparicio Villatoro

Population (2020)
  - Total: 17,152
  - Density: 150/sq mi (58.1/km^{2})
- Time zone: CST-6
- Website: pasaquinacity.net

Pasaquina is a municipality in the La Unión department of El Salvador.

== History ==
During the pre-Columbian times the territory was inhabited by Mayan groups called the Uluas. Under the Spanish colonial era, Pasaquina was joined as a part of San Alejo in 1786.

For the nineteenth century, the region was incorporated into the Department of San Miguel in 1824 and annexed to the Union in 1865. They earned the title of "town" in 1872, and the title of "city" in 1920. On September 8 2024, a helicopter crashed in the municipality. All 9 people on board were killed

== Overview ==
The municipality covers an area of 295,28 km ² and has a header altitude of 60 meters. The Mayan topónimo Pasaquina Ulua would meanings of "City of white beans" or "Path of bitterness".

The festivities are celebrated in the month of January in honor of San Sebastian Martyr. Pasaquina has a high level of emigration, mainly to the United States.

== Sports ==
The local professional football club is named C.D. Pasaquina and it currently plays in the Primera División.
