= Mauricio Arriaza Chicas =

Salvadoran police officer (1964–2024)

General Commissioner Mauricio Arriaza Chicas
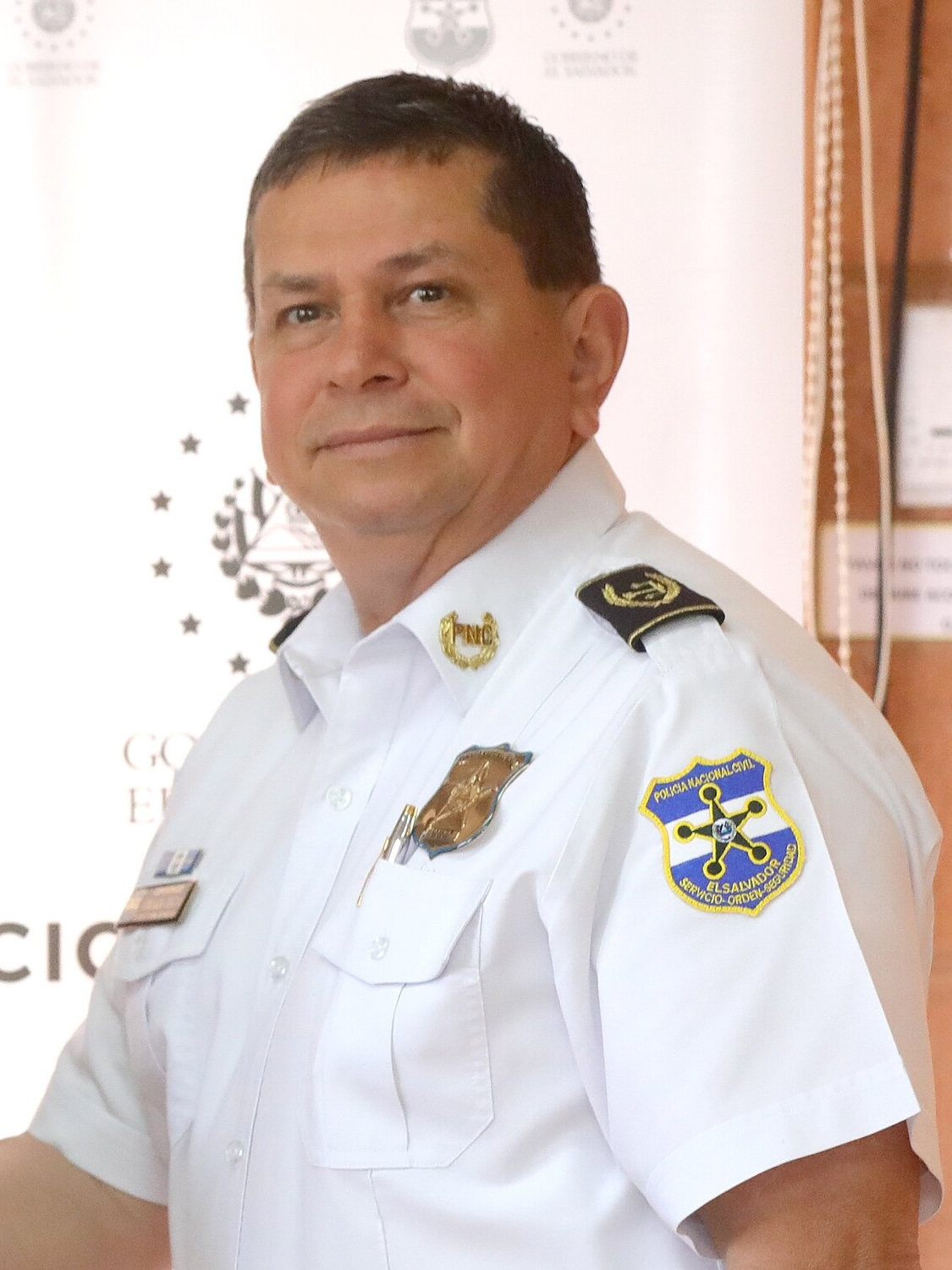
- Arriaza Chicas in 2020

13th Director of the National Civil Police
- In office 1 June 2019 – 8 September 2024
- President: Nayib Bukele
- Preceded by: Howard Cotto Castaneda
- Succeeded by: César Flores Murillo (interim)

Personal details
- Born: Mauricio Antonio Arriaza Chicas; 16 December 1964 Chalchuapa, El Salvador
- Died: 8 September 2024 (aged 59) Pasaquina, El Salvador
- Cause of death: Helicopter crash
- Education: Captain General Gerardo Barrios Military School
- Occupation: Police officer
- Police career
- Allegiance: El Salvador
- Department: National Civil Police
- Service years: 1993–2024
- Rank: General Commissioner

Mauricio Antonio Arriaza Chicas (16 December 1964 – 8 September 2024) was a Salvadoran police officer who served as the director of the National Civil Police (PNC) of El Salvador from 2019 until his death in a helicopter crash in 2024.

== Early life and career ==
Mauricio Antonio Arriaza Chicas was born on 16 December 1964 in Chalchuapa, El Salvador.

Arriaza graduated from the Captain General Gerardo Barrios Military School. He later graduated from the School of the Americas in 1986 and the Carabineros School of Chile in 1988. In 1993, Arriaza transferred from the Armed Forces of El Salvador to the National Civil Police (PNC) as a part of the Chapultepec Peace Accords' mandate that 20 percent of the armed forces' soldiers must be transitioned to being police officers. In 1995, Arriaza obtained his licentiate of judicial sciences at the University of the Americas.

In 1996, Arriaza and eleven other PNC police officers were arrested on the orders of the Office of the Attorney General (FGR) for supposedly "vitiating and manipulating" ("viciar y manipular") evidence in the arrest of Nelson Martínez Comandari by allegedly planting a rifle. He was suspended from the PNC but was ultimately acquitted and was restored to his position in 2003.

== Director of the National Civil Police ==
On 1 June 2019, newly inaugurated president Nayib Bukele appointed Arriaza as the director of the PNC. Upon becoming director, Arriaza promised that police officers would be "in the entire territory" ("estar en todo el territorio") of El Salvador to combat crime. On 19 June, Bukele's security ministers announced the beginning of the Territorial Control Plan, a nationwide government anti-gang campaign. Arriaza and Minister of Justice Rogelio Rivas announced that 2,500 police officers would initially be stationed in 12 of the country's 262 municipalities where gangs hold the most influence before expanding to the remaining municipalities.

=== Involvement in 9F ===
On 9 February 2020, 40 soldiers and 51 police officers accompanied Bukele inside the Legislative Assembly's Blue Room — its meeting room — amidst tension between Bukele and the legislature over the approval of a US$109 million loan to finance the Territorial Control Plan. Lawyers and opposition lawmakers described the incident, known in El Salvador as "9F", as a "self coup" ("autogolpe"). In August 2020, during a Legislative Assembly inquiry into the incident, Arriaza stated that the PNC had express permission from the Legislative Assembly to be present inside the Blue Room to provide security. On 27 October, the Constitutional Chamber of the Supreme Court of Justice declared the events of 9F as unconstitutional, including the presence of the 51 police officers.

=== 2020–2021 removal proceedings ===
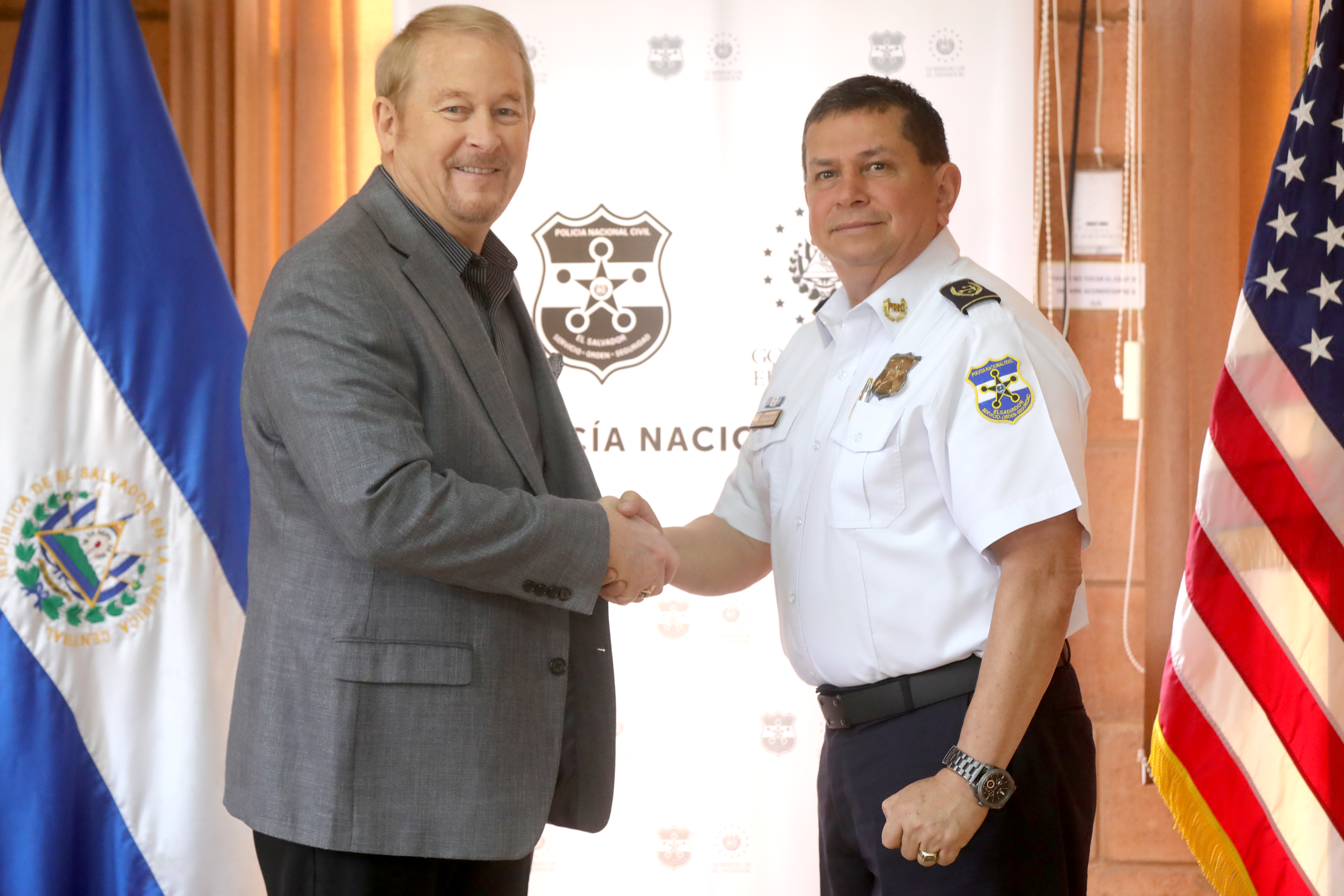
Arriaza with U.S. ambassador Ronald D. Johnson in 2020

In September 2020, lawyer Ruth Eleonora López asked the Constitutional Chamber to declare Arriaza's appointment as director of the PNC as unconstitutional for being a former soldier, citing a constitutional separation between the military and public security. The chamber agreed to hear the case in April 2021.

In October 2020, opposition lawmakers criticized Arriaza for not obeying two government orders: one by the Legislative Assembly to make Minister of Finance Alejandro Zelaya testify before the legislature, and one by Attorney General Raúl Melara to allow garbage trucks to access the Nejapa landfill as police officers were blockading access. FMLN deputy Schafik Hándal Vega and ARENA deputy Mauricio Vargas accused Arriaza of being more loyal to Bukele than the law. López stated that Arriaza's disobedience violated the constitution.

On 12 October 2020, Bukele appointed Arriaza as the vice minister of public security. On 10 November, the FGR filed a petition to remove Arriaza as vice minister of public security and director of the PNC for allegedly failing to complete his duties regarding the two orders he disobeyed. The petition was filed as Arriaza had immunity from prosecution due to his appointment as vice minister of public security. Bukele accused the FGR of attempting to undermine the Territorial Control Plan by filing the petition against Arriaza. Arriaza attended a series of legislative hearings and defended his actions in late November 2020. On 4 December, the Legislative Assembly voted to suspend Arriaza from carrying out his duties as director of the PNC pending the outcome of his removal case. Arriaza resigned as vice minister of public security on 7 December. The removal proceedings were suspended in May 2021 after the newly elected Legislative Assembly voted to remove Melara as attorney general and Arriaza resumed his duties as PNC director. The new attorney general, Rodolfo Delgado, stated that the Office of the Attorney General sought to cooperate with the National Civil Police to ensure public security.

=== Gang crackdown ===
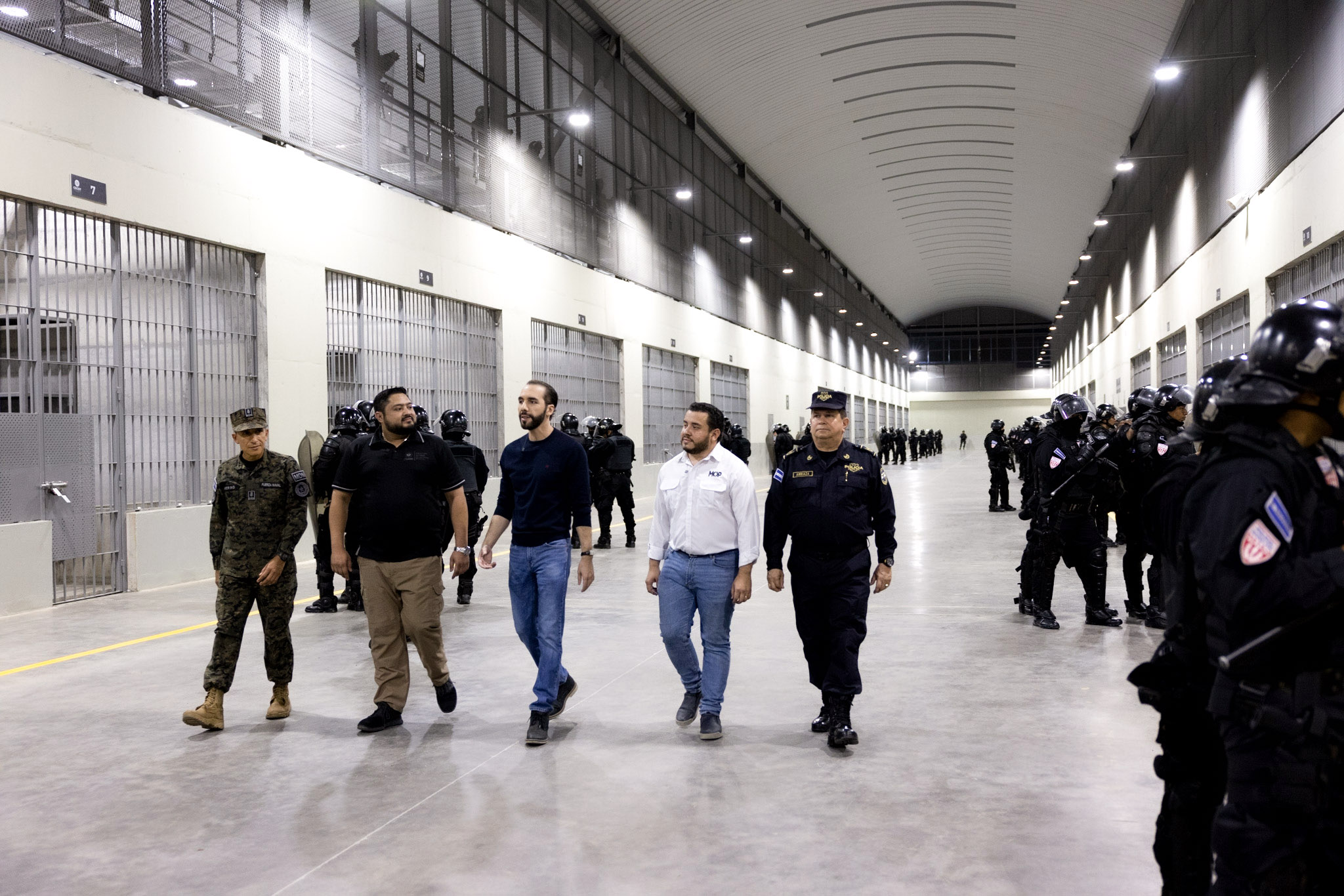
Arriaza (far-right) touring the Terrorism Confinement Center

In late March 2022, Bukele and the Legislative Assembly declared a state of exception following a spike in homicides. In the subsequent gang crackdown, Arriaza organized the PNC's operations to arrests thousands of suspected gang members. The crackdown received criticism from human rights groups, and Human Rights Watch called for countries to implement travel bans against Arriaza and to freeze his assets for allegedly being responsible for "widespread human rights violations" during the gang crackdown.

On 18 May 2023, Bukele promoted Arriaza to the rank of general commissioner. On 3 June 2024, Bukele issued a decree which stated that Arriaza would continue to serve as director of the PNC during his second term. The Legislative Assembly confirmed Bukele's decree on 8 June.

== Personal life ==
Arriaza was married to Claudia de Arriaza and had two children. Arriaza was posthumously awarded the Gold Cross of the Order of Police Merit on 28 August 2025. On 15 September 2025, the National Civil Police's academy was named after Arriaza.

== Death ==
On 8 September 2024, Arriaza met Honduran authorities at the El Salvador–Honduras border to accept the extradition of Manuel Coto. Coto was a former manager of the Santa Victoria Cooperative Savings and Credit Association (COSAVI) who was arrested by Honduran authorities earlier that day on a Salvadoran arrest warrant for allegedly misappropriating US$35 million in government funds. While flying back to San Salvador, the Salvadoran Air Force Bell UH-1 Iroquois helicopter carrying Arriaza and Coto crashed near Pasaquina in La Unión Department. The Salvadoran military confirmed the deaths of all 9 people on board the helicopter, including Arriaza, Coto, and two of Arriaza's deputies, early on 9 September.

Bukele expressed doubt that the crash was an accident and called for international assistance in investigating the disaster. He ordered all Salvadoran flags to be lowered to half-mast for three days. Arriaza was buried on 11 September following an official funeral for him and the other victims of the crash at the former presidential residence in San Salvador.

Commissioner César Flores Murillo, the director of the National Academy of Public Safety, replaced Arriaza on an interim basis.

== See also ==
- Cabinet of Nayib Bukele

Police appointments
Preceded by Howard Cotto Castaneda	Director of the National Civil Police; 2019–2024	Succeeded by César Flores Murillo (interim)
