= Nueva Concepción =

- District

- Location in El Salvador
- Coordinates: 14°8′N 89°18′W
- Country: El Salvador
- Department: Chalatenango
- Municipality: Chalatenango Centro
- Elevation: 1,109 ft (338 m)

Population (2024)
  - District: 27,209
  - Rank: 55th in El Salvador
  - Urban: 8,890
  - Rural: 18,319

Nueva Concepción is a district in the Chalatenango Department of El Salvador.

== Geography ==
The city of Nueva Concepción is located in the department of Chalatenango in the North region of the country. In Nueva Concepción notable rivers are the Rio Lempa, Rio Jayuca, Rio Moja Flores, Rio San Nicolás and other rivers. Nueva Concepción is also known for its water park, "Splash".

The main way to get to Nueva Concepción (coming from San Salvador) is the northern troncal del norte (CA4) road going towards Chalatenango and then the CA3 W.

=== Climate ===
Climate data for Nueva Concepción (1991–2020)
Month	Jan	Feb	Mar	Apr	May	Jun	Jul	Aug	Sep	Oct	Nov	Dec	Year
Mean daily maximum °C (°F)	34.4 (93.9)	35.9 (96.6)	37.1 (98.8)	37.4 (99.3)	34.9 (94.8)	33.2 (91.8)	33.7 (92.7)	33.6 (92.5)	32.7 (90.9)	32.6 (90.7)	33.1 (91.6)	33.8 (92.8)	34.4 (93.9)
Daily mean °C (°F)	25.7 (78.3)	27.0 (80.6)	28.1 (82.6)	28.8 (83.8)	27.7 (81.9)	26.4 (79.5)	26.2 (79.2)	26.0 (78.8)	25.7 (78.3)	25.6 (78.1)	25.4 (77.7)	25.3 (77.5)	26.5 (79.7)
Mean daily minimum °C (°F)	18.5 (65.3)	19.6 (67.3)	21.0 (69.8)	22.6 (72.7)	22.8 (73.0)	22.3 (72.1)	21.4 (70.5)	21.6 (70.9)	21.9 (71.4)	21.3 (70.3)	19.6 (67.3)	18.3 (64.9)	20.9 (69.6)
Average precipitation mm (inches)	1.9 (0.07)	4.3 (0.17)	15.0 (0.59)	58.9 (2.32)	195.3 (7.69)	306.0 (12.05)	259.2 (10.20)	296.2 (11.66)	315.8 (12.43)	199.0 (7.83)	49.8 (1.96)	7.8 (0.31)	1,709.1 (67.29)
Average relative humidity (%)	60	58	57	61	72	81	79	81	83	80	71	65	70.7
Source: Ministerio de Medio Ambiente y Recursos Naturales

== Population ==
As of June 2020, the population to Nueva Concepción is at least 32,000 people. Men represent nearly 54% of the population whereas women make up the remaining 46%. Roughly two thirds of the residents live in rural area whereas one third reside in urban area.
