= René Merino Monroy =

Minister of Defense of El Salvador (2019–present)

Admiral René Merino Monroy
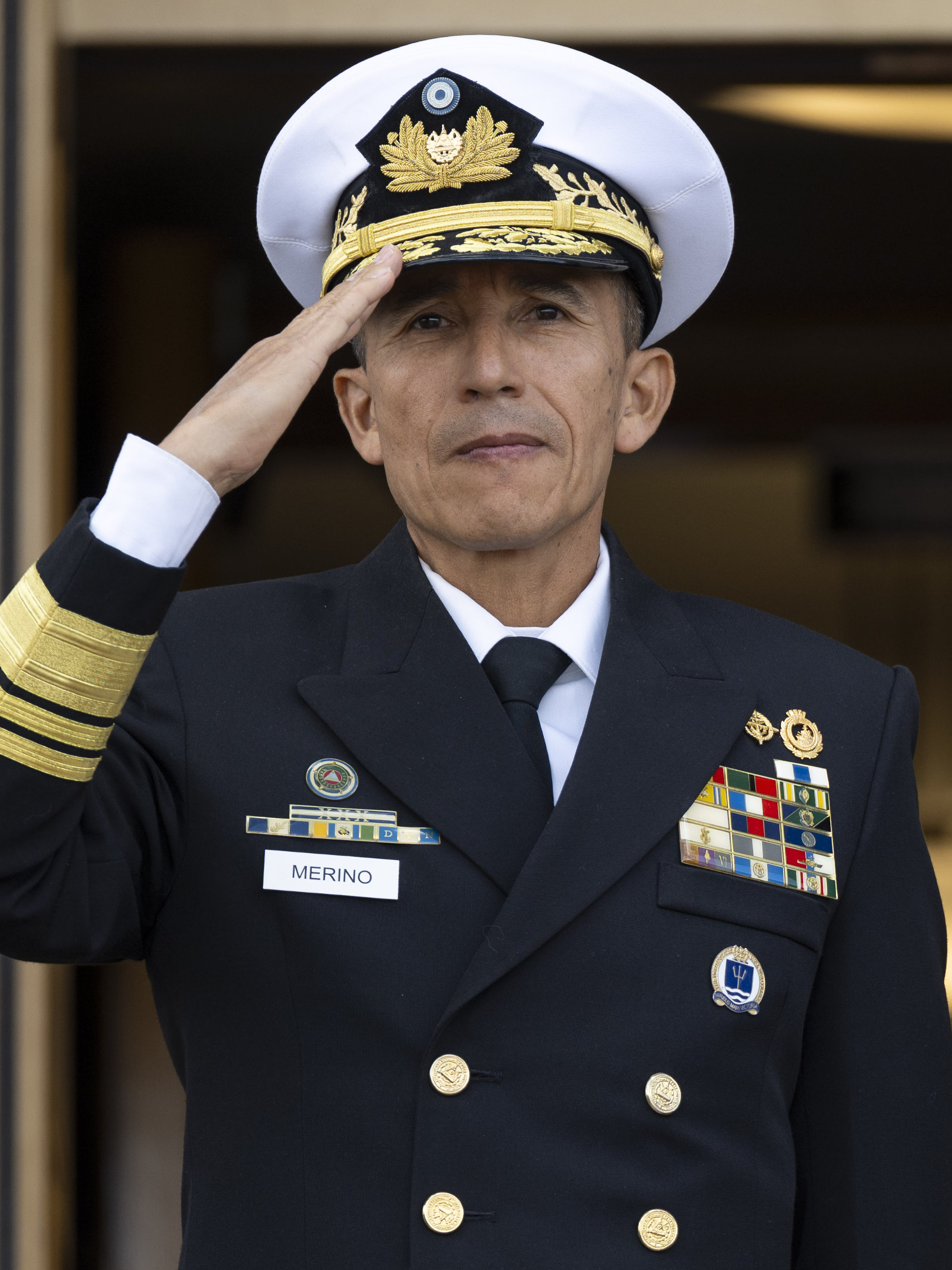
- Merino in 2025 as a vice admiral

49th Minister of National Defense of El Salvador
- Incumbent
- Assumed office 1 June 2019
- President: Nayib Bukele; Claudia Rodríguez (acting)
- Preceded by: David Munguía Payés

Chief of the Navy General Staff
- In office January 2015 – 1 June 2019
- President: Salvador Sánchez Cerén

Personal details
- Born: René Francis Merino Monroy; 30 December 1963 (age 62) Santa Tecla, El Salvador
- Party: Independent
- Education: Captain General Gerardo Barrios Military School
- Occupation: Military officer

Military service
- Allegiance: El Salvador
- Branch/service: Navy of El Salvador
- Years of service: 1990–present
- Rank: Admiral
- Battles/wars: Salvadoran Civil War; Iraq War; Salvadoran gang crackdown

René Francis Merino Monroy (born 30 December 1963) is a Salvadoran military officer who currently serves as the minister of national defense. He was appointed to the position by President Nayib Bukele in June 2019, becoming the first officer from the Salvadoran Navy to serve as minister of defense.

Merino entered the Captain General Gerardo Barrios Military School in 1986. He graduated in 1990 and was appointed to various administrative positions at the La Unión Naval Base and the Naval Force Headquarters. From 1995 to 2010, Merino transferred between various command positions and continued his military education both domestically and abroad. Merino held more administrative positions from 2011 to 2014 at the La Unión Naval Base and the Center for Naval Education and Instruction. He was the Chief of the Navy General Staff from January 2015 until his appointment to minister of defense in June 2019.

As minister of defense, Merino has supported Bukele's security policies, most notably the implementations of both the Territorial Control Plan, a government anti-crime and anti-gang security program, and the nationwide gang crackdown which has since resulted in the arrests of over 72,000 suspected gang members since March 2022. Merino was also involved in the 2020 political crisis when 40 soldiers were sent into the Legislative Assembly during an extraordinary session convened by Bukele. Merino's rank promotions to rear admiral in 2019 and vice admiral in 2020 resulted in controversy from lawyers regarding the maximum age for which military promotions are permitted by the Military Career Law.

== Early life and education ==
René Francis Merino Monroy was born on 30 December 1963 in Santa Tecla, El Salvador. He entered the Captain General Gerardo Barrios Military School (EMCGGB) in Santa Tecla in January 1986. In June, he transferred to Fort Benning in Columbus, Georgia, studying to be a naval cadet, and later returned to the EMCGGB in December. In February 1987, he transferred to the Arturo Prat Naval School in Valparaíso, Chile, where he continued his studies to be a naval officer until December 1989 when he returned to the EMCGGB. He graduated from the military school in March 1990.

From January to July 1995, Merino studied the English language at the Armed Forces Language Center. From January to June 1996, he studied advanced infantry at the General Manuel José Arce Infantry School. He returned to the infantry school from January to June 2002 to study to become a member of the naval staff. In 2002, Merino was a proprietary director of the Social Security Institute of the Armed Forces' directive council. From December 2002 to November 2004, Merino studied to become a member of the general staff at the Dr. Manuel Enrique Araujo Command and General Staff School. From July 2007 to June 2008, Merino continued his naval staff studies at the United States Naval War College. Merino returned to the Arturo Prat Naval School from February to November 2010 to continue his general staff studies.

== Military career ==
Merino's first assignment was the La Unión Naval Base from March 1990 to December 1991 as a commander of the coast guard during the Salvadoran Civil War. Merino served in various administrative positions during his time with the navy, which included being the chief of the Captaincy Department at the Naval Force Headquarters from January 1992 to December 1993, the chief of the Department of Academic Development for the Center at Naval Education and Instruction from January to December 1994, and the chief of the Department of Captaincies at the General Staff of the Naval Force from August to December 1995.

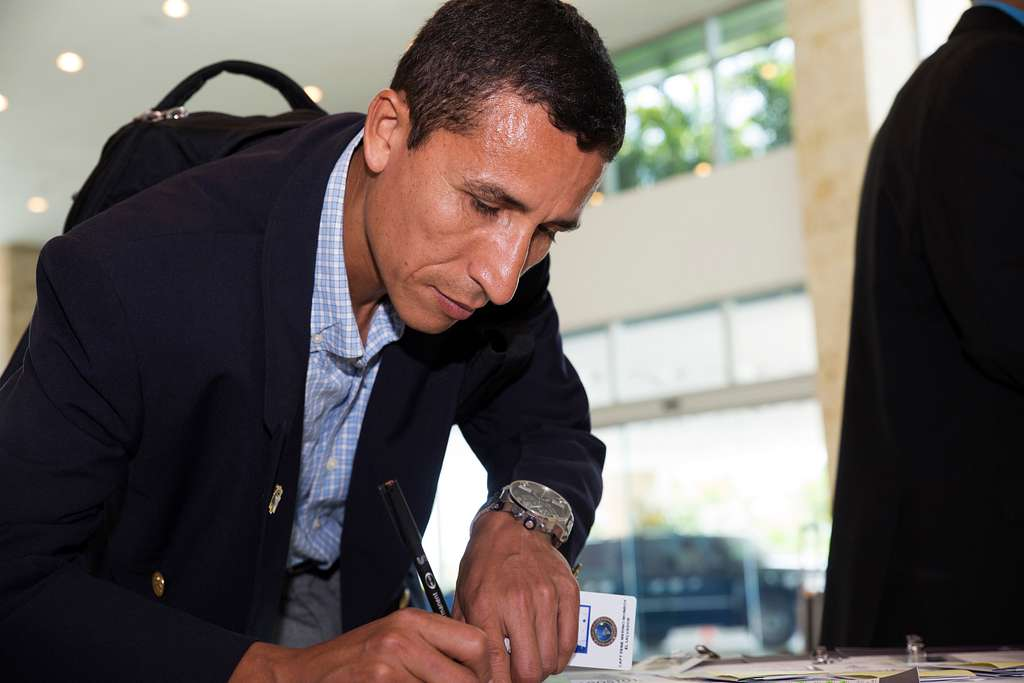
Merino as Chief of the Navy General Staff at the 2015 Marine Leaders of the Americas Conference in Colombia

In July 1996, Merino was briefly a company commander at the EMCGGB before becoming a company commander for the S-3 Presidential Battalion, where he served from August 1996 to August 1999. From September to December 1999, Merino was the maritime patrol commander of the La Unión Naval Base. From January 2000 to December 2001 and again from July to November 2002, he was the General Director of Captaincies at the La Libertad Port. From December 2004 to July 2007, Merino served as the chief of studies at the Center for Naval Education and Instruction.

From June 2008 to February 2009, Merino served as a company commander in the Cuscatlán Battalion XI Contingent during the Iraq War. After returning from Iraq, he resumed his post as the chief of studies at the Center for Naval Education and Instruction which he held from February to June 2009. From June 2009 to February 2010, Merino was a member of the N-III Fleet staff. From January 2011 to June 2012, Merino was the director of the Center for Naval Education and Instruction. He later commanded the La Unión Naval Base from July 2013 to June 2014 and was a fleet commander from July to December 2014. Merino was appointed as the Chief of the Navy General Staff in January 2015 where he served until June 2019.

== Minister of National Defense ==
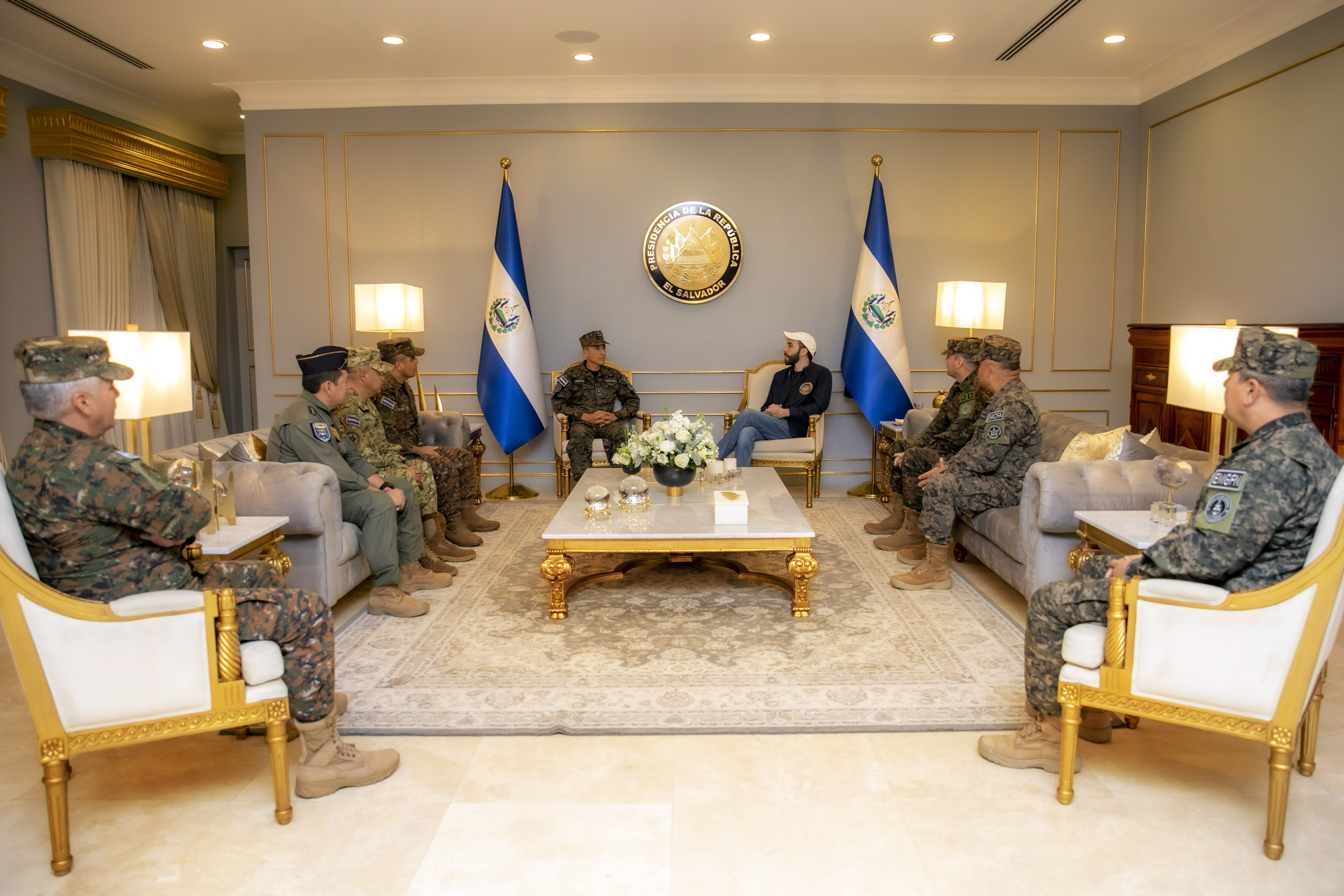
Merino in a meeting with Bukele

In May 2019, then President-elect Nayib Bukele announced that he would appoint Merino as his minister of defense. Opposition politicians from the Nationalist Republican Alliance and the Farabundo Martí National Liberation Front questioned Bukele's decision to choose Merino as he held the rank of navy captain (equivalent of a colonel) rather any rank equivalent to general. Merino was sworn in as minister of defense on 1 June 2019, succeeding Divisional General David Munguía Payés. Merino was the first naval officer to assume the office.

After Bukele's second inauguration on 1 June 2024, the Salvadoran government announced that all incumbent cabinet ministers, including Merino, would stay in office until further notice.

=== Security policies ===
Shortly after being sworn in as minister of defense, Merino promised that he would develop a strategy to combat crime and street gangs in El Salvador. On 20 June 2019, the Salvadoran government announced the beginning of the Territorial Control Plan, a seven phase security program aimed at combating crime and street gangs.

In March 2022, a spike of homicides occurred when 87 homicides were registered in a three day period. The Legislative Assembly convened an extraordinary session and approved the implementation of a 30-day "state of exception" which suspending some constitutional rights, increasing the amount of time individuals could be detained without trial, and allowing the government to monitor citizens' communications without warrants. The ensuing gang crackdown, which has been extended 25 times as of April 2023, has led to the arrests of over 78,000 suspected gang members as of 2 April 2024. In January 2023, Merino announced that the government registered 496 homicides in 2022, a 56.8 percent decrease from 1,147 homicides in 2021. He attributed the decrease in homicides to the gang crackdown.

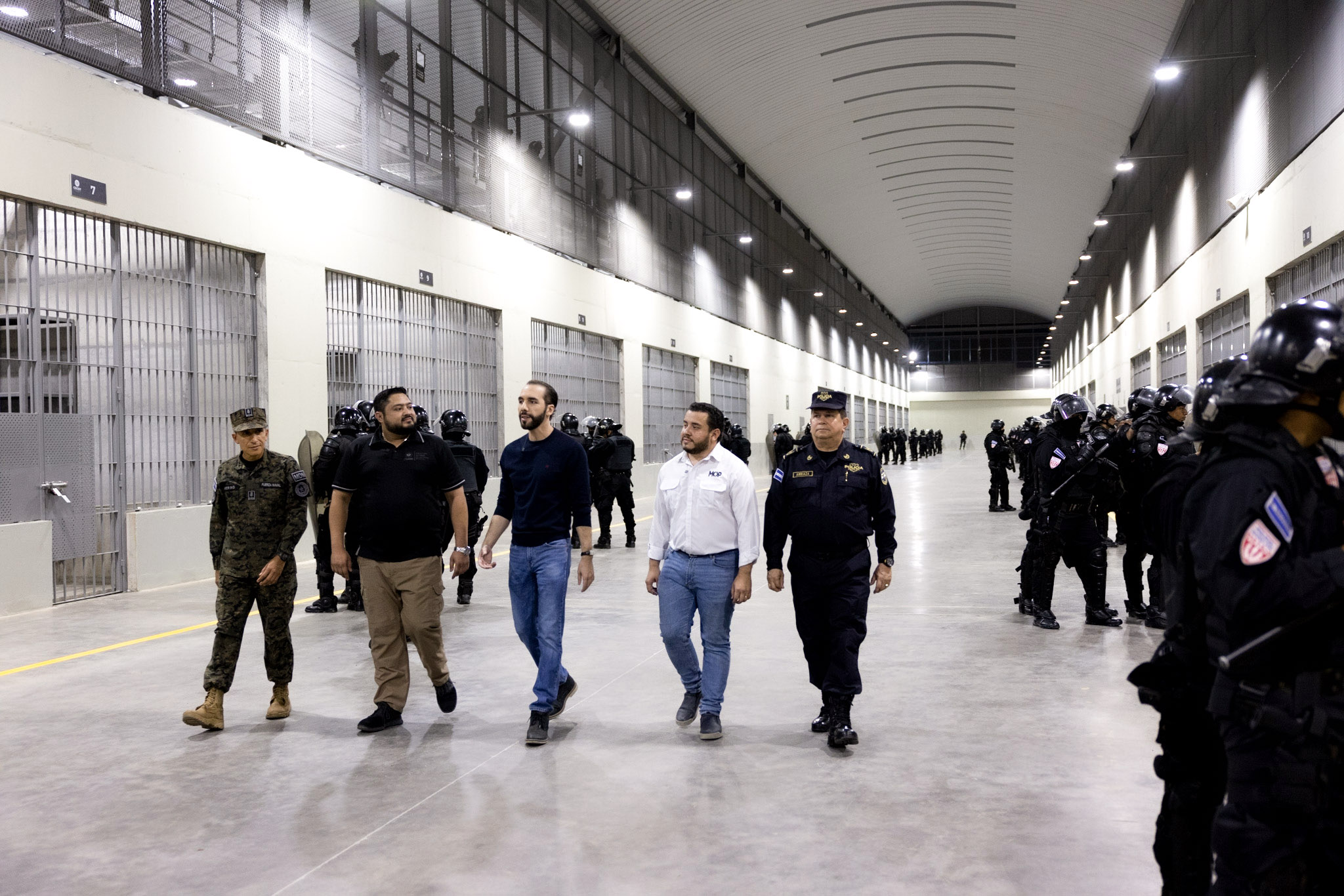
Merino (far-left) touring CECOT

On 1 February 2023, Bukele posted a video to Twitter showing him, Merino, General Director of Penal Centers Osiris Luna Meza, Director of the National Civil Police Mauricio Arriaza Chicas, and Minister of Public Works Romeo Herrera touring the Terrorism Confinement Center (CECOT), a prison with the capacity to hold 40,000 inmates. CECOT was built to incarcerate those arrested in the country's gang crackdown. During the tour, Merino presented the 1,000 guards, 600 soldiers, and 250 police officers which would be assigned to operate and secure the prison to Bukele. CECOT opened on 24 February 2023, and as of 9 July 2023, the prison holds over 12,500 inmates.

On 15 September 2022, Bukele announced his intention to seek re-election in the 2024 presidential election. Merino expressed his support for Bukele's re-election bid, stating that "the re-election of President Bukele would permit him to continue with the security policies" ("la reelección del Presidente Bukele permitirá seguir con las políticas de seguridad").

=== Involvement in 9F ===
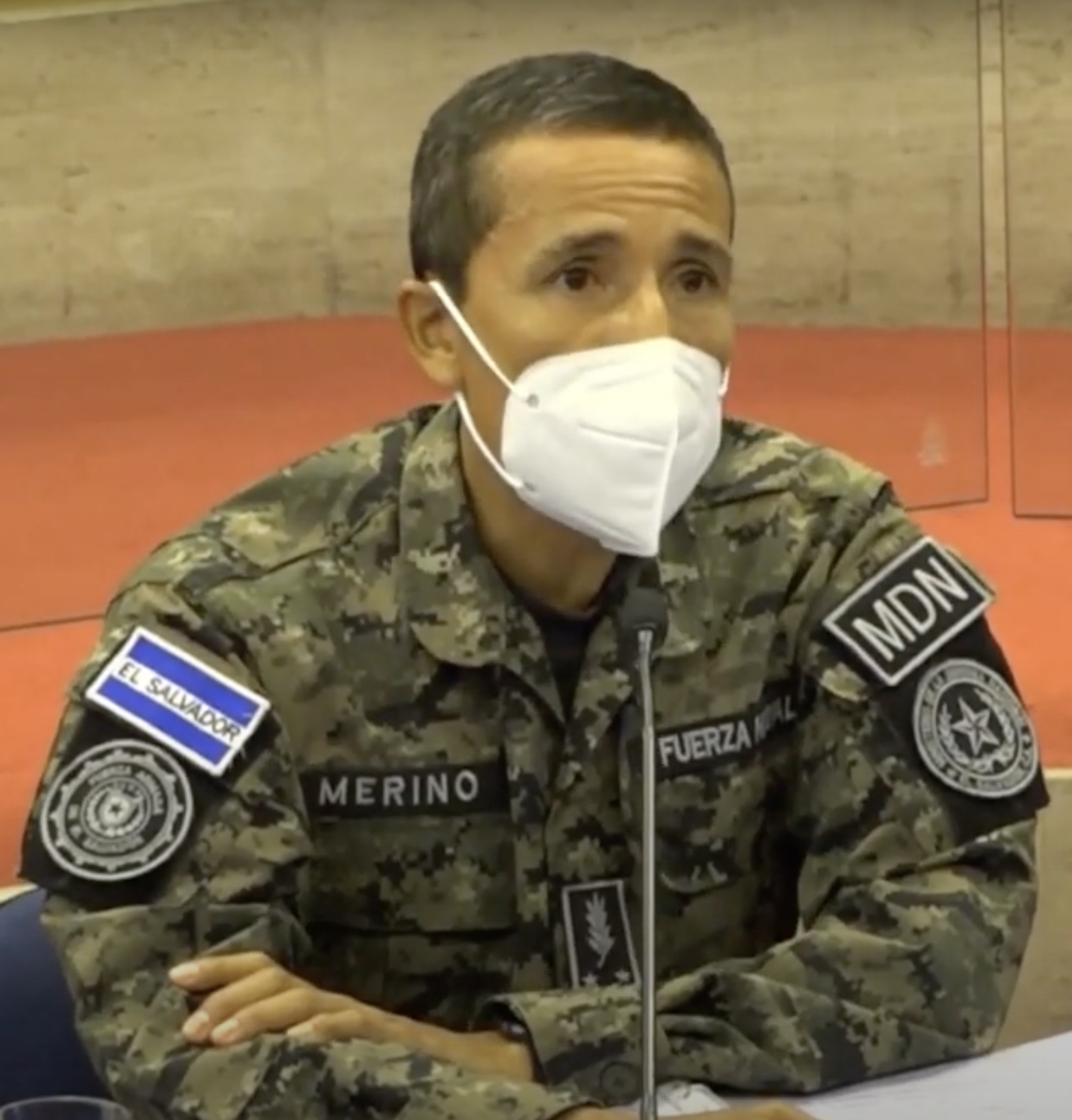
Merino testifying at the Legislative Assembly regarding the events of 9F

On 9 February 2020, Bukele ordered 40 soldiers to enter the Legislative Assembly meeting room after ordering an extraordinary legislative session to be held. Bukele did this amidst then-ongoing resistance from the Legislative Assembly to approve a US$109 million loan from the Central American Bank for Economic Integration to fund the Territorial Control Plan. The event was described the incident as an attempted coup and a self-coup by the opposition.

On 21 August 2020, the Legislative Assembly summon Merino to testify regarding the events of 9 February 2020, which has since been referred to in El Salvador by the numeronym "9F". Merino testified before the Legislative Assembly for 10 hours, during which, he stated he was ordered to send in the soldiers to provide security for the extraordinary session, but he refused to say who ordered him to do so. While being questioned by the Legislative Assembly, Merino stated that his purpose was to explain the use of soldiers and not to explain Bukele's "political act".

=== Promotions ===
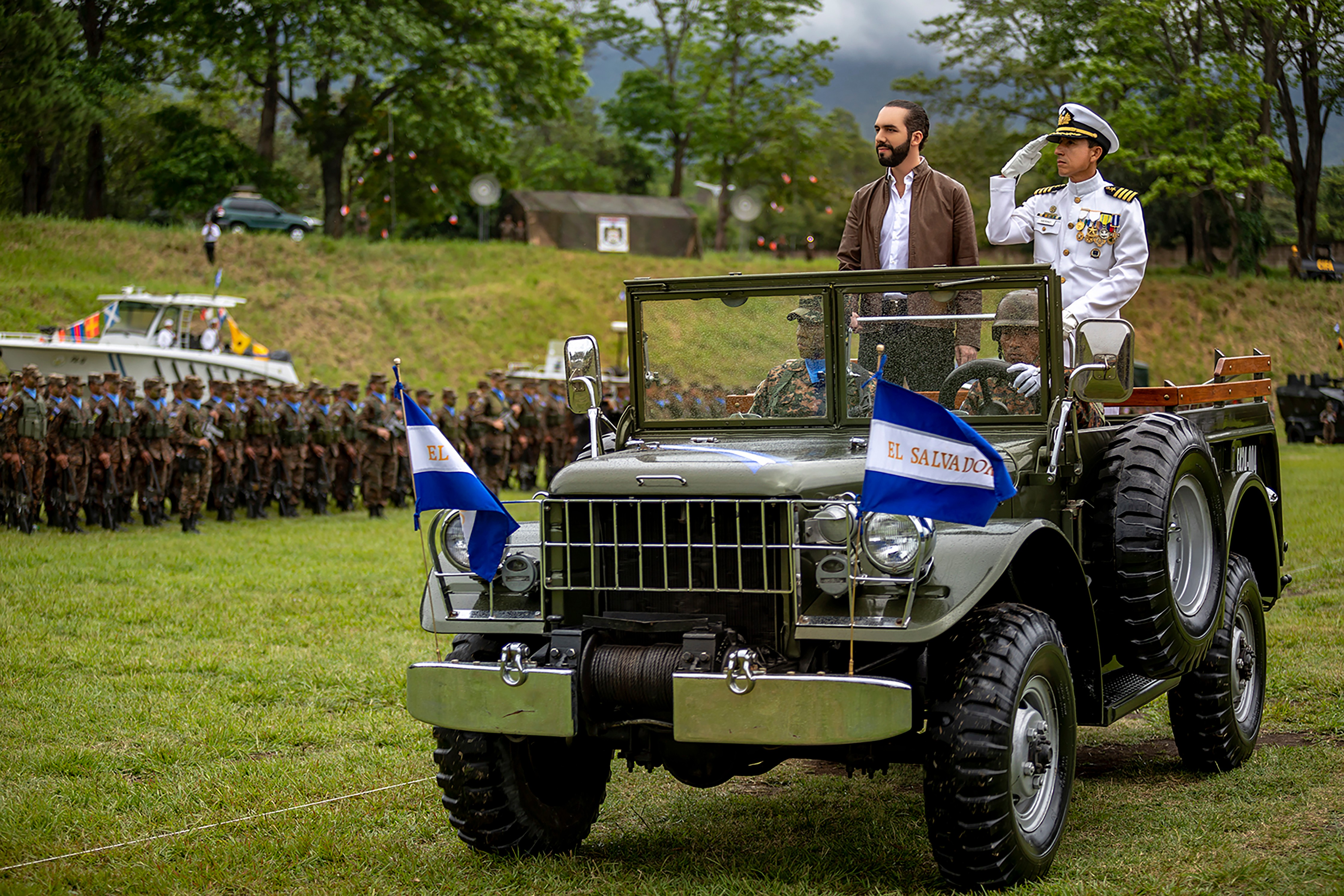
Bukele and Merino inspecting soldiers of the armed forces in 2019

In 2018, Merino sought promotion to the rank of rear admiral. Article 13 of the Military Career Law prevented him from doing so as he was 55 years old and the law prohibited promotions in rank past that age. Instead, he would automatically enter reserve status. On 31 December 2019, Bukele promoted Merino to the rank of rear admiral. Lawyers argued that Merino's promotion was illegal as it violated article 13 of the Military Career Law. Merino defended his promotion, stating that "I didn't give it myself, they ordered it to me" ("no me lo receté yo, me lo ordenaron"). He added that "I submitted, like all my military promotion, to the pertinent evaluations, being evaluated by an evaluation and selection tribunal appointed in the previous administration" ("me sometí al igual que toda mi promoción militar a las evaluaciones pertinentes, siendo evaluados por un tribunal de evaluación y selección nombrado en la administración anterior").

On 31 December 2020, Bukele signed General Order No. 12/020 which promoted Merino to the rank of vice admiral, the highest rank in the Salvadoran Navy. Although the general order did not enter into effect until 1 January 2021, Merino began wearing vice admiral insignia the day the general order was signed. On 1 January 2026, Merino was promoted to admiral after a 2024 reform created the rank.

=== COVID-19 pandemic ===
On 21 March 2020, the Salvadoran government implemented a mandatory 30-day nationwide lockdown to prevent the spread of COVID-19. The armed forces and the National Civil Police were responsible for enforcing the lockdowns. Merino publicly announced exceptions to the lockdown orders which were decided by the Salvadoran government. He told citizens to be ready to present their national identity documents to expedite the military's and police's processes in verifying that they qualify for the exceptions. In July 2020, Merino criticized the Legislative Assembly for refusing to allocate the government resources to combat the COVID-19 pandemic, warning that COVID-19 cases would only continue to rise. He also questioned the National Republican Alliance's proposal to implement quarantines within the country's municipalities, arguing that the party had previously opposed Bukele's proposals to implement quarantines.

On 30 September 2020, Merino signed Accord No. 136 which established the Nu Tanesi Star, a medal awarded for actions which occurred during the COVID-19 pandemic and tropical storms Amanda and Cristobal. On 28 October 2020, he awarded the Nu Tanesi Star to ten ministry of defense officials, including himself. Merino defended receiving the award, stating that "I did not give it [the award] to myself. It was given to me by the Joint Chiefs of Staff, who did all the preparation, we only sign the document" ("No la he dado yo [la condecoración]. La ha dado el Estado Mayor Conjunto, quien hace toda la elaboración, nosotros solo firmamos el documento").

On 12 March 2021, Merino, Arriaza, and Minister of Health Francisco Alabí received a shipment of 33,600 COVID-19 vaccines at the Saint Óscar Arnulfo Romero y Galdámez International Airport which were delivered to the country by UNICEF. Merino received the AstraZeneca COVID-19 vaccine on 29 March 2021 at the San Salvador Military Hospital along with other officials of the ministry of defense. He also confirmed that over 13,800 members of the armed forces and National Civil Police had been vaccinated.

== Personal life ==
Merino had a son, frigate Lieutenant Gerardo Antonio Merino Marroquín. During his tenure as Naval Chief of the General Staff, Merino was accused of having given favors to his son. On 11 September 2018, he was charged with nepotism alleging that he acquired slots in the Trident group (the navy's elite unit) for his children, but the charges were never pursued. Merino's son and two other military personnel died on 2 December 2021 when their Beechcraft 58 Barron crashed into the Pacific Ocean.

== Awards and decorations ==
Merino has received the following military awards.

El Salvador

- 1980–1992 Military Campaign Medal (VI)
- Gold Medal of Merit (x2) (1999 and 2009)
- Mare Nostrum Medal
- Nu Tanesi Star (2020)

Chile

- Minerva Medal

Nicaragua

- Medal of Honor to Naval Merit (2015)

Taiwan

- Medal of Honor

== See also ==
- Cabinet of Nayib Bukele
- List of current defense ministers

Political offices
Preceded by David Munguía Payés	Minister of National Defense; 2019–present	Incumbent
