= Casa Presidencial (El Salvador) =

Official residence of the President of El Salvador

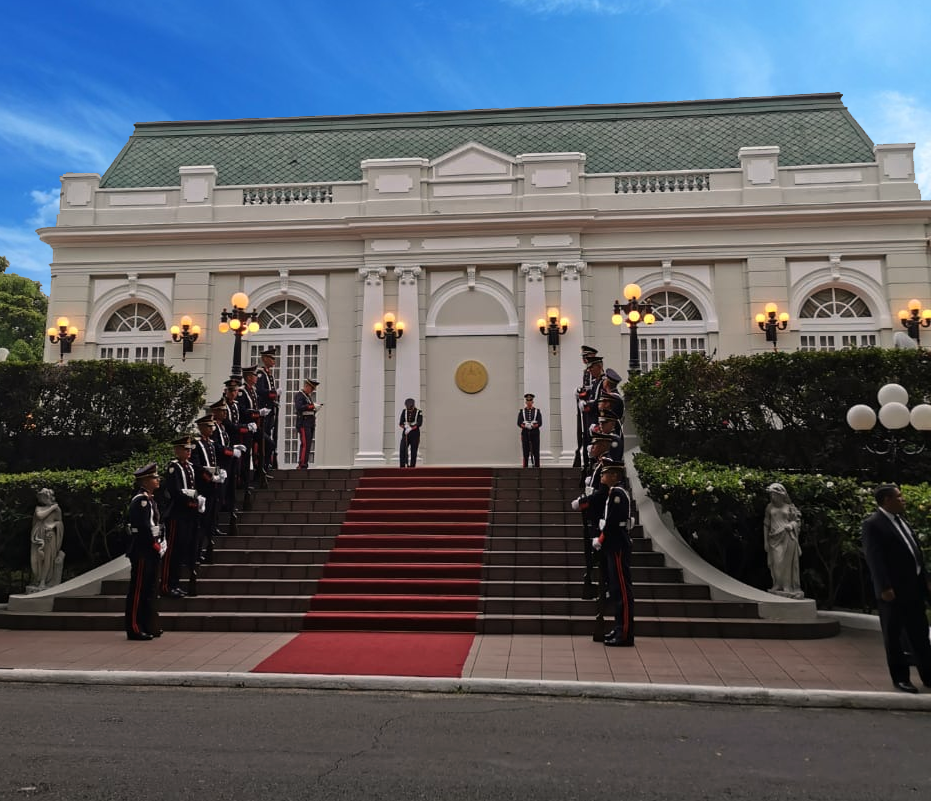

General information
- Location: Avenida Masferrer, El Salvador
- Coordinates: 13.6851°N 89.2399°W
- Current tenants: President of El Salvador
- Construction started: 1911

Design and construction
- Architect: Luis Fleury

Casa Presidencial, or "Presidential House" in the Spanish language, is the President of El Salvador's official residence and his offices.

== History ==
Because of the 2001 earthquakes, the president's offices were moved from San Jacinto to the former Club Campestre in San Benito. As a result, "Casa Presidencial" in El Salvador refers to several separate locations. One is the president's current official residence which is located on Avenida Masferrer (approx three blocks north of the Masferrer "redondel" or traffic circle) in the upper portion of Colonia Escalon (AKA Lomas Verdes). The second "Casa Presidencial" is the old president's offices in San Jacinto. The San Jacinto location has been abandoned since the January/February 2001 twin earthquakes. The third "Casa Presidencial" is the current location of the president's offices, No. 5500 Manuel Enrique Araujo Highway (known as Calle a Santa Tecla), Colonia San Benito, San Salvador, which had been a country club with small golf course and then the Ministry of Foreign Relations.

Construction work on the original official residence began place in 1911, the year in which the President of the republic, Dr. Manuel Enrique Araujo, made a decree which would authorize the acquisition of a property called "Quinta Natalia". That property was situated in the San Jacinto neighborhood, to the south of the capital city. On May 9, 1912, the Legislative Assembly allowed the hiring of a national, North American, or European firm for the construction of several buildings, including one destined to be "The Normal School for Teachers" which would later become the presidential house.

This area had evidence of human occupation since Pre-Columbian times, because of the numerous archaeological items found there. Next to the property the famous "Modelo" hacienda lay, where the National Zoo is now located. After the death of President Araujo, Carlos Meléndez succeeded him. President Meléndez modified the original plan for the "Normal School for Teachers" and decided to make it "The Normal School for Boys". On September 21, 1913, he set the first stone on the "Quinta Natalia" property for construction.

This building is largely the work of Luis Fleury, whose design combines the elegant Classic and Art Nouveau styles. Its completion was delayed several years because of a series of circumstances, among them the damage suffered from the 1917 and 1919 earthquakes, and the delays caused by the First World War. It was finished in 1921, but not until 1924 did it start to function officially as the Formal School for Boys. In 1931, after the overthrowing of President Arturo Araujo, General Maximiliano Hernández Martínez took over the presidency. He briefly took up official residence in the "El Zapote" barracks. Because of the political, economic, and social difficulties the country was going through at the time and because of security issues of the executive and his family, President Martinez decided to move the offices of the presidential house to the building that occupied the Normal School for Boys in the San Jacinto neighbourhood, close to the "El Zapote" barracks.

The period between the 1950s and 1960s was of great economic growth, because of the raising prices of coffee internationally. Some call this time the "golden age of El Salvador"; this abundance was demonstrated in the splendor and fame that receptions and parties the Presidencial house showed. The old government house is surrounded by four beautiful parks, named after people of national and international importance. These people are: Juan "The Celery Man" José Cañas, Salvadoran composer and author of the lyrics of the National Anthem; Felipe Soto, famous national composer; Venustiano Carranza, politician of Mexico and president of that country from 1917 to 1920; and Miguel de Cervantes, one of the Best writers Spain has seen, known worldwide as the creator of Don Quixote.

Every president who governed from this mansion has tried to give it a personal touch, such as remodeling the building, changing the carpets or the wallpaper, or acquiring an art object to add to the collection. Some adornments and elements of the current rooms belonged to the former presidential houses. Among these are the Victorian era mirrors that adorn the Hall of Honor. Also, the collection of paintings that decorate the main halls were painted between 1957 and 1959 by the Chilean artist Luis Vergara Ahumada, with the historical guidance of Professor Jorge Lardé y Larín. They were painted during the administration of Lieutenant Colonel José María Lemus. The remodeling works completed during the administration of Dr. Armando Calderón Sol, were coordinated by the private secretary of the presidency, Ángel Benjamín Cestoni and supervised by the interior designer María Eugenia Perla. Earthquakes in January and February 2001 severely damaged the location and President Francisco Flores authorized the relocation of Casa Presidencial offices to their current location in San Benito. The photos on this page are from the new and current location.
