= National Civil Police (El Salvador) =

National Civil Police of El Salvador Policía Nacional Civil de El Salvador
- Emblem of the PNC

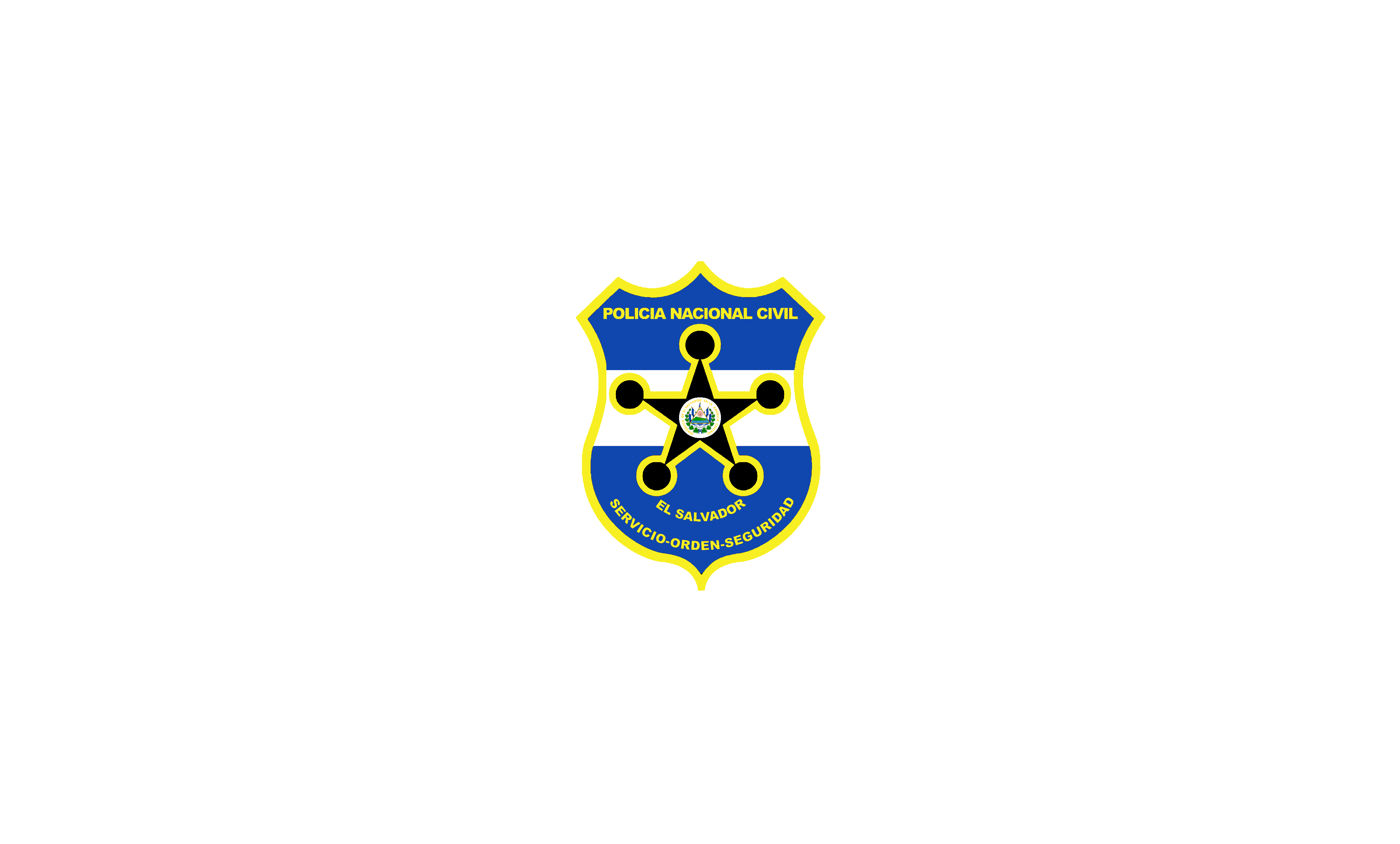
- Flag of the PNC
- Common name: National Civil Police
- Abbreviation: PNC
- Motto: Servicio, Orden, Seguridad (Service, Order, Safety)

Agency overview
- Formed: January 16, 1992
- Preceding agency: National Police
- Employees: 34,000

Jurisdictional structure
- National agency: El Salvador
- Federal agency: El Salvador
- Operations jurisdiction: El Salvador
- The PNC covers the Salvadoran territory.
- Governing body: Ministry of Justice and Public Security
- Constituting instrument: Article 159 of the Constitution of El Salvador
- General nature: Federal law enforcement; Civilian police

Operational structure
- Headquarters: San Salvador, El Salvador
- Commissioners responsible: Vacant, Director general; César Baldemar Flores Murillo, Sub-Director general
- Divisions: 5: Traffic; Tourism; General Inspection; Community; ANSP
- Bureaus: 6: Crime Stoppers; Emergencies; Police Solvency; Haremos Justicia; Anti-Extorsions; Complaints

Website
- www.pnc.gob.sv

The National Civil Police of El Salvador (Spanish: Policía Nacional Civil de El Salvador), also known as PNC, is the national civilian police of El Salvador. Although the National Civil Police is not part of the Armed Forces of El Salvador (Army, Navy, and Air Force), it constitutes along with them the "Civilian Force". It was created after the Peace Accords were signed at Chapultepec Castle in Mexico City on January 16, 1992, and began the operations on February 1, 1993, in order to guarantee the order, safety, and the public tranquility for every single corner of El Salvador. The PNC is a replacement of the National Police of El Salvador.

== History ==
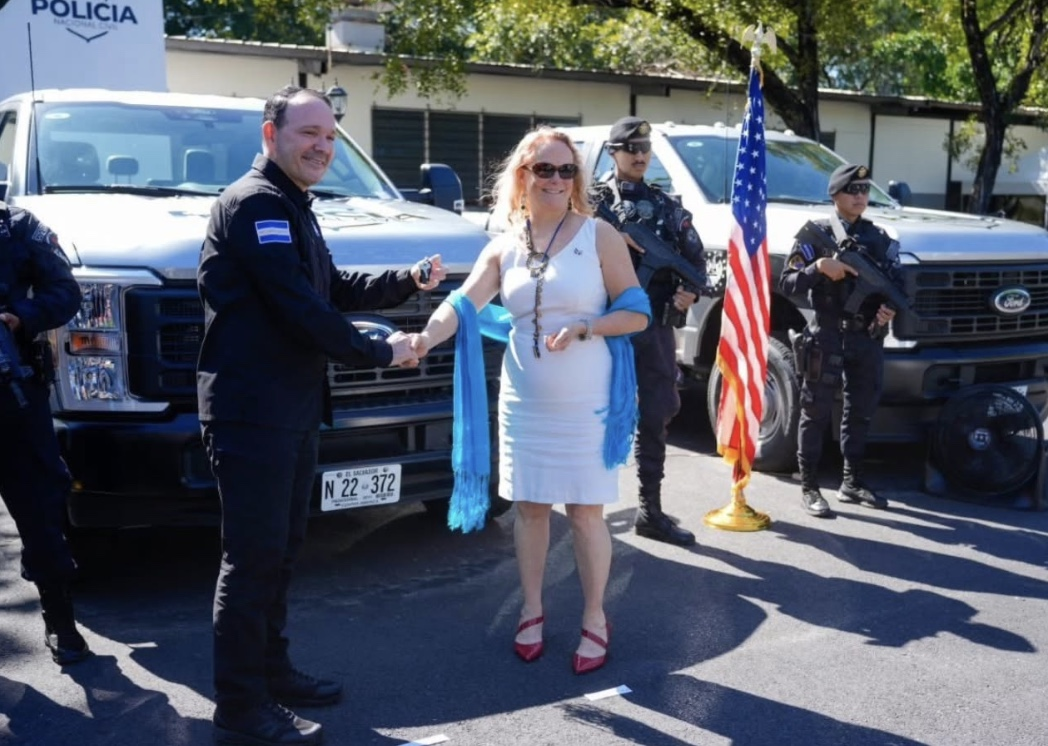
Security minister Gustavo Villatoro meeting with U.S interim ambassador Naomi Fellows.

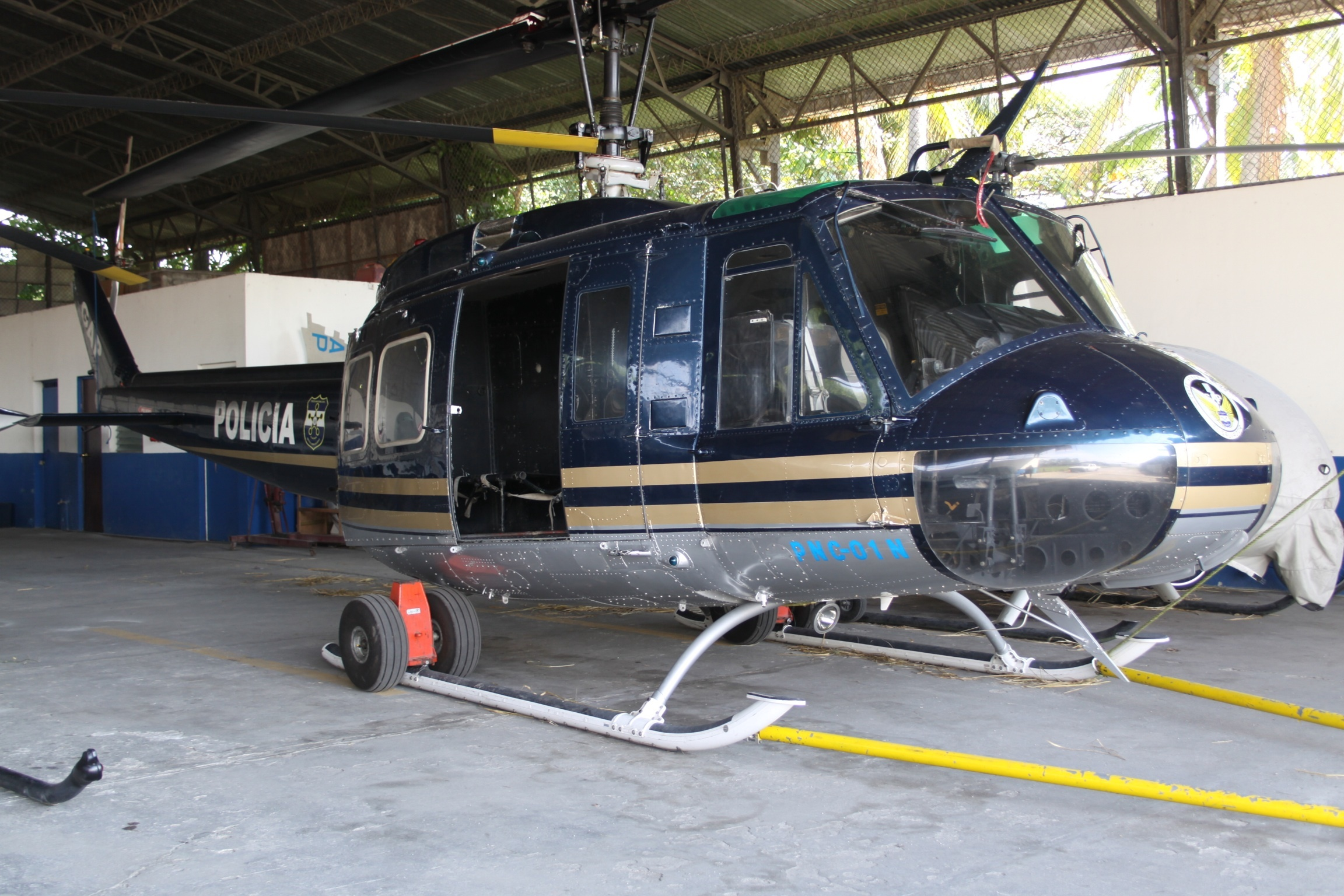
A Bell UH-1H helicopter of the National Civil Police

In 1867 the National Police (Policía Nacional) was established. Between 1884 and 1889 the Rural Police and Mounted Police developed from the private armies of wealthy landowners. By 1906, the police forces of other major cities were administratively connected to the police of San Salvador. The National Guard (Guardia Nacional), modeled on the Spanish Civil Guard, was founded in 1912 for rural policing, especially to protect coffee and fruit plantations. In 1926 the Treasury Police was founded as a customs and frontier guard force. A militia called the Civil Guard was established by President Maximiliano Hernández Martínez in 1932, which along with the National Guard took part in La Matanza. This structure remained in place through the 1980s: at the end of the Salvadoran Civil War law enforcement bodies in El Salvador included the National Police, the Treasury Police, and the National Guard, and all were under the Armed Forces. They were subordinated to the Public Security Branch of the Ministry of Defense.

According to the Truth Commission for El Salvador, these police agencies perpetrated many human rights abuses during the civil war. The civil war ended with the Chapultepec Peace Accords, which sets limitations on the involvement of the military in internal security and set expectations for the respect of human rights by security forces. Establishing civilian control of law enforcement agencies was a central tenet of the peace accords which ended the war only after the government and the guerrillas agreed to create a new National Civil Police, incorporating both former police and ex-insurgents as well as a large proportion of previous non-combatants into its ranks. The office of U.S. Senate Majority Whip Alan Cranston played a key role in brokering that final agreement, which included the U.S. Department of Justice taking the lead among international actors in establishing the new force.

The decree establishing the National Civil Police (PNC) was published on 10 August 1992, and it began operations as the primary law enforcement agency in March 1993, at which point José Maria Monterrey was appointed as the first Director General of the PNC. In the 1990s the government attributed El Salvador’s high murder rates (65 out of every 100,000 people) to increasing gang related activity. Under the administration of President Francisco Flores, the PNC attempted to crack down on gangs as part of a policy called Mano Dura or "Iron Fist". According to El Salvador's current constitution, the National Civil Police is the only force in charge of keeping order, security and public tranquility in the country, with different functions from the army. As part of the peace process, the National Guard and the Treasury Police were supposed to be abolished immediately; it took some time, but eventually was accomplished.

Despite the peace accords setting strict limits on the involvement of the military in the PNC, a retired military general, Francisco Ramon Salinas Rivera, was hired as the Director of the PNC in 2012. however, due to his ties with the military, the Supreme court viewed his appointment as violating the peace accords, and he was removed from office. Rivera was replaced by Howard Augusto Cotto Castaneda in 2014, two years after his initial appointment was called into question.

=== Salvadoran gang crackdown ===
Beginning on 25 March 2022, three days of gang-related violence occurred that left 87 people dead. In response, President Bukele asked the Salvadoran parliament to ratify a state of emergency. On 26 March, Bukele also ordered the police and army to initiate mass-arrests against those responsible for the violence.

A day later, the Legislative Assembly approved a "State of Emergency" that gives legal coverage to arrest any citizen suspected to be a gang member even with no proof. In addition, the Legislative Assembly also approved reforms to increase the maximum sentence for gang member from nine to 45 years in prison and punish the dissemination of gang messages, including independent journalism talking about the gang crisis, with up to 15 years in prison.

The law was directed against those who "mark" their territories with acronyms of the gangs, a practice that gang members use to intimidate, and threaten with death those who denounce them to the authorities. The Directorate of Penal Centers began to erase the graffiti that the gangs use to mark the territory in which they operate.

The Mara Salvatrucha (MS-13) and Barrio 18 gangs, among others, were estimated in 2022 to have around some 70,000 members, and as of August 2023, around 72,000 suspected gang members have been sent to prison as a part of the government crackdown on the gangs.

== Organization and responsibilities ==
According to the Chapultepec Peace Accords the PNC should not be connected to, or under the influence of any aspect of the Military forces. Within the PNC the Director General is at the top of the hierarchy. The President of the Republic of El Salvador has the power to appoint and replace the Director General of the PNC as they see fit; and under certain circumstances, such as a violation of human rights, the Legislator can suggest and enforce the removal of a Director General of the PNC.

The Director General is responsible for hiring within the PNC, implementing public security policies, and drafting the PNC’s budget. Additionally, the Director General oversees six main subdirectories: Public Security, Investigations, Specialized Operative Areas, Land transportation, Rural Police, and Administration and Finances. The Deputy Director General is the second highest position in the PNC, overseeing the Deputy Directors of Investigations, Public Security, Administration, Intelligence, and Operational and Specialized Areas. The Inspector General (who reports to the Director General of the PNC) monitors the PNC for violations of human rights and the Peace Accords. The PNC also contains the Disciplinary Investigation Unit, the Control Unit, and the Internal Affairs Unit which all hold members of the PNC accountable.

Members of the PNC are organized into rank categories which contribute to the hierarchical structure of the institution. Police officers, Corporals and Sergeants are at the “Basic Level”; Sub-inspectors, Inspectors, and Chief Inspector fall within the “Executive Level”; and the “Superior Level” consists of the Sub-Commissioners and Commissioners.

The National Academy of Public Security (ANSP) is the training academy of the National Civil Police, where recruits graduate from before becoming police officers. In order to receive certain promotions or work on specialized units, PNC officers must successfully pass courses and exams associated with the potential position.

== Personnel and training ==
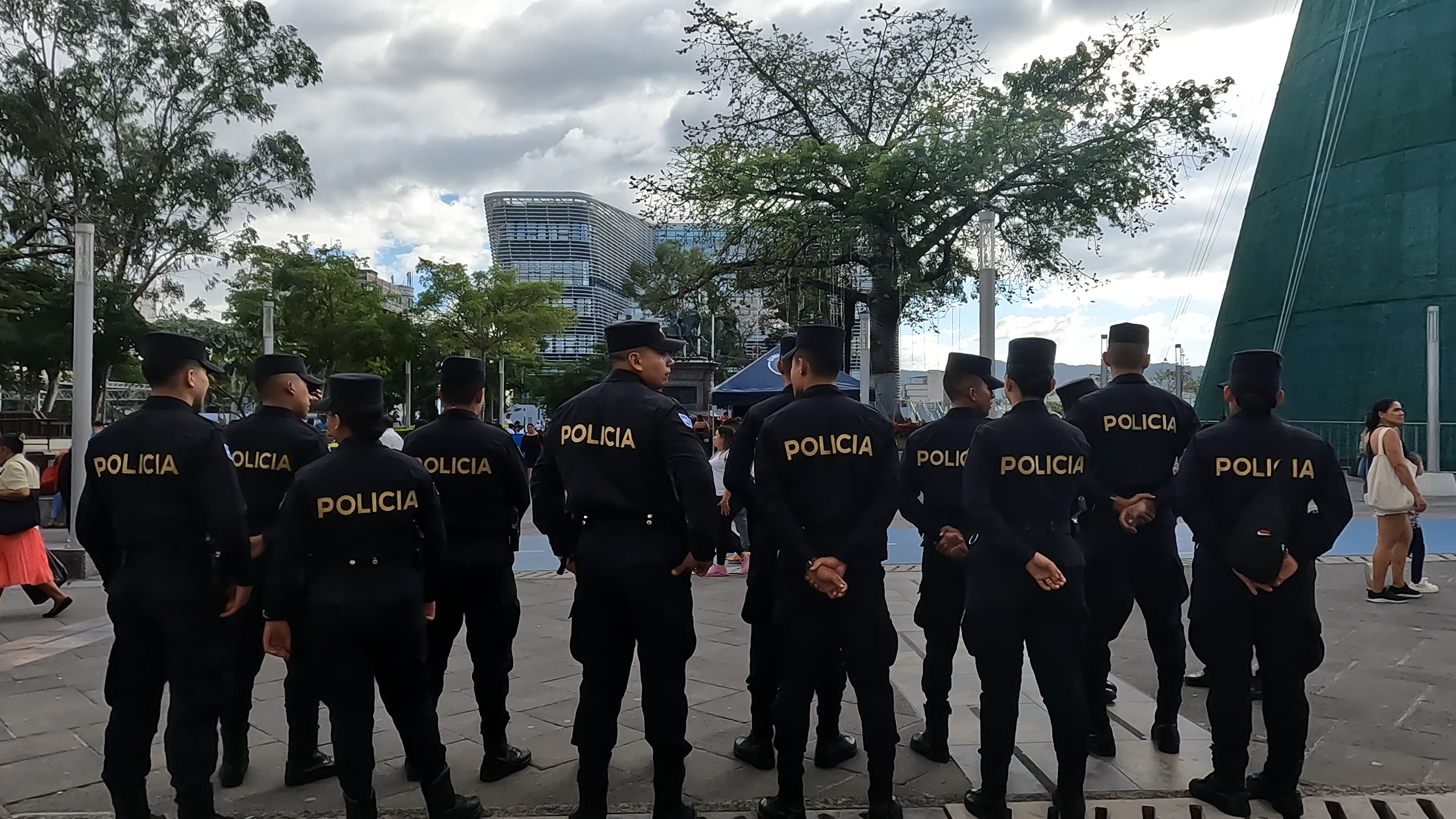
Members of the PNC in Historic Downtown San Salvador in 2025

In order to enter the PNC as an officer, citizens are required to successfully complete training at the Mauricio Antonio Arriaza Chicas National Academy of Public Security (ANSP). Officers graduate the ANSP with training in security and human rights. Throughout the course of their career, officers are also receive additional training in the newly emerging aspects of law enforcement. In order to receive certain promotions or work on specialized units, PNC officers must successfully pass courses and exams associated with the potential position.

== Equipment ==
=== Weapons ===
Name	Type	Quantity	Origin	Notes
S&W 459	Handgun		United States	Used by patrol officers but not all of them.
P227	Handgun		Germany	All its variants. Used By soldiers and special forces.
P226	Handgun		Germany	All its variants including the SIG Sauer X Six SIG P226 X Six. Used by soldiers and special forces.
M9	Handgun		United States	
CZ 75	Handgun		Czech Republic	
92FS	Handgun		Italy	
Px4 Storm	Handgun		Italy	
SW1911	Handgun		United States	
IWI 941	Handgun		Israel	
FN P35	Handgun		Belgium	
MP5	Sub-machine gun		Germany	MP5SD3, MP5A3, MP5A2, MP5, MP5A1, MP5K and Heckler & Koch MP5K-PDW.
40S&W SAF	Sub-machine gun		Chile	
Maxim Defense PDX	Personal defense weapon		United States	
HK33	Assault rifle		Germany	Including HK53 variant
M4	Assault rifle		United States	M4 Carbine, Colt M4A1, Colt M4, Colt M4 (original 1993 version), M4 (Colt Model 933), Colt M4 (M16A2 sights burst and full auto)
T65	Assault rifle		Taiwan	
M16	Assault rifle		United States	XM16E1, M16A1, M16A2, M16A3, M16A4, M16A1 with A2 handguards. M16A2 (Model 711, Model 715 and Model 720 (Burst fire/single fire)). Some M16A1's have M16A2's brass defectors, XM16E1. M16A2 (Model 645).
IMI Galil	Assault rifle		Israel	Galil AR, Galil SAR, Galil SAR339, Micro Galil
Galil ACE	Assault rifle		Colombia; Israel	ACE 21, ACE 22, ACE 23 (5.56×45mm NATO), ACE 32 (7.62×39mm), ACE 52, ACE 53 (7.62×51mm NATO).
IWI ARAD	Assault rifle		Israel	
AK-47	Assault rifle		Soviet Union	Used Since 2014.
AKM	Assault rifle		Soviet Union	Used Since 2014.
CAR-15	Carbine Rifle		United States	Colt Model 933, XM177, GAU-5/A (Colt Model 610), XM177E1 (Colt Model 609), XM177E2 (Colt Model 629), Colt Model 653 (M16A1 Carbine), Colt Model 653 (M16A1 Carbine), Colt Model 654 (M16A1 Carbine), Colt Model 727 (M16A2 carbine), Colt Model 733 (M16A2 Commando). M16A2 SMG Model 635.
MPi-KM	Assault rifle		East Germany	Used since 2014.
Pistol Mitralieră model 1963/1965	Assault rifle		Romania	Recovered from Gang members.
AK-63	Assault rifle		Hungary	Used Since 2014.
SIG Sauer SSG 3000	Sniper rifle		Germany	Used by Police Reaction Group (PRG) and now by the recently activated
SIG M400	Assault Rifle		Germany	In February 2018, the director of the National Civil Police of El Salvador, Howard Cotto, announced the creation of the Specialized Police Tactical Unit (UTEP), which merges the Specialized Reaction Force El Salvador (FES) and the Group of Special Police Operations (GOPES). The UTEP replaces the Police Reaction Group, whose official dissolution was announced this afternoon. The last commander of this unit was Julio César Flores Castro, under whose direction the disappearance of the police Carla Ayala occurred.
SR-556	Carbine		United States	
CK-901	Carbine		United States	

The Salvadoran police uses the same kind of small arm types in all their branches. It also uses telescopic sights, Aimpoint T2 Micro, Ohuhu OH-RG-SC Reflex Sights (panoramic sights), EOTech EXPS 3-0 sights, Barska Holographic Reflex Red Dot Sight, Ozark Rihno Tactical Sights, Trijicon MRO-C sights, EOTech 512..A65 sights, Vortex Optics StrikeFire II sights, Burrist Fast BFire3, Tasco Red Dot Sights, CVLIFE Optics Hunting Rifle Scope 2.5x40e red and green illuminated crosshair mount sights in every single assault rifle of every branch of the police department.

== Combatting gang violence ==
El Salvador was classified ranked among the most violent countries in the world. In 1999 El Salvador’s homicide rate (65/100,000 people) was the highest in the region. President Francisco Flores asserted that the increase in gang related activity was the cause of increasing violence and instituted the Mano Dura or “Iron Fist” approach to decreasing gang activity. The Iron Fist approach to gang activity weakened the requirements for PNC officers to arrest and detain citizens. One law, created in 2003 under the Flores administration, made gang membership illegal; essentially allowing PNC officers to arrest citizens suspected of gang activity.

In 2009 the election of President Mauricio Funes was the beginning of not only a major political transition but also a significant shift in strategies for combating gang activities. Funes’ election marked the first time that the leftist political party known as the Farabundo Marti National Liberation Front (FMLN) had won the presidency since it was founded at the end of the Civil War in 1992 by marxist guerrillas. The Funes administration’s community and peace based approach to gang activity was in sharp contrast to his predecessor’s Iron Fist approach. Under the Funes administration, two prominent gangs (MS-13 and the 18th Street Gang) signed a truce in 2012 in an attempt to decrease intra-gang warfare. Initially the government stated that they did not participate in the truce negotiations. However, the government later announced it would accommodate and support the truce after as many as 30 high profile gang members were moved out of maximum security prisons and granted increased visitation rights. Thus, the government did not formally negotiate with criminals, but rather took steps to encourage the peace process. The FMLN won the Presidency again in 2014 as Sanchez Ceren (the Vice President in the Funes administration) took office. Ceren's administration quickly demonstrated their intention to depart with Funes’ strategies by rejecting the truce and prosecuting officials who were involved in the process. The political change from Funes to Ceren led to a shift back to more aggressive methods of combating gang violence by implementing policies reminiscent of the Mano Dura years. The resurgence of the “iron fist” approach to policing gang activity was part of Ceren’s plan, “El Salvador Seguro”. With the truce abandoned in 2014, violence was rising again; by the end of 2015 El Salvador’s homicide rate (105/100,000) was not only the highest in the region, but the highest in the world.

In accordance with “El Salvador Seguro” the PNC implemented emergency measures in 2016 in attempt to reduce the homicide rate. Law reforms implemented as part of the PNC’s emergency measures lead to the designation of gangs as terrorist organizations; effectively allowing the police to target and arrest citizens suspected of being gang members, or participating in gang related activity, with even less evidence. While the harassment and mass incarceration of certain citizens based on limited evidence and suspected affiliation with a gang violates due process and other aspects of human rights, it is technically legal under the 2016 law reforms. The return to more aggressive methods of combating gang activity also corresponded with an increase in extrajudicial killings. The 2016 law reforms did not grant PNC officers the power to legally execute suspects; however, officers avoid consequences for extrajudicial activities due to a combination of a weak judicial system and support from Mano Dura policies.

== Controversy and corruption ==
The homicide rate dropped from 105/100,000 in 2015 to 60/100,000 in 2017, however this drop came with an uptick in accusations of PNC officers abusing their power. One of the most significant issue with the PNC’s use of force is the increase in reports of extrajudicial executions. In September 2018 the Inter-American Commission on Human Rights (IACHR) received reports of the PNC using extrajudicial killings to curb gang activity from the Human Rights Institute of José Simeón Cañas Central American University and the NGO Passionist Social Service. By August 2017, the ratio of presumed gang members to PNC officers killed in confrontations was 73 to 1; the IACHR asserts that the ratio demonstrates an abuse of force by the PNC. Early in 2018 the PNC shut down an elite police unit after it was accused of police brutality via extrajudicial execution of suspected gang members. Over the course of six months the Special Reaction Forces (FES) killed 43 gang members, causing people to question the legality of the PNC Unit’s actions. Following the closure of the FES, the PNC created a new elite police unit with essentially the same responsibilities and jurisdiction as the FES called the Jaguars. Despite facing charges of extrajudicial killings, former members of the FES were allowed to join the Jaguars. In another example, a text conversation between PNC officers, leaked by an anonymous officer, discusses strategies for hiding executions; effectively demonstrating the presence of illegal practices within the PNC.

A UN report by Agnes Callamard states that the vast majority of officers under investigation (about 92%) are back on duty within 3 days. In 2016 the Director General of the PNC, Mauricio Landaverde, stated that “All members of the PNC that have to use weapons against criminals due to their work as officers should do so with complete confidence. The PNC and the government will protect them”. Landaverde, in this case, seemingly promotes the use of extralegal action and promises not to hold officers accountable for potential abuses of power. In one case, a Judge established that at least one of eight people killed during a shootout in San Blas was the victim of an illegal execution at the hands of the police. However, because the prosecution could not identify which specific officer was directly responsible for the execution, all charges against the eight PNC officers on trial were dropped.

== See also ==
- Crime in El Salvador
