= Bukele (surname) =

Bukele is a surname, which most often refers to Nayib Bukele (born 1981), the 81st and current president of El Salvador since 2019. Other notable people with the surname include:

- Armando Bukele Kattán (1944–2015), Salvadoran businessman, intellectual, and religious leader, father of Nayib Bukele
- Gabriela Rodríguez de Bukele (born 1985), Salvadoran educator and prenatal psychologist, wife of Nayib Bukele
- Ibrajim Bukele Ortez (born 1989), Salvadoran businessman, brother of Nayib Bukele
- Karim Bukele Ortez (born 1986), Salvadoran businessman, brother of Nayib Bukele
- Yusef Bukele Ortez (born 1989), Salvadoran businessman, brother of Nayib Bukele
- Yamil Bukele Pérez (born 1978), Salvadoran-Colombian basketball player, half-brother of Nayib Bukele
- Xavier Zablah Bukele, Salvadoran politician, cousin of Nayib Bukele
- Momolu Duwalu Bukele, Liberian inventor of the Vai language's writing system
