= Ibrajim Bukele =

Salvadoran businessman and politician

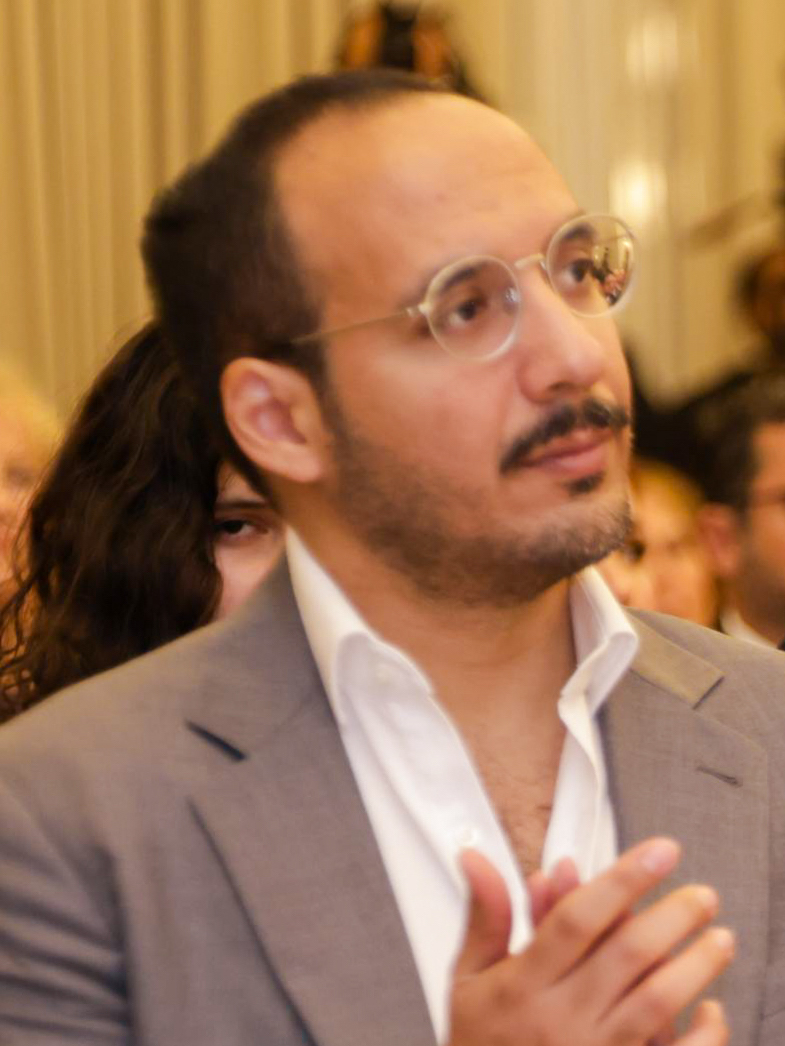
- Bukele in 2024
- Born: Ibrajim Antonio Bukele Ortez; 22 September 1989 (age 36); El Salvador
- Education: Panamerican School
- Occupation: Businessman
- Organization(s): Global Motors, S.A de C.V.
- Father: Armando Bukele
- Relatives: Nayib Bukele (brother); Karim Bukele (brother); Yusef Bukele (brother)

Ibrajim Antonio Bukele Ortez (born 22 September 1989) is a Salvadoran businessman. He is a younger brother of and advisor to Nayib Bukele, the incumbent president of El Salvador.

== Early life ==
Ibrajim Antonio Bukele Ortez was born on 22 September 1989 in El Salvador. His father was Armando Bukele Kattán and his mother is Olga Marina Ortez. Ibrajim has a twin brother, Yusef, and has two older brothers, Nayib and Karim.

Bukele graduated from the Panamerican School in San Salvador.

== Business ventures ==
Bukele became the CEO of Global Motors, S.A de C.V. (also known as Yamaha Motor El Salvador) on 20 July 2017, succeeding his brother Karim. In October 2023, the El Faro digital newspaper alleged that, from 2017 to 2019, the company secretly received 16 checks from the Banco Hipotecario amounting to US$118,143.23 which supposedly came then-President Salvador Sánchez Cerén's black budget. Bukele became the president of NRA, S.A. de C.V. in 2018, succeeding Claudia Rodríguez de Guevara.

== Political career ==
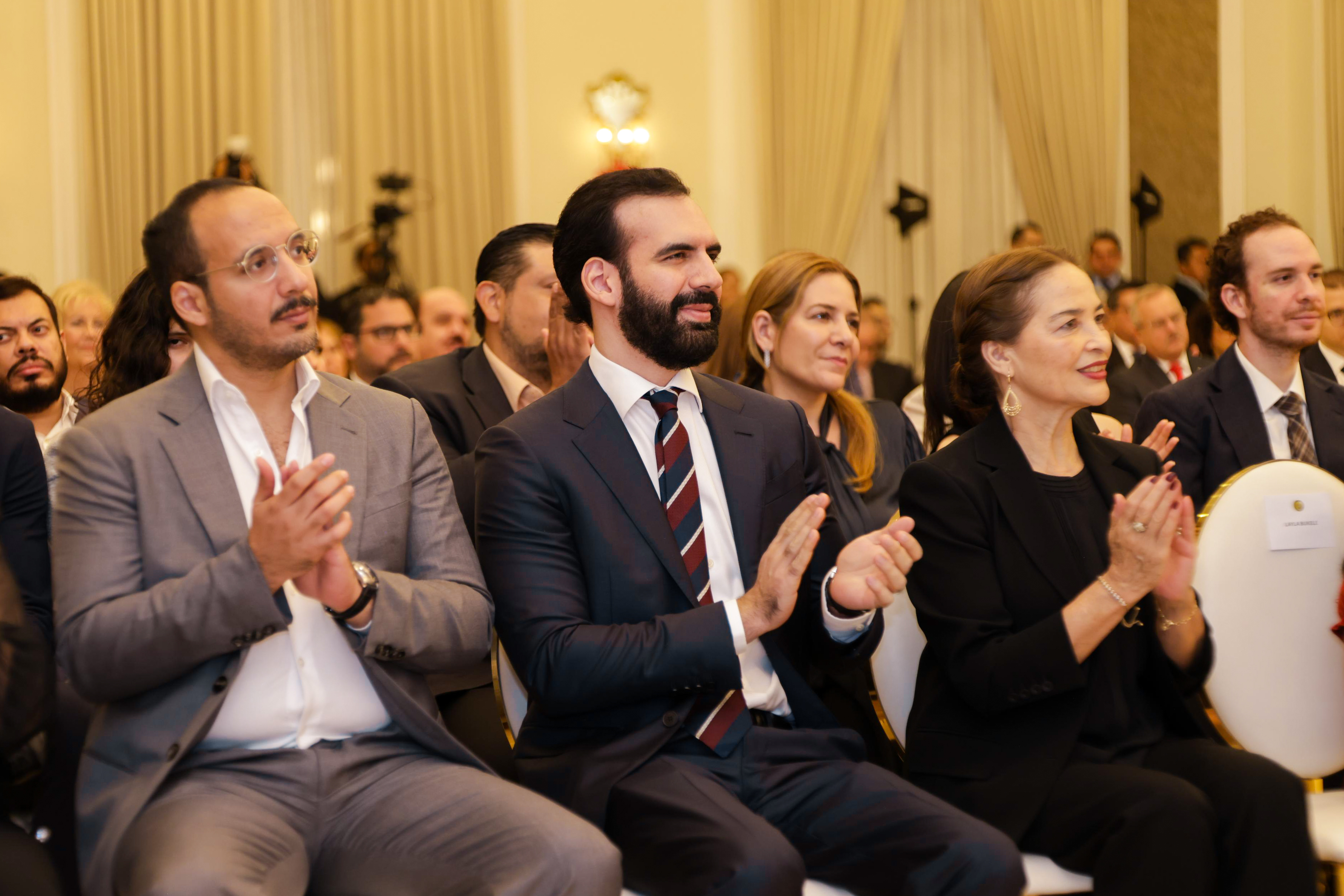
Bukele (left) with his brothers and mother in 2024

In April 2020, Fabio Castillo, a former secretary of the Farabundo Martí National Liberation Front (FMLN), stated that Bukele had "an incredible influence over the affairs of the state that [he] should not have" ("una influencia increíble en los asuntos del estado que [él] no [debe] tener").

In 2019, before Nayib assumed office as president of El Salvador, Bukele conducted 270 interviews for government positions regarding the economy and sent a list of candidates to Nayib for consideration. In 2020, Bukele was named by Nayib as the president of a committee tasked with managing US$2 billion of emergency COVID-19 relief funds.

In August 2019, Bukele accompanied Minister of Foreign Affairs Alexandra Hill Tinoco on a diplomatic visit to Turkey where he met with the Foreign Economic Relations Board of Turkey. In July 2022, Bukele met with Hong Sang Jo, the president of Samsung Latin America.

In May and June 2021, Bukele and his twin brother Yusef met with foreign investors to discuss the possibility of introducing digital currency or cryptocurrency in El Salvador. Shortly afterwards, on 9 June 2021, the Legislative Assembly voted to pass a bill to make bitcoin legal tender in El Salvador.

== Personal life ==
Bukele married Samantha on 19 November 2022.

In 2021, Attorney General Raúl Melara launched an investigation into Bukele, Ibrajim, and Karim regarding allegations of arbitrary acts, document falsification, and embezzlement. The investigation, known as Operation Cathedral which alleged the three of being the leaders of a "complex network of corruption", was suspended following Melara's removal by the Legislative Assembly and his replacement by Rodolfo Delgado.
