= Yusef Bukele =

Salvadoran businessman, politician, and economist

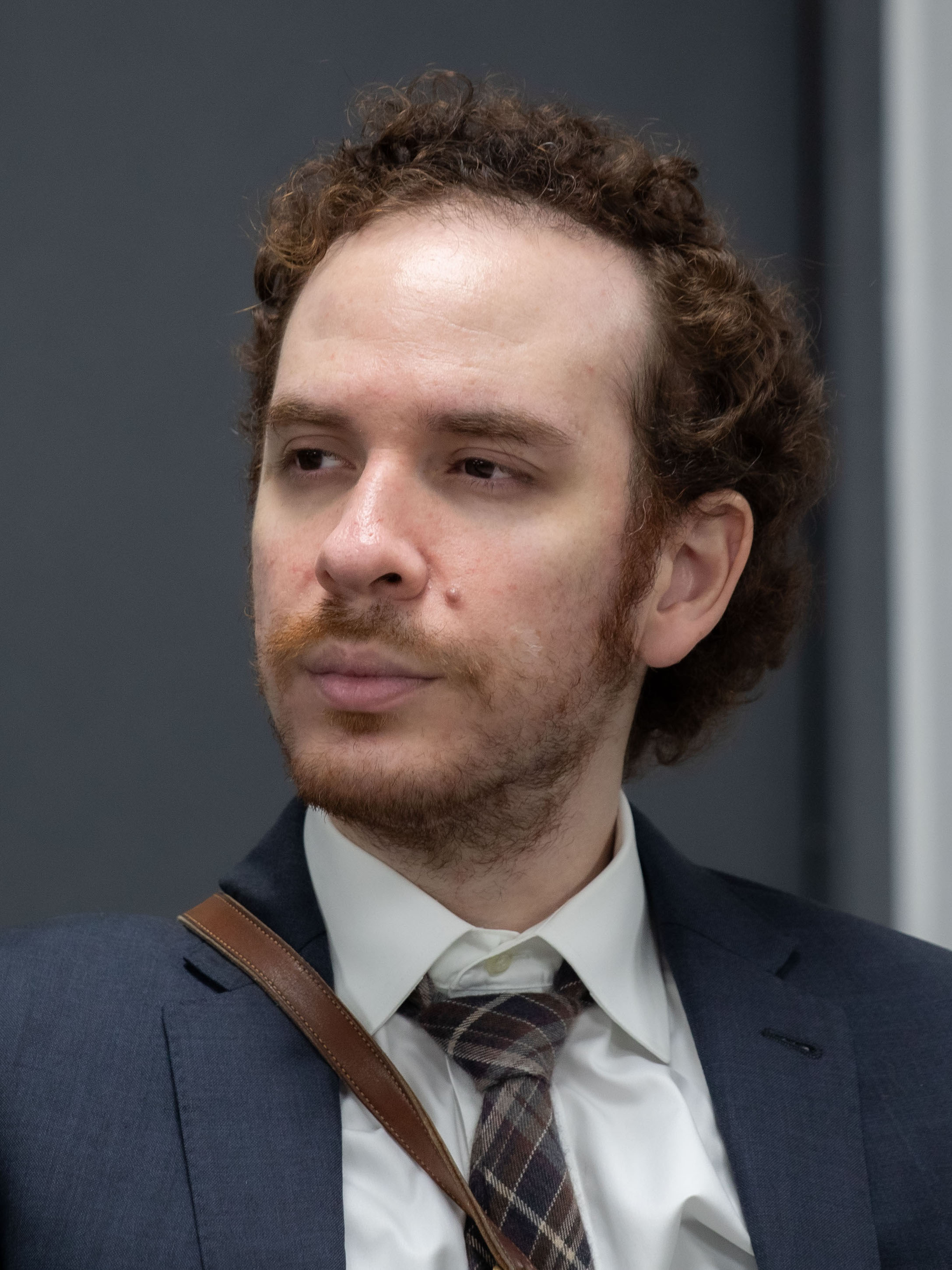
- Bukele in 2023
- Born: Yusef Alí Bukele Ortez; 22 September 1989 (age 36); El Salvador
- Education: Central American University
- Occupations: Businessman, politician, economist
- Political party: Nuevas Ideas
- Partner: Pamela Abarco
- Father: Armando Bukele
- Relatives: Nayib Bukele (brother); Karim Bukele (brother); Ibrajim Bukele (brother)

Yusef Alí Bukele Ortez (born 22 September 1989) is a Salvadoran businessman, politician, and economist. He is a younger brother of and advisor to Nayib Bukele, the current president of El Salvador. Bukele has served as one of Nayib's economic advisors and played a role in the adoption of bitcoin as legal tender in El Salvador.

== Early life ==
Yusef Alí Bukele Ortez was born on 22 September 1989 in El Salvador. His father was Armando Bukele Kattán and his mother is Olga Marina Ortez. Yusef has a twin brother, Ibrajim, and has two older brothers, Nayib and Karim. Additionally, Bukele has four half-sisters and two half-brothers from his father's side of the family.

Bukele graduated from the Central American University in 2014 with a degree in economics. While studying at the university, Bukele and three others published their thesis in economics: A Theoretical and Empirical Comparison of Neoclassical and Marxist Theory Regarding the Relationship between Skilled Labor, Productivity and Wages.

Bukele was a manager of Obermet S.A. de C.V. (also known as 4am Saatchi & Saatchi El Salvador) under his older brother Karim until 2018.

== Political career ==
=== Role in Nuevas Ideas and government ===
Before the 2019 presidential election, in which his older brother Nayib was the presidential candidate for the Grand Alliance for National Unity, Bukele believed that Nayib would win in the first round. Bukele added that "The factor to win, I believe, could be to defend the vote, in the case that they annul our votes, or in case they attack them, because it is evident that [the Nationalist Republican Alliance (ARENA)] and [the Farabundo Martí National Liberation Front (FMLN)] have united" ("El factor para ganar, creo yo, puede estar en la defensa del voto, en que nos anulen votos, o en el llenado de las actas, porque es evidente como Arena y el Frente se han unido"). On election day, Bukele led the Nuevas Ideas delegation (a political party founded by Nayib) at a voting center outside the International Fair and Convention Center. Nayib ultimately did win the election in the first round with 53 percent of the vote, an absolute majority.

When Nayib assumed office on 1 June 2019, Bukele was not named as one of Nayib's 16 cabinet members. Regardless, according to Luis Cardenal, a former president of the National Association of Private Enterprise (ANEP), Bukele is Nayib's primary economic advisor regarding affairs of private sector labor unions. In April 2020, Fabio Castillo, a former secretary of the FMLN, stated that Bukele had "an incredible influence over the affairs of the state that [he] should not have" ("una influencia increíble en los asuntos del estado que [él] no [debe] tener").

In 2020, Bukele was a popular choice to succeed Federico Anliker as secretary general of Nuevas Ideas, however, he declined to seek the position. Bukele told the El Faro digital newspaper that "It's nice for one be promoted, it shows the people's affection. But I have no intention of running for any party position. What you see on networks is the expression of the organic and natural nature of Nuevas Ideas" ("Es bonito que lo promuevan a uno, demuesta cariño de la gente. Pero no tengo ninguna intención de correr a ningún cargo partidario. Lo que ves en redes es la expresión de lo órganico y natural de Nuevas Ideas"). Instead of Bukele, Xavier Zablah Bukele, one of Bukele's cousins, succeeded Anliker as the leader of Nuevas Ideas on 2 March 2020.

Bukele accompanied Nayib on 26 October 2023 when the latter initiated the process to register his 2024 re-election campaign.

=== Adoption of bitcoin as legal tender ===
In May and June 2021, Bukele, his twin brother Ibrajim, and other Salvadoran officials met with foreign investors to discuss the possibility of introducing digital currency or cryptocurrency in El Salvador. During one meetings with U.S. cryptocurrency executive Jack Mallers, Bukele stated that he was working with the Salvadoran government to allow Salvadorans living abroad to send free remittances to family living in El Salvador, stating that "when you send money home they're [the government] not going to take fucking half of it". On 9 June 2021, the Legislative Assembly voted to pass a bill to make bitcoin legal tender in El Salvador which was in part drafted by Bukele. He publicly claimed that he helped influence Nayib to approve making bitcoin legal tender. In January 2022, Bukele met with Italian businessman Paolo Ardoino to discuss making debt subscription an avenue to finance the construction of Bitcoin City, a potential purchase of US$500 million in bitcoin, and the creating of bitcoin bonds.

== Personal life ==
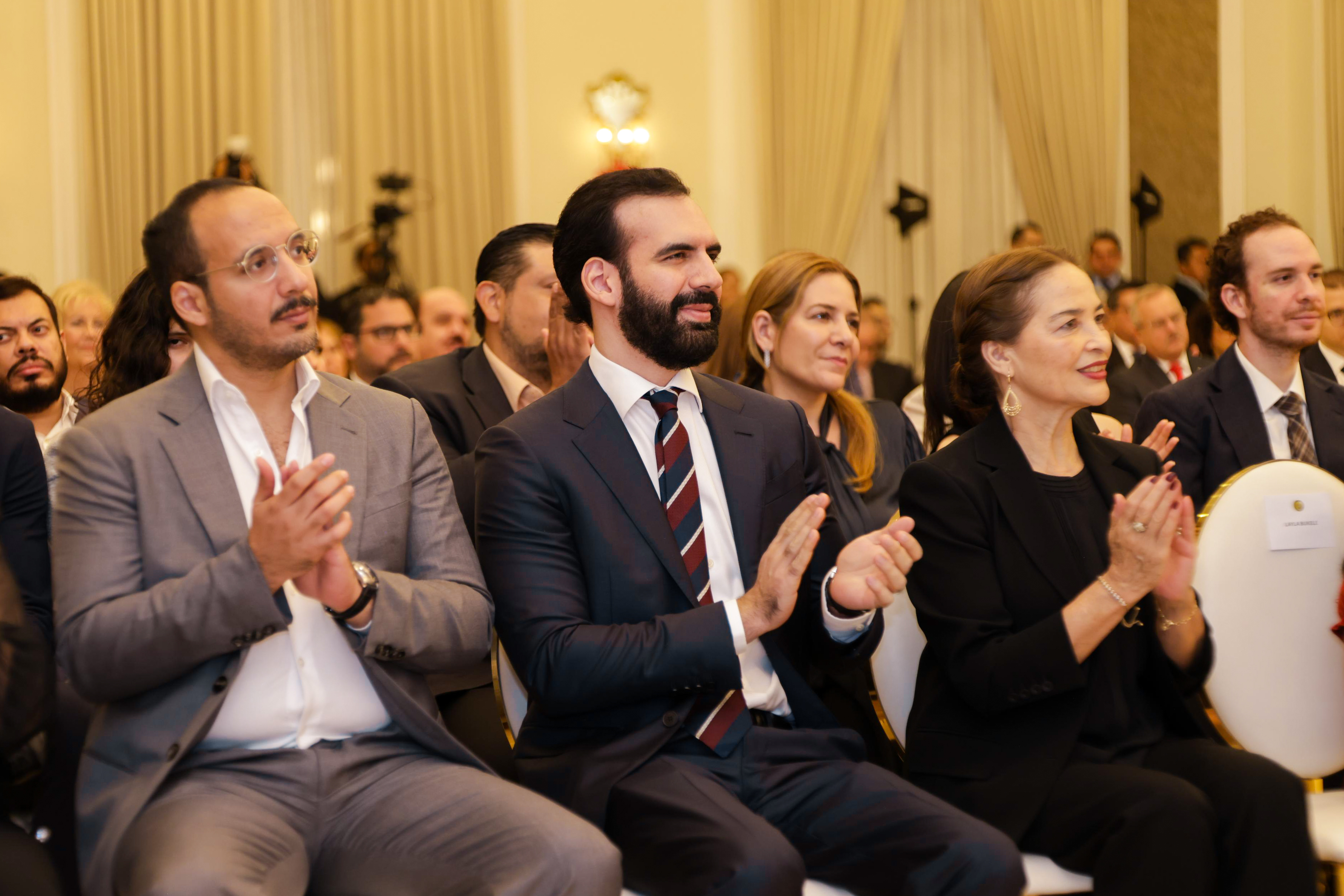
Bukele (far-right) with his brothers and mother in 2024

As of December 2019, Bukele is engaged to Pamela Abarco.

In 2021, Attorney General Raúl Melara launched an investigation into Bukele, Ibrajim, and Karim regarding allegations of arbitrary acts, document falsification, and embezzlement. The investigation, known as Operation Cathedral which alleged that the three were the leaders of a "complex network of corruption", was suspended following Melara's removal by the Legislative Assembly and his replacement by Rodolfo Delgado.

== Publications ==
Bukele authored one thesis during his studies at the Central American University regarding economics:

- A Theoretical and Empirical Comparison of Neoclassical and Marxist Theory Regarding the Relationship between Skilled Labor, Productivity and Wages (2015, Central American University; OCLC 9635053308)
