= Karim Bukele =

Salvadoran businessman and politician

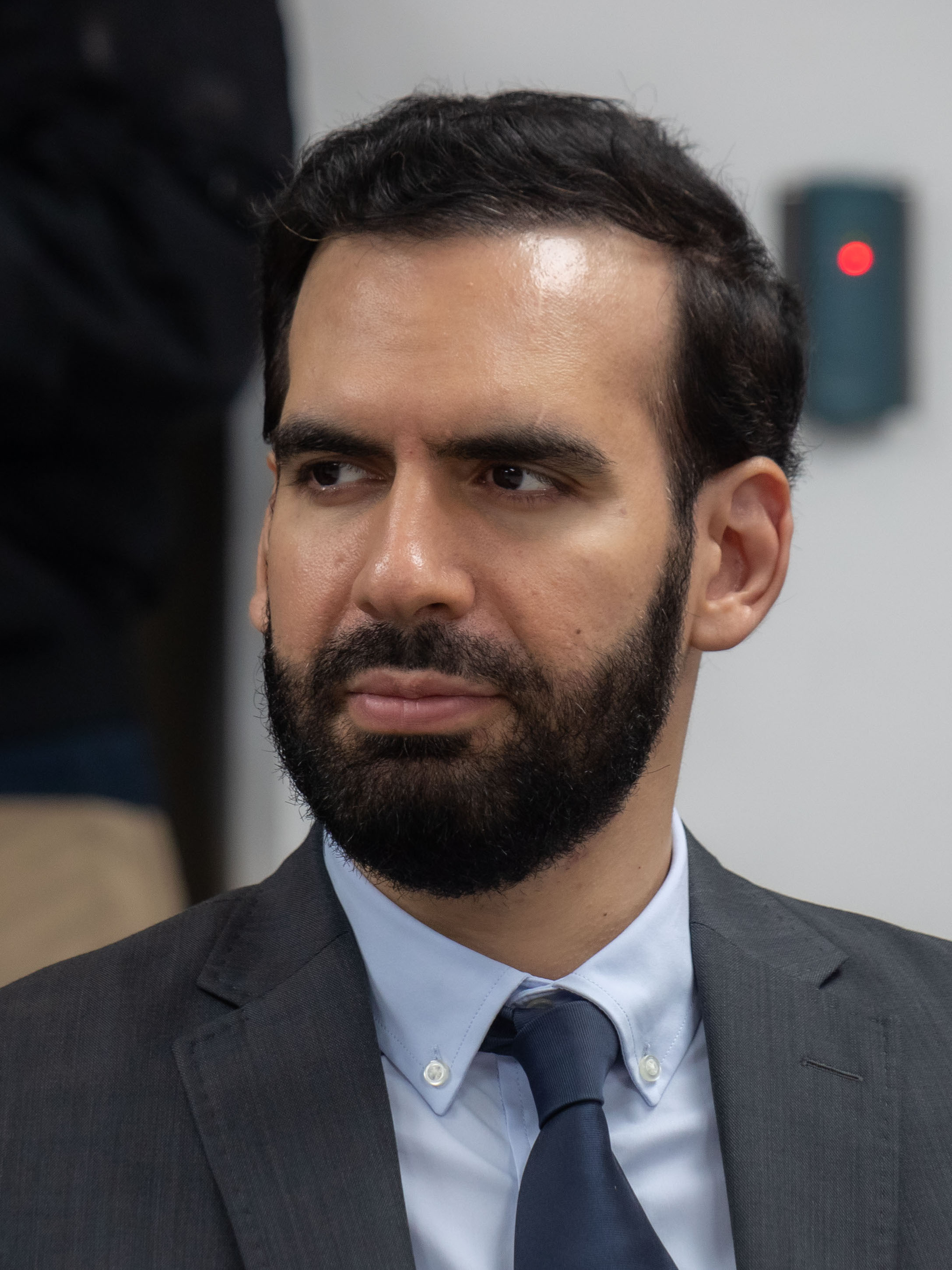
- Bukele in 2023
- Born: Karim Alberto Bukele Ortez; 10 March 1986 (age 40); El Salvador
- Occupations: Businessman, politician
- Organization(s): Obermet S.A. de C.V. Global Motors, S.A de C.V.
- Political party: Nuevas Ideas
- Father: Armando Bukele
- Relatives: Nayib Bukele (brother); Yusef Bukele (brother); Ibrajim Bukele (brother)

Karim Alberto Bukele Ortez (Spanish pronunciation: [kaˈɾim buˈkele]; born 10 March 1986) is a Salvadoran businessman and politician. He is a younger brother of and former presidential advisor to Nayib Bukele, the current president of El Salvador. Bukele has previously worked as Nayib's campaign manager during his 2015 and 2019 electoral campaigns as well as the campaign manager for the Nuevas Ideas political party in 2021. In late-2023, Bukele was considered a likely candidate to succeed Nayib as acting president in the event that he resigned ahead of the 2024 presidential election, however, Bukele denied that he would succeed Nayib.

== Early life ==
Karim Alberto Bukele Ortez was born on 10 March 1986 in El Salvador. His father was Armando Bukele Kattán and his mother is Olga Marina Ortez. Karim has an older brother, Nayib, and two younger twin brothers, Yusef and Ibrajim. In addition, Bukele also has four half-sisters and two half-brothers from his father's side of the family.

== Business ventures ==
In 2006, Bukele, Andrés García, Ernesto Castro, and Bukele's older brother Nayib co-founded Sociedad 503 S.A. de C.V., a company which operates restaurants, bars, and nightclubs. In April 2012, Bukele became the president of Obermet S.A. de C.V. (also known as 4am Saatchi & Saatchi El Salvador) and as its CEO since 2014. He was also one of the company's legal representatives. Bukele was the CEO of Global Motors, S.A de C.V. until 20 July 2017 when he was succeeded by his brother Ibrajim. In October 2023, the El Faro digital newspaper alleged that Global Motors, S.A de C.V. secretly received 16 checks from the Banco Hipotecario amounting to US$118,143.23 from 2017 to 2019. El Faro alleged that the checks came from then-President Salvador Sánchez Cerén's supposed black budget.

== Political career ==
=== Campaign manager ===
Bukele became a close advisor to his older brother Nayib during the latter's term as mayor of Nuevo Cuscatlán from 2012 to 2015. During Nayib's 2015 campaign to be elected as mayor of San Salvador, Bukele served as Nayib's campaign manager and coached him for his public speeches.

As he did in 2015, Bukele was Nayib's campaign manager during the 2019 presidential election. Nayib ran his campaign with the Grand Alliance for National Unity (GANA). In December 2018, after Nayib accused the Supreme Electoral Court of fraud by refusing to change GANA's color from orange to blue on the electoral ballot (as it had recently changed its official color), Bukele stated that "it is not just the color, the people know how to vote for the swallow, but when are they [the TSE] going to stop" ("No es solo el color, si la gente sabe bien cómo votar por la golondrina, si no cuándo van a parar"). After Nayib refused to participate in the first presidential debate, Bukele stated that Nayib would not attend as there was no guarantee by the University of El Salvador, the organizers of the debate, that the debate would be impartial. Juan José Figueroa, a campaign advisor for Hugo Martínez of the Farabundo Martí National Liberation Front (FMLN), called Bukele and Nayib "liars and cowards" ("mentirosos y cobardes") for refusing to attend the debate. On election day, Nayib won 53 percent of the vote, an outright majority, in the first round.

Bukele was the campaign manager for the Nuevas Ideas political party during the 2021 legislative election, in which, the party won supermajorities in the Legislative Assembly, municipalities, and the Central American Parliament.

=== Presidential advisor ===
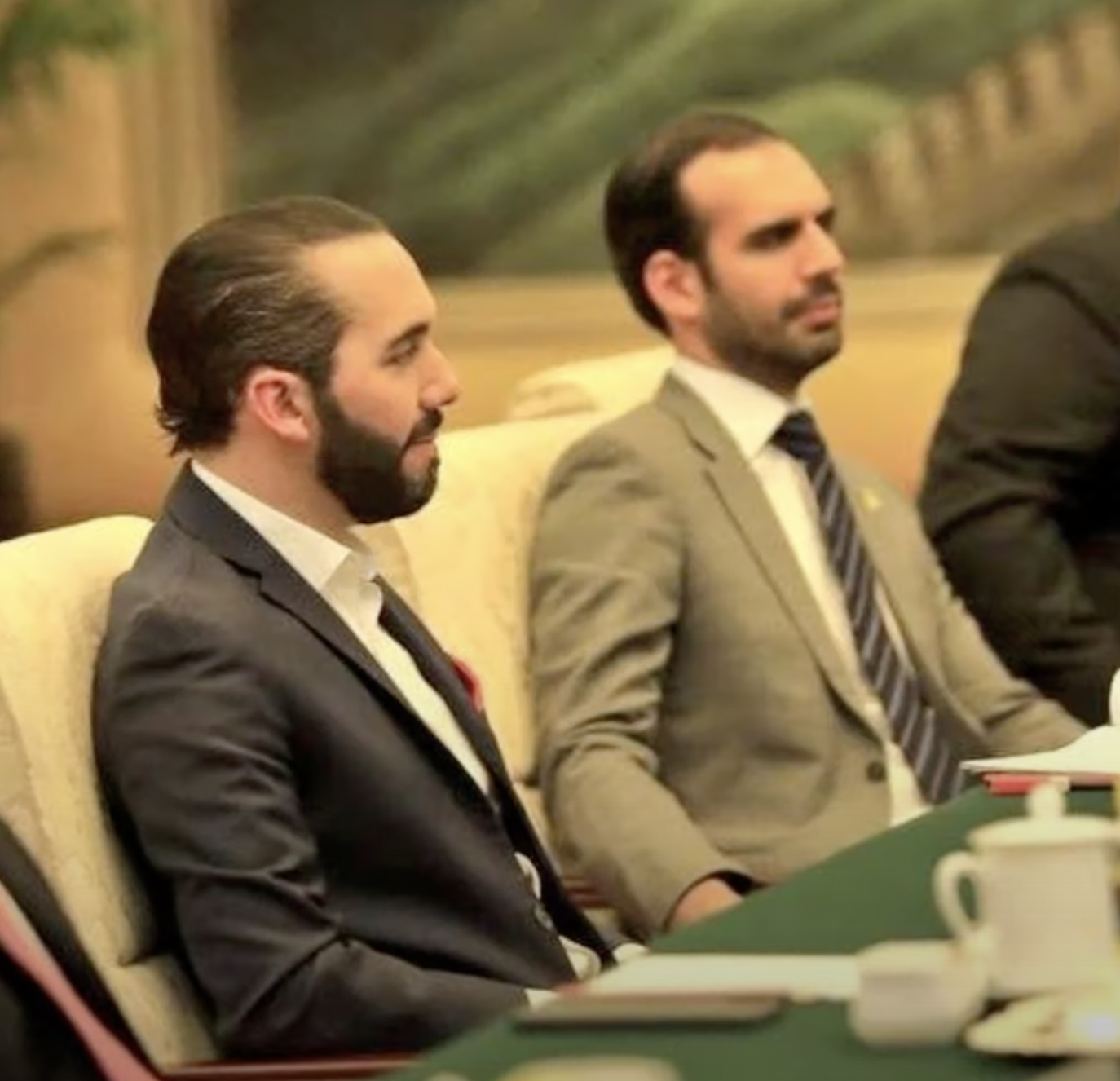
Nayib (left) and Karim (right) in May 2020

After Nayib assumed office on 1 June 2019, Bukele was not named as one of Nayib's 16 cabinet members, however, Bukele became one of Nayib's most important presidential advisors. The Salvadoran digital newspaper El Faro describes Bukele as a "political strategist and speechwriter" who "define[s] the direction of the presidency". In their 2023 book The Oligarchs' Grip: Fusing Wealth and Power, David Lingelbach and Valentina Rodríguez Guerra described Bukele as Nayib's "chief of staff". In April 2020, Fabio Castillo, a former secretary of the FMLN, stated that Bukele is "the only one who can have influence [over Nayib]" ("el único que puede tener influencia [sobre Nayib]"), that he is "more intelligent than the president" ("más inteligente que el presidente"), and that he has "an incredible influence over the affairs of the state that [he] should not have" ("una influencia increíble en los asuntos del estado que no [debería] tener").

Bukele accompanied Nayib on his presidential visit to China in December 2019. The Chinese government considered Bukele an important figure during the presidential visit, and Chinese ambassador to El Salvador Ou Jianhong personally thanked Bukele on Twitter for his "valuable work and important contributions".

On 6 December 2019, former Salvadoran President Mauricio Funes accused Bukele, deputy Guillermo Gallegos, Director of the National Civil Police Mauricio Arriaza Chicas, and Intelligence Director Peter Dumas of plotting an "illegal" ("ilegal") operation to capture him in Nicaragua and bring him back to El Salvador to face legal proceedings. Two days later, Funes accused five students of the Colonel Andrade Cabrera Military College of attempting to kidnap him; he later retracted his accusation, but continued to insist that he had uncovered Bukele's plot to capture him.

In May 2020, Bukele negotiated an agreement with legislators of the Nationalist Republican Alliance, the Grand Alliance for National Unity, the National Coalition Party, and the Christian Democratic Party regarding how to distribute US$1 billion of financial aid to companies affected by the COVID-19 pandemic. He also negotiated with those same parties to approve the Quarantine Law which allowed the Armed Forces of El Salvador and the National Civil Police to arrest individuals who had violated the country's nationwide COVID-19 lockdown.

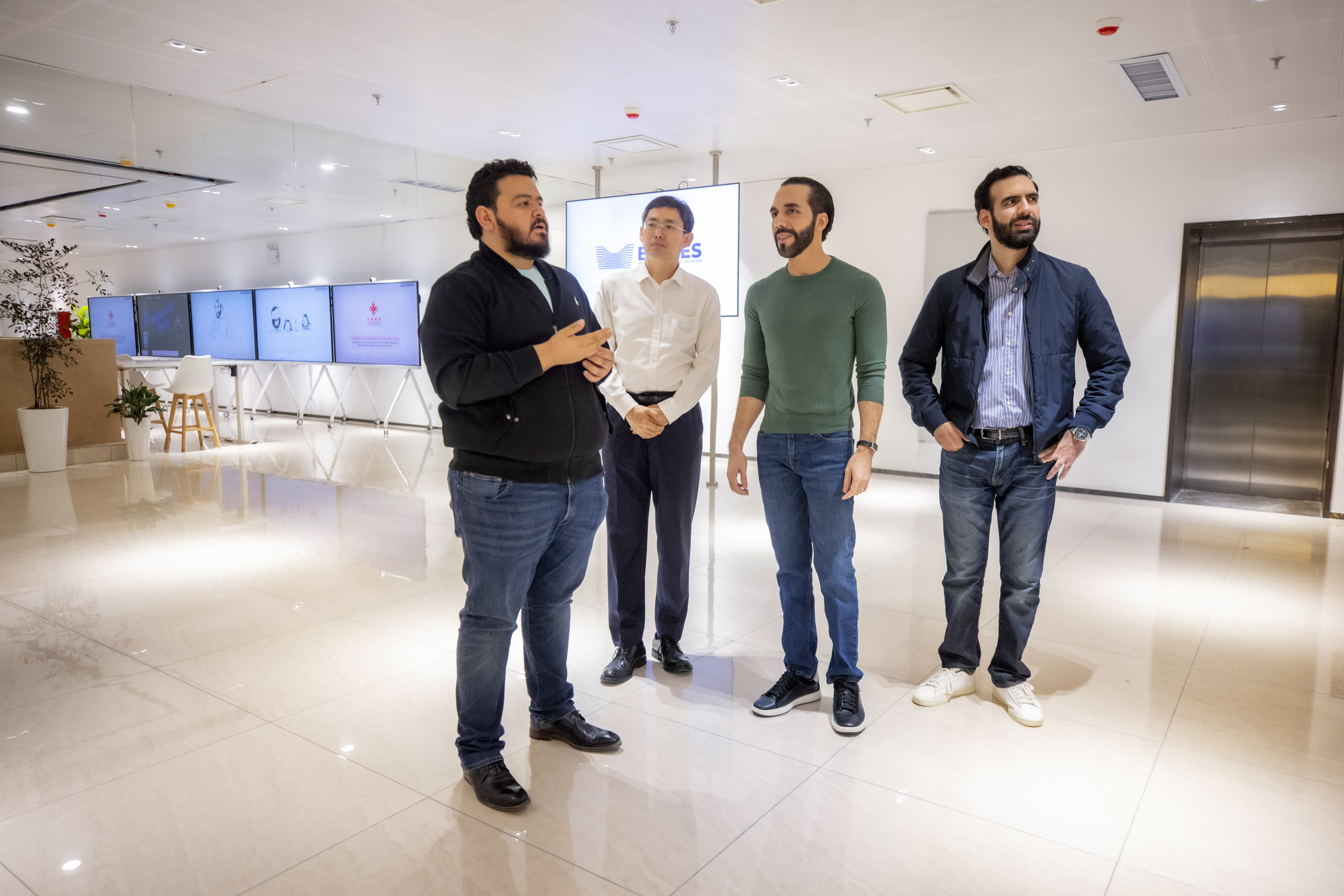
Karim (far-right) touring the National Library in November 2023

On 9 June 2021, the Legislative Assembly voted to pass a bill to make bitcoin legal tender in El Salvador. After the bill was passed, blockchain investor Nic Carter opened a virtual space for businessmen and bitcoin enthusiasts to discuss the law passed in El Salvador. Bukele joined the virtual space, and when asked about what the opposition in the Legislative Assembly was arguing regarding the bill, he responded by stating "Just bullshit, I don’t know". He also stated that "This is just the beginning. We do not know where it will take us. We are new to this" ("Esto es solo el inicio. No sabemos a dónde nos llevará esto. Somos nuevos en esto").

On 18 April 2023, Bukele announced that YouTubers and other content creators would be allowed to obtain press credentials to cover sessions of the Legislative Assembly. Bukele was the president of the organizing committee for the 2023 Central American and Caribbean Games which were held in San Salvador. On 14 November 2023, Bukele accompanied Nayib, Eric Doradeo, the vice minister of culture, and Zhang Yanhu, the Chinese ambassador to El Salvador, on a filmed tour of the newly-built National Library of El Salvador.

Bukele accompanied Nayib on 26 October 2023 when the latter initiated the process to register his 2024 re-election campaign. Bukele has denied rumors that he would be appointed as acting president in the event that Nayib resigns early to be able to run for re-election in the 2024. Furthermore, the constitution of El Salvador prohibits family members of the incumbent president from assuming the presidency. Regardless, Bukele remained a popular candidate to succeed Nayib as acting president until the Legislative Assembly officially designated Claudia Rodríguez de Guevara as the country's acting president on 30 November.

== Personal life ==
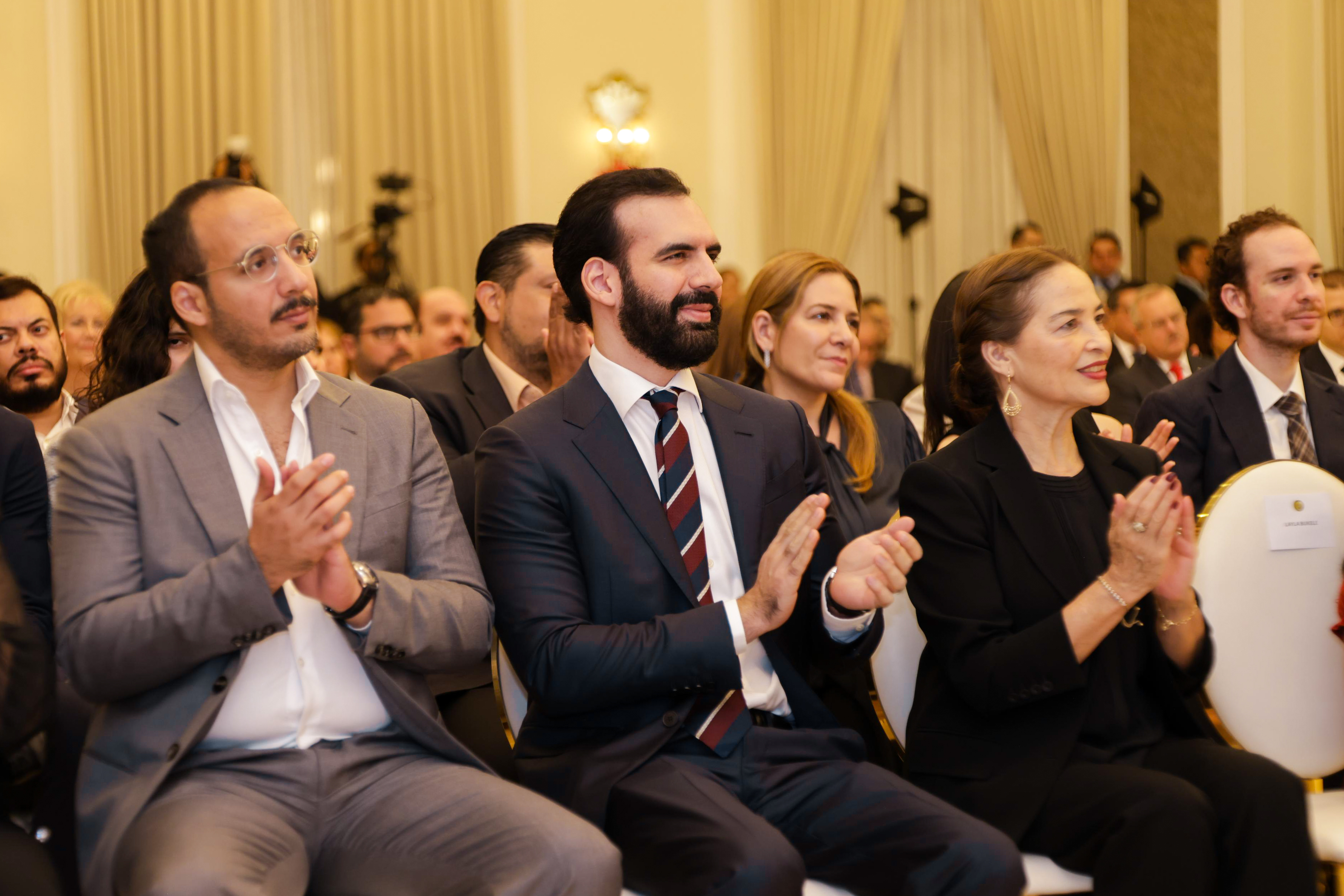
Bukele (center) with his brothers and mother in 2024

In 2021, Attorney General Raúl Melara launched an investigation into Bukele, Yusef, and Ibrajim regarding allegations of arbitrary acts, document falsification, and embezzlement. The investigation, known as Operation Cathedral which alleged that the three were the leaders of a "complex network of corruption", was suspended following Melara's removal by the Legislative Assembly and his subsequent replacement by Rodolfo Delgado.

On 28 August 2022, Twitter user Luis Rivas was arrested by the National Civil Police for reporting that Bukele was with his girlfriend at a Salvadoran beach while accompanied by a heavy security detail. Delgado justified the arrest by stating that "Freedom of expression is one thing and it is another to attack the integrity of people. Freedom of expression cannot be used to commit crimes" ("Una cosa es la libertad de expresión y otra es atentar contra la integridad de las personas. La libertad de expresión no puede ser usada para cometer delitos"). Rivas was released on 5 September 2022 but was shortly again re-arrested on undisclosed charges.

According to the Redacción magazine, Bukele purchased a historic building in Historic Downtown San Salvador for US$1.3 million three months after the Legislative Assembly passed a law exempting investors in that area from taxes in 2024.
