= Ernesto Castro =

Salvadoran politician and president of the Legislative Assembly (2021–present)

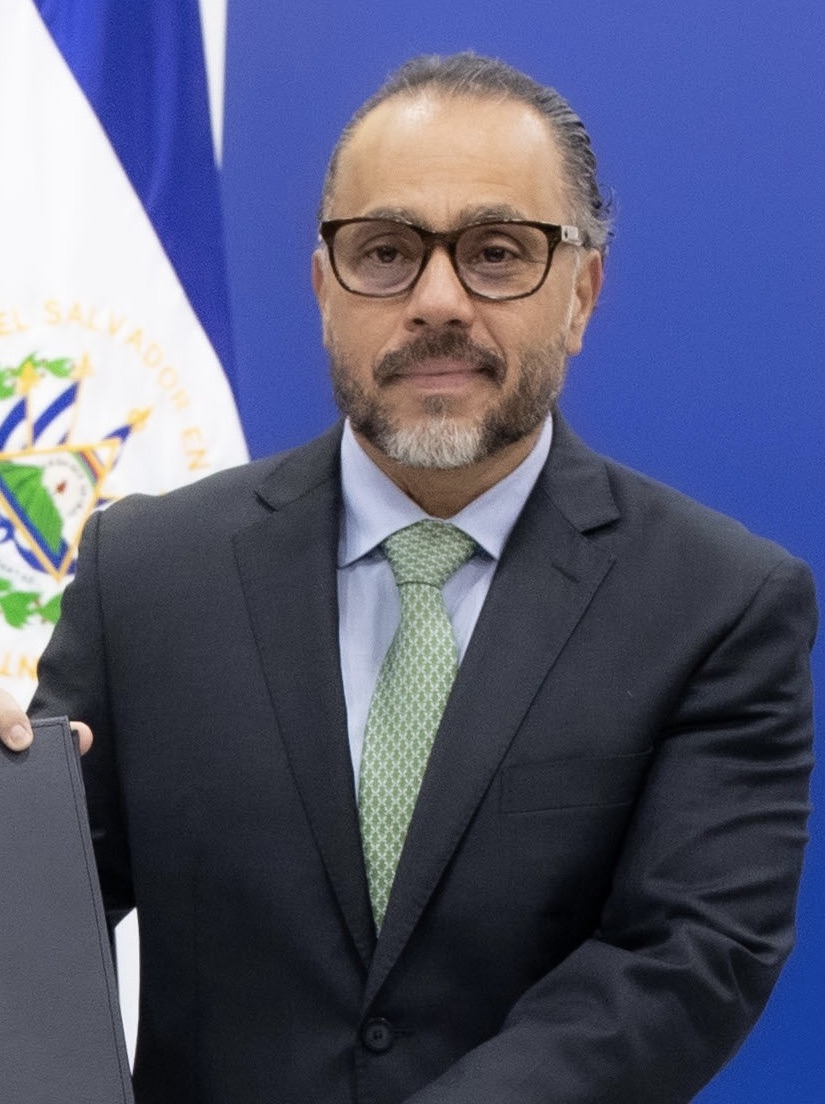
- Castro in 2023

69th President of the Legislative Assembly of El Salvador
- Incumbent
- Assumed office 1 May 2021
- Preceded by: Mario Ponce

Deputy of the Legislative Assembly of El Salvador from San Salvador
- Incumbent
- Assumed office 1 May 2021

President Pro-Tempore of FOPREL
- In office 11 March 2022 – 10 March 2023
- Preceded by: Sergio Gutiérrez
- Succeeded by: Alfredo Pacheco

Personal details
- Born: Ernesto Alfredo Castro Aldana; 26 May 1971 (age 55) El Salvador
- Party: Nuevas Ideas
- Spouse: Michelle Sol
- Occupation: Politician, businessman

Ernesto Alfredo Castro Aldana (born 26 May 1971) is a Salvadoran politician and businessman who currently serves as the 69th president of the Legislative Assembly of El Salvador. Castro previously served as a secretary and private advisor to Nayib Bukele from 2012 to 2020 when he was elected as a deputy of the Legislative Assembly from San Salvador in the 2021 legislative election.

== Early career ==
Ernesto Alfredo Castro Aldana was born on 26 May 1971. He has degrees in Business Administration and Marketing Studies. Castro is a businessman. Before entering politics, Castro worked as an external consultant to various companies and institutions, including serving as the general director of Grupo Tres y Punto. In 2006, Castro, Nayib Bukele, Karim Bukele, and Andrés García founded 503, S.A de C.V., a restaurant management company.

== Early political career ==
From 2012 to 2015, Castro was Bukele's secretary and private advisor while he served as mayor of Nuevo Cuscatlán from 2012 to 2015. From 2015 to 2018, Castro continued to serve as Bukele's secretary and private advisor while he was serving as mayor of San Salvador. Castro was a founding member of Nuevas Ideas, a political party established by Bukele in 2017. Castro continued to serve as Bukele's private secretary after Bukele assumed the presidency on 1 June 2019. During the COVID-19 pandemic, Castro supported the nationwide lockdowns implemented by Bukele's government. Castro resigned as Bukele's secretary and private advisor in 2020 to seek public office in the 2021 legislative election.

On 20 July 2020, Castro was elected as a candidate for deputy of the Legislative Assembly as a member of Nuevas Ideas. As a candidate, Castro stated that "we will attack the issue of corruption, we will consolidate the issue of transparency, we will address the issue of accountability, we will avoid and break all those oligarchic monopolies" ("vamos atacar el tema de la corrupción, vamos a consolidar el tema de la transparencia, vamos a hacer el tema de la rendición de cuentas, vamos a evitar y vamos a quebrar todos esos monopolios oligárquicos"). On 28 February 2021, Castro received 57,733 marks—the most of any candidate—and was elected as a deputy to the Legislative Assembly; he was one of 56 Nuevas Ideas deputies to be elected.

== President of the Legislative Assembly ==
Prior to assuming office as a deputy, an opinion poll conducted by La Prensa Gráfica from 20 to 26 April 2021 found that 6.6 percent of respondents believed that Castro would be the best option to serve as president of the Legislative Assembly, the highest percent received by any individual. Castro assumed office on 1 May 2021, and 64 out of the 84 deputies of the Legislative Assembly voted to elect Castro as the president of the Legislative Assembly. (Note: The 64 votes in favor of Castro's election came from Nuevas Ideas, the Grand Alliance for National Unity, the National Coalition Party, and the Christian Democratic Party. The 20 abstentions came from the Nationalist Republican Alliance, the Farabundo Martí National Liberation Front, Vamos, and Nuestro Tiempo.) That same day, Castro voted with the Nuevas Ideas-led Legislative Assembly to remove Attorney General Raúl Melara and five Supreme Court justices from the constitutional court.

On 11 March 2022, Castro was named as the president pro-tempore of the Forum of Presidents of Legislative Branches of Central America, the Caribbean Basin, and Mexico (FOPREL) for the 2022–2023 term, succeeding Sergio Gutiérrez of Mexico. Castro left office on 10 March 2023 and was succeeded by his vice president pro-tempore, Alfredo Pacheco of the Dominican Republic.

In December 2022, Bukele suggested reducing the total number of municipalities in El Salvador from 262 to 50. In February 2023, Castro confirmed that Nuevas Ideas was not only evaluating a proposal to reduce the number of municipalities from 262 to 50, but that the party was also evaluating a proposal to reduce the number of seats on the Legislative Assembly from 84 to 64. Ultimately, in June 2023, Castro voted with the Nuevas Ideas-led Legislative Assembly to reduce the number of municipalities from 262 to 44 and the number of seats on the Legislative Assembly from 84 to 60. Opposition politicians claimed that the reductions were attempts by Nuevas Ideas to consolidate power and diminish the political representation of smaller political parties.

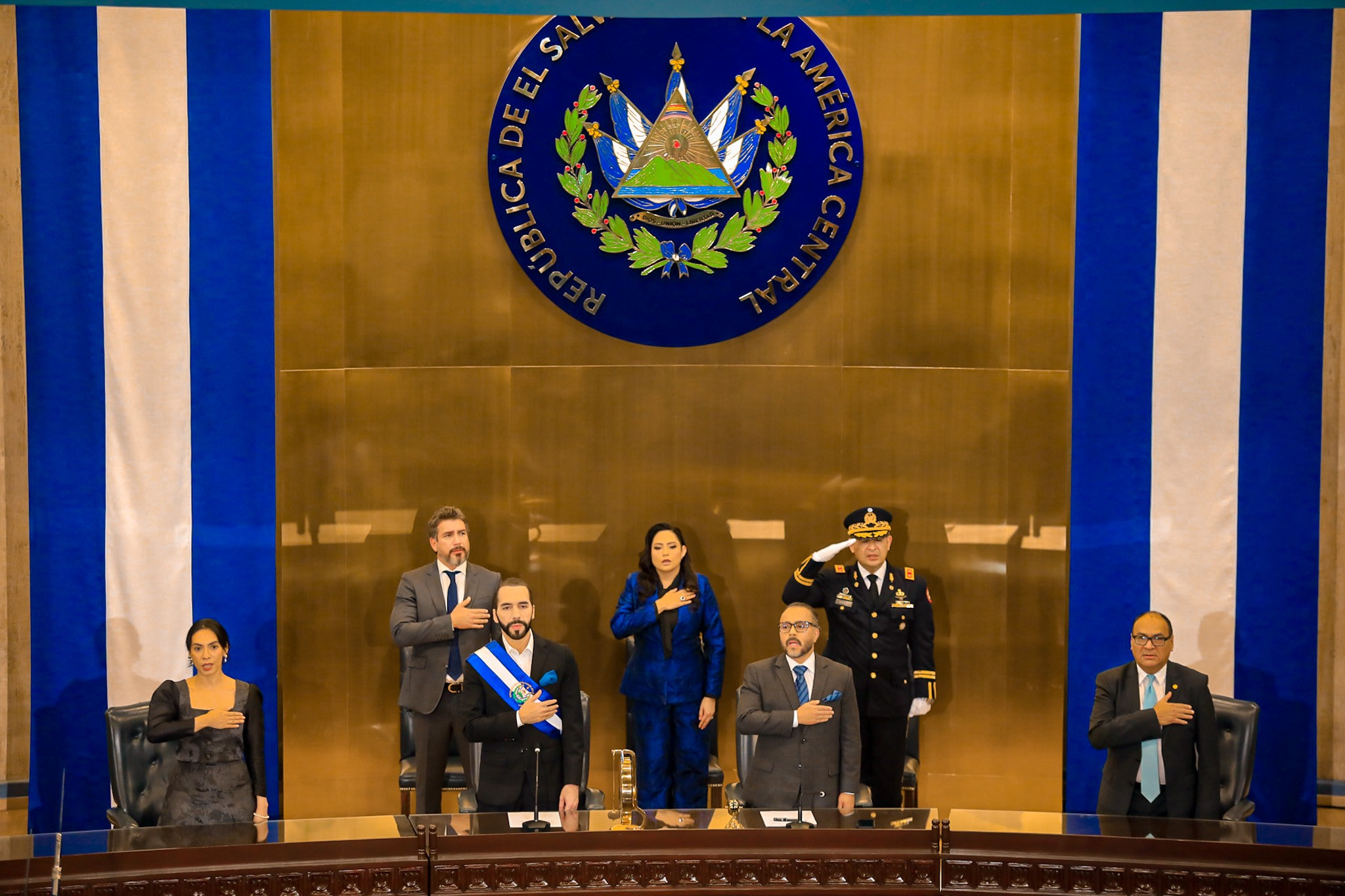
Castro with Nayib Bukele in 2023

On 20 February 2023, Castro announced that he was running for re-election to the Legislative Assembly in the 2024 legislative election. He also stated that most deputies from Nuevas Ideas would also be seeking re-election. On 9 July 2023, Castro secured one of Nuevas Ideas' 16 nominations for the legislative seats of San Salvador. In December 2022, Castro stated that Nuevas Ideas aimed to win 70 seats in the Legislative Assembly, but after the reduction of legislative seats and municipalities, Castro stated that the party now aimed to win all 60 seats in the Legislative Assembly and all 44 municipalities. Castro's projections were criticized by opposition politicians who described them as being "undemocratic" ("antidemocrática") and an attempt to "concentrate power" ("concentrar el poder"). In the lead up to the election, Castro attended four reunions with Salvadoran expatriates living in the United States; the four reunions Castro attended were held in Houston, Los Angeles, New York City, and Washington, D.C. Castro won re-election during the 2024 legislative election.

On 1 May 2024, Castro was re-elected as the president of the Legislative Assembly. Castro is running for re-election in 2027.

== Political positions ==
Castro opposes the legalization of abortion in El Salvador. In March 2023, Castro wrote on Twitter that "there is not even the slightest possibility" ("no existe ni la más mínima posibilidad") that the Nuevas Ideas-led Legislative Assembly would vote in favor of legalizing abortion.

== Personal life ==
Castro is married to Michelle Sol. Sol succeeded Bukele as mayor of Nuevo Cuscatlán, serving from 2015 to 2018; is the incumbent minister of housing, serving since 2019; and is seeking election as mayor of La Libertad Este in the 2024 general election. Sol is a niece of Ana Ligia Mixco Sol de Saca, the former first lady of El Salvador from 2004 to 2009.

As of November 2022, Castro has a net worth of around US$881,000 and receives a monthly salary of US$5,700. In February 2023, the El Faro digital newspaper revealed that Castro and Sol's cooking company, Sociedad Castro Sol S.A. de C.V., had received US$504,000 in 18 checks from Salvadoran President Mauricio Funes between September 2010 and August 2011 to provide food and cook for the Presidential Battalion. El Faro alleged that the payments came from a black budget managed by Funes during his presidency.

In September 2024, Infobae published audio recordings made by Alejandro Muyshondt, the national security advisor of El Salvador from 2019 to 2023, which supposedly depicted an agreement between him and Castro to engage in espionage against four Salvadoran newspapers: El Diario de Hoy, El Faro, La Prensa Gráfica, and Revista Factum. In an interview, Castro suggested that the audio was created by artificial intelligence.

== Notes ==
Political offices
Preceded by Mario Ponce	President of the Legislative Assembly; 2021–present	Incumbent
Preceded by Sergio Gutiérrez	President Pro-Tempore of FOPREL; 2022–2023	Succeeded by Alfredo Pacheco
