= Attorney General of El Salvador =

Salvadoran legal office

The Attorney General of El Salvador, officially the Attorney General of the Republic (Spanish: Fiscalía General de la República; abbreviated FGR), is a permanent and independent office under the Public Ministry which possesses legal and administrative autonomy.

The Attorney General's mission is "to promote and assist with gender equity the defense of the family, the people and interests of minors, the disabled and the elderly, grant legal assistance, preventive psychosocial care and mediation and conciliation services, judicially and extrajudicially represent people, especially those with few economic resources in defense of individual freedom, labor rights, family and real and personal rights." The Attorney General is elected by the Legislative Assembly of the Republic of El Salvador for a period of three years (with the possibility of being re-elected).

== List of attorneys general ==
| Attorney General | | Assumed office | Left office | Ref. |
|---|---|---|---|---|
| 1 | Patrocinio Guzmán Trigueros | February 1940 | July 1940 | |
| 2 | José Lázaro Arévalo Vasconcelos | October 1940 | 9 May 1944 | |
| 3 | Francisco Guillermo Pérez | May 1944 | 21 October 1944 | |
| 4 | Manuel Humberto Rivera | October 1944 | May 1945 | |
| 5 | Alberto Gómez Zárate | May 1945 | 14 December 1948 | |
| 6 | Julio Eduardo Jiménez Castillo | December 1948 | October 1950 | |
| 7 | Francisco Guillermo Pérez | October 1950 | January 1951 | |
| 8 | Juan Gregorio Guardado | January 1951 | August 1951 | |
| 9 | Salvador Araujo (interim) | August 1951 | September 1951 | |
| 10 | Francisco Guillermo Pérez (ad honorem) | September 1951 | May 1952 | |
| 11 | Rogelio Bustamante | April 1952 | January 1954 | |
| 12 | Salvador Alemán Echeverría (interim) | February 1954 | May 1954 | |
| 13 | Rogelio Bustamante | June 1954 | 26 October 1960 | |
| 14 | Doctor Pedro Benjamín Mancía | October 1960 | February 1961 | |
| 15 | Carlos Alberto Zaldívar | February 1961 | January 1962 | |
| 16 | Julio Rank Altamirano | 25 January 1962 | July 1963 | |
| 17 | Pedro Benjamín Mancía | July 1963 | January 1966 | |
| 18 | Juan Doño Altamirano | January 1966 | December 1966 | |
| 19 | Óscar Augusto Cañas Molina | 1966 | 1 June 1967 | |
| 20 | Yolanda Myers de Vásquez | 1 June 1967 | 1 June 1972 | |
| 21 | Óscar Rodríguez Díaz | 1 June 1972 | 1 June 1977 | |
| 22 | Guillermo Rodolfo Walsh | 1 June 1977 | 15 October 1979 | |
| 23 | Alfredo del Tránsito Monge | 1979 | 1979 | |
| 24 | Doctor Mario Zamora Rivas | 1980 | 3 March 1980 | |
| 25 | Manuel Francisco Cardona Herrera | 1980 | 1981 | |
| 26 | Carlos Mauricio Molina Fonseca | January 1981 | 2 May 1982 | |
| 27 | Dina Castro de Callejas | 1982 | 1984 | |
| 28 | Rafael Flores y Flores | 1984 | 1987 | |
| 29 | Francisco Cardona Herrera | 1987 | 1989 | |
| 30 | Rhina Escalante de Rey Prendes | 1989 | 1990 | |
| 31 | José Vicente Machado Salgado | 1990 | 1993 | |
| 32 | Lázaro Tadeo Bernal | 1993 | 1993 | |
| 33 | Simón Isidro Rivera Argueta | 1993 | 1996 | |
| 34 | Miguel Ángel Cardoza Ayala | 1996 | 2003 | |
| 35 | Belisario Amadeo Artiga Artiga | 2003 | 2006 | |
| 36 | Félix Garrid Safie Parada | 2006 | 19 April 2009 | |
| 37 | Ástor Escalante Saravia | 20 April 2009 | September 2009 | |
| 38 | Romeo Benjamín Barahona Meléndez | September 2009 | 2012 | |
| 39 | Luis Antonio Martínez González | 2012 | 2015 | |
| 40 | Douglas Arquímedes Meléndez Ruiz | 6 January 2016 | 6 January 2019 | |
| 41 | Raúl Ernesto Melara Morán | 6 January 2019 | 1 May 2021 | |
| 42 | Rodolfo Antonio Delgado Montes | 2 May 2021 | Incumbent | |

== See also ==
- Justice ministry
- Politics of El Salvador
