= Xavier Zablah Bukele =

Salvadoran politician

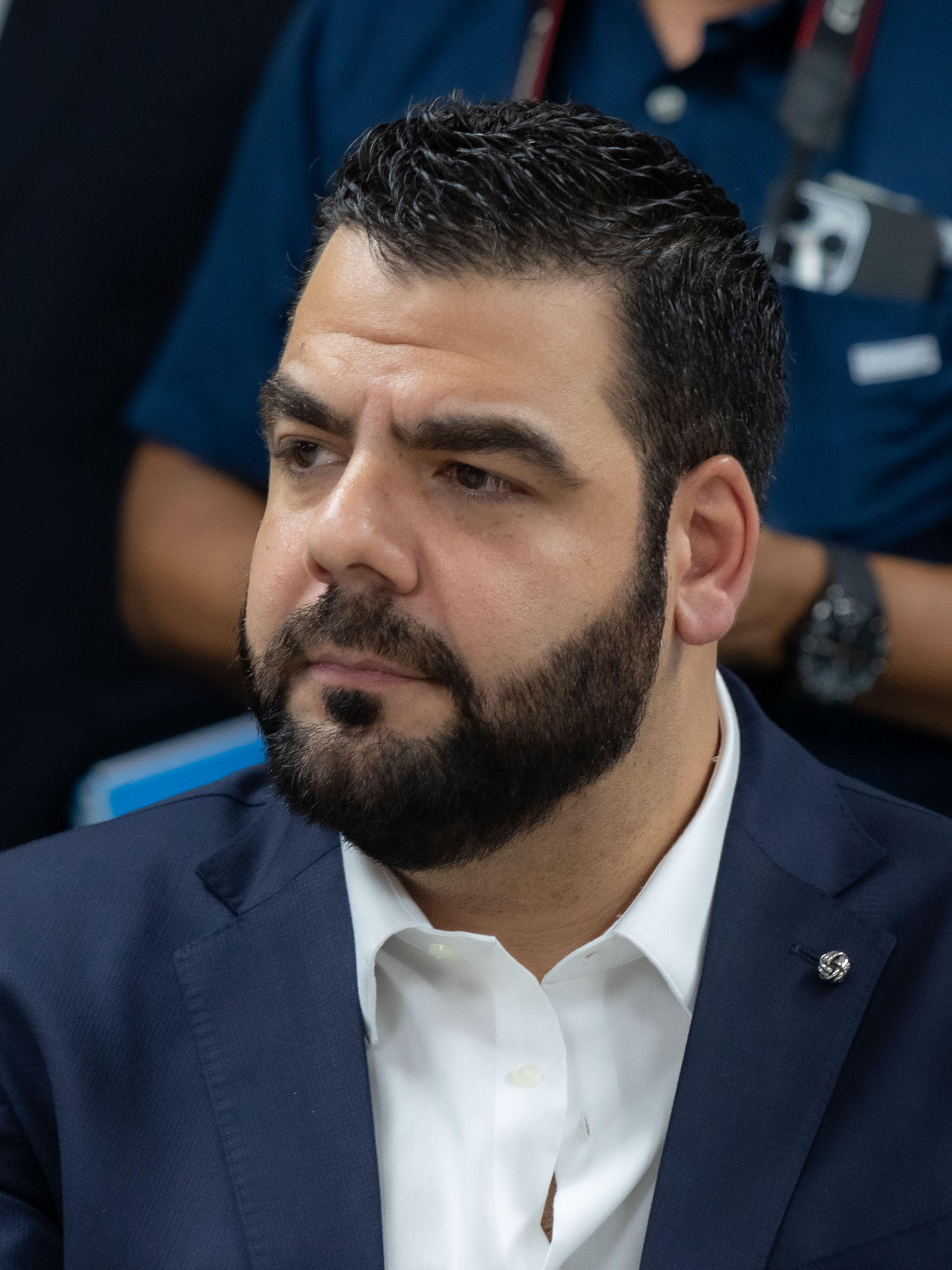
- Zablah in 2023

2nd President of Nuevas Ideas
- Incumbent
- Assumed office 2 March 2020
- Preceded by: Federico Anliker

Personal details
- Born: Xavier Eduardo Zablah Bukele El Salvador
- Party: Nuevas Ideas
- Spouse: Sofía Medina
- Relatives: Nayib Bukele (cousin)
- Education: Escuela Panamericana

Xavier Eduardo Zablah Bukele is a Salvadoran politician and businessman who has served as the president of the Nuevas Ideas political party since 2020. He is a cousin of Nayib Bukele, the incumbent president of El Salvador.

== Early life ==
Xavier Eduardo Zablah Bukele's mother is Mary Nelly Bukele Kattán, a sister of Armando Bukele Kattán. Through his uncle, Zablah is a cousin of Nayib Bukele, the incumbent president of El Salvador. He has two siblings, Nelly and Francisco.

Zablah attended the Escuela Panamericana. He owns shares in four companies: Astra Motors, Check Out, Ahead, and Altermedia.

== Political career ==
In 2020, the Nuevas Ideas political party held internal elections to select its leadership, including the position of president—the leader of the party. Yusef Bukele, one of Nayib Bukele's brothers, was the favorite to succeed then-leader Federico Anliker, however, he later declined to contest the position. Subsequently, Zablah became the favorite to succeed Anliker as the party's leader; his opponents were Isabel Monje and Israel Juárez. On 1 March 2020, Zablah was elected as the leader of Nuevas Ideas, winning 31,476 votes compared to Monje's 3,806 votes and Juárez's 868 votes.

On 26 October 2023, Zablah accompanied Nayib Bukele when he initiated the process to register his re-election campaign for the 2024 presidential election.

== Personal life ==
Zablah is married to Sofía Medina.

== Electoral history ==
Year	Office	Type	Party	Main opponent	Party	Votes for Zablah				Result	Swing
Year	Office	Type	Party	Main opponent	Party	Total	%	P.	±%	Result	Swing
2020	President of Nuevas Ideas	Internal	NI	Isabel Monje	NI	31,476	87.07	1st	N/A	Won	N/A

Party political offices
Preceded by Federico Anliker	President of Nuevas Ideas; 2020–present	Incumbent
