= National Library of El Salvador =

National library in San Salvador, El Salvador

- Biblioteca Nacional de El Salvador
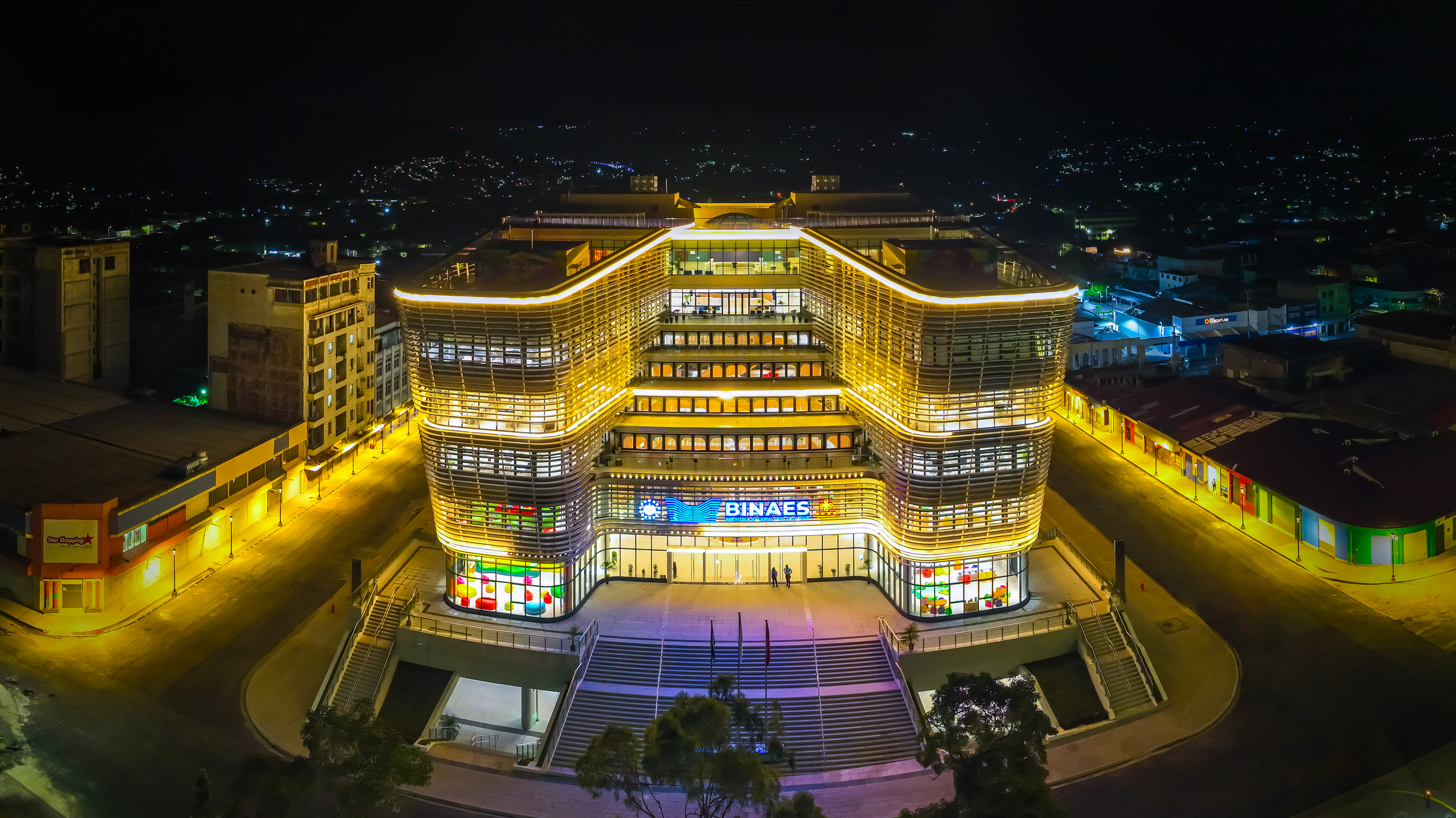
- 13°41′48.5″N 89°11′28.7″W
- Location: Plaza Gerardo Barrios, San Salvador, El Salvador
- Type: National library
- Established: 14 November 2023

The National Library of El Salvador (Spanish: Biblioteca Nacional de El Salvador, abbreviated BINAES) is a national library located in San Salvador, the capital city of El Salvador. The library was opened in November 2023 and stands on the former site of the Francisco Gavidia National Library. It was built with the cooperation of the People’s Republic of China.

== History ==
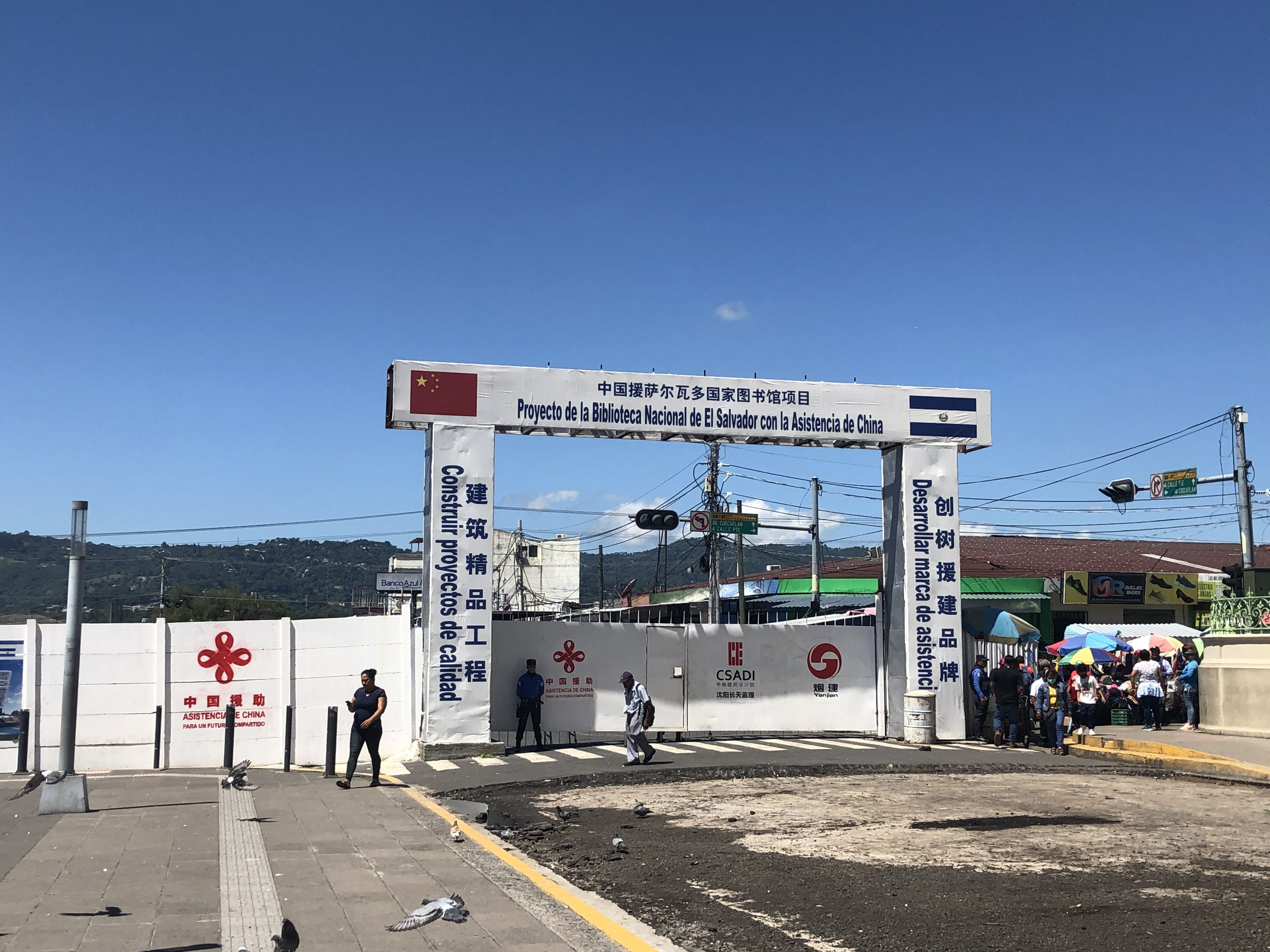
The library under construction

In December 2019, Salvadoran President Nayib Bukele announced the construction of a new national library, known as simply the National Library of El Salvador, in San Salvador following an international trip to China where Bukele met with Xi Jinping, the leader of China. The library's construction was projected to cost at least US$54 million and would be built with Chinese cooperation. On 4 October 2021, the Salvadoran government began demolition of the Francisco Gavidia National Library, which the new national library would replace. The Francisco Gavidia National Library was originally built in 1870 during the presidency of Francisco Dueñas.

Construction on the National Library of El Salvador began on 3 February 2022. On February 20, 2024, the Chancellor of El Salvador under the direction of Cultural Promotion, Sport, and Cuisine, received 83 books as a donation from the Moroccan Embassy accredited in El Salvador. The books spanned genres such as tourism, world cultures, and children’s literature in French, English and Spanish. They were delivered to the director of the Cultural Promotion, Sport and Cuisine under the Vice Ministry of Diaspora and Human Mobility, Jessica Aguilar. According to the Vice Ministry, allied countries made the first delivery of approximately 4,900 books to accompany this donation.

The library was opened on 14 November 2023 and Bukele posted a filmed tour of the library on his Twitter account; on the tour, he was accompanied by his brother and presidential advisor, Karim Bukele, and the vice minister of culture, Eric Doradeo. The tour displayed the library's facilities.

== Library Services ==
The National Library of El Salvador (BINAES) is open 24/7, being the first national library in the world to offer such hours. With seven floors in the building, library services include:

- First Floor: game area, technology space, story-time area, 6,000 book collection written in Spanish, Náhuatl and English, café, gift shop, and auditorium
- Second Floor: rest area, lactation rooms, Tree of Life collection, infirmary, and psychomotor learning area
- Third Floor: library collection spanning 26,000 books, computers, El Principito area, LEGO Zone, Gaming Zone, Special Education classroom, and sensory space
- Fourth Floor: themed Game of Thrones, Star Wars and Lord of the Rings spaces, more library collections, Internet Lab, and Gaming Zone
- Fifth Floor: historic site documentation on behalf of the National General Archives, general collections, Latin American literature, world literature, several seating areas and contemplative spaces
- Sixth Floor: study rooms, flight simulators, VR room, Gaming Zone, makerspace, and robotics area
- Seventh Floor: restaurant, art gallery, terraces, and auditorium

On the opening date, the former Francisco Gavidia National Library's original collections remain inaccessible to the public. The BINAES also has trilingual signage in Spanish, Náhuatl and English.
