= Raúl Melara =

Attorney General of El Salvador (2019–2021)

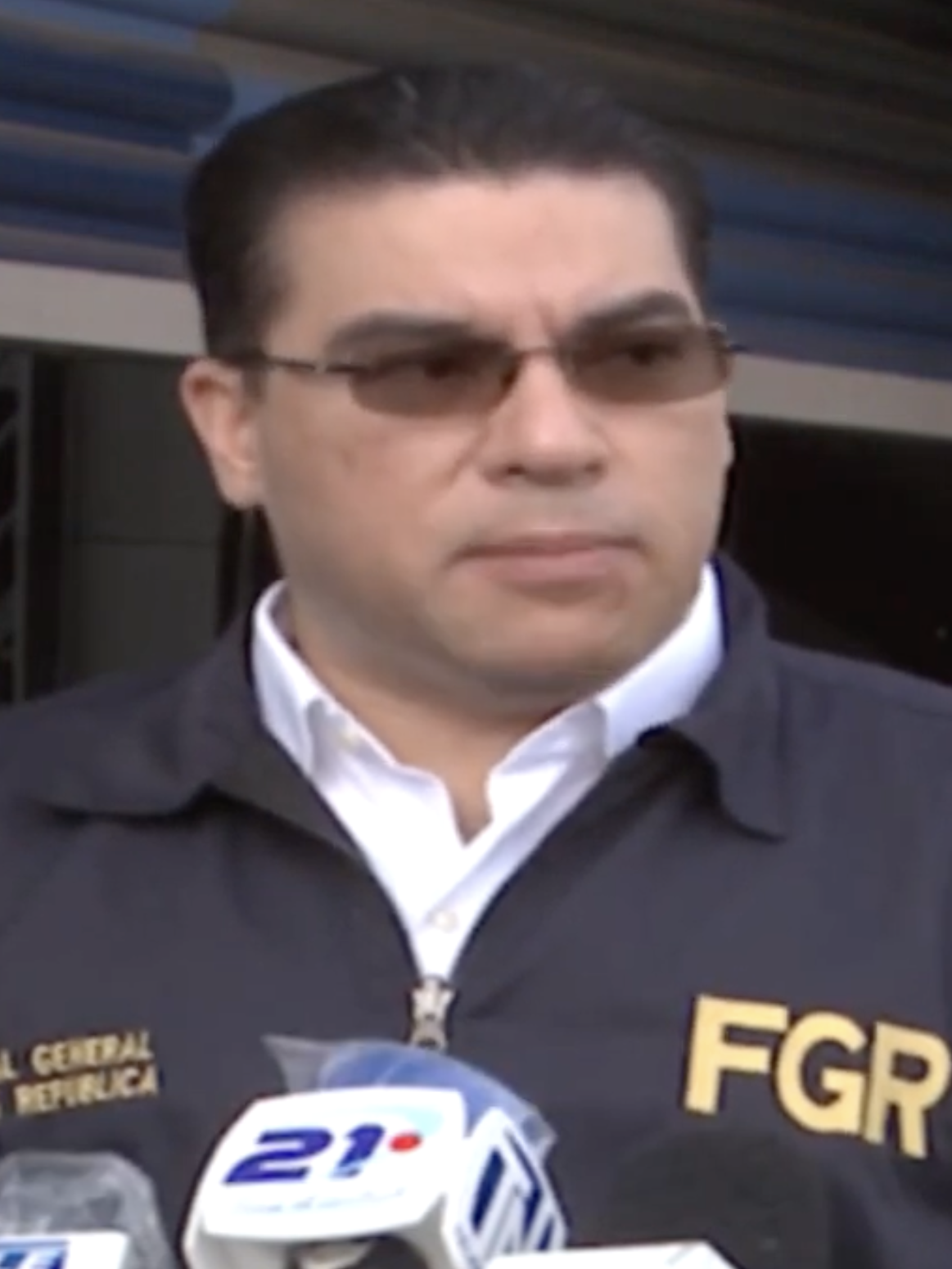
- Melara in 2020

41st Attorney General of El Salvador
- In office 6 January 2019 – 1 May 2021
- President: Salvador Sánchez Cerén (2019); Nayib Bukele (2019–2021)
- Preceded by: Douglas Meléndez
- Succeeded by: Rodolfo Delgado

Personal details
- Born: Raúl Ernesto Melara Morán; 1973 (age 52–53) San Salvador, El Salvador
- Education: José Matías Delgado University; Comillas Pontifical University; Autonomous University of Barcelona
- Occupation: Lawyer, notary
- Website: www.melaralaw.com

Raúl Ernesto Melara Morán (born 1973) is a Salvadoran lawyer and notary who served as the Attorney General of El Salvador from 2019 to 2021 when he was removed from office by the Legislative Assembly of El Salvador.

== Early life ==
Raúl Ernesto Melara Morán was born in 1973 in San Salvador, El Salvador. He attended the José Matías Delgado University in Antiguo Cuscatlán from 1991 to 1995 and graduated with a degree in judicial sciences. While studying, he was a court adjudicator of San Salvador's Third Civil Court until 1994, after which, he was the court's clerk until 1997. Melara attended Comillas Pontifical University in Madrid, Spain from 2001 to 2002 and the Autonomous University of Barcelona in Barcelona, Spain from 2006 to 2010 where he completed his doctorate.

After Melara's graduation, he became a practicing lawyer. From 2002 to 2003, Melara was a regulatory advisor for the General Superintendency of Electricity and Telecommunications and was a member of its board of directors from 2003 to 2008. In 2004, he was a competition law consultant for the Ministry of the Economy. Melara was the executive director of the National Association of Private Enterprise from 2004 to 2010. At some point, he became an alternate magistrate of the Supreme Court of Justice of El Salvador. Melara was an advisor to Carlos Calleja, the Nationalist Republican Alliance's (ARENA) presidential candidate during the 2019 presidential election.

== Attorney General of El Salvador ==
On 21 December 2018, the Legislative Assembly of El Salvador voted 83–0 to select Melara as the Attorney General of El Salvador for the 2019–2022 term. He assumed office on 6 January 2019, succeeding Douglas Meléndez. Melara briefly served under Farabundo Martí National Liberation Front (FMLN) resident Salvador Sánchez Cerén until 1 June 2019 when Cerén was succeeded by the Grand Alliance for National Unity's (GANA) Nayib Bukele.

In January 2020, Melara asked for the Legislative Assembly to revoke Deputy Norman Quijano's parliamentary immunity, accusing him of negotiating with gangs during his 2014 presidential campaign, but the Legislative Assembly failed to approve this motion. In February 2020, Melara asserted that there was evidence of present and former government officials who engaged in negotiations with criminal gangs dating back to 2003 and rejected allegations that such claims were "political show" ("show político"). Melara eventually issued an arrest warrant for Quijano on 1 May 2021 when he left office at the beginning of a new legislative session. In July 2020, Melara issued an arrest warrant for former president Mauricio Funes, accusing him of being involved gang negotiations during the 2012–2014 Salvadoran gang truce.

In September 2020, Melara launched an investigation into Bukele's government, suspecting that it negotiated with criminal gangs to reduce the country's murder rate. In November 2020, Melara launched an separate investigation into Bukele's government's conduct during the COVID-19 pandemic and launched 20 raids of government offices searching for evidence of unauthorized purchases with pandemic funds. Sometime in 2021, Melara opened an investigation known as Operation Citadel that investigated Bukele's brothers—Karim, Yusef, and Ibrajim—for arbitrary acts, forgery, and embezzlement. On 26 April 2021, Melara stated that he was investigating several corruption cases from former governments.

On 1 May 2021, during the first session of the newly elected 13th Legislative Assembly, the legislature, controlled by a supermajority led by Bukele's Nuevas Ideas, voted with 64 votes to remove Melara as attorney general before the end of his term on 5 January 2022. Melara was removed alongside the five magistrates of the Constitutional Court of the Supreme Court of Justice of El Salvador. The Legislative Assembly replaced Melara with Rodolfo Delgado. United States Secretary of State Antony Blinken criticized Melara's removal, stating that Melara was "fighting corruption and impunity and is an effective partner of efforts to combat crime in both the United States and El Salvador".

== Post-attorney general career ==
After Melara's removal, his investigation into the government's COVID-19 pandemic spending was suspended by the Legislative Assembly on 7 May 2021. His investigations into Bukele's brothers and into alleged negotiations between Bukele's government and gangs were similarly suspended by December 2021.

In November 2021, lawyer Arnáu Baulenas filed a complaint against Melara accusing him of neglect in a case where Baulenas' client was ordered to pay US$2 million to the Salvadoran government in damages. In February 2022, lawyer Luis Orantes sued Melara and his father, Romeo, accusing both of aggravated forgery and perjury for supposedly presenting the deed for a property in Ciudad Delgado whose owner had been dead for months.

Legal offices
Preceded by Douglas Meléndez	Attorney General of El Salvador; 2019–2021	Succeeded by Rodolfo Delgado
