= Armando Bukele Kattán =

Father of 81st President of El Salvador

- Born: 16 December 1944; San Salvador, El Salvador
- Died: 30 November 2015 (aged 70); San Salvador, El Salvador
- Education: University of El Salvador
- Occupations: Chemist, entrepreneur, Islamic religious leader
- Children: 10, including Nayib, Karim, Yusef, Ibrajim, and Yamil

Armando Bukele Kattán (16 December 1944 – 30 November 2015) was a Palestinian Salvadoran chemist, entrepreneur, Islamic religious leader, and father of current Salvadoran president Nayib Bukele.

== Early years ==
Armando Bukele Kattán was born in San Salvador, on 16 December 1944, the son of Humberto Bukele Salman and Victoria Kattán de Bukele. His parents were Palestinian Christians from Bethlehem, Mutasarrifate of Jerusalem, Ottoman Empire who had emigrated to El Salvador at the beginning of the 20th century as part of an emigration wave. He completed his high school studies at the Liceo Salvadoreño.

== Education ==
In 1967, Bukele graduated as a doctor of industrial chemistry from the University of El Salvador.

== Entrepreneur ==
Bukele Kattan founded companies dedicated to the textile industry, commerce, pharmaceuticals, advertising and the media. He was also involved with the philanthropic efforts of the Kiwanis Club, a community service institution that brings together entrepreneurs and professionals.

== Religious leader and influence ==
Bukele converted from Christianity to Islam in the 1980s and founded five mosques during his lifetime, including the first mosque in El Salvador in 1992. He served as Imam of the Salvadoran Islamic Community and was part of the Islamic Organization for Latin America and the Caribbean.

He had a significant influence on his son, Nayib Bukele, who has often highlighted his father's role as a mentor and his commitment to social justice.

== Death ==
Bukele died on 30 November 2015. On the fifth anniversary of his death, President Nayib Bukele honored his memory, stating how much his guidance was missed.

== Published works ==
- The ABCs of Islam
- Clarifying Concepts in Physics

In 2017, the book The precise relativity of the point was published posthumously. It is an extensive compilation of Bukele's thoughts gathered on his Twitter account and his program Clarifying Concepts.
