= Bitcoin in El Salvador =

Usage of a cryptocurrency in El Salvador

Legal status of bitcoin Permissive (legal to use bitcoin, with minimal or no restrictions) Restricted (some legal restrictions on the usage of bitcoin) Contentious (interpretation of old laws, but bitcoin is not directly prohibited) Prohibited (full or partial prohibition on the use of bitcoin) No data (no information available)

El Salvador was the first country in the world to use bitcoin as legal tender, after it was adopted as such by the Legislative Assembly of El Salvador in 2021. It has been promoted by Nayib Bukele, the president of El Salvador, who claimed that it would improve the economy by making banking easier for Salvadorans, and that it would encourage foreign investment. In 2022, more Salvadorians had Bitcoin Lightning wallets than bank accounts.

The adoption was criticized both internationally and within El Salvador, due to the volatility of bitcoin, its environmental impact, and lack of transparency regarding the government's fiscal policy. By 2024, El Salvador had agreed to partially limit its involvement with bitcoin as part of a deal made with the International Monetary Fund (IMF).

In February 2025, bitcoin was rescinded as legal tender in El Salvador. Research showed it was rarely used by the public. In March 2025, The Economist wrote that El Salvador's bitcoin experiment had been a failure, bringing more costs than benefits to the El Salvador economy.

== History ==
=== Background ===
The colón (SVC) was the official currency of El Salvador from 1892 until it was replaced by the US dollar on January 1, 2001, when the Legislative Assembly of El Salvador passed the Monetary Integration Act under the administration of former President Francisco Flores. The Act authorized the free circulation of the United States dollar in El Salvador, and removed the colón from circulation. The purpose of dollarizing El Salvador was to achieve financial stability by encouraging foreign investment and decreasing transaction costs of international trade.

However, the government was unable to control monetary policy after dollarization, as the value of currency was tied to the United States Federal Reserve. The exchange rate, which was fixed at one U.S. dollar being equivalent to 8.75 colóns, decreased the purchasing power of the population. Dollarization slowed down El Salvador's exports because it could not compete against the undervalued currencies of other developing countries such as China. The lack of financial literacy harmed the population of El Salvador since they did not know how to use the US dollar, nor did they understand its value.

Remittances accounted for 23% of GDP in 2020. They are currently delivered by money transmitters, which operate on an in-person basis.

In 2019 an American bitcoin advocate named Mike Peterson who lived in the village of El Zonte began facilitating the distribution of an anonymous donation of $100,000 worth of bitcoin to local charities. The donation came with the stipulation that the village adopt a circular economy based on bitcoin. Many residents in El Zonte did not have access to banking services, and accessed bitcoin through mobile devices and Bitcoin ATMs in commercial areas. The village has since become known as "Bitcoin Beach", and has been cited as an example of using cryptocurrency as legal tender by advocates of bitcoin. As of 2022, Honduras and Guatemala had also made attempts to attract tourists through the use of bitcoin in "bitcoin hubs."

=== Adoption ===
On June 5, 2021, President of El Salvador Nayib Bukele announced a bill to adopt bitcoin as legal tender in El Salvador, via an English-language video at Bitcoin Conference 2021 in Miami. Bukele claimed that the adoption of bitcoin would make it easier for Salvadorans living abroad to send remittances to their relatives in the country. The use of bitcoin would also make digital transactions more accessible to underbanked people.

On June 9, 2021, the Legislative Assembly of El Salvador voted to adopt the Bitcoin Law, which would make the cryptocurrency legal tender in the country, with a majority vote of 62 of the 84 deputies in favor. The government announced that it had set aside $150 million in cash to back the country's bitcoin. The World Bank rejected a request from the government to assist with the implementation of the law due to transparency concerns and the environmental impact of bitcoin mining. The government announced that it would distribute US$30 in bitcoin to people who sign up to use an electronic wallet called Chivo (Salvadorean slang for 'cool'), at a cost of up to $75 million. Chivo is run by a private enterprise, but information regarding the platform and its policies are classified by the government.

In September 2021, a poll published by the Central American University found that 9 out of 10 Salvadorans did not have a clear understanding of what bitcoin was, and 68% disagreed with the decision to adopt it as legal tender. The government of El Salvador purchased ₿400, worth about $20.9 million at the time, on September 6. On September 7, 2021, the Bitcoin Law came into effect and bitcoin became legal tender in El Salvador, making it the first country in the world to do so. As part of this adoption, the government began requiring all businesses to accept it. Under the law, transactions in bitcoin are not subject to capital gains tax, and foreign bitcoin investors who invest over ₿3 in the country are eligible for permanent residence.

=== Reaction ===
The adoption of bitcoin as legal tender in El Salvador drew criticism both internationally, and within El Salvador. On 7 September, thousands of protestors gathered in San Salvador to protest the launch of Chivo and the adoption of bitcoin. The cause of these protests was concern over a lack of transparency regarding the creation of the Bitcoin Law and Chivo, and the use of tax dollars to purchase bitcoin. The limited rate of internet penetration in El Salvador would also limit the number of people who could make use of cryptocurrency.

Many international financial experts warned that bitcoin's volatility would introduce unnecessary risk and instability to El Salvador's underdeveloped economy. In July 2021, Moody's Investors Service downgraded the credit rating of El Salvador, citing Bukele's fiscal policies and the adoption of bitcoin as a factor. The day following El Salvador's adoption of bitcoin, Panamanian congressman Gabriel Silva proposed a similar bill that would give "legal, regulatory, and fiscal certainty to the use, holding and issuance of digital value and crypto assets in the Republic of Panama."

Some critics suggested that bitcoin's anonymity would make it easier to engage in money laundering and criminal activities. In particular, the potential use of bitcoin to evade taxes, and in transactions related to transnational gangs and human trafficking in El Salvador was noted.

According to a bitcoin company executive at the time of adoption, the measure could help modernize the country's financial system and lower the cost for remittances. The international cryptocurrency community was largely supportive of the law, which they believed could lead to a greater acceptance of cryptocurrency by states and central banks. Cryptocurrency advocates on Twitter and Instagram shared videos of people using bitcoin to make purchases at chains like Starbucks, Pizza Hut and McDonald's.

In November 2021, a poll by the Centro de Estudios Ciudadanos at Francisco Gavidia University found that 91% of Salvadorans preferred to use the US dollar over bitcoin. In January 2022, Fortune reported that the switch to bitcoin had made paying remittances more difficult for many Salvadorans, rather than easier as had been promised, because the fees associated with the bitcoin transactions were several times as expensive as traditional remittances.

In January 2022, the International Monetary Fund urged El Salvador to cease using bitcoin as legal tender, citing its risk to the country's financial stability, integrity and consumer protection. The IMF advised that the continued use of bitcoin would make it less likely that the institution would grant El Salvador a previously discussed loan of $1.3 billion.

== Usage of and economic impact of bitcoin in El Salvador ==
=== Immediate impact in 2021 ===
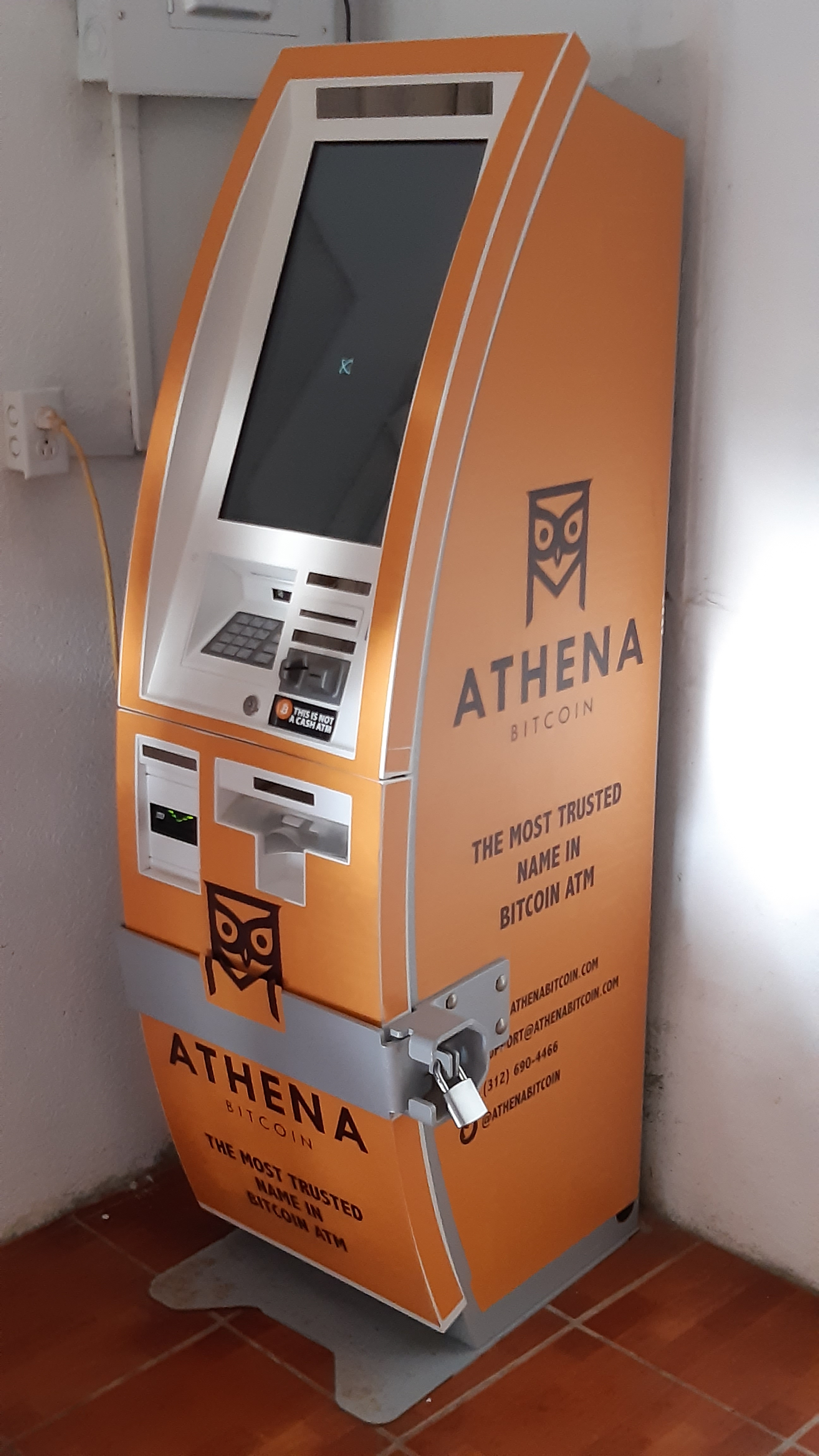
An Athena Bitcoin ATM in El Zonte, El Salvador

Chivo launched in October 2021, and immediately drew criticism for issues regarding features like payment processing and transactions. Shortly after midnight, Bukele confirmed via Twitter that the app was not available through either the Apple Store or Huawei, although Huawei later added it. Chivo was disabled a few hours after launch to allow the platform to increase the capacity of its servers. The system was also plagued by identity theft, which resulted in the theft of sign-on bonuses. Shortly after launch, Chivo announced that it was changing its pricing features to prevent scalping, which led to further complaints over the difficulty of day trading on Chivo and pricing discrepancies.

The majority of users stopped using the platform after they had collected their sign on bonuses. According to Financial Times, one of the country's largest banks reported that during the first week of Chivo's under 0.0001% of its transactions were in bitcoin.

In 2021, the government of El Salvador began purchasing bitcoin. It spent about $85.5 million on bitcoin between September 2021 and January 2022. The value of bitcoin began decreasing in November 2021, and had fallen by about 45% of its value by January 2022. It is estimated that the Salvadoran national reserves had lost $22 million as a result of this. The government continued to purchase bitcoins during this dip, and had holdings of at least ₿1,801 valued at $66 million as of January 2022.

Bukele announced that the government would use sustainable geothermal energy for bitcoin mining. The process uses large amounts of energy, which contributes to pollution if fossil fuels power it. Bukele announced plans to build Bitcoin City in November 2021, to be built in a circle at the base of the Conchagua volcano, which would provide geothermal energy for bitcoin mining. In the proposed city, income taxes would be waived for residents and businesses.

The announcement caused the value of El Salvador's overseas bonds to fall by 30% in December 2021. In 2022, the government began drafting legislation for the creation of $1 billion in "Volcano Bonds". Half of these bonds would fund Bukele's Bitcoin City, with the remaining half used to purchase bitcoin on a five-year lock up period.

Later that year, 100 days after the Bitcoin Law came into force, according to a survey done by the Central American University: 34.8% of the population had no confidence in bitcoin, 35.3% had little confidence, 13.2% had some confidence, and 14.1% had a lot of confidence. 56.6% of respondents had downloaded the government bitcoin wallet; among them 62.9% had not yet used it or used it only once, whereas 36.3% used bitcoin at least once a month.

=== Usage in 2022 ===
One year after bitcoin's adoption, economic surveys revealed low bitcoin usage in El Salvador. This limited adoption stemmed partly from insufficient digital literacy among the population. A study published by the US National Bureau of Economic Research found that 20% of people who downloaded the Chivo app did not use their $30 sign-on bonus. 61% of Chivo users stopped using the app after spending their bonus. Despite governmental support for universal bitcoin acceptance, only an estimated 20% of businesses accepted payment in bitcoin by 2022. The Salvadoran Chamber of Commerce found that only 14% of businesses in El Salvador had conducted bitcoin transactions between September 2021 and July 2022, while 3% felt that being able to use bitcoin was valuable. According to the Central Reserve Bank, bitcoin was used in 1.9% of remittance payments sent to El Salvador between September 2021 and April 2022. Media outlets reported that bitcoin had failed to increase tourist revenue, and that its use even in tourist hubs was limited to a minority of tourists. However, some businesses in El Zonte reported that they had seen a 30% increase in business from cryptocurrency tourists.

In March 2022, the Salvadoran government announced that the "Volcano Bonds" project had been postponed, citing global economic conditions and the Russian invasion of Ukraine as factors.

After the 2021–2022 cryptocurrency crash, bitcoin lost 70% of its value by June 2022 from a market high in November 2021. By this time, Bukele had spent about US$150 million, roughly 4% of El Salvador's national reserves, to invest in Bitcoin. According to BBC, the 2,300 bitcoins purchased by the Salvadoran government had lost 50% of their value as of mid-2022. El Salvador's economic growth rate declined during this time, and in response, Bukele decreased public expenditure, including water infrastructure and public services in some municipalities. He frequently responded to volatility in the cryptocurrency market by announcing on Twitter that he was "buying the dip." In June 2022, he bought an additional 80 bitcoin. The Salvadoran Minister of Finance Alejandro Zelaya stated that the country had not lost any money during the crash, because it did not sell any of its bitcoin.

Prior to the crash, several other countries had announced plans to adopt bitcoin as legal tender, but only the Central African Republic had done so by mid-2022.

=== 2023–2025 ===
By September 2023, two years after the Bitcoin Law went into effect, the Spanish newspaper of record El País reported that bitcoin adoption could not be called either a success or a failure, but should be understood as having outcomes of both. "When introducing the currency to the population, the idea was that it be used in all types of transactions: from buying street food to a property."

However, the hacking of hundreds of Chivo wallets had perhaps scared many, and only 1.3% of El Salvadoran remittances during 2023 had been transferred using cryptocurrencies, while even in Mexico, the amount was larger at 4%. And partially due to the longer history of US dollar legal tender in El Salvador, which provides some protection of purchasing power from inflation and devaluations, bitcoin adoption in Argentina likely surpasses that of El Salvador. The volatile bitcoin price resulted in El Salvador's bitcoin investments having lost approximately US$45 million with a bitcoin balance worth about US$76.5 million by September 2023. Mass adoption has been slowed by the absence of a coherent educational process across the country. On the other hand, it has resulted in significantly higher in-migration of businesses and capital to El Salvador, and has put the country, and Bukele, in headlines.

By December 2023, it was reported that the bitcoin purchased by Bukele's administration had risen in value, and were worth US$3.7 million more than they had been purchased for. However, the Bukele administration had not yet recouped the expense of the adoption and promotion of cryptocurrency.

As of March 2024, El Salvador's bitcoin gambit stood at a 50% profit, with bitcoin having recorded a new all-time high of over $69,000.

In December, 2024, El Salvador, in an agreement for a $1.4 billion loan from the IMF, agreed to reduce bitcoin purchases, removed the mandatory acceptance of bitcoin requirement on merchants, will no longer accept tax payments with the asset, and will wind-down its involvement in the Chivo wallet. An amendment to the Bitcoin law related to the agreement was passed in February 2025.

According to polls by the Instituto Universitario de Opinión Pública (Iudop) of the Universidad Centroamericana José Simeón Cañas (UCA), the percentage of Salvadorans who reported using bitcoin for transactions declined from 25.7% in 2021, to 21% in 2022, 12% in 2023 and 8.1% in 2024.

== Environmental impact ==
=== Energy consumption ===
Bitcoin’s global energy consumption was 83.91 TWh in October of 2021, which is 13 times El Salvador’s entire annual energy consumption. With the already existing gap between energy demand and supply, this additional energy widened the gap. Critics assert that this added consumption would lead to increased national inequality in access to energy, as 11% of households already have no direct access to electricity.

=== Geothermal energy ===
To mitigate bitcoin’s substantial energy requirements, the government planned to utilize geothermal energy from volcanoes. President Nayib Bukele announced the use of geothermal energy as a clean and renewable source to minimize environmental degradation. Currently, El Salvador has a capacity of 204.4MW across two geothermal installations, making it the largest producer of geothermal energy in Central America.

=== Water footprint ===
Bitcoin’s water footprint has facilitated El Salvador's existing water scarcity crisis, as water is necessary for cooling the mining equipment and generating electricity. This demand, along with the country's tropical environment, gave rise to concerns regarding the high water footprint of the operations. This scarcity is showcased in a 2023 survey finding that around 40% of citizens who received water one day a week only had access for under six hours. Communities have begun protesting the creation of new energy infrastructure for mining, such as wells for geothermal mining and solar plants along the Lempa River, due to declining access to drinking water.

=== E-waste ===
The mining itself contributes to a vast amount of electronic waste through outdated computers or ASICs. Particularly, bitcoin mines in Berlín and Usulután have been criticized for their contribution to this form of pollution which began with roughly 300 computers. Moreover, these computers have a lifespan of between six months and a year resulting in an excessive amount of electronic waste every year.

== See also ==
- Legality of bitcoin by country or territory
