= 2021 Salvadoran political crisis =

- 1M
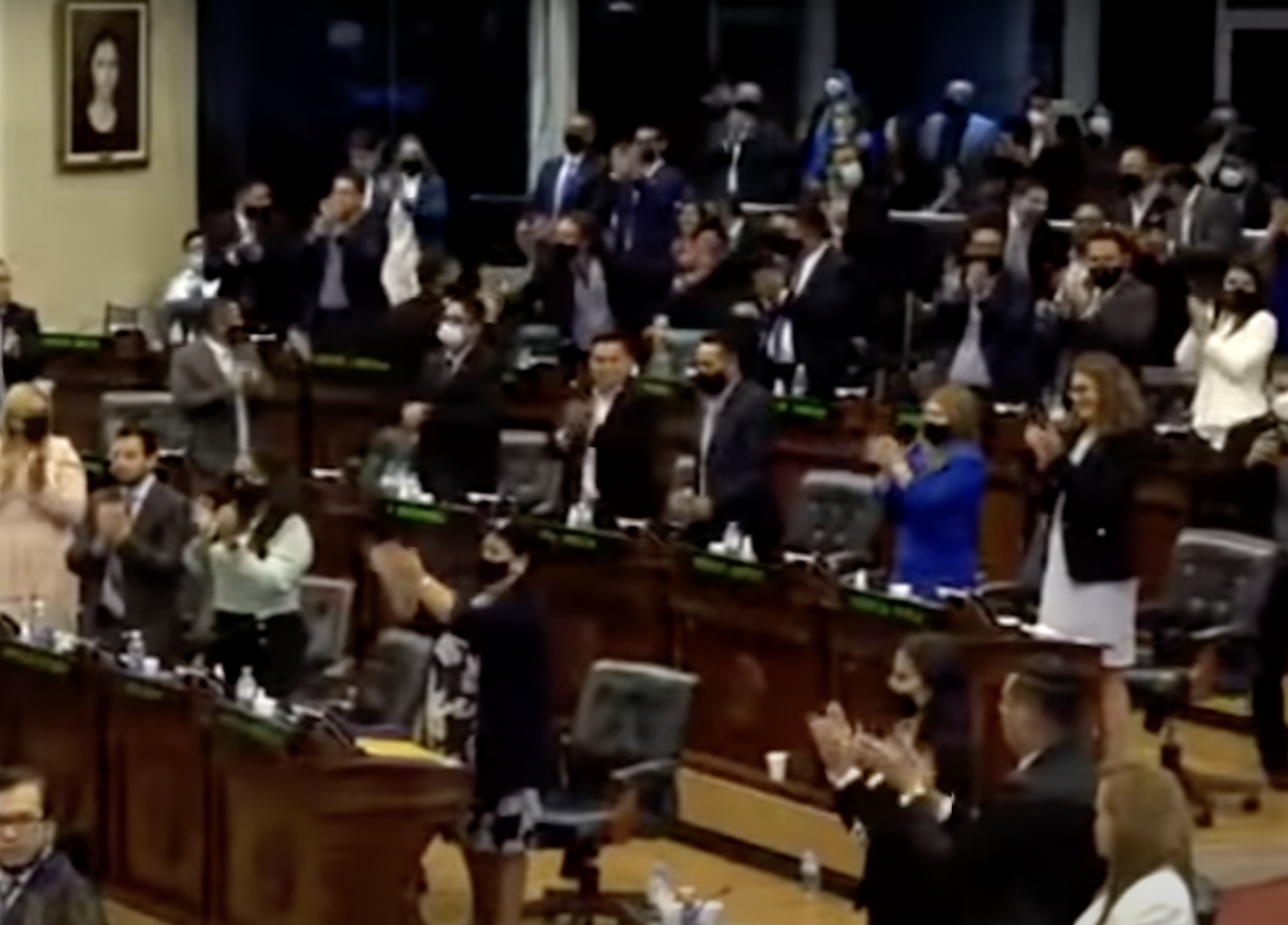
- Legislators of the Legislative Assembly applauding the removal of the magistrates of the Constitutional Chamber of the Supreme Court of Justice
- Date: 1 May 2021; 5 years ago
- Location: El Salvador
- Caused by: Nuevas Ideas victory in the 2021 legislative election
- Result: Removal and replacement of five primary and five alternate magistrates from the Constitutional Chamber of the Supreme Court; Removal and replacement of the Attorney General

Parties
Presidency; Legislative Assembly (government); NI; GANA; PCN; PDC; National Civil Police	Legislative Assembly (opposition); ARENA; FMLN; NT; V; Supreme Court of Justice; Attorney General's Office

Lead figures
Nayib Bukele; Ernesto Castro	Óscar Armando Pineda; Raúl Melara

The 2021 Salvadoran political crisis, known in El Salvador as 1M, occurred on 1 May 2021 when the Legislative Assembly of El Salvador, controlled by the Nuevas Ideas political party of President Nayib Bukele, voted to remove and replace all five primary and five alternate magistrates of the Constitutional Chamber of the Supreme Court of Justice (Note: The Supreme Court of Justice consists of four chambers: the Constitutional Chamber, the Civil Chamber, the Criminal Chamber, and the Administrative Chamber.) as well as the attorney general, Raúl Melara. The eleven removed officials had been opponents of Bukele's presidency and they were replaced by allies.

In El Salvador, supreme court magistrates and the attorney general are appointed by the Legislative Assembly. All members of the legislature, supreme court, and attorney general assumed office before Bukele in 2019 and clashed with him throughout the first two years of his presidency. Nuevas Ideas won the 2021 legislative election in a landslide. On the first day of the XIII Legislative Assembly, Nuevas Ideas and its allies—the Grand Alliance for National Unity, the National Coalition Party, and Christian Democratic Party—voted remove the magistrates and attorney general and replace them with Bukele's allies. The four parties combined held the supermajority necessary for the votes to pass. The opposition mostly voted against the removal of the supreme court justices; for Melara's removal, the opposition was split between voting against his removal and abstaining from voting.

Opposition legislators and media outlets referred to the removal and replacement of supreme court magistrates and the attorney general as a self-coup. The vote occurred one year after another political crisis when uniformed soldiers entered the Legislative Assembly during a vote to approve a loan for the Territorial Control Plan. Since the 1 May vote, several of Melara's investigations into Bukele's government were abandoned and the new magistrates of the Constitutional Chamber reinterpreted the constitution to allow Bukele to seek re-election in 2024.

== Background ==
Nayib Bukele won the 2019 Salvadoran presidential election as a member of the Grand Alliance for National Unity (GANA). He assumed office on 1 June 2019 but he lacked control of the Legislative Assembly which was led by a coalition consisting of the Nationalist Republican Alliance (ARENA), the National Coalition Party (PCN), and the Christian Democratic Party (PDC).

In addition to not controlling the Legislative Assembly, Bukele did not control the Supreme Court of Justice nor the Office of the Attorney General (FGR). Both supreme court magistrates and the attorney general are elected and appointed by the Legislative Assembly with no presidential input. At the time Bukele assumed office, the Legislative Assembly had most recently selected the magistrates of the Supreme Court of Justice in November 2018 to serve until 2027; it had most recently selected Attorney General Raúl Melara in December 2018 to serve until 2022.

== Prelude ==
During the first two years of Bukele's presidency, the Legislative Assembly, Supreme Court of Justice, and Melara all clashed with Bukele at various points. In February 2020, uniformed soldiers of the Salvadoran Army entered the meeting room of the Legislative Assembly after Bukele convened an extraordinary session to approve a US$109 million loan to finance his anti-crime Territorial Control Plan. The Legislative Assembly condemned and investigated the incident, while the Constitutional Chamber of the Supreme Court of Justice suspended all actions that derived from the extraordinary session (which it later deemed to have been unconstitutionally convened by Bukele) and ordered Bukele to not use the military in unconstitutional ways.

During the COVID-19 pandemic in 2020, Bukele ordered the National Civil Police (PNC) to arrest people who had allegedly violated a national lockdown order. The Constitutional Chamber ruled that it was unconstitutional to arrest people who had allegedly violated the lockdown order and ordered his government to stop; Bukele stated that he would not abide by the Constitutional Chamber's ruling. In late 2020, Melara opened an investigation into Bukele's government's conduct during the pandemic and raided 20 government offices searching for evidence of mishandling pandemic funds. Melara also opened investigations to determine if the government negotiated with gangs to lower the country's crime rate and to determine if Bukele's brothers had engaged in corruption.

== Votes to remove and replace officials ==
On 28 February 2021, Bukele's political party—Nuevas Ideas—won 56 of the Legislative Assembly's 84 seats in a legislative election. The XIII Legislative Assembly assumed office on 1 May 2021 and Ernesto Castro was elected as President of the Legislative Assembly. Nuevas Ideas became allies with GANA, the PCN, and the PDC; combined, they controlled a supermajority.

=== Constitutional Chamber magistrates ===
Following the vote of Castro, the Legislative Assembly then voted to remove all five judges of the Constitutional Chamber which had opposed Bukele in the past, citing that they had previously "issued arbitrary decisions." The vote ended with 64 in favor, 19 in opposition, and 1 abstention. Elisa Rosales, a leader of Nuevas Ideas, stated that there was "clear evidence" that the judges had impeded government conduct and that they had to be removed to protect the public. The judges who were removed were Óscar Armando Pineda Navas (the President of the Supreme Court), Aldo Enrique Cáder, Carlos Sergio Avilés, Carlos Ernesto Sánchez, and Marina de Jesús Marenco.

Vote to remove the magistrates of the Constitutional Chamber
Party Vote	Nuevas Ideas	Nationalist Republican Alliance	Grand Alliance for National Unity	Farabundo Martí National Liberation Front	National Coalition Party	Christian Democratic Party	Nuestro Tiempo	Vamos	Total
Party Vote	NI	ARENA	GANA	FMLN	PCN	PDC	NT	V	Total
Aye	56	–	5	–	2	1	–	–	64
Nay	–	14	–	3	–	–	1	1	19
Abstain	–	–	–	–	–	–	–	–	0
Absent	–	–	–	1	–	–	–	–	1
Total	56	14	5	4	2	1	1	1	84

At the time of the vote, the magistrates were not at their offices. National Civil Police officers subsequently surrounded the Supreme Court of Justice building. They were instructed to prevent the removed magistrates from re-entering their offices and to allow the newly appointed magistrates to assume their positions.

=== Attorney general ===
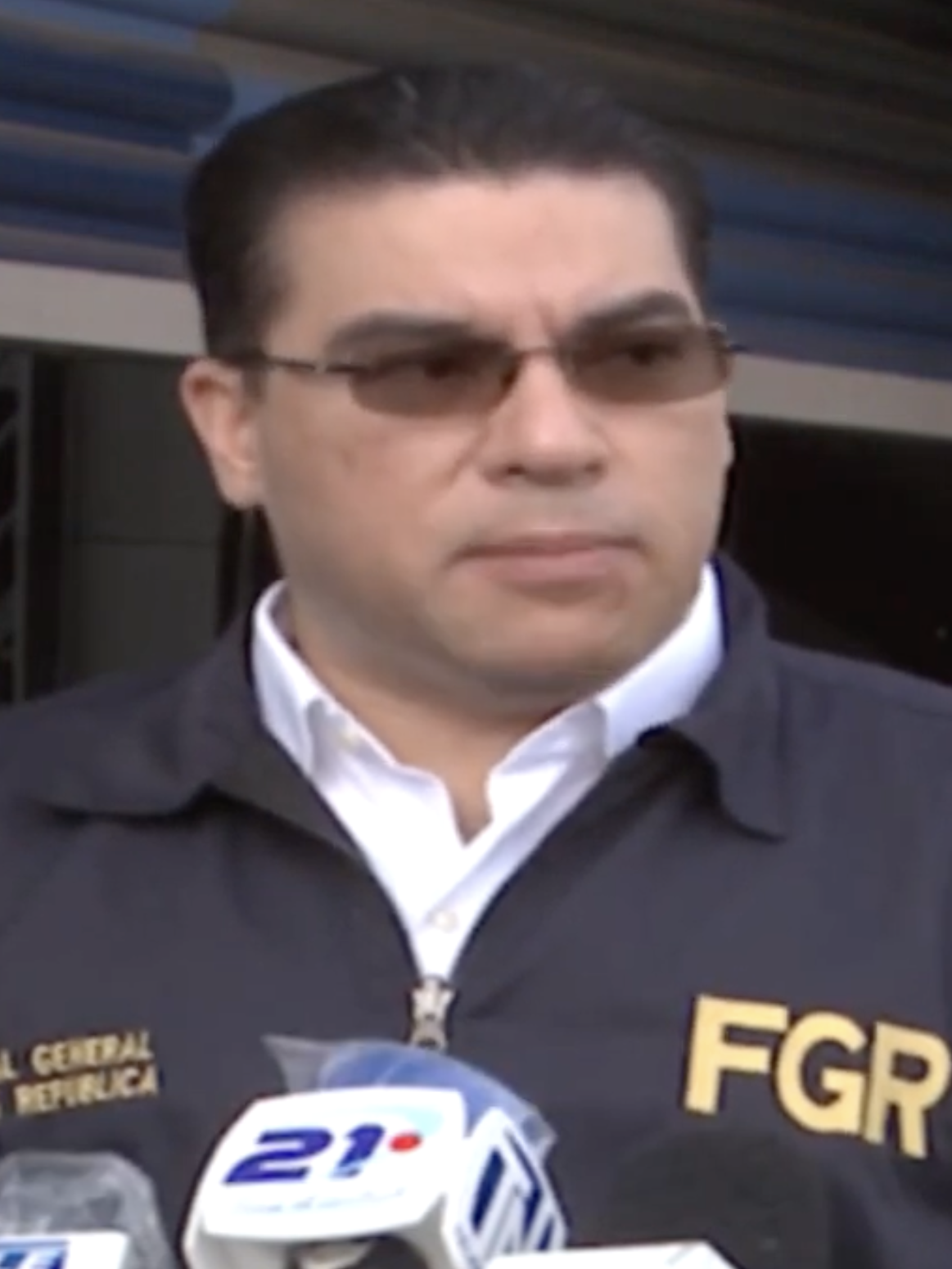
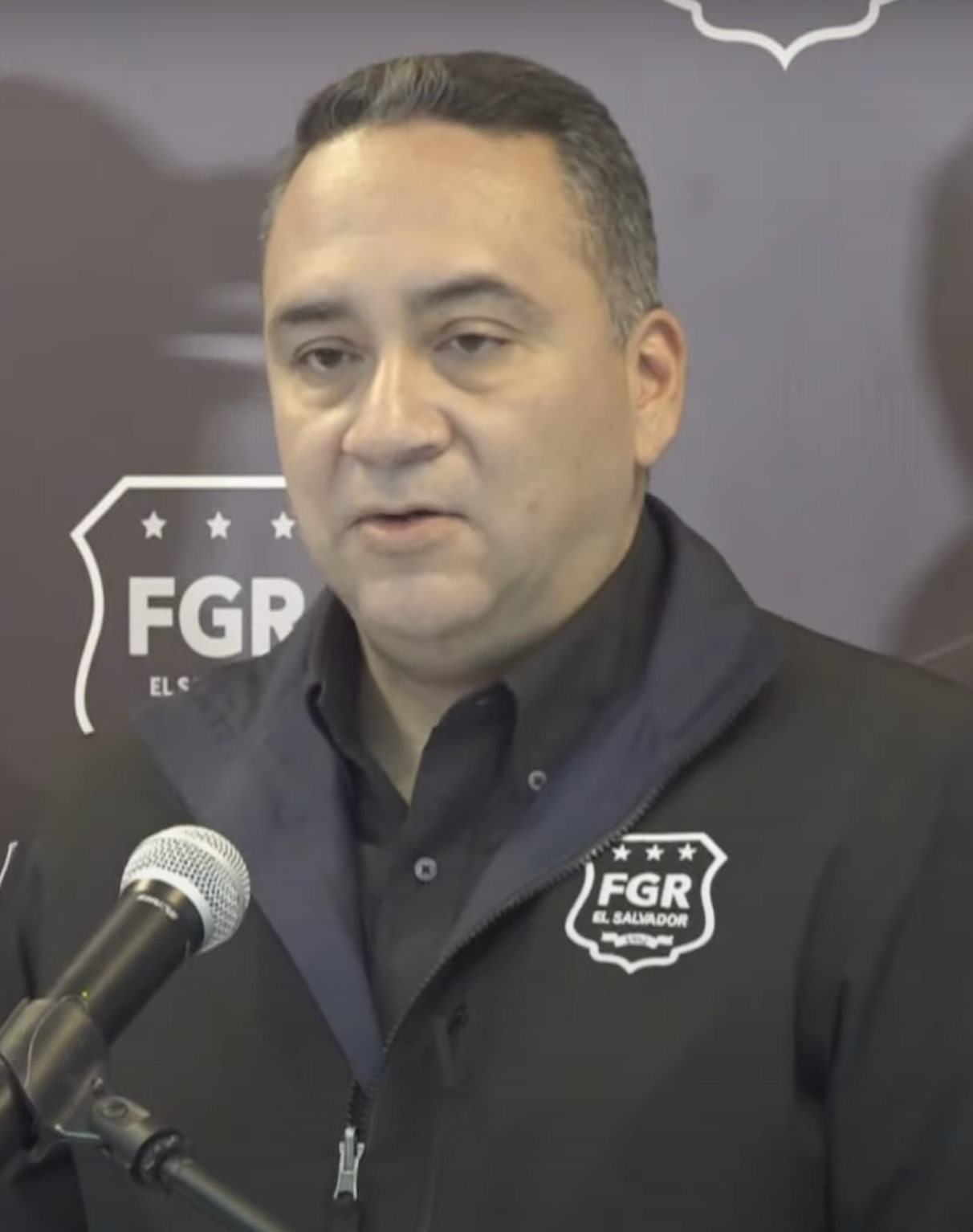
Raúl Melara (left), who was removed by the Legislative Assembly by a 64–7–11 vote, and Rodolfo Delgado (right), who replaced Melara

Later that same day, the Legislative Assembly also voted to remove Melara as Attorney General, and he later presented his resignation. Rodolfo Delgado replaced Melara as attorney general on 2 May 2021. Five new judges were appointed on 3 May 2021, all of whom were supporters of Bukele. The new judges were Óscar Alberto López Jerez, who replaced Pineda Navas as President of the Supreme Court, Luis Javier Suárez Magaña, Héctor Nahúm García, José Ángel Pérez Chacón, and Elsy Dueñas Lovos, and they were each given armed guards as personal bodyguards.

Vote to remove Attorney General Raúl Melara
Party Vote	Nuevas Ideas	Nationalist Republican Alliance	Grand Alliance for National Unity	Farabundo Martí National Liberation Front	National Coalition Party	Christian Democratic Party	Nuestro Tiempo	Vamos	Total
Party Vote	NI	ARENA	GANA	FMLN	PCN	PDC	NT	V	Total
Aye	56	–	5	–	2	1	–	–	64
Nay	–	3	–	3	–	–	1	–	7
Abstain	–	10	–	1	–	–	–	–	11
Absent	–	1	–	–	–	–	–	1	2
Total	56	14	5	4	2	1	1	1	84

== Legality ==
After the vote to remove the Constitutional Chamber magistrates, the magistrates ruled that their removal was unconstitutional.

According to the Due Process of Law Foundation, the removal of the Constitutional Chamber magistrates was unconstitutional. It cited Judgement of Unconstitutionality 19-2012, issued by the Constitutional Chamber in June 2012, that ruled that magistrates of the Constitutional Court may not be removed from office or reassigned to another chamber during their term. It also noted that were was no legal process to remove supreme court magistrates for disciplinary reasons. The Due Process of Law Foundation asserted that the Legislative Assembly "violated the Constitution and the rights recognized in international human rights treaties, specifically the irremovability of judges from office—which is inherent to the principle of judicial independence—and due process guarantees". The foundation also noted that the magistrates appointed to replace those who had been removed did not go through the approval process mandated by the constitution—involving interviews and merit evaluations—when appointing supreme court magistrates.

The Due Process of Law Foundation also asserted that the supreme court magistrates from the Civil, Criminal, and Administrative Chambers could have refused accept the replacement of the Constitutional Chamber's magistrates on the basis that their appointment was unconstitutional. The foundation noted that the remaining magistrates could have opposed the appointments by citing the Code of Judicial Ethics or they could have refused to sit alongside the appointed magistrates to prevent quorum from being met. Neither of these scenarios occurred.

== Aftermath ==
The voting out of the judges and the Attorney General has been labeled as a coup, a self-coup, a powerplay, and a power grab by several news outlets and the political opposition of El Salvador as it gave Bukele and Nuevas Ideas increased political power. It has also been labeled as a "threat to democracy."

== Reactions ==
=== Domestic reactions ===
René Portillo Cuadra, a deputy from the Nationalist Republican Alliance (ARENA), stated, "What happened last night in the Legislative Assembly, with a majority that the people gave them through the vote, is a coup. Many of Bukele's supporters and followers, the Armed Forces of El Salvador, and the National Civil Police supported the actions of the Legislative Assembly.

=== International reactions ===
Countries

- United States:
  - Kamala Harris, the Vice President of the United States, stated that the United States government held "deep concerns" about democracy in El Salvador.
  - Antony Blinken, the United States Secretary of State, made a statement expressing "serious concern" regarding the removal of the Attorney General, adding, "Democratic governance requires respecting the separation of powers, for the good of all Salvadorans."
  - On 20 September, the U.S. announced that it was adding the five newly appointed magistrates to the United States' Undemocratic and Corrupt Actors list.
  - Jim McGovern, the Representative of Massachusetts's 2nd congressional district, stated that he was "disturbed and angered" by the Legislative Assembly's action, adding, "this is not democracy, this is the destruction of an independent judiciary and the rule of law."
- Venezuela: Julio Borges, the Special Commissioner for Foreign Relations for Juan Guaidó, called Bukele's government a dictatorship, stating that "There are no good or bad dictatorships: there are dictatorships."

International organizations

- European Union: Josep Borrell, the High Representative of the Union for Foreign Affairs and Security Policy of the EU, expressed concern about the situation in El Salvador, stating that the removal of the judges and the Attorney General "put in doubt the rule of law [in El Salvador]."
- Organization of American States: The OAS condemned the action, stating: "the fullest respect for the democratic rule of law is essential."
- United Nations: Diego García Sayán, the United Nations' special investigator on the independence of legal systems, stated: "I condemn the steps the political power is taking to dismantle and weaken the judicial independence of the magistrates by removing the members of the constitutional chamber."

Several human rights groups have condemned the action and accused Bukele of allowing the political crisis to happen. Juan Pappier, the Senior Americas researcher of Human Rights Watch, stated that Bukele had "dismantle[d] all the internal checks and balances on his power." The Central American University (UCA) stated: "In this dark hour for our already weak democracy, the UCA calls for the defense of what was built after the war at the cost of so much effort and so many lives: a society where saying 'no' to power is not a fantasy."

== See also ==
- List of Salvadoran coup d'états
