= El Faro (digital newspaper) =

Central American digital newspaper

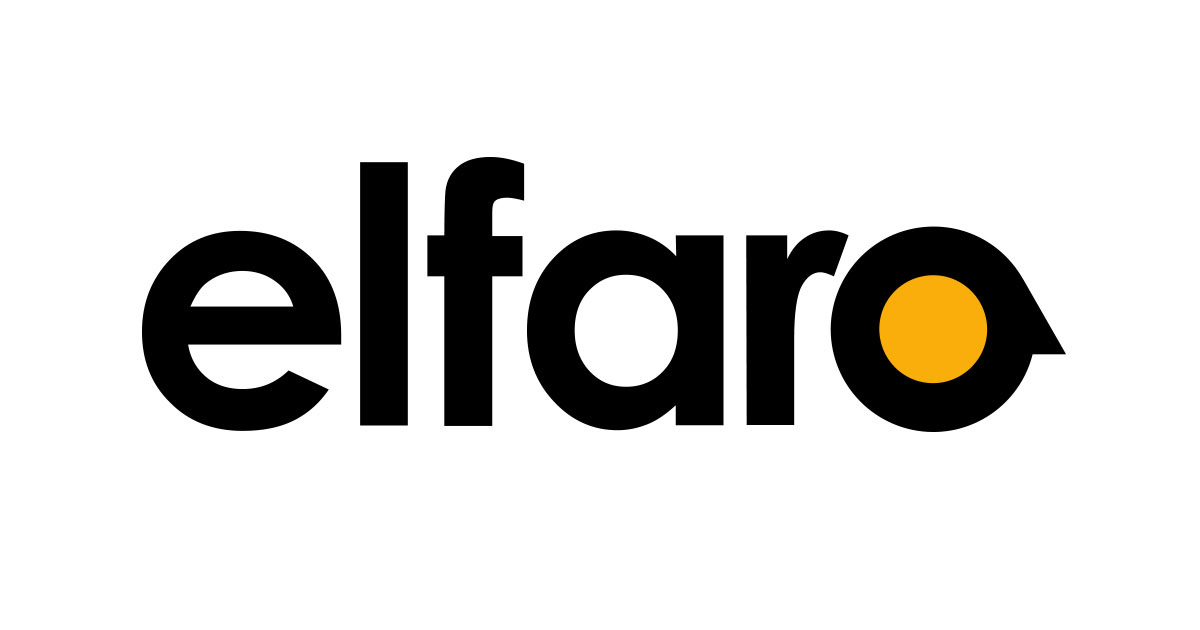
- Type: Weekly newspaper
- Format: Digital newspaper
- Owner(s): Carlos Dada and Jorge Simán
- Founder(s): Carlos Dada and Jorge Simán
- Publisher: Fundación Periódica
- Editor-in-chief: Óscar Martínez
- Editor: Sergio Arauz
- General manager: Carlos Salamanca
- Opinion editor: María Luz Nóchez
- Photo editor: Víctor Peña
- Staff writers: Carlos Martínez, José Luis Sanz, Nelson Rauda, Jimmy Alvarado, Efren Lemus, María Luz Nóchez, Gabriel Labrador, Gabriela Cáceres, Julie López, Julia Gavarrete, Roman Gressier, Rebeca Monge, the photojournalists Víctor Peña, Carlos Barrera and in the creation of infographics and interactive materials Daniel Reyes, Alex Santos and Daniel Bonilla.
- Financial Administrative Manager: Mauricio Sandoval
- Founded: April 25, 1998
- Language: Spanish & English
- Headquarters: San José, Costa Rica
- Country: El Salvador
- Website: ElFaro.net

El Faro is a Central American digital news outlet founded in 1998 in El Salvador. In April 2023, El Faro moved its administrative and legal operations to San José, Costa Rica, registering the newsroom as the non-profit Fundación Periódica. The bulk of the newsroom is based in San Salvador, El Salvador, with reporters in Guatemala City, Guatemala and in Washington, D.C., United States.

Since the first day of publication, El Faro "has hewed to the idea that journalism is important for the development of democracy," defending "an independent editorial line that defends freedom of the press and expression and promotes a critical analysis of current events in El Salvador and the region. This has permitted El Faro to maintain an editorial stance critical of different governments, whether left- or right-leaning, who have alternated in power since the news outlet was founded."

In 2019, El Faro launched its English-language edition, which includes a weekly newsletter on Central American current events.

== History ==
El Faro published its first article on May 14, 1998, making it the first internet-native, digital-only news outlet in Latin America. It was founded by journalist Carlos Dada and businessman Jorge Simán, both from El Salvador, on April 25, 1998. Dada has served as editorial director since the outlet's founding, with the exception of six years: The newsroom was helmed from September 2014 until December 2020 by Spanish journalist José Luis Sanz. Simán oversaw business operations until 2015.

Dada and Simán were the only shareholders until 2014 when, as part of the collective spirit of the project, Sanz was the first member of the newsroom to receive shares. At the time of El Faro's transfer to Costa Rica in 2023, the owners, apart from Dada, Simán, and Sanz, were Carlos Martínez, Sergio Arauz, Daniel Valencia, Óscar Martínez, Ricardo Vaquerano and Élmer Menjívar. Each of them is a current or former member of El Faro.

El Faro began without any financial resources, leading to the creation of a digital-only news site instead of a print newspaper. The first generation of El Faro journalists were mostly college students; writer Francisco Andrés Escobar recommended his best pupils to Dada to form the newsroom. For years they met every day in an office lent to them by Jorge Simán to publish their first articles. In 2023, El Faro had a staff of 35 full-time employees.

El Faro has developed into a multimedia journalism organization covering politics, corruption, organized crime, violence, inequality, historical memory, and migration across Central America and its diasporas.

Apart from its digital print coverage in its Spanish and English editions, the outlet has over the years produced short and full-length documentary films, a weekly radio show, podcast channels in Spanish and English, and internationally acclaimed books compiling and translating its reporting.

From October 2008 to December 2009, El Faro produced "En el camino" ("Along the Path"), in-depth multimedia coverage of Central American migration. For a year and a half, a team of reporters, documentary filmmakers, and photographers from the Spanish collective Ruido Photo traveled the trails of undocumented migrants from Central America through Mexico, revealing grave human rights abuses, the weaknesses of Mexican migration policy, and drug traffickers' role in the violence inflicted upon migrants. This project resulted in a series of long-form chronicles —which were published regularly in El Faro and later edited into books by Spanish publishers Icaria and Blume— and a documentary, produced in collaboration with the International Film and Television School of San Antonio de Los Baños, Cuba.

In 2011, El Faro founded Sala Negra, an investigative team that gained widespread acclaim for its coverage of violence and public security in Central America, with a focus on gangs, drug trafficking and organized crime. Sala Negra offered the first coverage of violence in Central America from a regional perspective, investigating the internal dynamics and historical mutations of the Mara Salvatrucha-13 (MS-13) and 18th Street Gangs, analyzing the impact of public policy and state absence in processes of violence, and profiling some of the largest drug trafficking groups in the region.

Among El Faro's most renowned works is the 2010 interview, "How We Killed Monseñor Romero," in which Captain Álvaro Saravia, of the Salvadoran Armed Forces, confessed the details of how he conspired in planning the 1980 assassination of Monsignor Óscar Arnulfo Romero.

The outlet has also co-produced journalistic projects with international outlets and newsrooms including The New York Times, El País, Univision, Radio Ambulante, and the International Consortium of Investigative Journalists (ICIJ). El Faro worked alongside ICIJ in the Panama Papers and Paradise Papers investigations, as well as in Mining Secrets, a 2021 transnational journalism project led by Forbidden Stories, focused on the illegal operation of a Swiss-Russian nickel mine in Guatemala.

== English Edition ==
In October 2019, El Faro launched El Faro English, a project set on expanding the outlet's international audience and impact. The project began as a weekly current events newsletter and has evolved into an English-language edition that also encompasses original English-language reporting and analysis and adapts El Faro's Spanish-language work for an anglophone audience primarily living in the United States.

In addition to providing socio-political information on Central America to international policymakers, researchers and academics, NGO and aid workers, and journalists, El Faro English seeks to serve and gain relevance in diaspora communities through original reporting focused on their migratory history and processes, political and cultural evolution, current ties to their countries of origin, and the U.S. policies affecting their lives and the future of Central America.

== Other projects ==
Since 2010, El Faro has organized the Central American Journalism Forum (ForoCAP), an annual gathering open to the public where journalists from across the hemisphere meet for professional training, to debate industry issues, and to find solutions to shared challenges. At ForoCAP 2022 in Antigua Guatemala, a collective of three-dozen journalists from across the region announced the launch of the Network of Central American Journalists, a historic and unprecedented initiative to defend the profession from state-sponsored attacks.

== Books ==
- Los migrantes que no importan (Icaria, 2010), translated as The Beast: Riding the Rails and Dodging Narcos on the Migrant Trail (Verso, 2013), by Óscar Martínez.
- En el camino (Blume, 2010), photo essays by Edu Ponces, Toni Arnau, and Eduard Soteras.
- Crónicas negras. Desde una región que no cuenta (Aguilar, 2013), a selection of publications from Sala Negra authors.
- Una historia de violencia. Vida y muerte en Centroamérica (Debate, 2018), translated as A History of Violence: Living and Dying in Central America (Verso, 2016), by Óscar Martínez.
- Carta desde Zacatraz (Libros del KO, 2018), by Roberto Valencia.
- Crónicas desde la región más violenta (Debate, 2019), a selection of publications from Sala Negra authors.

== Films ==
- "Maria in No Man's Land" (El Salvador/Mexico, 2011), documentary directed by Marcela Zamora.
- "The Broken Mirror" (El Salvador, 2013), documentary directed by Marcela Zamora.
- "The Room of Bones" (El Salvador, 2015), documentary directed by Marcela Zamora.
- "The Offended" (El Salvador, 2016), documentary directed by Marcela Zamora.
- "Unforgivable" (El Salvador/Spain, 2020), documentary short directed by Marlén Viñayo
