= Bitcoin Law =

El Salvador legislation

Legislative Assembly of El Salvador
- Territorial extent: El Salvador
- Enacted: 8 June 2021
- Effective: 7 September 2021
- Status: In force

The Bitcoin Law (Spanish: Ley Bitcoin, pronounced [ˈlej biðˈkojn]) was passed by the Legislative Assembly of El Salvador on 8 June 2021, giving the cryptocurrency bitcoin the status of legal tender within El Salvador after 7 September 2021. It was proposed by President Nayib Bukele. The text of the law stated that "the purpose of this law is to regulate bitcoin as unrestricted legal tender with liberating power, unlimited in any transaction, and to any title that public or private natural or legal persons require carrying out". The law was substantially rescinded on January 29, 2025, after a Bukele government deal with the International Monetary Fund to remove bitcoin's official status in return for a loan.

== History ==
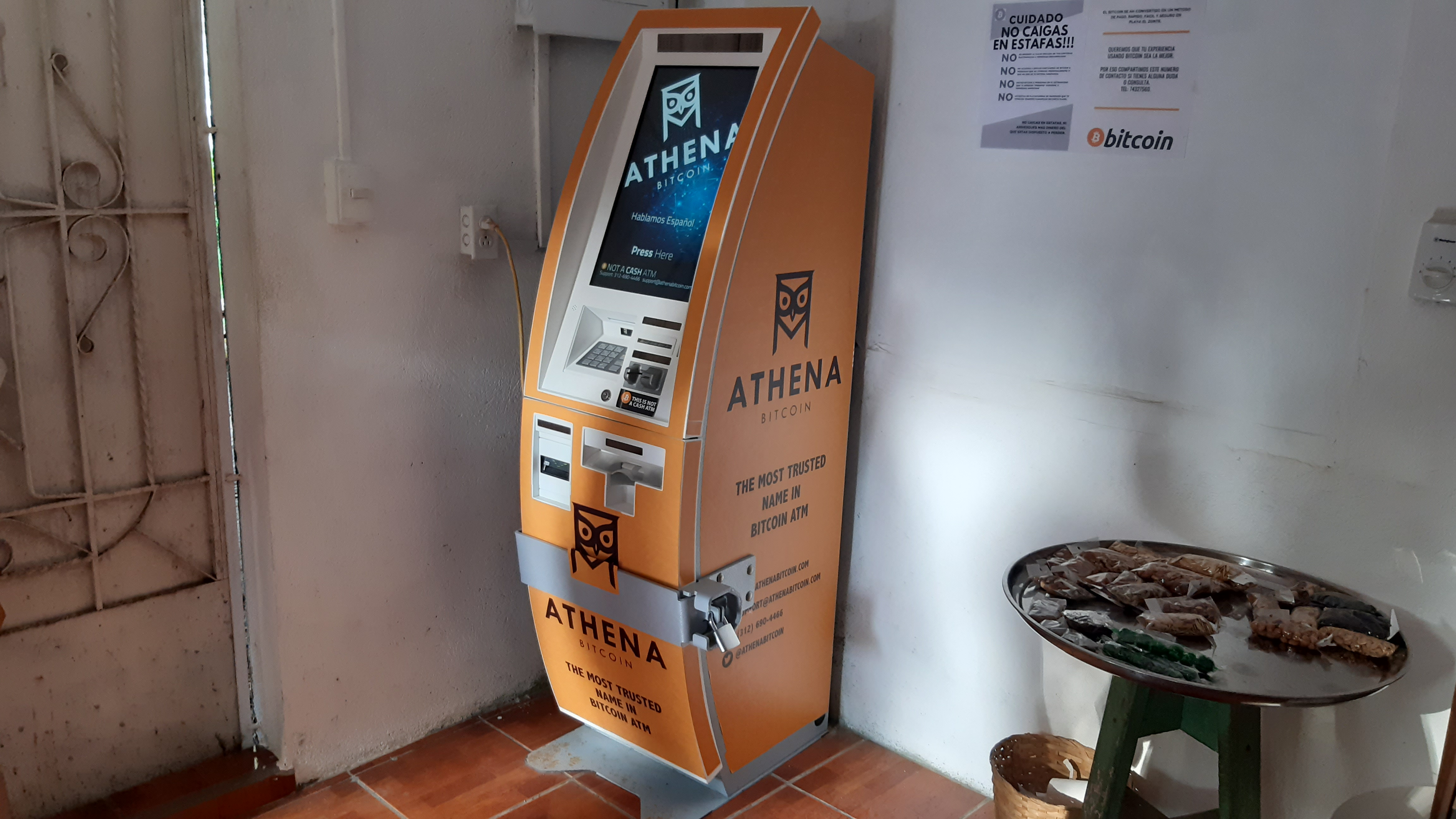
Bitcoin ATM in El Zonte, El Salvador

Bitcoin use as a currency in El Salvador had been experimented with since at least 2019, and current President Bukele expressed interest in bitcoin while he was mayor of San Salvador in 2017. Bloomberg News reported in June 2021 that Bukele and some members of the Nuevas Ideas party had owned Bitcoin for years.

The coastal village of El Zonte has had an active experiment underway to use bitcoin in the local economy since 2019, where some workers have received their salary and can pay bills in bitcoin, and others use it to buy food and other goods from local shops.

At a conference for bitcoin in Miami in June 2021, President Bukele announced that he would be looking to promulgate a law allowing bitcoin as legal tender, saying that it would "generate jobs and help provide financial inclusion to thousands outside the formal economy". According to Bukele, the law is aimed at the approximately 70% of Salvadorans without bank accounts, and will increase inclusion for them. Bukele argued that the bill would increase investment as well as reducing fees from current services for remittances. In pushing the bill, Bukele cooperated with Strike, a financial service firm which uses the Lightning Network for settlement, and Jack Mallers, its CEO.

The law was passed by the Legislative Assembly on 9 June 2021, with a majority vote of 62 out of 84. Bitcoin became legal tender on 7 September 2021, 90 days after the publication of the law in the official gazette, which makes El Salvador the first country to have bitcoin as legal tender. Bitcoin joined the United States dollar as the second official currency of El Salvador.

El Salvador's government continued to buy bitcoin in the following years under a publicly announced policy, run by the country's Bitcoin Office, of purchasing about one bitcoin per day. By December 2024 the country's holdings had grown to roughly 5,969 bitcoin, worth close to 600 million US dollars. That month the government reached a preliminary agreement with the International Monetary Fund for a 1.4 billion dollar loan, under which it committed to make private-sector bitcoin acceptance voluntary, confine public-sector bitcoin activity, restrict tax payments to US dollars, and gradually wind down the government's Chivo wallet. The Legislative Assembly approved the resulting reform on 29 January 2025 by a vote of 55 to 2.

== Reception ==
The law was commented on as something of good "PR value" for Bukele, as a "young president trying to capitalise on a popular image". It was also criticized due to the volatility of bitcoin when used as an investment, and the high transaction fees when used as a method of payment.

Siobhan Morden of Amherst Pierpont commented that the law could bring complications to Bukele's talks with the International Monetary Fund. She noted that the law would "likely only compound concerns about corruption, money laundering and the independence of regulatory agencies." Carlos de Sousa of Vontobel Asset Management expressed concerns that the decentralized system would lead to easier money laundering and tax avoidance. According to Ernst & Young, the adoption of bitcoin as legal tender by El Salvador could have consequences for US taxpayers holding the cryptocurrency, because "If more countries adopt bitcoin as legal tender, the US federal income tax treatment of bitcoin could change. Instead of being treated as an investment that is a capital asset, bitcoin could be treated as generating ordinary income under Section 988."

In an August 2021 poll conducted by Salvadoran newspaper La Prensa Gráfica, a majority of people polled said they opposed the Bitcoin Law, and almost three quarters of respondents said they would not accept bitcoin as payment.

According to a December 2021 survey done by the Central American University 100 days after the Bitcoin Law came into force: 34.8% of the population had no confidence in Bitcoin, 35.3% had little confidence, 13.2% had some confidence, and 14.1% had a lot of confidence. In the first six months after the establishment of the Bitcoin Law, 56.6% of respondents had downloaded the government Bitcoin wallet; among them 62.9% had not yet used it or only once whereas 36.3% used Bitcoin at least once a month. 48.5% of respondents thought then that the Bitcoin Law should be abolished.

An academic study by economists Fernando Alvarez, David Argente and Diana Van Patten, based on a nationally representative face-to-face survey of 1,800 households and an analysis of blockchain transaction data, found that use of bitcoin and the Chivo wallet for everyday payments was low, concentrated, and had been decreasing since the law's introduction. Salvadorans who were aware of Chivo were disproportionately likely to be banked, educated, young, and male, in contrast with the law's stated goal of extending financial inclusion to the unbanked. Only 20% of firms accepted bitcoin, and just 11.4% of firms reported any positive sales in the cryptocurrency. Later annual surveys by the Central American University's Institute of Public Opinion (Iudop) found that the share of Salvadorans who had used bitcoin to buy or pay for something fell from 25.7% in 2021 to 21% in 2022, 12% in 2023, and 8.1% in 2024, the lowest level recorded since the law's adoption.

== Implementation ==
The new law took effect on 7 September 2021. In the early hours after the law took effect and the official launch of new technologies to deal with a major change to the national currency infrastructure, the government had to take its bitcoin e-wallet, Chivo, offline due to excessive load. The Bukele government increased server capacity and brought the e-wallet back online by mid-day. 7 September 2021 also saw a crash in bitcoin to its lowest in almost a month, causing the country to experience a 3 million USD paper loss. The Salvadoran government tried to rectify this by buying bitcoin, allowing the price to rise above 52,000 USD. Due to concerns about bitcoin's volatility, as a result, over 1,000 protestors gathered outside the Supreme Court of El Salvador to protest the law. Chivo was initially rejected by many platforms early on the first day, but became increasingly accepted by them.

A month after adoption of the Bitcoin Law, more El Salvadorans have Bitcoin wallets than traditional bank accounts. The most popular bitcoin wallet—the government's officially-sponsored Chivo wallet—had been downloaded by three million people, "amounting to 46 percent of the population. By contrast, as of 2017, only 29 percent of Salvadorans had bank accounts." The use of the Chivo wallet has been incentivized by the government with US$30 seed money deposited into every Salvadoran's account. Other Lightning-enabled bitcoin wallets may be used by Salvadorans in lieu of Chivo. In addition, many of the largest gas stations in the country are offering a 20 cents per gallon discount on gasoline for those who pay through the Chivo app. One month on, 12 percent of Salvadoran consumers have used the cryptocurrency, but 93 percent of companies surveyed reported receiving no payments in bitcoin during the first month. Chivo failed to gain broad traction among Salvadorans, and as part of the 2025 IMF-driven reform the government wound the wallet down, while private bitcoin wallets continued to operate in the country.

== See also ==
- Legality of cryptocurrencies by country or territory
- Petro, state-issued cryptocurrency of Venezuela
- Bitcoin City, a planned smart city project announced in 2021
