= 2020 Salvadoran political crisis =

- 9F, El Bukelazo
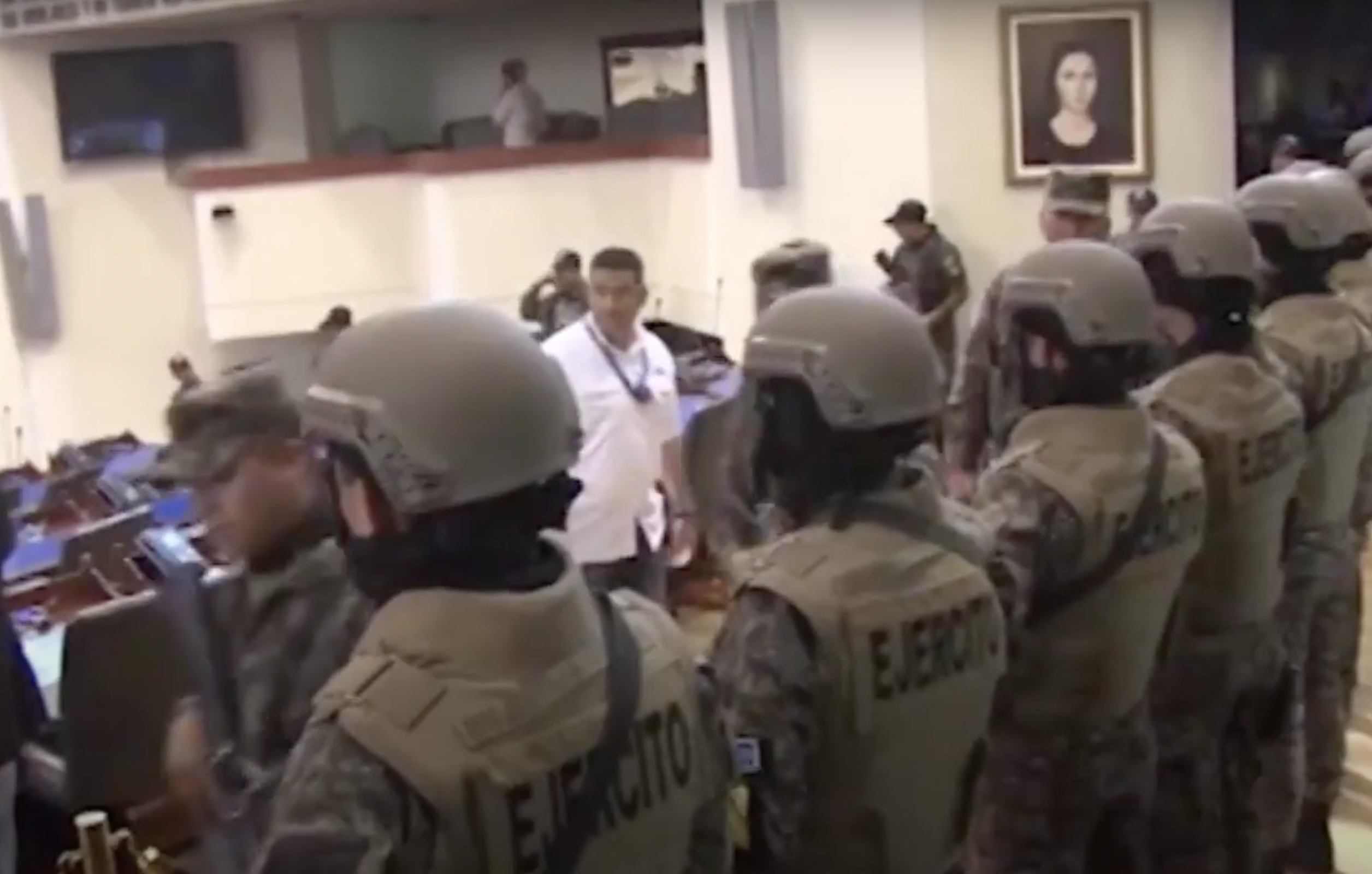
- Soldiers in the Legislative Assembly
- Date: 9 February 2020; 6 years ago
- Location: El Salvador
- Caused by: Refusal by the Legislative Assembly to approve a US$109 million loan for the Territorial Control Plan
- Methods: Nayib Bukele invokes article 167 to convene the Legislative Assembly; Soldiers enter the legislative chamber during the session
- Result: Loan not approved; Supreme Court order to desist; Legislative investigation into the events that transpired; Order to remove Mauricio Arriaza Chicas as police director; Demonstrations in support and opposition of Nayib Bukele

Parties
| Presidency; Armed Forces; National Civil Police; Political support: GANA; CD | Legislative Assembly; Supreme Court of Justice; Political opposition: ARENA; FMLN; PCN; PDC |

Lead figures
| Nayib Bukele; Guillermo Gallegos; Mauricio Arriaza Chicas; René Merino Monroy | Mario Ponce (not present) |

A political crisis, sometimes called 9F or El Bukelazo, occurred in El Salvador on 9 February 2020 when uniformed soldiers entered the Blue Chamber (meeting room) of the Legislative Assembly. The incursion occurred amidst a political dispute between Salvadoran president Nayib Bukele and the legislature regarding the approval of a US$109 million loan to fund the Territorial Control Plan.

Shortly after becoming president, Bukele implemented the Territorial Control Plan to curb crime in El Salvador. For phase three of his plan to modernize the National Civil Police's (PNC) equipment, Bukele needed the Legislative Assembly to approve a US$109 million loan to finance the new equipment. The legislature, controlled by the political opposition, questioned the transparency on how the loan's money would be allocated. On 6 February 2020, Bukele invoked article 167 of the constitution to force the legislature to convene an extraordinary session to vote on the loan.

On 9 February, soldiers entered the legislative chamber during the extraordinary session where a minority of legislators were present. Bukele later entered the legislative chamber and prayed before leaving and addressing a crowd of his supporters. Bukele criticized the Legislative Assembly for not reaching quorum and threatened to invoke article 87—the Salvadoran people's "right to insurrection"—against the legislature for supposedly violating constitutional order. The following day, the Supreme Court of Justice ordered Bukele to desist, and he complied. The Legislative Assembly established a special commission to investigate who was responsible for the incursion and summoned government officials such as Attorney General Raúl Melara and Minister of National Defense René Merino Monroy to testify. In its final report, the commission demanded that PNC director Mauricio Arriaza Chicas be removed for his role in the political crisis and that Merino Monroy and two colonels should resign; none were removed or resigned.

The military's incursion into the Legislative Assembly was condemned by the opposition as an coup attempt or a self-coup. Political scientists and non-governmental organizations also criticized the event and warned of democratic backsliding. Salvadorans protested both in favor and against the events of 9 February.

== Background ==
The XII Legislative Assembly was elected in March 2018 and assumed office the following May. The Legislative Assembly was controlled by a coalition consisting of the Nationalist Republican Alliance (ARENA), the National Coalition Party (PCN), and the Christian Democratic Party (PDC), with an agreement to alternate the legislature's presidency between ARENA's Norman Quijano (May 2018 to October 2019) and the PCN's Mario Ponce (November 2019 to April 2021). The opposition consisted of the Farabundo Martí National Liberation Front (FMLN), the Grand Alliance for National Unity (GANA), Democratic Change (CD), and an independent.

The FMLN controlled the presidency at the time that the XII Legislative Assembly assumed office, but President Salvador Sánchez Cerén was constitutionally prohibited from seeking a second consecutive five-year term in the 2019 presidential election. The FMLN nominated Sánchez Cerén's foreign minister, Hugo Martínez, for president, while ARENA nominated businessman Carlos Calleja and Vamos nominated businessman Josué Alvarado. The election's frontrunner, however, was Nayib Bukele, a former mayor of San Salvador who was expelled from the FMLN in 2017. Bukele ran with GANA after the Supreme Electoral Court (TSE) refused to register his political party, Nuevas Ideas (NI), in time for the 2019 election. Bukele won the election in the first round with 53% of the vote, breaking the ARENA–FMLN 30-year duopoly on controlling the presidency.

== Prelude ==
Bukele became President of El Salvador on 1 June 2019, and on 20 June, he implemented the Territorial Control Plan, his security plan to combat crime. Phase one involved deploying soldiers and police officers to high-crime areas, and phase two consisted of implementing measures to prevent Salvadorans from turning to crime. Phase three, "Modernization", called for the procurement of new equipment for the National Civil Police (PNC) such as uniforms, vehicles, surveillance equipment, and a helicopter. Acquiring the equipment required Bukele to secure approval from the Legislative Assembly to obtain a US$109 million loan from the Central American Bank for Economic Integration, but Bukele lacked control of the Legislative Assembly as it was controlled by the opposition.

Bukele's government entered negotiations with ARENA and the FMLN, the Legislative Assembly's two largest political parties, to secure approval for the loan. Both parties, however, refused to approve the loan citing an apparent lack of transparency from Bukele's government on how the money would be allocated. Bukele, angered by their refusal, referred to the legislators as "good for nothings" and accused some of being involved with the country's gangs.

On 6 February 2020, Bukele invoked article 167 of the constitution that convoked an extraordinary session of the Legislative Assembly to be held on 9 February. The purpose of the session was to approve the loan for the Territorial Control Plan. On 7 February, the Legislative Assembly met and voted with a 64-vote majority (out of 84 legislators) to reject Bukele's invoking of article 167, citing that the invoking was potentially unconstitutional as approving the loan was not a constitutional emergency. Bukele responded to the legislature's rejected on Twitter, writing that he would invoke article 87 that called on Salvadorans to use their "right to insurrection" against the Legislative Assembly for causing constitutional disorder. ARENA responded to Bukele's remarks by calling on him to "respect the separation of powers" (se respete la independencia de poderes").

== Incursion in the legislature ==
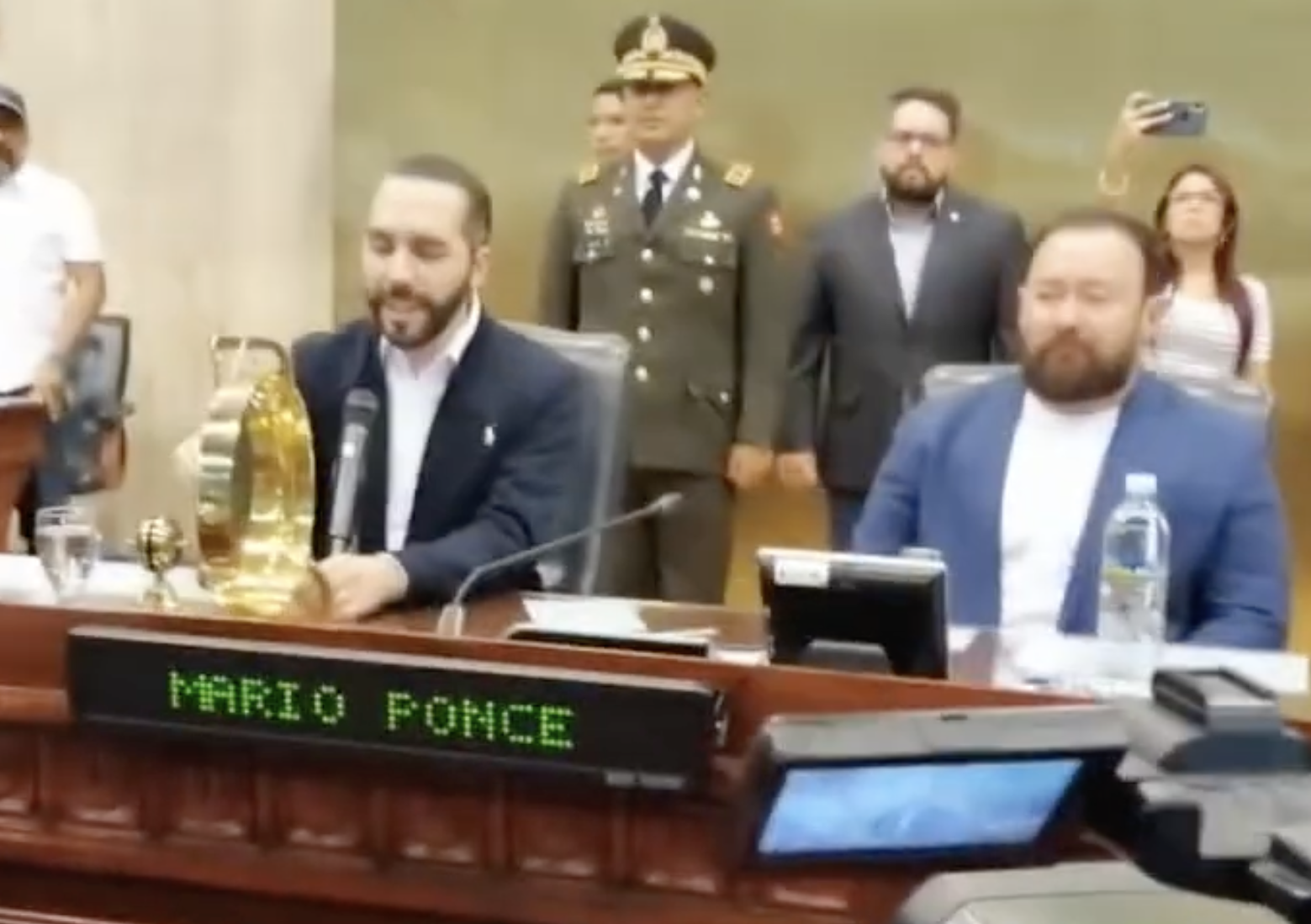
Nayib Bukele (sitting in Mario Ponce's seat) and Guillermo Gallegos during 9F

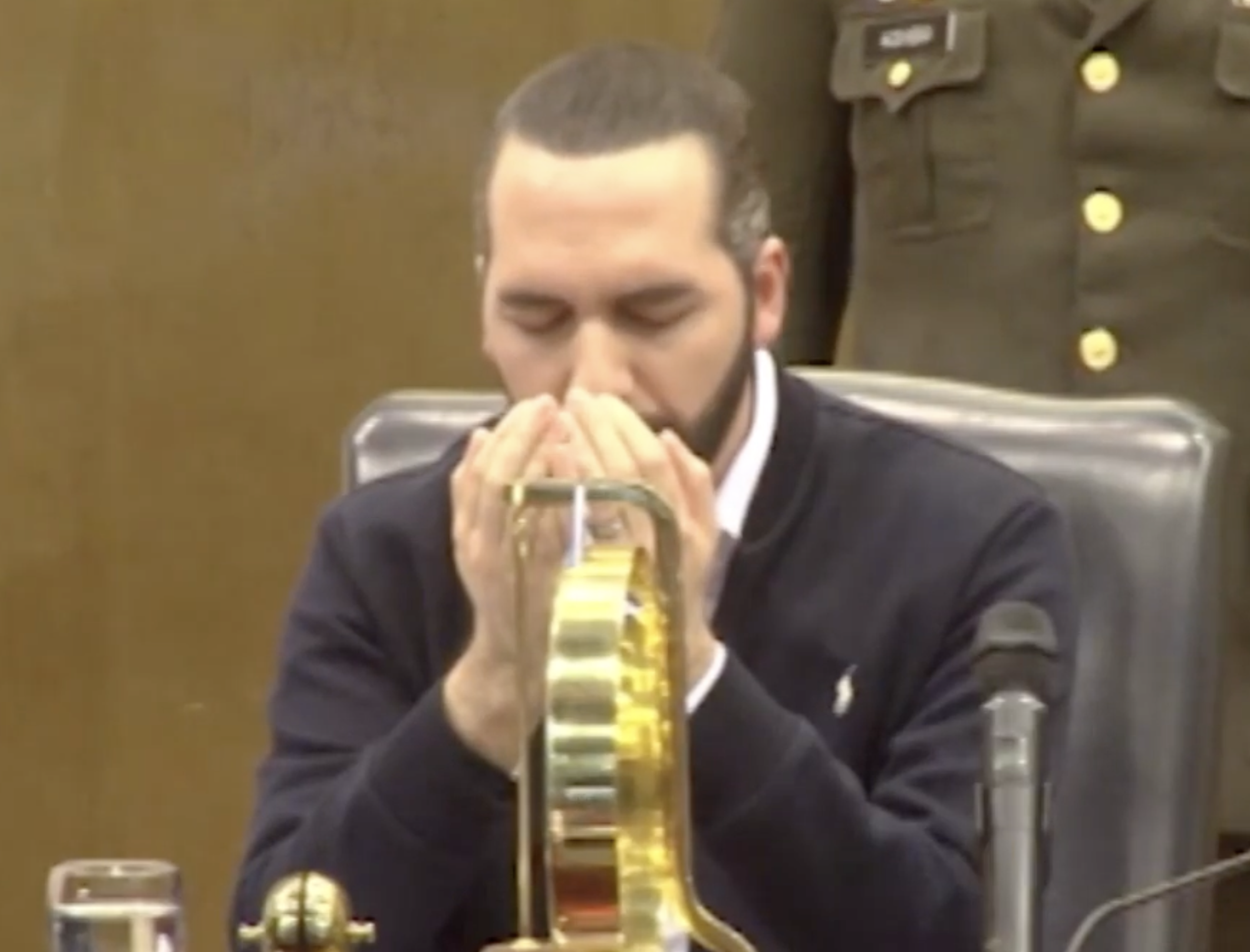
Nayib Bukele praying during the incursion in the Legislative Assembly

The day before the 9 February extraordinary session, Bukele met with more than 50 high-ranking military officials and discussed sending soldiers into the Legislative Assembly during the extraordinary session. Defense minister Rear Admiral René Merino Monroy told the Armed Forces of El Salvador (FAES) to "obey the president" ("obedecer al presidente"). Furthermore, Bukele sent soldiers to the homes of some legislators to order them to attend the extraordinary session.

When the extraordinary session began at 3 p.m. on 9 February, less than half (Note: The total number of legislators present in the Blue Chamber on 9 February 2020 is uncertain. Sources have mentioned that 22, 28, or 31 legislators were present. According to the North American Congress on Latin America's Hilary Goodfriend, all parties except the FMLN had at least one legislator attend the extraordinary session.) of the Legislative Assembly's 84 members were present preventing quorum from being reached. At 3:50 p.m. PNC director Mauricio Arriaza Chicas made a phone call and remarked: "They're going to open the door to the Assembly's security committee room. It won't be the police or the FAES. But once they open it, the president has given us several instructions." (Note: Spanish: Van a abrir la puerta del salón de la comisión de seguridad de la Asamblea. No va a ser la Policía ni la FAES. Pero una vez la abran, el presidente nos ha dado varias instrucciones.") According to PCN legislator Reynaldo Cardoza, Arriaza Chicas demanded access to the Blue Chamber (meeting room) or he would "knock down the doors" ("tumbar las puertas"). At 4:25 p.m., uniformed soldiers entered the Blue Chamber where the extraordinary session was supposed to occur; GANA legislator Guillermo Gallegos authoritzed their entry. Bukele himself arrived at 4:40 p.m. and sat in Ponce's vacant chair, who was by then the president of the Legislative Assembly. Bukele remarked that "it's clear who's in control of the situation and we're going to put the decision in the hands of God". There, Bukele prayed for three minutes; he informed the legislators and soldiers that he God told him to be patient. Bukele and the soldiers then departed from the Blue Chamber.

When Bukele left, he addressed a crowd of his supporters. According to Bukele, the crowd numbered 50,000, while independent sources estimate the crowd size to have been 5,000. He told them that God had told him to be patient. He further stated that he would give the Legislative Assembly one week to approve the loan or that he would invoke article 167 to convene them again. He also mentioned that he was willing to remove legislators from the Legislative Assembly if necessary, referring to them as "shameless" and "criminals". Bukele then left at 5:20 p.m. Bukele's supporters chanted "insurrection, insurrection!"

== Aftermath ==
=== Legal repercussions ===
On 10 February, the Supreme Court of Justice issued a ruling that suspended any acts that were issued during the extraordinary session. The court also ordered Bukele to not use the military in unconstitutional ways that "endanger the republican, democratic and representative system of government". On 12 February, Bukele stated that he disagreed with the ruling but that he would respect it. In October 2020, the Supreme Court of Justice issued another ruling that formally deemed the extraordinary session to have been unconstitutional and further warned the PNC and the army that their incursion was criminal.

On 13 February, FMLN legislator Dina Argueta accused Arriaza Chicas of ordering police officers to harass her family and other FMLN members in the days prior to 9 February. She stated that she was compiling evidence and planned to file a report with the Office of the Attorney General (FGR). Arriaza Chicas denied Argueta accusation, but he issued a public apology for the incursion and stated that there was "a lack of coordination" with the army's general staff. The FMLN also called for PNC and FAES leaders to resign in response to the incursion.

=== Legislative investigation ===
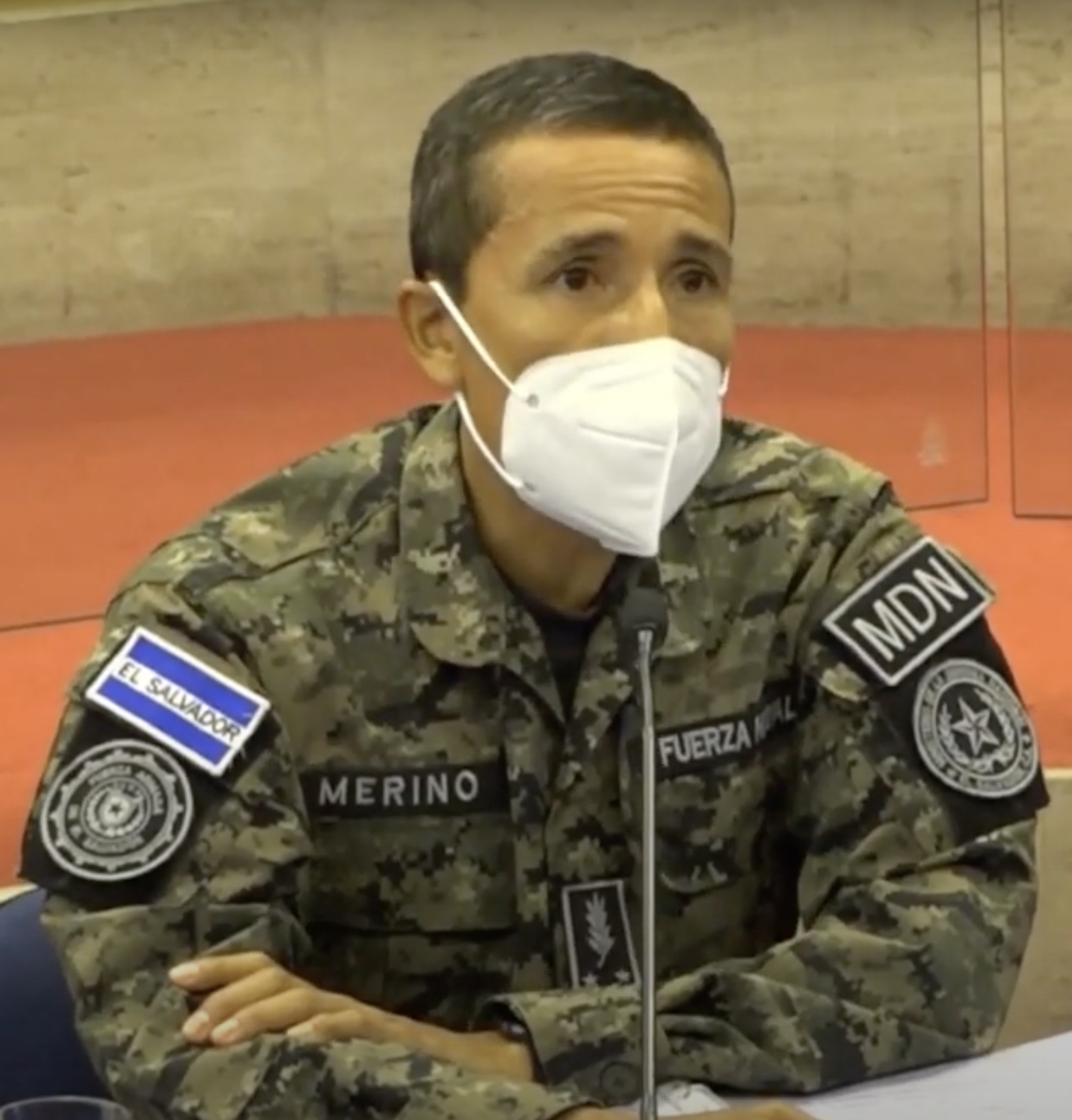
Defense minister René Merino Monroy testifying regarding the events of 9 February

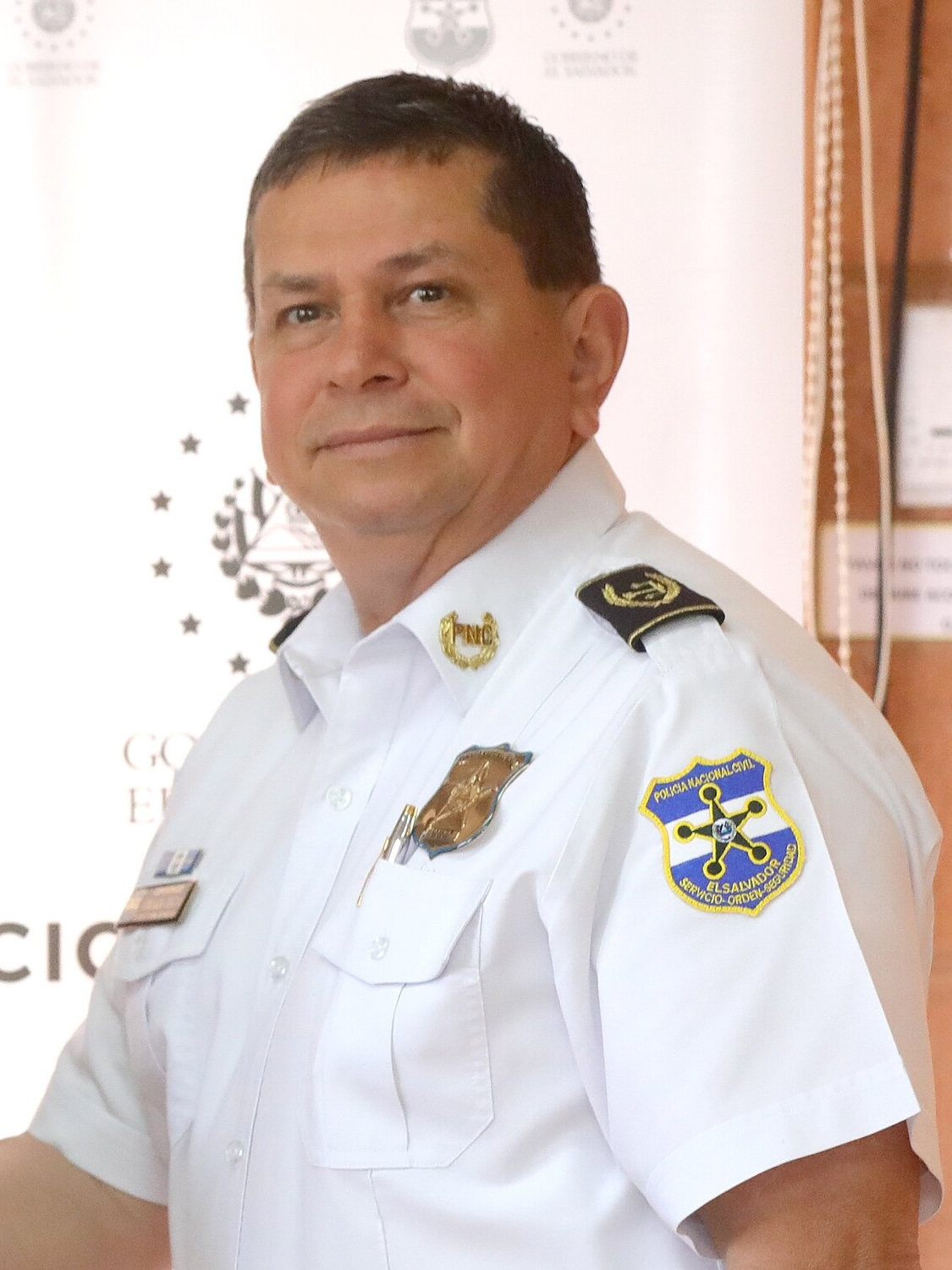
PNC director Mauricio Arriaza Chicas, whom the 9F Commission demanded be removed from office for his role during the incursion

The day after 9F, Ponce announced that he would establish a special legislative commission to investigate the incident. On 14 February, FMLN legislators demanded to hold an inquiry with Merino Monroy and justice minister Rogelio Rivas to probe into the events surrounding the incursion. On 27 February, the Legislative Assembly formally denounced the entry of soldiers into the Blue Chamber and established a special commission, chaired by ARENA legislator Alberto Romero, to investigate who was responsible for the incident. The special commission was suspended soon after due to the COVID-19 pandemic, but it resumed its investigation in July 2020.

On 20 August, at an interpellation before the Legislative Assembly, Attorney General Raúl Melara stated that, while the military's incursion into the Legislative Assembly was "excessive", he believed that the events that transpired did not constitute a crime. In an interview with Channel 12 later that day, Melara remarked that the FGR had done its due diligence since 9 February and that it had found no evidence to label the incursion as a crime.

On 21 August, the Legislative Assembly summoned Merino Monroy to testify regarding the events of 9 February. During the 10-hour interpellation, Merino Monroy stated that he was at the Legislative Assembly that day to verify that Bukele had sufficient security as mandated by law. He also stated that the soldiers were members of the Presidential Battalion tasked with ensuring that everything was in order. PDC legislator Rodolfo Parker asserted that this was untrue as the soldiers were members of elite units rather than the Presidential Battalion. When asked who ordered the soldiers into the Legislative Assembly, Merino Monroy stated that the incursion was not a military operation. FMLN legislator Carlos Ruiz expressed dissatisfaction with Merino Monroy's answer, retorting that "it's clear, Mr. Minister, that you don't want to answer [the question]" ("queda claro, señor ministro, que usted no quiere responder").

The special commission published its final report on 15 December. It demanded that Bukele remove Arriaza Chicas as PNC director due to his role in 9F, and it further demanded that Merino Monroy, Colonel Manuel Acevedo (Chief of the Presidential General Staff), and Colonel Carlos Tejada (Chief of the Joint General Staff) resign from their commissions; none of them were removed or resigned. Some lawyers argued that the Legislative Assembly's demand that Arriaza Chicas be removed amounted to the legislature effectively removing him from office. They argue that Arriaza Chicas was legally no longer the PNC director citing article 131 of the constitution that such a demand for removal is effective immediately if it is made for a security official for severe human rights violations. Despite the Legislative Assembly's demand and the lawyers' interpretation of the constitution, Arriaza Chicas continued to serve as PNC director until his death in a helicopter crash on 8 September 2024.

=== Loan approval ===
After the incursion, ARENA and the FMLN announced that they needed more time to evaluate approving the loan. On 18 February, as the Legislative Assembly continued to not act on approving the loan, Bukele deployed 1,400 soldiers across the country to implement the Territorial Control Plan. Bukele remarked that "we cannot use the lack of funding as an excuse; we have to go out with or without resources" ("No podemos poner de excusa que no nos dan fondos. Tenemos que salir y trabajar con o sin recursos."). He added that the legislators would have to answer to voters at the February 2021 legislative election if they refused to approve the loan.

== Reactions ==
=== Political reactions ===
The day after the incursion into the Legislative Assembly, Ponce stated that "we cannot respond to the executive branch with a gun to our head" and referred to the events as "an attempted coup". Ponce also discarded his seat and the chamber's gong, considering them to have been usurped by Bukele. Independent legislator Leonardo Bonilla, who attended the extraordinary session, remarked, "So they're going to make us vote with a rifle to the head? [...] This isn't the way a democracy works." Shortly after the incursion, Gallegos told Arriaza Chicas that he did not have a problem with the soldiers' presence inside the Blue Chamber. After Merino Monroy testified to the Legislative Assembly, CD legislator Juan José Martel remarked that Merino Monroy should be proud of the incursion into the Blue Chamber.

"If I was a dictator, I would have taken control of the entire government last night." (Note: Spanish: "Si fuera un dictador hubiera tomado el control de todo el Gobierno anoche.")

— Nayib Bukele, 10 February 2020

ARENA and the FMLN both described Bukele's actions as dictatorial and as a self-coup. ARENA legislator Carlos Reyes called on the Organization of American States to intervene and resolve the situation. ARENA legislator Felissa Cristales, who attended the extraordinary session but walked out in protest of the soldiers' entry, remarked that "No Salvadoran can be in favor of this [...] El Salvador is a country where democracy has cost blood". ARENA president Gustavo López Davidson tweeted that ARENA believed in democracy and that "Democracy yes, self-coup no!!" ("Democracia sí, autogolpe no!!"). FMLN secretary-general Óscar Ortiz demanded the Bukele "end his threats, which belong to a dictatorship" ("frenar sus amenazas, propias de una dictadura").

On 15 February, Bukele wrote an op-ed for the Miami Herald defending his actions. He wrote:

My administration was deeply concerned about a popular uprising of frustrated Salvadorans mobilized against the National Assembly. This is why we asked the military to be present, should violence erupt as tens of thousands of Salvadorans gathered outside the National Assembly calling for the removal of its members.

=== Civilian reactions ===
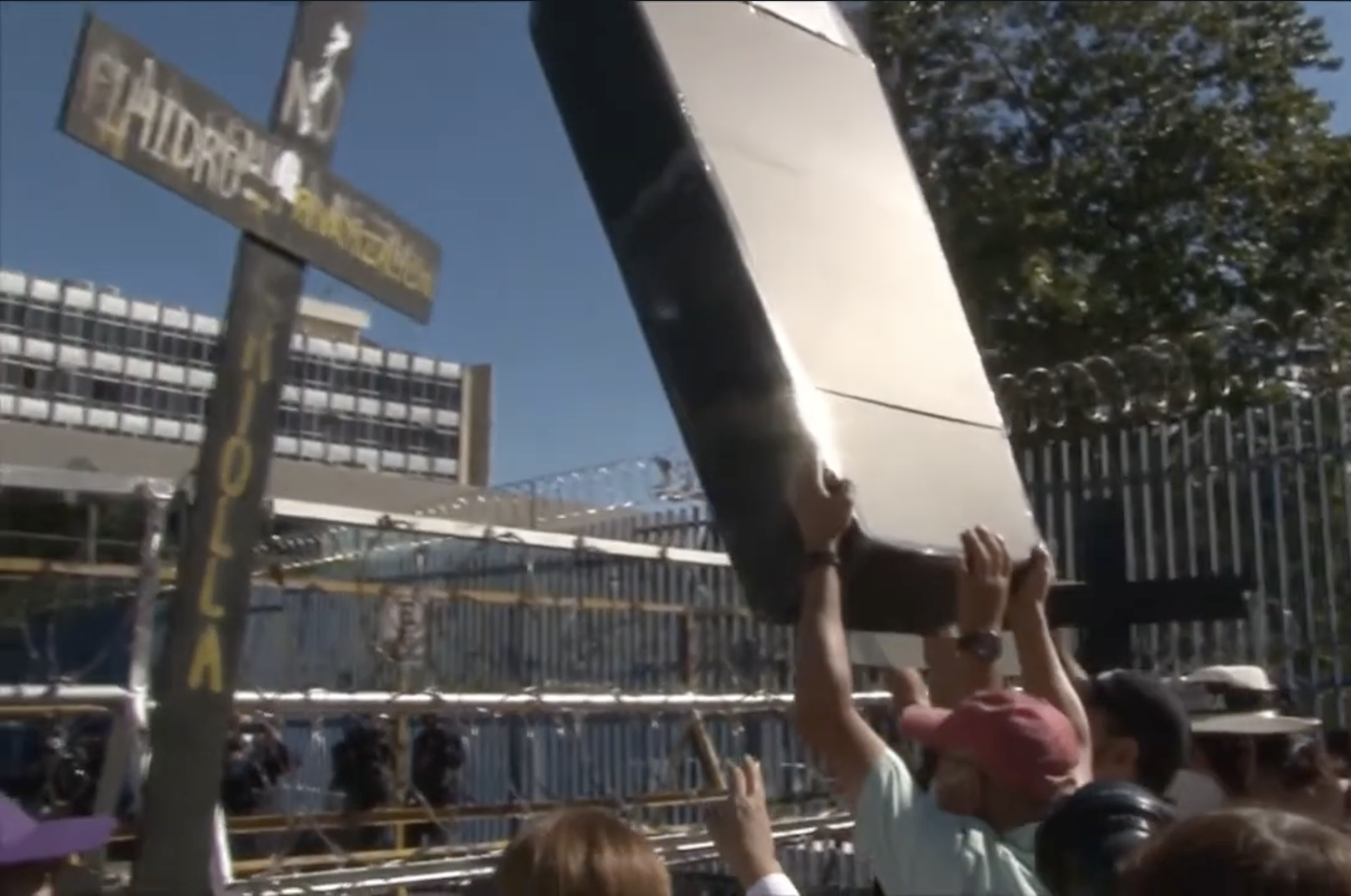
Salvadorans protesting 9F in front of the Legislative Assembly on 9 February 2022, the incident's 2nd anniversary

On 10 February, Salvadoran activists from the University of El Salvador held a small protest against Bukele's actions. Other Salvadorans expressed their support for Bukele on social media. Former legislator Walter Araujo invoked article 87 and called for Salvadorans to launch an insurrection against the Legislative Assembly on 16 February. That day, Araujo led a 30-minute protest demonstration in front of the Legislative Assembly. According to an opinion poll conducted by the Francisco Gavidia University in late-February 2020, 78.5 percent of Salvadorans partially or completely approved of Bukele's actions on 9 February while 21.4 percent disapproved.

The Association of Journalists of El Salvador denounced "a series of instances of digital harassment against journalists covering the events [of 9 February]" ("una serie de expresiones de acoso digital hacia periodistas que daban cobertura"). Inter-American Commission on Human Rights special rapporteur for freedom and expression Edison Lanza called on the Salvadoran government to not censor the press or its ability to report on the political crisis. On 24 February, Monsignor José Luis Escobar Alas, the archbishop of San Salvador, called on Salvadorans to "lower the tone of mutual attacks" ("bajen el tono de ataques mutuos").

=== Foreign reactions ===
A spokesperson for the United States Department of State stated that Bukele's actions were "unacceptable" and "violates the separation of powers of the democratic institutions of that country". The spokesperson mentioned that the department had "communicated that message to the Salvadoran government". Ronald D. Johnson, the US ambassador to El Salvador, criticized the presence of soldiers in the Legislative Assembly but echoed Bukele's call for patience. Democratic congressman Eliot Engel, the chair of the United States House Committee on Foreign Affairs, denounced the events of 9F, and the United States Senate Committee on Foreign Relations issued a bipartisan statement expressing that it was "deeply concerned" about the deployment of soldiers in the Blue Chamber. Democratic congressman Jimmy Panetta issued a Congressional Progressive Caucus statement that condemned the incursion as a "blatant act of political intimidation".

The Costa Rican foreign affairs ministry called for democratic institutions to be respected. Guatemalan president Alejandro Giammattei called for strengthening democracy in El Salvador and affirmed his support for Bukele and the Territorial Control Plan. OAS secretary-general Luis Almagro spoke with Salvadoran foreign minister Alexandra Hill Tinoco during the extraordinary session; he tweeted that Hill Tinoco expressed respect for El Salvador's political institutions. A delegation of the European Union in El Salvador stated that it was "grave[ly] concerned" at the situation of the rule of law in El Salvador. Birgit Gerstenberg, the United Nations' resident coordinator in El Salvador, stated that the UN trusted that "the spirit of dialogue will always prevail" ("el espíritu de dialogo prevalezca siempre").

Human Rights Watch described the incursion as a "blatant attempt to undermine the rule of law" and called on the members of the OAS to "not normalize President Bukele's brazen attacks on democratic institutions". Erika Guevara Rosas, Amnesty International's director for the Americas, condemned the incursion and raised concerns of what it could mean for the future of human rights in El Salvador. The Washington Office on Latin America (WOLA) called on the international community to "strongly condemn the involvement of the military in a political dispute".

== Legacy ==
Opposition politicians have described the 2020 political crisis as an attempted coup or a self-coup. Political scientists have cited the incident as an instance of democratic backsliding that endangered the future of Salvadoran democracy. Los Angeles Times writers Patrick J. McDonnell and Alexander Renderos described the incident as "the gravest violation to date of the peace accords [that ended the civil war], which called for a nonpolitical military and the separation of powers among the branches of government".

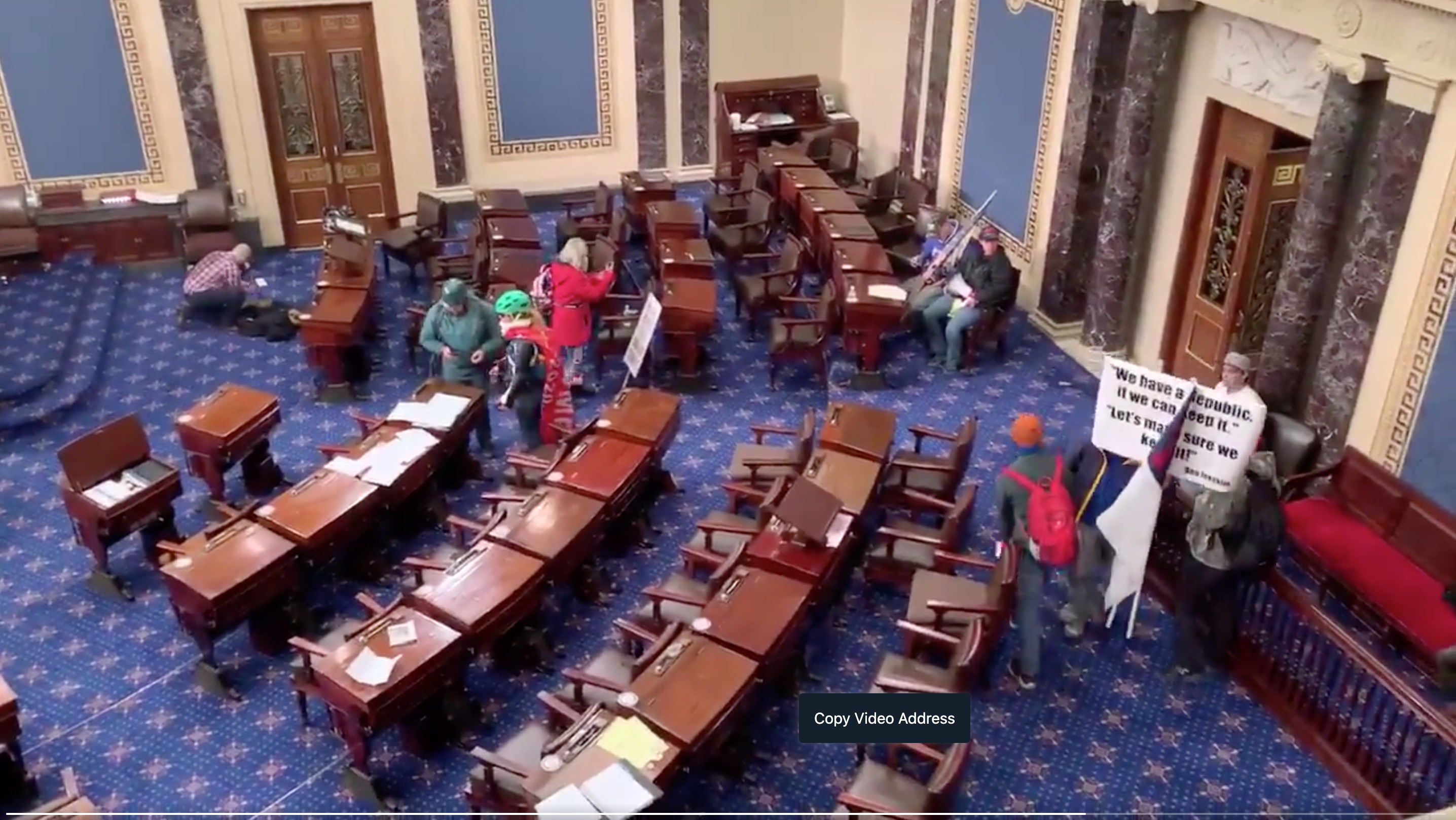
The Legislative Assembly compared the events of 9F to the January 2021 storming of the United States Capitol.

Following the storming of the United States Capitol in January 2021, Parker, ARENA legislator René Portillo Cuadra, and FMLN legislator Nidia Díaz compared it to the events of 9 February. Converely, Gallegos stated that there was no comparison between the two events. On 7 January, the Legislative Assembly approved a pronouncement that formally compared the incursion into the Legislative Assembly to the United States Capitol attack. Part of the pronouncement declared that Bukele's "violent actions" ("acciones violentas") in sending soldiers into the legislature were "in opposition to democratic principles and respect for the separation of powers" ("en contraposición de los principios democráticos y respeto a la separación de poderes").

In a March 2021 interview with Univision reporter Jorge Ramos, Vice President Félix Ulloa remarked that entry of soldiers into the legislature was a "mistake" and that it was not necessary.

== See also ==
- 1993–1995 Salvadoran legislature attacks
- 2021 Salvadoran political crisis
- List of attacks on legislatures
