= Walter Araujo =

Salvadoran politician

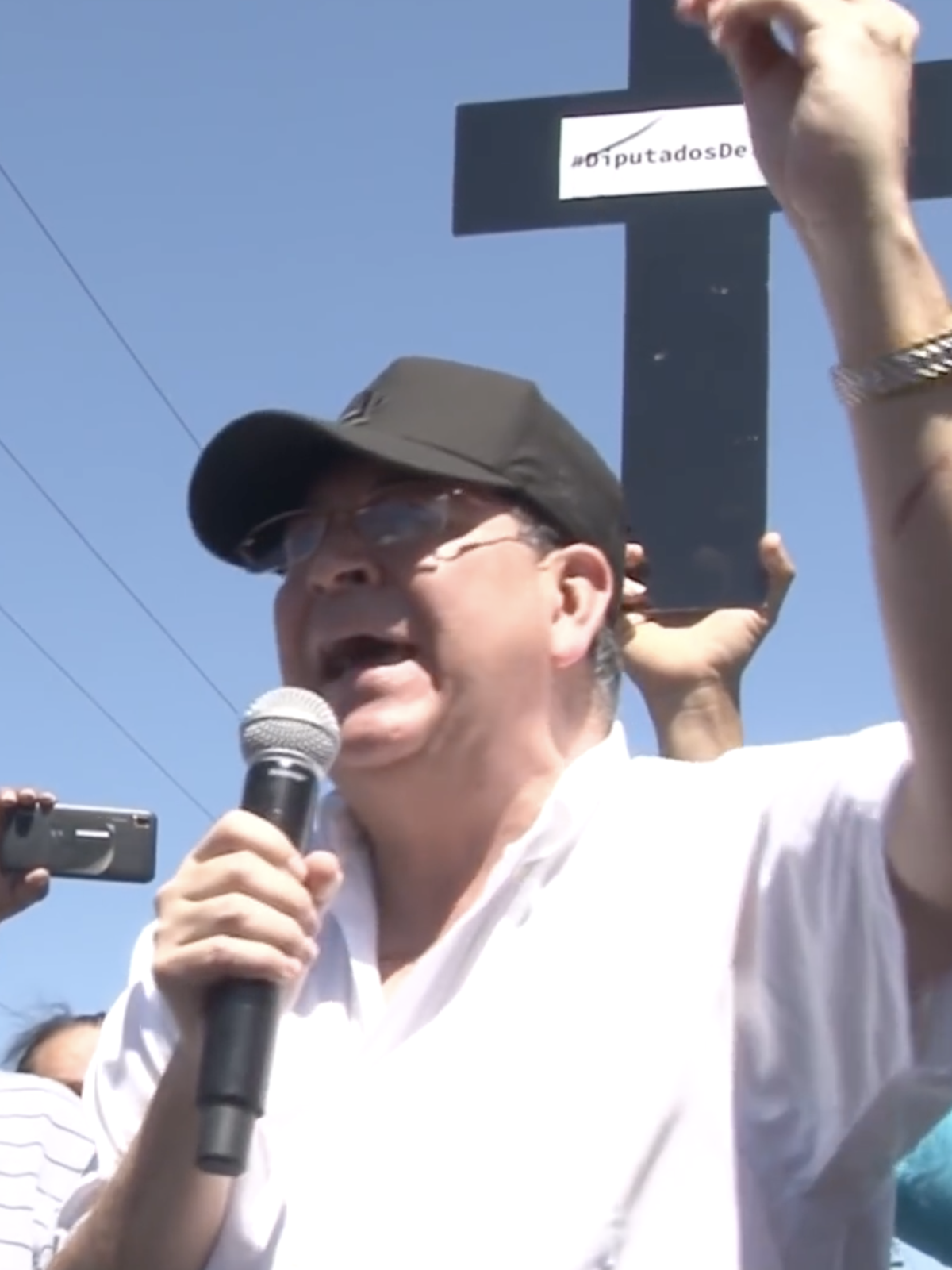
- Araujo in 2020

173rd President of the Legislative Assembly of El Salvador
- In office 1 May 2001 – 1 May 2002
- Preceded by: Ciro Cruz Zepeda
- Succeeded by: Ciro Cruz Zepeda

Deputy of the Legislative Assembly of El Salvador
- In office 1 May 1994 – 1 May 2003

Magistrate of the Supreme Electoral Court of El Salvador
- In office 2009–2014

Personal details
- Born: Walter René Araujo Morales; 1964 or 1965 (age 60–61) El Salvador
- Party: Nuevas Ideas
- Other political affiliations: Grand Alliance for National Unity; Nationalist Republican Alliance (until 2013)
- Occupation: Politician, political commentator

Walter René Araujo Morales (born 1964 or 1965) is a Salvadoran politician and political commentator who served as the president of the Legislative Assembly of El Salvador from 2001 to 2002. He was a deputy of the Legislative Assembly from 1994 to 2003. He also served as a magistrate of the Supreme Electoral Court (TSE) from 2009 to 2014. Araujo is an ally of Salvadoran president Nayib Bukele.

== Biography ==
Walter René Araujo Morales was born in 1964 or 1965. Araujo was a deputy of the Legislative Assembly of El Salvador as a member of the Nationalist Republican Alliance (ARENA) from 1994 to 2003. He was the legislature's vice president during the 2000–2003 term. At some point, Araujo served as the president of the National Executive Council (COENA), ARENA's leadership board.

Araujo served as a magistrate of the Supreme Electoral Court (TSE) from 2009 to 2014. According to La Prensa Gráfica's Edwin Segura, Araujo conducted 58 trips as a TSE magistrate for which the court paid US$234,000. Segura argued that Araujo's trips were among the most expensive out of any of the TSE's magistrates, and the Government Ethics Tribunal investigated him and his wife for allegedly taking pleasure trips with state funds.

Araujo left ARENA on 26 September 2013 following disagreements with the party's leadership and its 2014 presidential candidate, Norman Quijano. He was the Grand Alliance for National Unity's (GANA) candidate for mayor of San Salvador during the 2015 municipal elections. He finished in third place with 1,389 votes behind ARENA's Edwin Zamora and the Farabundo Martí National Liberation Front's (FMLN) Nayib Bukele. Araujo was an election observer for the 2017 Venezuelan Constituent Assembly election, and he described the Venezuelan electoral system as one of the best in the world.

In 2018, Araujo called for the TSE to suspend ARENA's registration as a political party after former president Antonio Saca admitted that he transferred "several million dollars" ("varios millones de dólares") to ARENA to help finance political campaigns. Araujo argued that this violated article 47 of the Law of Political Parties

=== Presidency of Nayib Bukele ===
Since 2017, Araujo has been one of Bukele's political allies. Araujo was an early member of Nuevas Ideas and led Nuevas Ideas USA. Araujo supported the Bukele's presidential candidacy during the 2019 presidential election. In December 2018, he led a protest in front of the TSE's headquarters accusing the body of electoral fraud against Bukele by changing the design of the ballot. After Bukele's victory, Araujo stated that he would not join Bukele's cabinet and that he would instead focus on running his YouTube channel. He did add that he did not rule out ever joining Bukele's cabinet in the event that Bukele asked him to join.

After Bukele sent 40 soldiers into the Legislative Assembly on 9 February 2020 to force deputies to approve a loan for his Territorial Control Plan, Araujo called for Salvadorans to launch an insurrection against the Legislative Assembly on 16 February to support Bukele, invoking article 87 of the constitution of El Salvador. A Salvadoran citizen filed a complaint with the Office of the Attorney General (FGR) asking the law enforcement agency to arrest Araujo for allegedly engaging in a conspiracy to commit sedition through his comments. Araujo dismissed the lawsuit as "ridiculous" and challenged Attorney General Raúl Melara to arrest him. Araujo led a protest in front of the Legislative Assembly on 16 February demanding that it approve the loan. On 1 July 2021, the United States Department of State listed Araujo on Section 353 "Corrupt and Undemocratic Actors Report" for calling for an insurrection against the Legislative Assembly.

Araujo was a legislative candidate from the San Salvador Department for Nuevas Ideas in the 2021 legislative election. In July 2020, Bertha María Deleón filed a criminal complaint with the FGR against Araujo for allegedly expressing violent behavior towards women on social media. Deleón filed a lawsuit against Araujo in January 2021 alleging that he violated article 126 of the constitution for supposedly showing a "pattern of aggressive and violent behavior toward women in public spaces and on social media" ("patrón de conducta agresiva y violenta contra las mujeres es espacios públicos y redes sociales"). One month before the election, the Constitutional Chamber of the Supreme Court of Justice ruled that he could not seek public office while the lawsuit was pending and Nuevas Ideas had to replace Araujo's candidacy. A preliminary hearing into the lawsuit was suspended in August 2021.

In January 2024, retired colonel and ARENA deputy Óscar Armando Anaya de Paz filed a lawsuit against Araujo accusing him of defamation for comments that Araujo made about Anaya on social media. The Third Sentencing Court of San Salvador dismissed the lawsuit a few weeks later.

Political offices
Preceded by Ciro Cruz Zepeda	President of the Legislative Assembly of El Salvador; 2001–2002	Succeeded by Ciro Cruz Zepeda
