= Salvadoran protests =

Salvadoran protests may refer to:

- 2020 Salvadoran protests
- 2023 Salvadoran protests
