= Right to insurrection (El Salvador) =

Constitutional right in El Salvador

Articles 87 and 88 of the constitution of El Salvador grant the Salvadoran people the "right to insurrection" ("derecho a la insurrección")—the right to overthrow members of their government—to restore constitutional order in the event of a coup d'état, government human rights violations, or attempts to enable presidential re-election. Although the right to insurrection is constitutionally protected, there are limitations on when it can be invoked and on the scope of its power to depose officials, and it may not be used to abrogate or amend the constitution.

The right to insurrection has been enshrined in every Salvadoran constitution since 1886, with the exception of the 1939 constitution; the right has been present in the constitutions of 1886, 1945, 1950, 1962, and 1983. The right to insurrection was invoked by the Armed Forces of El Salvador during the 1894, 1931, and 1979 coups. President Nayib Bukele threatened to invoke the right to insurrection during the country's 2020 political crisis, and his opponents called for the right to be invoked following Bukele's presidential re-election in 2024. According to a 2020 poll by LPG Datos, there is little public awareness in El Salvador of the right to insurrection.

== Constitutional text ==
The constitution of El Salvador, in force since 1983, enshrines the right to insurrection as a constitutional right of the Salvadoran people in articles 87 and 88. The articles read:

Article 87

The people's right to insurrection is recognized, for the sole objective of restoring the constitutional order disrupted by violations of the rules concerning the established form of government or political system, or for grave violations of the rights enshrined in this Constitution.

The exercise of this right shall not result in the abrogation or amendment of this Constitution and shall be limited to removing, as necessary, the offending officials, replacing them in a temporary manner until they are substituted in a manner established by this Constitution.

The powers and responsibilities that correspond to the fundamental bodies established by the Constitution may not, under any circumstances, be exercised by the same person or by a single institution. (Note: Spanish: "Se reconoce el derecho del pueblo a la insurrección, para el solo objeto de restablecer el orden constitucional alterado por la transgresión de las normas relativas a la forma de gobierno o al sistema político establecidos, o por graves violaciones a los derechos consagrados en esta Constitución. El ejercicio de este derecho no producirá la abrogación ni la reforma de esta Constitución y se limitará a separar en cuanto sea necesario a los funcionarios transgresores, reemplazándolos de manera transitoria hasta que sean sustituidos en la forma establecida por esta Constitución. Las atribuciones y competencias que corresponden a los órganos fundamentales establecidos por esta Constitución, no podrán ser ejercidas en ningún caso por una misma persona o por una sola institución.")

Article 88

The rotation in the exercise of the Presidency of the Republic is indispensable for the established form of government and political system. The violation of this norm compels the continuation of insurrection. (Note: Spanish: "La alternabilidad en el ejercicio de la Presidencia de la República es indispensable para la forma de gobierno y sistema político establecidos. La violación de esta norma obliga el mantenimiento de a la insurrección.")

== Purpose and limitations ==
The right to insurrection in the constitution of El Salvador is intended to legitimize the Salvadoran people's overthrow of their government. The primary instance in which the right was historically intended to be invoked was in the event that the government attempts to perpetuate a president's term in office such as through re-election. The constitution long considered re-election to be incompatible with democracy. In 2021, the Supreme Court of Justice of El Salvador ruled that re-election was permissible. Legislator Guillermo Gallegos argued that the court's ruling overrode article 88 that obligated the people to launch an insurrection to prevent presidential re-election. Despite the ruling and later constitutional reforms that allowed indefinite presidential re-election, article 88 remains intact.

In the event of a coup d'état, the constitution mandates that the right to insurrection shall only be invoked if a coup is successful in usurping the government. If a coup is in progress or unsuccessful, the right to insurrection is not valid as the state is the only authority entrusted to resist and punish coup participants. Furthermore, a coup must be proven to have occurred in order for the right to be validly invoked.

The right to insurrection may also be invoked if the government is responsible for the violation of the people's human rights. What constitutes a violation of human rights is undefined, leaving it to the people to define it themselves based on the magnitude or quantity of violations, how long the violations had been occurring, if they were deliberate, their impact, and to the extent the state was involved. In this case, the right to insurrection is only valid if the state's prosecutors, judges, and law enforcement personnel failed to prevent, investigate, and punish said human rights violations.

Paragraph 2 of article 87 prohibits the usage of the right of insurrection to abrogate or amend the constitution. This limitation is based on article 83 that stipulates that only an elected government can amend the constitution. The right to insurrection also only extends to deposing the officials who are responsible for the collapse of constitutional order. Additionally, the right is intended to maintain the continuity of democratic functions and mandates that new officials be elected to replace the deposed ones; the right is not allowed to be used to concentrate power under a single individual or institution.

== History ==
=== Constitutional inclusion ===
In 1885, Divisional General Francisco Menéndez launched a revolution against the government of President Rafael Zaldívar, and later that of Divisional General Fernando Figueroa, in opposition of Zaldívar's adoption of the 1883 constitution that allowed him to seek re-election. In Menéndez's "Plan of Chalchuapa" issued at the start of his revolution, he stressed the need to exercise the right to insurrection to restore order and justice in El Salvador. After Menéndez's victory, his government promulgated the 1886 constitution, which was the first constitution in Salvadoran history to recognize the Salvadoran people's right to insurrection. Articles 36 and 68 of the 1886 constitution gave the Salvadoran people the right to overthrow their government so long as the insurrection did not abrogate the country's laws and replaced the deposed leaders in a manner that abided by the constitution.

The right to insurrection was revoked with the adoption of the 1939 constitution, which enabled Brigadier General Maximiliano Hernández Martínez to seek re-election. The 1886 constitution, and the right to insurrection, were briefly restored following Martínez's overthrow in 1944, and article 36 of the 1945 constitution reaffirmed the right to insurrection. Article 175 of the 1950 constitution maintained the right to insurrection, and article 5 further elaborated that the Salvadoran people were obligated to depose the government if it attempted to enable presidential re-election. The 1962 constitution enshrined the right to insurrection in articles 5 and 7; while the 1983 constitution enshrined the right in articles 87 and 88. In 2020, constitutional lawer Cayetano Núñez proposed eliminating the right to insurrection citing apparent contradictions with articles 85 and 86 and further criticized the inclusion of such a right in the constitution, describing it as "an incitement"; his proposal was not approved.

Inclusion of the right to insurrection in Salvadoran constitutions
Status	Constitutions
Right included ✓	1886, 1945, 1950, 1962, 1983
Right absent ✗	1824, 1841, 1864, 1871, 1872, 1880, 1883, 1885, 1939

=== Invocations ===
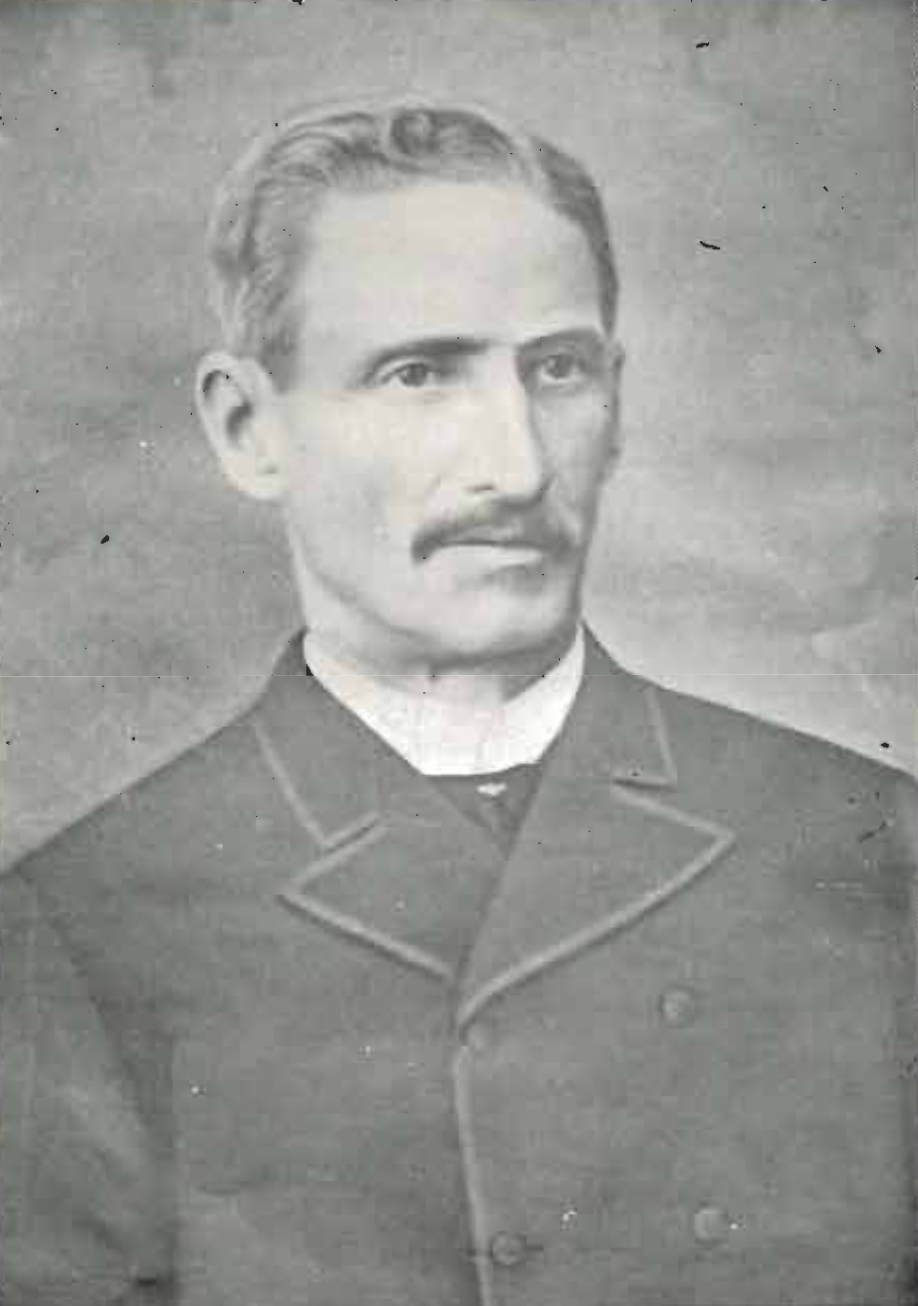
Francisco Menéndez invoked the right to insurrection in his 1885 revolution and enshrined the right in the 1886 constitution.

Menéndez invoked the right to insurrection in his revolution that deposed presidents Zaldívar and Figueroa in 1885 and subsequently enshrined the right in the 1886 constitution. In 1894, General Rafael Antonio Gutiérrez (who fought alongside Menéndez in 1885) invoked the right to insurrection when he launched the Revolution of the 44 against General Carlos Ezeta.

Following the 1931 coup d'état that overthrew Arturo Araujo, United States ambassador Charles B. Curtis described the coup as having been "entirely constitutional" due to the armed forces' invoking the right to insurrection coupled with various unconstitutional actions by Araujo during the coup. Although the right to insurrection was not present in the 1939 constitution, the Due Process Foundation considers the mass protests that led to Martínez's overthrow in 1944 as an exercise of the right against presidential re-election. The Revolutionary Government Junta justified the 1979 coup d'état that overthrew General Carlos Humberto Romero by invoking the right to insurrection on the basis that Romero's government, among other reasons, violated the people's human rights.

In July 2018, Nayib Bukele threatened to invoke the right to insurrection if the Supreme Electoral Court (TSE) attempted to block his presidential candidacy for the 2019 presidential election. In February 2020, Bukele (who won the 2019 election) threatened to invoke article 87 if legislators of the Legislative Assembly did not attend a session he convoked to approve a loan for his security plan. According to Bukele, they would violate the constitutional order by not attending the session as Bukele had convoked the session using article 167. Bukele again alluded to invoking the article when not enough legislators attended the session to reach quorum. Former legislator Walter Araujo similarly called for an insurrection against the Legislative Assembly to occur one week after the session.

During the 2024 presidential election, in which Bukele successfully ran for re-election, various politicians and constitutional lawyers called for Salvadorans to invoke their right to insurrection. In particular, six civil organizations affirmed the right to insurrection citing article 88; Rubén Zamora, a former legislator and leader of the Citizen Resistance opposition group, called for a "peaceful [insurrection] without arms" ("pacífico y sin armas") against Bukele. After Bukele won re-election, the Salvadoran digital newspaper El Faro wrote that it hoped that "the insurrection to which the Political Constitution obliges will be carried out peacefully" ("que la insurrección a la que obliga la Constitución Política se realice de forma pacífica") to restore constitutional order.

=== Public awareness ===
According to a February 2020 poll conducted by LPG Datos, only 16.6 percent of Salvadorans were aware of their right to insurrection while 81.4 percent were not. Those who were aware of the right had different interpretations of what it meant, with some believing that it implied they were allowed to stage a popular revolution, rebellion, or coup d'état, while others interpreted it as allowing them to stage protests or to hold an election for new legislators. The same poll found that of those who knew of the right to insurrection, a minority were willing to exercise their right.

== See also ==
- List of Salvadoran coup d'états
- Constitution of New Hampshire, Part I, Article 10: Right of revolution
