= Constitution of 1946 =

Constitution of 1946 may refer to:

- Brazilian Constitution of 1946
- French Constitution of 27 October 1946
- 1946 Constitution of El Salvador
- 1946 Yugoslav Constitution
