= 2023 Salvadoran protests =

2023 protests in El Salvador

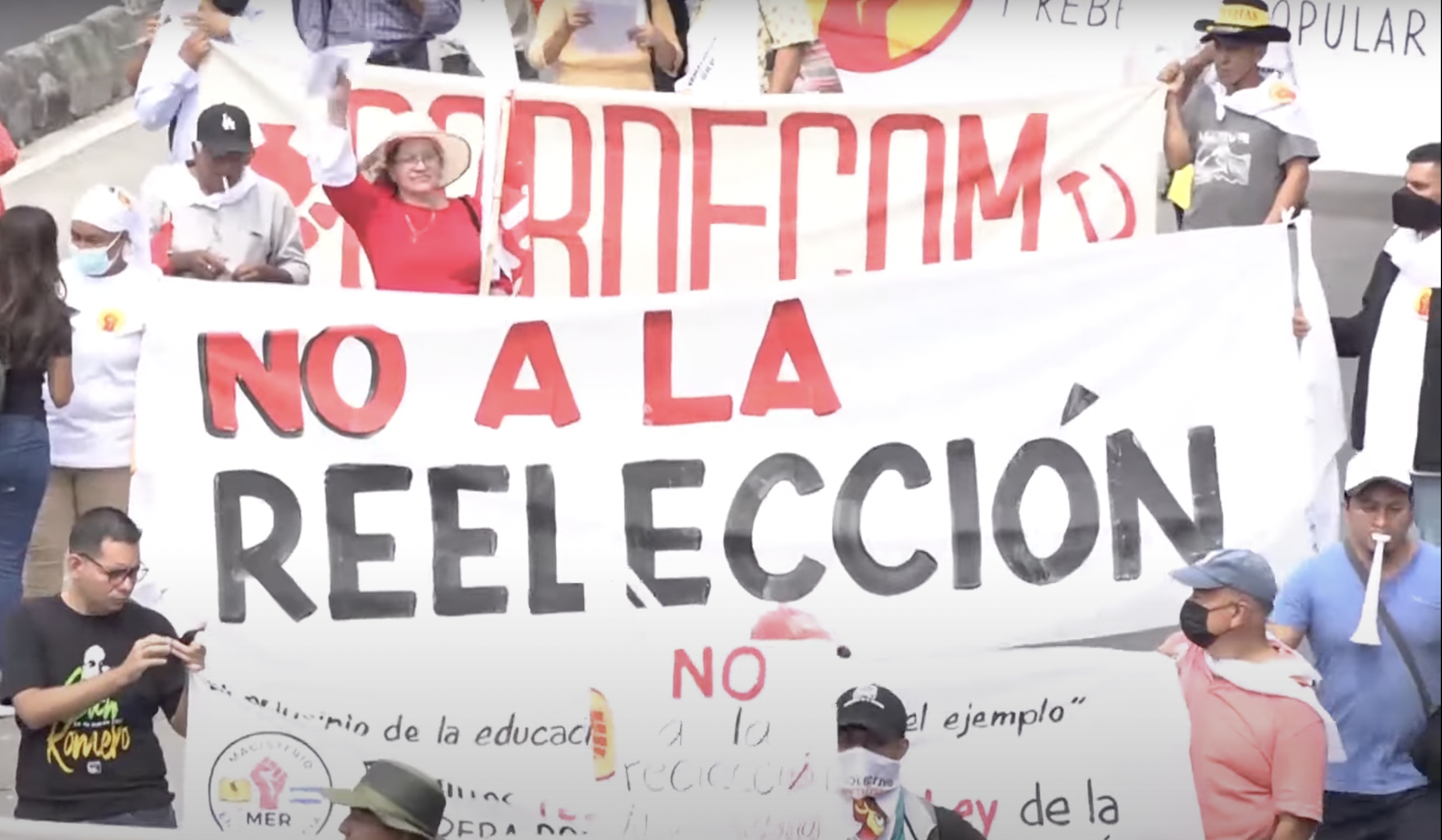
- Protesters holding a banner reading "No to Re-Election" during the 1 May 2023 protest march
- Date: 1 May and 15 September 2023
- Location: San Salvador, El Salvador; 13°41′51.36″N 89°11′27.96″W
- Caused by: Salvadoran gang crackdown; Nayib Bukele's re-election campaign
- Goals: Increase of minimum wage; Release of innocents captured during the gang crackdown; Respect of workers' rights
- Methods: Protest march

Parties
Protesters: ARENA; FMLN; Nuestro Tiempo; Vamos; Other civil organizations	Salvadoran government

Lead figures
Joel Sánchez; Manuel Flores; Luis Parada; Claudia Ortiz	Nayib Bukele; Rolando Castro

Number
"Thousands"	

Protests against re-election occurred in San Salvador, El Salvador on 1 May 2023 and 15 September 2023. In two protest marches, protesters marched from the Cuscatlán Park and Hospital Rosales to Plaza Gerardo Barrios in protest of the Salvadoran gang crackdown and President Nayib Bukele's re-election campaign. Protesters also demanded an increase in minimum wage and that the government respects the rights of syndicates and respects the constitution.

== Organization ==
In mid-April 2023, seven Salvadoran leftist organizations announced that they would hold a protest march in San Salvador on 1 May 2023 in commemoration of the International Workers' Day. The protest's organizers stated that they were protesting against the country's gang crackdown, which had up to that point led to the arrests of over 67,000 people, and against the re-election campaign of President Nayib Bukele; re-election is prohibited by the constitution of El Salvador.

On 20 April 2023, Rodrigo Cerritos, a member of the Farabundo Martí National Liberation Front's (FMLN) national council, confirmed that the FMLN would participate in the 1 May 2023 protest and asked the National Civil Police (PNC) to not block or prevent the protest.

== 1 May protest ==
The protest gathered at 8 a.m. at the Cuscatlán Park. Protesters traveled for three hours to the Gerardo Barrios Plaza. During the march, protesters demanded an increase in minimum wage from US$365 to US$500, the respect of syndical liberties, the respect of the constitution, and opposed the capture of innocent people in the gang crackdown and presidential re-election. In total, 34 organizations and the FMLN, Nuestro Tiempo and Vamos political parties participated in the protest.

Protesters met with Rolando Castro, the minister of labor who was present on behalf of Bukele, at the end of the march. Protesters also burned an effigy of Bukele.

== 15 September protest ==
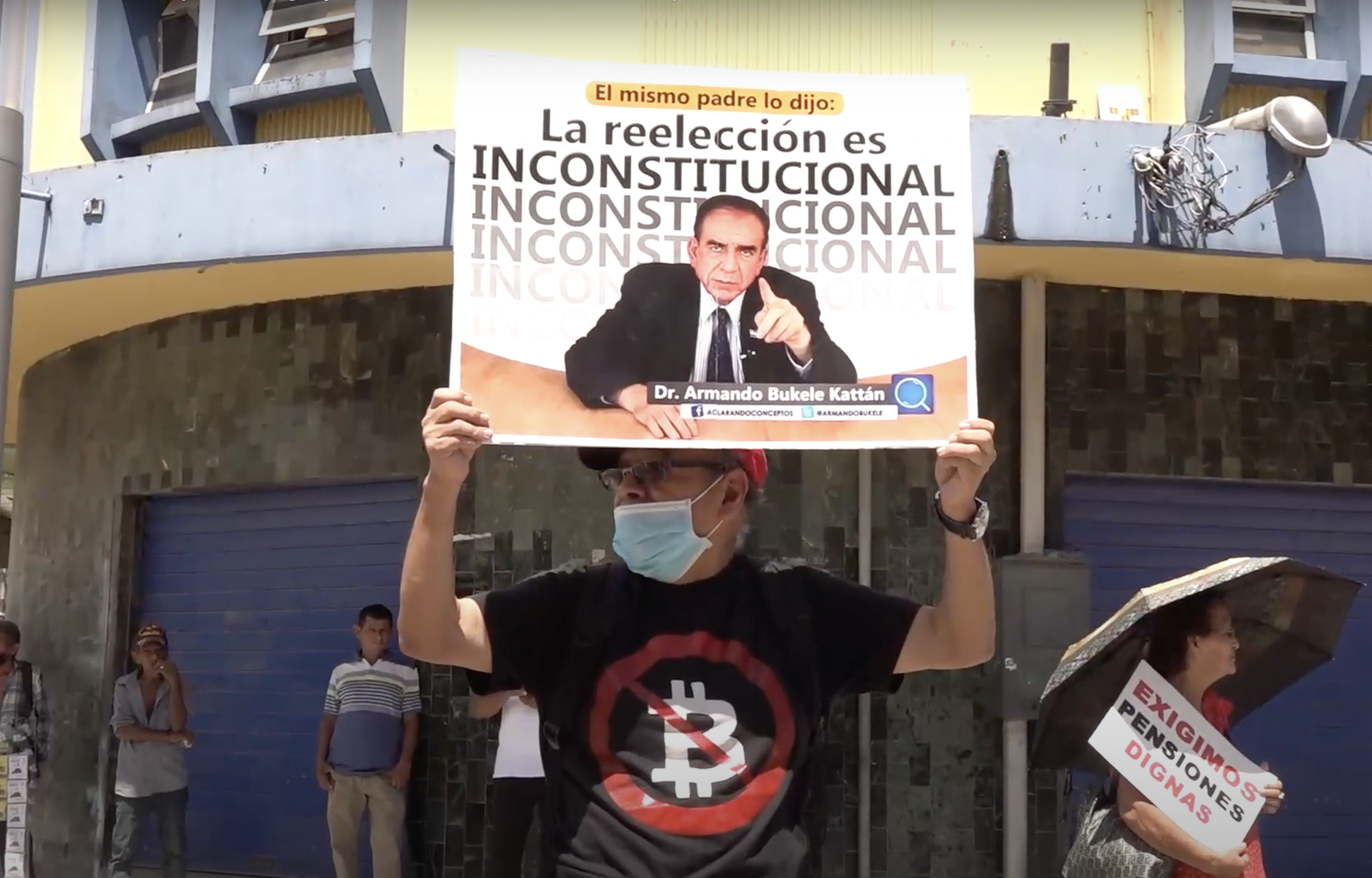
A protester holding a sign containing a quote attributed to Armando Bukele Kattán reading "re-election is unconstitutional" during the 15 September 2023 protest march

On 11 September 2023, various civil organizations announced that they would hold another protest march against re-election on 15 September 2023, the country's independence day. The protest was planned to march from Hospital Rosales to the Gerardo Barrios Plaza. According to Francisco Omar Parada, a spokesman for the Resistance and Popular Rebellion Bloc, the march would protest presidential re-election, the reductions of municipalities and seats on the Legislative Assembly, the "destruction" ("destrucción") of democratic institutions, and the "illegal control" ("control ilegal") exerted by the presidency, the judiciary, the office of the attorney general, and other state institutions. The march's motto was "no to re-election, not one day more" ("no a la reelección, ni un día más"). The presidential candidates of the Nationalist Republican Alliance (ARENA)—Joel Sánchez—, the FMLN—Manuel Flores—and Nuestro Tiempo—Luis Parada—participated in the protest, as did various opposition deputies of the Legislative Assembly.

== See also ==
- 2020 Salvadoran protests
