= Constitutions of El Salvador =

List of the historical constitutions of the country of El Salvador

El Salvador has functioned under fifteen constitutions since it achieved independence from Spain in the early 19th century. The vast majority of these documents were drafted and promulgated without the benefit of broad popular input or electoral mandate. The nature of the country's elite-dominated political system and the personalistic rule of presidents drawn from either the oligarchy or the military accounted for the relatively short life span of most of these documents. Some of them were drafted solely to provide a quasi-legal basis for the extension of a president's term, whereas others were created to legitimize seizures of power on an ex post facto basis.

== Constitutions, 1824 to 1885 ==
The first Salvadoran constitution was produced in 1824. It declared El Salvador independent as a member of the United Provinces of Central America. The dissolution of the United Provinces necessitated the promulgation of a new constitution in 1841 as El Salvador emerged as an independent republic in its own right. The 1841 constitution was a liberal document that established bicameral legislature and set a two-year term for the nation's president with no possibility of reelection. The latter feature contributed directly to the demise of the document in 1864, when President Gerardo Barrios dispensed with it and extended his term by legislative decree.

That same year, Barrios replaced the 1841 constitution with one that, not surprisingly, increased the presidential term to four years and allowed for one reelection. This issue of presidential tenure proved to be a major point of contention for the next two decades. The 1871 constitution, drafted by resurgent liberal forces, restored the two-year term, prohibited immediate reelection, and strengthened the power of the legislative branch. This document too, however, fell victim to individual ambition when President Santiago González replaced it with the constitution of 1872, which restored the four-year term. Similarly, the constitution of 1880 was used to extend the term of President Rafael Zaldivar. The four-year term was retained in the constitution of 1883, but presidential tenure was reduced to three years in the constitution of 1885. The latter document, although it never formally came into force, owing to the overthrow of Zaldivar by Francisco Menendez, was nonetheless an influential piece of work, primarily because it formed the basis for the constitution of 1886, the most durable in Salvadoran history.

== Constitutions, 1886 to 1983 ==
The constitution of 1886 provided for a four-year presidential term with no immediate reelection and established a unicameral legislature. Some limits on presidential power were incorporated, most notably the stricture that all executive decrees or orders had to comply with the stated provisions of the constitution. This constitutional litmus test of executive action was, at least in theory, a significant step toward an institutionalized governmental system and away from the arbitrary imposition of power by self-serving caudillos. The constitution of 1886 showed remarkable staying power by Salvadoran standards, remaining in force in its original form until January 1939. It was reinstated in amended form after World War II. The 1939 constitution that filled the wartime gap was designed by President Maximiliano Hernández Martínez to ensure his uninterrupted rule; it increased the presidential term from four to six years. Martinez's effort to extend his rule still further by inserting a provision for the one-time legislative election of the president was one of several grievances fueling the public unrest that drove him from office in 1944.

The wartime constitution was revised in that same year. Although technically titled the Reforms of 1944, this document is also sometimes referred to as the Constitution of 1944. It was supplanted in 1945 by yet another charter, the constitution of 1945, which endured for only one year. The 1886 constitution, in amended form, was reinstated in 1946. These changes reflected the political uncertainty that prevailed in El Salvador between the termination of Martinez's long tenure as president and the advent of the military-led Revolution of 1948.

The constitution that grew out of the Revolution of 1948, under which Óscar Osorio was elected president, was the constitution of 1950. It retained a unicameral legislature and changed the name from National Assembly to Legislative Assembly. The 1950 charter also restored a six-year presidential term with no immediate reelection and, for the first time, granted Salvadoran women the right to vote.

A Constituent Assembly appointed by the military-civilian junta and headed by Colonel Julio Adalberto Rivera drafted a document that was promulgated as the constitution of 1962 but that was basically quite similar to the 1950 constitution. Relatively long lived by Salvadoran standards, it was not superseded until 1983, by which time the personal and political guarantees of the constitution had been suspended by a state of emergency.

== See also ==
- Constitution of El Salvador for information on the 1983 Constitution, currently in effect
- Right to insurrection (El Salvador)
