= Claudia Ortiz (politician) =

Salvadoran politician and lawyer

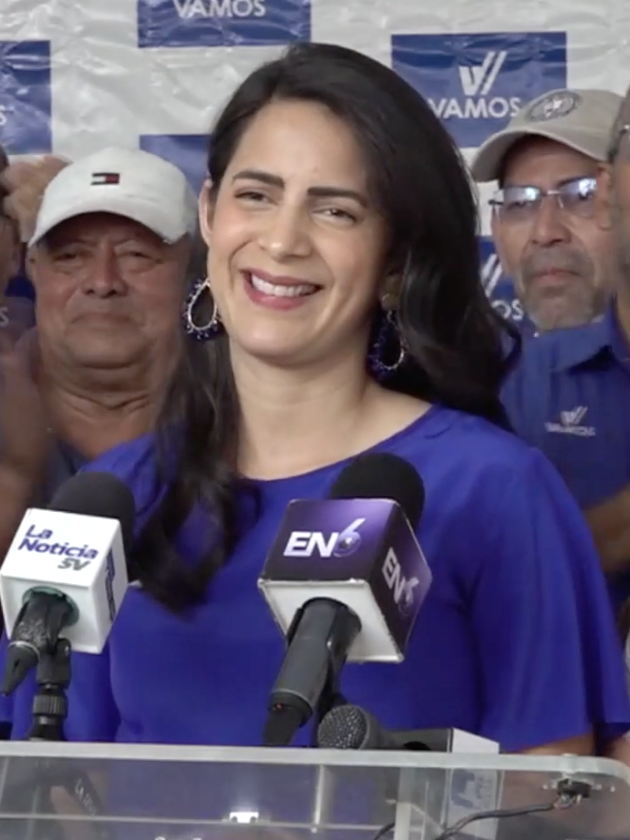
- Ortiz in 2024

Deputy of the Legislative Assembly of El Salvador from San Salvador
- Incumbent
- Assumed office 1 May 2021

Personal details
- Born: Claudia Mercedes Ortiz Menjívar; 10 September 1987 (age 39) San Salvador, El Salvador
- Party: Vamos
- Children: 2
- Education: Central American University
- Occupation: Politician, lawyer
- Website: claudiaortiz.org

Claudia Mercedes Ortiz Menjívar (born 10 September 1987) is a Salvadoran politician and lawyer who has served as a deputy of the Legislative Assembly since 2021. She is the only deputy of the political party Vamos in the legislature, and was elected in the 2021 legislative election from the San Salvador Department. Ortiz is considered a leading opposition figure to the presidency of Nayib Bukele.

== Early life and education ==
Claudia Mercedes Ortiz Menjívar was born on 10 September 1987 in San Salvador, El Salvador. She graduated from the Sacred Heart College and the Central American University as a lawyer.

== Political career ==
In the 2021 legislative election, she was elected to the Legislative Assembly as a deputy of the Vamos political party, the only member of her party elected to the legislature. In October 2022, she opposed a bill which would allow Salvadorans living outside of the country to vote in the 2024 election, claiming that it would lead to voter fraud. She is considered to be one of the leading figures of the political opposition within the legislature against the government of Nayib Bukele and Nuevas Ideas.

Ortiz participated in the 1 May 2023 protests against Bukele's re-election as presidential and the country's gang crackdown. In November 2022, Ortiz announced that she would be seeking re-election to the Legislative Assembly in 2024. She declined to be a presidential candidate in the 2024 presidential election. Ortiz won re-election to the legislature. Ortiz was the leading receiver of votes among opposition figures in the 2024 legislative election. In 2025, Ortiz was the only deputy to vote against a constitutional reform that allowed courts to issue life imprisonment to individuals convicted of murder, rape, or terrorism. She defended her vote by stating that life imprisonment "puts a seal" ("pone un sello") on innocents who are convicted and criticized the reform as an "improvisation".

Ortiz was considered to be a potential presidential candidate ahead of the 2027 presidential election, but Vamos ultimately decided to not run a presidential candidate. Ortiz herself was evaluating whether she would seek re-election or run for Mayor of San Salvador Centro. In July 2026, Ortiz was nominated for re-election. In August, Ortiz told the digital newspaper El Faro that she wants to run for President of El Salvador in a future election.

On 4 September, Vamos initiated procedures to expel Ortiz from the party. The expulsion process suspended her rights as a party member weeks before she intended to participate in internal party elections, seeking to become the party's secretary-general. Ortiz accused the Vamos' leadership of blocking her candidacy in an attempt to keep control of the party.

== Personal life ==
Ortiz is married and has two children. She is trilingual, being able to speak Spanish, French, and English.
