= Territorial Control Plan =

Salvadoran security program under Nayib Bukele

- Plan Control Territorial
- Location: El Salvador
- Planned by: Government of El Salvador
- Date: 20 June 2019 – present: Phase one: began 20 June 2019; Phase two: began 2 July 2019; Phase three: began 1 August 2019; Phase four: began 19 July 2021; Phase five: began 23 November 2022; Phase six: began 15 September 2023
- Executed by: Salvadoran Armed Forces; National Civil Police
- Outcome: Ongoing

The Territorial Control Plan (Spanish: Plan Control Territorial, abbreviated PCT) is an ongoing Salvadoran security and anti-gang program. The program consists of six phases and a potential seventh phase if phases one through six are unsuccessful. In 2019, the Salvadoran government estimated that the Territorial Control Plan would cost US$575.2 million in total.

== Background ==
=== Criminal gangs in El Salvador ===
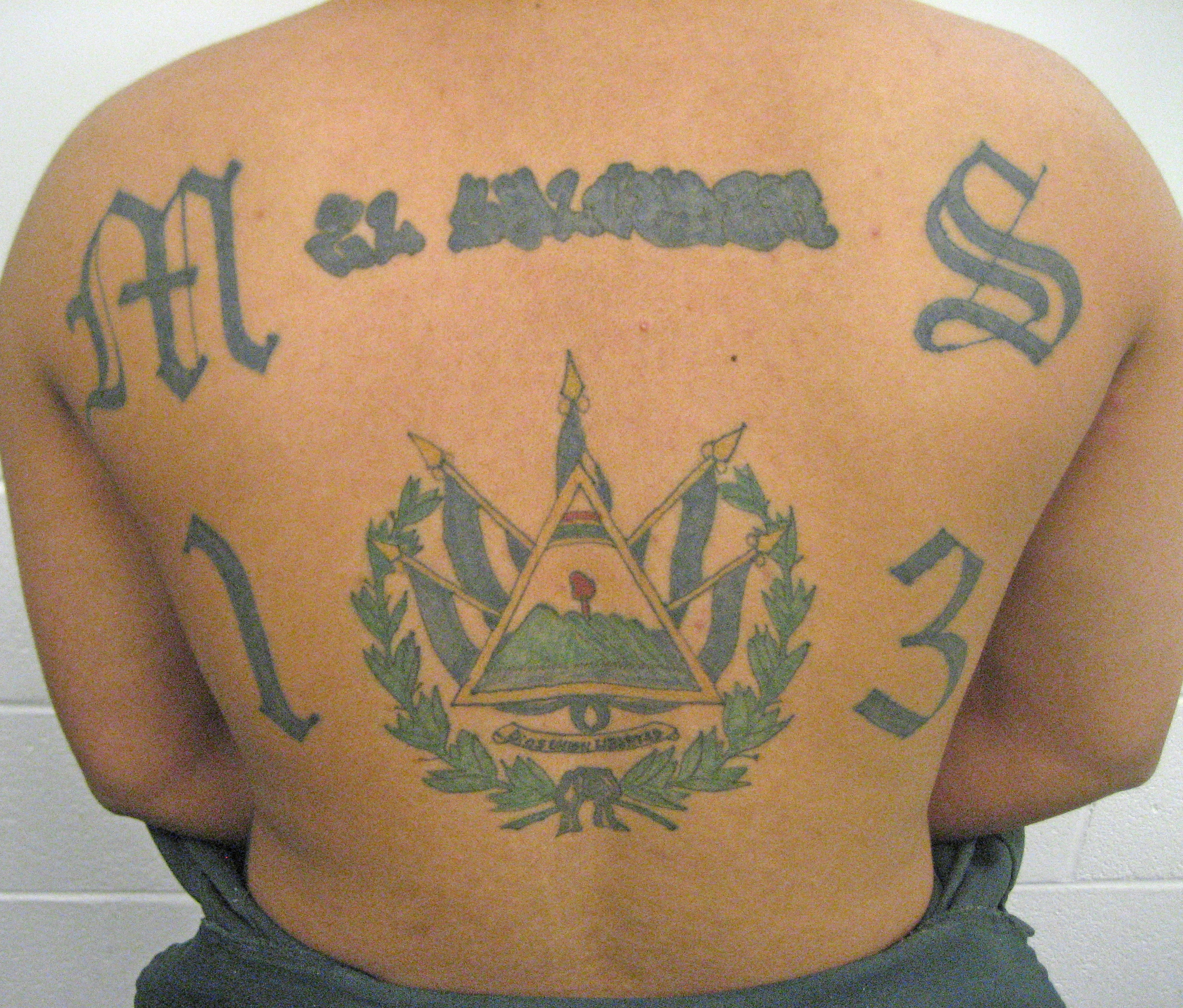
A member of MS-13 with tattoos on his back depicting the coat of arms of El Salvador and the gang's name.

Criminal gangs have been a major problem in El Salvador since the conclusion of the Salvadoran Civil War in 1992. The country's most prominent gangs include Mara Salvatrucha (MS-13), the 18th Street gang (Barrio 18), Mao Mao, Miranda Loca, and La Maquina, among others. Most Salvadoran gangs were formed in the United States; some gangs, such as MS-13, were formed by refugees of the Salvadoran Civil War to protect themselves from Mexican American and African American gangs, meanwhile, other gangs, such as Barrio 18, formed as splinter groups of other gangs. Most gang members arrived in El Salvador after being deported from the United States following the passage of the Illegal Immigration Reform and Immigrant Responsibility Act of 1996.

Most crimes committed in the country since the end of the civil war have been committed by gangs. According to journalist C. Ramos, more violent deaths occurred during the 1990s than occurred during the civil war; During the 1960s and 1970s, the country's homicide rate was 30 homicides per 100,000 inhabitants, meanwhile, from 1994 to 1997, the rate was 80 homicides per 100,000 inhabitants. Other crimes committed by gangs include robbery, motor-vehicle theft, arms trafficking, drug trafficking, extortion, rape, and kidnapping. During the early 2000s, the Salvadoran government estimated that between 50 and 60 percent of all crimes were committed by gangs. In 2019, the Salvadoran government estimated that extortion accounts for 80 percent of the gangs' finances, accounting for 3 percent of the country's gross domestic product. According to an opinion poll conducted by the Central American University during the 2000s, 20.8 percent of Salvadorans believed that gangs were the biggest problem facing the country.

=== La Mano Dura ===
In July 2003, Salvadoran President Francisco Flores implemented anti-gang policies known as La Mano Dura (Spanish for "The Iron Fist") in an attempt to combat gang influence and lower the country's homicide rate. Flores' successor, Antonio Saca, increased the security policies and announced the beginning of Super Mano Dura ("Super Iron Fist"). Methods employed by both policies to combat the gangs included joint patrols conducted by the National Civil Police (PNC) and the Armed Forces of El Salvador (FAES) of gang-controlled territories, random searches of suspected gang members, and arresting individuals who appear they could be gang members. Both policies resulted in the arrests of around 4,000 gang members and resulted in prison overcrowding. Saca's successor, Mauricio Funes, ended some policies of Super Mano Dura, such as mass raids of gang territory, in favor of pursuing criminal investigations. In September 2010, the Legislative Assembly passed the Gang Prohibition Act which made gang membership illegal and allowed the government to freeze bank accounts and seize assets of gang members. In February 2012, Funes increased the militarization of the PNC and instituted a curfew to prevent gang members from being in the streets at night.

=== 2012–2014 gang truce ===
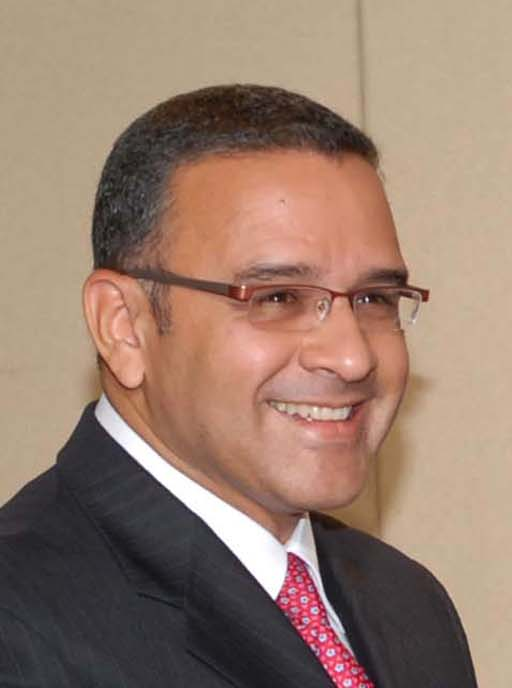
Salvadoran President Mauricio Funes, whose government negotiated a truce with the country's gangs from 2012 to 2014.

In March 2012, the Salvadoran government, the Catholic Church, and the gangs agreed to a truce—known simply as the Gang Truce—to lower the country's homicide rate in exchange for concessions being granted to imprisoned gang members. The truce began when 30 imprisoned leaders of MS-13 and Barrio 18 were transferred from the Zacatecoluca maximum security prison to lower security prisons, which was then succeeded by what InSight Crime's Ramsey Geoffrey described as "the least violent day the country has seen in three years" when the police only registered two homicides. The truce was negotiated by Bishop Fabio Colindres, former deputy of the Legislative Assembly Raúl Mijango, and Minister of Public Security David Munguía Payés, however, the government denied that it had entered negotiations with the gangs; Funes that stated that "the government did not sit down to negotiate with gangs", Munguía stated that "the government of the republic is not at any time negotiating with any gang", and the police attributed the subsequent decrease in homicides to "improved coordination and intelligence". In the first 21 days of March 2012, the country recorded an average of 5 homicides per day, down from 14 homicides per day in both January and February 2012.

In November 2012, as the truce began to fracture with a rise in homicides, Mijango and Colindres announced the implementation of "peace zones" where gangs would aim to eliminate all criminal activities, surrender their weapons, and make peace with rival gang members, in exchange for the police ending night-time anti-gang operations and the government implementing programs which provided work for gang members. By May 2013, the country had 19 peace zones, but homicides continued to rise, and in March 2013, the government stated that the truce was not working in some parts of the country. In July 2013, La Prensa Gráfica reported that the gangs were prepared to end the truce and were stockpiling weapons and vehicles, In March 2014, as homicides averaged 8 per day, PNC director Rigoberto Pleités stated that "the truce technically no longer exists, given the increase in homicides in the past months", and on 26 May 2014, four days before the end of his term as president, Funes stated "the truce has failed, not only because of the decision of those who agreed to it; it is because a state of opinion contrary to it was created; with this, I am not saying that the truce was necessary or the only option". By then, El Salvador averaged around 14 homicides per day. In 2014 and 2015, the gangs offered to begin negotiations to restore the truce, but Funes' successor, Salvador Sánchez Cerén, refused to begin another truce. According to an opinion poll conducted by the Technological University of El Salvador in August 2013, 47 percent of respondents believed the truce benefited the gangs. Additionally, 50 percent believed that the truce had not produced any results.

In the subsequent years following the end of the truce, various government officials have been indicted for their roles in organizing the truce. In July 2020, Attorney General Raúl Melara issued an arrest warrant for Funes for his role in organizing the truce. Funes, who was in exile in Nicaragua, rejected Melara's announcement and denied any wrongdoing. In November 2022 Attorney General Rodolfo Delgado ordered Funes to stand trial for allegedly "grant[ing] benefits to gang members who were in prison" and allegedly engaging in illicit association with the gangs. Funes was tried in absentia between 26 April and 29 May 2023, during which, he was found guilty of all charges presented against him and he was sentenced to serve 14 years imprisonment—8 for illicit association and 6 for failure to perform his duties. Following his sentencing, Funes stated that "the sentence, insofar as it refers to me, is illegal, doesn't have legal foundation", claiming that the government failed to prove the charges against him. In May 2016, Mijango was arrested for his role in the truce. He was tried in August 2017 during the "Truce Trial" with 17 other defendants but was ultimately acquitted; Prosecutors appealed the ruling and a new trial was held in May 2019 where he was again acquitted. Mijango was ultimately sentenced to 13 years imprisonment in 2018 for charges unrelated to the truce and died in prison in August 2023. In July 2020, Munguía was arrested for his role in organizing the truce. In May 2023, he was sentenced to serve 18 years imprisonment—8 years for illicit association, 6 years for failure to perform his duties, and 4 years for committing arbitrary actions. Munguía described his sentencing was "a political condemnation" ("un condenado político"). Colindres has not been arrested or charged for his role in negotiating the truce.

=== Post-truce violence ===
In 2015, the country's homicide rate peaked at 104 homicides per 100,000 people for a total of 6,657 homicides, the most homicides recorded in El Salvador since 1983 during the civil war. Due to the surge in homicides, on 25 August 2015, the Supreme Court officially designated both MS-13 and Barrio 18 as terrorist organizations, stating that both gangs were responsible for "systematic attacks on the lives, security, and personal integrity of the population". As a result of the country's high homicide rate, El Salvador was often described in the media as the "world's deadliest peacetime country".

== Implementation ==
=== Phase one: "Preparation" ===
During the 2019 presidential election, Grand Alliance for National Unity candidate Nayib Bukele won 53 percent of the vote and was elected as the country's president, breaking the two-party system which had ruled the country since the end of the civil war, and Bukele won in part due to voters hoping he would combat the country's gang violence. In April 2019, two months before he took office, Bukele promised that his government would initiate a plan to combat crime.

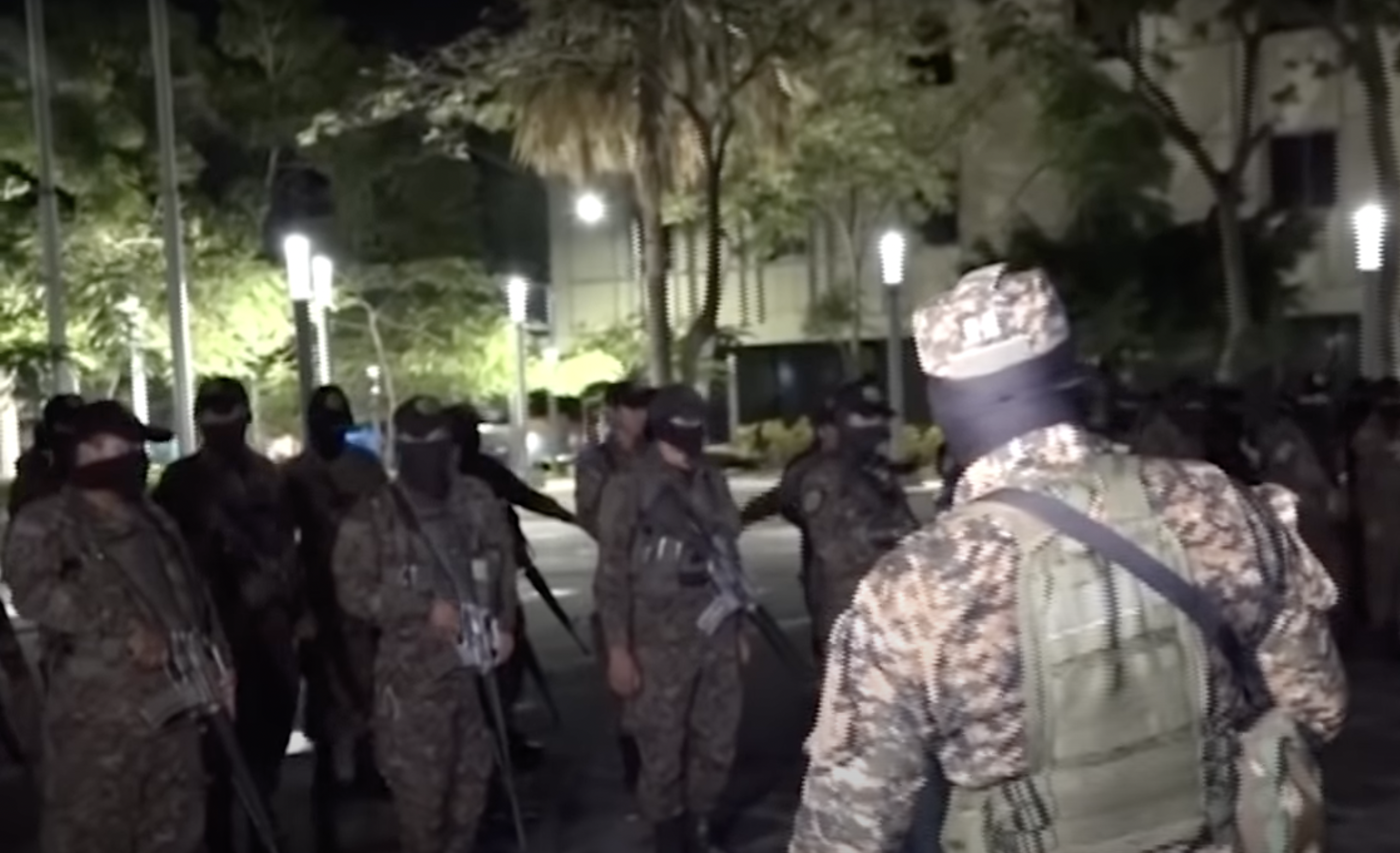
Soldiers in the Gerardo Barrios Plaza at the announcement of the Territorial Control Plan.

On 19 June 2019, Bukele announced that a security plan aimed at disrupting the finances of gangs in the country would be implemented at midnight. He referred to the plan on Twitter as the "Territorial Control Project" ("Proyecto Control Territorial"). At midnight on 20 June 2019, Bukele announced the beginning of the plan, now known as the "Territorial Control Plan" (Plan Control Territorial"), in front of a crowd of personnel from both the PNC and the FAES at the Gerardo Barrios Plaza in central San Salvador, the country's largest and capital city.

Mauricio Arriaza Chicas, the director of the PNC, stated that phase one—known as "preparation"—would be implemented in 12 of the country's 262 municipalities. Arriaza described the 12 municipalities selected—Apopa, Ciudad Delgado, Colón, Ilopango, Mejicanos, San Marcos, San Martín, San Miguel, San Salvador, Santa Ana, Santa Tecla, and Soyapango—as "practically [the] metropolitan area" ("prácticamente [la] área metropolitana"). Rogelio Rivas, the minister of justice and security, stated that phase one would be implemented in historic city centers; police and military personnel would be stationed in places where the gangs would collect extortion and rent money in an effort to disrupt the gangs' finances and to "send a message to the gangs" ("envían un mensaje a las pandillas"). Arriaza stated that 2,500 police officers of the PNC and 3,000 soldiers of the armed forces would be involved in phase one. On 29 July 2019, 1,000 more soldiers were mobilized to implement phase one. As a part of phase one, the government also instituted a state of emergency in the country's prisons. A total of 28 prisons were put on lockdown; no visitations were allowed, prisoners were confined to their cells or moved to more secure prisons, and all cellphone service around prisons was blocked. This state of emergency was lifted on 2 September 2019. In total, phase one cost the government US$31 million.

=== Phase two: "Opportunity" ===
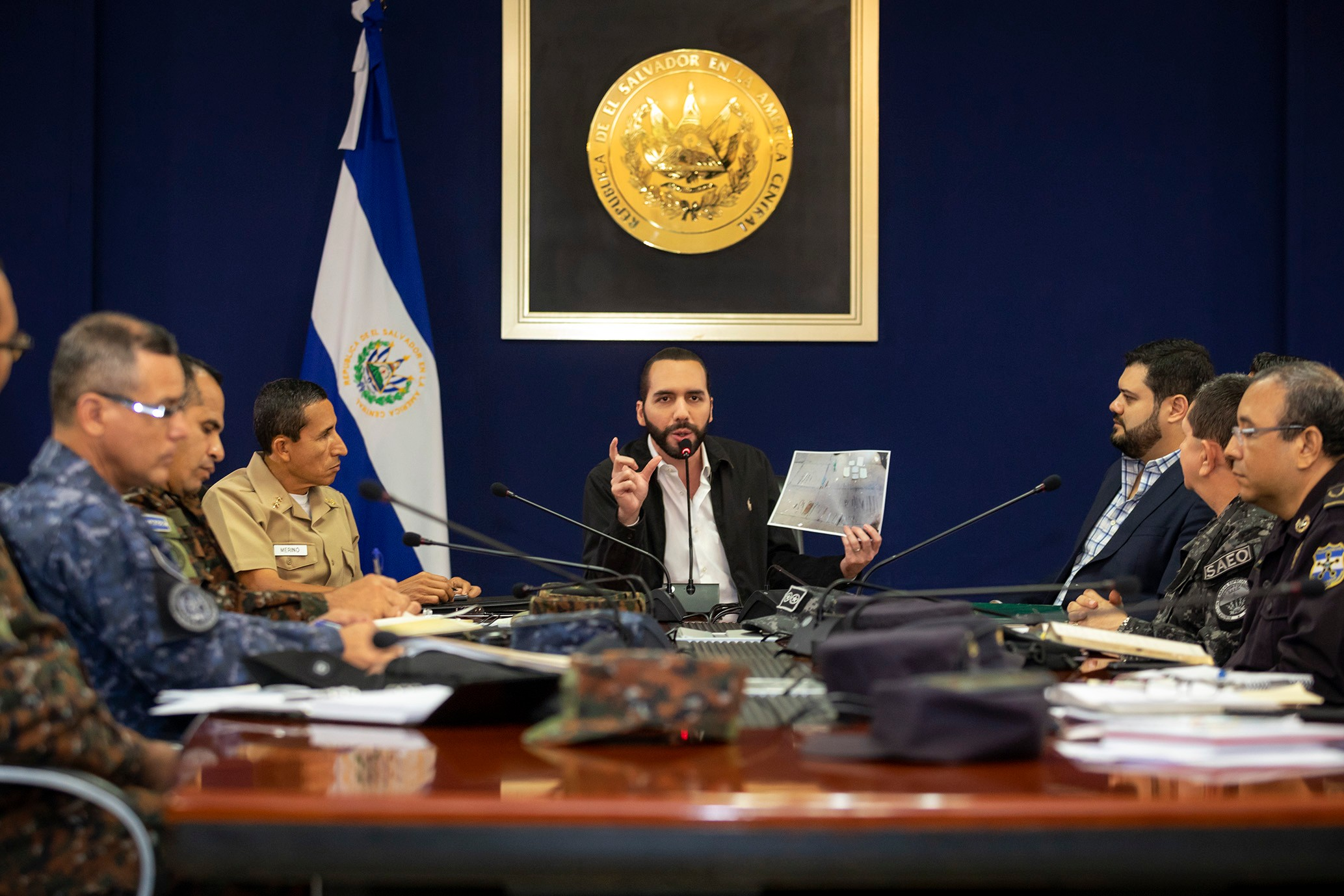
Bukele and his cabinet discussing phase two of the PCT.

On 2 July 2019, Bukele announced the beginning of phase two of the Territorial Control Plan. Known as "opportunity", phase two sought to improve healthcare, promote education and scholarships, and build schools and sports centers in an effort to provide "alternative opportunities" for young Salvadorans and prevent them from joining gangs. The government estimated that the phase would cost US$158 million, but the government only managed to negotiate a US$91 million loan from the Central American Bank for Economic Integration (CABEI) to fund phase two.

=== Phase three: "Modernization" ===
On 1 August 2019, Bukele announced the beginning of phase three of the Territorial Control Plan. Known as "modernization", phase three sought to modernize the weapons and vehicles possessed by the country's security forces to more efficiently combat crime; The phase demanded the issuance of new firearms, bulletproof vests, helmets, radios, night vision cameras, helicopters, and drones to the country's security forces. It also called for improved police patrols and police outposts.

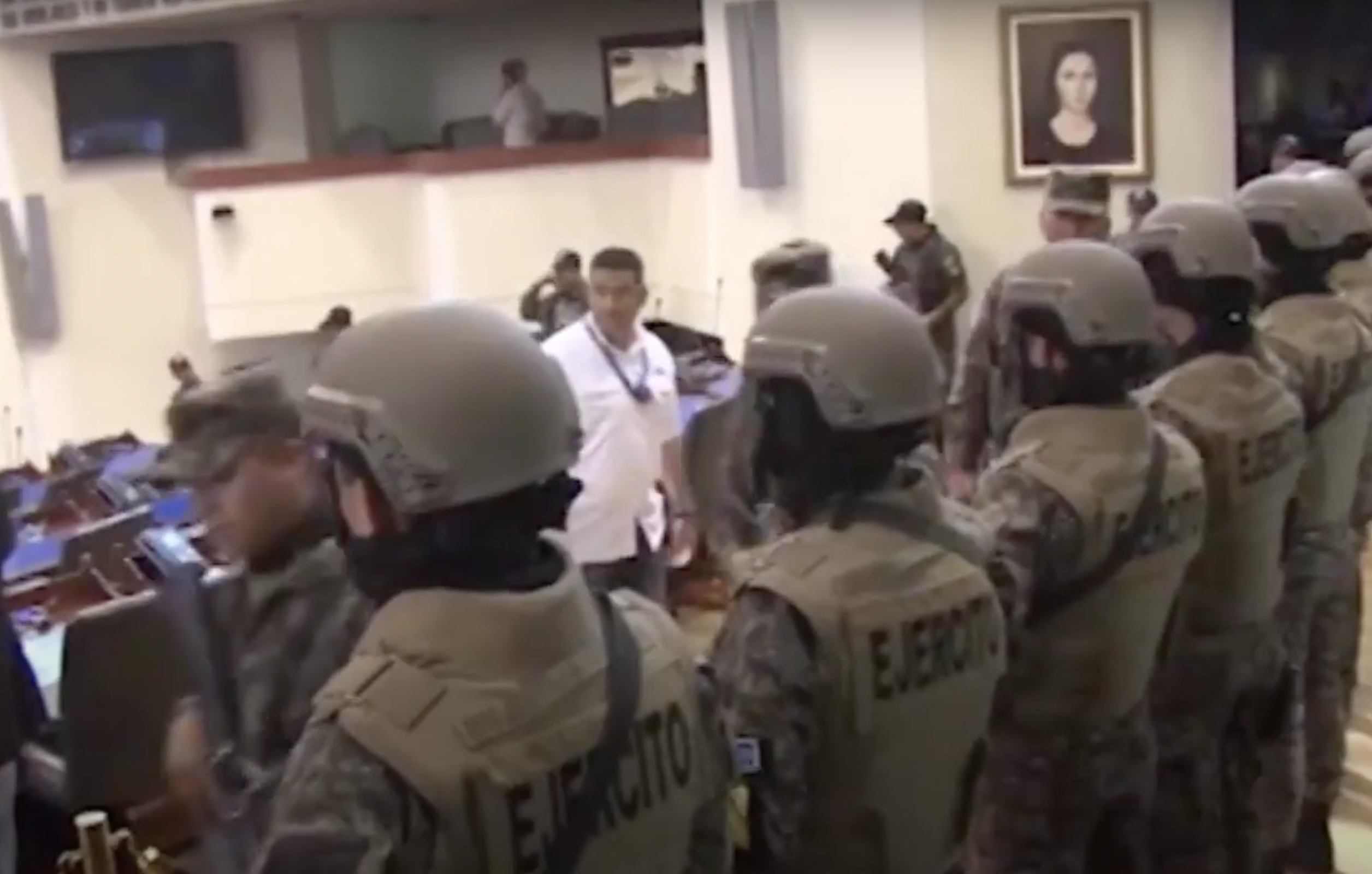
A line of soldiers inside the Legislative Assembly on 9 February 2020

In October 2019, the CABEI agreed to give the Salvadoran government a US$109 million loan to finance phase three, and the South Korean government donated US$5.3 million to finance the phase. On 30 January 2020, the Legislative Assembly voted against approving the US$109 million loan from the CABEI. The two largest political parties—the Nationalist Republican Alliance (ARENA) and the Farabundo Martí National Liberation Front (FMLN)—both voted against its approval, questioning the effectiveness of the Territorial Control Plan and demanding more transparency in where the money would be allocated. In response, on 6 February 2020, Bukele invoked article 167 of the country's constitution, ordering an extraordinary session of the Legislative Assembly to convene on 9 February 2020 to approve the loan from the CABEI. When the extraordinary session convened, Bukele entered the Legislative Assembly accompanied by 40 soldiers, however, less than half of the legislature's members attended the session and the loan was not approved. Mario Ponce, the president of the Legislative Assembly, described the incident as an "attempted coup", to which Bukele responded by stating "if I was a dictator, I would have taken control of everything".

On 18 February 2020, 1,400 more soldiers were mobilized to enforce the Territorial Control Plan in response to the Legislative Assembly's refusal to approve the loan from the CABEI. Bukele stated that "[w]e have to go out and work with or without resources" ("[t]enemos que salir y trabajar con o sin recursos").

=== Phase four: "Incursion" ===
On 19 July 2021, Bukele announced the beginning of phase four of the Territorial Control Plan. Known as "incursion", the phase consisted of the country's security forces directly entering territories with heavy gang influence where the security forces previously found difficult to enter or patrol. During the announcement, Bukele stated that "[a]ll those who are thinking about doing something should think about it multiple times before ending up in jail" ("[t]odos los que estén pensando en hacer algo, deben pensarlo varias veces antes de terminar en la cárcel") as a message to the gangs.

=== Phase five: "Extraction" ===
On 23 November 2022, at a ceremony held in San Juan Opico, Bukele announced the beginning of phase five of the Territorial Control Plan. The phase, known as "extraction", sought to "surround large cities and extract the terrorists who are hiding within the communities, without giving them the slightest possibility of escape", and Bukele stated that 200 police officers would be added to the 20,000 soldiers already patrolling the country's cities.

External videos
- President Nayib Bukele touring the newly-built Terrorism Confinement Center.
- The February 2023 prisoner transfer
- The March 2023 prisoner transfer

In July 2022, Bukele had ordered the construction of a new prison with capacity for 40,000 inmates to hold individuals arrested during the gang crackdown and to relieve overcrowding in the country's other prisons. In February 2023, Bukele posted a video on Twitter of him and members of his cabinet touring the prison, named the Terrorism Confinement Center (CECOT), prior to his opening. Later that month, Bukele posted another video to Twitter showing the first 2,000 prisoners being transferred to CECOT, with the prisoners all with shaved heads and wearing only white gym shorts. He posted another video showing a second prisoner transfer in March 2023. According to an opinion poll conduced by CIESCA in March 2023, 96.4 percent of respondents supported the construction of CECOT while 3.6 percent opposed it. As of 9 July 2023, CECOT had a population of over 12,500 inmates.

=== Phase six: "Integration" ===
On 15 September 2023, during a speech celebrating the country's 202nd anniversary of its independence from Spain, Bukele announced the beginning of phase six of the Territorial Control Plan known as "integration". To implement phase six, Bukele announced the formation of the National Department of Integration led by Alejandro Gutman, the president of the Forever Foundation.

Bukele stated that US$30 million would be allocated annually to fund phase six.

In October 2024, the same department launched a paid internship program for Salvadoran citizens over 60 years old. This initiative aims to promote the labor inclusion of older adults by creating spaces for professional reintegration and leveraging their accumulated experience in various productive sectors.

=== Potential phase seven ===
A seventh phase of the Territorial Control Plan is planned but its name and details have not been disclosed by the Salvadoran government.

== Effects and results ==
In July 2019, the first full month during which the Territorial Control Plan was in effect, the PNC recorded a total of 154 murders. The total of 154 homicides reportedly the country's second lowest monthly total in the 21st century, second only to April 2013 when 143 homicides were recorded, and almost half of the monthly average of around 300 homicides. Additionally, the PNC registered zero homicides on 31 July 2019, the first time that had occurred since 13 January 2017 and only the eighth time it had occurred since 2000. Bukele attributed the decrease in homicides to the Territorial Control Plan, adding that "we didn't expect the reduction [of homicides] to be so quick and so large". Throughout 2021, the PNC recorded a total of 1,147 homicides. Throughout 2022, the PNC recorded a total of 496 homicides. As of 11 September 2023, the PNC has recorded a total of 142 homicides in 2023.

Within two months of the Territorial Control Plan being implemented, the PNC reported that it had arrested over 5,000 people. As of 15 September 2023, over 72,000 people have been arrested during the gang crackdown, 7,000 of whom have since been released.

In 2023, 88% of Salvadorans reported feeling safe walking alone at night making El Salvador one of the safest countries in the world. This far outpaces the rest of Latin America and the Caribbean where the average is 47%. In 2025 El Salvador reported a homicide rate of 1.3 per 100,000 the lowest in the Americas.

== Reactions ==
In August 2019, InSight Crime's Alex Papadovassilakis wrote that it was "far too early" to attribute the decrease in homicides up to that point to the Territorial Control Plan as Bukele had done, adding that the decrease came amidst a consistent trend of decreasing homicide figures which began in 2016. Papadovassilakis also wrote that there were concerns that the government would seek to "artificially reduce the country's homicide rate" by omitting homicides which occurred as a result of confrontations between gangs and the country's security forces.

In July 2021, the Platform for Citizen Security described the Territorial Control Plan as more of an "advertising strategy" ("estrategia publicitaria") rather than a genuine security program. The group also voiced its concern regarding militarization, adding that militarization of the country's security forces was ruled as unconstitutional by the Supreme Court of Justice in 2012.

In 2024, Bukele won reelection with 83% of the vote and his party took 58 of 60 seats in the National Assembly. In May 2026, Bukele boasted an approval rating of 93%.
