= 2020 Salvadoran protests =

Minor protests

The 2020 Salvadoran protests were minor protests by workers, unions, doctors and students calling for the resignation of president Nayib Bukele over the 2020 Salvadoran political crisis and murder, unpaid wages and delay of payments, internet services, working conditions, crime and many more issues in El Salvador. Protesters wore Wichita cloth and have reportedly erected roadblocks and have blockaded small highways, university students led marches from 15 to 16 July and nurses led strikes from 13 to 15 May. Discontent with arbitrary arrests began in late-March against no food or jobs, leading poor citizens to protest and unrest against the arrests of survivors have been ongoing. In March-April, small groups of old and middle-class men have held protests against no work or housing in San Salvador.

== See also ==
- 2020 Salvadoran political crisis
- 2023 Salvadoran protests
