= Mario Ponce =

Salvadoran accountant and politician

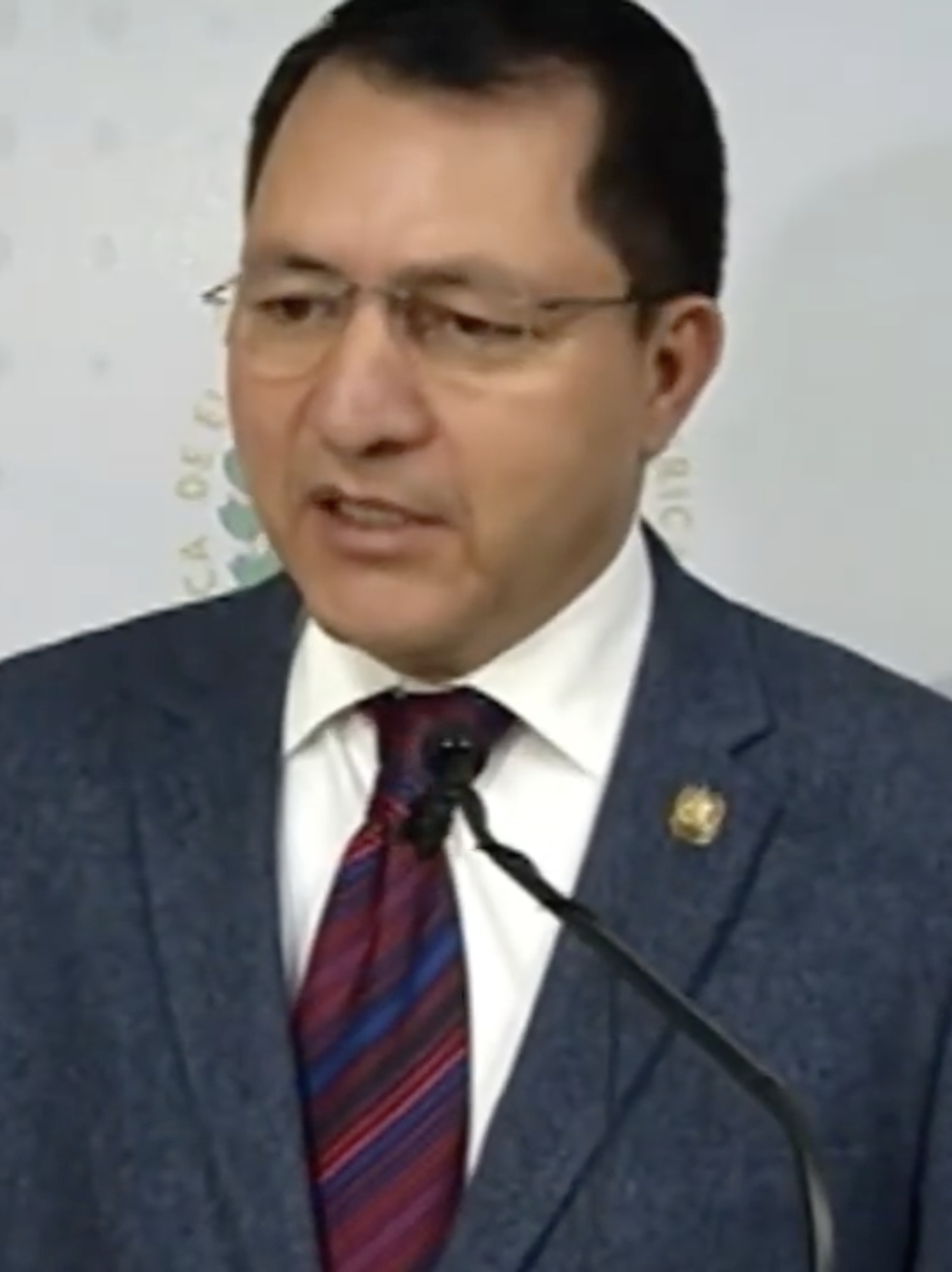
- Ponce in 2019

181st President of the Legislative Assembly of El Salvador
- In office 1 November 2019 – 30 April 2021
- Preceded by: Norman Quijano
- Succeeded by: Ernesto Castro

Deputy of the Legislative Assembly of El Salvador from Cuscatlán
- In office 1 May 2000 – 1 May 2021

Personal details
- Born: 8 February 1963 (age 63) Zacatecoluca, El Salvador
- Party: National Coalition Party

Mario Antonio Ponce López (born 8 February 1963) is a Salvadoran accountant and politician who served as the president of Legislative Assembly of El Salvador from 2019 to 2021. He was elected as a deputy in the assembly in 2018.

He is a member of the National Coalition Party of El Salvador.

Political offices
Preceded by Norman Quijano	President of the Legislative Assembly; 2019–2021	Succeeded by Ernesto Castro
