= Vamos (El Salvador) =

Political party in El Salvador

Let's Go Vamos
- Leader: Cesia Rivas
- Founded: 11 November 2017
- Headquarters: San Salvador
- Membership: 920
- Ideology: Liberalism; Anti-communism
- Political position: Centre
- Colours: Blue, White
- Legislative Assembly: 1 / 60
- Mayors: 0 / 44
- PARLACEN: 0 / 20

Party flag
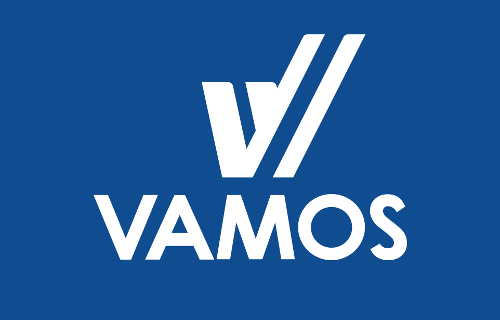

Website
- vamos.org.sv

Vamos (English: Let's Go) is a Salvadoran political party that was registered in November 2017. The party was described by inaugural leader Josué Alvarado as being a "project of ideas, principles and values" that accepts individuals from the political left and right.

== History ==
Vamos was registered to the Supreme Electoral Court (TSE) on 4 November 2017 obtaining 57,382 required signatures, and was legalised on 11 November 2017. Despite registering in 2017, the party was not permitted to participate in the 2018 elections as it missed the deadline for internal party elections.

Vamos participated for the first time in the 2019 presidential election, with the party's membership electing Josué Alvarado as their presidential candidate and Roberto Rivera Ocampo for the vice-presidential candidate. They received 0.76% of the popular vote.

In the 2021 legislative election, the party received 1.01% of the popular vote. They won one seat from the constituency of the department of San Salvador, represented by deputy Claudia Ortiz.

In the 2024 presidential election, the party did not field a candidate for President of El Salvador. The party reelected its one deputy, Claudia Ortiz, to the National Assembly. The party did not elect any mayors.

== Ideology ==
In 2017, then-national coordinator and former deputy Josué Alvarado described the party as a "project of ideas, principles and values" that rejects "messianic leaders".

== Party leadership ==
Cesia Rivas has been the leader of Vamos since 2023.

== Electoral history ==
=== Presidential elections ===
Election	Candidate	First round			Second round			Result
Election	Candidate	Votes	%	Pos.	Votes	%	Pos.	Result
2019	Josué Alvarado	20,763	0.76%	▲4th	—			Lost ✗
2024	Did not participate							
2027	Will not participate							

=== Legislative Assembly elections ===
Election	Votes	%	Position	Seats	+/–	Status in legislature
2018	Did not participate					Extraparliamentary
2021	26,492	1.01	▲8th	1 / 84	New	Opposition
2024	91,675	2.94	▲5th	1 / 60	0	Opposition
2027	To be determined					

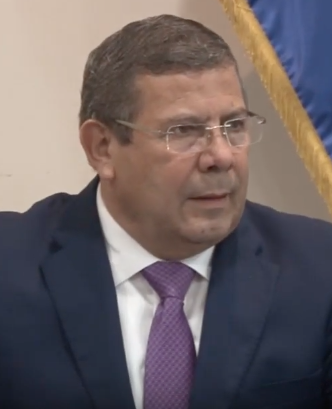
Josué Alvarado Flores, the leader of Vamos until 2022 and its 2019 presidential candidate

=== Municipal elections ===
Election	Votes	%	Position	Seats	+/–	Ref.
2018	Did not participate					
2021	10,413	0.39	▲8th	1 / 262	New	
2024	8,994	0.56	▼10th	0 / 44	▼1	
2027	To be determined					

== See also ==
- List of political parties in El Salvador
- Politics of El Salvador
