= Supreme Court of Justice of El Salvador =

Highest Court of El Salvador

Logo Institucional Corte Suprema de Justicia de El Salvador

The Supreme Court of Justice of El Salvador (Spanish: Corte Suprema de Justicia de El Salvador) is the highest court of El Salvador. The court sits in San Salvador. The current president is Henry Alexander Mejía.

== Composition and criteria ==
The Supreme Court is part of the judicial branch of El Salvador. It is composed of 15 judges and an equal number of substitutes. The magistrates are elected by the Legislative Assembly of El Salvador for nine-year terms, which are reviewed every three years. A two-thirds vote of legislators is necessary. Under the 1983 Constitution of El Salvador, the legislature also designates one judge as the President of the Supreme Court. This person is also then the head of the judicial branch and the Constitutional Court.

Article 176 of the Constitution establishes the criteria for a Supreme Court judgeship:

- Born in El Salvador
- "Belong to the secular state" (that is, not be ordained to the priesthood)
- More than 40 years old
- Be an Attorney of the Republic
- Be of good moral character and good reputation for competence
- have been a Second Instance Magistrate for six years or a First Instance Magistrate for nine years, or have practiced law for ten years' minimum before joining the court.
- Have not been deprived of any privileges of citizenship in the last six years

== Organization and functions ==
The Supreme Court is organized into four courts:

- Constitutional Court, with five judges. According to Article 174 of the constitution, the court is the only tribunal to decide cases related to:
  - the constitutionality of laws, decrees, and regulations
  - amparo (constitutional protection except for physical liberty, covered by habeas)
  - habeas corpus
  - controversies between the legislative and executive branches
- Administrative Disputes Court, with four judges. This court hears cases related to:
  - Controversies between the public administration and "los particulares" related to administrative remedies
- Civil Court, three judges, charged with:
  - Appeals in civil, economic, labor and family matters
- Criminal Court, three judges
  - Appeals in criminal cases.

== Current members ==
The following is the current composition of the Supreme Court of Justice of El Salvador.

Title	Judge	Chamber	Joined court	Current position
President	Dr. Henry Alexander Mejía¹	Constitutional	2021	24 September 2024
Judge	Elsy Dueñas Lovos	Constitutional	2012	November 2024
Judge	Vacant	Constitutional	–	
Judge	Luis Javier Suárez Magaña	Constitutional	May 2021	
Judge	Héctor Nahun Martínez	Constitutional	2021	
Judge	Óscar Alberto López Jerez²	Civil	September 2015	24 September 2024
Judge	Alex David Marroquín Martínez	Civil	2018	2024
Judge	Lidia Patricia Castillo Amaya	Civil	24 September 2024	
Judge	Alejandro Antonio Quinteros Espinoza²	Criminal	2023	2024
Judge	Sandra Luz Chicas	Criminal	2025	July 2021
Judge	Roberto Carlos Calderón Escobar	Criminal	2018	2021
Judge	José Ernesto Clímaco Valiente²	Administrative	2021	
Judge	Vicente Alexander Rivas Romero	Administrative	September 2024	
Judge	José Fernando Marroquín Galo	Administrative	September 2024	
Judge	Miguel Elías Martínez Cortez	Administrative	September 2024	

Notes:

¹ President of the Supreme Court of Justice and the Constitutional Court;
² President of the respective chambers.

== History ==
The Supreme Court of Justice was established in 1824, and Joaquín Durán y Aguilar was its first president.

This court began its work on April 25, 1825.

Following the end of the Salvadoran Civil War, the Commission on the Truth for El Salvador and the Ad Hoc Commission identified weaknesses in the judiciary and recommended solutions, the most dramatic being the replacement of all the judges on the Supreme Court. This recommendation was fulfilled in 1994 when an entirely new court was elected.

== Criticism ==
One problem the Supreme Court needs to solve is the speed with which the courts resolve criminal cases. In 2000, for example, some 48% of prisoners did not have a firm sentence.

On the other hand, the Supreme Court will decide against the executive branch, demonstrating some independence. There is constant battle between the judicial and executive branch over the application of the anti-gang laws.

But at the national level, the Supreme Court is criticized for being too dependent on the legislative branch, who is responsible for naming the judges. At the time of election of judges, the different parties negotiate their votes, and the election is usually a form of political compromise. Judges are also thought to be of varied quality throughout the country, and in some places, cases take a very long time and many years are spent resolving controversial cases. The Constitutional Court has also been criticized for taking too long to issue decisions, which some say results in justice delayed too long.
