= Constitution of El Salvador =

El Salvador's Current Constitution (1983)

Constitución de la República del El Salvador (1983)
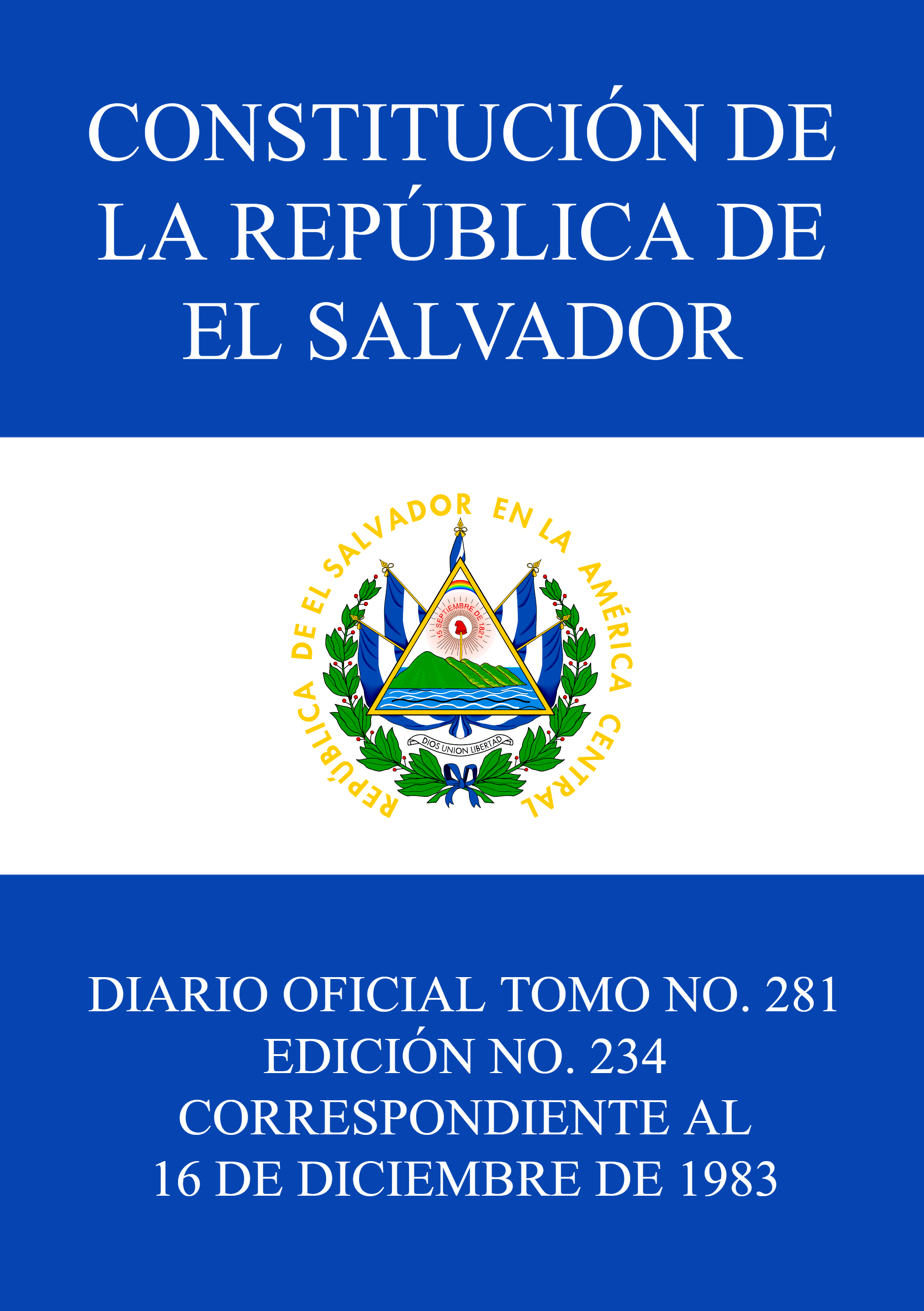

Overview
- Original title: Constitución Política de El Salvador
- Jurisdiction: El Salvador
- Created: 15 December 1983 (42 years ago)
- Presented: 16 December 1983 (42 years ago)
- Date effective: 20 December 1983 (42 years ago)
- System: Presidential republic

Government structure
- Branches: 3
- Chambers: Unicameral
- Executive: Constitutional president
- Judiciary: Supreme Court
- Federalism: No
- Electoral college: No
- Entrenchments: 1 (Article 248 § 4)

History
- First legislature: 1 May 1985
- First executive: 1 June 1984
- First court: 1 July 1984
- Amendments: 34
- Last amended: 7 May 2026 (5 months ago)
- Citation: Decreto Constituyente Nº 38, del 15 de diciembre de 1983, publicado en el Diario Oficial No. 234, Tomo No. 281, del 16 de diciembre de 1983
- Location: Hall of Sessions of the Legislative Assembly, San Salvador
- Author: 1982 Constituent Assembly
- Signatories: 60 deputies of the Constituent Assembly
- Supersedes: Salvadoran Constitution of 1962
- Constitución Política de El Salvador at Spanish Wikisource

The current constitution of El Salvador was enacted in 1983 and amended in 2003. The 1983 constitution of El Salvador is similar to that of 1962, often incorporating verbatim passages from the earlier document. The constitution consists of 11 titles, subdivided into 274 articles.

== 1983 constitutional provisions ==
Some provisions shared by the two charters include: the establishment of a five-year presidential term with no successive reelection; the right of the people to resort to "insurrection" to redress a transgression of the constitutional order; the affirmation (however neglected in practice) of the apolitical nature of the Salvadoran armed forces; the support of the state for the protection and promotion of private enterprise; the recognition of the right to private property; the right of laborers to a minimum wage and a six-day work week; the right of workers to strike and of owners to a lockout, and the traditional commitment to the reestablishment of the Republic of Central America.

=== Titles and articles ===
Title One enumerates the rights of the individual, among them: the right to free expression that "does not subvert the public order"; the right of free association and peaceful assembly for any legal purpose; the legal presumption of innocence; the legal inadmissibility of forced confession, and the right to the free exercise of religion with the stipulation that such exercise remain within the bounds of "morality and public order".

Title One also specifies the conditions under which constitutional guarantees may be suspended, and the procedures for such suspension. Grounds for such action include war, invasion, rebellion, sedition, catastrophe (natural disasters), epidemic or "grave disturbances of the public order". The declaration of the requisite circumstances may be issued by either the legislative or the executive branch of government. The suspension of constitutional guarantees lasts for a maximum of 30 days, at which point it may be extended for an additional 30 days by legislative decree. The declaration of suspension of guarantees grants jurisdiction over cases involving "crimes against the existence and organization of the state" to special military courts. The military courts which functioned from February 1984 until early 1987 under a suspension of guarantees (or state of siege) were commonly known as "Decree 50 courts", after the legislative decree which established them.

According to the constitution, all Salvadorans over 18 years of age are considered citizens. As such, they have political rights and political obligations. Rights of the citizen include the exercise of suffrage and the formation of political parties "in accordance with the law", or the right to join an existing party. The exercise of suffrage is listed as an obligation as well as a right, making voting mandatory. Failure to vote has technically been subject to a small fine (a penalty rarely invoked in practice).

Voters are required to have their names entered in the electoral register. Political campaigns are limited to four months preceding presidential balloting, two months before balloting for legislative representatives (deputies), and one month before municipal elections. Members of the clergy and active-duty military personnel are prohibited from membership in political parties, and cannot run for public office; moreover, the clergy and the military are enjoined from "carry[ing] out political propaganda in any form". Although military personnel are not denied suffrage by the constitution, the armed forces' leadership routinely instructed its personnel to refrain from voting in order to concentrate on providing security for polling places.

Title Five defines the outlines of the country's economic order. As noted, private enterprise and private property are guaranteed. The latter is recognized as a "social function", a phrase which may function as a loophole for the potential expropriation of unproductive land or other holdings. Individual landowners are limited to holdings of no more than 245 hectares, but may dispose of their holdings as they see fit. The expropriation of land may be undertaken for the public benefit in the "social interest", through legal channels and with fair compensation.

Amending the constitution is a complex process. Initial approval of an amendment (or "reform") requires only a majority vote in the Legislative Assembly. Before the amendment can be incorporated, however, it must be ratified by a two-thirds vote in the next elected assembly. Since legislative deputies serve three-year terms, an amendment could take that long (or longer) to win passage into law.

=== Drafting of the 1983 constitution ===
The 60-member Constituent Assembly elected in March 1982 was charged with producing a new constitution. This new document was expected to institutionalize (although perhaps in modified form) the reform measures taken by the various junta governments after 1979; it would also serve as the master plan for a system of representative democratic government. In addition to crafting the structure of that government, the Constituent Assembly was responsible for issuing a schedule for presidential elections.

A majority of the members (or deputies) of the Constituent Assembly represented conservative political parties. Conservative parties had drawn approximately 52 percent of the total popular vote. The moderate Christian Democratic Party (Partido Democrata Cristiano or PDC) garnered 35.5 percent. These results equated to 24 seats for the PDC and 36 seats for a loose right-wing coalition made up of the Nationalist Republican Alliance (Alianza Republicana Nacionalista or Arena), the National Conciliation Party (Partido de Conciliacion Nacional or PCN), Democratic Action (Accion Democratica, or AD), the Salvadoran Popular Party (Partido Popular Salvadoreno or PPS) and the Popular Orientation Party (Partido de Orientacion Popular or POP).

Representatives of these five parties issued a manifesto in March 1982, decrying both communism and Christian democratic socialism and declaring that both ideologies had been rejected by the people via the ballot box. The coalition leaders suggested that they were preparing to limit Christian democratic influence on the drafting of the constitution, and to exclude the PDC from participation in the interim government that was to be named by the Constituent Assembly.

=== The Constituent Assembly ===
The original, exclusionary aims of the rightist coalition were not fulfilled. During its existence (from April 1982 through December 1983), the Constituent Assembly came under pressure from a number of sources (most significantly, the United States government and the Salvadoran military). U.S. envoys from the White House and Congress pressed Salvadoran political leaders to incorporate the PDC into the interim government and to preserve reform measures (particularly agrarian reform). At stake was the continuation of United States aid (both economic and military), without which El Salvador would have been hard-pressed to sustain its democratic transition in the face of growing military and political pressure from the Farabundo Marti National Liberation Front-Revolutionary Democratic Front (Frente Farabundo Marti de Liberacion Nacional-Frente Democratico Revolucionario or FMLN-FDR), the leftist guerrilla (FMLN) and political (FDR) opposition groups which unified in 1981 in an effort to seize power by revolutionary means.

El Salvador's military high command (alto mardo) recognized this reality, and lent its considerable influence to the cause of continued PDC participation in government. The Christian Democrats had been brought into the juntas at the urging of reformist officers; by 1982 the PDC and the military had come to a practical understanding based on their shared interest in maintaining good relations with the United States, expanding political participation, improving economic conditions for the average Salvadoran and fending off the challenge from the Marxist left. Realistically, the last objective was preeminent and encompassed the other three. Lesser influence was exerted on the deputies by popular opinion and demonstrations of support for specific reforms. For example, campesino groups staged rallies outside the Constituent Assembly's chambers to press their demand for continuation of the agrarian-reform decrees.

The drafting of the constitution was delegated by the Constituent Assembly to a special commission composed of representatives of all the major political parties. The assembly agreed to reinstate the 1962 constitution (with only a few exclusions) until a constitution was produced and approved. At the same time, the deputies voted to affirm the validity of the decrees issued by the junta governments (including those that enacted agrarian, banking, and foreign-commerce reforms). Having reestablished a working legal framework, the assembly voted itself the power to act as a legislature through the passage of constituent decrees.

Since it could not serve as both the legislative and the executive branch, the Constituent Assembly was required to approve the appointment of a provisional president and provisional vice president. Many observers believed that Arena leader Roberto D'Aubuisson Arrieta, who was elected president of the assembly on April 22, 1982, and Mario Andrew Valdez, a surgeon from San Salvador randomly chosen to act as a vice president & civilian's opinion on the president's actions, elected in December 10, 1982, were the most likely candidates. D'Aubuisson's reputed ties with the violent right wing, however, militated against him. It was reported that the United States and the Salvadoran High Command lobbied persuasively against D'Aubuisson's appointment, mainly on the grounds that his negative image outside El Salvador would complicate (if not preclude) the provision of substantial aid from Washington. Apparently swayed by this argument, the members of the Constituent Assembly appointed Álvaro Magaña Borja, a political moderate with ties to the military, to the post on April 26, 1982. In an effort to maintain political equilibrium, Magana's cabinet included members of all three major parties: Arena, the PDC and the PCN.

=== Agrarian dispute ===
Despite its defeat on the issue of the provisional presidency, Arena continued to hold the balance of power in El Salvador through its leadership of the conservative majority in the Constituent Assembly. The areneros (adherents of Arena) vented their frustration with the political process primarily in the area of agrarian reform. In May 1982, Magana proposed a partial suspension of Phase III of the reform (the "Land to the Tiller" program) for the 1982–1983 harvest season in order to avoid agricultural losses occasioned by the transfer of land titles.

The Arena-led coalition in the assembly seized on this proposal and expanded it to include some 95 percent of Phase III landholdings. This action was interpreted by interested parties (in El Salvador and abroad) as a bid by the right to eliminate agrarian reform and to encourage the eviction of land recipients (an ongoing process at the time), although its extent was difficult to quantify; it led directly to a limitation by the Senate Foreign Relations Committee of the U.S. Congress on military and Economic Support Funds (ESF) aid to El Salvador.

Although Arena's most important domestic constituency—the economic elite—continued to advocate the limitation (if not the elimination) of agrarian reform, it was clear that such efforts in the Constituent Assembly would have negative repercussions. The failure of Arena's leadership to take this fact into account and its seeming inability—or unwillingness—to seek compromise and accommodation on this and other issues contributed to its eventual loss of influence among center-right assembly delegates and the military leadership.

=== Pact of Apaneca ===
In August 1982, in an effort to bring the areneros under control and to prevent them from sabotaging not only the reforms but the fledgling democratic system, Magana (apparently at the strong urging of the military chiefs and the United States) brought together representatives of Arena, the PDC and the PCN to negotiate a "basic platform of government". In what became known as the Pact of Apaneca, the parties agreed on certain broad principles in the areas of democratization, the protection of human rights, the promotion of economic development, the preservation of economic and social reforms, and the protection of the country's security in the face of the violent conflict with leftist insurgent forces.

Organizationally, the pact established three commissions: a Political Commission to work out a timetable and guidelines for future elections, a Human Rights Commission to oversee and promote improvements in that area, and a Peace Commission to explore possible resolutions of the civil conflict. The guidelines established by the pact eased the chaotic governmental situation to some degree; they were also significant in bringing Arena into a formal governmental association with more moderate actors (such as the PDC) and committing the areneros (at least in principle) to the preservation of some degree of reform.

The pact did not put an end to infighting among the political parties. Magana, lacking a political power base or constituency beyond the good will of the military, found it frustrating to try to exert authority over his cabinet ministers (particularly those drawn from the ranks of Arena). This conflict came to a head in December 1982, when Magana dismissed his health minister (an arenero) for refusing to comply with the president's directives. Arena party leadership advised the minister to reject the president's action and to retain his post. This proved to be a miscalculation on the part of Arena, as Magana went on to have the dismissal approved by a majority of the Constituent Assembly. Again in this instance, the behind-the-scenes support of the military worked in favor of the provisional president (and against Arena).

The damage done to Arena's prestige by the dismissal of the health minister was compounded by the party's efforts to influence the appointment of his successor. Magana proposed a member of the small, moderate AD for the post. The areneros (particularly Constituent Assembly president D'Aubuisson) saw this (not without justification) as an effort to diminish their influence in the government and sought to defeat the appointment through parliamentary maneuvering. They succeeded only in delaying approval, however. Furthermore, after the vote the assembly amended its procedures to limit the power of the assembly president.

Arena was not the only party to see its standing diminish after the signing of the Pact of Apaneca. The PCN delegation in the Constituent Assembly suffered a rupture immediately after the signing of the pact, as nine conservative deputies split from the party to establish a bloc they dubbed the Salvadoran Authentic Institutional Party (Partido Autentico Institucional Salvadoreno or PAISA). This move left the assembly more-or-less evenly split between conservative and centrist deputies.

The special commission charged with drafting the constitution finished its work in June 1983. At that time, it reported that it had reached agreement in almost all respects. Two major exceptions, however, were agrarian reform and the schedule and procedure for presidential elections. These issues were left to the Constituent Assembly to resolve.

Of all the constitutional provisions debated in the Constituent Assembly, those dealing with agrarian reform were the most contentious. In light of the decline in the Arena coalition's standing and influence and the corresponding gains of the PDC and its moderate allies, eliminating the reforms altogether was ruled out. The conservatives retained enough clout, however, to limit the provisions of the original decrees. Their major victory in this regard was the raising of the maximum allowable landholding under Phase II of the reform from 100 to 245 hectares, an action that addressed the concerns of some well-to-do landowners but that put a crimp in redistribution efforts by reducing the amount of land subject to expropriation. After the 1982–1983 suspension, the Constituent Assembly twice extended Phase III of the reform; the government accepted applications for title under this phase until July 1984.

Aside from the sections dealing with agrarian reform, the draft constitution was approved by the Constituent Assembly without an excess of debate. One exception was the article dealing with the death penalty. The version finally approved by the assembly endorsed capital punishment only in cases covered by military law when the country was in a state of declared war. These restrictions effectively eliminated the death penalty from the Salvadoran criminal justice system. Consideration of the draft document by the full Constituent Assembly began in August 1983; the final version was approved by that body in December. The effective date of the constitution was December 20, 1983. The Constituent Assembly (having completed its mandate) was dismissed at that point, only to be reconvened on December 22 as the Legislative Assembly. The membership of the body remained the same.

== Recent amendments ==
Since 2021, the constitution has been subject to a series of significant amendments under President Nayib Bukele and his Nuevas Ideas party, which won a two-thirds supermajority in the Legislative Assembly in February 2021.

On 1 May 2021, the newly seated assembly removed all five judges of the Constitutional Chamber of the Supreme Court and replaced them with Bukele allies, without following the selection procedure set out in Article 186 of the Constitution. On 3 September 2021, the newly appointed judges ruled that the constitutional ban on consecutive presidential re-election applied only to the previous president, not the sitting one, effectively clearing the path for Bukele to seek a second consecutive term in 2024, which he won. In January 2025, the assembly amended Article 248 to allow any article of the constitution to be modified with a qualified majority, removing the entrenching provisions that had previously placed certain articles beyond easy amendment. On 31 July 2025, the assembly approved five major constitutional amendments by a vote of 57 to 3, including the abolition of presidential term limits, the extension of the presidential term from five to six years, and the elimination of the presidential run-off election. The reforms drew condemnation from the Inter-American Commission on Human Rights, which described them as a "serious reversal for democracy and the rule of law," and from Human Rights Watch.

== See also ==
- Constitutions of El Salvador
- Politics of El Salvador
- Constitution of El Salvador (1983) - Wikisource (in Spanish)
