= Corruption in El Salvador =

Corruption in El Salvador is a problem at all levels of government, however, according to a poll conducted by the Cid-Gallup in February 2023, only 4 percent of Salvadorans believed corruption as the most pressing issue facing the country.

== Government corruption ==
=== Presidential corruption ===
On 6 September 2014, former President Francisco Flores Pérez (1999–2004) was arrested on corruption charges for allegedly misappropriating US$15 million during his presidency. In December 2015, he was charged with embezzlement and illicit enrichment and was ordered to stand trial, but he died in January 2016 before his trial started. In 2021, he was named in the Pandora Papers as having used companies in Panama and the British Virgin Islands to hide funds.

On 10 February 2016, former President Mauricio Funes (2009–2014) was ordered by the Supreme Court to stand trial for alleged illegal enrichment after he was unable to verify the source of US$700,000 in his personal bank accounts. He was found guilty of illegal enrichment on 28 November 2017 and was ordered to pay US$420,000. Overall, Funes has been accused of embezzling US$351 million during his presidency. On 23 February 2023, a judge ordered Funes to stand trial for allegedly laundering US$8.4 million through a Guatemalan company. Funes remains in exile in Nicaragua after he was granted asylum in September 2016.

In October 2016, Former President Antonio Saca (2004–2009) was arrested on corruption charges. On 12 September 2018, he was sentenced to ten years imprisonment after he pled guilty to embezzling and laundering US$300 million of public funds during his presidency. He was ordered to pay US$260 million. On 19 September 2019, he was sentenced to an additional two years imprisonment for attempting to bribe a court official with US$10,000 for information regarding the initial corruption case against him. On 5 January 2021, he was found guilty of illicit enrichment and was ordered to pay an additional US$4.4 million.

In May 2021, the United States named five members of President Nayib Bukele's government as being corrupt.

On 22 July 2021, the Attorney General Rodolfo Delgado ordered the arrest of former President Salvador Sánchez Cerén (2014–2019) as a part of a corruption probe. He was charged with embezzlement, money laundering, and illegal enrichment during his presidency. Sánchez Cerén remains in exile in Nicaragua.

In October 2021, former President Alfredo Cristiani (1989–1994) was named in the Pandora Papers as having used companies in Panama and the British Virgin Islands to hide funds. In June 2023, Cristiani's properties were raided and seized by the office of the attorney general as a part of a "war against corruption".

=== Negotiations with gangs ===
Salvadoran politicians from the Nationalist Republican Alliance (ARENA), the Grand Alliance for National Unity (GANA), Nuevas Ideas (NI), and the Farabundo Martí National Liberation Front (FMLN) have been accused of paying criminal gangs (Mara Salvatrucha and 18th Street gang) to support their electoral campaigns. Criminal gangs were also known for organizing extortion schemes.

Funes' government organized a truce between the government and the gangs to lower the country's crime rate between 2012 and 2014. Funes has denied ever granting the gangs "perks" during the truce.

On 23 July 2020, David Munguía Payés, a former Minister of National Defense (2009–2011, 2013–2019), was arrested for allegedly negotiating a truce with gangs to reduce crime.

In September 2020, the news website El Faro accused Bukele of secretly negotiating with gangs to lower the country's murder rate in exchange for better prison conditions. Bukele denied the accusations and launched an investigation into El Faro for money laundering. In December 2021, the United States Department of the Treasury also accused Bukele of negotiating with gangs to lower the murder rate, which Bukele again denied.

On 4 June 2021, Ernesto Muyshondt, a former mayor of San Salvador (2018–2021), was arrested under suspicion of having committed electoral fraud and illegal negotiations with criminal gangs to gain votes for ARENA in the 2014 presidential election. On November 11, 2022, former San Salvador mayor Norman Quijano (2012–2015) was ordered to stand trial for allegedly offering favors to criminal gangs in exchange for their support during his 2014 presidential campaign. In April 2024, he was sentenced in absentia to 13 years and 4 months in prison for illicit negotiations and electoral fraud. However, the ruling is under review by the Penal Chamber of El Salvador’s Supreme Court, and his legal team has filed an appeal. Quijano and his attorneys contend that the proceedings were politically motivated and argue that his parliamentary immunity, as a representative to the Central American Parliament (PARLACEN), was improperly revoked by the Salvadoran Legislative Assembly. Critics of the case claim the judiciary has increasingly come under the influence of the ruling party.

=== Other cases ===
In October 2021, two deputies of the Legislative Assembly, José Ilofio García Torres and Gerardo Balmore Aguilar Soriano, were accused of "conspiracy against the political institution" for allegedly being bribed with "perks" such as U.S. citizenship by the embassy of the United States in San Salvador to fracture 15 to 25 deputies of Nuevas Ideas to oppose Bukele's political agenda. The U.S. embassy denied the allegations. In February 2023, García Torres was sentenced to three years imprisonment for corruption.

== Anti-corruption efforts ==
On 6 September 2019, Bukele announced the establishment of the International Commission Against Impunity in El Salvador (CICIES) (es) as a joint effort with the Organization of American States (OAS) to combat corruption, drug trafficking, and white collar crimes in the country. CICIES would cooperate with the anti-corruption unit of the National Civil Police (PNC). CICIES was dissolved on 4 June 2021 by the Salvadoran government in protest of the OAS' decision to appoint Muyshondt as an anti-corruption advisor.

== Corruption Perceptions Index ==
The following graphs and tables display El Salvador's score and ranking in Transparency International's Corruption Perceptions Index (CPI) since 1998, the first year the country was included in the index.

In the Corruption Perceptions Indexes of 1998 to 2011, countries were scored on a scale from 0 ("perceived as highly corrupt") to 10 ("perceived as very clean"). The rank in the Index was computed separately from the score. In the methodology used to create these Indexes, the ranks and scores were not intended to be compared from year to year; a country's rank or score in a given year's Index is meaningful only in relation the ranks and scores of other countries that year.

Rank by year

Score by year

Year	Rank	Score	Ref.
1998	51	3.6	
1999	49	3.9	
2000	43	4.1	
2001	54	3.6	
2002	62	3.4	
2003	59	3.7	
2004	51	4.2	
2005	51	4.2	
2006	57	4.0	
2007	67	4.0	
2008	67	3.9	
2009	84	3.4	
2010	78	3.6	
2011	80	3.4	

Starting in 2012, a different methodology was used to create the CPI. The 1998-2011 Corruption Perception Indexes are therefore not directly comparable with the Indexes of 2012 and after.

To underline the difference between the two sets of Indexes, those of 2012 and after score countries on a scale from 0 ("highly corrupt") to 100 ("very clean"), in contrast to the 0 to 10 scale of the 1998-2011 Indexes. The countries are then ranked by score; the country ranked first is perceived to have the most honest public sector. Scores computed for the 2012 CPI and afterwards can be meaningfully compared from year to year, as long as the year is 2012 or later

Year	Rank	Rank Δ	Score	Score Δ	Ref.
2012	83	n/a	38	n/a	
2013	83	0	38	0	
2014	80	▲3	39	▲1	
2015	72	▲8	39	0	
2016	95	▼23	36	▼3	
2017	112	▼17	33	▼3	
2018	105	▲7	35	▲2	
2019	113	▼8	34	▼1	
2020	104	▲9	36	▲2	
2021	115	▼11	34	▼2	
2022	116	▼1	33	▼1	
2023	126	▼10	31	▼2	
2024	130	▼4	30	▼1	
2025	120	▲10	32	▲2	
