= 2012–2014 Salvadoran gang truce =

Government truce with gangs in El Salvador

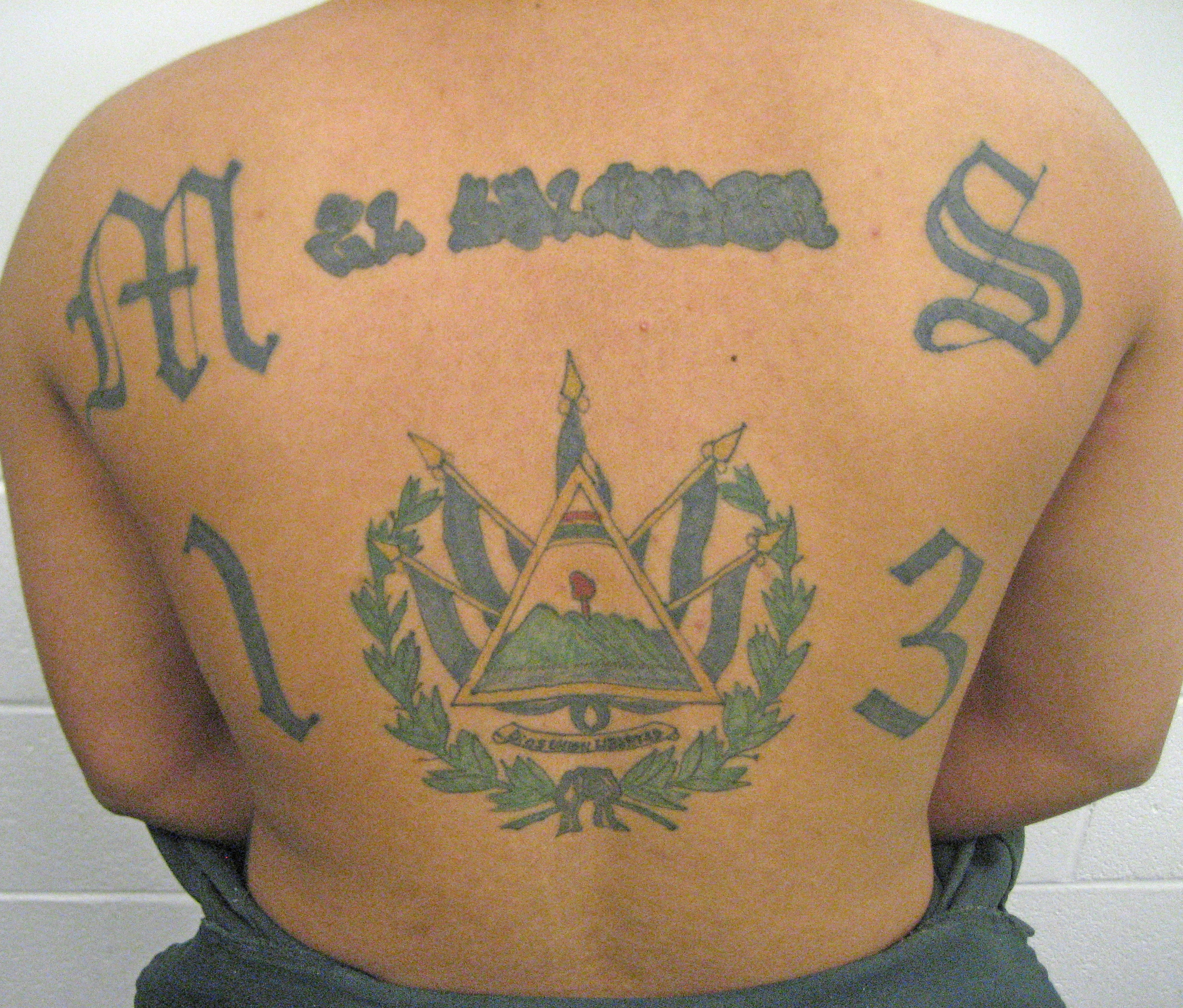
- A member of MS-13 with a tattoo displaying the gang's name and the El Salvador's coat of arms
- Native name: Tregua entre pandillas
- Date: 9 March 2012 – 26 May 2014
- Duration: 2 years and 78 days
- Location: El Salvador
- Type: Truce
- Organized by: Government of El Salvador; Catholic Church; Criminal gangs; Mara Salvatrucha; 18th Street gang
- Outcome: Truce faltered by May 2014: 2,576 homicides in 2012; 2,492 homicides in 2013; 3,912 homicides in 2014
- Convicted: Mauricio Funes (illicit association), 14 years imprisonment (Note: Tried and sentenced in absentia); David Munguía (illicit association), 18 years imprisonment
- Charges: Raúl Mijango (illicit association), acquitted in 2017 and 2019

From March 2012 to May 2014, the Salvadoran government, the Catholic Church, and the country's two largest criminal gangs — Mara Salvatrucha (MS-13) and the 18th Street gang (Barrio 18) — came to a truce, known in El Salvador simply as the Gang Truce (Spanish: tregua entre pandillas), to lower the country's rate of homicides and extortions in exchange for improved prison conditions and certain visitation privileges. The truce's principal negotiators were Minister of Public Security David Munguía Payés, former deputy Raúl Mijango, and Bishop Fabio Reynaldo Colindres Abarca, and the negotiations were overseen by President Mauricio Funes.

The existence of the truce was alleged by the online newspaper El Faro in early March 2012, after 30 gang leaders were transferred from a maximum-security prison to a lower-security prison, and confirmed after representatives from the gangs and the Catholic Church admitted that they negotiated a truce with the government. However, the government initially denied that they had negotiated with the gangs and that any truce existed; as the truce resulted in a decrease in crime, the government began to acknowledge its existence, but continued to attribute the decrease in crime to its security policies. The government formally recognized its role in negotiating the truce in September 2012.

Although fractures in the truce began to manifest in July and August 2012, in November 2012 an effort to establish "peace zones" in Salvadoran municipalities helped restore the truce and reaffirm the gangs' commitments to reduce their criminal activities. Although the gang surrendered its weapons and the government removed soldiers from the designated peace zones, the truce again began to break down in February 2013 following an increase in homicides; the truce continued to fall apart throughout 2013 as homicides continued to rise. In May 2014, as the homicide rate reached 14 per day, Funes stated that "the truce has failed".

The truce received criticism from journalists, religious figures, and politicians, who claimed that the truce gave the gangs political legitimacy, that it failed to produce any benefits for the population, and that it failed to solve the overall problem of gang violence in the country. Additionally, the truce became a major issue during the 2014 presidential election. In 2016, the gangs revealed that members of both the Nationalist Republican Alliance (ARENA) and the Farabundo Martí National Liberation Front (FMLN) secretly negotiated with the gangs prior to the election to persuade them to vote in the election.

The truce resulted in an overall decrease in homicides. The government recorded 2,576 homicides in 2012, a 41 percent decrease from the 4,371 homicides recorded in 2011; in 2013, the government recorded 2,492 homicides, a slight decrease from 2012. With the truce's collapse in mid-2014, homicides returned to pre-truce levels and the country recorded 3,912 homicides in 2014. The year after the truce ended, 2015, saw 6,657 homicides, the most since 1983 during the Salvadoran Civil War. In the years following the truce's collapse, several individuals have been arrested, charged, and ordered to stand trial regarding their involvement with the truce, including Funes, Munguía, and Mijango. In 2017 and 2019, Mijango was acquitted of all charges, while in 2023, Funes (in absentia) and Munguía were sentenced to 14 years and 18 years imprisonment, respectively, for their roles in the truce.

== Background ==
=== Criminal activity ===
Criminal gangs have been a major problem in El Salvador since the conclusion of the Salvadoran Civil War in 1992, being responsible for the majority of the crimes committed in the country. According to journalist C. Ramos, more violent deaths occurred in the 1990s than during the entirety of the twelve-year civil war. In 2004, there were an estimated 10,000 to 39,000 gang members in El Salvador; by 2012, the estimate was over 60,000. The country's two largest gangs are Mara Salvatrucha (MS-13) and the 18th Street gang (Barrio 18), and most of its members arrived in the country after being deported from the United States.

For most of its history, the country has faced high homicide rates in comparison to its neighboring countries. In the 1960s and 1970s, the rate was 30 homicides per 100,000 inhabitants; from 1994 to 1997, the rate was 80 homicides per 100,000 inhabitants. Other crimes committed by the gangs included making threats, robbery, motor-vehicle theft, arms trafficking, drug trafficking, extortion, rape, and kidnapping. According to Salvadoran President Antonio Saca of the Nationalist Republican Alliance (ARENA), over 50 percent of homicides in the country were committed by gang members, and the National Civil Police (PNC) estimated that the gangs committed over 60 percent of all crimes.

According to polling conducted by the Central American University (UCA) during the 2000s, 20.8 percent of Salvadorans believed that gangs were the main issue facing the country, 55 percent would support killing a criminal who terrorizes a community, and 40.5 would approve the lynching of a criminal.

=== La Mano Dura ===
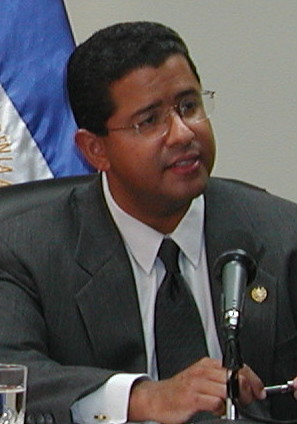
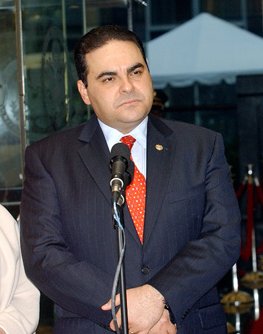
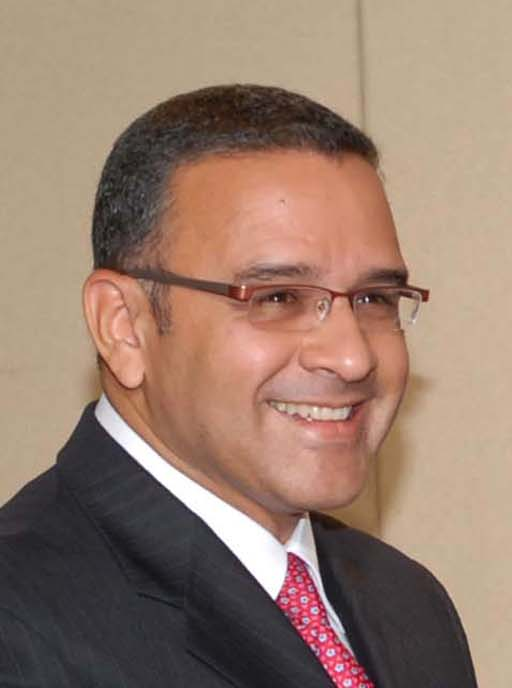
Presidents Francisco Flores (left), Antonio Saca (center), and Mauricio Funes (right) each implemented strict anti-gang policies during their presidencies.

In July 2003, Salvadoran President Francisco Flores Pérez of ARENA announced the implementation of La Mano Dura (Spanish for "The Iron Fist") security policy to combat the gangs and lower the country's homicide rate. Upon assuming office in June 2004, Saca increased the security policies of La Mano Dura, announcing that Super Mano Dura ("Super Iron Fist") would replace the original policy. The policies of La Mano Dura and Super Mano Dura included joint police and military patrols of gang-controlled areas, random searches of suspected gang members, and the ability to arrest individuals on appearance alone. As a result of both La Mano Dura and Super Mano Dura, around 4,000 gang members were arrested, leading to overcrowding in El Salvador's prisons.

Upon assuming office in June 2009, President Mauricio Funes of the Farabundo Martí National Liberation Front (FMLN) maintained some of the policies of Super Mano Dura. He ended mass raids of gang territory to instead focus on the police's investigation capacities. In September 2010, the Legislative Assembly passed the Gang Prohibition Act in response to an increase in gang violence. The law doubled the maximum prison sentence for minors, allowed authorities to freeze bank accounts and seize assets of gang members, and made gang membership illegal. In February 2012, Funes implemented new anti-gang policies to increase the militarization of the police and a proposed curfew to prevent gang members from being in the streets at night. The policies resulted in an increase of homicides, however, and the government blamed the increase on "backlash" from the gangs against the policies.

== Truce ==
=== Beginning of the truce ===
On 9 March 2012, 30 gang leaders of MS-13 and Barrio 18 were moved from the Zacatecoluca maximum-security prison to lower-security prisons with "more relaxed rules on visitors". On 11 March, the online newspaper El Faro suggested that the Salvadoran government had been secretly negotiating with MS-13 and Barrio 18 in an effort to reduce the country's homicide rate. The following day, 12 March, was reportedly "the least violent day the country has seen in three years" when only two people were killed.

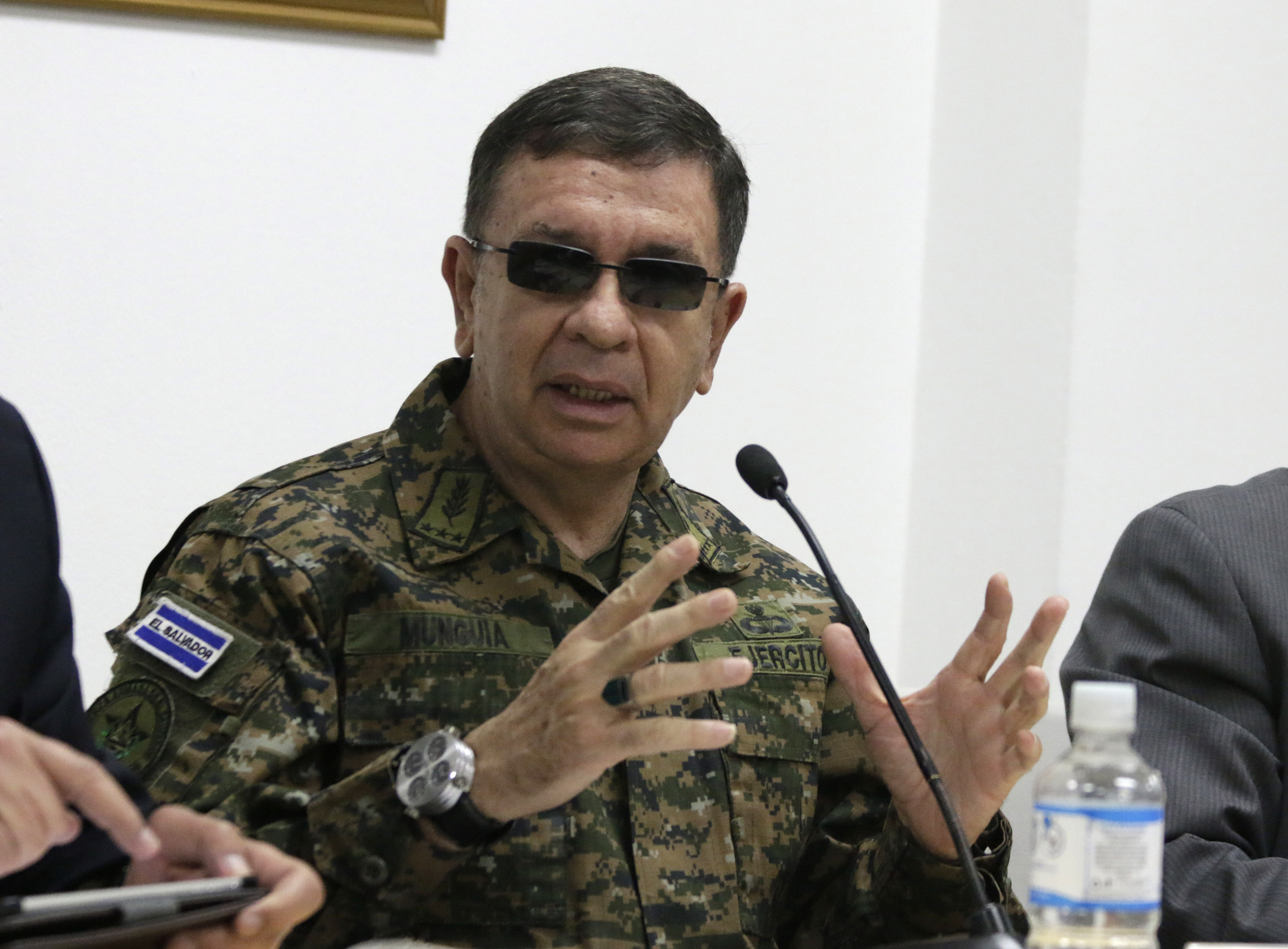
David Munguía Payés in 2015.

On 21 March 2012, Bishop Fabio Reynaldo Colindres Abarca claimed that the Catholic Church helped mediate a truce between MS-13 and Barrio 18 to end "deadly attacks". He stated that the government had not given the gangs any concessions and that the gangs contacted him to mediate in the truce's negotiations. Raúl Mijango, a former deputy of the Legislative Assembly, stated that he helped mediate the truce and that the government was fully aware of the truce. Representatives of both MS-13 and Barrio 18 confirmed that a truce between them and the government existed.

The Salvadoran government denied negotiating a deal with the gangs to decrease homicide rates in exchange for better prison conditions. In a press conference, Funes denied that the government ever held negotiations with the gangs, stating "the government did not sit down to negotiate with gangs". He did, however, state that the government supported the agreement between the gangs and the Church. He added that the transfer of prisoners was "not illegal" and that those being transferred did not receive "preferential treatment" at their new prison. Minister of Public Security David Munguía Payés also denied the allegations, saying "I want the following statement to be loud and clear [...] the government of the republic is not at any time negotiating with any gang". He said that the prisoners were moved because of the Church's appeals on humanitarian grounds, that they were attempting to escape from the prisons, and that they had already served their required ten-year sentence in a maximum-security prison. Police officials denied the allegations of a truce, claiming that the reduce in homicides were a result of "improved coordination and intelligence".

=== Continued negotiations ===
In April 2012, the Church announced that it was continuing further negotiations with the gangs to reduce extortion. Munguía stated that the government was willing to facilitate the negotiations but not participate in them, saying that "the government cannot sit down to negotiate with criminal groups". He also stated that any concessions from the government would be "within the scope of the law", such as allowing gang members to be visited by their children and increasing the allowed time for visitations. He added, however, that the government was ready to return to stricter anti-gang measures if the negotiations collapsed.

After the truce's first month, Munguía acknowledged that it existed, saying "I think that this pact between gangs still has not yet been totally fulfilled, and I think it will be difficult to fulfill to perfection [...] there are also other gangs who haven't agreed to the pact, and there are still internal problems inside these gangs". Nevertheless, he claimed that the decrease in violence was a result of improved police operations and better government security strategy. In mid-April 2012, the government announced a plan to allow tens of thousands of imprisoned gang members to find employment opportunities after being released; the plan was expected to cost around US$20 million. Despite the announcement, the government stated that it was difficult to find companies who were willing to participate.

In early May 2012, the gangs agreed to extend the truce to school zones and said that they would end the forced recruitment of members. The announcement, presented by Víctor Antonio García Cerón, a leader of Barrio 18, at the Quezaltepeque prison, read:

We have considered making a second gesture of good faith, which consists of declaring all scholarly centers of the country, public and private, as zones of peace; that is to say, they are no longer to be considered disputed territories, which will permit the students and teachers to carry on with their educational activities with all normality, and the families of the students will be liberated of all worry when they send their children to school... We also declare that henceforth, all involuntary recruitment of adults and children into our ranks will cease.

=== Fracturing in late 2012 ===
In mid-July 2012, the government arrested 185 gang members in San Salvador as a part of a "mega-operation" intended to capture 200 gang members. Additionally, three gang leaders were arrested in Soyapango who were connected to the assassinations of three police officers three months prior. In August 2012, Munguía stated that the police were arresting an average of 250 people per day, but announced that the police would begin reducing the number of arrests. He denied the reduction was in response to demands from the gangs.

According to Miguel Fortin, the director of the Institute of Forensic Medicine (IML), the truce began to fracture in August 2012 as homicide rates began to steadily increase, with 58 homicides being recorded in the first week of the month. On 20 August 2012, two leaders of MS-13 were killed in Soyapango by lower-ranking members, supposedly due to the two leaders attempting to undermine the truce.

In September 2012, the Salvadoran government formally acknowledged its role in organizing the truce, stating that the Ministry of Public Security directly negotiated with the gangs under the oversight of Funes. According to Mijango, some of the gangs' demands included the repeal of the Gang Prohibition Act, the end of police operations in gang-controlled territory, the repeal of a law which provided benefits to individuals in exchange for information about others with criminal connections, and general improvements in the prisoners' quality of life. In November 2012, Mijango and Colindres called upon the Legislative Assembly to repeal the Gang Prohibition Act to further distance the country from the old Mano Dura policies, but Funes stated that he would oppose any effort to repeal the law.

=== Peace zones ===
On 22 November 2012, Mijango and Colindres announced that the next phase of the truce would be the implementation of so-called "peace zones", special municipalities where the gangs should aim to eliminate all criminal activities. Gang members would be required to surrender their weapons and make peace with rival gang members, while the police would end night-time operations and the government would implement programs to support gang members by providing them work. Some gang leaders accepted the proposal and even proposed ten municipalities where the peace should be established. The peace zones would affect around 900,000 people.

The peace zone project formally began on 22 January 2013 in the city of Ilopango. Quezaltepeque, Santa Tecla, and Sonsonate became peace zones soon after. Additionally, Minister of Defense Atilio Benítez announced that the military would withdraw its forces from the peace zones after confirming that MS-13 and Barrio 18 were surrendering their weapons and ceasing criminal activities. By May 2013, the country had 19 peace zones.

=== Further fracturing in 2013 ===
Homicides once again began to increase in February 2013, rising from 5.3 homicides per day at the end of 2012 to 6.6 homicides per day in mid-February 2013. A shootout between rival gang members occurred in San Miguel on 1 February resulting in four deaths, and in mid-February, three homicides occurred in Ilopango despite the city being a peace zone. Munguía described the shootout in San Miguel as "a chain of revenge" and denied that the homicides in Ilopango undermined the truce, stating that they were committed by a gang which was not involved in the deal.

In March 2013, Salvadoran authorities admitted that the truce was not working in some parts of the country, and that the gangs were unable to enforce some cliques of members to abide by it, especially in La Unión. According to Munguía, the mayor and police chief of La Unión stated that the truce was not in force in the city with 31 homicides being recorded since the start of the year. In April 2013, Salvadoran officials requested financial assistance from the United States to fund the truce, which they estimated as requiring US$150 million. In June 2013, the US announced that it would spend US$91.2 million to fund El Salvador's security programs, but not the truce. In regards to the US, Mijango stated that "the US has not only decided to maintain their distance, they have begun a strong campaign to try to destroy this process".

Mauricio Ramírez, the sub-director of the PNC, stated that some arrested gang members have argued that they should not be arrested because they were participating in the truce. Despite the gangs' opposition to the Gang Prohibition Act, Salvadoran prosecutors revealed in May 2013 that they had been using the law to convict 180 gang members during ten of the thirteen months in which the truce was present, following a freedom of information request by the Salvadoran Foundation for Economic and Social Development (FUSADES).

Following a spike of homicides in early May 2013, Munguía claimed that the homicides did not represent a trend. Despite comments and statements from the Church and politicians claiming that the truce has failed, Funes reiterated that "the truce has not failed" and stated that US$18 million would be invested in creating programs in the country's peace zones to continue to offer support and opportunities to gang members. Munguía was ousted as minister of public security on 17 May 2013 following a ruling from the Supreme Court of Justice of El Salvador which stated that his appointment to the position as a former military general was unconstitutional. Mijango criticized the ruling, claiming that it was "influenced by enemies of the peace process", while gang members lamented his removal, stating that it "puts the security of Salvadorans at risk". Funes stated that, although he opposed the court's ruling, he would respect the decision.

=== Collapse ===
In July 2013, an anonymous police chief told the La Prensa Gráfica newspaper that the gangs were preparing to end the truce and that they were using it stockpile weapons, acquire vehicles, and diversify their means of obtaining revenue. Additionally, Ricardo Perdomo, who succeeded Munguía as minister of public security, told La Prensa Gráfica that the gangs also used the truce to strengthen their connections with international drug traffickers. An analysis of around 500 weapons surrendered by the gangs revealed the majority of them to be non-functional, raising concerns over the validity of the truce.

Four members of Barrio 18 were killed in Ilopango, the first peace zone, on 6 September 2013. In late September 2013, gang leaders issued a joint statement announcing their desire to continue the truce despite September being the fourth consecutive month of increasing homicides. They described their desire to continue the truce as "unbreakable". In November 2013, eight mayors of the country's peace zones stated that the truce was failing, while Mijango stated that the gangs were the only ones putting effort into maintaining the truce.

On 21 November 2013, Perdomo stated that the truce was "all but dead" and that the gangs "are at war, in a process of vengeance and territorial control". He began to distance the government from the truce, stating "I have never mentioned a truce. [The gangs] decide the details of the truce, only they know how things are. We, the authorities, do not get involved in this; we restrict ourselves to enforcing the law and stopping violence". Perdomo also believed that the gangs planned to increase homicides in December 2012, which the gangs denied as they accused the government of wanting to return to the old Mano Dura policies.

On 3 March 2014, with 484 homicides being recorded between 1 January and 1 March 2014 (or 8 homicides per day), and with 60 to 70 percent of them being committed by gang members, Rigoberto Pleités, the director of the National Civil Police, announced that "the truce technically no longer exists, given the increase in homicides in the past months". On 26 May 2014, four days before the end of his term as president, Funes stated that Barrio 18 had "decided to break the truce". Funes admitted that "the truce has failed, not only because of the decision of those who agreed to it; it is because a state of opinion contrary to it was created; with this, I am not saying that the truce was necessary or the only option". The country at this time averaged 14 homicides per day.

== Criticism ==
=== Journalists ===
Shortly after the truce was announced, Elyssa Pachico and Steven Dudley, two writers for InSight Crime, stated that the gang truce set a "dangerous regional precedent". They stated that truces only lead to a temporary decrease in violence and are difficult to maintain or transform into a long-term solution. They added that the truce emboldened the gangs' political power and that they "may seek to further upset the delicate balance between justice and peace by demanding more concessions [...] this balance may have already tilted too far in the favor [of the] gangs". Others have stated that the truce gave gangs political leverage.

In March 2013, El Faro writer José Luis Sanz criticized the truce as violating the Anti-Gang Law, as any negotiations or dealings with gangs violates the law. He also added that 22 mayors across the country have contracted gang members to carry out public works projects, such as resurfacing paved roads, which he argued also violated the law.

=== Religious figures ===
On 6 March 2013, Spanish priest Antonio Rodríguez claimed that one of his colleagues, Édgar Giovanni Morales, was assassinated by members of Barrio 18. Rodríguez claimed that Morales was assassinated in retaliation for Rodríguez's opposition to the gang truce, and claimed that the truce benefited the gangs while they continued to participate in criminal activities. He later changed his position and supported the truce. According to Mijango, who met Rodríguez shortly after he made his claim, Rodríguez changed his view in part due to fear after Morales' death.

Despite Colindres' role in forming the truce, three of the Church's top leaders informed the government that they did not want anything to do with the truce. The country's Catholic Conference of Bishops issued a statement on 12 May 2013 questioning the effectiveness of the truce, seeking to distance themselves from Colindres, stating that "the truce has not produced any benefits for the honorable and hard-working population". Additionally, many lower ranking Church officials also opposed the truce. According to Colindres himself, he participated in the truce's negotiation without consulting the conference and that he was motivated by the Church's humanitarian imperative. Munguía and Mijango believed that Colindres' participation would help legitimize the truce.

In April 2012, José Luis Escobar Alas, the archbishop of San Salvador, praised Colindres' efforts in forming the truce and called upon Salvadorans to take advantage of the situation to "surpass the intolerable violence", but as the truce was collapsing in March 2014, he stated that the truce was "well intentioned, but did not work".

=== Politicians ===
Ernesto Muyshondt, a spokesman for the Nationalist Republican Alliance, stated following the announcement of the truce that he might call for an investigation hearing against Munguía, stating that making deals with the gangs would be "a nefarious precedent [...] the government would be offering itself to extortionists".

On 8 May 2013, Attorney General Luis Martínez criticized the truce as "hypocritical". He stated that "this false truce does not really exist, because every day it is demonstrated that there continue to be victims in our country, of working people, of fighting people, not of these lazy gang members who only dedicate themselves to stealing, extorting, and murder". In June 2013, he accused Munguía of suspending fourteen anti-gang operations in San Salvador and leaking information to gang members in October 2012 to help them avoid arrest. He has also referred to the peace zones as "pandillalandia" (literally "gang land").

In July 2013, deputy Guillermo Gallegos of the Grand Alliance for National Unity (GANA) called for an investigation into Mijango's activities after he claimed on 4 July 2013 that the number of homicides would decrease in 72 hours following a significant spike in homicides in the first three days of July. Gallegos claimed that "a person who has knowledge, control, and knows how the gangs act, and says that in 72 hours homicides may drop is also in some way an accomplice". Another politician commented that Mijango appeared to have information regarding the truce which was not available to others. Mijango refuted their claims and stated that the homicides were not part of a plan to blackmail the government.

==== 2014 presidential election ====
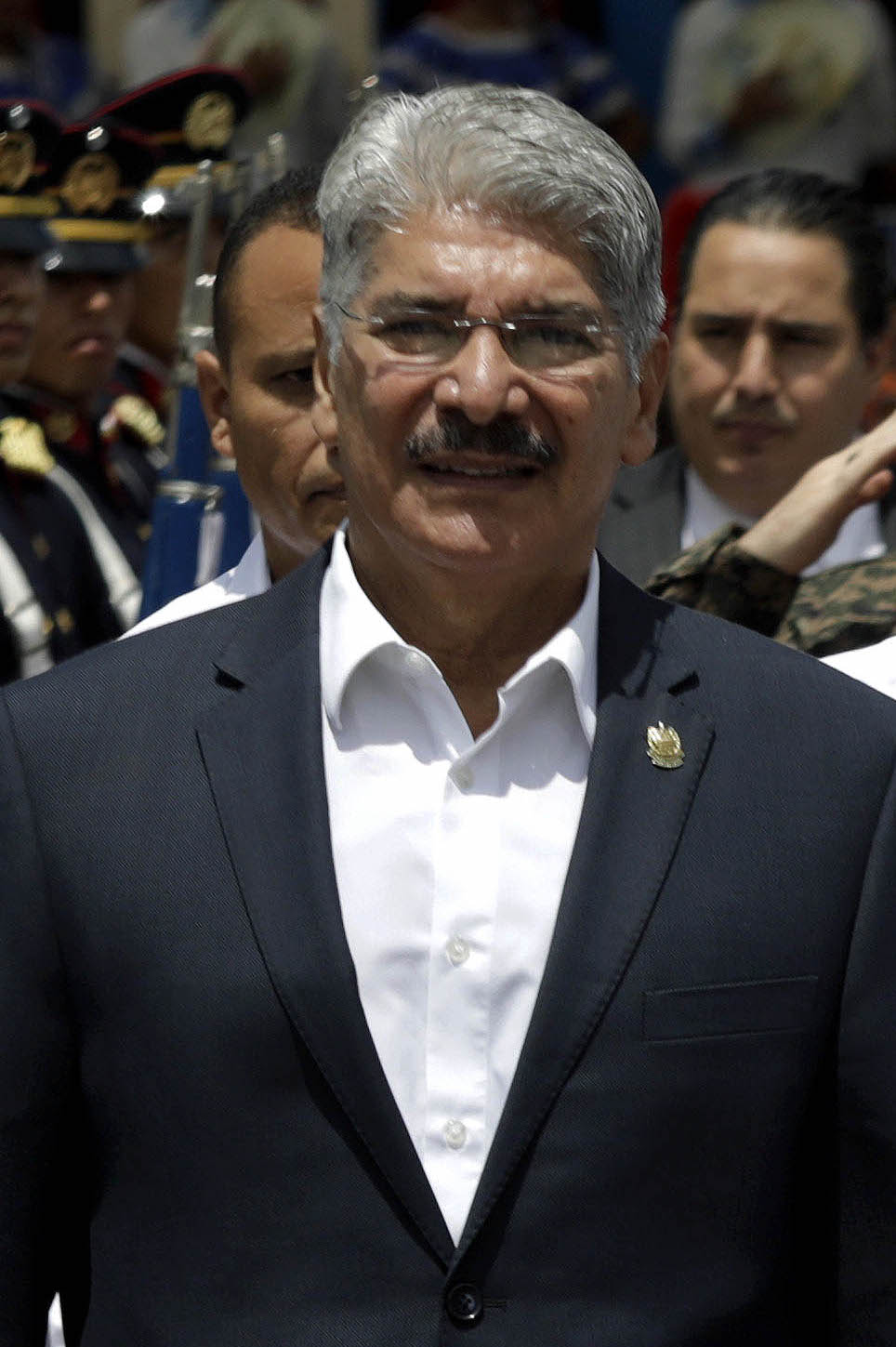
2014 ARENA presidential candidate Norman Quijano criticized the truce throughout his electoral campaign.

The truce became a major topic in the 2014 presidential election. FMLN presidential candidate Salvador Sánchez Cerén criticized the truce, and claimed that his party was never the reason that the truce was formed. Funes continued to defend the truce and expressed his support for it. Perdomo stated that the government would continue supporting the truce, but questioned its effectiveness claiming that it allowed the gangs to strengthen their connections with international drug traffickers. Meanwhile, ARENA presidential candidate Norman Quijano criticized the truce. He claimed that it "did not solve the problem" of violence and that it only served to legitimize the gangs through the government's cooperation with them.

Mijango dismissed Quijano's comments, claiming that they were only for show for his presidential campaign, adding that "it would be stupid to end the possibility that this process keeps advancing". He also stated that while Funes' government was supporting the truce, it was also "creat[ing] more obstacles" to the truce being effective. He believed that the country's political climate was not enough to break the truce; he added, "I told [the gang members] that it's necessary to wait until after the elections, so that [the election], where everyone is so frenzied, passes". He asked the gangs to "stay out of politics"; "we have an agreement that no one in the gangs is even going to wear a party shirt nor form any part of the party structures".

In September 2013, gang leaders announced they would vote in the 2014 election and that they encouraged other gang members to do the same. In October 2013, Mijango claimed that both Quijano and representatives from the FMLN had met with leaders of both MS-13 and Barrio 18 in an effort to rally the gangs' support for the election. He stated that the gangs constitute "an elector that can define the result [of the election]", and referenced the 60,000 gang members that can be mobilized to vote and sway the election. He described Quijano as a hypocrite for allegedly meeting with the gangs while publicly voicing his opposition to the truce.

According to Roberto José d'Aubuisson Munguía, a deputy of the Legislative Assembly from ARENA, recordings and documents leaked in January 2014 allegedly revealed that the government authorized payments to the mediators and the families of gang leaders, as well as gave benefits to incarcerated gang leaders such as nights out of prison, prostitutes, and luxury goods. In 2016, MS-13 released YouTube videos and audio recordings which allegedly showed politicians of both ARENA and the FMLN negotiating with gangs, offering them identity cards and financial support in exchange for the gangs supporting their political campaigns prior to the 2014 presidential election. On 4 June 2021, Muyshondt was arrested for allegedly engaging in electoral fraud and negotiating with the gangs to vote for ARENA in 2014. On 11 November 2022, Quijano himself was ordered to stand trial for allegedly offering the gangs favors in exchange for them voting for him in the 2014 election.

=== Public opinion ===
According to a poll conducted by the Technological University of El Salvador in August 2013, 47 percent of respondents believed the truce benefited the gangs, 16 percent believed it benefited the public, and 13 percent believed it benefited the government. The poll also found that 68.1 percent of respondents believed the truce had "political ends" and 50 percent believed that the truce had not produced any results.

== Results ==
=== Homicide rate ===
In the first 21 days of March 2012, a total of 186 homicides were recorded (or 5 homicides per day), a decrease from 402 in February 2012 and 411 in January 2012 (or 14 homicides per day). Although the number of homicides significantly decreased in March 2012, the gangs were still responsible for about half of the homicides committed; according to La Prensa Gráfica, from 10 March to 11 April, a total of 209 homicides were recorded. By May 2012, homicides had reportedly decreased by 58 percent from the beginning the truce. On 3 January 2013, the government announced that it had registered 2,576 homicides throughout 2012, a decrease of 1,795 (or 41 percent) from 2011, when 4,371 were killed. Additionally, a few days without a homicide were reported in 2012, something which had not occurred in El Salvador in over thirty years.

From January 2013 to April 2013, the government recorded 694 homicides, a 45 percent decrease from the 1,224 homicides recorded in the same period in 2012. The figures did not include the number of people recorded missing. In the first eight days of May 2013, however, a spike of 65 homicides was registered which seemed to be gang related, and the homicide rate continued to steadily increase throughout May and June 2013. In the first three days of July 2013, 56 homicides were registered. In the first six days of August 2013, 69 homicides were registered, with 29 of them being linked to gang violence; by late August, 208 homicides were registered in the month, a 45 percent increase from August 2012. A total of 176 homicides were registered in the first 17 days of November 2013, compared to only 91 homicides recorded in the same period in November 2012. According to the Institute of Forensic Medicine (IML), the Salvadoran government forensic institute, a total of 2,492 homicides were registered in 2013, a 4 percent decrease from 2012 for an average of 7.1 homicides per day. By the end of the truce in May 2014, the country was experiencing an average of 14 homicides per day. El Salvador recorded 3,912 homicides in 2014.

The following graph visualizes the number of homicides recorded in the three calendar years the truce was in force.

Raw data

=== Other crimes ===
Although the number of homicides recorded decreased during the truce, the number of missing persons increased. In the first two months of 2012, 99 people were reported missing, while in the same period in 2013, 150 were reported missing. Meanwhile, the police reported an 81 percent increase in the number of bodies found in shallow graves, with all 20 discovered bodies having been killed in 2012 or 2013. By August 2013, the country registered 949 disappearances; 49 percent were later found alive, 6 percent were later found to have been killed, and the remainder were still missing. A total of 97 bodies were recovered from shallow graves between August 2012 and August 2013.

Despite the decrease in homicides, extortions increased during the first month of the truce. According to gang member Ludwing Alexander Rivera, extortion would continue until the gangs and their families could make up for the lost revenue from ending the practice. By July 2012, gang-related extortion reportedly began to decrease, but anonymous extortion was increasing. According to some gang members, they were ordered to not murder or extort people in their territories as to not raise attention but that they were free to do so elsewhere.

=== Interest in Guatemala and Honduras ===
In May 2012, government officials in Guatemala and Honduras announced that they might consider implementing similar agreements with gangs in their countries to reduce crime, seeing the results of the truce in El Salvador. Héctor Mauricio López, the minister of the interior of Guatemala, stated that the truce was "very innovative" and "worthy of being studied". Pompeyo Bonilla, the minister of security of Honduras, stated that the truce was "a lesson which deserves to be replicated, to attempt it in my country, where we regrettably have the highest homicide rate".

In May 2013, gang leaders in Honduras called upon President Porfirio Lobo Sosa to agree to a similar truce as was met in El Salvador. Adam Blackwell, a representative of the Organization of American States (OAS), and Romulo Emiliani, a bishop of the Catholic Church, were present at a prison in San Pedro Sula when the gangs formally announced that they were committed to ending gang-related violence. Lobo Sosa stated he was willing to support the truce, but Emiliani believed that the truce would not result in a decrease in violence as seen in El Salvador.

== Aftermath ==
=== Subsequent homicides ===
According to the Institute of Forensic Medicine (IML), a total of 1,857 homicides were recorded in the first six months of 2014, a 77 percent increase from the same period in 2013 for an average of 10.3 homicides per day. In June 2014 alone, 378 homicides were recorded; with June's daily average of 12.6 homicides per day, the country effectively returned to its pre-truce homicide rate. By 24 July 2014, the country recorded 2,098 homicides throughout the year; Mauricio Ramírez Landaverde, the director of the National Civil Police, stated that gang members were responsible for the majority of the homicides, but were also the majority of homicide victims. The country recorded 3,912 homicides in 2014, an average of 10.8 homicides per day.

In February 2015, as crime began to "skyrocket" in El Salvador, Ricardo Salvador Martínez, the director of police internal affairs, stated that "we're at war" with the gangs. March 2015 marked the deadliest month in El Salvador since the end of the civil war in 1992 with 481 homicides being committed. This mark was later surpassed with 622 homicides in May 2015, then 677 homicides in June 2015, and 907 homicides in August 2015. On 25 August 2015, the Supreme Court declared that both MS-13 and Barrio 18 were officially designated as terrorist organizations, stating that they were responsible for "systematic attacks on the lives, security, and personal integrity of the population". Throughout 2015, the government recorded 6,657 homicides, the most the country had seen in a single year since 1983 for a homicide rate of 104 per 100,000 people. Additionally, the rise in homicides in 2014 and 2015 led to the revival of the Sombra Negra, a vigilante death squad with supposed police connections which targeted and killed gang members. Due to the sharp rise in homicides in 2015, El Salvador was frequently referred to as the "world's deadliest peacetime country".

=== Legal proceedings ===
==== Mauricio Funes ====
In February 2016, the office of the Attorney General leaked recordings from gang members who alleged that Funes' government gave money, conjugal visits, and transfers to lower-security prisons to gang leaders in exchange for their participation in the truce. Funes denied that his government ever gave perks to gang leaders, stating "the only thing the government did was monitor this agreement through the mediators". He also questioned the validity of the allegations, claiming that as the allegations came from gang members, they were only seeking to shorten their sentences in exchange for making allegations against Funes.

Funes left the country in June 2016 and travelled to Nicaragua; he claimed to have left because he was working as a consultant. In August 2016, his properties were raided by Salvadoran authorities who were searching for evidence to charge Funes with charges of embezzlement, illicit negotiations, misuse of funds, illicit enrichment, and influence-trafficking. In September 2016, he and his family were granted asylum by the Nicaraguan government, which said the reason for granting him asylum was a result of Funes "fighting in favor of democracy, peace, justice and human rights". Funes denied all the allegations against him, stating, "asylum only seeks to guarantee protection from persecution [...] I have not given up on confronting the judicial process nor proving my innocence".

On 12 June 2018, Attorney General Jorge Cortéz requested Funes' extradition to El Salvador to stand trial for money laundering charges unrelated to the truce. On 21 March 2019, all 15 magistrates of the Supreme Court approved a request from the attorney general to request Funes' extradition to El Salvador to stand trial for embezzlement charges unrelated to the truce. On 26 July 2020, Attorney General Raúl Melara announced that he would issue an arrest warrant for Funes for his role in forming the truce. In response to Melara's announcement, Funes said on Twitter:

Los fiscales dejan mucho que desear. Hoy resulta que me acusan de los delitos de negociaciones ilícitas y de incumplimiento de deberes por haber sido "facilitador" de la tregua. Entonces con quién negocié y qué dejé de hacer? Para que haya una asociación o negociación ilícita debí haberme asociado con alquién para delinquir. Con quién? La FGR no lo dice. Y para incumplir mis deberes debí haber faltado a mis responsabilidades como Presidente. Qué obligaciones dejé de cumplir en el caso tregua? Estos fiscales deben regresar a la Universidad y el Fiscal General debe dejar de seguir la agenda de la Embajada USA y de la derecha oligárquica. Cada día se desprestigia más.

The prosecutors leave a lot to be desired. Today, it turns out that they accuse me of the crimes of illegal negotiations and breach of duty for having been a "facilitator" of the truce. So who did I negotiate with and what did I stop doing? For there to be an illicit association or negotiation, I should have associated with whom to commit a crime. With who? The Attorney General does not say. And to fail in my duties, I should have failed in my responsibilities as President. What obligations did I stop fulfilling in the truce case? These prosecutors must return to university, and the Attorney General must stop following the agenda of the U.S. Embassy and the oligarchic right. Every day, it loses more prestige.

On 30 November 2022, Attorney General Rodolfo Delgado ordered Funes to stand trial for his role in organizing the truce. He stated that Funes allegedly "granted benefits to gang members who were in prison" and engaged in illicit association with the gangs. Prior to Delgado's order, Funes tweeted that any legal proceedings carried out in his absence would be "illegal".

On 26 April 2023, a criminal trial against Funes, who was tried in absentia, began; he was charged with illicit association and failure to perform his duties. Funes denied his role in truce, writing on Twitter the day before the trial began that he "never ordered nor authorized any negotiation". During the trial, a former high ranking government employee only referred to as "Franco" testified that Funes secretly authorized US$50,000 from the country's reserve fund to be transferred in cash to "necessary sources" ("fuentes necesarias") to those who collaborated in the truce. The attorney general solicited 16 years imprisonment for Funes. On 29 May 2023, Funes was sentenced to 14 years imprisonment—8 for illicit association and 6 for failure to perform his duties—making him the second former president in Salvadoran history to be sentenced to prison after Saca was sentenced to 10 years imprisonment in 2018 for embezzling US$300 million. Following his sentencing, he stated that "the sentence, insofar as it refers to me, is illegal, doesn't have legal foundation", claiming that the government failed to prove the charges against him.

==== Truce negotiators ====
On 3 May 2016, Attorney General Douglas Meléndez began ordering the arrests of law enforcement officials who were responsible for helping carry out the truce. That month, Mijango and 20 law enforcement officials were arrested and charged with illicit association with gang members. He stated that he would seek to impeach Perdomo and have the Legislative Assembly remove Munguía's immunity from prosecution, as he had since been appointed as the country's minister of defense by Sánchez Cerén.

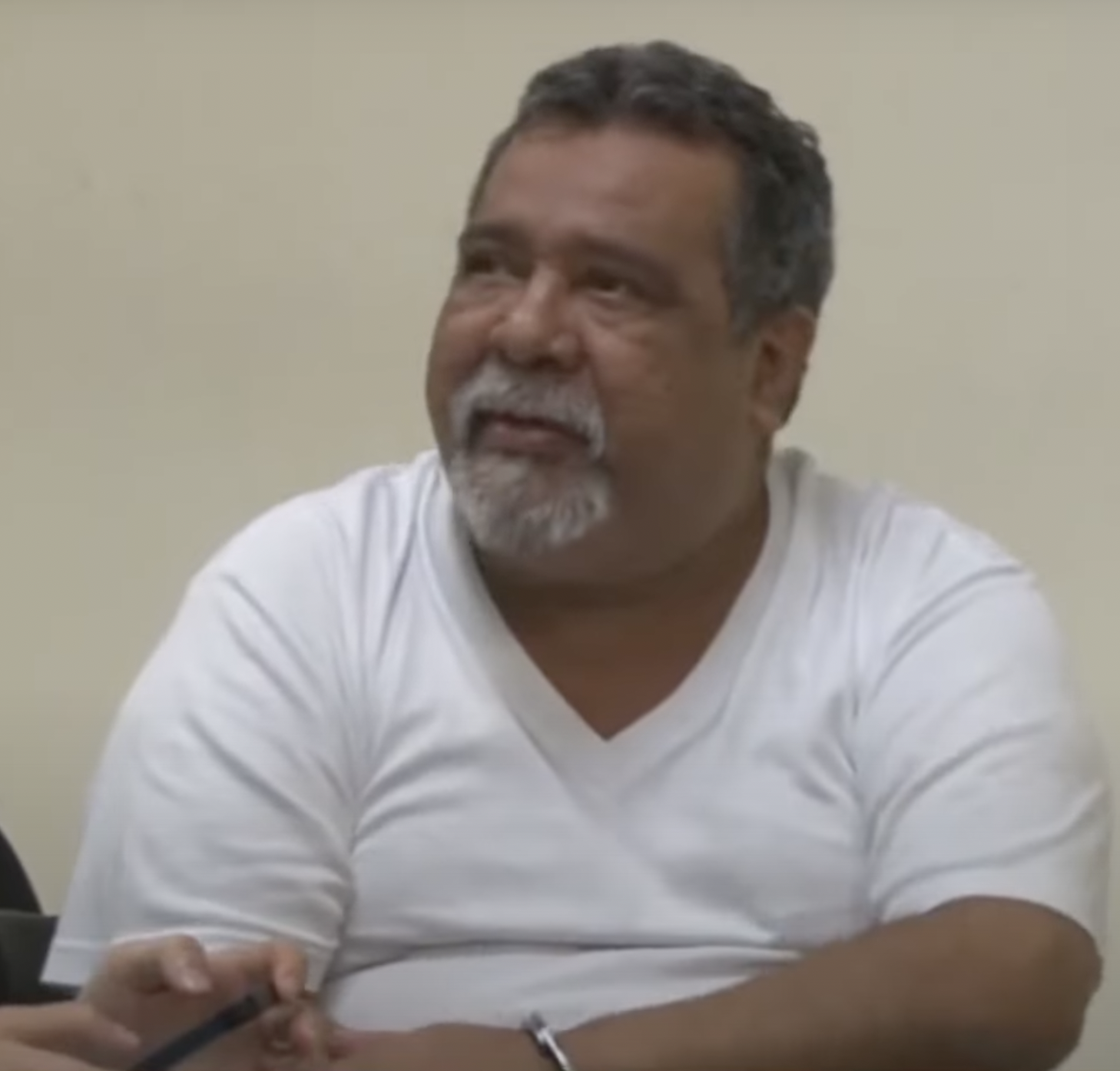
Mijango in 2023.

After his arrest Mijango stated, "there was a peace process [...] it pains me that those who are being judged are people who only wanted to contribute to a solution to a problem that is the most serious in the country". Blackwell criticized the arrests being made, stating, "it's all political, there is no logic or rational reason for this [...] [Meléndez is] playing into the hands of the political discussion: 'more police, less crime, eliminating the scourge and the more we kill, the better,' [...] that unfortunately is more popular than building community centers and community policing and focused deterrence as a strategy". Mijango stood trial in August 2017 in the so-called "Truce Trial" but was acquitted as the court ruled that he was "merely following orders". He was acquitted for a second time in May 2019 after prosecutors appealed the case. He was, however, sentenced to 13 years imprisonment in 2018 for conspiring with gang members to extort a food production and distribution company. Mijango died on 28 August 2023 while imprisoned.

On 23 July 2020, Munguía was arrested for his role in organizing the truce. He was charged with illicit association with gangs, abuse of authority, and non-compliance. Munguía's lawyer argued that "there had not been sufficient evidence to make the arrest". After his arrest, Munguía stated that he "knew of this process for three years" but "did not escape". Munguía's criminal trial began on 26 April 2023, being charged with illicit negotiation and failure to perform his duties. He faces up to eleven years imprisonment if convicted. The attorney general solicited twenty years imprisonment for Munguía. On 29 May 2023, Munguía was sentenced to 18 years imprisonment—8 years for illicit association, 6 years for failure to perform his duties, and 4 years for committing arbitrary actions. Munguía claimed that there were irregularities present during his trial. He added that he believed his sentencing was "a political condemnation" ("un condenado político") and that he considers himself to be a political prisoner. Funes stated that Munguía's sentence seemed "unjust" to him.

Colindres had not been arrested or charged for his role in negotiating the truce. He presented testimony against both Funes and Munguía during their criminal trial in May 2023.

==== Other individuals ====
In August 2017, a criminal trial known as the "Truce Trial" was held for eighteen of the truce's organizers, who were charged with criminal conspiracy and smuggling prohibited items into prisons. The trial's presiding judge was Godofredo Salazar. Among those on trial were Mijango; Nelson Rauda, the director of the prison system; Anílber Rodríguez, the inspector general of the prison system; and Juan Roberto Castillo, a deputy inspector with the National Civil Police. Colindres and Munguía presented testimony against the defendants, with Munguía testifying that "the truce between gangs was a state policy". Carlos Eduardo Burgos Nuila, a former member of Barrio 18, also testified against the defendants. All 18 defendants were acquitted on 29 August 2017. Salazar stated that the attorney general failed to prove that the defendants acted deliberately, and stated that they were "following their duties as state officials" and "merely following orders". He instead stated that Funes and Munguía were responsible for the truce. The prosecutors appealed the decision to a higher court. The defendants were again acquitted on 31 May 2019.

On 29 July 2014, Rodríguez was arrested and charged with bringing illegal objects into the country's prisons, including drugs, money, and cell phones; illicit association with gangs; and influencing trafficking. As a result of his actions, he allegedly "helped gang members continue committing crimes". Following a series of protests against his arrest, Rodríguez was granted "conditional liberty" on 4 August while his legal proceedings continued, but a judge ordered him to return to prison on 6 August. Martínez stated that he would "reveal the truth" of the truce and believed that Rodríguez's arrest would "mark the beginning of revelations of illegality in the truce process". Rodríguez was convicted on 4 September 2014 for bringing cell phones and SIM cards to prisoners and for asking prison authorities to lower the strength of prison phone signal jammers. He was sentenced to serve 30 months in prison, but was released the same day and deported to Spain under the condition that he does not communicate with gangs and does not visit the country's prisons.

== Subsequent revival attempts ==
=== 2014 and 2015 ===
In August 2014, the leaders of five gangs—Mara Salvatrucha, 18th Street gang, Mao Mao, Maquina, and Miranda Locos 13—offered to relaunch the truce, promising to avoid "civilian attacks". The gangs described their offer as a "second chance for the country to achieve peace", but Sánchez Cerén rejected the gangs' appeal, stating that he was developing his own strategy to reduce crime. In November 2014, Martínez stated that the government would not enter any talks with the gangs for another truce.

On 17 January 2015, the gang leaders which were moved out of the Zacatecoluca maximum-security prison at the beginning of the truce were returned to Zacatecoluca. That same day, MS-13 and Barrio 18 announced that they had agreed to a new truce without asking for concessions from the government. Five days later, El Salvador reported a day without a murder. In April 2015, spokespeople for MS-13, Barrio 18, Mao Mao, and Mirada Locos 13 announced that they would "[give] instructions for our units to stand down" and work towards "satisfactorily responding to what society hopes of us: less murders, less extortion; and definitely: less violence". They described it as a "gesture of goodwill" and "a gift to Monsignor Romero". Gang leaders sent a letter to the Salvadoran government in June 2015 calling for them to reinstate the truce, a letter which the government dismissed.

=== Alleged negotiations under Nayib Bukele ===
In September 2020, El Faro alleged that President Nayib Bukele had entered secret negotiations with MS-13 and Barrio 18 to reduce the country's homicide rate, similar to the allegations they presented against Funes in March 2012. El Faro alleged that the government promised to repeal laws and relax security in prisons in exchange for the gangs supporting Nuevas Ideas (NI), Bukele's political party, in the 2021 legislative election to bring them to power. Bukele denied the allegations, tweeting, "they accuse us of violating the terrorists' human rights. Now they say we give them privileges? Show me a privilege. Only one" and posted images of gang members in cramped conditions from a prison lockdown from April 2020. In another tweet, he stated, "Are they not themselves the ones who have been DENOUNCING US for our treatment of terrorists? 'Someone' is passing them false information". Melara stated that he would investigate the allegations made against the government but he was removed by the Legislative Assembly in May 2021. In December 2021, the United States Department of the Treasury alleged that Bukele was secretly negotiating with gangs to lower the homicide rate, allegations which Bukele again denied.

From 25 to 27 March 2022, a spike in homicides in El Salvador left 87 people dead. The government attributed the spike to gang activity, and on 27 March, the Legislative Assembly declared a state of exception and authorized the mass arrests of gang members in the country. In May 2022, El Faro alleged that the spike in homicides occurred as a result of a breakdown in negotiations between the government and the gangs following the arrest of a high-ranking member of MS-13 in mid-March 2022. As of 18 October 2024, the ensuing gang crackdown has resulted in the arrests of 82,963 alleged gang members.
