= René Portillo Cuadra =

Salvadoran politician

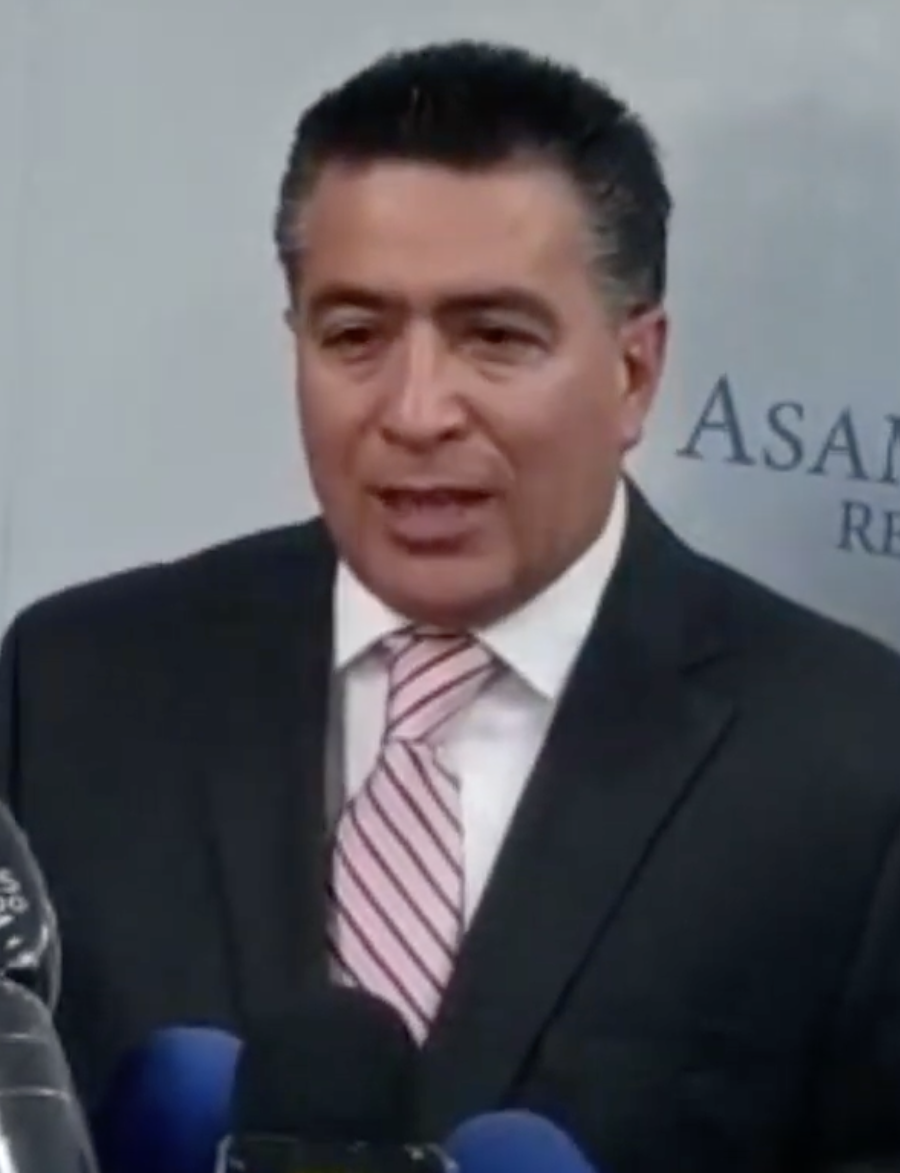
- Portillo Cuadra in 2021

Deputy of the Legislative Assembly of El Salvador from San Salvador
- In office 1 May 2015 – 1 May 2024
- Constituency: San Salvador

Personal details
- Born: René Alfredo Portillo Cuadra; 12 December 1970 (age 55) Chinameca, El Salvador
- Party: Nationalist Republican Alliance
- Education: University of El Salvador
- Occupation: Politician

René Alfredo Portillo Cuadra (born 12 December 1970) is a Salvadoran politician who previously served as a deputy of the Legislative Assembly from the department of San Salvador.

== Biography ==
René Alfredo Portillo Cuadra was born on 12 December 1970 in Chinameca, San Miguel, El Salvador. He graduated from the University of El Salvador.

He was a vice presidential candidate and running mate of Norman Quijano of the Nationalist Republican Alliance (ARENA) for the 2014 presidential election, but lost the election to Salvador Sánchez Cerén and Óscar Ortiz

He was elected as a deputy of the Legislative Assembly from the department of San Salvador in the 2015 legislative election, and was reelected in 2018 and 2021. On 24 January 2023, he announced that he would not seek re-election as deputy in the 2024 election.
