= Rodolfo Delgado (lawyer) =

Salvadoran lawyer

Doctor Rodolfo Delgado
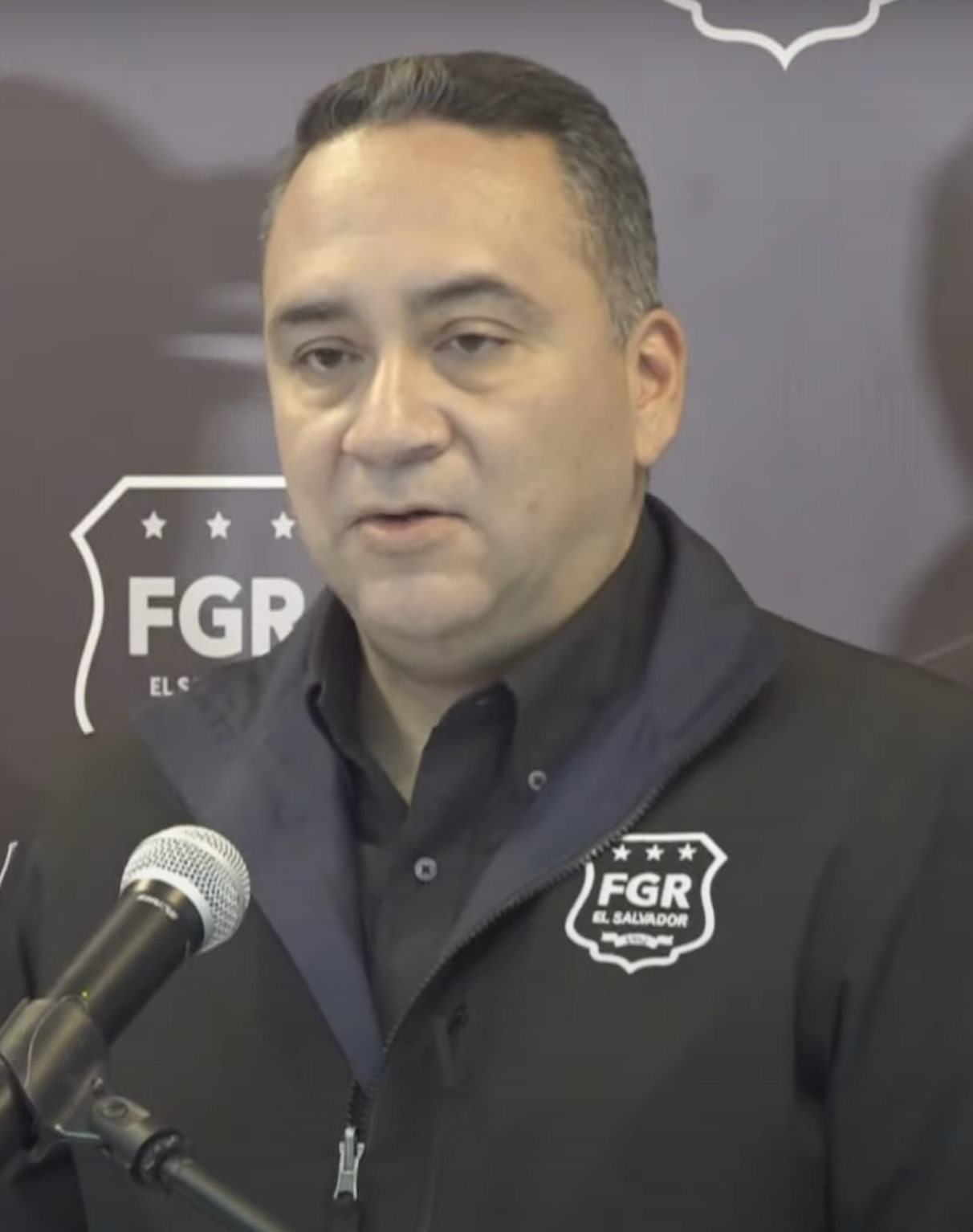
- Delgado in 2023

42nd Attorney General of El Salvador
- Incumbent
- Assumed office 2 May 2021
- President: Nayib Bukele
- Preceded by: Raúl Melara

Personal details
- Born: Rodolfo Antonio Delgado Montes El Salvador
- Education: José Matías Delgado University; José Simeón Cañas University
- Occupation: Lawyer

Rodolfo Antonio Delgado Montes is a Salvadoran lawyer who currently serves as the attorney general of El Salvador. He was appointed as attorney general by the Legislative Assembly in May 2021 after his predecessor, Raúl Melara, was removed by the Nuevas Ideas-led legislature. Prior to his appointment as attorney general, he worked for the Office of the Attorney General from 1995 to 2017 in various roles.

== Early life ==
Rodolfo Antonio Delgado Montes attended the José Matías Delgado University from 1992 to 1997, graduating as a Doctor of Juridical Science. In 2007, he earned a diploma of Higher Studies in Criminal Sciences from the José Simeón Cañas University.

== Legal career ==
=== Early career ===
In April 1995, Delgado became the 3rd assistant attorney general for First Criminal Court of the Sonsonate Department. In May 1995, he transferred to the San Vicente Department Regional Court as the 2nd assistant attorney general for the Crimes Against Minors and Women in their Family Relationships Unit and the Crimes Against Life Unit. In January 1997, he became the 2nd assistant attorney general for the national government's Crimes Against Minors and Women in their Family Relationships Unit.

In August 1997, Delgado was transferred to serve as the 2nd assistant attorney general of the national government's Department of Anti-Narcotrafficking. In March 2001, he became the coordinator of the Organized Crime Unit. In December 2004, Delgado became the Organized Crime Unit's special prosecutor, supervising and overseeing investigations into money laundering and defrauding the Public Treasury. He served as special prosecutor until July 2014, when he became the director of the Directorate of the Defense of State Interests, where he oversaw the State Criminal Unit, the Civil Unit, the Accounts and Fines Trial Unit, the Tax Unit, and the State Asset Control Unit.

In January 2016, Delgado was appointed by Attorney General Douglas Meléndez as an advisor for constitutional and administrative processes. In November 2016, a former agent of the United States Drug Enforcement Administration (DEA) revealed acusations of Delgado helping the Texis Cartel smuggle cocaine and weapons from El Salvador to Honduras. The Office of the Attorney General did not take any action against Delgado. Delgado's service as an advisor ended in October 2017.

From 2017 to 2021, Delgado worked as a lawyer in free practice. In 2017, he was the defense attorney for Byron Larrazabal, an associate of former President of the Legislative Assembly Sigfrido Reyes Morales. In 2020, he was the defense attorney for Mauricio Arriaza Chicas, the incumbent director of the National Civil Police, during an investigation into his role in the 2020 Salvadoran political crisis. From 2018 to 2021, he was the defense attorney for Jorge Manuel Vega and Vanessa Beatriz Argüello de Vega, both alleged collaborators of Mara Salvatrucha (MS-13), one of El Salvador's largest street gangs. Prosecutors alleged that Vega and Argüello had sold illegal drugs to MS-13 and allowed the gang to invest in motels with profits from extortions. Vega was acquitted in October 2020 while Argüello's case was closed in October 2021.

A 2021 investigation conducted by journalist Héctor Silva found that Delgado had worked for Alba Petróleos de El Salvador, a subsidiary of the Venezuelan oil company PDVSA, in 2019, during which, he earned US$46,600. The year prior, the company was being investigated for money laundering.

=== Attorney General of El Salvador ===
On 1 May 2021, the 13th session of the Legislative Assembly assumed office, and the Nuevas Ideas-led legislature voted to remove five justices of the Supreme Court and Attorney General Raúl Melara. The following day, the Legislative Assembly voted to replace Melara as attorney general with Delgado. Two weeks later, Delgado appointed Carlos Rodolfo Linares Ascencio, a trial judge from the Santa Ana Department, as his assistant attorney general.

On 4 June 2021, Delgado ordered the closure of the International Commission Against Impunity in El Salvador (CICIES)—a joint anti-corruption commission between El Salvador and Organization of American States (OAS)—after the OAS named Ernesto Muyshondt, the former mayor of San Salvador, as an anti-corruption advisor. Muyshondt was subsequently arrested for alleged association with gangs during the 2014 presidential election in support of Nationalist Republican Alliance presidential candidate Norman Quijano.

In August 2021, Salvadoran President Nayib Bukele alleged that the United States had solicited him to not allow Delgado to be re-elected as attorney general. On 22 December 2021, 66 out of the 84 deputies of the Legislative Assembly voted to re-elect Delgado to serve as attorney general for the 6 January 2022 to 6 January 2025 term. In December 2022, a video published on Facebook falsely claimed that United States President Joe Biden ordered the removal of Delgado from office.

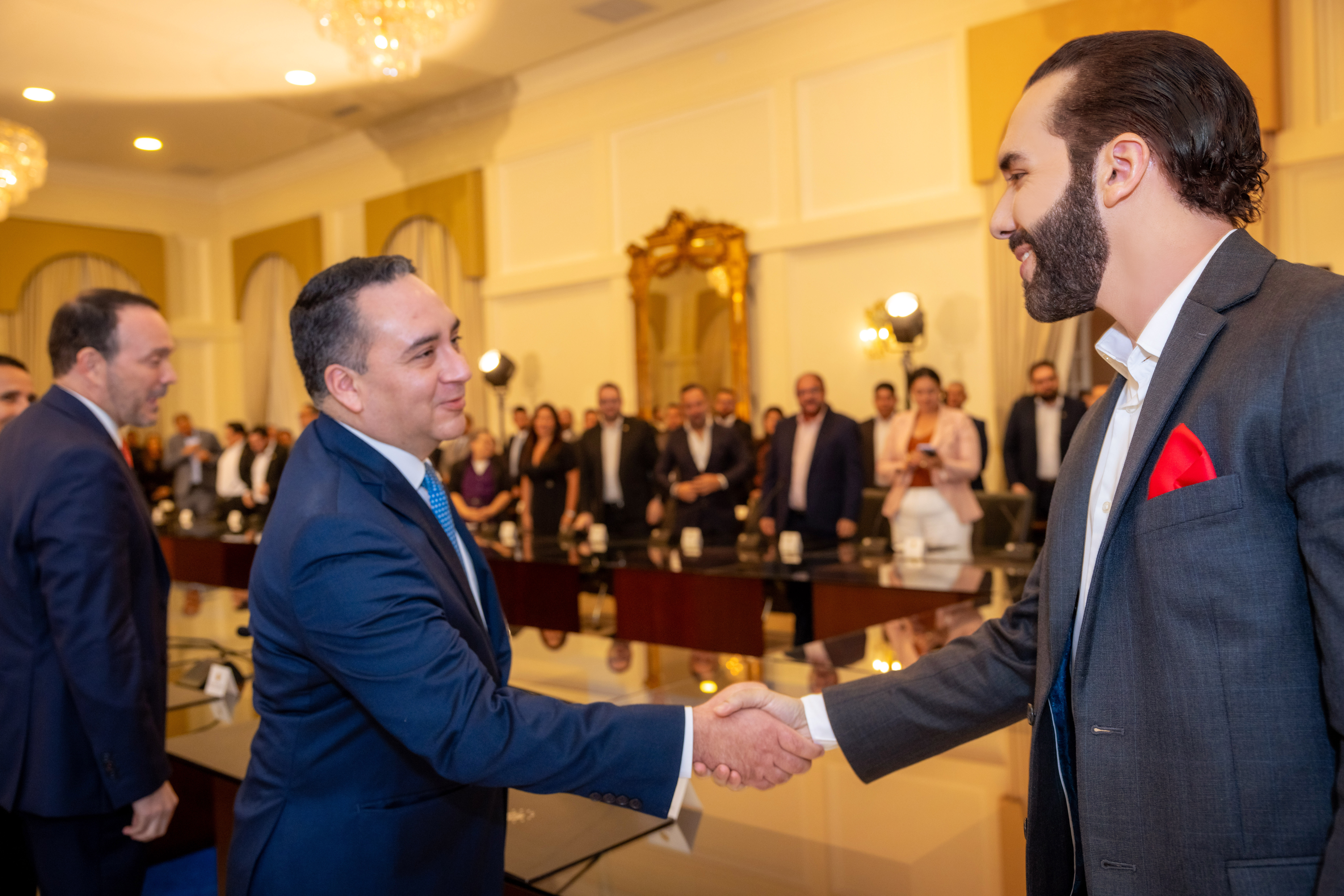
Delgado and Nayib Bukele in 2023

On 1 June 2023, during a speech to the Legislative Assembly celebrating his fourth year in office, Bukele announced the beginning of the war against corruption and announced that Delgado was in the process of confiscating various properties and assets owned by former President Alfredo Cristiani. Later that month, Delgado questioned why Interpol had not located or captured Salvadoran politicians accused of corruption, continuing by stating that Interpol believes that the cases are political in nature.

On 28 November 2023, Bukele publicly asked Delgado to investigate his entire cabinet, stating that he wanted to leave a positive legacy of combatting corruption.

On 23 December 2024, Delgado was re-elected by the Legislative Assembly to continue serving as attorney general from 2025 to 2028.

== Honors and awards ==
Delgado has received recognition from the Office of the Attorney General for his investigations into kidnappings while he served as the coordinator of the Organized Crime Unit. For those same investigations, he also received the DECO Police Hero award from the National Civil Police. In 2013, the Federal Bureau of Investigation (FBI) sent Delgado a letter of gratitude for his assistance in locating and capturing Edwin Ernesto Rivera Gracias, who was listed by the FBI in its Ten Most Wanted Fugitives list.

== See also ==
- Cabinet of Nayib Bukele

Legal offices
Preceded by Raúl Melara	Attorney General of El Salvador; 2021–present	Incumbent
