= Guillermo Gallegos =

Salvadoran politician

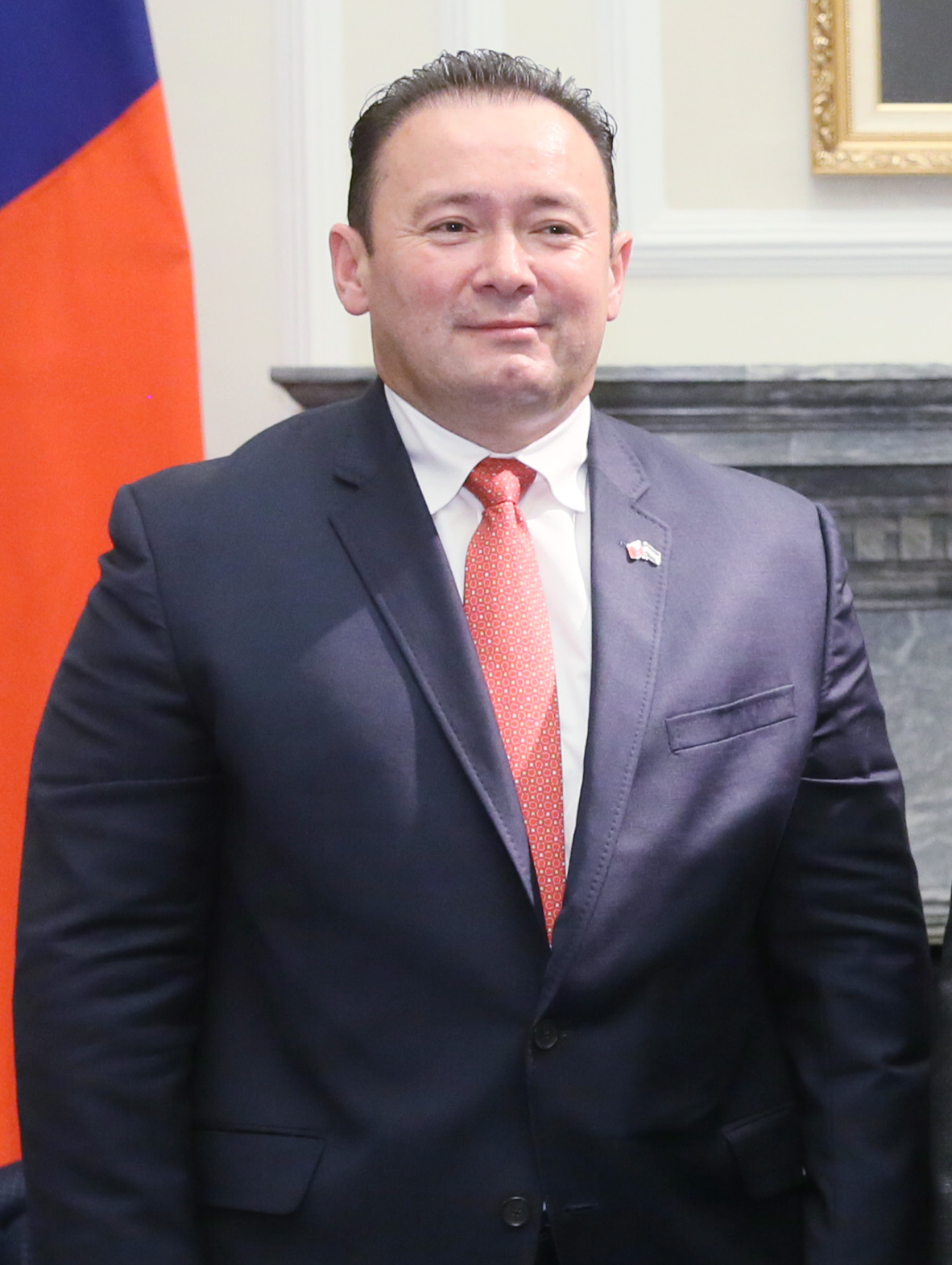
- Gallegos in 2017

105th President of the Legislative Assembly of El Salvador
- In office 8 November 2016 – 1 May 2018
- Preceded by: Lorena Peña
- Succeeded by: Norman Quijano

Deputy of the Legislative Assembly of El Salvador from San Salvador
- In office 1 May 2000 – 1 May 2024

Personal details
- Born: Guillermo Antonio Gallegos Navarrete; 24 June 1970 (age 56) Sensuntepeque, El Salvador
- Party: Grand Alliance for National Unity
- Other political affiliations: Nationalist Republican Alliance (until 2010)
- Education: Technological University of El Salvador
- Occupation: Politician, lawyer

Guillermo Antonio Gallegos Navarrete (born 24 June 1970) is a Salvadoran lawyer and former politician of the Grand Alliance for National Unity (GANA). He served as a deputy of the Legislative Assembly of El Salvador from 2000 to 2024 and as the president of the Legislative Assembly from 2016 to 2018.

== Early life ==
Guillermo Antonio Gallegos Navarrete was born on 24 June 1970 in Sensuntepeque, Cabañas, El Salvador. He graduated from the Technological University of El Salvador as a bachelor in legal sciences.

== Political career ==
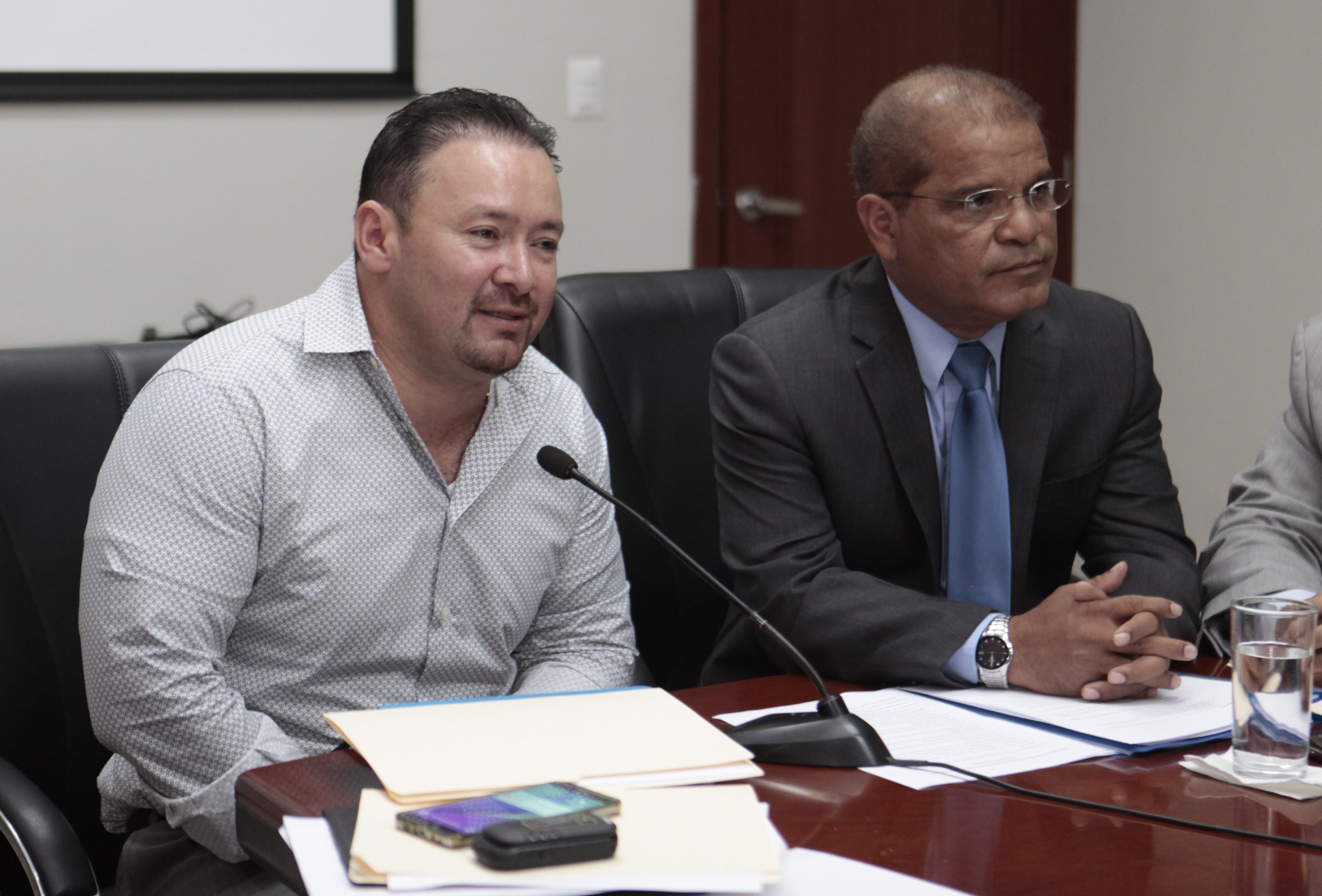
Gallegos with Vice President Óscar Ortiz in 2016.

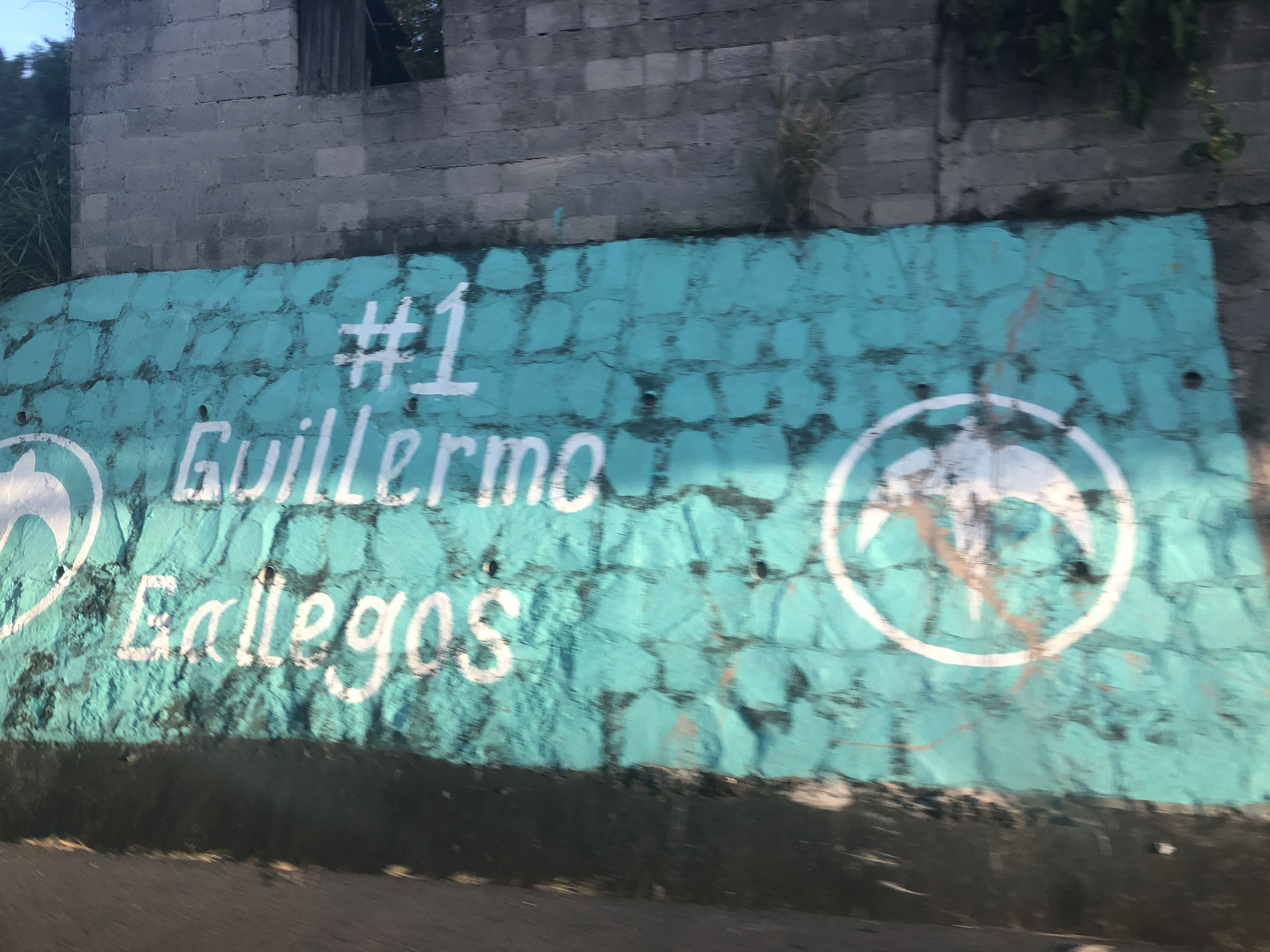
Political advertising supporting Gallegos's re-election in 2021.

Gallegos was elected as a deputy of the Legislative Assembly of El Salvador from San Salvador in the 2000 legislative election. He was re-elected to the Legislative Assembly in 2003, 2006, 2009, 2012, 2015, 2018, and 2021.

On 16 January 2010, Gallegos and eleven other deputies of the Nationalist Republican Alliance (ARENA) split from the party and established the Grand Alliance for National Unity. Gallegos was the party's founder.

In July 2013, Gallegos called for an investigation into the activities of Raúl Mijango regarding the government's ongoing truce with criminal gangs. On 4 July 2013, Mijango claimed that homicides would decrease in 72 afters after an increase in homicides, to which Gallegos stated "a person who has knowledge, control, and knows how the gangs act, and says that in 72 hours homicides may drop is also in some way an accomplice". Mijango refuted Gallegos' claim.

On 17 May 2021, Gallegos, along with four other government ministers, was named by the United States government as being corrupt.

=== 2024 election ===
In April 2023, Gallegos stating he would seek re-election to the Legislative Assembly in the 2024 legislative election, but later, in June 2023, he stated that he was running for mayor of San Salvador Centro. The following day, he reverted his decision, stating that he would be seeking re-election to the Legislative Assembly.

Gallegos and other leaders of GANA believed that incumbent president Nayib Bukele would run for re-election with GANA rather than switching to Nuevas Ideas. Gallegos stated that GANA would endorse Bukele's re-election campaign if he ran under the banner of another party instead of GANA and that GANA would not participate in the presidential election unless Bukele was the party's candidate. On 26 June 2023, the day after Bukele officially registered as Nuevas Ideas' presidential candidate, Gallegos confirmed that GANA would not run a presidential or vice presidential candidate, stating that the party supported Bukele's re-election campaign. Gallegos failed to win re-election in February 2024.

On 4 March 2024, Gallegos announced that he would retire from politics, stating that GANA needed new opportunities to grow.

Political offices
Preceded by Lorena Peña	President of the Legislative Assembly; 2016–2018	Succeeded by Norman Quijano
