= Unity Movement =

Political coalition in El Salvador

The Unity Movement (in Spanish: Movimiento Unidad, UNIDAD) was a political party coalition in El Salvador. The coalition was formed in 2013 by Former President Antonio Saca. The political parties that constituted the coalition included GANA, National Conciliation Party, and the Christian Democratic Party.

Saca was the coalition's candidate for president in the 2014 presidential election.
