= Antonio Saca =

President of El Salvador from 2004 to 2009

His Excellency Antonio Saca
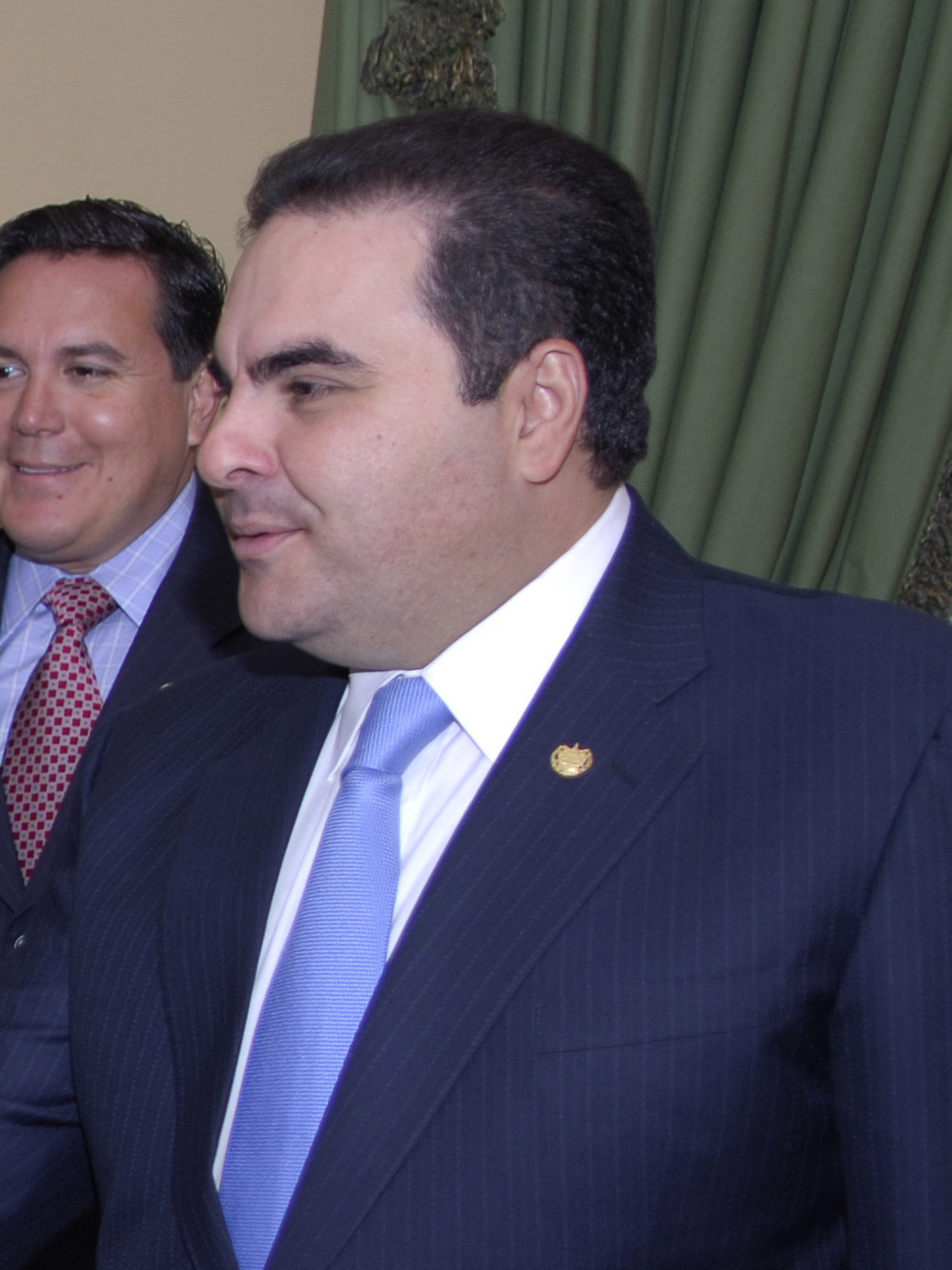
- Saca in 2007

40th President of El Salvador
- In office 1 June 2004 – 1 June 2009
- Vice President: Ana Vilma de Escobar
- Preceded by: Francisco Flores
- Succeeded by: Mauricio Funes

Personal details
- Born: Elías Antonio Saca González; 9 March 1965 (age 61) Santa Elena, El Salvador
- Party: Nationalist Republican Alliance (until 2009); Independent (2009–2013); Unity Movement (2013–2014); National Coalition Party (2013–2018)
- Spouse: Ana Ligia Mixco (m. 1989)
- Education: Central American University
- Occupation: Politician, businessman, journalist

Elías Antonio "Tony" Saca González (born 9 March 1965) is a Salvadoran politician, businessman, and journalist who was the 40th President of El Salvador from 2004 to 2009 as a member of the Nationalist Republican Alliance (ARENA). Saca is the most recent Salvadoran president to be a member of ARENA. He served a 10-year prison sentence for corruption from 2016 to 2026.

== Early life ==
Born in Santa Elena, El Salvador, Saca is of Palestinian descent on his father's side, from a family of Catholic immigrants who arrived in El Salvador in the early 20th century from Bethlehem. Saca's Muslim maternal grandfather, Musa Ali Saleh, changed his name to Moisés González. Saca's maternal side is the Flores family.

Prior to becoming president, Saca was a broadcast journalist, specializing in sports radio and a prominent businessman. He attended the University of Central America. He is an outspoken Evangelical Protestant and has expressed his faith through his historic friendliness with Salvadoran and American Protestant churches.

Saca married Ana Ligia Mixco Sol de Saca on 11 August 1989. The couple have three children, Gerardo Antonio, Jose Alejandro and Christian Eduardo.

== Presidency ==
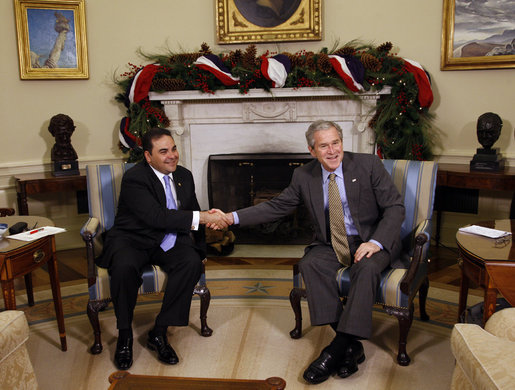
Saca meeting with U.S. President George W. Bush in Washington, D.C., 16 December 2008

On 21 March 2004, Saca was elected President of El Salvador, and on 1 June 2004 succeeded President Francisco Flores. Both Saca and Flores are members of the conservative Nationalist Republican Alliance party, generally known by its Spanish-language acronym ARENA. Like Flores, Saca was part of ARENA's moderate wing.

During the election campaign, some commentators criticized Saca's lack of political experience. In the election, Saca defeated leftist Farabundo Martí National Liberation Front (FMLN) candidate, Schafik Hándal, also of Arab descent. The election results were:

- Antonio Saca (ARENA) 57.7%
- Schafik Handal (FMLN) 35.6%
- Héctor Silva (CDU-PDC) 3.9%
- Others 2.8%

In August 2004, President of the Republic of China Chen Shui-bian awarded Saca the Order of Brilliant Jade with Grand Cordon.

The ARENA party expelled Saca in December 2009 for his suspected involvement in getting certain ARENA legislators to defect to a new party, the Grand Alliance for National Unity, in cooperation with the ruling FMLN government.

=== Policies ===
President Saca initiated the "Solidarian Network plan" in October 2005 with international aid from European countries such as Spain. This plan was aimed at communities considered below the poverty line. A map of poor areas was developed, and financial aid in the amount of $15 to $20 per month per family was to be distributed in the designation areas. The plan was initiated in the Balsam Range municipalities (Cordillera del Balsamo), such as Jicalapa, in La Libertad department.

With his embracing of the free-market and pro-United States policies like those pursued by Flores, Saca was the clear favorite of the United States government in the 2004 presidential election. Saca was one of a few leaders in Latin America to send troops to Iraq, though he was the only one to maintain them on extended deployment. El Salvador's military commitment in Iraq ended in early 2009.

Many attribute Saca's pro-U.S. attitude to the fact that he was openly supported by members of the Republican Party and the George W. Bush Administration during his political campaign in the 2004 elections. In the opinion of many analysts, the U.S. right wing felt confident that Saca would head a conservative government in line with their interests.

The FMLN accused the United States of intervening in the electoral process because several high-ranking officials warned that U.S. relations with El Salvador would be seriously threatened if Handal won the elections. This opinion was reinforced by the fact that ARENA assured that the United States could deport Salvadorans living there if the leftist candidate won.

== Allegations of corruption ==
President Saca was the subject of widespread allegations of corruption. A secret cable from the American Embassy in San Salvador, made public by Wikileaks, cites lawmakers from Saca's own ARENA party and business figures as raising specific concerns about Saca abusing the power of the presidency for his own personal gain. Such corruption "went beyond the pale" even by Salvadoran standards. According to the cable: "While the Salvadoran public may be inured to self-serving behavior by politicians, many in ARENA believe that the brazen manner in which Saca and his people are widely perceived to have used their positions for personal enrichment went beyond the pale. ARENA deputy (and son of controversial ARENA founder) Roberto D'Aubuisson told Poloff that Saca “deliberately ignored” his Public Works Minister's government contract kickbacks scheme, even after the case was revealed in the press. Furthermore, considerable evidence exists, including from U.S. business sources, that the Saca administration pushed laws and selectively enforced regulations with the specific intent to benefit Saca's family business interests."

The U.S. Embassy cable also made mention of Saca's multimillion-dollar mansion constructed during his presidency: "Saca also accumulated conspicuous assets – including a mansion in San Salvador and large landholdings in La Union that do not square with the investments and income he had prior to assuming the presidency."

Another classified U.S. Embassy cable reported that ARENA expelled Saca, "charging that he had misspent $219 million of unaccounted-for government funds, and citing improprieties in the 2008-2009 electoral process, claiming Saca had pressured mayors to vote for specified candidates under penalty of being excluded as ARENA municipal candidates." The ARENA leadership, according to the cable, "said Saca improperly transferred government funds to bolster his own image, despite funding shortages for public health and safety. Saca defended himself in a December 13 telephone interview with center-left online newspaper El Faro . . . . He also claimed the funding transfer was authorized by law."

In the midst of a political campaign, the former president was sued on 21 October 2013 for corruption and money laundering. On 7 March 2016, the El Salvador Supreme Court ordered Saca to stand trial for illegal enrichment. On 12 September 2018, he was sentenced to 10 years in prison by a tribunal.

== 2014 presidential election ==
Saca was a candidate in the 2 February 2014 elections. Though he leans politically to the right, Saca and the deputies aligned with him have often allied with the FMLN in the National Assembly to vote against ARENA, offering Saca a degree of political influence. He was running as part of a coalition of small parties called UNIDAD, which included groups from both the center-left and center-right, but was not expected to win. In fact, he lost.

== Operation "Destape a la Corrupción" ==
In the night of Saturday, 29 October 2016, Saca, was captured on alleged corruption charges by the police; according to the Prosecutor, Saca has been arrested for alleged illicit enrichment, unlawful association, and money laundering. Julio Rank (ex-secretary of communications), Cesar Funes (ex-secretary of the youth), and four other former officials in his government were also arrested. Prosecutor has accused him and the others for diverting from the public coffers a total of $246 million.

The initial hearing was held in the Fourth Court of Peace of San Salvador, in three sessions, one per day, resulting that on Saturday, 5 November, the Judge ordered the continuation of the process to the stage of investigation and the detention of those involved, including Saca.

== Conviction and imprisonment ==
On 12 September 2018, Saca received a 10-year prison sentence after he pled guilty to embezzlement and money laundering charges involving more than $300 million of public funds. On 18 September 2019, Saca received two more years in prison after pleading guilty to attempting to bribe a court employee with around $10,000 in exchange for information concerning a charge brought against him. At the time of his second conviction, Saca was already serving his 10-year prison sentence. The Salvadoran Supreme Court upheld Saca's 10-year prison sentence on 26 December 2019, and also ordered him to return some $260 million that he embezzled. The Supreme Court also upheld convictions against three former officials from Saca's inner circle and three his former presidential employees, and also ordered them to return stolen money as well. Saca's six co-defendants had received prison sentences ranging from 3 to 16 years.

On 5 January 2021, both Saca and his wife Ana Ligia de Saca were convicted of illicit enrichment and were ordered to repay the Salvadoran government $4.4 million. On 4 June 2021, Ana Ligia de Saca and her brother Oscar Edgardo Sol Mixco would be sentenced to 10 years in prison after being found guilty of money laundering and were ordered to repay $17.6 million to the Salvadoran government. On 27 October 2026, a court issued an order to release Saca from prison as he completed his 10-year prison sentence, which began retroactively to 30 October 2016 when he was initially arrested. He was released on 28 October.

== See also ==
- List of heads of state and government who were later imprisoned

Political offices
Preceded by Francisco Flores	President of El Salvador; 2004–2009	Succeeded by Mauricio Funes
