= 2014 Salvadoran presidential election =

- 2 February 2014 (first round); 9 March 2014 (second round)
- Registered: 4,955,107
- Turnout: 55.32% (first round) ▼7.60pp 60.89% (second round) ▲2.43pp
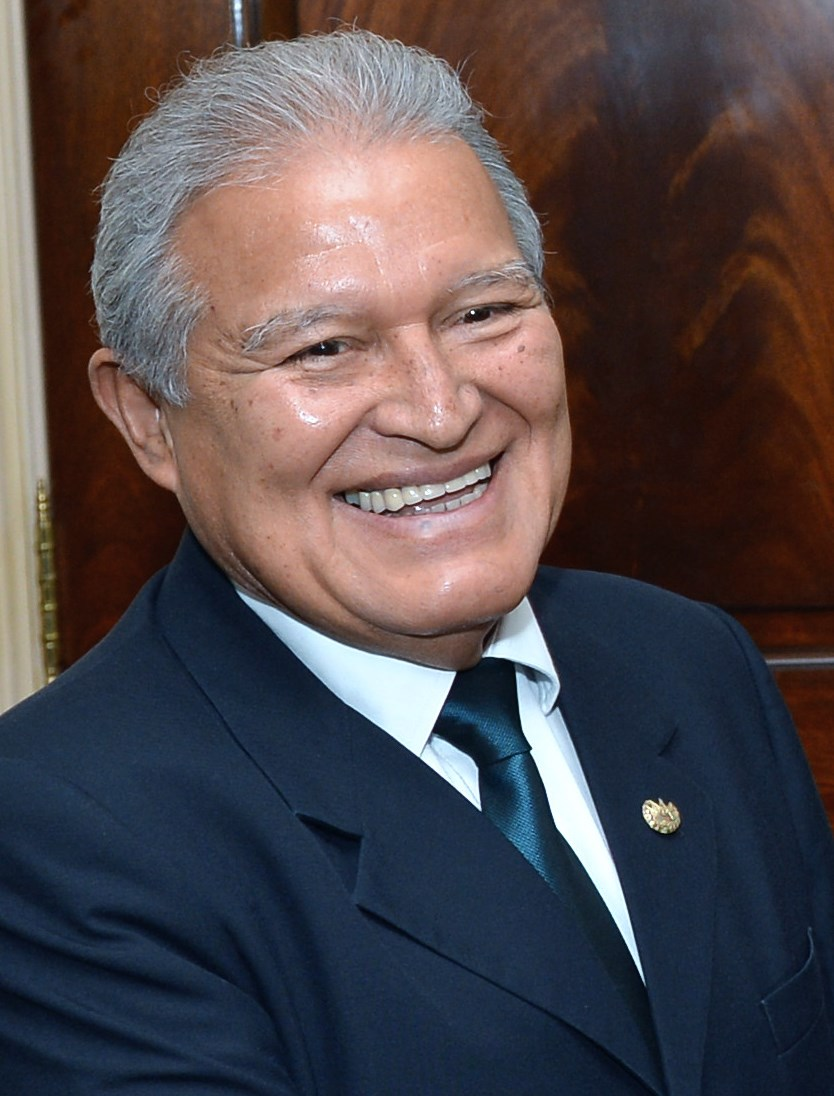

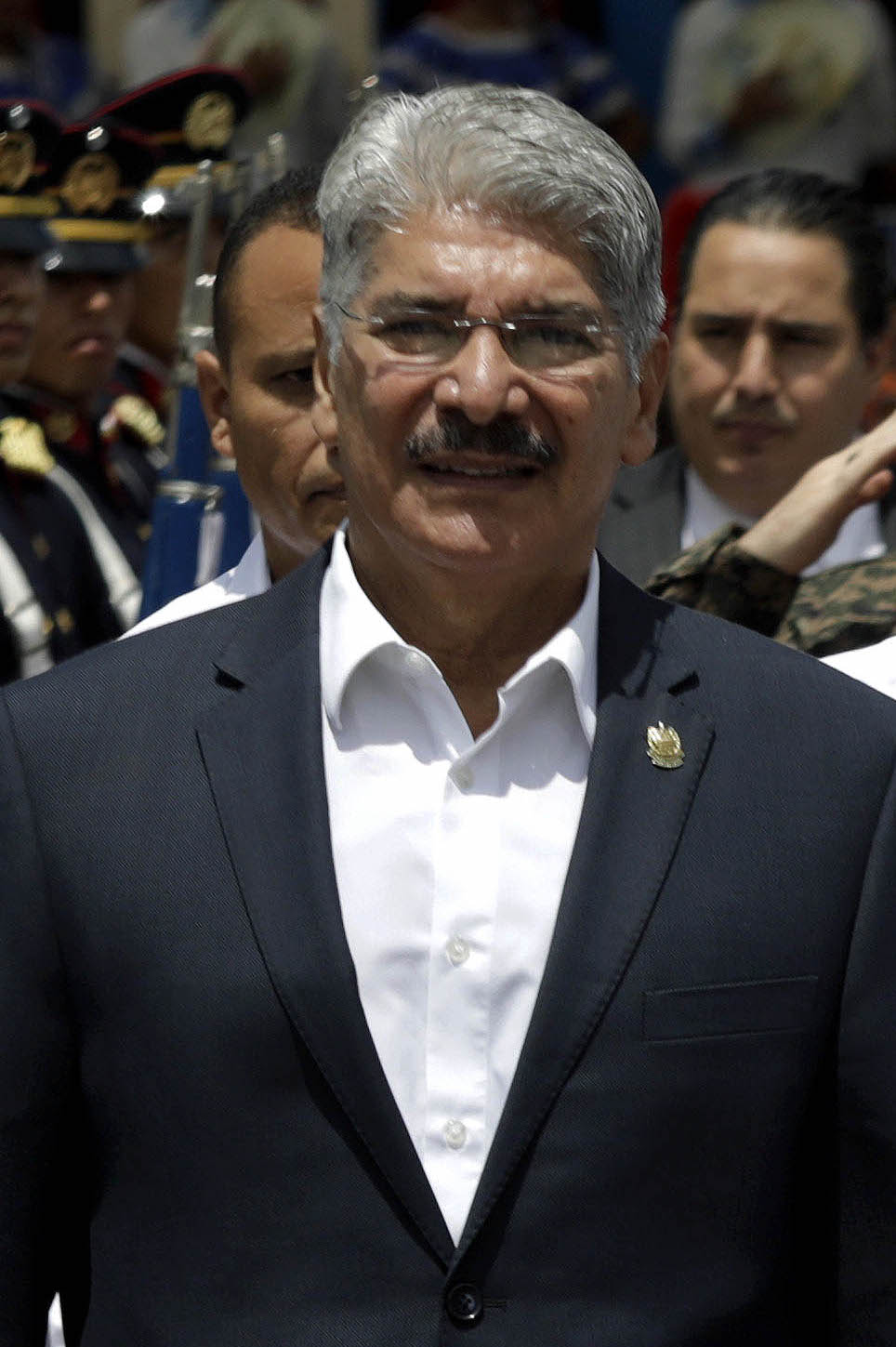
Nominee	Salvador Sánchez Cerén	Norman Quijano
Party	FMLN	ARENA
Running mate	Óscar Ortiz	René Portillo Cuadra
Popular vote	1,495,815	1,489,451
Percentage	50.11%	49.89%
President before election
Mauricio Funes
FMLN
Elected President
Salvador Sánchez Cerén
FMLN

Presidential elections were held in El Salvador on 2 February 2014, with a second round held on 9 March since no candidate won an outright majority. The primary candidates were Vice-President Salvador Sánchez Cerén of the FMLN, San Salvador Mayor Norman Quijano of ARENA, and former President Antonio Saca. Saca represented the Grand Alliance for National Unity, the National Coalition Party, and the Christian Democratic Party in the Unity coalition. Incumbent president Mauricio Funes was ineligible to run for a consecutive second term. Sánchez Cerén and Quijano emerged as the contestants in the runoff held on 9 March in which Sánchez Cerén was declared the victor.

== Background ==
On 22 October 2012, the Supreme Electoral Tribune increased the total number of voting centers and assigned eligible voters to the voting center closest to their address. Previously, eligible voters were assigned to municipal voting centers alphabetically, forcing some to travel longer distances to vote. The 2014 presidential election will be the first election to follow such rules.

On 24 January 2013, the Legislative Assembly passed legislation to allow Salvadorans living abroad to vote in all future elections. 92% of Salvadorans living abroad are based in the United States and Canada. According to the Supreme Electoral Tribune, there are 200,000 Salvadorans living internationally who are eligible to vote. The Farabundo Martí National Liberation Front's (FMLN) presidential candidate, Salvador Sánchez Cerén, visited southern California to meet with Salvadoran Americans and tour their communities in August 2013.

In regards to the high crime rate, there has been a two-year-old truce between the Mara Salvatrucha (MS-13) and Barrio 18 gangs that has halved the murder rate. Likewise, the 2012 Salvadoran legislative and local elections resulted in a strong showing for the opposition Nationalist Republican Alliance (ARENA) due to the rising crime rates.

== Candidates ==
The FMLN selected, Sánchez Cerén, a former rebel during the civil war, as the party's candidate. ARENA selected Norman Quijano as its candidate. The Unity Movement selected former president Antonio Saca with an announcement in February 2013 that had the backing of the Christian Democratic Party (PDC) and the National Coalition Party (PCN).

Party	Candidate		Running mate	
Farabundo Martí National Liberation Front Farabundo Martí; National Liberation; Front	Salvador Sánchez Cerén	Salvador Sánchez Cerén; 41st Vice President of El Salvador (2009–2014); Minister of Education (2009–2012); Deputy of the Legislative Assembly (2000–2009)	Óscar Ortiz	Óscar Ortiz; Mayor of Santa Tecla (2000–2014); Deputy of the Legislative Assembly (1994–2000)
Nationalist Republican Alliance Nationalist; Republican; Alliance	Norman Quijano	Norman Quijano; Mayor of San Salvador (2009–2015); Deputy of the Legislative Assembly (1994–2009)	René Portillo Cuadra	René Portillo Cuadra
Unity Movement Unity Movement (Note: Saca's campaign with the Unity Movement was supported by the Christian Democratic Party (PDC) and the National Coalition Party (PCN).)	Antonio Saca	Antonio Saca; 40th President of El Salvador (2004–2009)	Félix Ulloa	Francisco Laínez; Minister of Foreign Affairs (2004–2009)
Salvadoran Patriotic Fraternity Salvadoran; Patriotic; Fraternity	Óscar Lemus	Óscar Lemus	Adriana Bonilla	Adriana Bonilla
Salvadoran Progressive Party Salvadoran; Progressive; Party	René Rodríguez Hurtado	René Rodríguez Hurtado	Rafael Menjívar	Rafael Menjívar

=== Legal recourse ===
On 31 July 2013, a professor from the National University of El Salvador presented an argument to the Supreme Court on the constitutionality of a former president's candidacy. The legal language regarding second terms is unclear as the constitution prohibits two consecutive terms, but has been described as "murky" on plural non-consecutive terms. Saca claimed that this was an attempt for the FMLN and ARENA to exclude him from the presidential election. On 6 September, the Constitutional Chamber of the Supreme Court ruled that only party flags, not candidates faces, will appear on the ballot in the presidential election. Saca, as a former president, was widely recognized by Salvadorans, but his Unity coalition was not. He provided polling evidence to back his claim. Due to the court ruling, Unity proposed putting Saca's face on their party flag.

== Campaign ==
Quijano said that he would deploy the army to fight street gangs amidst elevated crime in El Salvador. Sánchez Cerén, on the other hand, said he would forge a political pact in order to pass reforms through a divided Congress that would tackle crime and anemic economic growth. He further said that he would tackle tax evasion and loopholes while also introducing tax incentives for investment in such industries as energy, renovating San Salvador's Comalapa International Airport and improve port facilities. He also said that he would seek to join Petrocaribe.

=== Farabundo Martí National Liberation Front ===
Sánchez Cerén and Óscar Ortiz stated that the "three pillars" of their program is employment, security, and education. In developing this program, the candidates received proposals from representatives of various sectors of society. They have argued that to achieve higher levels of employment these requires expanding public-private partnerships, sponsoring a public development bank, and promoting important industries. In regards to education, the candidates have promised more free food for children in school, a policy of "one child, one computer," and bilingual education. Sánchez Cerén has announced plans for the nation's first "digital university" and increased transportation funding around universities. To address the problems of crime and security, the candidates have proposed increasing funding for new police technologies, promoting campaigns against drug abuse, creating education rehabilitation centers for those convicted of minor offenses and drug crimes, and training community peace officers.

Sánchez Cerén was invited as a closing speaker to the FMLN's "Winter Cultural Dialogues," in which he expressed solidarity with the Bolivarian Alliance for the Americas. He expressed a desire for an alternative development models, such as the types seen in nations with left-wing governments in South America. The notion of "buen vivir," or "living well," was prominent in his political discussion. He said, "Living Well is a current of ideas, of values, of social proposals and policies that runs through Latin America, that tells us it is possible to live in a society governed by equality and fraternity." He stated he would have the nation join Petrocaribe, a multi-national oil alliance that purchases oil from Venezuela, which would allow the nation to buy oil at 60% its current costs, thus freeing up to $640 million to fund social investments proposals.

Sánchez Cerén has proposed the creation of a Ministry of Women. He has stated a plan for more maternity hospitals, domestic violence shelters, and expanding the Centros Ciudad Mujer, translated as "City of Women Centers," which provides services and healthcare to women.

=== Nationalist Republican Alliance ===
Quijano has primarily focused on reforming the economy for higher employment and stronger economic growth. He proposes to encourage the financing of small businesses and to help them make stronger returns. He wants legal reforms in the labor market to provide more mobility and flexibility for youth. Also, he has promoted laws for equal pay for women. He desires to see the government invest through public-private partnerships in building ports, airports, irrigation systems, railways, and highways to encourage intranational and international. He has proposed reforming the Ministry of Agriculture to provide more funding to farmers, help establish new farming technologies, facilitating the marketing of their products on the global market, and create a "true agro-export industry.

=== Unity Movement ===
On 14 October, Saca selected former ARENA politician Francisco Laínez, who defected from ARENA in March. He served as Minister of Foreign Relations during Saca's presidency. Saca praised Laínez's record in foreign political and economic relations.

Saca announced that as president, he would intend to cut "red tape" for international investment through cutting cumbersome paperwork. He has stated that his policies will create employment for young people in the private sector. He has proposed continuing social investments in healthcare begun under the FMLN, such as the Centros Ciudad Mujer. He states his administration will support Salvadorans abroad and will fight for immigration reform in the United States. Part of his platform includes developing a Vice Ministry of Livestock within the Ministry of Agriculture, aiming to support the dairy and livestock industries. He has promoted a program called "Semilla Mejorada," or "Improved Seed", which would decrease regulations regarding pesticides, insecticides, and would finance the introduction of newer agricultural equipment. Also, he had discussed founding a "land bank" to provide credit to farmers. Despite his efforts to go back to power, on 2 February the candidate came third with only 11.4% of the votes and was not able to continue the presidential race on the second round.

=== Debates ===
On 12 January, Quijano, Sánchez Cerén, Saca, Óscar Lemus of the Salvadoran Patriotic Fraternity (FPS), and René Rodríguez Hurtado of the Salvadoran Progressive Party (PPS) had their first debate ahead of the presidential election. The debate was moderated by Mexican journalist Armando Guzmán of Univision. Observers were critical of the debate. Roberto Rubio of El Salvador’s National Foundation for Development said: “It wasn’t really a debate. In a debate, there’s confrontation between ideas, and argument against argument." President Mauricio Funes even described the debate as "more of the same."

== Opinion polls ==
=== First round ===
Pollster	Date	Sample size	Sánchez FMLN	Quijano ARENA	Saca UNIDAD	Others	Unsure/ No ans.	Lead
First round	2 February 2014	–	48.93%	38.96%	11.44%	0.67%	–	9.97%
IUDOP-UCA	4–9 Jan 2014	1,580	37.2%	30.5%	21.2%	1.9%	9.2%	6.7%
Mitofsky	3–5 Jan 2014	–	31.8%	35.5%	16%	–	–	3.7%
CS-Sondea	27 Nov–8 Dec 2013	7,284	39.1%	34.2%	15.8%	1.2%	9.7%	4.9%
Data Research	23–25 Nov 2013	1,248	27.6%	27.8%	24%	–	–	0.2%
CIOPS	9–20 Nov 2013	1,526	38.4%	33.4%	16.6%	2.1%	5.0%	5%
Data Research	28 Sept–1 Oct 2013	1,287	30.4%	25.2%	25.5%	1.8%	15.6%	4.9%
Data Research	16–19 Aug 2013	1,330	29.2%	27.4%	27.8%	1.5%	14%	1.4%
CS-Sondea	20–27 July 2013	1,284	34.5%	26.9%	21.7%	–	–	7.6%
Mitofsky	12–14 July 2013	1,000	32%	33%	18%	2%	–	1%
JABES	6–9 July 2013	1,204	28.9%	27.8%	27.1%	0.5%	15.7%	1.1%
JABES	6–9 July 2013	1,204	29.9%	28.9%	27.7%	0.52%	–	1%
CS-Sondea	June 2013	–	34.6%	28.3%	24.5%	–	–	6.3%
CID-Gallup	30 May 2013	–	31%	31%	22%	–	–	Tie
CIOPS	9–16 May 2013	1,277	36%	24.9%	28.0%	11.1%	–	8%
Mitofsky	15 April 2013	–	32%	33%	18%	–	–	1%
La Prensa Gráfica	16–23 Nov 2012	1,268	16.1%	25.6%	6.3%	19.1%	20.7%	9.5%
Mitofsky	9–11 Nov 2012	1,000	30%	38%	–	21%	10%	8%

=== Second round ===
Pollster	Date	Sample size	Sánchez FMLN	Quijano ARENA	Unsure/ No ans.	Lead
Second round	9 March 2014	–	50.11%	49.89%	–	0.22%
UFG	15–18 Feb 2014	1,320	60.3%	39.7%	–	20.6%
UFG	15–18 Feb 2014	1,320	53.9%	35.5%	10.6%	18.4%
CID-Gallup	12–16 Feb 2014	1,007	58%	42%	–	16%
IUDOP-UCA	4–9 Jan 2014	1,580	46.2%	39.6%	6.8%	6.6%
Data Research	23–25 Nov 2013	1,248	37.4%	37.9%	–	0.5%
Data Research	28 Sept–1 Oct 2013	1,287	36.5%	30.4%	33.1%	6.1%
Data Research	16–19 August 2013	1,330	36.1%	38%	25.9%	1.9%

=== Other scenarios ===
The following polls display run-off scenarios that include Antonio Saca, who did not qualify for the second round.

==== Quijano vs. Saca ====
Pollster	Date	Sample size	Quijano ARENA	Saca UNIDAD	Unsure/ No ans.	Lead
Data Research	23–25 Nov 2013	1,248	30.9%	32.1%	–	1.2%
Data Research	28 Sept–1 Oct 2013	1,287	27.3%	30.9%	41.8%	3.6%
Data Research	16–19 August 2013	1,330	32.7%	35.3%	31.9%	2.6%

==== Sánchez Cerén vs. Saca ====
Pollster	Date	Sample size	Sánchez FMLN	Saca UNIDAD	Unsure/ No ans.	Lead
Data Research	23–25 Nov 2013	1,248	33.4%	35%	–	1.6%
Data Research	28 Sept–1 Oct 2013	1,287	28.7%	34.5%	36.8%	5.8%
Data Research	16–19 August 2013	1,330	33.7%	38.5%	27.9%	4.8%

== Conduct ==
ARENA and FMLN supporters briefly scuffled on voting day. Security was tightened on the day as about 4.9 million voters were eligible to cast their ballots. Sánchez Cerén said that he was "open to the participation of different sectors" and would seek to reach out to others to create "a grand national accord;" Quijano, who voted at a centre set-up at a school in western San Salvador, praising the "peaceful elections;" and Saca said that he was "optimistic" while voting. In the early hours of the day, supporters of each party set up stands with their party's colours across San Salvador and helped voters find their polling centres.

== Results ==
Candidate	Running mate	Party	First round		Second round	
Candidate	Running mate	Party	Votes	%	Votes	%
Salvador Sánchez Cerén	Óscar Ortiz	Farabundo Martí National Liberation Front	1,315,768	48.93	1,495,815	50.11
Norman Quijano	René Portillo Cuadra	Nationalist Republican Alliance	1,047,592	38.96	1,489,451	49.89
Antonio Saca	Francisco Lainez	Unity Movement	307,603	11.44		
René Rodríguez Hurtado	Adriana Bonilla	Salvadoran Progressive Party	11,314	0.42		
Óscar Lemus	Rafael Menjívar	Salvadoran Patriotic Fraternity	6,659	0.25		
Total			2,688,936	100.00	2,985,266	100.00
Valid votes			2,688,936	98.10	2,985,266	98.95
Invalid/blank votes			52,138	1.90	31,692	1.05
Total votes			2,741,074	100.00	3,016,958	100.00
Registered voters/turnout			4,955,107	55.32	4,955,107	60.89
Source: TSE, TSE

=== By department ===
==== First round ====
Department	Sánchez		Quijano		Saca		Rodríguez		Lemus	
Department	Votes	%	Votes	%	Votes	%	Votes	%	Votes	%
Ahuachapán	69,422	49.1	51,507	36.4	19,549	13.8	623	00.4	316	00.2
Cabañas	23,691	36.3	32,731	50.2	8,382	12.9	267	00.4	122	00.2
Chalatenango	43,633	47.0	39,494	42.6	9,118	9.8	354	00.4	156	00.2
Cuscatlán	50,609	44.9	46,118	40.9	15,407	13.7	417	00.4	316	00.2
La Libertad	146,254	45.1	137,909	42.5	37,611	11.6	1,458	4.5	1,052	00.3
La Paz	67,665	50.0	52,585	38.8	14,333	10.6	494	00.4	279	00.2
La Unión	49,253	52.5	36,638	36.6	7,266	7.7	503	00.5	186	00.2
Morazán	42,612	54.2	27,785	35.5	7,722	9.8	422	00.5	149	00.2
San Miguel	106,882	59.1	56,183	31.1	16,711	9.2	677	00.4	298	00.2
San Salvador	392,282	47.2	344,420	41.5	88,222	10.6	3,259	00.4	2,241	00.3
San Vicente	36,846	50.6	26,857	38.7	8,755	12.0	281	00.4	117	00.2
Santa Ana	103,904	45.9	87,683	38.7	32,844	14.5	1,188	00.5	742	00.3
Sonsonate	104,772	54.3	59,558	30.9	27,435	14.2	780	00.4	451	00.2
Usulután	76,786	55.1	47,525	34.1	14,112	10.1	578	00.4	276	00.2
Exterior vote	1,157	60.6	599	31.4	136	7.1	13	00.7	4	00.2
Source: Psephos

==== Second round ====
Department	Sánchez		Quijano	
Department	Votes	%	Votes	%
Ahuachapán	79,795	50.1	79,481	49.9
Cabañas	28,292	38.6	45,055	61.4
Chalatenango	53,248	51.6	50,016	48.4
Cuscatlán	57,525	46.3	66,840	53.7
La Libertad	166,083	46.5	190,837	53.5
La Paz	77,666	51.4	73,317	48.6
La Unión	55,051	49.6	55,991	50.4
Morazán	47,232	53.0	41,910	47.0
San Miguel	120,903	58.1	87,314	41.9
San Salvador	439,186	49.3	451,176	50.7
San Vicente	42,279	51.6	39,724	48.4
Santa Ana	121,405	47.6	133,606	52.4
Sonsonate	121,552	56.1	95,301	43.9
Usulután	87,350	53.9	74,797	46.1
Exterior vote	1,480	63.3	854	36.7
Source: Psephos

== Reactions ==
After voting ended in the first round, Sánchez Cerén said: "We won the first round ... we are sure that in the second round we will win by more than 10 points. We are going to work in the coming days to further unite," he added. "We are going to build new understandings, new alliances" and "more than ever we need a new national accord, so that we do not have partisan policies but policies that are backed by all the people of El Salvador." He also attended a mass earlier on the day at the chapel where Archbishop Óscar Romero was assassinated prior to the Salvadoran Civil War. Universidad Centroamericana estimated that Saca's supporters were likely to vote for Quijano in the run-off, but about 25 percent would support Sánchez Cerén and thus enable him to win the presidency.
