= Norman Quijano =

Salvadoran politician

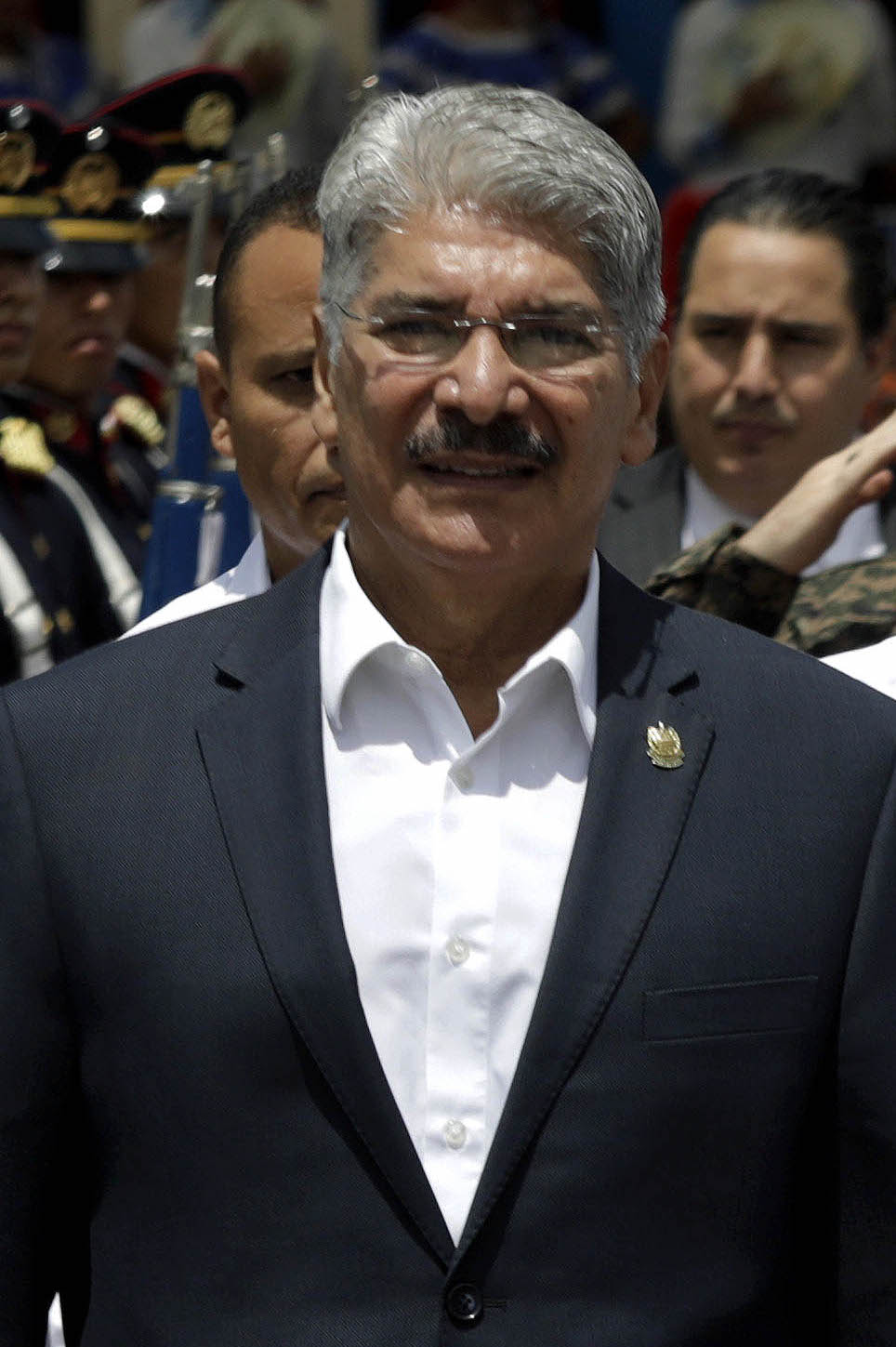

180th President of the Legislative Assembly of El Salvador
- In office 1 May 2018 – 1 November 2019
- Preceded by: Guillermo Gallegos
- Succeeded by: Mario Ponce

Deputy of the Legislative Assembly of El Salvador from San Salvador
- In office 1 May 2018 – 1 May 2021

124th Mayor of San Salvador
- In office 1 May 2009 – 1 May 2015
- Preceded by: Violeta Menjívar
- Succeeded by: Nayib Bukele

Personal details
- Born: Norman Noel Quijano González; 2 November 1946 (age 79) Santa Ana, El Salvador
- Party: Nationalist Republican Alliance (until 2024)
- Education: University of El Salvador

Norman Noel Quijano González (born 2 November 1946) is a Salvadoran politician and former Mayor of San Salvador, under the Nationalist Republican Alliance ticket, serving from 1 May 2009 until his resignation on 15 August 2013 in order to run as a presidential candidate. He was succeeded by Gloria Calderón de Oñate while the presidential campaign was taking place. After the election, he returned to the mayor office to resume his duties.

He served as the President of the Legislative Assembly of El Salvador from May 2018 to November 2019.

== Early life and education ==
Quijano was born on 2 November 1946 in Santa Ana, El Salvador. He graduated from high school in National Institute General Francisco Menéndez, and then as a doctor of dental surgery from the University of El Salvador in 1977.

== Political career ==
He started in politics when he served as the Manager of Social Action of the Municipality of San Salvador during the municipal government of Armando Calderón Sol between the years 1989 to 1994. Since 1994, he has participated in five continuous legislative periods and was secretary of the Board of the Legislative Assembly during the period 2006 to 2009.

In 2008 he was nominated as the candidate of the Nationalist Republican Alliance for mayor of San Salvador, a position he obtained in open elections 18 January 2009 and took office on 1 May of the same year.

On 28 October 2012, Norman Quijano ordered a clean up in the historic center of San Salvador, the country's capital. The municipal police removed street vendors in the middle of the night.

== Finance during Quijano management ==
According to official statements, the debt inherited from previous administrations exceeds the $32 million, currently has decreased to $27 million. According to economic analysts, for the first time in its history the mayorship of San Salvador achieved a surplus, it ended 2011 with nearly $4 million surplus.

== 2014 presidential election ==
On 20 August 2012, he was appointed as ARENA's presidential candidate for 2014 elections. On 15 August 2013, he resigned his position as mayor to run for president. In the first round on 2 February 2014, he placed second behind Salvador Sánchez Cerén with 39.0% of the vote but in the runoff on 9 March, he narrowly lost the runoff to Sánchez Cerén with 49.9% of the popular vote.

== Legal troubles ==
In April 2024, Norman Quijano was sentenced in absentia to 13 years and 4 months in prison for alleged illicit negotiations and electoral fraud. His legal team has appealed the conviction. Quijano and his attorneys argue that the process was politically motivated and that his parliamentary immunity as a PARLACEN deputy, arguing that it was improperly lifted by the Legislative Assembly. Critics of the proceedings claim that the country's judiciary has increasingly come under the influence of the governing party. ARENA expelled Quijano from the party after his conviction.

In March 2025, Quijano was detained by Immigration and Customs Enforcement (ICE) in the United States. He was deported to El Salvador on 26 January 2026, after which, the Office of the Attorney General (FGR) confirmed that he would be incarcerated to serve his 13-year sentence.

Political offices
Preceded by Violeta Menjívar	Mayor of San Salvador; 2009–2015	Succeeded by Nayib Bukele
Preceded by Guillermo Gallegos	President of the Legislative Assembly; 2018–2019	Succeeded by Mario Ponce
