= Nationalist Republican Alliance =

Conservative political party in El Salvador

Nationalist Republican Alliance Alianza Republicana Nacionalista
- Abbreviation: ARENA
- President: Carlos García Saade
- Founder: Roberto D'Aubuisson
- Founded: 30 September 1981; 45 years ago
- Registered: 4 December 1981; 44 years ago
- Headquarters: 2429 Arce Street & North 45-47 Avenue, San Salvador, El Salvador
- Youth wing: Nationalist Republican Youth
- Membership (2024): 116,000
- Ideology: Conservatism; Nationalism; Anti-communism; Economic liberalism
- Political position: Right-wing; Historical: Far-right
- Regional affiliation: Union of Latin American Parties
- International affiliation: International Democracy Union
- Colors: Blue; White; Red
- Slogan: Peace, progress and freedom; (Spanish: «Paz, progreso y libertad»)
- Anthem: Marcha de ARENA
- Seats in the Legislative Assembly: 2 / 60
- Municipalities: 1 / 44
- Seats in PARLACEN: 2 / 20

Party flag

Website
- arena.org.sv

The Nationalist Republican Alliance (Spanish: Alianza Republicana Nacionalista, abbreviated ARENA) is a conservative, right-wing political party of El Salvador. It was founded on 30 September 1981 by retired Salvadoran Army Major Roberto D'Aubuisson. It defines itself as a political institution constituted to defend the democratic, republican, and representative system of government, the social market economy system and nationalism.

ARENA controlled the Legislative Assembly of El Salvador until 1985, and its party leader Alfredo Cristiani was elected to the presidency in 1989. ARENA controlled the presidency from 1989 until 2009. The party gained a plurality in the Legislative Assembly in 2012. Maintaining only two seats in the 2024 legislative election, it has been the leading opposition party to the near-unanimous Nuevas Ideas.

== History ==
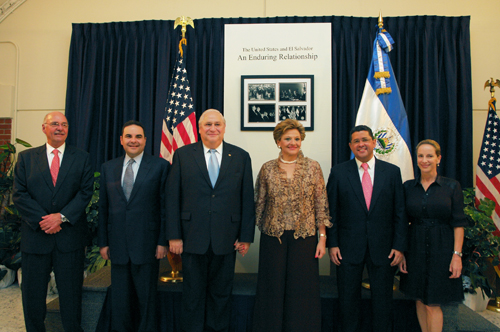
Alfredo Cristiani, Antonio Saca, Armando Calderón Sol, and Francisco Flores Pérez, ARENA's Presidents of El Salvador

The Nationalist Republican Alliance was founded on 30 September 1981 during the Salvadoran Civil War. Its founding leader was Roberto D'Aubuisson, a former major in the Salvadoran Army who was most well-known for commanding various death squads and ordering the assassination of Archbishop Óscar Romero in 1980. At the time of ARENA's establishment, it was considered a far-right political party. The Central Intelligence Agency (CIA) of the United States described ARENA as "reflect[ing] the personality" of D'Aubuisson, and that the party's primary goals were to defeat the far-left Farabundo Martí National Liberation Front (FMLN) and "restore El Salvador to the days before the 1979 officers' coup".

The party's initial membership primarily consisted of members of the Salvadoran Nationalist Movement (MNS) and the National Broad Front (FAN) opposed to the ruling Revolutionary Government Junta (JRG) and the preceding government of the National Conciliation Party (PCN).

The party arose in response to "the insurgency of the Farabundo Martí National Liberation Front, FMLN, a group that united peasant farmers, unionists and intellectuals, which tried, through arms, to overthrow the dictatorship and to install a state regime inspired by the governments of revolutionary Cuba and Sandinista Nicaragua".

The ideology the party claims to believe in is a system of democratic and representative government, emphasizing individual rights, the family as the nucleus of society and the respect for private property.

In February 2007, three ARENA politicians were murdered in Guatemala, including Eduardo D'Aubuisson, the son of party founder Roberto D'Aubuisson, in what was considered by the police as a crime related to drugs.

In 2009, ARENA took out a full-page ad in a Salvadoran newspaper calling on President Mauricio Funes to recognise the interim Honduran government of Roberto Micheletti installed after the military had expelled President Manuel Zelaya.

On 21 July 2022, Gustavo López Davidson, the leader of ARENA from August 2019 to February 2020, committed suicide amidst an ongoing investigation against him for embezzlement and arms trafficking.

From 2021 to 2024, the party was the second largest in the Legislative Assembly. Following the election of Nuevas Ideas' Nayib Bukele, the party has lost members of its party delegation to the ruling party.

== Structure ==
The National Executive Council (Consejo Ejecutivo Nacional, abbreviated COENA) is the leadership board of ARENA. Carlos García Saade has been the president of COENA since 27 February 2023.

In addition to the COENA, there are 14 Directors-in-Chief, one for each department and departmental councils called "Juntas Directivas Conjuntas" to coordinate political work in their respective department. In each department, a director is chosen who works with a specific member of COENA. The director's role is to organize and co-ordinate electoral campaigns and help the councils form party structures in the municipalities of their departments.

ARENA's party headquarters is located at 2429 Arce Street & North 45-47 Avenue in San Salvador. As of 2024, ARENA had 116,000 members.

== Electoral record ==
At the legislative elections held on 16 March 2003, the party won 32.0% of the popular vote and 27 out of 84 seats in the Legislative Assembly. ARENA's successful candidate in El Salvador's 2004 presidential election was Antonio Saca. On 21 March 2004, Saca defeated Schafik Hándal, the candidate of the left-wing Farabundo Martí National Liberation Front (FMLN), by a margin of 58% to 36% with 70% turnout. He was sworn in as president the following 1 June.

In the 12 March 2006 legislative election, the party won 39.4% of the popular vote and 32 out of 84 seats. At the 18 January 2009 legislative elections, the party received 38.55% of the vote, and again won 32 of the 84 seats.

On 15 March 2009, ARENA candidate Rodrigo Ávila lost the presidential election to Mauricio Funes of the FMLN. After elections, the party president was changed to Alfredo Cristiani.

On 9 March 2014, Salvador Sánchez Cerén of FMLN narrowly defeated the ARENA candidate Norman Quijano by 0.2% in a run-off vote in a controversial election.

ARENA also lost both 2019 presidential election and 2021 legislative election dominated by Nuevas Ideas, the party of current president Nayib Bukele. In 2024 election, ARENA got only two seats in the Legislative Assembly, while Bukele's Nuevas Ideas got supermajority.

== Electoral history ==
=== Presidential elections ===
Election	Candidate	First round			Second round			Result	Ref.
Election	Candidate	Votes	%	Pos.	Votes	%	Pos.	Result	Ref.
1982	Hugo César Barrera	17 (Note: The 1982 presidential election was determined by the Legislative Assembly rather than through a popular vote.)	32.08%	▲2nd	—N/a			Lost ✗	
1984	Roberto D'Aubuisson	376,917	29.77%	2nd	651,741	46.41%	▲2nd	Lost ✗	
1989	Alfredo Cristiani	505,370	53.82%	▲1st	—N/a			Elected ✓	
1994	Armando Calderón Sol	641,108	49.03%	1st	818,264	68.35%	▲1st	Elected ✓	
1999	Francisco Flores	614,268	51.96%	1st	—N/a			Elected ✓	
2004	Antonio Saca	1,314,436	57.71%	1st	—N/a			Elected ✓	
2009	Rodrigo Ávila	1,284,588	48.68%	▼2nd	—N/a			Lost ✗	
2014	Norman Quijano	1,047,592	38.96%	2nd	1,489,451	49.89%	▼2nd	Lost ✗	
2019	Carlos Calleja	857,084	31.72%	2nd	—N/a			Lost ✗	
2024	Joel Sánchez	177,881	5.57%	▼3rd	—N/a			Lost ✗	
2027	Mayteé Iraheta	To be determined			Second round abolished			TBD	

=== Legislative Assembly elections ===
View source data.

Election	Votes	%	Position	Seats	+/–	Status in legislature	Ref.
1982	430,205	29.28%	▲2nd	19 / 60	▲19	Opposition	
1985	286,665	29.70%	▲2nd	13 / 60	▼6	Opposition	
1988	447,696	48.10%	▲1st	31 / 60	▲18	Government	
1991	466,091	44.33%	▲1st	39 / 84	▲8	Coalition government	
1994	605,775	45.03%	▲1st	39 / 84	0	Coalition government	
1997	396,301	35.40%	▲1st	28 / 84	▼11	Coalition government	
2000	436,169	36.04%	▲1st	29 / 84	▲1	Coalition government	
2003	446,233	31.90%	▼2nd	27 / 84	▼1	Coalition government	
2006	620,117	39.40%	▼2nd	34 / 84	▲7	Coalition government	
2009	854,166	38.55%	▼2nd	32 / 84	▼2	Opposition	
2012	620,117	39.40%	▼2nd	34 / 84	▲2	Opposition	
2015	885,374	38.90%	▲1st	32 / 84	▼2	Opposition	
2018	886,365	41.72%	▲1st	37 / 84	▲5	Coalition government	
2021	305,108	12.22%	▼2nd	14 / 84	▼23	Opposition	
2024	227,357	7.29	2nd	2 / 60	▼12	Opposition	
2027	To be determined						

== See also ==
- List of political parties in El Salvador
- Politics of El Salvador
