= Right of Salvadoran expatriates to vote =

Articles 3, 72, and 79 of the constitution of El Salvador guarantee all Salvadorans, including expatriates, the right to vote and stand for election in presidential, legislative, and municipal elections. As of 2024, Salvadoran expatriates are allowed to vote in presidential and legislative elections. In El Salvador, expatriate votes are referred to as the exterior vote (Spanish: voto en el exterior).

Salvadoran expatriates were first permitted to vote during the 2009 presidential election when the Legislative Assembly approved a law to allow expatriates with a valid Unique Identity Document (DUI) to vote in that election. In 2013, the legislature approved the Special Law for Exercising the Vote from the Exterior (LEVEX) that permanently allowed Salvadoran expatriates to vote in all future presidential elections. In 2016, the Supreme Court of Justice ordered the Legislative Assembly to expand expatriate suffrage to the legislative and municipal elections. In 2022, the legislature approved the Special Law for the Exercise of Suffrage in the Exterior (LEESE) that allowed expatriates to vote in legislative elections, and in 2026, it created an overseas constituency with 6 seats to directly represent expatriates in the Legislative Assembly.

During the presidency of Nayib Bukele, the debate regarding expatriate voting has largely focused on potential fraud, transparency, and concentration of power rather than on expatriate voting itself. Bukele and his allies in the Legislative Assembly support expanding expatriate voting rights while the opposition opposes the manner in which it has been implemented.

== History ==
=== Implementation ===
In 1994, some Salvadoran political parties proposed a constitutional reform to allow Salvadoran expatriates to vote in national elections, but the reform was never approved. In February 2009, the Legislative Assembly of El Salvador approved the "Special Transitory Law of Procedures for the Exercise of the Vote of Salvadoran Residents in the Exterior, Registered in the Electoral Registry, for the Elections for President and Vice President in the Year 2009" (Note: Spanish: Ley Transitoria Especial Reguladora de los Procedimientos para el Ejercicio del Voto de los Salvadoreños Residentes en el Exterior, Inscritos en el Registro Electoral, para las Elecciones de Presidente y Vicepresidente del Año 2009) that enabled Salvadoran expatriates to vote in the 2009 presidential election. Salvadoran expatriates had to return to San Salvador, El Salvador's capital city, and cast their vote at the Special Voting Center. Out of 39,463 eligible expatriate voters, 294 voted, all of whom were from the United States.

President Mauricio Funes, the winner of the 2009 election, pursued a permanent solution to grant the right to vote to Salvadoran expatriates during his presidency. In July 2012, Funes' government submitted a law to the Legislative Assembly to permit expatriates to vote in all future presidential elections. On 24 January 2013, Legislative Assembly approved the "Special Law for Exercising the Vote from the Exterior" (Note: Spanish: Ley Especial para el Ejercicio del Voto Desde el Exterior) (LEVEX). The law also allowed expatriates to vote from the country they resided in via mail instead of having to return to El Salvador to vote. In March 2013, the Salvadoran government projected that up to 125,000 expatriates could have been eligible to vote in the 2014 presidential election but only 10,337 were fully registered by the time of the election, of whom, 2,727 voted in the first round and 2,706 voted in the second round.

On 23 December 2016, the Supreme Court of Justice of El Salvador issued a ruling that LEVEX was partially unconstitutional as it did not guarantee Salvadoran expatriates the right to vote in legislative and municipal elections as mandated by articles 3, 72, and 79 of the constitution of El Salvador. The court instructed the Legislative Assembly to rectify the law and permit Salvadoran expatriates to vote and stand for election in legislative and municipal elections by the 2021 legislative election at the latest if not enacted by the 2018 legislative election. The Legislative Assembly discussed implementing expatriate suffrage in legislative and municipal elections in 2017 but ultimately did not implement the reform in time for the 2018 legislative election. During the 2019 presidential election, out of over 350,000 potential eligible voters, only 5,948 were fully registered, of whom, 3,808 voted.

=== Reforms under Nayib Bukele ===
In February 2020, President Nayib Bukele vetoed an amendment to LEVEX on the premise that it did not comply with the Supreme Court of Justice's 2016 ruling. On 24 July, the Supreme Court of Justice sided with Bukele and ruled that the amendment was unconstitutional as it did not guarantee Salvadoran expatriates the right to participate in legislative and municipal elections. The court instructed the Legislative Assembly to amend LEVEX in a manner which guaranteed Salvadoran expatriates the right to vote and stand for legislative and municipal elections, but it also extended the 2021 deadline to the 2024 legislative election.

On 18 October 2022, the Legislative Assembly approved the "Special Law for the Exercise of Suffrage in the Exterior" (Note: Spanish: Ley Especial para el Ejercicio del Sufragio en el Extranjero) (LEESE) that allowed Salvadoran expatriates to vote in presidential and legislative elections from the 2024 elections, but not for municipal elections or for the Central American Parliament. Regarding the lack of suffrage for municipal elections, Nuevas Ideas legislator Santos stated that Salvadoran expatriates who possess a DUI with a Salvadoran address can visit the country to cast their vote in municipal elections. A total of 741,094 expatriates were registered to vote in the 2024 presidential and legislative elections; 330,233 voted in the presidential election and 246,168 voted in the legislative election. During the 2024 election, expatriate votes in the legislative election were counted towards the vote total of the San Salvador Department.

The composition of the Legislative Assembly from 2027 after the creation of an overseas constituency

On 29 April 2026, Bukele proposed a law to the Legislative Assembly to create an overseas constituency in the Legislative Assembly to directly represent Salvadoran expatriates in the legislature. The Legislative Assembly approved the proposal that same day. The legislature ratified the law on 7 May and assigned 6 seats to the overseas constituency. As to not increase the number of seats in the Legislative Assembly, 5 seats were taken from San Salvador and 1 was taken from La Libertad to be assigned to the overseas constituency.

== Voting procedure ==
Expatriates must possess a valid Unique Identity Document (DUI) in order to vote. Until the 2019 election, the address on the DUI had to be from outside of El Salvador; since the 2024 election, the address on the DUI could be from inside or outside of El Salvador. From the 2027 election, expatriates could present an expired DUI to vote.

In the 2009 presidential election, expatriates had to return to San Salvador to cast their vote at the Special Voting Center located at the Jorge "El Mágico" González Stadium. Since 2014, expatriates have been allowed to vote from the country they resided in. In November 2013, the Salvadoran government created the Electoral Junta for the Exterior Vote (JEVEX) and the Reception Junta of the Exterior Vote (JRVEX) to administer expatriate voting. In the 2014 and 2019 presidential elections, expatriates received and sent their ballot in the mail where it was received at the International Center for Fairs and Conventions.

Since 2024, expatriates can vote either by remote electronic voting if their DUI lists an address outside of El Salvador or by in-person electronic voting if their DUI lists an address from El Salvador. In the former case, voters were allowed to cast their vote up to 30 days before election day in 2024, while in the latter case, voters had to cast their vote on election day. Alternatively, Salvadorans could present their passport in place of their DUI.

=== Expatriate candidates ===
Per the Law of Political Parties, legislators of the overseas constituency must be Salvadoran expatriates. Legislators must be at least 25 years old, be Salvadorans by birth or have at least one Salvadoran parent, and not have had their rights as a citizen suspended within five years of an election. To nominate expatriate candidates, political parties must hold primary elections outside of the country at locations where expatriates affiliated with those political parties can vote. Like in the 14 departments, political parties can form electoral coalitions for the overseas legislators.

== Debate on expanding suffrage ==
When the Legislative Assembly approved LEVEX in 2013, it received 82 out of 84 votes in favor. Furthermore, all political parties supported the implementation of LEVEX. During Bukele's presidency, expatriate voting has become more contentious. LEESE was approved by a vote of 66 in favor, 10 against, and 4 abstentions; the ruling, pro-Bukele voted in favor while the opposition voted against or abstained. Meanwhile, the creation of the overseas constituency was approved by a vote of 57 in favor while the 3 opposition legislators did not vote. Much of the debate on the implementation of expatriate voting, especially during Bukele's presidency, revolved around potential fraud, transparency, and concentration of power rather than on the topic of expatriate voting itself.

=== Support ===
Ernesto Castro, a legislator for Nuevas Ideas and the president of the Legislative Assembly, praised LEESE as "truly historic" ("verdaderamente histórico") and stated that transparency would be a priority in the expatriate voting process. Santos criticized the opposition's vote against LEESE, remarking that "they will always be against it" ("siempre van a estar en contra"). Grand Alliance for National Unity (GANA) legislator Numan Salgado criticized accusations that LEESE would lead to fraud by asking why Bukele would deploy fraud in the 2024 election as he had high approval ratings.

When the Legislative Assembly approved the creation of an overseas constituency, Nuevas Ideas legislator Raúl Chamagua praised the event as "a very important day for the country's democracy" ("un día muy importante para la democracia del país"). Nuevas Ideas legislator Alexia Rivas stated that removing seats from La Libertad and San Salvador did not matter, arguing that it was necessary to represent expatriates in the legislature. Manuel Flores, the leader of the opposition Farabundo Martí National Liberation Front (FMLN), stated that the party had always supported extending suffrage to Salvadoran expatriates.

=== Opposition ===
In the lead up to the 2024 elections, the opposition criticized LEESE and raised concerns of fraud and transparency. FMLN legislator Anabel Belloso questioned why the expatriate vote was assigned to San Salvador specifically. Ana María Méndez Dardón, a contributor to the Washington Office on Latin America, noted that San Salvador had the most contested seats and that opinion polling for the expatriate vote heavily favored Bukele's Nuevas Ideas. Vamos legislator Claudia Ortiz criticized how quickly the reform was implemented and stated that an audit of the process would not have been able to be completed before the election. Nationalist Republican Alliance (ARENA) legislator César Reyes noted that someone could fraudulently vote more than once by presenting their DUI and passport on different occasions. FMLN legislator Marleni Funes commented that the expatriate vote could be subject to data leaks. Former FMLN diplomat Rubén Zamora referred to LEESE as a "farse".

Regarding the overseas constituency, ARENA legislator Marcela Villatoro criticized the Legislative Assembly's decision to take seats away from La Libertad and San Salvador, especially as those two departments have the highest rates of migration to them. ARENA legislator Francisco Lara argued that Nuevas Ideas would use the overseas constituency to consolidate its power in the Legislative Assembly. Cambio Total leader Ronal Umaña accused Nuevas Ideas of taking seats away from Salvadorans through the creation of the overseas constituency.

=== Opinion polling ===
According to an opinion poll conducted by La Prensa Gráfica in April 2026, 45 percent of Salvadorans supported expatriate representation in the legislature while 48 percent opposed it.

== Election results ==
=== Presidential elections ===
The following table lists how Salvadoran expatriates voted in presidential elections. The table shows the two candidates who received the most votes from expatriates, and the national election winner is in bold.

Year	Winner				Runner-up				Other(s)		Invalid votes	Total votes cast	Registered voters	Ref.
Year	Candidate	Party	Votes	%	Candidate	Party	Votes	%	Votes	%	Invalid votes	Total votes cast	Registered voters	Ref.
2009	**Mauricio Funes**	FMLN	162	55.10%	Rodrigo Ávila	ARENA	132	44.90%	–	–	0	294	39,463	
2014 (1st)	Salvador Sánchez Cerén	FMLN	1,157	60.61%	Norman Quijano	ARENA	599	31.38%	153 (Note: Antonio Saca (Unity Movement): 136 (7.12%); René Rodríguez Hurtado (Salvadoran Progressive Party): 13 (0.68%); Óscar Lemus (Salvadoran Patriotic Fraternity): 4 (0.21%))	8.01%	818	2,727	10,337	
2014 (2nd)	**Salvador Sánchez Cerén**	FMLN	1,480	63.41%	Norman Quijano	ARENA	854	36.59%	–	–	744	2,706	10,337	
2019	**Nayib Bukele**	GANA	3,133	86.00%	Hugo Martínez	FMLN	342	9.39%	168 (Note: Carlos Calleja (Nationalist Republican Alliance): 165 (4.52%); Josué Alvarado (Vamos): 3 (0.09%))	4.61%	165	3,808	5,948	
2024	**Nayib Bukele**	NI	322,645	97.87%	Manuel Flores	FMLN	2,854	0.87%	4,152 (Note: Joel Sánchez (Nationalist Republican Alliance): 1,938 (0.59%); Luis Parada (Nuestro Tiempo): 1,826 (0.55%); Marina Murillo (Salvadoran Patriotic Fraternity): 213 (0.06%); Javier Renderos (Solidary Force): 175 (0.05%))	1.26%	582	330,233	741,094	
2027	To be determined				To be determined				TBD		TBD	TBD	1,098,986	

=== Legislative elections ===
The following table lists how Salvadoran expatriates voted in legislative elections. The table shows all the parties that won seats from the expatriate vote.

Year	Expatriate legislative representation					Total seats	Invalid votes	Total votes cast	Registered voters	Ref.
Year	Parties	Seats	Votes	%	Legislators	Total seats	Invalid votes	Total votes cast	Registered voters	Ref.
2024	NI	14	234,442	95.54%	List: Rodrigo Ayala (NI); Suecy Callejas (NI); Ernesto Castro (NI); Magdalena Figueroa (NI); Rubén Flores (NI); Francisco García (NI); Dania González (NI); Diana González (NI); Christian Guevara (NI); Edgardo Meléndez (NI); Claudia Ortiz (V); Alexia Rivas (NI); Elisa Rosales (NI); Dennis Salinas (NI); Marcela Villatoro (ARENA); Benjamín Zavaleta (NI)	16 (Note: During the 2024 legislative election, Salvadoran expatriate votes were counted towards the seat count of the San Salvador Department rather than to an overseas constituency.)	783	246,168	741,094	
2024	ARENA	1	2,004	0.82%	List: Rodrigo Ayala (NI); Suecy Callejas (NI); Ernesto Castro (NI); Magdalena Figueroa (NI); Rubén Flores (NI); Francisco García (NI); Dania González (NI); Diana González (NI); Christian Guevara (NI); Edgardo Meléndez (NI); Claudia Ortiz (V); Alexia Rivas (NI); Elisa Rosales (NI); Dennis Salinas (NI); Marcela Villatoro (ARENA); Benjamín Zavaleta (NI)	16	783	246,168	741,094	
2024	V	1	1,821	0.74%	List: Rodrigo Ayala (NI); Suecy Callejas (NI); Ernesto Castro (NI); Magdalena Figueroa (NI); Rubén Flores (NI); Francisco García (NI); Dania González (NI); Diana González (NI); Christian Guevara (NI); Edgardo Meléndez (NI); Claudia Ortiz (V); Alexia Rivas (NI); Elisa Rosales (NI); Dennis Salinas (NI); Marcela Villatoro (ARENA); Benjamín Zavaleta (NI)	16	783	246,168	741,094	
2024	Other (Note: Grand Alliance for National Unity: 2,940 (1.20%); Farabundo Martí National Liberation Front: 2,188 (0.89%); Nuestro Tiempo: 900 (0.37%); Christian Democratic Party: 420 (0.17%); National Coalition Party: 399 (0.16%); Solidary Force: 271 (0.11%))	0	7,118	2.90%	List: Rodrigo Ayala (NI); Suecy Callejas (NI); Ernesto Castro (NI); Magdalena Figueroa (NI); Rubén Flores (NI); Francisco García (NI); Dania González (NI); Diana González (NI); Christian Guevara (NI); Edgardo Meléndez (NI); Claudia Ortiz (V); Alexia Rivas (NI); Elisa Rosales (NI); Dennis Salinas (NI); Marcela Villatoro (ARENA); Benjamín Zavaleta (NI)	16	783	246,168	741,094	
2027	To be determined					6	TBD	TBD	1,098,986	

== See also ==
- Elections in El Salvador
