= Rafael Montalvo =

Rafael Montalvo may refer to:

- Rafael Montalvo (baseball)
- Rafael Montalvo (politician)
