= 2024 Salvadoran presidential election =

- 4 February 2024
- Opinion polls
- Registered: 6,214,399
- Turnout: 52.60% (▲0.72pp)
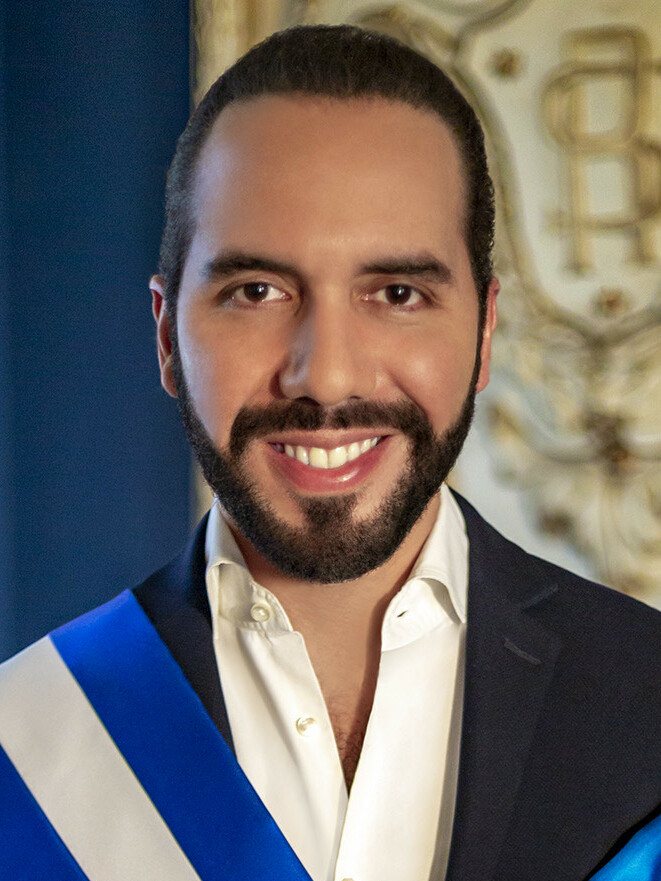

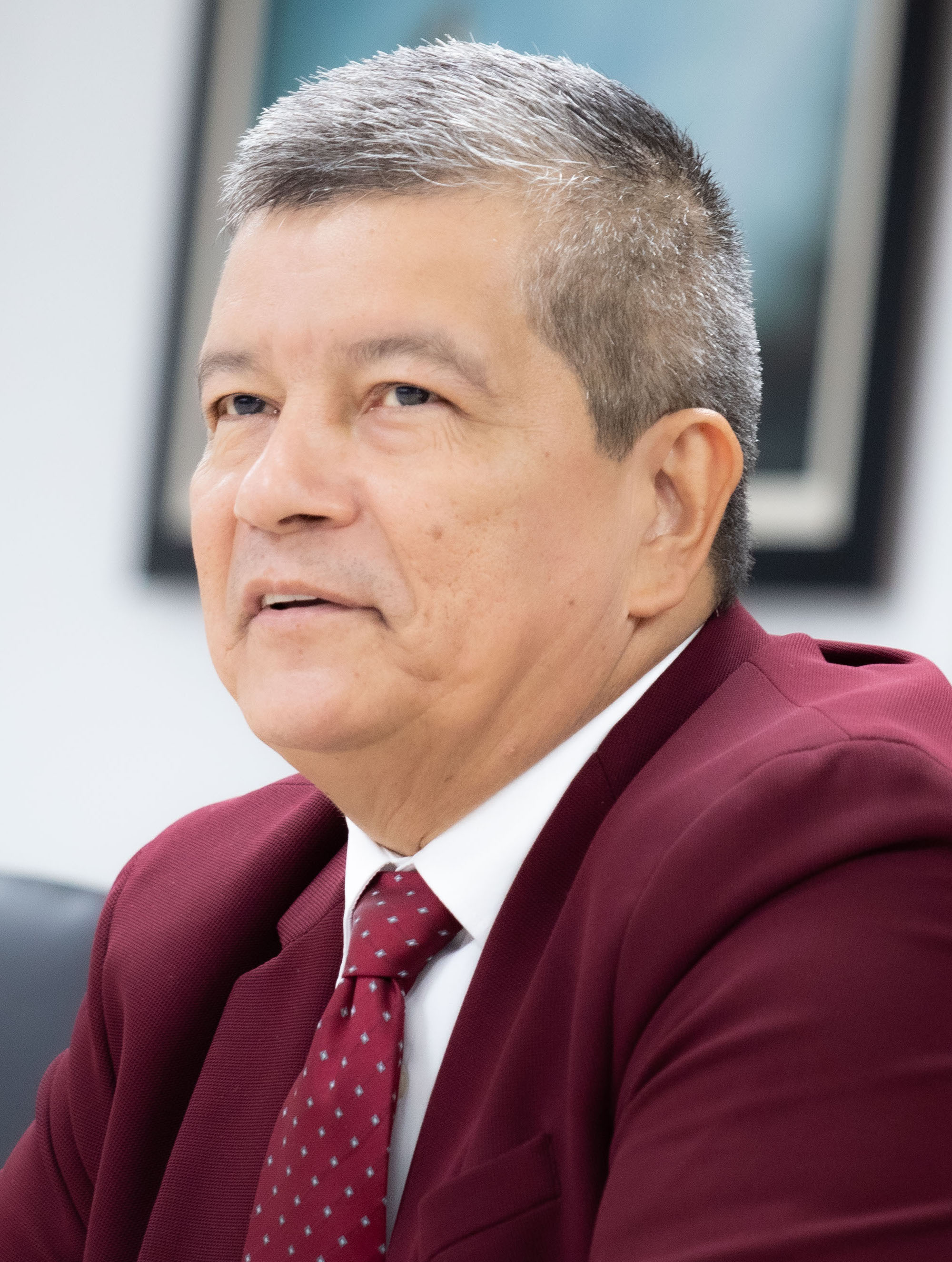

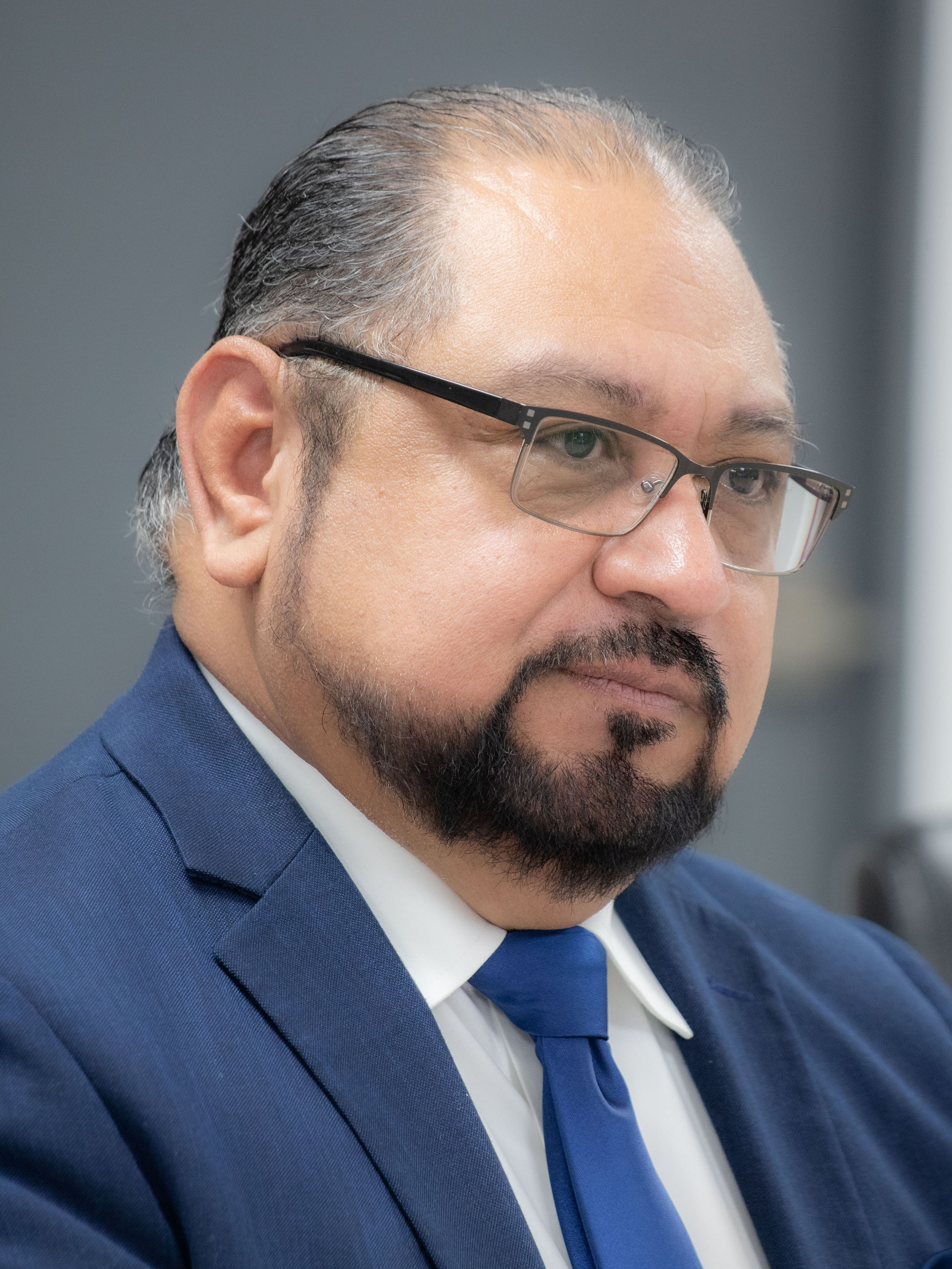
Candidate	Nayib Bukele	Manuel Flores	Joel Sánchez
Party	NI	FMLN	ARENA
Running mate	Félix Ulloa	Werner Marroquín	Hilcia Bonilla
Popular vote	2,701,725	204,167	177,881
Percentage	84.65%	6.40%	5.57%
- Results by department
President before election
Nayib Bukele (Note: Nayib Bukele was granted a leave of absence by the Legislative Assembly on 30 November 2023. The Legislative Assembly appointed Claudia Rodríguez de Guevara, Bukele's private secretary, as presidential designee for a six month period until the end of the presidential term on 1 June 2024.)
NI
Elected President
Nayib Bukele
NI

Presidential elections were held in El Salvador on 4 February 2024. Voters elected the country's president and vice president to serve a five-year term. El Salvador used a two-round system, and if no candidate reached an absolute majority, a second round would have occurred on 3 March 2024. The presidential election occurred concurrently with legislative elections.

Thirteen political parties were registered with the Supreme Electoral Court (TSE) making them eligible to participate in the election. Of those, only 7 parties ran candidates, of which 6 were on the ballot. Incumbent president Nayib Bukele ran for re-election with Nuevas Ideas. (Note: Bukele's re-election campaign with Nuevas Ideas was supported by the Grand Alliance for National Unity (GANA), the Christian Democratic Party (PDC), the National Coalition Party (PCN), and Democratic Change (CD).) His candidacy was controversial as the country's constitution prohibited immediate re-election, but in September 2021, the Supreme Court of Justice ruled that the incumbent president could run for immediate re-election. Various lawyers, journalists, and opposition politicians criticized Bukele's re-election bid as authoritarian and unconstitutional, while most Salvadorans remained highly supportive of his campaign. The other five candidates were Manuel Flores of the Farabundo Martí National Liberation Front (FMLN), Joel Sánchez of the Nationalist Republican Alliance (ARENA), Luis Parada of Nuestro Tiempo, Javier Renderos of Solidary Force, Marina Murillo of the Salvadoran Patriotic Fraternity (FPS).

On election night, Bukele declared himself the winner of the election. The TSE encountered technical difficulties in the counting process and had to conduct a recount. A few days after election night, the TSE confirmed Bukele's victory. Its final results showed that Bukele won 84.65 percent of the popular vote in a landslide victory. Flores finished in second with 6.40 percent, Sánchez came in third with 5.57 percent, and the remaining candidates each received less than 5 percent. Bukele and Ulloa were inaugurated on 1 June. Bukele was the first president of El Salvador to be re-elected since Brigadier General Maximiliano Hernández Martínez in 1944.

== Political background ==
=== Presidency of Nayib Bukele ===
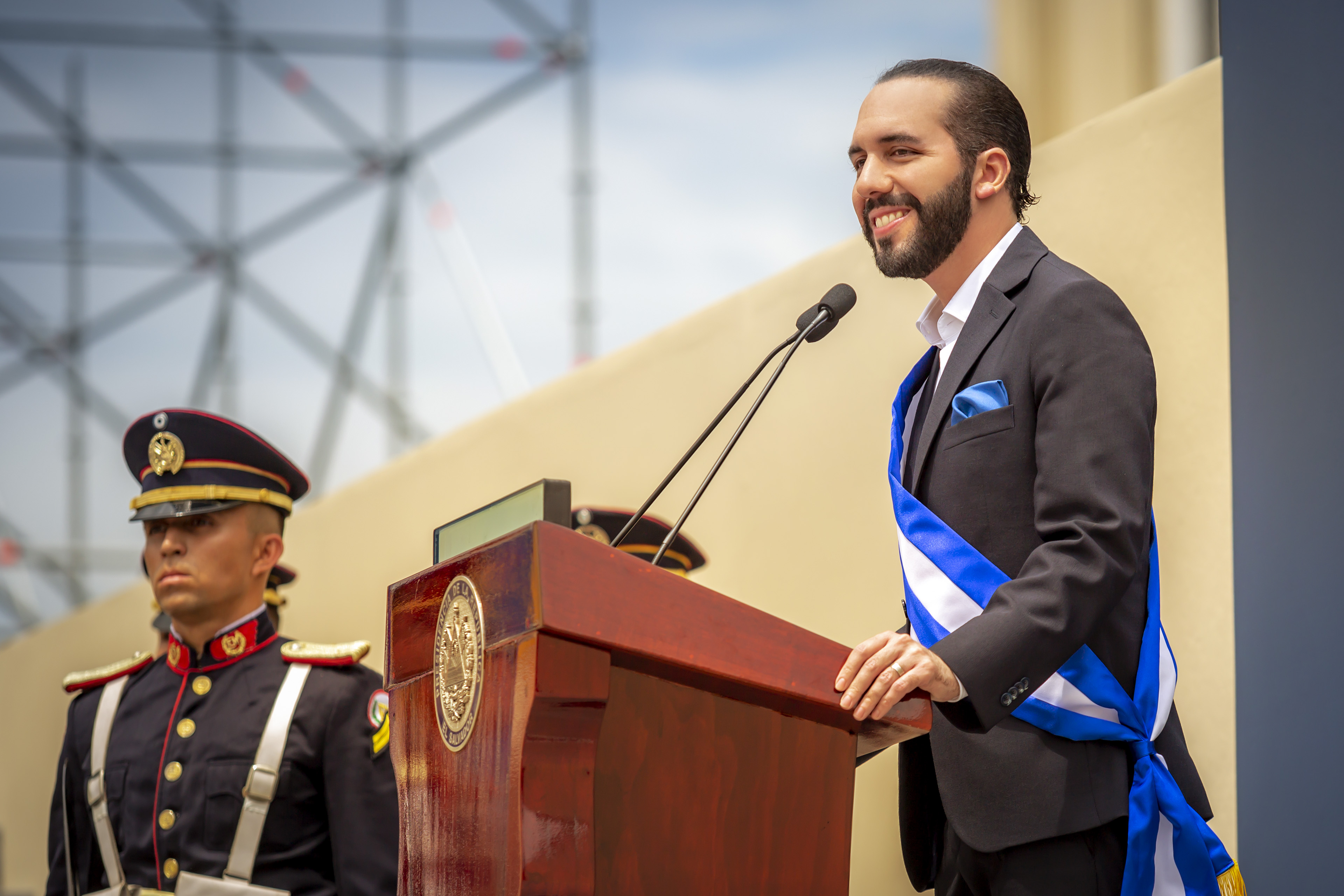
Nayib Bukele speaking on 1 June 2019, the day of his first inauguration

Nayib Bukele, a former mayor of San Salvador, won the 2019 Salvadoran presidential election with 53 percent of the vote. He ran under the banner of the Grand Alliance for National Unity (GANA), making him the first president of El Salvador since José Napoleón Duarte (1984–1989) to not be a member of one of the country's two largest political parties: the right-wing Nationalist Republican Alliance (ARENA) and the left-wing Farabundo Martí National Liberation Front (FMLN). Bukele's election broke the country's two-party system.

Throughout Bukele's presidency, his government was described as authoritarian and autocratic, resulting in what many journalists described as democratic backsliding. In February 2020, Bukele sent 40 soldiers into the Legislative Assembly to pressure lawmakers to approve a US$109 million loan to fund the Territorial Control Plan, a security program initiated by Bukele, in what critics described as an attempted coup d'état. In September 2020, the newspaper El Faro accused Bukele's government of negotiating with criminal gangs in the country, notably Mara Salvatrucha (MS-13) and the 18th Street gang, to lower crime rates. Bukele and his government denied those accusations. In the 2021 legislative election, Nuevas Ideas, the political party Bukele established, won supermajorities in the Legislative Assembly, municipalities, and the Central American Parliament (PARLACEN). The 13th session of the Legislative Assembly assumed office on 1 May 2021 and Bukele's allies voted to remove Attorney General Raúl Melara and five justices from the Constitutional Court of the Supreme Court of Justice. Bukele later appointed a new Attorney General and new justices in what has since been described as a self-coup.

Following a spike in murders in March 2022, Bukele's government began a gang crackdown, referred to as a state of exception and a war against gangs, which resulted in the reported arrests of over 75,163 alleged gang members by 11 January 2024 and 144 to 152 deaths in custody by 10 May 2023. The crackdown, which had since been extended several times, was accused of engaging in arbitrary arrests, torture, and human rights abuses by organizations such as Amnesty International and Human Rights Watch. Opposition politicians described the crackdown as a political and electoral strategy to support the government and intimidate the opposition.

Bukele remained extremely popular with approval ratings consistently hovering between 80 and 90 percent. He was considered to be one of the most popular presidents in El Salvador's history as well as one of the most popular incumbent Latin American heads of state.

=== Presidential re-election controversy ===
"Practically all developed countries have re-election ... prohibitions on re-election only exist in the Third World, coincidentally." ("Prácticamente todos los países desarrollados tienen reelección ... las prohibiciones de reelección solo existen en el tercer mundo, coincidentalmente.")

— Nayib Bukele, 15 September 2022

External video
- Bukele's speech where he announced he is running for re-election in 2024 (at 34:00)

On 3 September 2021, the Supreme Court of Justice ruled that the president of El Salvador is eligible to run for re-election in consecutive terms, discarding a 2014 ruling that required presidents to wait ten years before running for re-election. The court interpreted the constitution's ban on re-election as only applying to the president and not the candidates. Additionally, article 156 of the constitution prohibited anyone holding the presidency in the six months prior to the next presidential term from holding the office in the next term. The court interpreted it as permitting the president to seek re-election if they resigned or obtained a leave of office before those six months. These rulings and interpretations made Bukele eligible to run for president in 2024. The Supreme Electoral Court (TSE) accepted the Supreme Court of Justice's ruling despite criticism from ARENA and the FMLN as well as U.S. chargé d'affaires to El Salvador Jean Elizabeth Manes.

On 15 September 2022, Bukele announced his re-election campaign despite having previously voiced his opposition to immediate re-election both before and during his presidency. Bukele justified his re-election bid by arguing that most developed countries allow re-election. He also claimed that restrictions on re-election only exists in third-world countries. According to Bukele, a developed country criticizing his announcement would be hypocritical. On 25 June 2023, Bukele registered his pre-candidacy for the presidency with Nuevas Ideas, and on 9 July, Nuevas Ideas elected Bukele as its presidential candidate.

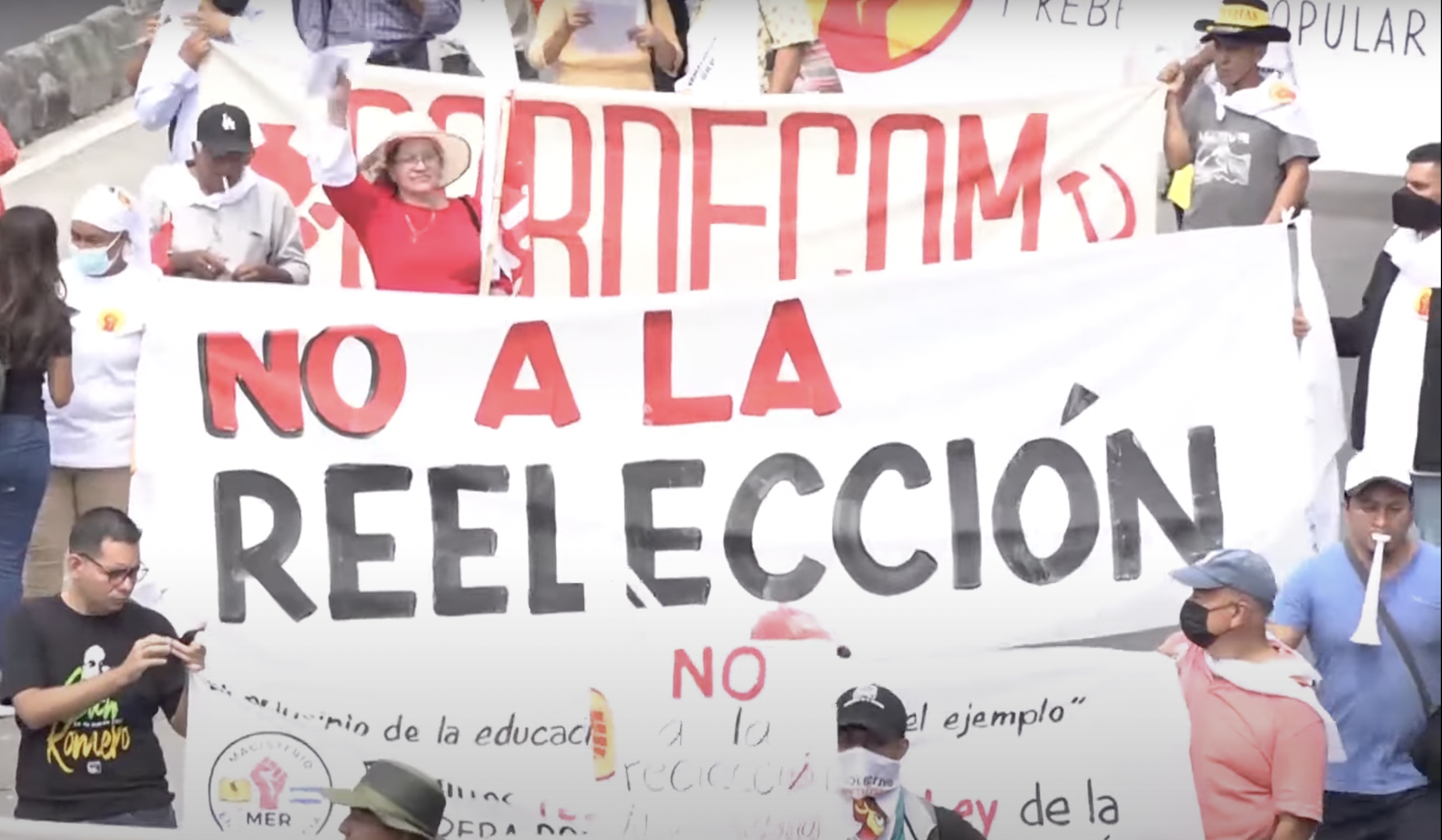
Protesters holding a banner reading "No to Re-Election"

Bukele's announcement that he was running for re-election was criticized by constitutional lawyers who argued his re-election would be unconstitutional and violate at least four articles of El Salvador's constitution. Manuel Flores, then the FMLN's presidential pre-candidate, stated that "the law is the law [and] the law says that there is no re-election" ("la ley es la ley [y] la ley dice que no hay reelección"), adding that the constitution is "clear" ("clara") in prohibiting re-election. Protest marches against Bukele's government and against his re-election bid were held in San Salvador on 1 May and 15 September 2023. Flores, Joel Sánchez, and Luis Parada (the presidential candidates of the FMLN, ARENA, and Nuestro Tiempo, respectively) participated in the latter protest march.

In October and November 2023, Nuestro Tiempo, ARENA, and various NGOs filed ten requests with the TSE calling for the body to not register Bukele's presidential candidacy or void his candidacy after he initiated the registration process. On 9 November, the TSE reaffirmed that Bukele's candidacy was legal and dismissed all the petitions to void his candidacy.

On 30 November, to abide by article 156 of the constitution, Bukele was granted a leave of absence by the Legislative Assembly. Claudia Rodríguez de Guevara, Bukele's private secretary, was named as the presidential designate. (Note: In El Salvador, a "designate" ("designado") is someone appointed by the Legislative Assembly to be next in the line of succession to the presidency after the president and vice president. The Legislative Assembly can appoint up to two designates.) She assumed office the following day. Rodríguez was the first woman in Salvadoran history to hold presidential powers, although she never held the office of President.

== Electoral system ==
=== Election procedure ===
A presidential election was held in El Salvador five years after the 2019 presidential election. The president and vice president were elected through a popular vote and El Salvador's constitution mandated that the election was "free, direct, equal and secret". The election was held 4 February 2024, concurrent with legislative elections. If a second round had been necessary, it would have occurred on 3 March. To win the election, a candidate needed an absolute majority (50% + 1). If no candidate received an absolute majority, a second round between the two candidates with the most valid votes would have occurred within 30 days of the first round. Presidential and vice presidential candidates had to be at least 30 years old and be Salvadoran citizens by birth.

Electronic voting for Salvadoran expatriates began at midnight on 6 January 2024. (Note: On 18 October 2022, the Legislative Assembly passed the Special Law for the Exercise of Suffrage in the Exterior that allowed Salvadorans living outside of the country to vote electronically in the presidential and concurrent legislative elections.) Expatriates were able to vote at 81 voting centers in 60 of the country's embassies and consulates in 30 countries. Voting in El Salvador was held from 7 a.m. to 5 p.m. CST. A total of 1,595 voting centers were available across the country. Voting was not compulsory. There were a total of 6,214,399 registered voters. Guillermo Wellman, a magistrate of the TSE, stated that individuals arrested during the country's gang crackdown were ineligible to vote.

=== Political parties ===
Political parties had to be registered with the TSE to be able to participate in 2024 presidential election. The following table shows the thirteen political parties that were eligible to register candidates with the TSE and whether or not they registered presidential and vice presidential candidates.

Party		Leader	Participated?
PDC	Christian Democratic Party; Partido Demócrata Cristiano	Reinaldo Carballo	No (Note: Endorsed Nuevas Ideas' candidates.)
CD	Democratic Change; Cambio Democrático	Javier Milián	No
FMLN	Farabundo Martí National Liberation Front; Frente Farabundo Martí para la Liberación Nacional	Óscar Ortiz	Yes
GANA	Grand Alliance for National Unity; Gran Alianza por la Unidad Nacional	Nelson Guardado	No
V	Let's Go; Vamos	Cesia Rivas	No
PCN	National Coalition Party; Partido de Concertación Nacional	Manuel Rodríguez	No
ARENA	Nationalist Republican Alliance; Alianza Republicana Nacionalista	Carlos García Saade	Yes
NI	New Ideas; Nuevas Ideas	Xavier Zablah Bukele	Yes
NT	Our Time; Nuestro Tiempo	Andy Failer	Yes
DS	Salvadoran Democracy; Democracia Salvadoreña	Adolfo Salume Artiñano	No
PAIS	Salvadoran Independent Party; Partido Independiente Salvadoreño	Roy García	No (Note: Candidate rejected by the Supreme Electoral Court.)
FPS	Salvadoran Patriotic Fraternity; Fraternidad Patriota Salvadoreña	Óscar Morales Lemus	Yes
FS	Solidary Force; Fuerza Solidaria	Rigoberto Soto	Yes

== Candidates ==
=== Registered candidates ===
Six political parties had their 2024 presidential and vice presidential candidates registered by the TSE.

Party	Candidate		Running mate		Date nominated	Date registered
Nuevas Ideas Nuevas Ideas	Nayib Bukele	Nayib Bukele; 43rd President of El Salvador (2019–present); Mayor of San Salvador (2015–2018); Mayor of Nuevo Cuscatlán (2012–2015)	Félix Ulloa	Félix Ulloa; 50th Vice President of El Salvador (2019–present)	9 July 2023	3 November 2023
Nationalist Republican Alliance Nationalist; Republican; Alliance	Joel Sánchez	Joel Sánchez	Hilcia Bonilla	Hilcia Bonilla	16 July 2023	9 November 2023
Farabundo Martí National Liberation Front Farabundo Martí; National Liberation; Front	Manuel Flores	Manuel Flores; Deputy of the Legislative Assembly (2012–2021); Mayor of Quezaltepeque (2003–2012)	Werner Marroquín	Werner Marroquín	16 July 2023	3 November 2023
Nuestro Tiempo Nuestro Tiempo	Luis Parada	Luis Parada	Celia Medrano	Celia Medrano	15 July 2023	9 November 2023
Solidary Force Solidary Force	Javier Renderos	Javier Renderos	Rafael Montalvo	Rafael Montalvo; Deputy of the Legislative Assembly (1988–1991)	24 July 2023	9 November 2023
Salvadoran Patriotic Fraternity Salvadoran; Patriotic; Fraternity	Marina Murillo	Marina Murillo	Fausto Carranza	Fausto Carranza	27 August 2023	9 November 2023

=== Rejected candidates ===
One party's presidential and vice presidential candidates were rejected by the TSE.

Party	Candidate		Running mate		Date nominated	Date rejected
Salvadoran Independent Party Salvadoran; Independent; Party	José Cardoza	José Cardoza	Irma Sosa	Irma Sosa	28 August 2023	4 October 2023

=== Withdrawn candidates ===
- Gerardo Awad, 2019 ARENA presidential pre-candidate
- Jaime Zavaleta

=== Declined to be candidates ===
- Claudia Ortiz, deputy of the Legislative Assembly (2021–present)
- Mario Vega, senior pastor of Misión Cristiana Elim Internacional (1997–present)

== Electoral campaign ==
=== Nuevas Ideas ===
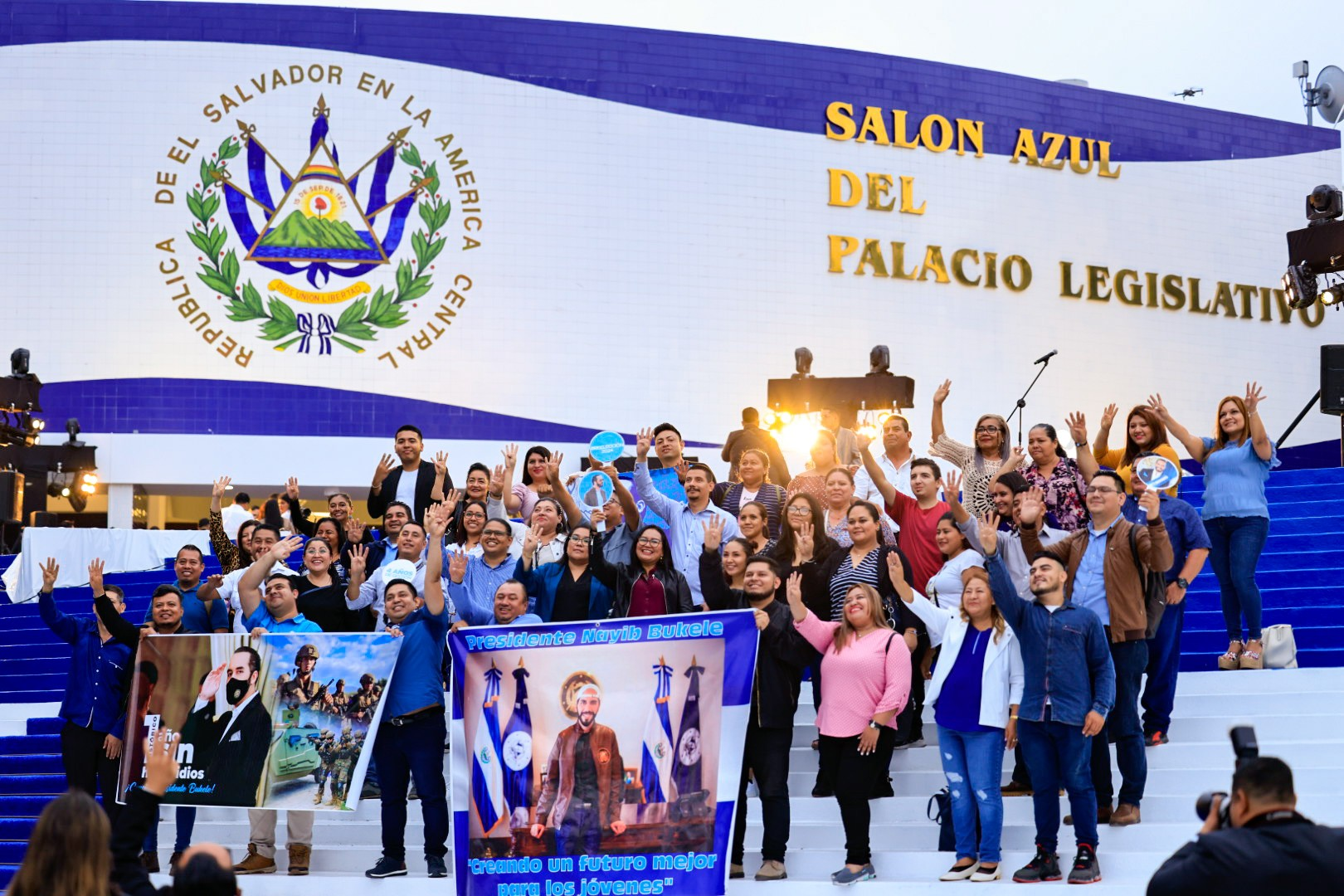
A crowd of Bukele supporters in front of the Legislative Assembly's meeting room

On 25 June 2023, Bukele and Ulloa registered their pre-candidacies with Nuevas Ideas for President and Vice President, respectively. On 9 July, Nuevas Ideas formalized Bukele and Ulloa's presidential and vice presidential campaigns. They ran unopposed in the party's primary election and won 44,398 votes. The TSE approved Bukele and Ulloa's candidacies on 3 November.

Bukele called on his supporters to win a three-fourths majority for Nuevas Ideas in the concurrent Legislative Assembly election in order to allow him to maintain the gang crackdown during his second term. Bukele's campaign relied heavily on social media promotion. In a video message, Bukele claimed that if Nuevas Ideas lost one seat, the opposition would "liberate the gang members and use them to rise to power" ("liberar a los pandilleros y ocuparlos para llegar al poder"), although opposition politicians have denied such claims. In a message posted on social media, Bukele claimed that people who continue to believe in and vote for the opposition "do not see, because they do not want to see; they will not change" ("no ve, porque no quiere ver; no cambiará"). Bukele stated that he was willing to work with the international community as long as they respected El Salvador as a partner rather than as subservient, adding that El Salvador could "change". Bukele promised to intensify his security policies, improve the country's infrastructure, and promote tourism.

=== Nationalist Republican Alliance ===
Ahead of the ARENA's July 2023 primary elections, Carlos García Saade, the leader of ARENA, stated that the presidential pre-candidates' names would not be disclosed for their safety, claiming that they were threatened by persons in government and by governmental institutions. On 16 July, ARENA elected Joel Sánchez, a businessman living in the United States, and Hilcia Bonilla, a businesswoman living in the United States, as its presidential and vice presidential candidates, respectively. Sánchez's candidacy was proposed by the Citizen Resistance civil movement the month prior. Initially, Sánchez's running mate was Hardy García, the wife of Salvadoran Independent Party (PAIS) leader Roy García, but she withdrew her candidacy because she had received "threats". Sánchez's candidacy was independently proposed by the Citizen Resistance civil movement prior to being selected by ARENA.

On 25 July 2023, Sánchez stated that he would be willing to renounce his presidential candidacy if it was what "our country and our population wanted" ("deseo de nuestro país y de nuestra población") in order for find a more "suitable" candidate. Following the publication of a Francisco Gavidia University (UFG) opinion poll in late-August 2023 which listed Sánchez as having 4.3 percent support, Julia Evelyn Martínez, a former professor at the Central American University, stated that Sánchez was considering withdrawing his candidacy due to his low polling figures. In September 2023, García Saade stated that he believed that Sánchez would be able to win the presidency in the second round. On 9 November, the TSE approved Sánchez and Bonilla's candidacies.

Sánchez stated that the state of exception "has to be stopped" ("tiene que ser cesado"), elaborating that it "opens the opportunity to carry out abuses, corruption, [and] influence peddling" ("abre la oportunidad para llevar a cabo abusos, corrupción, tráfico de influencias"). Sánchez promised to review economic, taxation, educational, and agricultural policies to determine which ones were succeeding and which were failing. He described the adoption of bitcoin as legal tender as "the worst decision [Bukele's] government could have made" ("fue la peor decisión que este gobierno pueda haber hecho"), stating that it resulted in the International Monetary Fund refusing to support El Salvador and the government losing millions of dollars. Sánchez and Bonilla stated that they would promote investment by "establishing a judicial system that works" ("establecer nuestro sistema jurídico que funcione"), and Sánchez claimed that he was already in talks with potential unspecified investors. Sánchez supported restoring diplomatic relations with Taiwan as he believes that Taiwan was a "better ally" than China, citing better exchange student programs and trade deals with the country before relations were severed in 2018. He opposed reducing the number of municipalities, (Note: In June 2023, the Legislative Assembly of El Salvador approved a proposal by Bukele to reduce the number of municipalities from 262 to 44. The reductions would go into effect on 1 May 2024.) arguing that it would result in parts of the country being neglected by mayors.

=== Farabundo Martí National Liberation Front ===
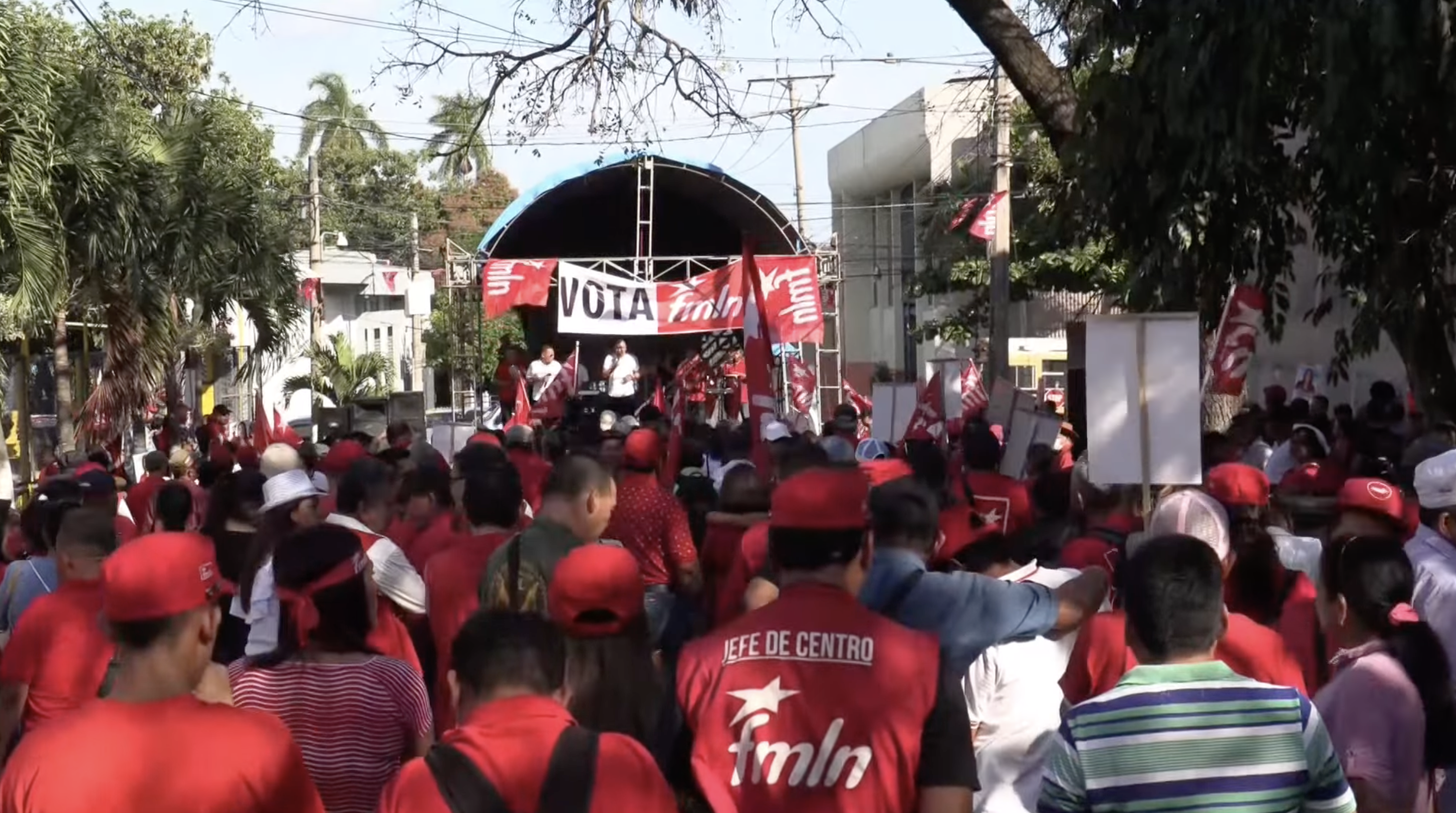
A January 2024 FMLN rally

On 29 May 2023, Flores registered as a pre-candidate for the presidency and Werner Marroquín registered as his running-mate. Flores was the party's only presidential pre-candidate to register, although Jaime Zavaleta expressed interest in securing the party's nomination. On 16 July 2023, Flores and Marroquín were elected as the FMLN's presidential and vice presidential candidates, respectively. The TSE approved Flores and Marroquín's candidacies on 3 November. FMLN leader Óscar Ortiz assured that the party's candidates represented the "hope and future of the country" ("esperanza y el futuro del país").

In September 2023, Flores stated that, if elected, he would maintain the state of exception if the country's population supported it. He also stated that all criminals would remain imprisoned and that his government would pursue others, countering claims that the party defended criminals. Regarding corruption, Flores stated that he would combat corruption and not select corrupt individuals to cabinet positions.

Flores promised to invest US$30 million in the transportation sector and reduce the price of transportation fares for students by half, which would affect around 150,000 students in the country. Flores promised to launch the "Zero Hunger" ("Hambre Cero") initiative to combat hunger by investing US$60 million into building three "zero-hunger supply centers" ("centros de abastecimiento hambre cero") which would distribute grain. Flores also proposed raising the minimum pension from US$50 per day to US$70 per day. He announced his "Prosperous Municipalities" ("Municipios Prósperos") plan to develop and invest in the country's municipalities. Flores promised to launch investigations into all of Bukele's government officials if elected president. In October 2023, Flores stated that he believed he would win the presidential election in the first round, making a second round irrelevant.

=== Nuestro Tiempo ===
On 31 May 2023, Luis Parada, a lawyer who resided in the United States, announced that he was running for president. His candidacy was proposed by the Sumar por El Salvador political movement. Celia Medrano, a human rights lawyer, was Parada's running mate. The following day, during an interview with Telecorporación Salvadoreña's Frente a Frente, Failer confirmed that Parada and Medrano were both running under the banner of Nuestro Tiempo, adding that "it's to choose between democracy and dictatorship; if we unite ourselves behind this, we will change what is happening to our country" ("es para elegir entre democracia y dictadura; si nos unimos detrás de eso, vamos a cambiar lo que está pasando en nuestro país"). Parada had previously sought ARENA's 2019 presidential nomination. On 9 November, the TSE approved Parada and Medrano's candidacies.

In an interview with Channel 9 in July 2023, Parada stated that, if elected, he would review the necessity and constitutionality of the state of exception. In August 2023, Parada stated that he would suspend the state of exception, describing it as "nothing more than the current government's propaganda" ("nada más la propaganda del Gobierno actual"), and an "illusion". Parada promised to remove the justices on the Constitutional Court of the Supreme Court of Justice and restore the justices that the Legislative Assembly removed on 1 May 2021. Nuestro Tiempo portrayed itself as an alternative to the country's traditional political parties.

=== Salvadoran Independent Party ===
Gerardo Awad, a former presidential pre-candidate for ARENA in 2019, sought to run a presidential campaign with the Salvadoran Independent Party, but PAIS refused to allow him to run. Awad later announced that he would no longer seek to run for president with PAIS. Awad invited Mario Vega, the senior pastor of Misión Cristiana Elim Internacional, to be his vice presidential candidate, but Vega declined Awad's offer and stated that he did not intend to seek any public office during the 2024 election. On 4 June 2023, Awad announced his withdrawal from the 2024 election as he did not believe that conditions were favorable for his campaign, but he stated that he would prepare for a new presidential campaign in 2029.

On 28 August 2023, PAIS deputy secretary Carlos Molina announced that it selected José Cardoza, an agricultural engineer, as its presidential candidate and Irma Sosa as its vice presidential candidate. Roy García, the party's leader, stated on Facebook that Molina's announcement was not legitimate and that all of the party's candidates were invalid. He added that the party should wait and reorganize for the 2027 legislative election. On 4 October, the TSE passed a resolution to deregister the party and bar it from participating in the 2024 election, rejecting its candidates in the process. Cardoza denounced the resolution stating that it was undemocratic. Meanwhile, Roy García reiterated that PAIS should wait to participate in the 2027 legislative election as he believed that the party had no chance in winning the 2024 election and was in danger of falling into irrelevance.

=== Other parties ===
The Salvadoran Patriotic Fraternity (FPS) selected Marina Murillo, an architect, as its presidential candidate and Fausto Carranza as its vice presidential candidate. Murillo is the first woman to run for president of El Salvador since Rina Escalante ran with the Authentic Democratic Christian Movement in the 1994 presidential election. Solidary Force announced that Javier Renderos, an obstetrician, would be its presidential candidate and that Rafael Montalvo, an agriculturist and former ARENA deputy of the Legislative Assembly, would be its vice presidential candidate. Both parties' candidates were approved by the TSE on 9 November 2023.

Prior to Bukele's registration as a presidential pre-candidate with Nuevas Ideas on 26 June 2023, some Grand Alliance for National Unity (GANA) leaders believed that Bukele could seek re-election with GANA rather than Nuevas Ideas as he was initially elected in 2019 as a member of GANA. In July 2022, Guillermo Gallegos, a deputy of GANA in the Legislative Assembly, stated that the party would endorse Bukele's re-election campaign if he ran under the banner of another party instead of GANA. On 16 June 2023, Gallegos stated that GANA would not participate in the presidential election unless Bukele was the party's candidate. On 26 June, Gallegos confirmed that GANA would not run a presidential or vice presidential candidate, stating that the party supported Bukele's re-election campaign.

On 5 March 2023, Vamos formally announced that it would not run a presidential candidate or compete in the PARLACEN elections. Claudia Ortiz announced her intention to be re-elected as a deputy of the Legislative Assembly and that she would not seek a presidential candidacy. She later added that winning control of the Legislative Assembly was more important that winning the presidency and that she would fight throughout the next presidential term.

In 2023, both the Christian Democratic Party's (PDC) and National Coalition Party (PCN) announced that neither would field presidential candidates. On 16 July 2023, the PDC declared its support for Bukele's presidential campaign, and the PCN did the same on 30 January 2024. Democratic Change did not select a presidential candidate, instead endorsing Bukele's re-election campaign. Salvadoran Democracy did not participate in the 2024 election.

== Opinion polls ==
Various groups such as CIESCA, Fundaungo, the Francisco Gavidia University, La Prensa Gráfica, and TResearch conducted opinion polling prior to the 2024 presidential election. Virtually every poll indicated significant leads for Bukele. Additionally, opinion polling was conducted to ask whether Salvadorans supported Bukele's re-election; virtually every poll indicated that a large majority of Salvadorans would support Bukele's re-election. Many Salvadoran Americans also supported Bukele's re-election. Those who supported Bukele's re-election believed that his continuity in office was necessary to preserve the security policies he implemented. Conversely, opponents of re-election argued that re-election itself was a threat to democracy.

Local regression of polls conducted for the 2024 Salvadoran presidential election

== Results ==
The TSE published the presidential election's final results on 9 February 2024 and formally ratified the results on 17 February; Bukele (NI) won with 84.65 percent of the vote accounting for around 43 percent of all registered voters. Bukele was the first presidential candidate in Salvadoran history to receive more than two million votes. Among the other candidates, Flores (FMLN) received 6.40 percent of the vote, Sánchez (ARENA) received 5.57 percent, Parada (NT) received 2.04 percent, and Renderos (FS) and Murillo (FPS) each received less than 1 percent. Turnout was 52.60 percent.

Candidate	Running mate	Party	Votes	%
Nayib Bukele	Félix Ulloa	Nuevas Ideas	2,701,725	84.65
Manuel Flores	Werner Marroquín	Farabundo Martí National Liberation Front	204,167	6.40
Joel Sánchez	Hilcia Bonilla	Nationalist Republican Alliance	177,881	5.57
Luis Parada	Celia Medrano	Nuestro Tiempo	65,076	2.04
Javier Renderos	Rafael Montalvo	Solidary Force	23,473	0.74
Marina Murillo	Fausto Carranza	Salvadoran Patriotic Fraternity	19,293	0.60
Total			3,191,615	100.00
Valid votes			3,191,615	97.65
Invalid votes			61,787	1.89
Blank votes			15,064	0.46
Total votes			3,268,466	100.00
Registered voters/turnout			6,214,399	52.60
Source: TSE at the Wayback Machine (archived 23 February 2024)

=== Results by department ===
The following table displays the number of votes each candidate received from each of the country's 14 departments as well as from the exterior vote. The candidate with the most votes in a department is highlighted in their party's color and the runner-up in a department is in gray.

Department	Bukele		Flores		Sánchez		Parada		Renderos		Murillo		Blank/invalid	Total
Department	Votes	%	Votes	%	Votes	%	Votes	%	Votes	%	Votes	%	Votes	Votes
Ahuachapán	141,263	84.94	9,355	5.62	11,568	6.96	1,463	0.88	1,754	1.05	911	0.55	5,186	171,500
Cabañas	49,916	81.43	5,122	8.36	4,984	8.13	556	0.91	360	0.59	364	0.59	2,487	63,789
Chalatenango	67,309	74.96	13,029	14.51	7,502	8.35	886	0.99	516	0.57	551	0.61	3,675	93,468
Cuscatlán	99,970	81.32	10,288	8.37	10,078	8.20	1,384	1.13	529	0.43	690	0.56	3,226	126,165
La Libertad	302,425	81.29	20,725	5.57	27,208	7.31	16,197	4.35	2,745	0.74	2,744	0.74	9,396	381,440
La Paz	121,780	83.35	9,582	6.56	10,334	7.07	1,487	1.02	1,968	1.35	961	0.66	3,615	149,727
La Unión	86,077	90.25	4,260	4.47	4,040	4.24	400	0.42	366	0.38	234	0.25	2,764	98,141
Morazán	61,079	78.75	10,905	14.06	4,586	5.91	339	0.44	361	0.47	289	0.37	3,150	80,709
San Miguel	159,060	85.83	14,262	7.70	6,811	3.68	1,651	0.89	2,573	1.39	960	0.52	5,254	190,571
San Salvador	702,023	82.62	54,496	6.41	50,165	5.90	30,956	3.64	4,930	0.58	7,121	0.84	18,198	867,889
Santa Ana	227,316	87.44	11,578	4.45	12,968	4.99	3,976	1.53	2,429	0.93	1,695	0.65	7,058	267,020
San Vicente	56,028	79.29	7,827	11.08	5,147	7.28	598	0.85	687	0.97	375	0.53	2,000	72,662
Sonsonate	188,162	83.76	14,920	6.64	15,107	6.73	2,546	1.13	2,251	1.00	1,649	0.73	6,213	230,848
Usulután	116,672	83.18	14,965	10.67	5,445	3.88	811	0.58	1,829	1.30	536	0.38	4,047	144,305
Exterior vote	322,645	97.87	2,854	0.87	1,938	0.59	1,826	0.55	175	0.05	213	0.06	582	330,233
Total	2,701,725	84.65	204,167	6.40	177,881	5.57	65,076	2.04	23,473	0.74	19,293	0.60	76,851	3,268,466

== Aftermath ==
=== Domestic reactions ===
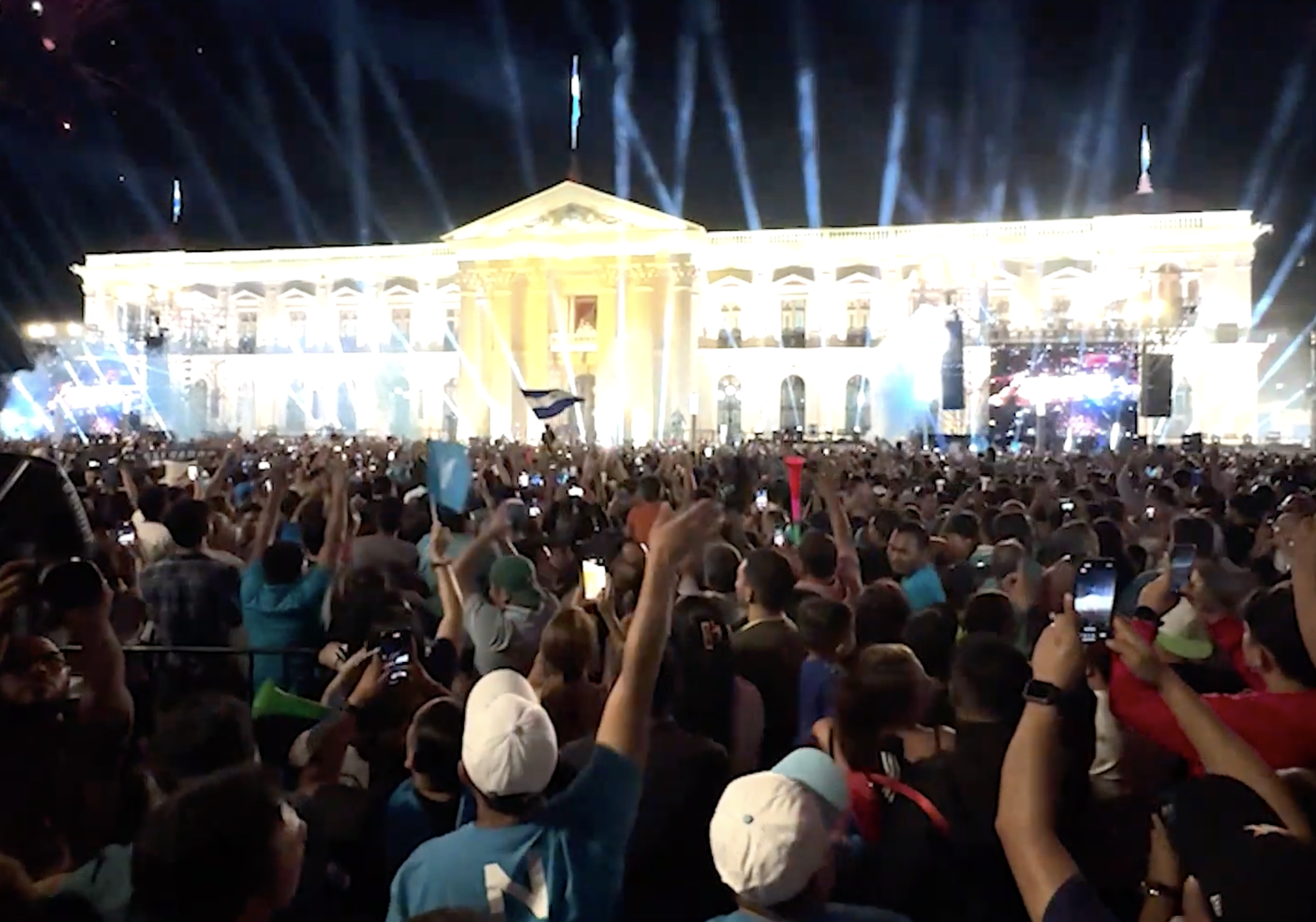
A crowd of Bukele's supporters in front of the National Palace on election night

Shortly after polling stations closed but before the TSE officially announced the results of the election, Bukele declared on X that, "according to our numbers", he had won the presidential election with "more than 85% of the votes". He also claimed that his electoral victory was "a record in the entire democratic history of the world" and that the 2024 election was "the first time in history that El Salvador has democracy, and it's not me saying it, it's the people". A crowd of Bukele's supporters gathered at the Plaza Gerardo Barrios in San Salvador to celebrate his victory. Bukele later addressed the crowd from the balcony of the National Palace and celebrated his victory in a speech, during which he criticized journalists who themselves had criticized the gang crackdown and his concentration of power. Bukele also remarked that the election results was "the first time in a country that just one party exists in a completely democratic system", adding that "the entire opposition together was pulverized".

Former FMLN Salvadoran president Mauricio Funes stated that the opposition was defeated "without a doubt" ("no cabe ninguna duda"). In a press conference on 4 February 2024, Flores stated that the FMLN would not disappear as a political entity and that it was "not correct" ("no es correcto") for Bukele to declare himself the election's winner before the TSE made an official announcement. Óscar Ortiz thanked those who voted for Flores and stated that "history does not end here" ("la historia no termina acá"). Flores did not concede and later claimed that he had votes stolen from him. On 5 February, Claudia Ortiz stated that "democratic spaces are closing in El Salvador, civil society is closing down and there is an environment of fear to speak out". On 7 February, Sánchez conceded the election and congratulated Bukele on his victory.

=== International reactions ===
Bernardo Arévalo, the president of Guatemala; Xiomara Castro, the president of Honduras; Daniel Ortega, the president of Nicaragua; Laurentino Cortizo, the president of Panama; Miguel Díaz-Canel, the first secretary of the Communist Party of Cuba; Xi Jinping, the general secretary of the Chinese Communist Party; Vladimir Putin, the president of Russia; and Alicia Bárcena Ibarra, the secretary of foreign affairs of Mexico, congratulated Bukele on X after he declared himself as the election's winner. The Chilean and Chinese embassies in El Salvador also congratulated Bukele before the release of the official results, as did the United Nations. The Ministry of Foreign Affairs, International Trade and Worship of Argentina congratulated Bukele and reaffirmed commitment for both countries to work together.

United States Secretary of State Antony Blinken congratulated Bukele on X, stating that "the events in El Salvador have a direct impact on the interests of the United States" and that the American and Salvadoran governments could "reach our maximum potential and surpass major obstacles in our hemisphere and on a global level" through cooperation. William H. Duncan, the United States ambassador to El Salvador, congratulated Bukele, adding that he hoped to "continue working with representatives of the Salvadoran people elected to fortify democracy, increase economic opportunities, and confront the shared challenges of the 21st century". Several members of the Democratic Party in the United States Senate congratulated Bukele's victory, but expressed that they were "troubled" regarding "unconstitutional moves that strongly influenced the outcome of Sunday's election" and statements made by Ulloa regarding "'eliminating' and 'replacing' democracy". Republican senators Ted Cruz and Marco Rubio also congratulated Bukele.

On 5 February 2024, several foreign news publications called the presidential election for Bukele, describing it as a "landslide victory". Foreign news publications also described Nuevas Ideas' concurrent legislative victory, in which the party won 54 out of 60 seats, as creating a "de facto one-party state". Tyler Mattiace, a researcher for Human Rights Watch, described the election as a "growing rejection of the basic principles of democracy and human rights, and support for authoritarian populism among people who feel that, concepts like democracy and human rights and due process have failed them".

=== Allegations of irregularities ===
Shortly after polling stations closed at 5 p.m. CST, Bukele accused the TSE and Indra Solutions of preventing expatriates from casting their vote by not allowing them to cast their vote after the stated time. He argued that people waiting in line before the polling stations closed still had to be allowed to vote and called upon Attorney General Rodolfo Delgado to launch an investigation. Delgado responded by stating that the office of the attorney general "will prosecute those who committed a crime". The TSE announced that it would re-open voting at three voting centers in the United States that had not allowed Salvadorans to vote after 5 p.m. CST, however, the TSE later retraced its announcement following a petition made by ARENA. Bukele responded on X to the TSE's retraction by stating "remember this, when the opposition asks you again for votes in the next elections".

The TSE released the first preliminary results late on 4 February 2024 but stalled until the morning of 5 February with its website crashing shortly before midnight local time. The TSE attributed the delay to "multiple actions that have hampered the development of the transmission activities of preliminary results" and shortages of paper to print out vote tallies. It advised electoral boards at polling stations to resort to contingency measures such as tallying votes by hand and taking photographs or scans of manual tallies before sending them to the TSE. Deputies from ARENA, the FMLN, Vamos, and Nuestro Tiempo criticized the TSE's counting delay. Nuestro Tiempo claimed that there were inconsistencies between preliminary vote totals published by the TSE in published statements and on its website. Óscar Picardo, the director of sciences at the Francisco Gavidia University, stated that "we've never seen a situation that affects electoral integrity like this ... it's obvious that Bukele has the most votes, as the polls say, but there are a lot of irregularities in the processing".

ARENA, the FMLN, Vamos, and Nuestro Tiempo all called for the TSE to launch a recount. On 5 February 2024, the TSE stated that it would conduct a recount of 29 percent of the presidential ballots at the José Adolfo Pineda National Gymnasium, and that the results would be finalized within 15 days. The recount began on 7 February and ended on 9 February. A similar recount occurred for the concurrent legislative election.

The Organization of American States (OAS) sent a election observation mission led by Isabel Saint Malo. Although the OAS voiced concern to the TSE during the recount process regarding the TSE leaving the recount process "in the hands of the representatives of the political parties", the OAS stated that "the Mission did not observe actions that would indicate that the will of the citizenry expressed at the polls was altered" ("la Misión no observó hechos que indicaran que se alteró la voluntad de la ciudadanía expresada en las urnas"). The Interchange and Solidarity Center stated that it had observed irregularities at 69 voting centers both in El Salvador and in the United States. Eduardo Escobar, a lawyer for the Citizen Action non-governmental organization, stated that there were "surely" irregularities and questioned how much of an impact they had on the final results.

=== Presidential transition ===
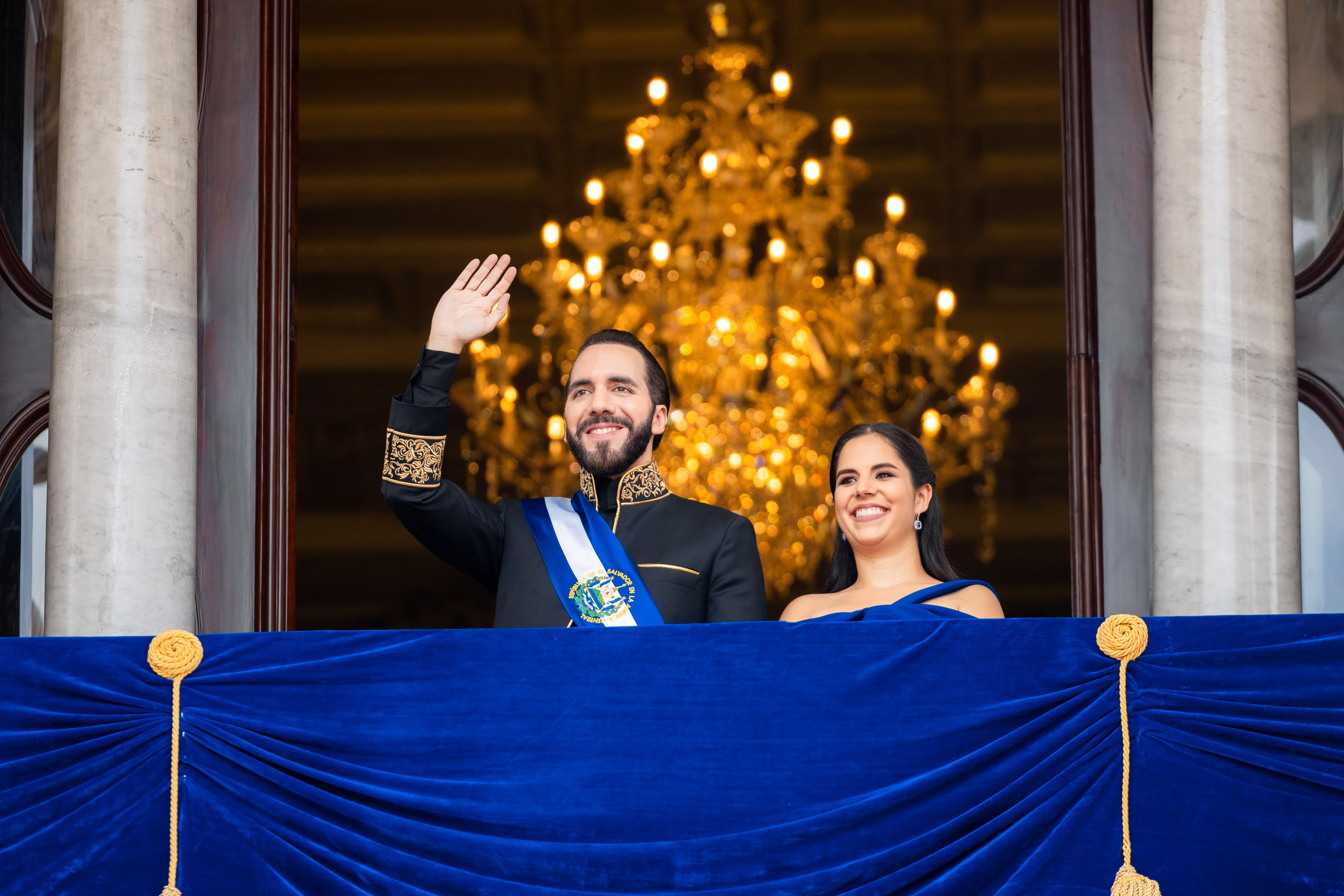
Bukele with his wife, Gabriela Rodríguez, at his second inauguration

The TSE ratified the results of the presidential election on 18 February 2024. It granted Bukele and Ulloa their presidential and vice presidential credentials, respectively, on 29 February. Bukele and Ulloa were inaugurated for a second term on 1 June at the Plaza Gerardo Barrios in San Salvador's historic downtown.

Alexis Henríquez, a writer for the Observatory of Political Reforms in Latin America, described the 2024 election as a "watershed" for the Salvadoran political party system due to reforms that enabled Bukele's re-election. Bukele is the first person since Brigadier General Maximiliano Hernández Martínez (in office 1931–1934 and 1935–1944) to be re-elected and serve multiple terms as president. Additionally, he was the first president since Antonio Saca (served 2004–2009) to seek re-election. (Note: Antonio Saca's re-election bid was for the 2014 presidential election, one election cycle after his initial election in 2004.)

Immediately after Bukele's re-election victory, The Economist indicated that Bukele may potentially seek to change the constitution and run for a third presidential term in the next presidential election, as he had previously stated that the constitution did not "currently" allow for a third presidential term. In a July 2024 interview with Time, Bukele stated that he would not seek a third term in 2029. (Note: This interview occurred before July 2025 when the Legislative Assembly voted to move the date of the next presidential election from 2029 to 2027.)

== See also ==
- Elections in El Salvador
- List of elections in 2024
  - 2024 national electoral calendar
