= Elections in El Salvador =

Elections in El Salvador are held for government offices at the national and municipal levels. Salvadoran citizens elect the president, vice president, and deputies of the Legislative Assembly at the national level; and mayors and municipal council members at the municipal level. All elected officials are selected in direct elections.

El Salvador has held elections since the 1820s, but elections have faced fraud, clientelism, patronage, and political violence throughout its history. The elections of the early 1900s experienced little political competition. The 20th century military dictatorship halted democratic reforms implemented by President Pío Romero Bosque in the late 1920s, but the dictatorship continued to utilize elections to legitimize its rule. Since the 1980s, El Salvador has held free and fair elections, but political analysts have raised concerns of democratic backsliding during Nayib Bukele's presidency. Constitutional reforms in 2025 eliminated supranational Central American Parliament (PARLACEN) elections, altered presidential term limits and term lengths, and replaced the two-round system for a first-past-the-post system for presidential elections.

== Voting ==
=== Voting systems ===
El Salvador holds elections at the national, municipal, and supranational levels. At the national level, Salvadorans elect the president, vice president, 60 deputies to the Legislative Assembly, and 60 alternates to the 60 deputies. At the municipal level, Salvadorans elect mayors, trustees, and aldermen, and at the supranational level, Salvadorans elect 20 deputies to the Central American Parliament (PARLACEN) and 20 alternates. The country employs different voting methods at the different electoral levels. These methods are established by both the 1983 constitution of El Salvador and the 1993 electoral code. Elections are not held for the governors of the 14 departments, who are instead appointed by the president.

==== Presidential elections ====
Until 2024, the president was elected through a two-round system. An individual was required to obtain an absolute majority (50% + 1) to win the election, but if no candidate reached an absolute majority, a second round would have been held between the two candidates who received the most votes in the first round. From 2027, the president will be elected through first-past-the-post. The president was elected for a five-year term until 2024; from 2027, presidential terms will be six years long. Consecutive re-election was constitutionally prohibited until a 2025 constitutional reform abolished term limits. The vice president is elected on the same ticket as the president. To run for president, one must be a Salvadoran citizen, have been born in El Salvador or have at least one Salvadoran parent, and be at least 30 years old. Presidential candidates also must be affiliated with a political party that is registered with the Supreme Electoral Court (TSE).

==== Legislative elections ====
The number of seats in the Legislative Assembly assigned to each department from the 2027 legislative election

Seats in the Legislative Assembly are assigned proportionally in 15 multi-member constituencies. Until 2021, 84 seats were allocated using the hare quota largest remainder method; since 2024, 60 seats have been allocated using the D'Hondt method. Every deputy is elected alongside an alternate. Deputies serve three-year terms and can be re-elected indefinitely. Candidates for the Legislative Assembly must be a Salvadoran citizen, have been born in El Salvador or have at least one Salvadoran parent, and be at least 25 years old. Since 2000, at least 30 percent of deputies to the Legislative Assembly had to be women. The Legislative Assembly was a bicameral legislature until 1886, after which, it became a unicameral legislature.

==== Municipal elections ====
At the municipal level, voters elect a mayor and members of the municipal council. The municipal council consists of a number of trustees and alderman that vary depending on the municipality. As of 2024, 40 municipalities had 10 council members, 2 municipalities had 14 members, and 2 municipalities had 16 members; prior to 2024, there were 262 municipalities. Mayors and members of municipal councils must be at least 21 years old and live in the municipality they govern. Mayors and members of municipal councils are elected to three-year terms and can be re-elected indefinitely with no term limits.

==== PARLACEN elections ====
From 1991 to 2024, El Salvador elected 20 deputies to the Central American Parliament, a supranational Central American political organization. Each deputy was elected alongside an alternate. PARLACEN elections will be discontinued as, in 2025, the Legislative Assembly approved a constitutional reform to withdraw El Salvador from PARLACEN.

=== Eligibility ===
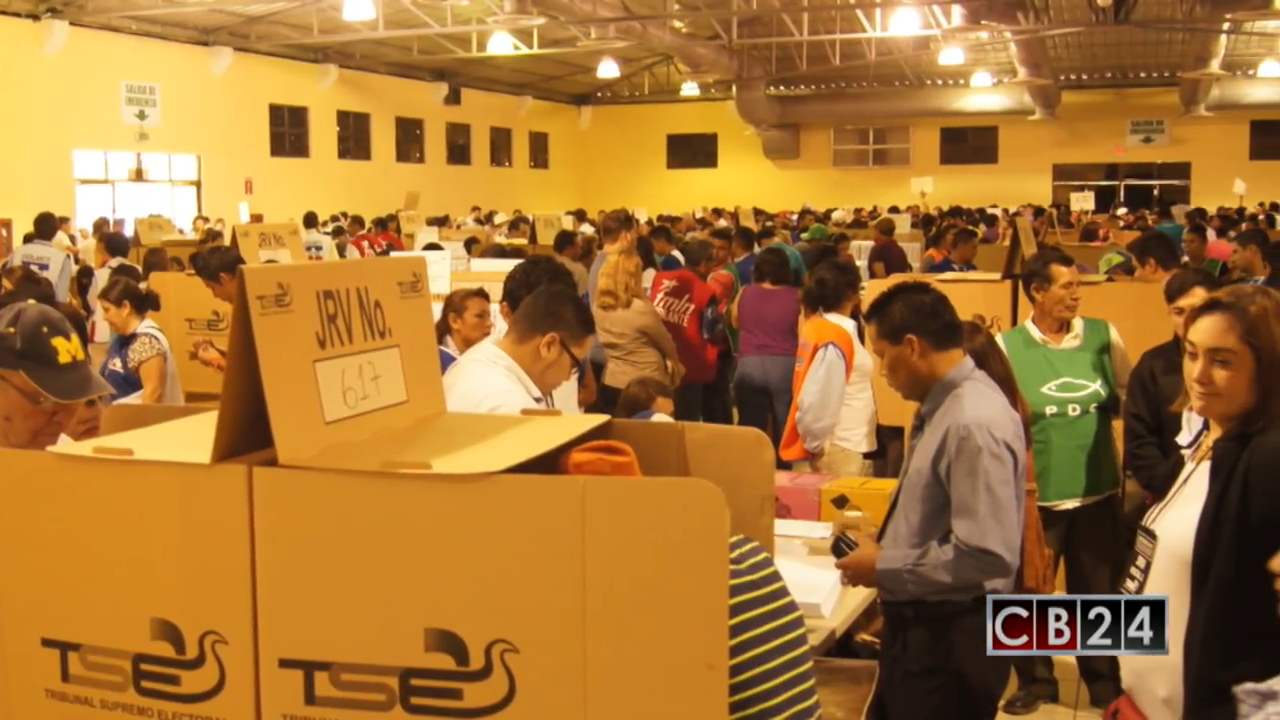
Salvadorans casting their votes during the 2019 presidential election

The 1841 constitution of El Salvador granted universal suffrage to all men over the age of 21 regardless of ethnicity, literacy, or wealth. Women were granted universal suffrage in 1939. Since 1950, the voting age in El Salvador has been 18, and the secret ballot has been in place since 1963. Voting is not compulsory. Salvadorans living outside of the country are allowed to vote in presidential and legislative elections but not in municipal elections. Their vote is assigned to an overseas constituency.

== History ==
The first elections in El Salvador were held during the 1820s, shortly after its independence from the Spanish Empire. The 1841 constitution of El Salvador mandated direct elections for the presidency and the legislature, meanwhile, municipal elections were indirect. From 1841 to 1864, all presidents, vice presidents, and legislators had to prove they owned a certain amount of pesos, and indirect elections were abolished in 1872. Indigenous Salvadorans were allowed to participate in elections but often faced racism and discrimination that made it difficult for them to win elections outside of indigenous-majority communities.

According to German political scientist Michael Krennerich, elections between 1903 and 1931 held "little political significance" as political competition was restricted to the country's small oligarchy. During the late 1920s, President Pío Romero Bosque attempted to implement democratic reforms, and the subsequent 1931 presidential election was described at the time as being free and fair by election observers. Later that year, however, the military overthrew President Arturo Araujo and established a military dictatorship. Until 1979, the military used elections to legitimize its rule. Several military-run political parties ruled the country between 1931 and 1979, including the National Pro Patria Party (PNPP), the Revolutionary Party of Democratic Unification (PRUD), and the National Conciliation Party (PCN).

During the Salvadoran Civil War (1979–1992), elections were dominated by the Christian Democratic Party (PDC), Nationalist Republican Alliance (ARENA), and the remnants of the PCN. Left-wing parties began participating in elections in 1989. When the civil war ended, the rebel Farabundo Martí National Liberation Front (FMLN) was legalized as a political party, and for the next three decades, it and ARENA were the two largest political parties in El Salvador. The ARENA–FMLN two-party system ended when Nayib Bukele was elected as president in 2019 and his party, Nuevas Ideas (NI), won a supermajority in the Legislative Assembly in 2021.

On 31 July 2025, the Legislative Assembly passed constitutional reforms that altered how some Salvadoran elections would be conducted. The legislature voted to abolish presidential term limits, increased presidential term lengths from 5 to 6 years, and moved the date of the next presidential election from 2029 to 2027. The Legislative Assembly also voted to withdraw from PARLACEN, effectively canceling the 2029 PARLACEN election. In May 2026, the Legislative Assembly ratified a constitutional reform that created an overseas constituency give legislative representation to Salvadoran expatriates.

=== Election integrity ===
During the 19th century, many Salvadoran political leaders ignored various political rules and regulations in order to hold on to power. Historian Erik Ching described this era of Salvadoran politics as being characterized by clientelism and patronage, especially at the municipal level. Patrons often employed clients to influence elections, engage in political violence, and develop political networks to hold on to power. Voters were sometimes intimidated to vote in specific ways by gangs loyal to political leaders in order to monopolize voting. On several occasions, municipal councils were entirely composed of family members.

Ching remarked that the "golden rule" of Salvadoran politics was "to win an election[,] a network had to monopolize the voting". He noted that several 19th-century national elections produced results where candidates won unanimously in certain districts. In some instances, presidential candidates ran unopposed. El Salvador also experienced several coups during the 19th century that led to frequent changes of power. In the first three elections of the 20th century, the incumbent president chose their successors, all of whom won by large margins. Regarding the 1911 presidential election, historian Alastair White wrote that "opponents were allowed to participate but not allowed to win".

Shortly after the military dictatorship rose to power in 1931, it ensured that all candidates in the 1932 legislative election were loyal to Brigadier General Maximiliano Hernández Martínez's government. Martínez ran unopposed in three consecutive presidential elections, and in the latter two, he amended the constitution to allow himself to seek re-election. Krennerich described El Salvador during the military dictatorship as having been a "façade democracy". He further labeled the presidential and legislative elections held during the 1970s as being marked by "massive electoral fraud", noting that no official results were published in some instances.

According to Krennerich, El Salvador has held free elections since 1982, but some political analysts have raised concerns of democratic backsliding during Bukele's presidency, citing Bukele's successful 2024 re-election, a degradation of checks and balances, and electoral reforms that benefited the ruling Nuevas Ideas.

== Election schedule ==
The following table shows previous and upcoming elections in El Salvador.

Year	2019	2020	2021	2022	2023	2024	2025	2026	2027	2028	2029	2030	2031	2032	2033
President and Vice President	Yes	No				Yes	No		Yes	No					Yes
Legislative Assembly	No		All 84 seats	No		All 60 seats	No		All 60 seats	No		All 60 seats	No		All 60 seats
Municipalities	No		All 262 municipalities	No		All 44 municipalities	No		All 44 municipalities	No		All 44 municipalities	No		All 44 municipalities
PARLACEN	No		All 20 seats	No		All 20 seats	No								

== See also ==
- Politics of El Salvador
