= Marina Murillo =

Salvadoran architect and politician

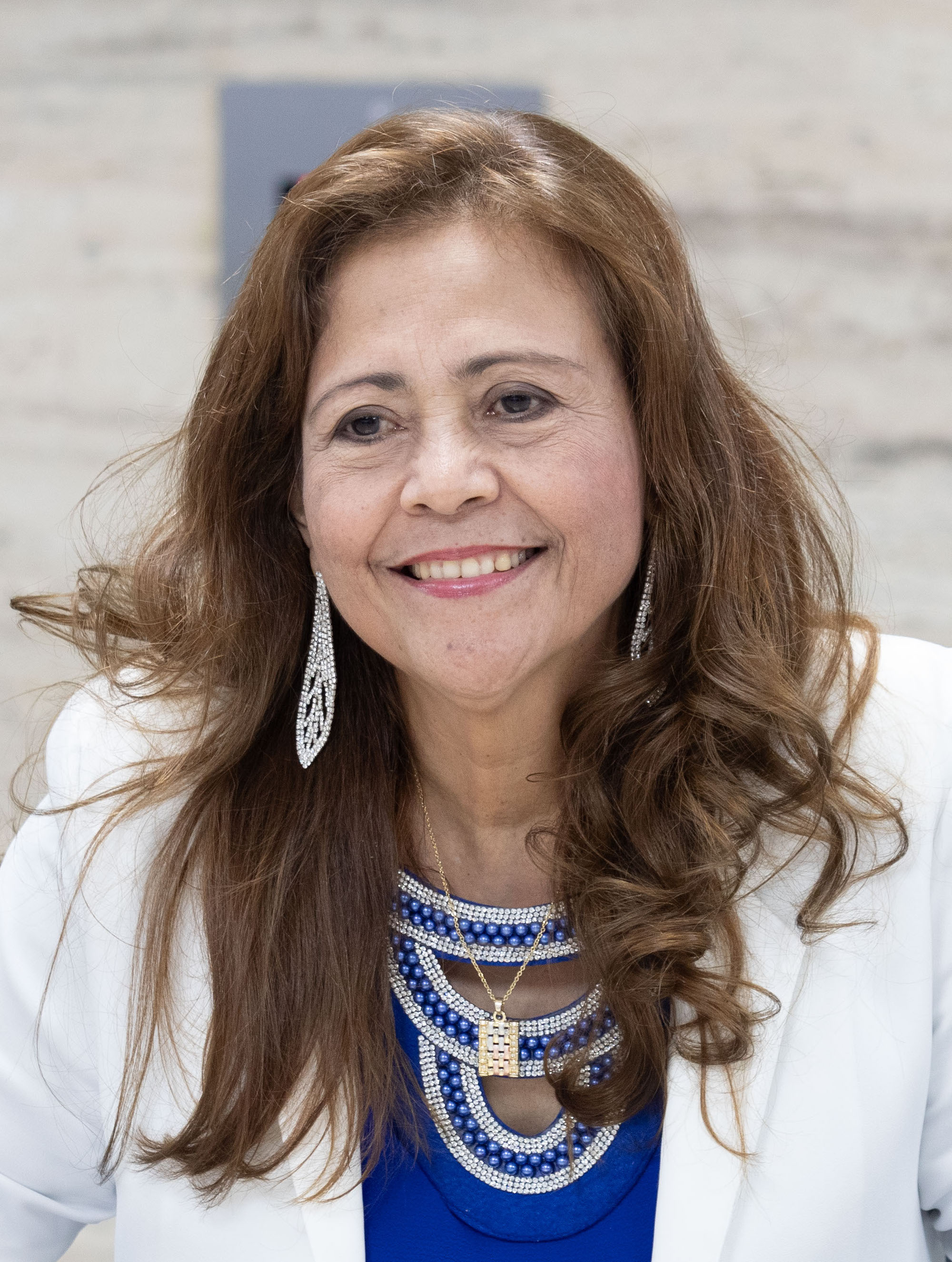
Marina Murillo in 2024

Ana Marina Murillo Aguilar is a Salvadoran architect and politician. She was the only woman candidate at the 2024 Salvadoran presidential election for Salvadoran Patriotic Fraternity (FPS), and the first since Rina Victoria Escalante in 1994.

== Early life ==
Murillo is an architect by profession since 1985 and began working at the National Commission for the Restoration of Areas, an institution set up in 1983 to help rebuild parts of the country damaged by violence. She has also worked at the Salvadoran Institute for Municipal Development and the Association of Municipalities of the Republic of El Salvador. She spent her childhood in the countryside.

== Political career ==
She first became involved with Salvadoran Patriotic Fraternity in 1999 or 2000 when she met its leader Óscar Lemus to work on a few projects.

On 27 August 2023, Murillo officially announced her ticket for the 2023 presidential election under Salvadoran Patriotic Fraternity, with Fausto Carranzo as her running mate. Murillo was the first woman to stand as a presidential candidate in El Salvador since Rina Victoria Escalante in 1994. In her speech, she announced that education and the economy would be the priorities of her campaign, and her support for the ongoing state of emergency. The Supreme Electoral Court registered her candidacy on 9 November 2023 and was the only female candidate.

In an interview with La Prensa Gráfica on 31 January 2024, Murillo sets out proposals for long-term development in areas such as education, the economy and the fight against corruption, and offers a critique of the current political system, including President Nayib Bukele's re-election, whilst maintaining certain security policies and opposing abortion; she also considers it necessary to hold a public consultation on same-sex marriage and the gender identity law, both of which she respects.

Her candidacy received 19,293 votes, less than 1 percent of the total.
