= President of El Salvador =

Head of state and government

President of the Republic of El Salvador
- Presidente de la República de El Salvador
- Presidential seal

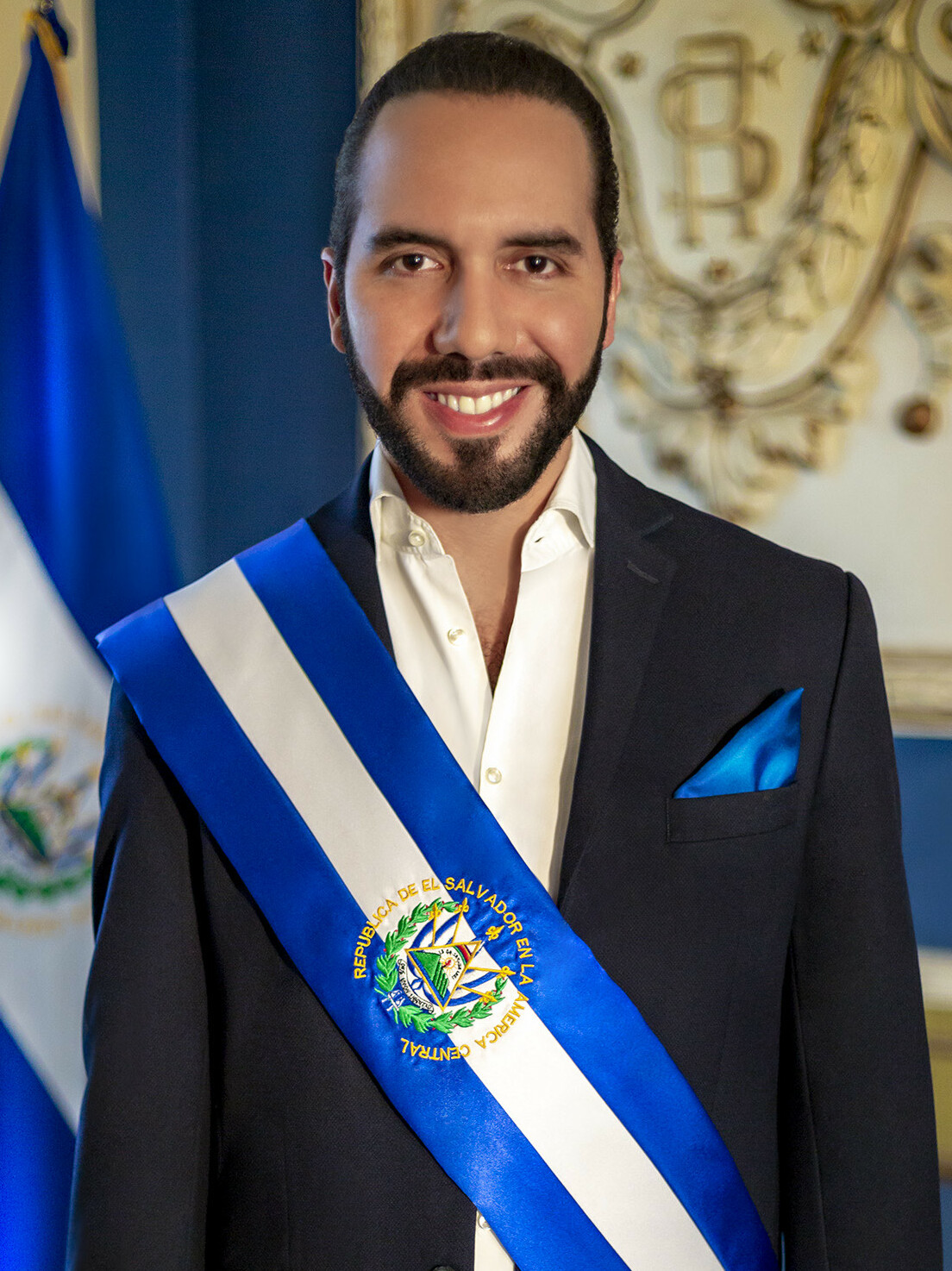
- Incumbent; Nayib Bukele since 1 June 2019
- Executive branch of the Government of El Salvador
- Style: The Most Excellent (Excelentísimo/a Señor/a) (diplomatic); His/Her Excellency (Su Excelencia) (diplomatic)
- Type: Head of state Head of government Commander-in-chief
- Residence: Casa Presidencial
- Appointer: Elected by the citizenry
- Term length: Five years, (Note: After the 2027 presidential election, presidential terms will be increased to six years.) renewable
- Constituting instrument: Constitution of El Salvador (1983)
- Formation: 15 September 1821; 205 years ago (as political chief); 22 April 1824; 202 years ago (as head of state); 30 January 1841; 185 years ago (as president)
- First holder: Pedro Barriere (as political chief); Juan Rodríguez (as head of state); Juan Lindo (as president)
- Succession: Line of succession
- Deputy: Vice President of El Salvador
- Salary: US$5,181 monthly (2017)
- Website: www.presidencia.gob.sv

The president of the Republic of El Salvador (Spanish: Presidente de la República de El Salvador) is the head of state and head of government of El Salvador. The president is also the commander-in-chief of the Armed Forces of El Salvador. Nayib Bukele has served as president of El Salvador since 1 June 2019.

The office of president of El Salvador was created in 1821 shortly after independence from the Spanish Empire. The position was known as "political chief of San Salvador" until 1824 when El Salvador's first constitution was adopted and the position was renamed as "head of state of El Salvador". After El Salvador declared its independence from the Federal Republic of Central America in 1841, the position was renamed to "president of El Salvador". Throughout Salvadoran history, presidential term lengths have varied from 2 to 6 years. Indefinite re-election and immediate re-election have largely been prohibited with a few exceptions; since 2025, both have been allowed.

The president holds executive power and appoints a cabinet of ministers. The president also has a deputy, the vice president. Since 1984, the president has been inaugurated on 1 June.

== History ==
=== Origins ===
In 1824, the state of El Salvador drafted its first constitution which created the office of Head of State, the precursor of the presidency. When El Salvador declared independence from the Federal Republic of Central America in 1841, its new constitution created the office of President of El Salvador.

In 1841, El Salvador was constituted as an independent and sovereign nation after the rupture of the Federal Republic of Central America in 1838. At that time, the legislative body created a constitution to legitimize the nation of El Salvador and also named Juan Lindo provisional president of the Republic of El Salvador on 2 February 1841. It was not until 26 September 1842 Juan José Guzmán was elected by the people as President of El Salvador. From that moment, the republic suffered a constant series of provisional governments that brought many leaders to power. Between 1841 and 1861, there were 42 presidential changes of power.

In 1858, Captain General Gerardo Barrios became president in which his government gave entrance to the "French Bread". He resigned from power in 1863 and Francisco Dueñas became president.

Until 1864, presidential term lengths were 2 years. The adoption of the 1864 constitution increased presidential term lengths to 4 years. From 1861 to 1899, there were 16 presidential changes of power. The average president's time in office from 1841 to 1899 was less than 1 year. In 1913, before the death of Manuel Enrique Araujo, a family dynasty would begin. The Meléndez–Quiñónez dynasty ended in 1927 when Pío Romero Bosque became president.

=== Military dictatorship ===
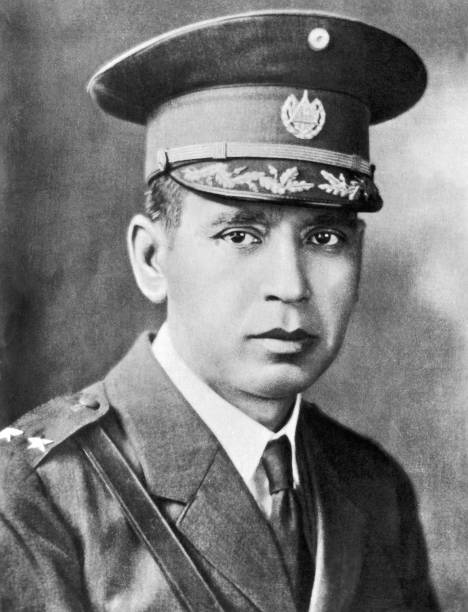
General Maximiliano Hernández Martínez, the longest serving president of El Salvador as well as the first president of the 20th century military dictatorship

In 1931, a coup d'état led by Vice President General Maximiliano Hernández Martínez overthrew Arturo Araujo. This dictatorial government would establish the foundations of a rigid and totally militarized nation. It was not until 1939 when General Martínez called for a Constituent Assembly to draft a new constitution which established that the presidential term would be increased from 4 to 6 years and would begin and end on 1 January. During his presidency, Martínez initiated La Matanza which killed 25,000 indigenous peoples. Martínez would be overthrown 12 years later in 1944 and General Andrés Ignacio Menéndez became provisional president.

From that moment, the presidency once again showed dictatorial instability and military governments began to be established to the point of creating a republic with military authoritarianism which would end in 1982. In 1950, Lieutenant Colonel Óscar Osorio constitutionally became the president of the Republic and a new constitution was drafted where the presidential term would be 6 years and begin and end on 14 September. Osorio was known as the president of the social programs since he implemented and founded programs such as the Urban Housing Institute (IVU), the Autonomous Port Executive Commission (CEPA) among others that benefited the nation.

In 1960, a coup d'état overthrew President José María Lemus which led to the formation of a Junta of Government which would later be overthrown by the Civic-Military Directory in 1961. This was the case until the constitutional order was reestablished and another constitution was created in 1962 which would bring with it significant presidential reforms. From that moment, the presidential term would last 5 years and begin and end on 1 July.

On 15 October 1979, the last coup d'état in Salvadoran history took place where a group of young soldiers and officers overthrew General Carlos Humberto Romero. The coup marked the beginning of the Salvadoran Civil War which would rage on from 1979 to 1992. The Revolutionary Government Junta was established and ruled over El Salvador while fighting against the communist guerrilla group Farabundo Martí National Liberation Front (FMLN). The Junta was abolished in 1982 and Álvaro Magaña became President of the Republic.

=== Current constitution ===
The 1983 Constituent Assembly decided to create the 1983 constitution of El Salvador which set presidential terms to 5 years and would begin and end on June 1. The civil war greatly affected the political stability of the country.

President José Napoleón Duarte would lead the government against the FMLN from 1984 to 1989. In 1989, the Nationalist Republican Alliance (ARENA) won the 1989 presidential election. Alfredo Cristiani became the first president of ARENA. ARENA won the presidential elections in 1989, 1994, 1999, and 2004. Its presidents were Alfredo Cristiani, Armando Calderón Sol, Francisco Flores, and Antonio Saca.

The Civil War ended in 1992 and the FMLN became a legal political party in accordance to the Chapultepec Peace Accords.

In 20 years of government, El Salvador was characterized by the privatization of national services such as coffee, telecommunications, the pension system, the National Bank, the Electric Power Service, among others. In 2001, the Economic Dollarization System was carried out in the country, a measure adopted by then President Francisco Flores which would have great long-term consequences for the Salvadoran economy and adopted the US dollar as legal currency.

Mauricio Funes won the 2009 presidential election ending 20 years of ARENA rule and marked the first FMLN presidency. Salvador Sánchez Cerén became the second FMLN president in 2014 after narrowly defeating Norman Quijano.

In 2019, Nayib Bukele, from the Grand Alliance for National Unity (GANA), won the 2019 presidential election ending 10 years of FMLN rule. He was the first president since Duarte to not be a member of either ARENA or FMLN. He was the second president from Palestinian descent, after Saca. He was inaugurated on 1 June 2019.

On 31 July 2025, the Legislative Assembly of El Salvador approved amendments to the constitution abolishing presidential term limits, eliminating runoff voting, and increasing the presidential term's duration to six years.

== Selection process ==
=== Eligibility ===
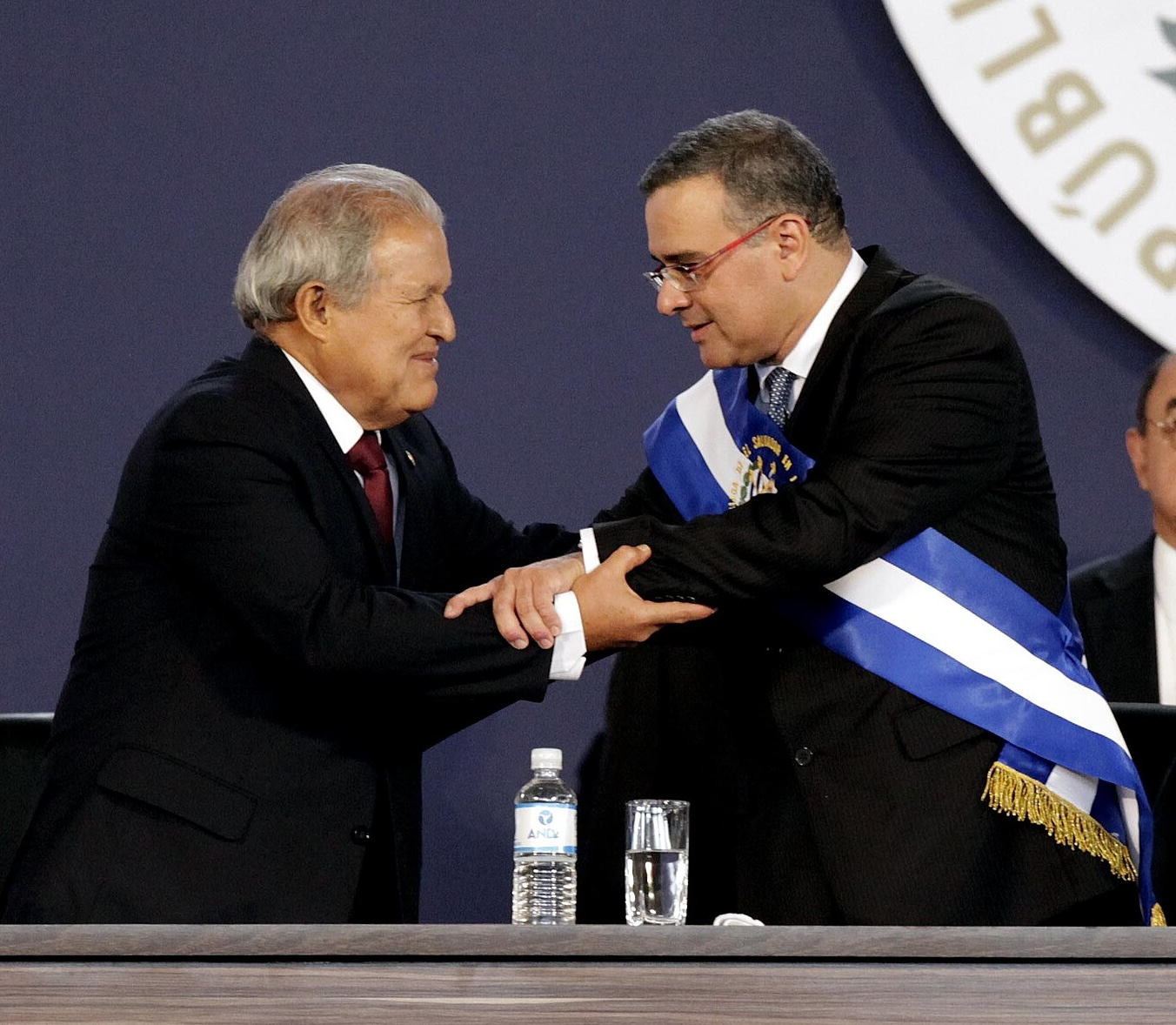
Outgoing president Mauricio Funes (wearing the presidential sash) embracing incoming president Salvador Sánchez Cerén in 2015

According to the 1983 constitution and the Law of Policial Parties, a candidate for the presidency must be at least 30 years old. A candidate must also be either a Salvadoran citizen by birth or have a parent who is a Salvadoran citizen. Candidates cannot have had their rights as a citizen suspended within the 6 years prior to an election, and all candidates must be affiliated with a political party registered with the Supreme Electoral Court.

Several individuals are explicitly prohibited by constitution from seeking the office of president. Neither the president of the Legislative Assembly nor the president of the Supreme Court of Justice may run for president "during the year prior to the day the presidential term begins". Cabinet ministers, vice ministers, and the directors of government institutions are also prohibited to seek the presidency under the same one year restriction, as are the vice president, anyone designated by the Legislative Assembly as a presidential designate, and the incumbent president's fourth-degree relatives. Active military personnel, former military personnel who had not yet been retired for three years, and the clergy are also prohibited from seeking the presidency.

=== Electoral process ===
During the 1800s and early 1900s, very few presidential elections were free and fair and political violence was common. During the 1950s, the president was elected through first-past-the-post voting, and during the 1960s and 1970s, the Legislative Assembly elected the president if no candidate received an absolute majority. From 1983 to 2025, a presidential candidate had to receive an absolute majority (50% + 1) to win a presidential election; if no candidate received an absolute majority, a second round between the two candidates with the most valid votes would have been held within one month of the first round. After constitutional reforms in 2025, first-past-the-post voting was restored.

== Constitutional framework ==
=== Powers and duties ===
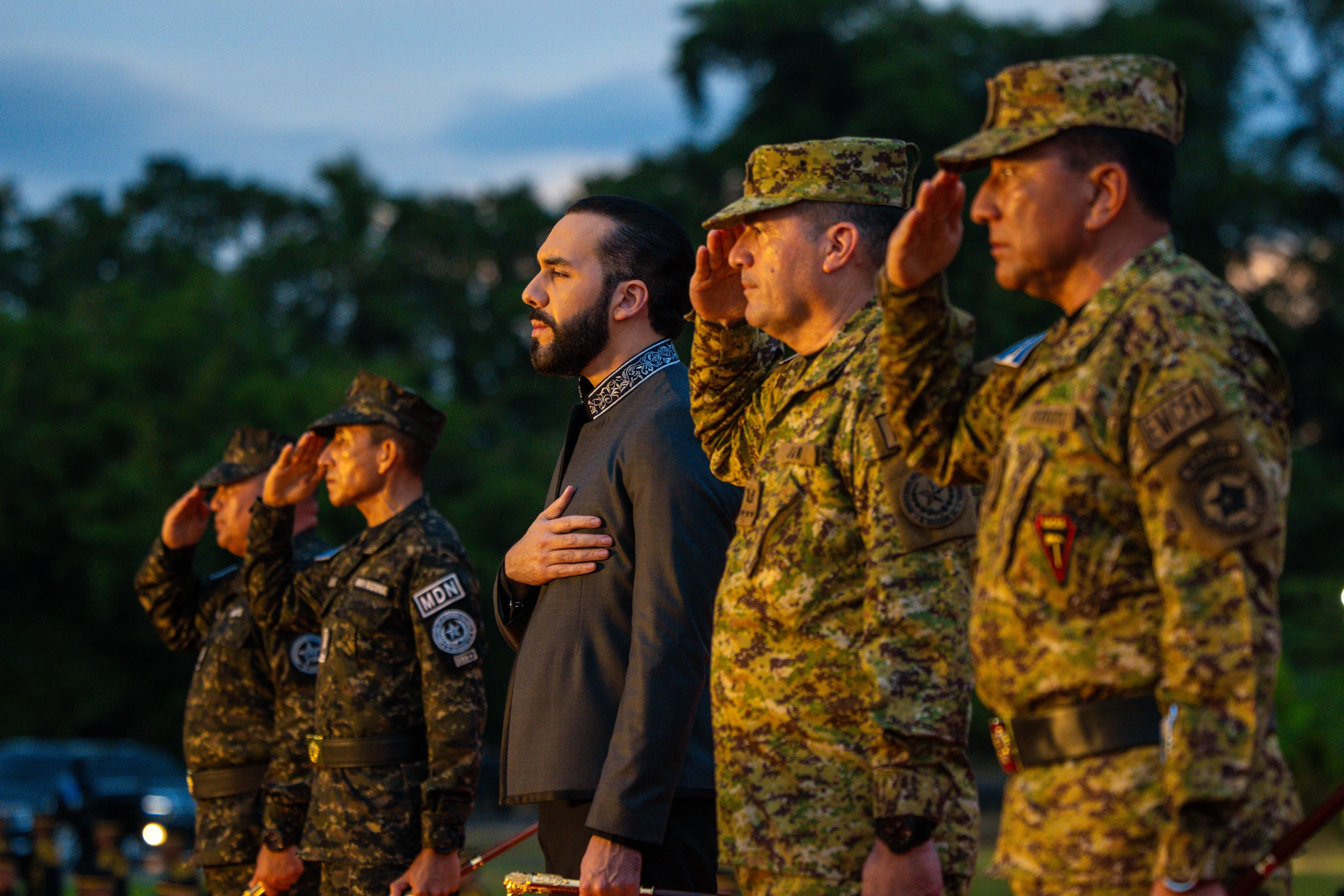
President Nayib Bukele with officers of the Armed Forces of El Salvador in 2024

According to the 1983 constitution, the president is a part of the executive branch of the Salvadoran government along with the vice president and the cabinet. The president appoints his cabinet ministers, vice ministers, and the governors of El Salvador's 14 departments (the equivalent of states or provinces). The president serves as the commander-in-chief of the Armed Forces of El Salvador and is in charge of El Salvador's foreign affairs.

The president is allowed to submit legislation to the Legislative Assembly for approval. The president is also allowed to veto any legislation passed by the Legislative Assembly, but the legislature can override a veto with a two-third majority vote. The president can challenge the constitutionality of law before the Supreme Court of Justice, but if the court rules the legislation is constitutional, the president is required to sign the legislation into law.

=== Checks and balances ===
The Legislative Assembly exerts some checks on the president's power as provided by the constitution. The president requires the approval of the Legislative Assembly in order to leave El Salvador for any reason. The president is also required to report anything to the Legislative Assembly upon request with the exception of military secrets, as well as to address the Legislative Assembly at the start of every calendar year regarding the prior year's government affairs. The Legislative Assembly is able to impeach and remove the president with a two-thirds majority vote. The president cannot ratify international treaties without the approval of the Legislative Assembly.

The length of presidential terms has varied throughout Salvadoran history. From 1841 to 1864, presidential terms lasted two years. From 1864 to 1871, presidential terms were extended to last four years. Two year terms were briefly restored from 1871 to 1872 before being reverted back to four year terms. Four-year long presidential terms remained extant (with a brief reduction to three years between 1883 and 1886) until the 1939 constitution extended presidential terms to six years. Term lengths were briefly reverted back to four years in 1946 before being extended back to six years in 1950. From 1962 to 2025, presidential terms have been five years long. In 2025, the Legislative Assembly of El Salvador approved a constitutional reform that extended presidential terms to six years; the change will go into effect following the 2027 presidential election.

=== Re-election ===
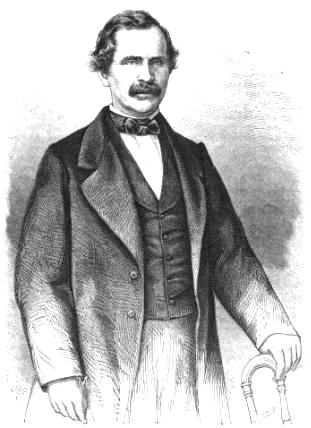
President Francisco Dueñas served eight presidential terms during the 1850s, 1860s, and 1870s.

For most of Salvadoran history, either immediate re-election or re-election entirely was prohibited. The 1841 constitution allowed presidents to seek re-election after having left office for at least one full term. The 1864 constitution permitted for an incumbent president to seek re-election immediately, but the 1871 constitution restored the requirement of presidents to wait one full term before being eligible for re-election. This restoration was short-lived as the 1872 prohibited re-election entirely. This prohibition on re-election persisted until 1983; (Note: Although re-election was prohibited entirely in El Salvador from 1872 until 1983, the 1939 constitution granted an explicit exemption to then-president Maximiliano Hernández Martínez to seek re-election. This exemption remained in effect until the 1946 constitution was adopted.) the 1983 constitution prohibits individuals from seeking re-election who served as president in the six months "during the period immediately before" or for the last six months "before the beginning of the presidential term". The constitution prohibits presidents from serving three or more terms. The constitution mandates the country's armed forces to intervene in the country's politics if a president seeks illegal re-election.

In May 2021, the Legislative Assembly removed and replaced the five justices of the Supreme Court of Justice's Constitutional Chamber. In September 2021, the new justices ruled that constitution in fact permits immediate re-election, arguing that the constitution reads that individual who served as president prior to the incumbent term was actually prohibited from seeking re-election rather than the incumbent president. This interpretation of the constitution was criticized as unconstitutional by lawyers, politicians, and activists. On 31 July 2025, the Legislative Assembly abolished presidential term limits.

The only six presidents in Salvadoran history have successfully been re-elected: Doroteo Vasconcelos, Francisco Dueñas, Santiago González, Rafael Zaldívar, Maximiliano Hernández Martínez, and Bukele. Other presidents have attempted but failed to be re-elected including Rafael Antonio Gutiérrez, Tomás Regalado, Salvador Castaneda Castro, and Antonio Saca.

== Succession ==
According to the constitution of El Salvador, the vice president is first in the line of presidential succession . After the vice president, anyone named by the Legislative Assembly as a "designate" ("designado") succeed the vice president in the line of succession. The Legislative Assembly can appoint up to two designates, although up to three have previously been appointed. Claudia Rodríguez de Guevara is the most recent presidential designate to assume presidential powers. She held presidential power from 2023 to 2024 while Bukele and Vice President Félix Ulloa sought re-election but Rodríguez did not assume the presidency itself.

== List of presidents ==
=== Living former presidents ===
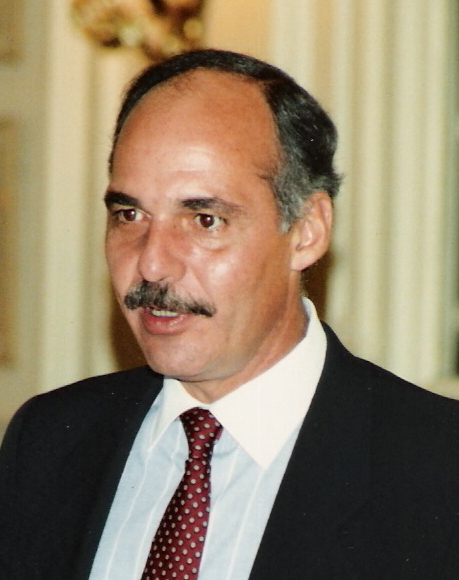
Alfredo Cristiani
(1989–1994)

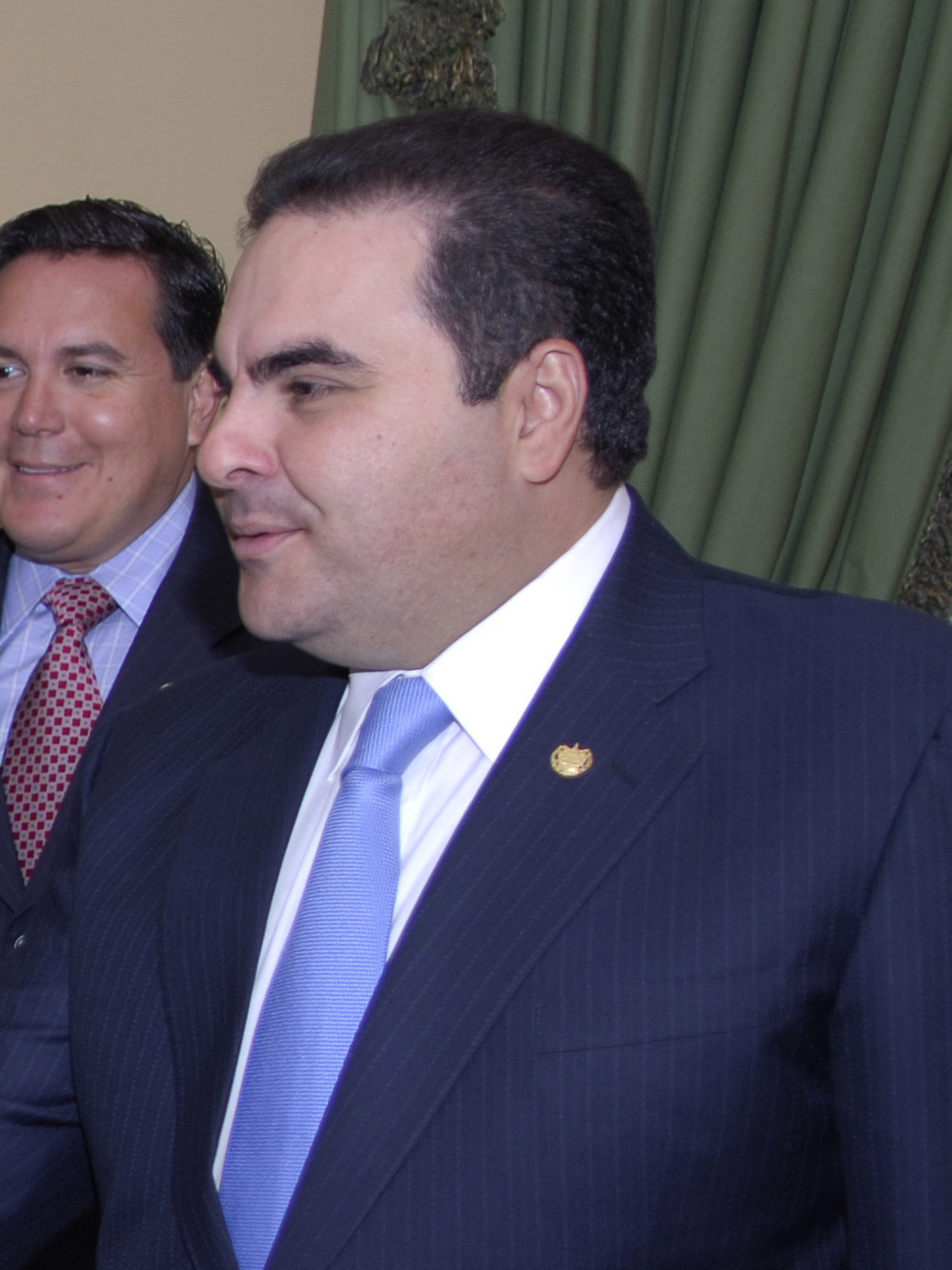
Antonio Saca
(2004–2009)

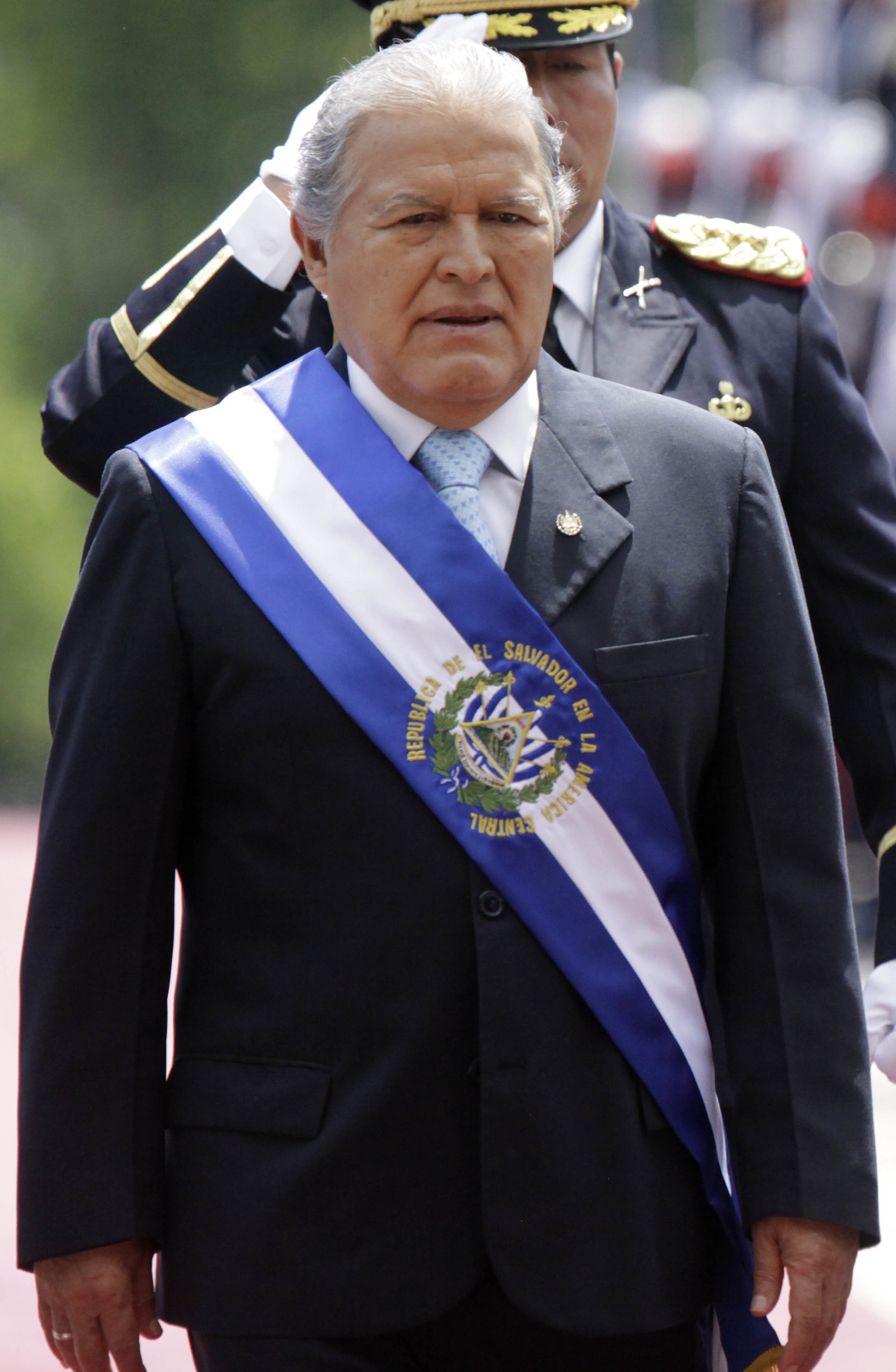
Salvador Sánchez Cerén
(2014–2019)

Claudia Rodríguez de Guevara
(2023–2024)
Acting

== Latest election ==
| Candidate | Running mate | Party | Votes | % |
|---|---|---|---|---|
| Nayib Bukele | Félix Ulloa | Nuevas Ideas | 2,701,725 | 84.65 |
| Manuel Flores | Werner Marroquín | Farabundo Martí National Liberation Front | 204,167 | 6.40 |
| Joel Sánchez | Hilcia Bonilla | Nationalist Republican Alliance | 177,881 | 5.57 |
| Luis Parada | Celia Medrano | Nuestro Tiempo | 65,076 | 2.04 |
| Javier Renderos | Rafael Montalvo | Solidary Force | 23,473 | 0.74 |
| Marina Murillo | Fausto Carranza | Salvadoran Patriotic Fraternity | 19,293 | 0.60 |
| Total | | | 3,191,615 | 100.00 |
| Valid votes | | | 3,191,615 | 97.65 |
| Invalid votes | | | 61,787 | 1.89 |
| Blank votes | | | 15,064 | 0.46 |
| Total votes | | | 3,268,466 | 100.00 |
| Registered voters/turnout | | | 6,214,399 | 52.60 |
Source: TSE at the Wayback Machine (archived 23 February 2024)

== See also ==
- Colonial Intendant of San Salvador
