= Luis Parada (lawyer) =

Salvadoran lawyer

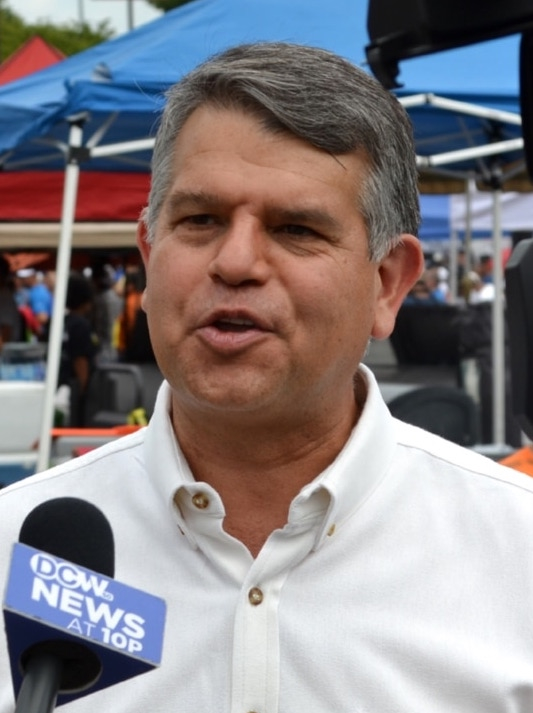
- Born: Luis Alberto Parada Fuentes; 2 April 1960 (age 66); San Salvador, El Salvador
- Education: EMCGGB; West Point Military Academy; Georgetown University Law Center
- Occupations: Lawyer; soldier
- Political party: Nuestro Tiempo (since 2023)
- Other political affiliations: Independent (2018–2023); Nationalist Republican Alliance (2017–2018)
- Military career
- Allegiance: El Salvador
- Branch: Salvadoran Army
- Service years: 1980–1994
- Rank: Captain
- Conflict: Salvadoran Civil War

Luis Alberto Parada Fuentes (born 2 April 1960) is a Salvadoran lawyer and retired soldier. Parada serves as an international defense attorney and is known for his work on the case of the 1989 murders of Jesuits in El Salvador. Parada was the presidential candidate for Nuestro Tiempo for the 2024 Salvadoran presidential election.

== Early life ==
Luis Alberto Parada Fuentes was born on 2 April 1960 in the San Jacinto neighborhood of San Salvador.

== Military service ==
In 1980, Parada graduated from the Captain General Gerardo Barrios Military School. He was assigned to the parachute battalion of the Salvadoran Army and was stationed in Morazán during the Salvadoran Civil War (1979–1992). Parada attended West Point Military Academy, graduating in 1984, after which, he served as a military attaché in Washington, D.C. Eventually, Parada became a member of the National Directorate of Intelligence (DNI). On 16 November 1989, Parada and 24 other DNI members visited the Central American University shortly after a massacre committed by the army killed eight people, including six Jesuits, which he condemned. Parada was discharged from the army on 1 November 1994 retiring with the rank of captain.

On 9 February 2020, Parada renounced his rank of captain the day that President Nayib Bukele sent 40 soldiers into the Legislative Assembly. Parada also criticized Minister of Defense René Merino Monroy for his participation in the incident, arguing that Merino should be relieved of his duty.

== Legal career ==
In 1997, Parada immigrated to the United States and studied at Georgetown University Law Center, becoming a practicing lawyer working for law firms specializing in international law, such as Foley Hoag, Curtis, Mallet-Prevost, Colt & Mosle, Dewey & LeBoeuf, and Arnold & Porter. He is a defense attorney specialized in defending countries. On four occasions, Parada defended El Salvador against international arbitration cases, specifically on legal matters related to the energy industry, of hundreds of millions of dollars each. He has cooperated with officials from Spain and the United States regarding the case of the 1989 Jesuit murders.

== Political career ==
=== 2019 presidential campaign ===
On 20 April 2017, during an interview with Radio 102 Nueve, Parada expressed interest in acquiring the presidential nomination for the Nationalist Republican Alliance (ARENA) for the 2019 presidential election, having joined the party that same month. In August 2017, Parada told the La Prensa Gráfica newspaper that he planned to finance his campaign through large donations, but added that he would only accept donations if the individual donating money did not expect him to provide presidential favors in exchange. He also stated that he chose to seek the presidency with ARENA because he believed that the party fit his political views. According to an opinion poll published by Marketing y Tendencias on 1 September 2017, around 2 percent of ARENA members stated that Parada should be the party's presidential candidate. On 2 October 2017, Parada stated he would no longer seek ARENA's presidential nomination, arguing that the party's candidate selection process would make his campaign impossible. Parada officially left ARENA in May 2018.

=== 2024 presidential campaign ===
On 31 May 2023, Parada announced his intention to run for president in the 2024 presidential election. His candidacy was proposed by the Sumar por El Salvador civil movement, and Celia Medrano, an activist and human rights lawyer, was his running mate. The following day during an interview with Telecorporación Salvadoreña's Frente a Frente, Andy Failer, the leader of the Nuestro Tiempo political party, confirmed that Parada and Medrano were both running under the banner of Nuestro Tiempo. On 15 July 2023, Nuestro Tiempo held its primary elections and Parada was confirmed as the party's presidential candidate. In the election, Parada finished in fourth place, winning 2.04 percent of the vote; Bukele won re-election.

=== Political views ===
Parada has criticized the Armed Forces of El Salvador's (FAES) conduct during the Salvadoran Civil War, stating that it went against the law, and condemned the 1989 Jesuit murders. During his 2019 presidential campaign, Parada stated that he felt "a lot of feeling, a lot of pity, [and] a lot of regret" ("mucho sentimiento, mucha lástima, mucho pesar") to see El Salvador in a situation of high crime, extortion, and corruption. In June 2023, Parada claimed that Bukele had proposed to make Parada a member of his cabinet in 2019.

Parada is in favor of the decriminalization of abortion. In an interview with Telecorporación Salvadoreña's Frente a Frente he said that "I believe that abortion is a woman's very personal decision. We are pro-life, but there are situations where there are medical emergencies and personal decisions that the State should not penalize a woman for" ("Yo creo que el aborto es una decisión muy personal de una mujer, somos próvida pero tampoco en todas las situaciones, se van a dar emergencias que requieran tomar decisiones médicas y decisiones personales, que el Estado no debe penalizar"). In an interview with Channel 9, Parada stated that, if he won the presidency, he would review the necessity of the Salvadoran gang crackdown and if it would be necessary to maintain. He has described the security provided by the gang crackdown as "the only card the Government has fabricated, and I say fabricated because it is that, a fabrication, an illusion" ("la única carta que ha fabricado el Gobierno, y te digo fabricado porque eso es, una fábrica, una ilusión").

== Personal life ==
Parada has a wife and children who immigrated with him to the United States.

== Electoral history ==
Year	Office	Type	Party	Main opponent	Party	Votes for Parada				Result	Swing
Year	Office	Type	Party	Main opponent	Party	Total	%	P.	±%	Result	Swing
2024	President of El Salvador	General	NT	Nayib Bukele	NI	65,076	2.04	4th	N/A	Lost	Hold
