= Rafael Montalvo (politician) =

Salvadoran author and politician (1942–2024)

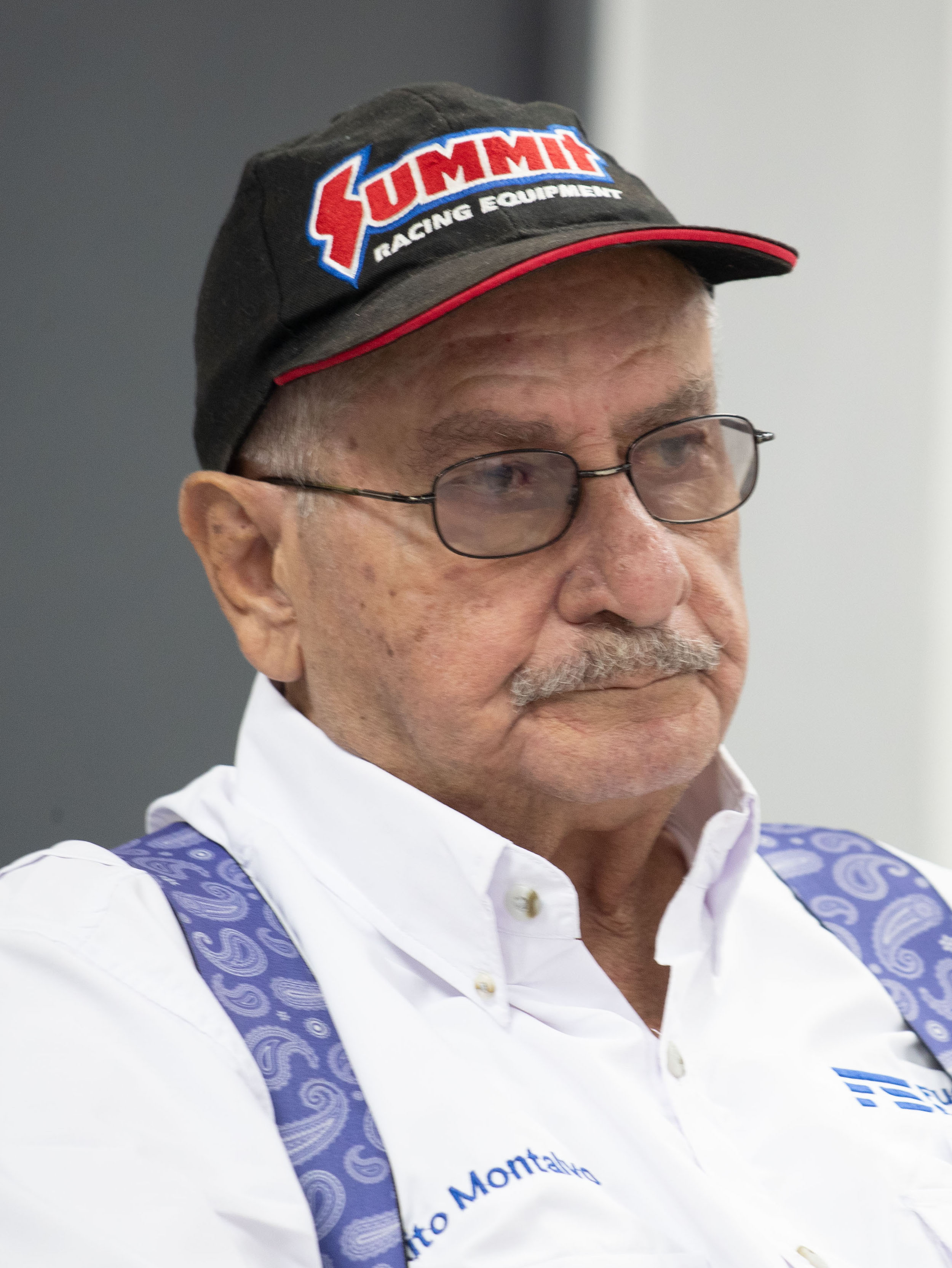
- Montalvo in 2023

Deputy of the Legislative Assembly of El Salvador from San Salvador
- In office 1 May 1988 – 1 May 1991

Personal details
- Born: 10 August 1942
- Died: 9 July 2024 (aged 81)
- Party: Nationalist Republican Alliance; National Action Party; National Conciliation Party; Solidary Force
- Occupation: Politician, businessman, author, agriculturist, agricultural engineer
- Nickname: Lito

Rafael Montalvo, known as Don Lito, (10 August 1942 – 8 July 2024) was a Salvadoran politician, businessman, author, agriculturist, and agricultural engineer. He served in the Legislative Assembly of El Salvador as a member of the Nationalist Republican Alliance (ARENA) party from 1988 until 1991. Many of his writings focused on daily life in El Salvador.

Montalvo was born on 10 August 1942. In 1964, Montalvo graduated from Zamorano, an agricultural school in Honduras, and became an agricultural engineer and businessman focusing on agricultural products. He served as the president of the Land Bank (el Banco de Tierra) from 1983 until 1988. He was then elected to the Legislative Assembly of El Salvador from 1988 to 1991 as a member of the conservative ARENA party during the Salvadoran Civil War.

In 2000, Montalvo ran for Mayor of San Salvador as the candidate from the National Action Party. He was also a candidate for Mayor of Antiguo Cuscatlán in 2006 on the National Conciliation Party (PCN) ticket, but lost the election. Montalvo ran for president of the ARENA party in 2017, but lost the party's internal election.

In the 2024 Salvadoran presidential election, he ran unsuccessfully for Vice President of El Salvador as the running mate of presidential candidate Javier Renderos on the Solidary Force party ticket.

Montalvo died from a cardiac arrest on 9 July 2024, at the age of 81.
