= San Salvador =

Capital of El Salvador

- Capital city and district
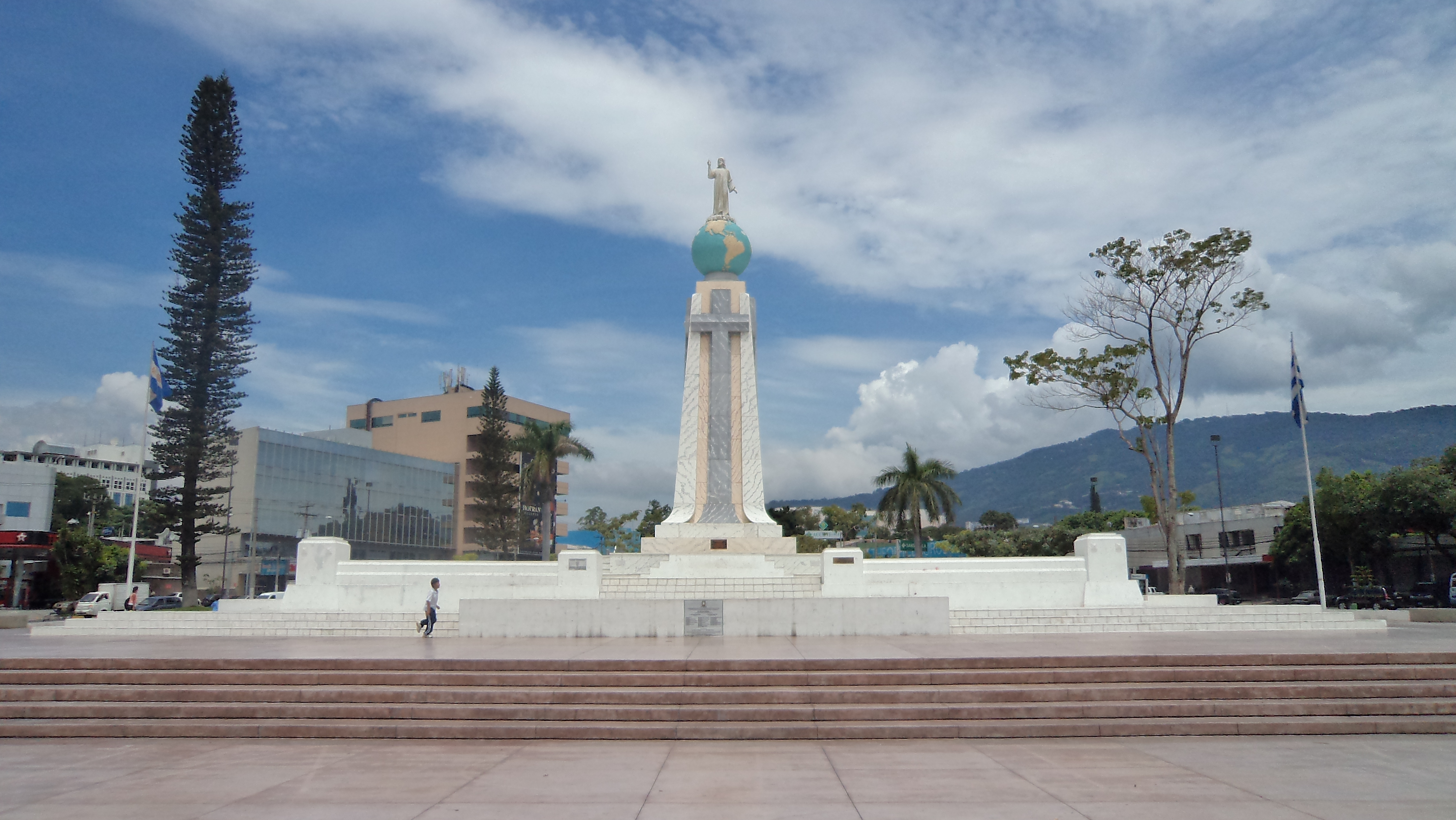
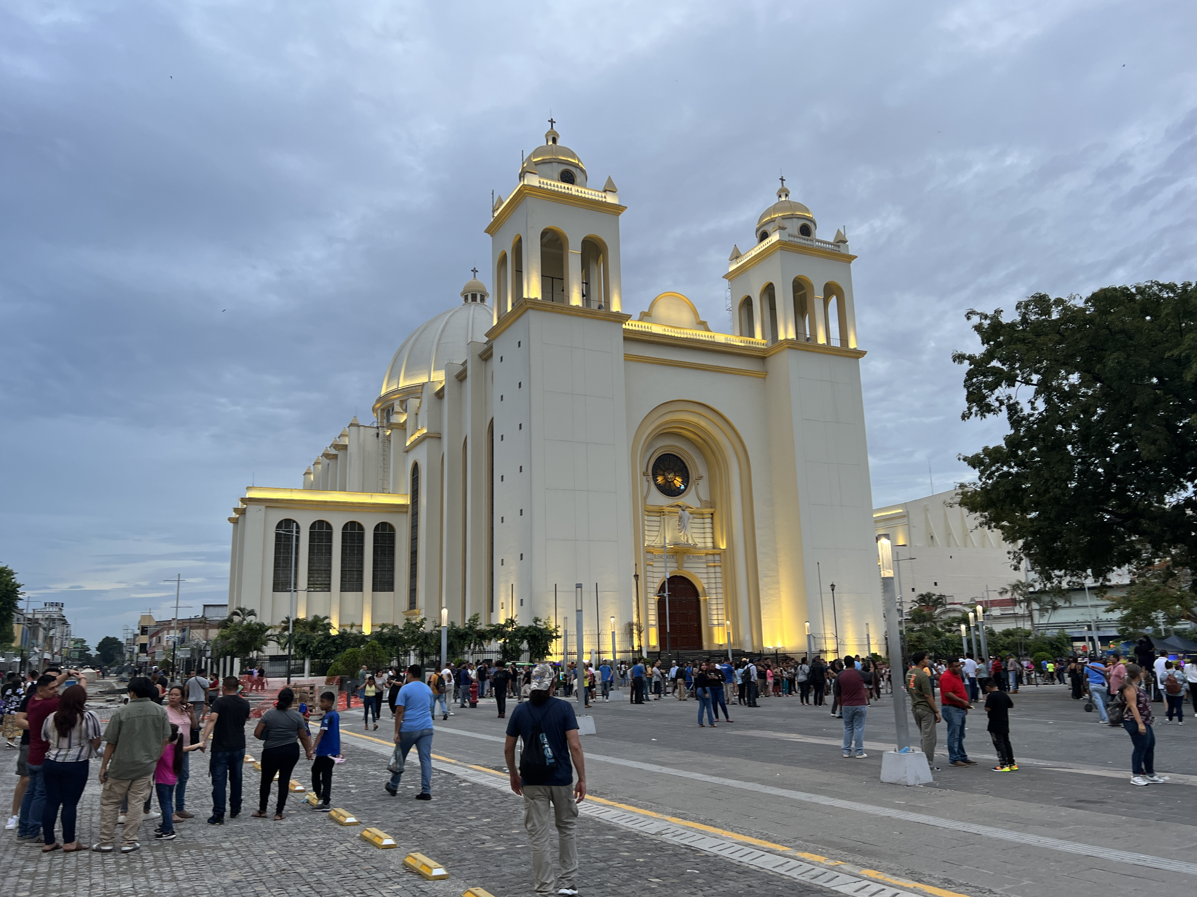
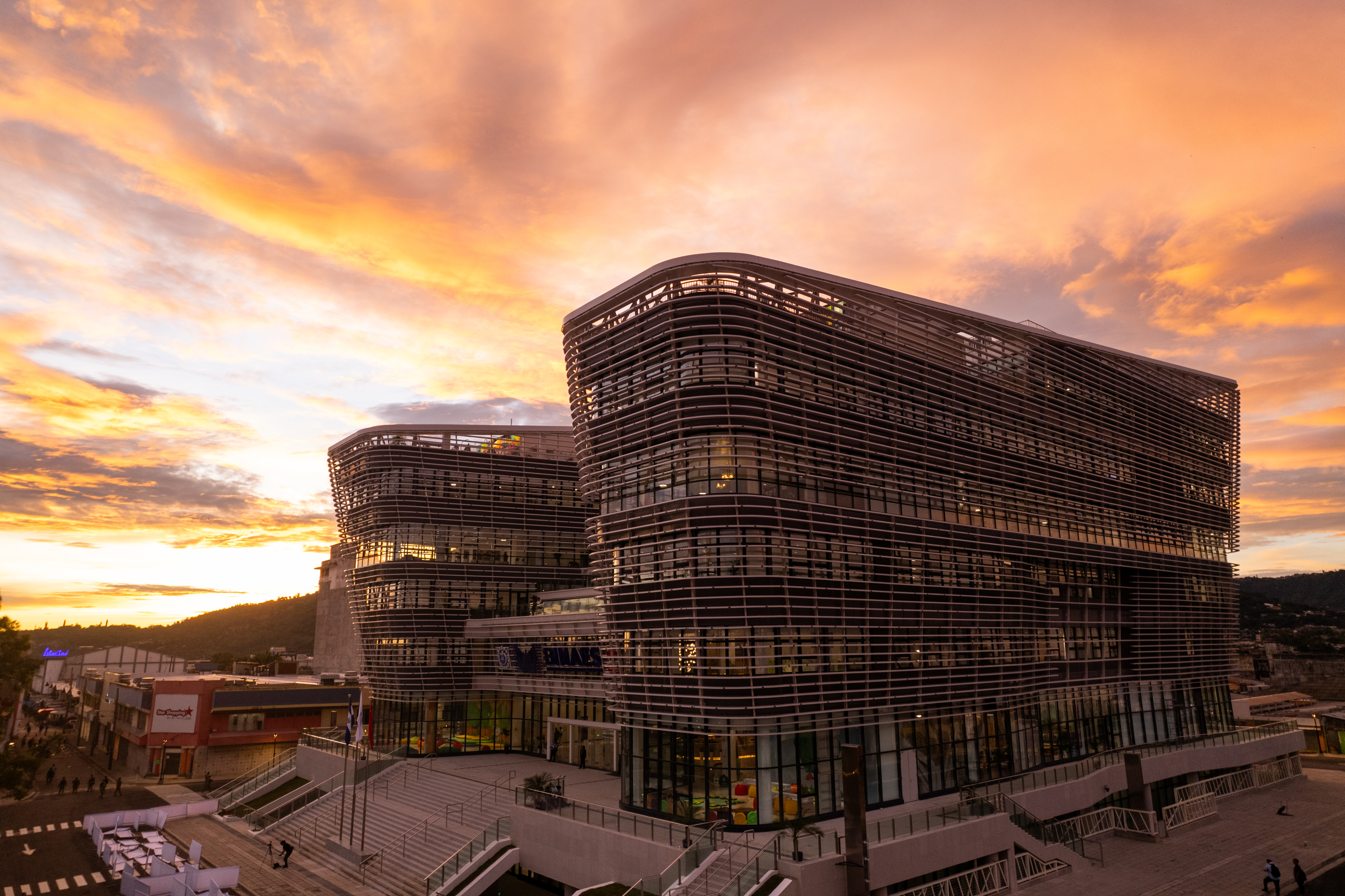
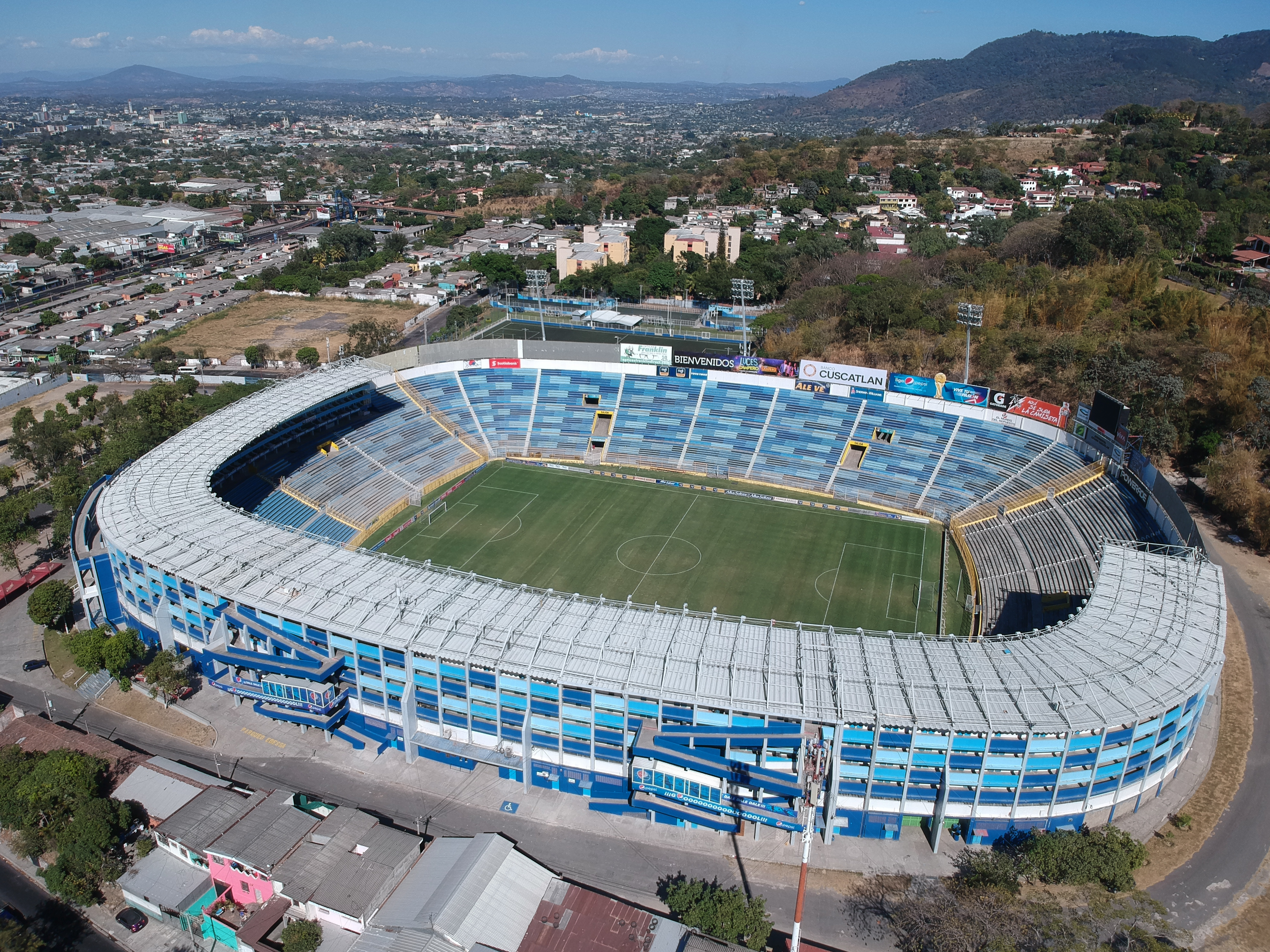
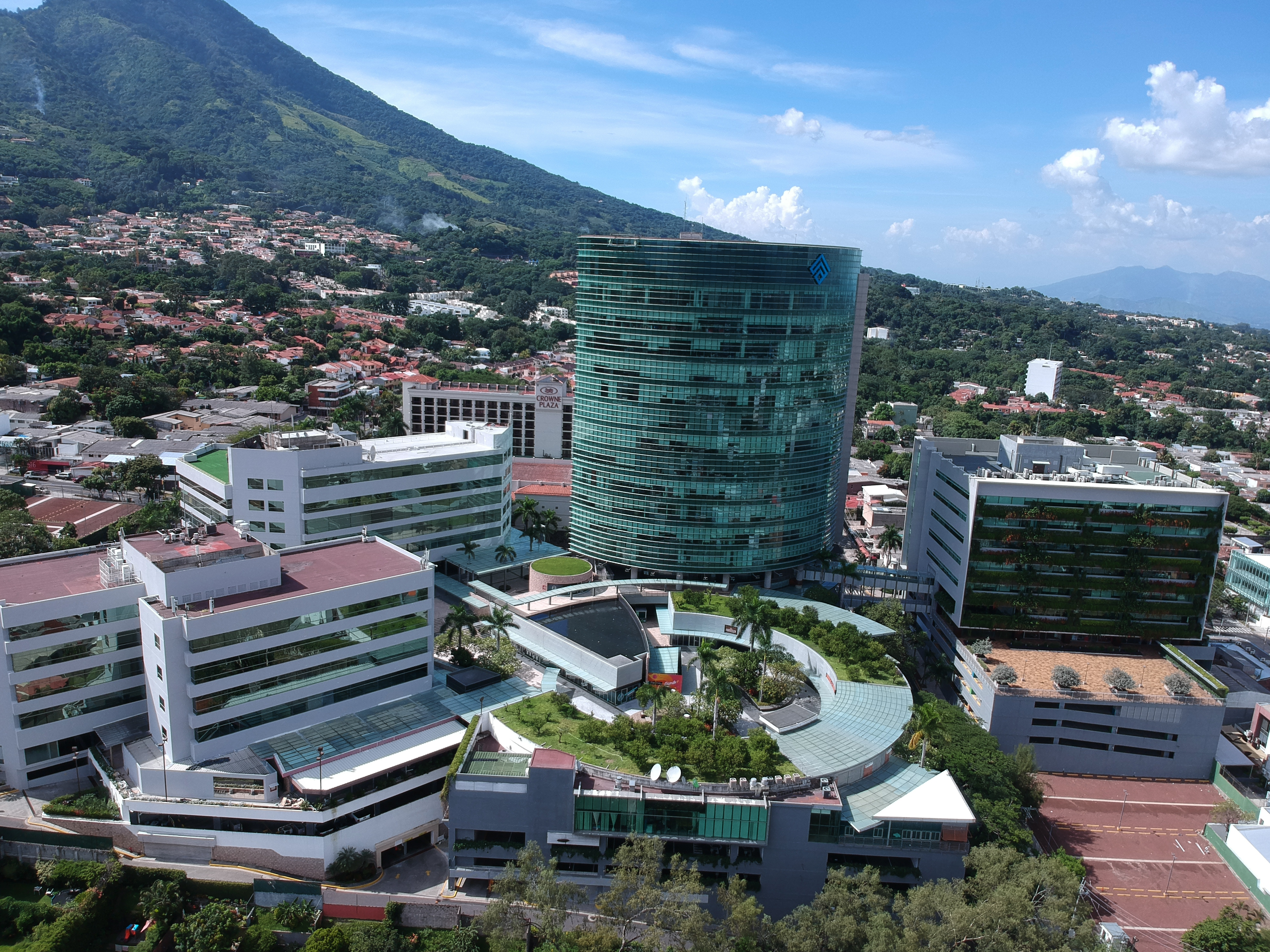
- Monumento al Divino Salvador del Mundo Metropolitan Cathedral of San Salvador National Library Cuscatlán Stadium World Trade Center San Salvador

- Flag Coat of arms
- Motto: Nuestra Capital – 2011 Ibero-American Capital of Culture
- Location within El Salvador Location within Central America Location within North America
- Coordinates: 13°41′56″N 89°11′29″W
- Country: El Salvador
- Department: San Salvador
- Municipality: San Salvador Centro
- Metro: San Salvador Metropolitan Area
- Founded: 1525
- Founded by: Pedro de Alvarado
- Named for: Divine Savior

Government
  - Type: Mayor–council government
  - Mayor: Mario Durán (Nuevas Ideas)

Area
  - Municipality: 72.25 km^{2} (27.90 sq mi)
  - Metro: 651.31 km^{2} (251.47 sq mi)
- Elevation: 658 m (2,159 ft)

Population (2024)
  - Municipality: 525,990
  - Rank: 1st, El Salvador
  - Density: 4,600/km^{2} (11,800/sq mi)
  - Urban: 1,538,525
  - Metro: 2,177,432
  - Metro density: 3,343.16/km^{2} (8,658.7/sq mi)
- Demonym(s): Sansalvadoran; Sansalvadoreño/a; Capitalino/a

GDP (PPP, constant 2015 values)
  - Year: 2023
  - Total (Metro): $14.7 billion
  - Per capita: $13,200
- Time zone: UTC−06:00 (CST)
- SV-SS: CP 1101
- Area code: + 503
- HDI (2018): 0.704 − high
- Website: sansalvador.gob.sv

San Salvador (Spanish pronunciation: [san salβaˈðoɾ]) is the capital and largest city of El Salvador and of its eponymous department. It is the country's largest agglomeration, serving as the country's political, cultural, educational and financial center. The municipality of San Salvador has 525,990 inhabitants (2024). The Metropolitan Area of San Salvador, which comprises the capital itself and 13 of its municipalities, has a population of 2,404,097. The urban area of San Salvador has a population of 1,600,000 inhabitants.

The city is home to the Consejo de Ministros de El Salvador (Council of Ministries of El Salvador), the Legislative Assembly of El Salvador, the Supreme Court of El Salvador, and other governmental institutions, as well as the official residence of the president of El Salvador. San Salvador is located in the Salvadoran highlands, surrounded by volcanoes and prone to earthquakes. The city is also home to the Roman Catholic Archdiocese of San Salvador, as well as many Protestant branches of Christianity, including Evangelicals, Baptists, and Pentecostals, and the restorationist Christian sect the Church of Jesus Christ of Latter-day Saints.

San Salvador has been the host city for regional and international sporting, political, and social events. It hosted the Central American and Caribbean Games in 1935, 2002, and in 2023 and the Central American Games in 1977 and 1994, as well as the Miss Universe pageant in 1975 and in 2023. San Salvador was also the host city of the 18th Ibero-American Summit in 2008, the most important sociopolitical event in the Spanish and Portuguese sphere. The Central American Integration System has its headquarters in San Salvador.

== Etymology ==
The conquistador Gonzalo de Alvarado founded a mission he named San Salvador in 1525. The name likely referenced the feast of the Transfiguration of Jesus (also called Divino Salvador in Spanish), celebrated on the 6th of August in the Western Church. On that day in 1456 Pope Callixtus III commemorated the Hungarian victory at the Siege of Belgrade against the Ottomans, specifically referencing the perceived divine intervention that led to the Christian victory. As a result, variations of the name 'holy' or 'divine' savior (san or divino salvador) became a popular inspiration for the names of churches and places, such as when Christopher Columbus named the island of Guanahani, Bahamas San Salvador in 1492. In the same vein, Pedro de Alvarado, when organizing his second expedition into the territory of Cuzcatlan, ordered his brother Gonzalo to name the town he founded San Salvador.

The name San Salvador would inspire the name for the country El Salvador which was a part of the Captaincy General of Guatemala as a province, and later an Intendancy in 1785. After the 19th Century first Independent movement, the Central American Independence Act, and the insurgency against Mexican rule, El Salvador became an independent state in 1824. The new government retained the name San Salvador for the capital city and the Salvadoran department.

== History ==
Historical affiliations

Kingdom of Spain 1525–1821
Mexican Empire 1822–1823
Central America 1823–1841
El Salvador 1841–1896
Central America 1896–1898
El Salvador 1898–present

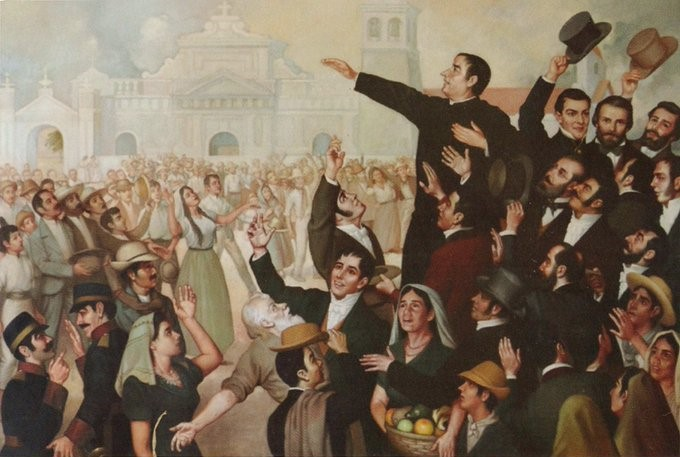
Primer Grito de Independencia ("First Cry for Independence"), painting by Luis Vergara Ahumada celebrating the proclamation of the country's independence on 5 November 1811. Pivotal Salvadorean revolutionaries appearing in the picture are José Matías Delgado, Manuel José Arce, and Juan Manuel Rodríguez. San Salvador, Casa Presidencial de El Salvador.

Before the Spanish conquest, the Pipil people established their capital, Cuzcatlan, near the current location of San Salvador. Not much is known about Cuzcatlan, as it was abandoned by its inhabitants in an effort to avoid Spanish rule. Under the orders of conquistador Pedro de Alvarado, his associates Gonzalo de Alvarado and Diego de Holguín occupied the empty settlement and began to develop it. Diego de Holguín became the first mayor of San Salvador after the town was founded on 1 April 1525. The town changed location twice, in 1528 and 1545. Originally established in what is now the archeological site of Ciudad Vieja, north of the present-day city, it was moved to the Valle de Las Hamacas, so named for the intense seismic activity that characterizes it. The new site was chosen because it had more space and more fertile land, thanks to the Acelhuate River.

The city became the seat of the Intendancy of San Salvador in 1785, however the population remained relatively small until the early 20th century. The War of the Salvadoran Revolution led by José Matías Delgado, Manuel José Arce, and Juan Manuel Rodríguez took place in San Salvador, and in fact started at the Our Lady of Mercy parish church. During the Independence struggle, the city was the political and administrative epicenter of the newly formed, independent Salvadorean state.

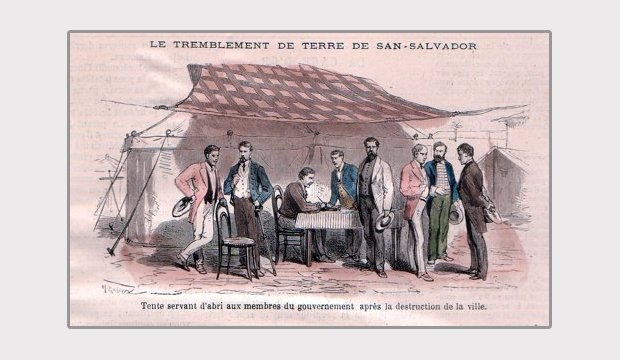
In 1873, the president and marshals Santiago González Portillo issued an executive decree, by which he ordered the immediate reconstruction of the city of San Salvador, devastated two days earlier by the Great Earthquake of San José.

In January 1885, during the presidency of Rafael Zaldívar, a group of businessmen and the president's family contributed funds for building the Sara Zaldivar Asylum for Indigents and the Elderly. In 1902, Hospital Rosales was built, named after its benefactor, José Rosales Herrador, a former Salvadoran president who gave his fortune to the hospital and to the orphanage. The hospital's construction was begun by president Carlos Ezeta and finished during the presidency of Tomás Regalado. In 1905, president Pedro José Escalón initiated construction of the National Palace funded by coffee exportation taxes. The Monumento a los Próceres de 1811 (Monument to the Heroes of 1811), located in the Plaza Libertad, and the Teatro Nacional de El Salvador were built in 1911 during Manuel Enrique Araujo's presidency.

In 1917, an earthquake during an eruption of the nearby San Salvador volcano damaged the city, but it escaped additional damage because the lava flowed down the back side of the volcano. On 2 December 1931, president Arturo Araujo was ousted by a military coup d'état and replaced by the military Civic Directory. The directory named vice-president Maximiliano Hernández Martínez as president and Araujo went into exile. The Hernández Martínez regime lasted from 4 December 1931 to 6 May 1944.

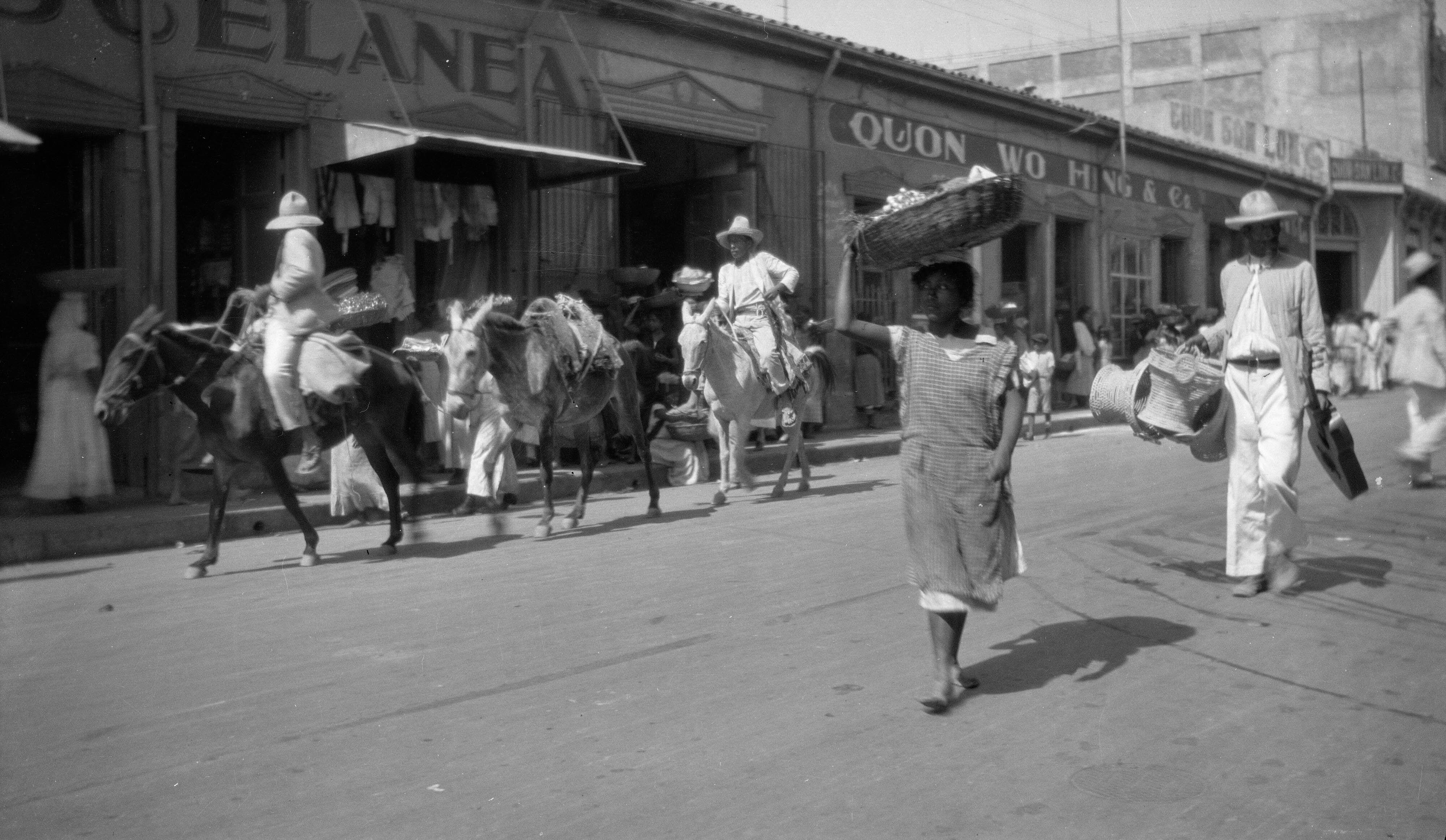
View of the street of the capital of El Salvador, San Salvador, in 1927

In 1964, the Christian Democratic Party candidate, José Napoleón Duarte, an engineer, was elected mayor; he served from 1964 to 1970. During his term he ordered construction of the Pancho Lara park in the Vista Hermosa neighborhood, renewed the electrical grid, and set up a system of schools for adult education. The 1960s to the 1980s were the golden age of San Salvador in all aspects of security, quality of life, and modernization.

With the commencement of the Salvadoran Civil War in the 1980s, many modernization projects were halted. Examples of suspended projects include a 40-story government building approximately 160 meters in height, and the Sheraton Hotel Tower, a 26-story building with a rotating restaurant on top.

In 1969, celebrations in the Estadio Cuscatlán were held in honor of the returning troops from the Football War with Honduras. The Boulevard de los Héroes (Boulevard of the Heroes) was named after the Salvadoran soldiers who fought there. The 1986 San Salvador earthquake destroyed many government buildings and other important structures, injuring and killing hundreds. Thousands of people were displaced by the disaster and many struggled to find shelter in the ruins.

In 1986, Mayor Morales Ehrlich closed streets in the downtown of the city to create a large pedestrian mall, which resulted in chronic traffic congestion.

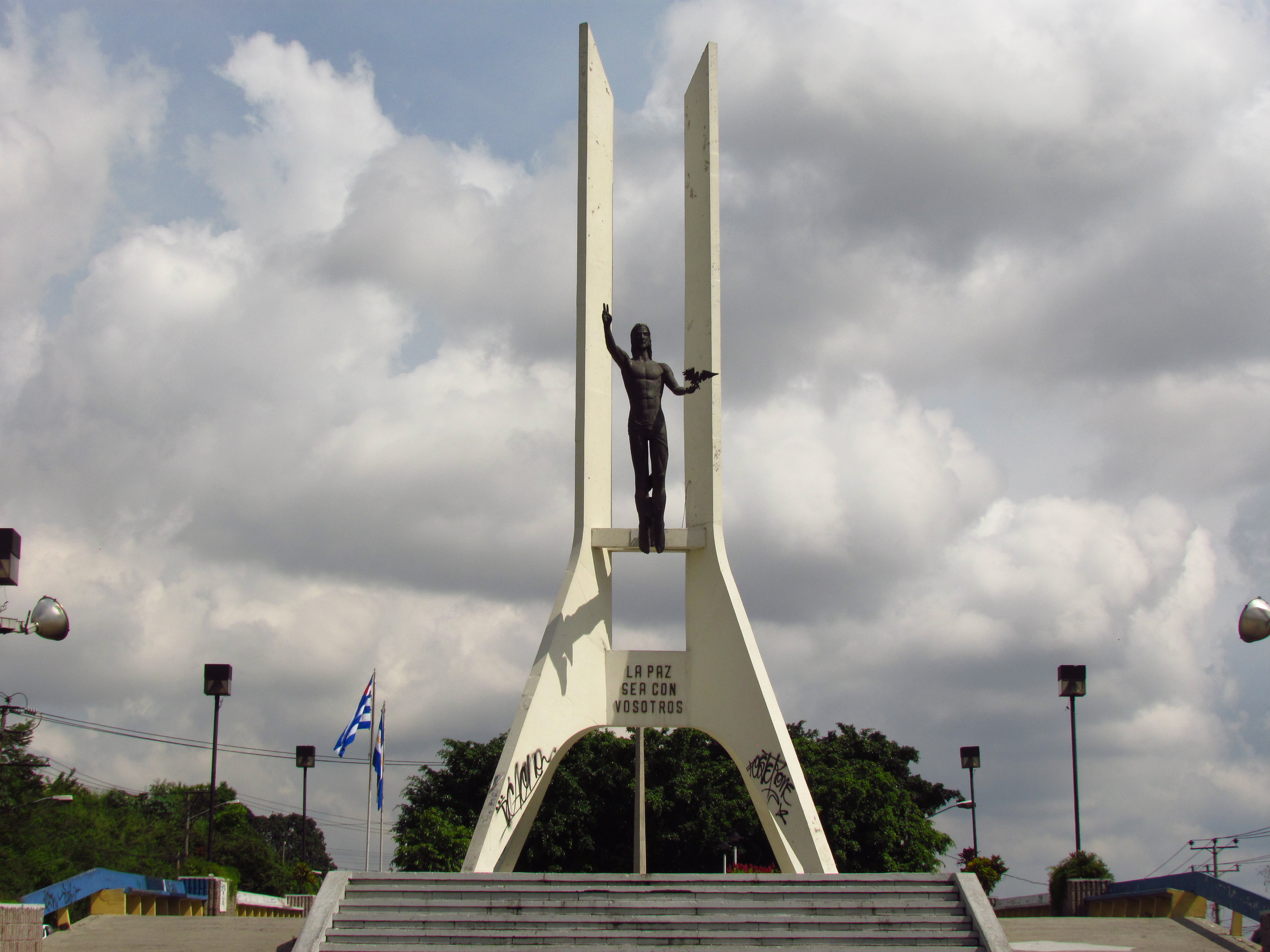
The Monument to Peace, built in 1994, to commemorate the Chapultepec Peace Accords.

The Chapultepec Peace Accords were signed on 16 January 1992, ending 12 years of civil war. The signing was celebrated by thousands of people flooding downtown San Salvador in the Plaza Gerardo Barrios and in La Libertad Park.

Starting in 2009, Mayor Norman Quijano worked to redevelop parks and historic buildings in the Rescate del Centro Histórico. His push to remove street vendors led to several riots in the area, but he managed to place the vendors in new markets where they can operate their own stalls.

== Municipal government ==
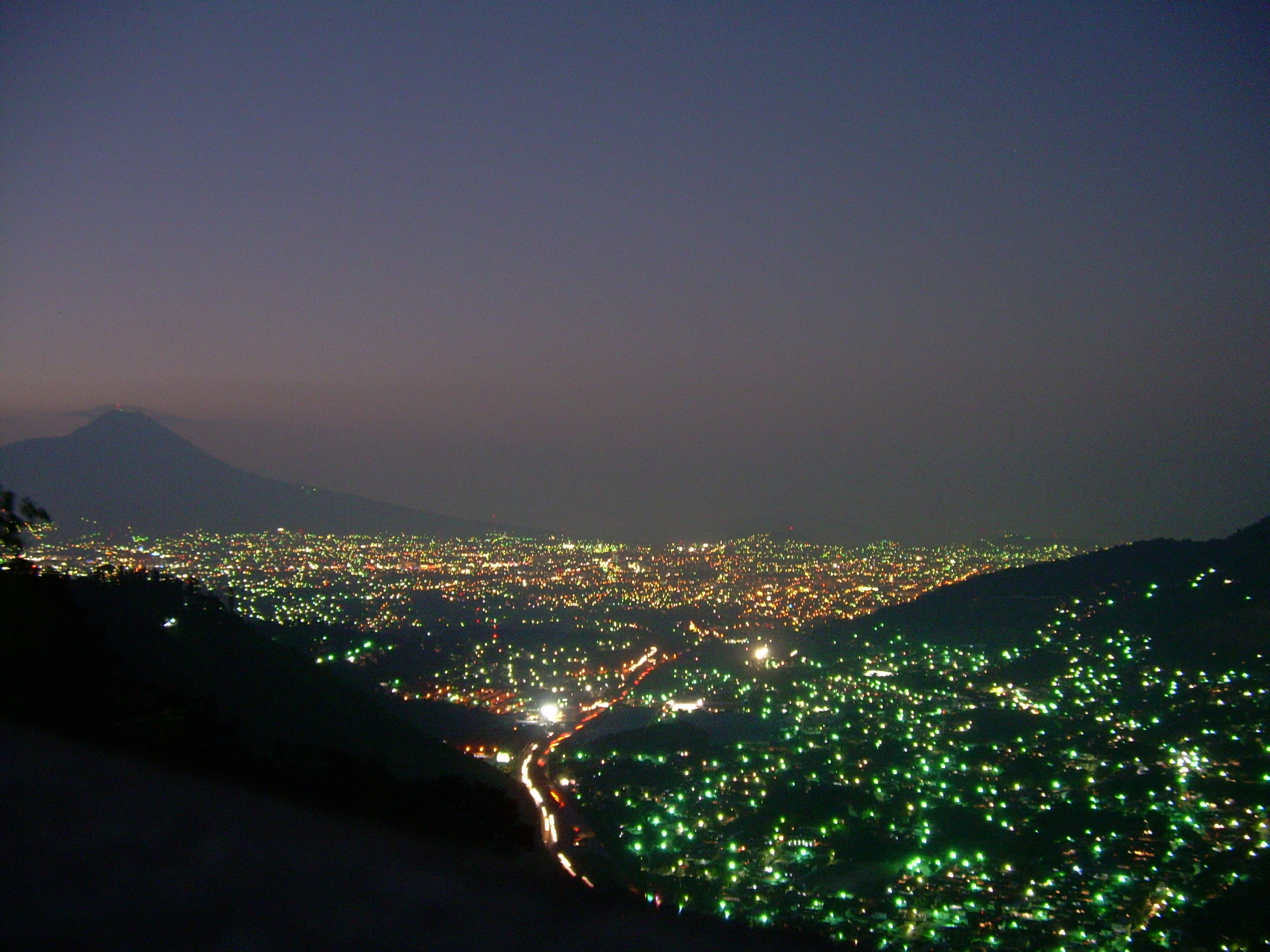
San Salvador as darkness descends on its greater metropolitan area

The cities in El Salvador, by constitutional provision (Article 203), are economically and administratively autonomous. San Salvador is governed by a council consisting of a mayor (elected by direct vote every three years, with an option to be re-elected), a trustee and two or more aldermen whose number varies in proportion to the population of the municipality. The functions and powers of this government are framed within the rules of the Municipal Code.

San Salvador's government is composed of departments, including the departments of festivals, parks, cemeteries, and finance. To safeguard the interests of the municipality, there is a board of metropolitan agents. Each of the six city districts also has a government department. The mayor is a member of the Council of Mayors of the Metropolitan Area of San Salvador (COAMSS), composed of fourteen local councils that make up the area known as Greater San Salvador.

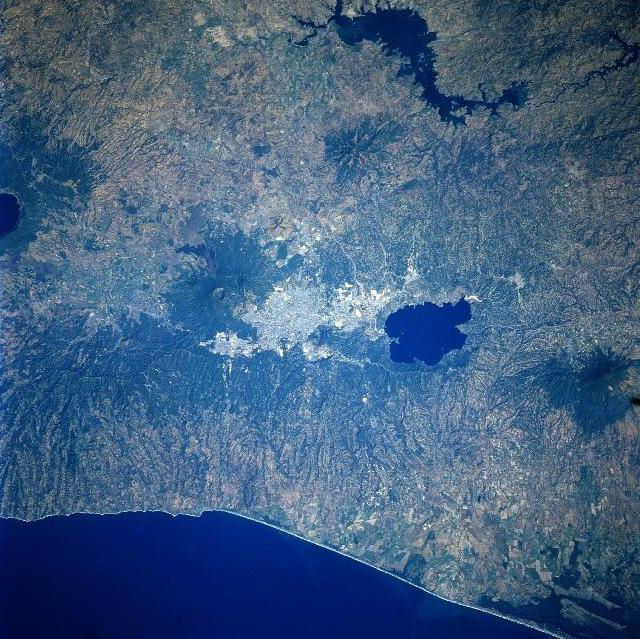
Satellite image of Greater San Salvador. East (right) of the city lies Lake Ilopango, and to the west (left) rises the San Salvador volcano. The beaches of the Central American Pacific coast (bottom) lie just south of the city.

=== City mayors since 1964 ===
- Gerardo Gonzalez Valladares (1958-1964)
- José Napoleón Duarte, PDC (1964–1970)
- Carlos Antonio Herrera Rebollo, PDC (1970–1974)
- José Antonio Morales Ehrlich, PDC (1974–1976)
- José Napoleón Gómez, Independent (1976–1978)
- Norman Duarte, Independent (1982–1985)
- José Antonio Morales Ehrlich, PDC (1985–1988)
- Armando Calderón Sol, ARENA (1988–1994)
- Mario Valiente, ARENA (1994–1997)
- Héctor Silva Argüello, FMLN (1997–2003)
- Carlos Rivas Zamora, FMLN (2003–2006)
- Violeta Menjívar, FMLN (2006–2009)
- Norman Quijano, ARENA (2009–2015)
- Nayib Bukele, FMLN (2015–2018)
- Ernesto Muyshondt, ARENA (2018–2021)
- Mario Durán, NI (2021–present)

=== Municipal districts ===
The municipality is further subdivided into districts governed by the municipal mayor and by a District board. There are seven districts in San Salvador, Districts 1–6 and the Historic Downtown.

The six districts:

- District One: Historic Downtown, Colonia Layco, Colonia La Rabida, Colonia Manzano. (Population: 118,325)
- District Two: Colonia Centro América, Colonia Miralvalle, Colonia Flor Blanca, Colonia Miramonte. (Population: 110,475)
- District Three: Colonia Escalón, Colonia San Benito, Colonia La Mascota, Colonia Maquilishuat. (Population: 51,325)
- District Four: Colonia San Francisco, Colonia La Cima (I-IV), Colonia La Floresta. (Population: 68,465)
- District Five: Colonia Monserrat, Colonia Modelo, Centro Urbano Candelaria. (Population: 126,290)
- District Six: Barrio San Esteban. (Population: 92,908)

Total population in all six districts: 567,788

== Geography ==
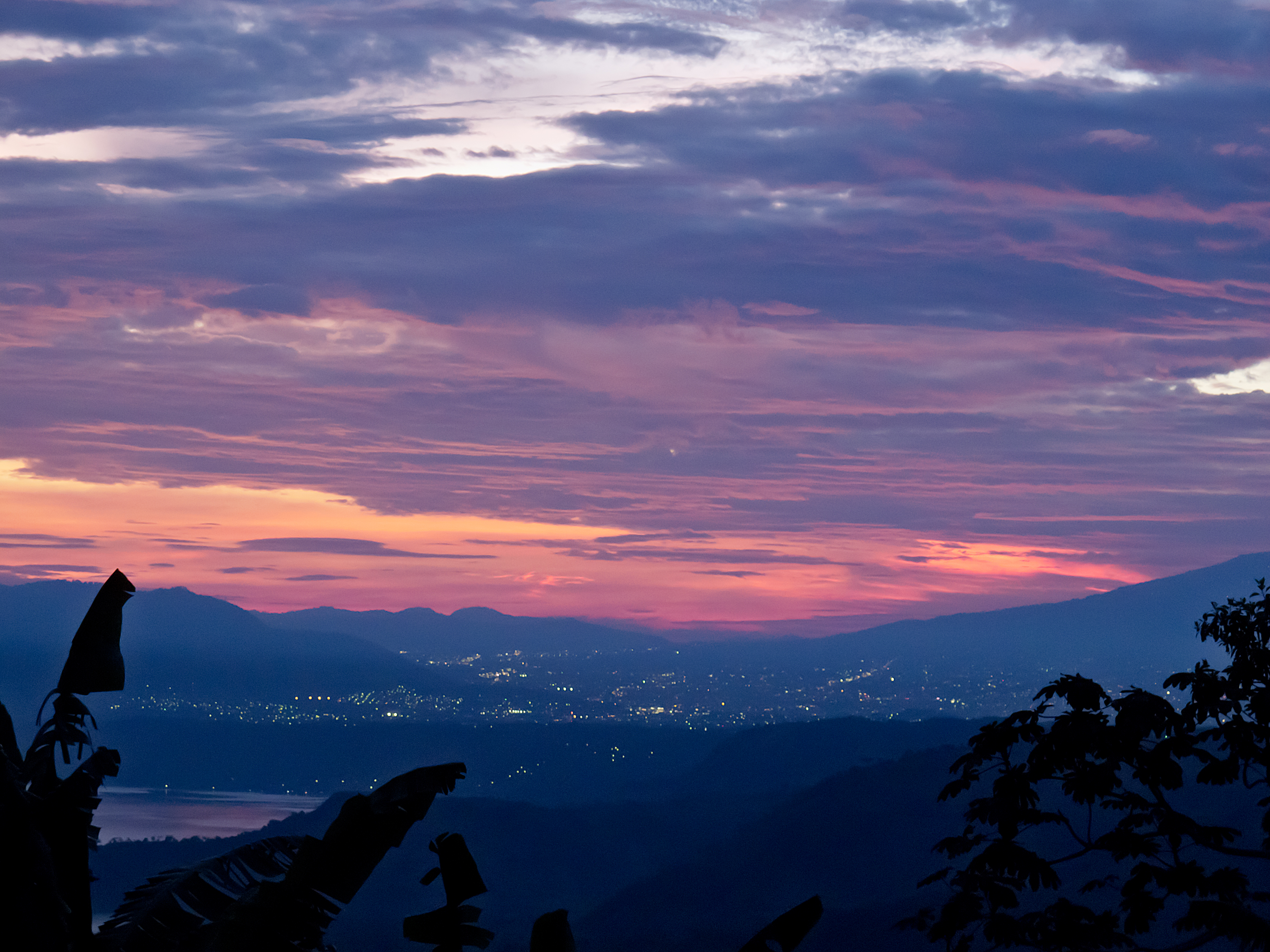
View of Lake Ilopango and the eastern San Salvador Valley

The city is located in the Boquerón Volcano Valley, a region of high seismic activity. The city's average elevation is 659 meters (2,162 feet) above sea level, but ranges from a highest point of 1,186 meters (3,891 feet) above sea level to a lowest point of 596 m (1,955 ft) above sea level.

The municipality is surrounded by these natural features of the landscape: the Acelhuate River on the east, the San Jacinto Hill on the south east, El Picacho Mountain and the Bicentennial Park on the West, North by the San Antonio River, southward by the Cordillera del Balsamo (Balsam Mountain Range); westward by the Boquerón Volcano and Cerro El Picacho, the highest point in the municipality at 1,929 m (6,329 ft).

El Boquerón Volcano was dormant since its last eruption in 1917, but has been active recently. East of the municipality lies the San Jacinto Hill and the caldera of Lake Ilopango, the largest natural body of water in the country with an area of 72 square kilometers (28 square miles). The caldera is seismically active, but has not erupted since 1880.

=== Climate ===
San Salvador has a tropical wet and dry climate under the Köppen climate classification, and enjoys very warm to hot weather all year round, with daily mean temperatures of 27 °C or 80.6 °F. Its average elevation of 658 meters (2,159 feet) causes the city to experience slightly cooler temperatures in the mornings, higher solar radiation, and greater diurnal air temperature variation (particularly during the dry season) than nearby cities at sea level such as Acajutla. Its weather cools from the months of November through February due to seasonal winds of the dry season. During these months one can expect a daily mean of 22.2 °C (72.0 °F). The hottest months of the year are April and May, during the transition from the dry season (November to April), to the rainy season (May to October). In April and May average maximum temperatures reach 32.2 °C (90.0 °F). The highest reading ever recorded was 38.5 °C (101.3 °F), the lowest was 8.2 °C (46.8 °F). The highest dew point was 27 °C (81 °F) and the lowest −10 °C (14 °F). Thunderstorms occur almost daily during the rainy season, mostly in the afternoon and through the night—by morning the sky clears and the days are usually sunny until the afternoon storms.

Climate data for San Salvador (Ilopango International Airport) 1991–2020, extremes 1957–present
Month	Jan	Feb	Mar	Apr	May	Jun	Jul	Aug	Sep	Oct	Nov	Dec	Year
Record high °C (°F)	36.0 (96.8)	36.1 (97.0)	37.2 (99.0)	38.4 (101.1)	36.7 (98.1)	34.6 (94.3)	34.5 (94.1)	35.1 (95.2)	33.3 (91.9)	35.6 (96.1)	35.3 (95.5)	35.7 (96.3)	38.4 (101.1)
Mean daily maximum °C (°F)	31.3 (88.3)	32.5 (90.5)	33.2 (91.8)	33.0 (91.4)	31.3 (88.3)	30.3 (86.5)	30.8 (87.4)	30.7 (87.3)	29.8 (85.6)	29.7 (85.5)	30.1 (86.2)	30.7 (87.3)	31.1 (88.0)
Daily mean °C (°F)	23.1 (73.6)	23.9 (75.0)	24.7 (76.5)	25.4 (77.7)	24.9 (76.8)	24.3 (75.7)	24.3 (75.7)	24.2 (75.6)	23.7 (74.7)	23.6 (74.5)	23.3 (73.9)	23.1 (73.6)	24.0 (75.2)
Mean daily minimum °C (°F)	17.5 (63.5)	18.1 (64.6)	19.0 (66.2)	20.4 (68.7)	20.9 (69.6)	20.5 (68.9)	20.0 (68.0)	20.1 (68.2)	20.1 (68.2)	19.9 (67.8)	18.8 (65.8)	17.9 (64.2)	19.4 (66.9)
Record low °C (°F)	11.9 (53.4)	12.0 (53.6)	13.0 (55.4)	12.0 (53.6)	12.0 (53.6)	15.5 (59.9)	13.5 (56.3)	12.2 (54.0)	15.0 (59.0)	12.5 (54.5)	11.1 (52.0)	12.0 (53.6)	11.1 (52.0)
Average rainfall mm (inches)	1.7 (0.07)	1.2 (0.05)	10.7 (0.42)	42.1 (1.66)	192.8 (7.59)	264.5 (10.41)	302.1 (11.89)	318.5 (12.54)	331.9 (13.07)	245.4 (9.66)	65.0 (2.56)	5.6 (0.22)	1,781.3 (70.13)
Average precipitation days (≥ 1.0 mm)	0.3	0.4	1.0	3.6	11.2	14.5	16.1	18.3	18.0	13.0	4.1	0.9	101.4
Average relative humidity (%)	69	68	68	72	80	83	81	83	86	84	77	73	77.1
Average dew point °C (°F)	15.7 (60.3)	16.0 (60.8)	16.9 (62.4)	19.0 (66.2)	21.1 (70.0)	21.5 (70.7)	20.7 (69.3)	21.0 (69.8)	21.5 (70.7)	20.7 (69.3)	18.3 (64.9)	16.6 (61.9)	19.1 (66.4)
Mean monthly sunshine hours	301	277	294	243	220	174	239	257	180	211	267	294	2,957
Source 1: Ministerio de Medio Ambiente y Recursos Naturales, NOAA
Source 2: Danish Meteorological Institute (sun 1931–1960), Meteo Climat (record highs and lows), Weather.Directory

=== Topography ===
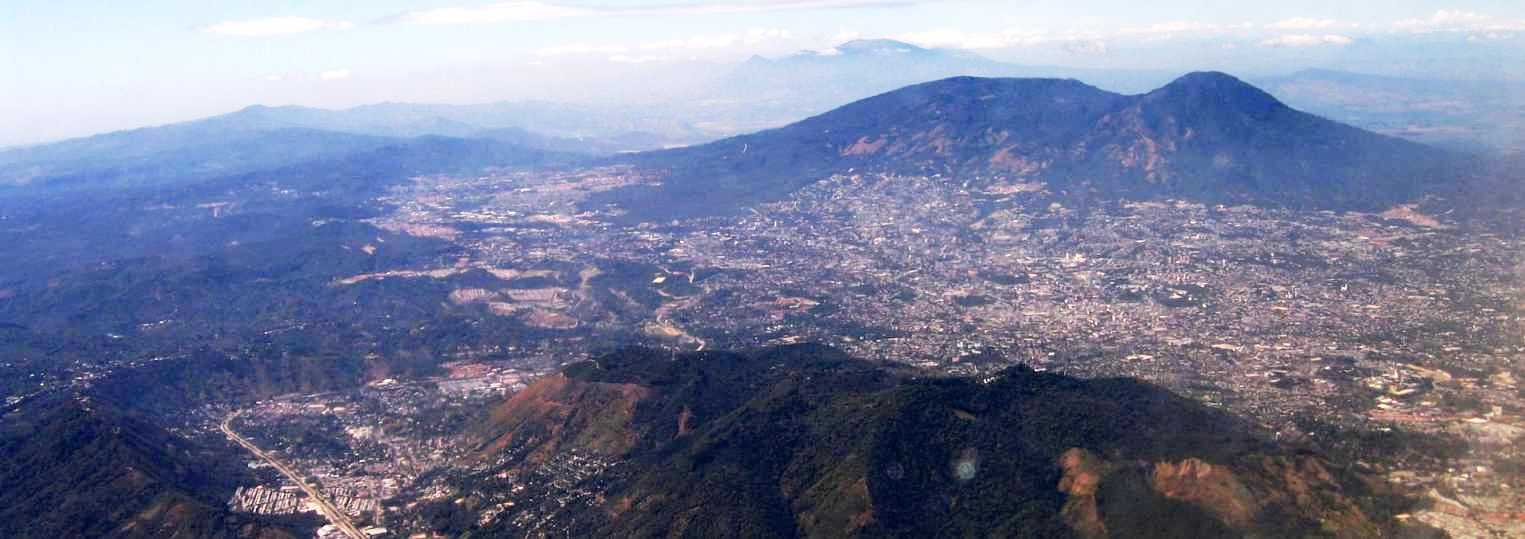
San Salvador City lies at the foot of San Salvador volcano.

San Salvador has a very hilly terrain; there are few parts of the municipality where the elevation is consistent. The city shares many topographic features with neighboring municipalities in the San Salvador and the La Libertad departments.

The most notable topographical feature visible in San Salvador and its metropolitan area is the Boquerón Volcano, which looms over this region in its foothills at a height of 1,893 meters (6,211 feet) above sea level.

San Salvador shares Cerro El Picacho, 1,931 meters (6,335 feet) above sea level, with the neighboring municipality of Mejicanos.

The portion of the Cordillera del Bálsamo (Balsam Mountain Range) that sits in the Municipality has an average elevation of 1,030 meters (3,379 feet) above sea level. The Cordillera del Bálsamo is named after the Myroxylon balsamum tree, one of two species of Central American and South American trees in the family Fabaceae (Leguminosae). The tree, often called Quina or Bálsamo, is well known in the western world as the source of Balsam of Peru and Tolu balsam. El Salvador is the main exporter of these resins, which are still extracted manually.

El Cerro de San Jacinto (San Jacinto Hill), is located on the eastern border of the municipality and is shared with Soyapango, Santo Tomás and San Marcos. The summit is located at 1,153 meters (3,783 feet) above sea level. The hill was once famous for the San Jacinto Cable Car and Park located at its summit, but the facilities were eventually abandoned. Soil types include regosol, latosol, and andosol, as well as soils derived from andesitic and basaltic rocks.

=== Bodies of water ===
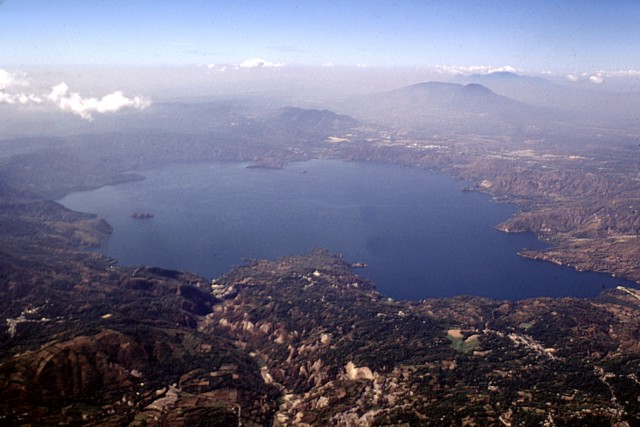
Aerial view of Lake Ilopango caldera

The river nearest San Salvador is the Acelhuate, which is 2.2 km (1.4 mi) long. Although not within the municipality, it forms a natural boundary between San Salvador and Soyapango. The Acelhuate served as a water source for San Salvador during the late 1800s and early 1900s, but due to urbanization is now polluted. There are small streams running down from Lake Ilopango, and a few old aqueduct systems, but the municipality itself has no major bodies of water.

Lake Ilopango, although not located in the municipality, is the closest large body of water, being only minutes away from the San Salvador historic center. The lake is also the largest natural body of water in the country, with an area of 72 km^{2} (28 sq mi). The Cerrón Grande Reservoir, 78 km (48 mi) north of San Salvador, was formed by damming the Lempa River in the municipalities of Potonico, (Chalatenango) and Jutiapa (Cabañas). The Cerrón Grande Dam provides a substantial portion of the region's electricity.

== Demographics ==
Spanish is the language spoken by virtually all inhabitants. English is spoken more widely than in the past, due mainly to cultural influences from the United States, especially in entertainment, and the large number of Salvadoran emigrants returned from the United States. According to the 2007 Census, 72.3% of the population of San Salvador is mestizo, while 25.8% is white, mostly of Spanish ancestry, and a small portion being of French or German descent.

In 2015, San Salvador was projected to have a population of 257,754 inhabitants, accounting for about 3.99% of the country's population, while the metropolitan area had 1,767,102 inhabitants, comprising 27.4% of the country's total population.

=== Religion ===
Religious background San Salvador
Religion	Percent
Roman Catholic	56.6%
Protestant	28.3%
None	11.4%
Mormon	2.5%
Other	1%
Jewish	0.2%

The population of San Salvador is predominantly Roman Catholic, with a significant minority of Protestants. There is more diversity of religion than in most Latin American countries. The Protestant population is mostly Evangelical. One of the largest Protestant churches in the city is the Iglesia Cristiana Josue (from the Assemblies of God), another is the Tabernaculo Biblico Bautista, Amigos de Israel (Bible Baptist Tabernacle, Friends of Israel). There are also members of the Church of Jesus Christ of Latter-day Saints, which opened the San Salvador El Salvador Temple in 2011. There are also smaller Latter-day Saints chapels in Districts 1 and 3.

As in most of the country, Roman Catholicism plays a prominent role in the celebration of holidays, including Las Fiestas Agostinas (The August Festivals) in honor of Jesus Christ, the Patron saint of El Salvador, referred to as El Salvador del Mundo (The Savior of the World). These events are becoming less prominent with a sharp decline in the Roman Catholic population during the past decade. San Salvador is also home to about 3,500 Jews; the Jewish community is still robust, but less so since the 1980s, as a large number of them left with the start of the Salvadoran Civil War. Many Jews had migrated to El Salvador during World War II due to the work of José Castellanos Contreras, the Salvadoran diplomatic Consul General in Geneva, Switzerland, who helped a Jewish-Hungarian businessman named Gyorgy Mandl save up to 40,000 Jews in Central Europe from the Nazi persecution by giving them Salvadoran nationality papers. The city has a small community of Palestinians, mostly descendants of Palestinian Christian families who immigrated from Palestine in the late 19th and early 20th century, with the highest rate of immigration between 1910 and 1925.

== Culture ==
San Salvador is rich in Spanish heritage, and its historical center contains architecture of a kind not found elsewhere in Latin America. The Metropolitan Cathedral was built in the 1950s combining Baroque and eclectic styles of architecture. The National palace, built in 1905, is a mix of Gothic, Neoclassical, and Renaissance Revival architecture. The National Theater is the oldest theater in Central America, being built in 1917 in the French Renaissance Revival style with details in the Rococo, Romantic and Art Nouveau architectural styles. The building contains three levels of seats, including a Presidential box at the center of the second level, and has seating for 650 people. The structure is surmounted by an ellipsoidal dome, the interior of which is adorned with a mural painted by Carlos Cañas and a crystal chandelier.

San Salvador is also home to the museum Museo de Arte de El Salvador (MARTE), whose collection includes artworks dating from the mid-19th century to the contemporary era. The museum has held temporary exhibitions of works by internationally renowned artists like Picasso, Rembrandt, Salvador Dalí and Joan Miró. The Museo Nacional de Antropología (MUNA) or National Museum of Anthropology, founded in 1883 by David Joaquín Guzmán, has exhibits on human settlements, agriculture, artisans, commerce and trade, religion, arts and communication. The museum aims to foster cultural awareness for Salvadorans through exhibitions, research, publications and educational programs.

In 2011, the Union of Ibero-American Capital Cities selected San Salvador as a "Latin American capital of culture", recognizing San Salvador's cultural diversity.

The city government is restoring the downtown area, with the goal of celebrating the city's past and promoting cultural diversity.

=== City symbols ===
The symbols of the city are the Monumento al Divino Salvador del Mundo, shield, flag, anthem, and staff of office. The first three were created as a result of a contest launched in 1943. The shield (designed by the painter José Mejía Vides) is divided into four quadrants: the two quadrants at the top right and bottom left have blue and white fields symbolizing the national flag; the top left quadrant displays a symbolic emerald necklace; and the lower right contains the bell of the Church of La Merced, representing the 1811 Independence Movement, when José Matías Delgado rang the bells.

The flag was designed at the request of the city government. The anthem was written by Carlos Bustamante (lyrics) and Ciriaco de Jesús Alas (music).

The municipal staff shows a series of figures and symbols relating to local history. From top to bottom these images are: a native Amerindian, first mayor Diego de Olguín, Carlos V of Spain, the Royal Decree which gave San Salvador its name, Mayor Antonio Gutiérrez, the priest José Matías Delgado, the seal of liberation of 1811, the 1821 independence seal, the shield of the Municipal Freedom Union, the national emblem, and God.

On 5 May 2015, Mayor Nayib Bukele presented the redesigned city shield and flag. The new city coat of arms is silver as a symbol of purity; it has the flag of El Salvador in the center, and a ribbon on the bottom with the date 1834, the year San Salvador was declared capital of Central America. On the sides it has two swords: to the left the sword of Francisco Morazán, and to the right, the sword of Gerardo Barrios, representing his past victories. A crown of laurels encircles the coat of arms, which is also surrounded by 6 stars, representing the 6 districts that form the city.

== Economy ==
Economic activity is highly concentrated to the country's capital city, San Salvador. The metropolitan area accounts for 3% of the national territory but 70% of public and private investment is made there. The economy of San Salvador, Antiguo Cuscatlán, and Santa Tecla is a mixed one composed mainly of services, private education, banking, business headquartering, and industrial manufacturing. Other municipalities in the metropolitan area depend either on industry, like Soyapango and Ilopango, on public services, like Mejicanos, or on power generation, as in Nejapa and Apopa. The other municipalities have not developed their own economies, however, they have provided the workforce required for industry in neighboring municipalities.

San Salvador, as well as the rest of the country, has used the U.S. dollar as its currency of exchange since 2001. Under the Monetary Integration Law, El Salvador adopted the U.S. dollar as a legal tender alongside the colón. This decision came about as an attempt to encourage foreign investors to launch new companies in El Salvador, saving them the inconvenience of conversion to other currencies. San Salvador's economy is mostly based on remittances, followed by service and retail sector, rather by industry or manufacturing.

=== Financial sector ===
San Salvador is home to the great majority of corporations in the country, and supports many commercial activities, including food and beverage production; the pharmaceutical and chemical industries; the sale of automobiles, handicrafts, and construction materials; as well as appliance repair. Most national companies have their headquarters in San Salvador, which is also home to regional offices for transnational entities. Unicomer Group, Almacenes Simán, Grupo Roble, Grupo Real, Excel Automotríz, and Grupo Q all have their central offices in San Salvador. Since the early 2010s there has been a boom in the construction of call centers providing services to national and international companies alike.

San Salvador lacks a consolidated financial district; this is mainly due to the lack of urban planning that has plagued the city since the aftermath of the Salvadoran Civil War in 1992. Some clusters have formed, however, in an organic manner; today most of the banking and telecommunications are concentrated along the Alameda Manuel Enrique Araujo in District Two. Business complexes and towers have sprouted in the commercial districts of Colonia Escalón and Colonia San Benito, both in District Three of the Salvadoran capital.

==== World Trade Center San Salvador ====
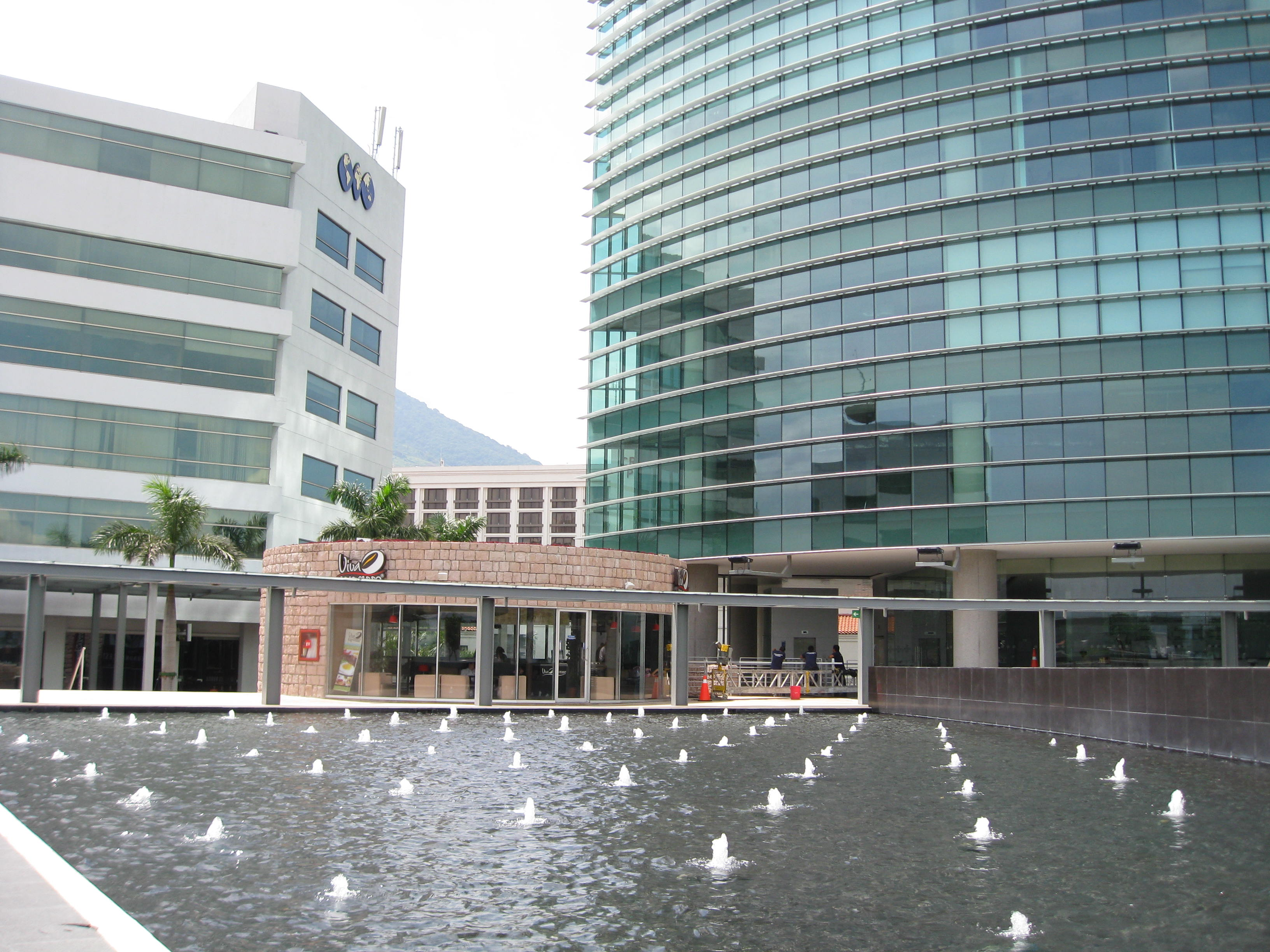
Torre Futura

The World Trade Center San Salvador is located in District 3 (Colonia Escalón) at Avenida Norte and Calle del Mirador. The World Trade Center is interconnected to two hotels (one of which is the Crowne Plaza Hotel), a convention center and a commercial center containing retail shops and restaurants. As of October 2012, the center consists of two towers of 8 levels each, with a total of 13,000 m^{2} (139,931 sq ft) of office space. Since their completion, the first two towers have maintained a 100% occupancy rate with multinational companies, embassies, and firms such as Banco Multisectorial de Inversiones (BMI), Ericsson, Continental Airlines, Microsoft, Inter-American Development Bank, and Banco Promérica maintaining offices there.

==== Centro Financiero Gigante ====
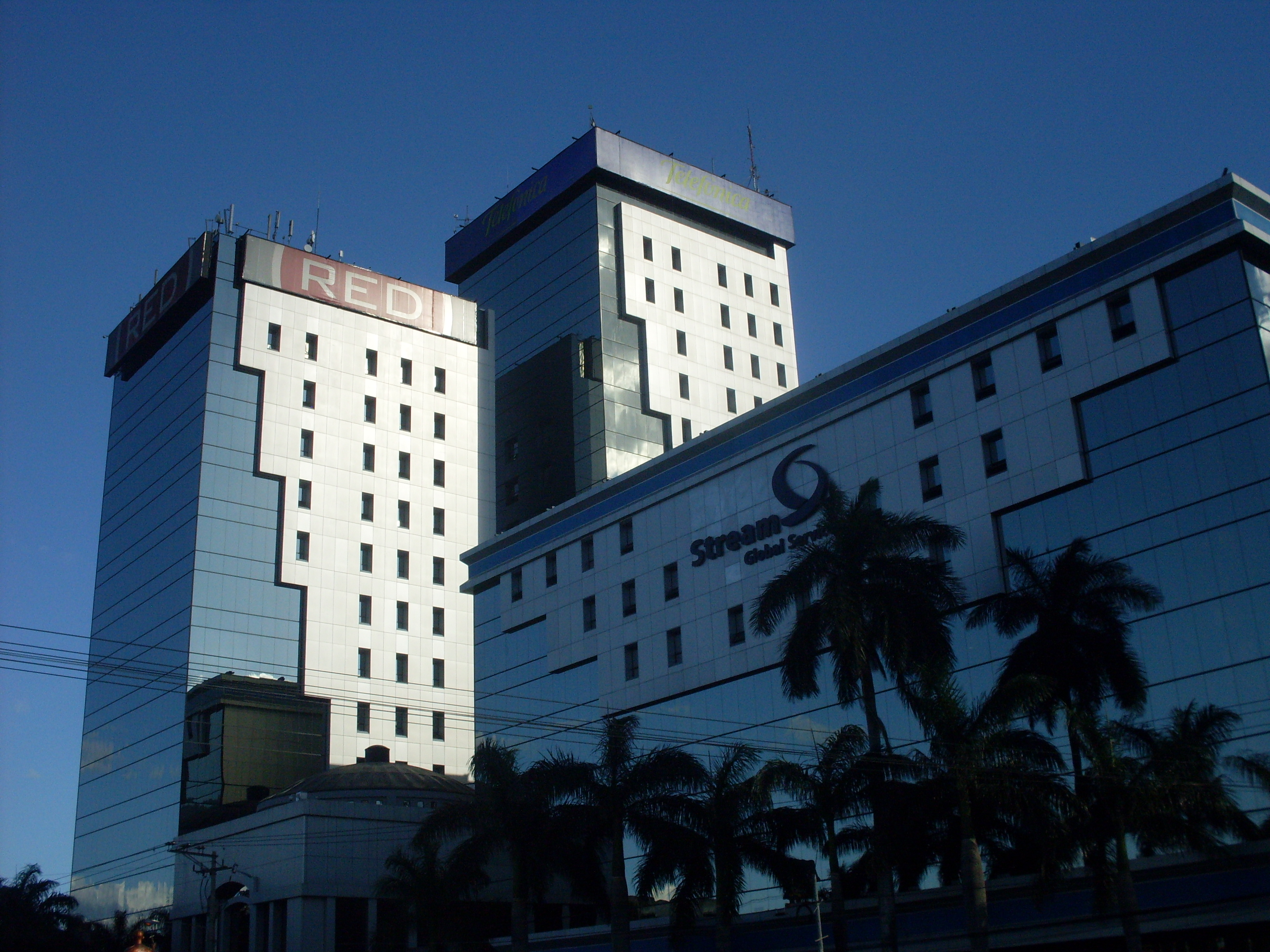
Centro Financiero Gigante

Centro Financiero Gigante is a complex of office buildings consisting of five towers, the highest of which is 77 meters (253 feet) tall and has 19 floors. It is a phased project which began with the construction of the two towers. After several years the number of buildings has increased, and it has become one of the most significant business complexes in San Salvador. The tallest tower is occupied by the Telefónica phone company, the next tallest tower is used by RED Business Communication Systems. The complex also includes the Banco Azteca center, Stream Global Services representing Dell in Central America, The Israeli Embassy of San Salvador, Tigo, call centers, and other small offices and banks. The project started in 1997 with Phase I, the construction of the two tallest towers. In Phase II a seven-story-high tower for the old Dell company in Central America was built, and in Phase III a 12-story-high tower for Tigo and a 10-story-high tower for Telemovil. The final phase was remodeling of the Telemovil building to convert it into the Banco Azteca Center.

==== Alameda Manuel Enrique Araujo and Zona Rosa ====
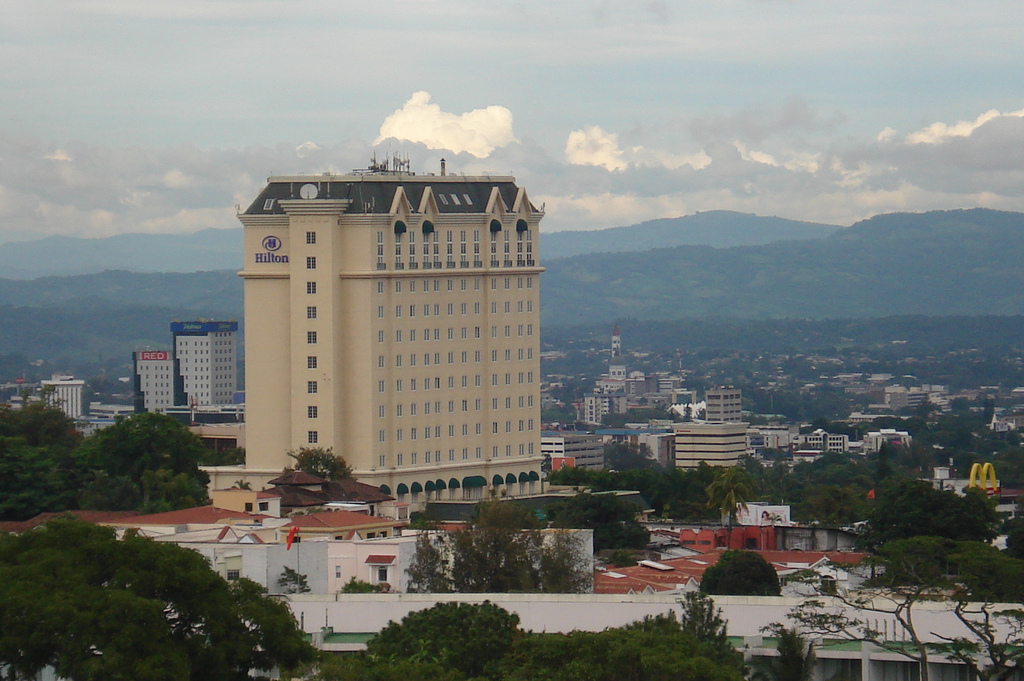
Barcelo Hotel

Along Alameda Manuel Enrique Araujo and Zona Rosa there are many businesses, banks, and financial centers, government institutions and museums. These include AFP Confia, the Superior Council of Public Health, the HSBC Central Office, AFP Crecer, the Ministry of Public Works, the Centro Internacional de Feria y Convenciones (International Center of Fairs and Conventions), the Presidential Palace, the Museo Nacional de Antropología David J. Guzman (National Museum of Anthropology), the Banco Promerica Financial Center, the Ministry of Tourism, the Channel 2 & 4 Studio Center, the Channel 6 Studio Center, and the Centro de Compañía de Alumbrado Eléctrico de San Salvador (CAESS-Centro) or Central Electric Lighting Company of San Salvador.

=== Communications ===
A relatively large proportion of residents have telephones, televisions, and access to the internet, and several communications companies have their headquarters in San Salvador. The largest are Tigo, Claro-Telecom, Movistar-Telefónica, and Digicel.

=== Services and retail shopping ===
San Salvador's economy is based mostly on the service sector. The city has many restaurants and shopping malls, including Metrocentro, the largest shopping mall in Central America, as well as retail stores such as Wal-Mart, Office Max, and a Pricesmart warehouse club. The tallest shopping mall in the region, Centro Comercial Galerias, was built around and over an old mansion, La Casona, dating from the late 1950s, which was home to a family of Spanish origin, the Guirolas.

=== Industry ===
San Salvador has small industrial zones scattered throughout the municipality, although most of them are concentrated in the eastern section near the border with Soyapango. Much of the industry is related to food processing, beverage manufacturing, and sugar refining. Construction materials ranging from ceramic tiles to concrete blocks and concrete are produced in large quantities; plastics extrusion, including the production of piping, is also an important industry.

Industrias La Constancia, El Salvador's largest brewer and bottler of purified water, dominates the Salvadoran export market of beers and bottled water. The company became part of the second largest brewer in the world, SABMiller, in 2005. Its flagship brand is Pilsener, a pilsner style lager beer, the national beer of El Salvador. In 2011, La Constancia centralized its operations and opened its new headquarters in San Salvador, where it moved in 1928 from the Santa Ana Department. The company produces the Agua Cristal brand of bottled water, the best selling in El Salvador and in the Central American region. The Coca-Cola company uses the La Constancia installations to manufacture its beverage brands sold in El Salvador and the rest of Central America.

Unilever has a plant in San Salvador. Its products include foods, beverages, cleaning agents and personal care products. Unilever manufactures all its products sold in Central America in San Salvador.

== Architecture ==
San Salvador's colonial structures, especially its colonial cathedrals, have been destroyed over time by historic earthquakes, consequently Modernist and Gothic style cathedrals have taken their place. During the Salvadoran civil war, large building construction projects were halted and eventually cancelled due to the collapse of the economy; the remainder of early Modernist office and hotel buildings collapsed during the 1986 San Salvador earthquake and the January 2001 and February 2001 El Salvador earthquakes, while the few remaining old buildings were left uninhabitable. Only a few large structures have survived the earthquakes, including the Sheraton Presidente San Salvador Hotel and the Hilton Princess San Salvador Hotel. The seismic nature of the San Salvador area has until recently hindered the construction of high rise buildings and skyscrapers in the city; however, with new technological advances and the advent of earthquake-resistant structures, high rise buildings have begun rising over San Salvador. Today the city has monuments, plazas, stadiums, high rise buildings, large malls and cathedrals built in Neo-Gothic, Modernist, Populuxe, Googie, Streamline Moderne, Art Deco and Futurist style architecture.

=== Churches ===
- Iglesia El Carmen
- Iglesia El Rosario
- Iglesia El Calvario

=== Modern structures ===
- Centro Financiero Gigante
- Torre Roble
- Torre Terra Alta
- Torre Alisios 115
- Torre 515 Avenida La Capilla
- Torre 525 Avenida La Capilla
- Torres 105 Campestre
- Torre El Pedregal (Tallest tower in San Salvador City)
- Sheraton Presidente San Salvador Hotel
- Hilton Princess San Salvador Hotel

=== Populux, Googie, Streamline Moderne and Art Deco structures ===
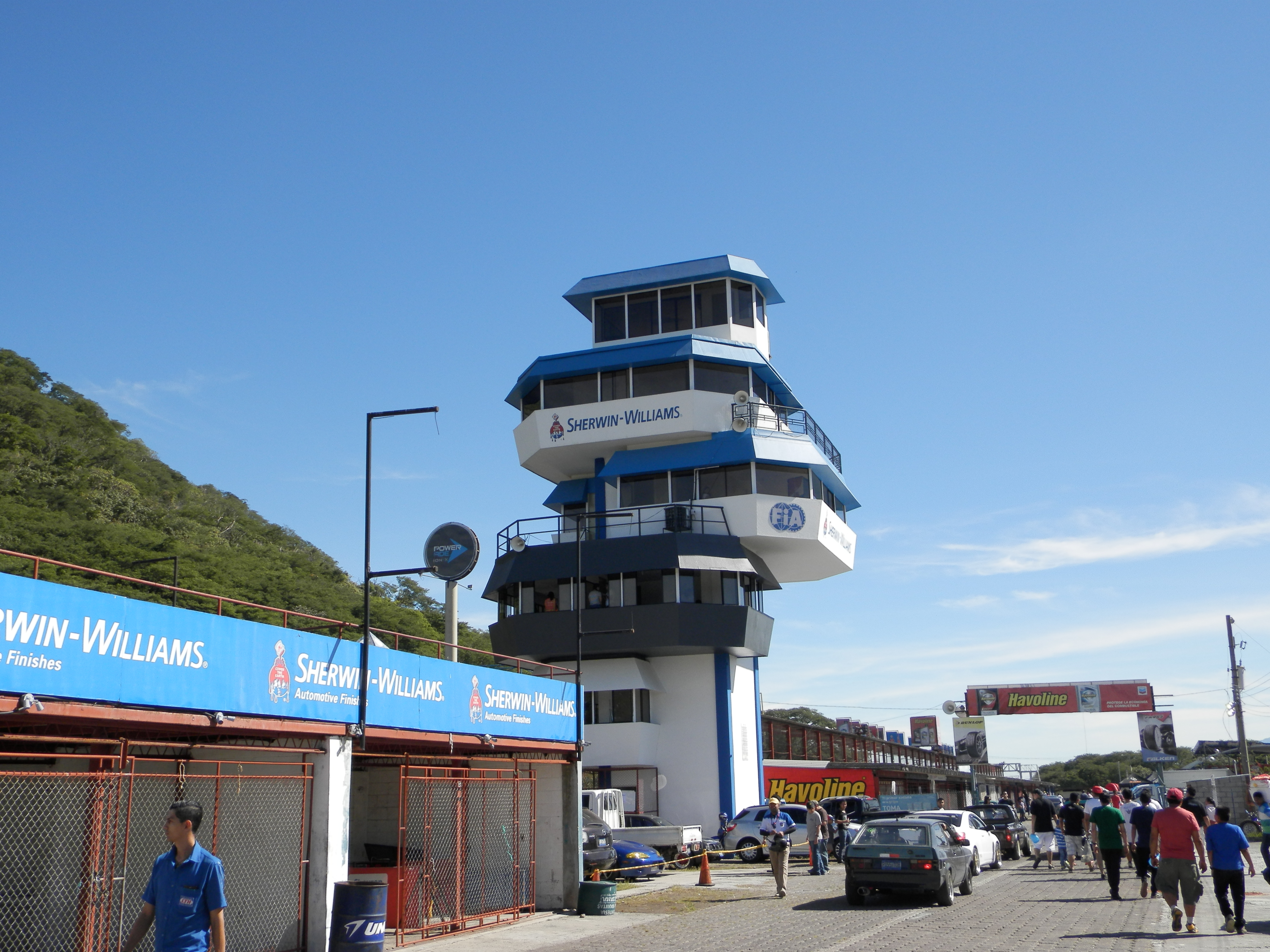
Control tower at the El Jabalí international Autodromo

- Palacio de los Deportes Carlos "El Famoso" Hernández (Stadium)
- Hospital Capilla Divina Providencia (Church where Óscar Romero was assassinated)
- Gimnasio Nacional José Adolfo Pineda
- Monumento al Divino Salvador del Mundo
- Monumento Hermano Bienvenido a Casa
- Multiplaza (El Salvador)
- Monumento a la Revolución (El Salvador)
- Monumento a La Constitución de El Salvador
- Ilopango International Airport
- Centro Internacional de Ferias y Convenciones (CIFCO)
- Estadio Jorge "Mágico" González

=== Futurist structures ===
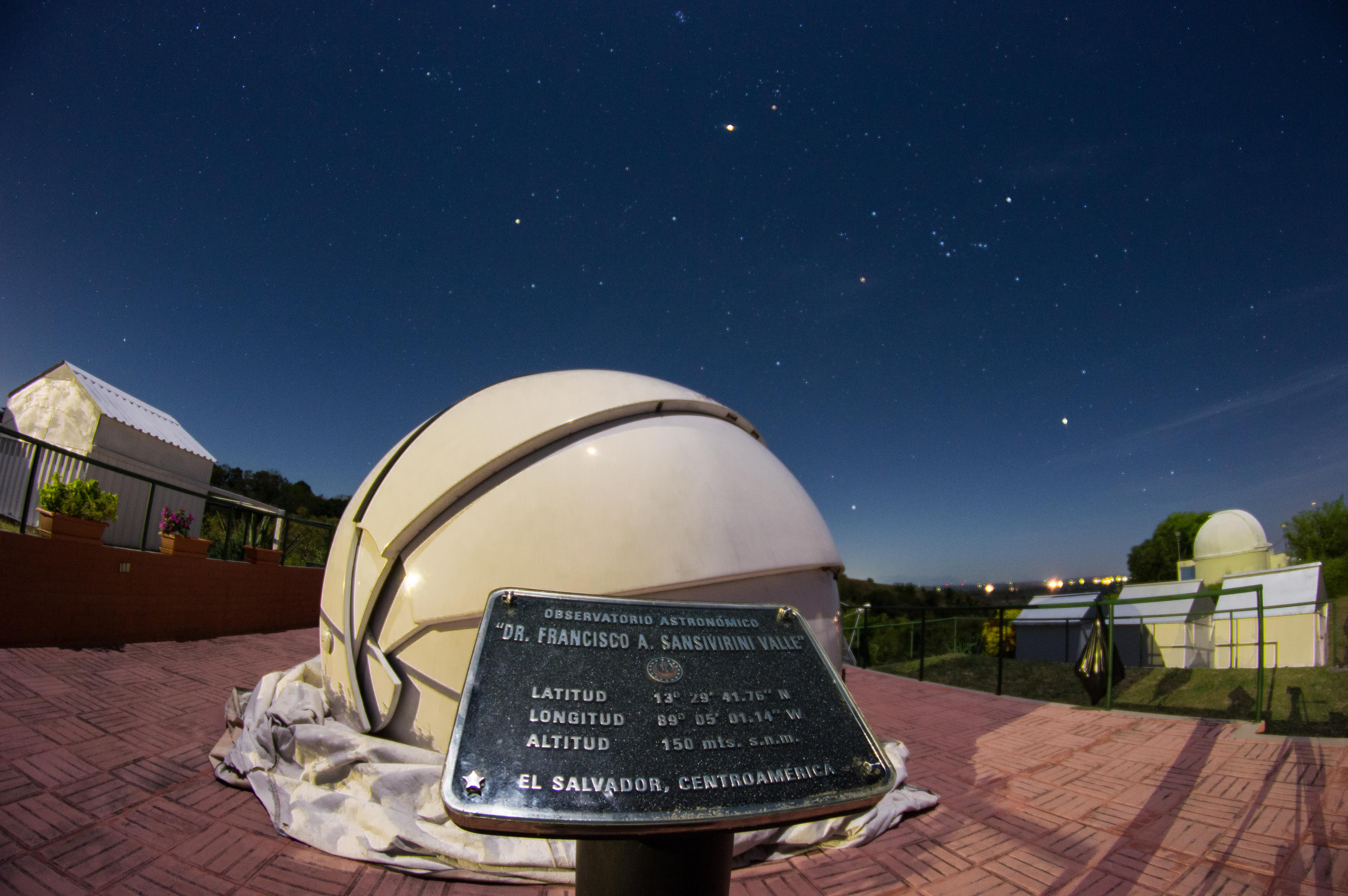
Dr. Prudencio Llach Observatory

- Torre Futura
- Torre Cuscatlán
- Torre Millenium
- Edificio Insigne
- Edificio Avante
- El Salvador International Airport is going through a large scale modernization and retrofitting, transitioning from a modern style to a futurist style architecture when its finished.

== Tourism and sites of interest ==
=== Historic Downtown ===
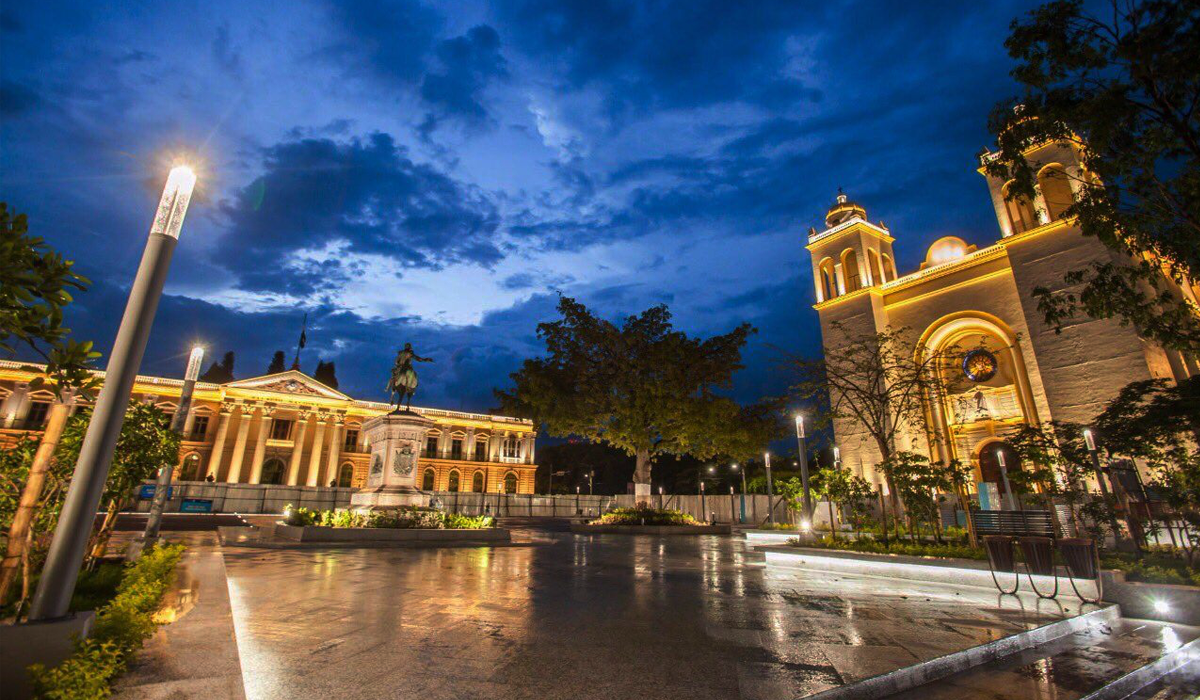
Historic Downtown San Salvador

The historic downtown of San Salvador includes the area where the capital city of El Salvador has been located since the 16th century. The original buildings of the Spanish colony have been mostly destroyed by natural disasters over the years. The few notable surviving buildings were erected in the late 19th and early 20th centuries. Mayor Norman Quijano started several large projects with the goal of restoring the former grandeur of the buildings in the center. One such project is to reroute the public transportation routes so they no longer pass through the historic downtown. Another project is the relocation of unauthorised street vendors to a designated public market.

==== National Palace ====
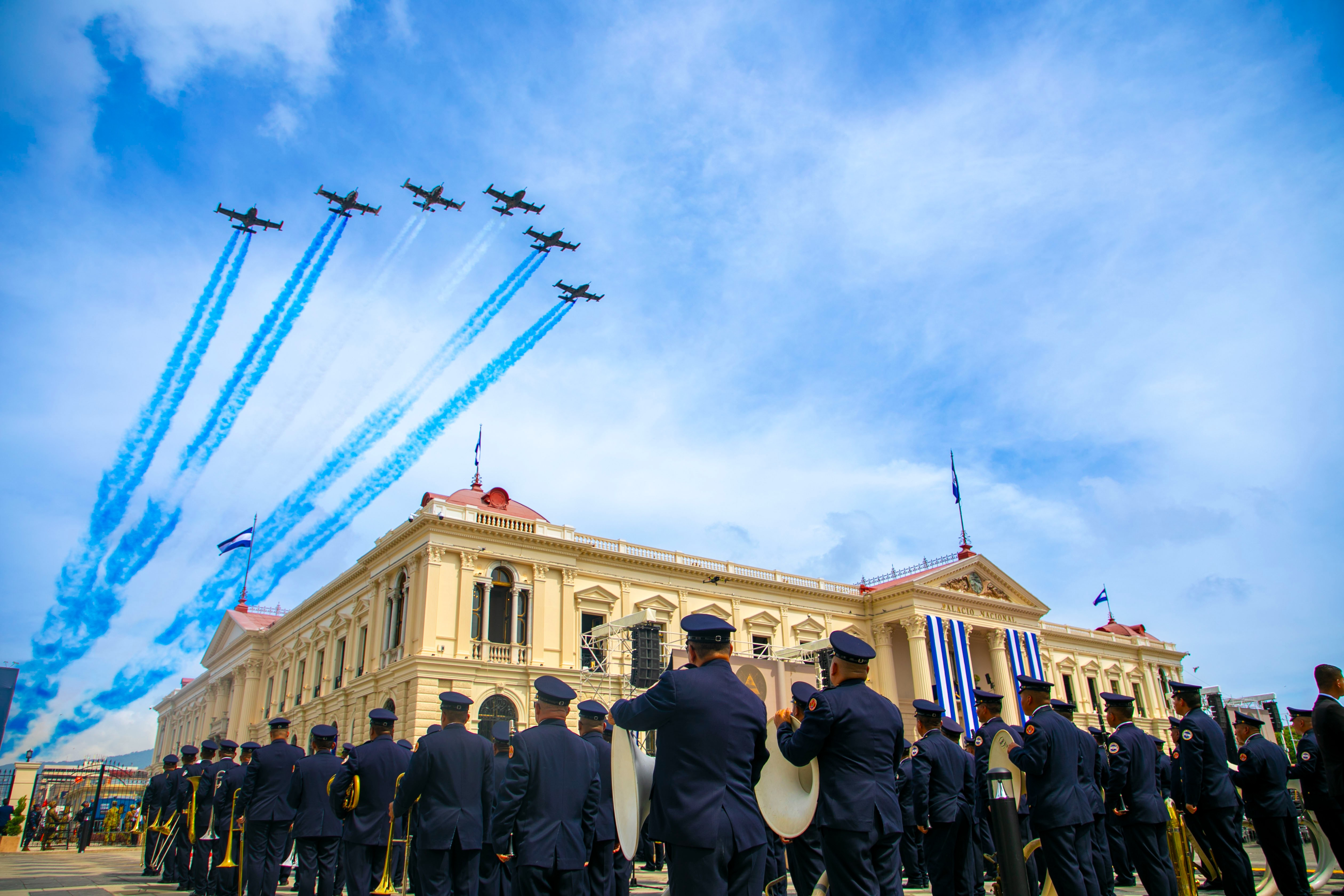
National Palace of El Salvador

The current National Palace building replaced the old National Palace built in 1866–1870, which was destroyed by fire on 19 December 1889. The construction, done between 1905 and 1911, was the work of engineer José Emilio Alcaine, under the direction of the foreman Pascasio González Erazo. To finish the project, legislation was passed that collected one colon for every quintal of coffee exported. The materials used were imported from several European countries including Germany, Italy and Belgium. The Palace's facilities were occupied by government offices until 1974.

The building contains four main rooms and 101 secondary rooms; each of the four main rooms has a distinctive color. The Red Room (Salon Rojo) is used for receptions held by the Salvadoran Foreign Ministry, and the ceremonial presentation of ambassadors' credentials. It has been used for ceremonial purposes since the administration of General Maximiliano Hernández Martínez. The Yellow Room (Salon Amarillo) is used as an office for the President of the Republic, while the Pink Room (Salon Rosado) housed the Supreme Court and later the Ministry of Defense. The Blue Room (Salon Azul) was the meeting place of the Legislature of El Salvador from 1906, and its classical architecture with Ionian, Corinthian and Roman elements is notable. The room is now called the Salvadoran Parliament in commemoration of its former purpose, and was declared a National Historic Landmark in 1974.

==== Metropolitan Cathedral ====
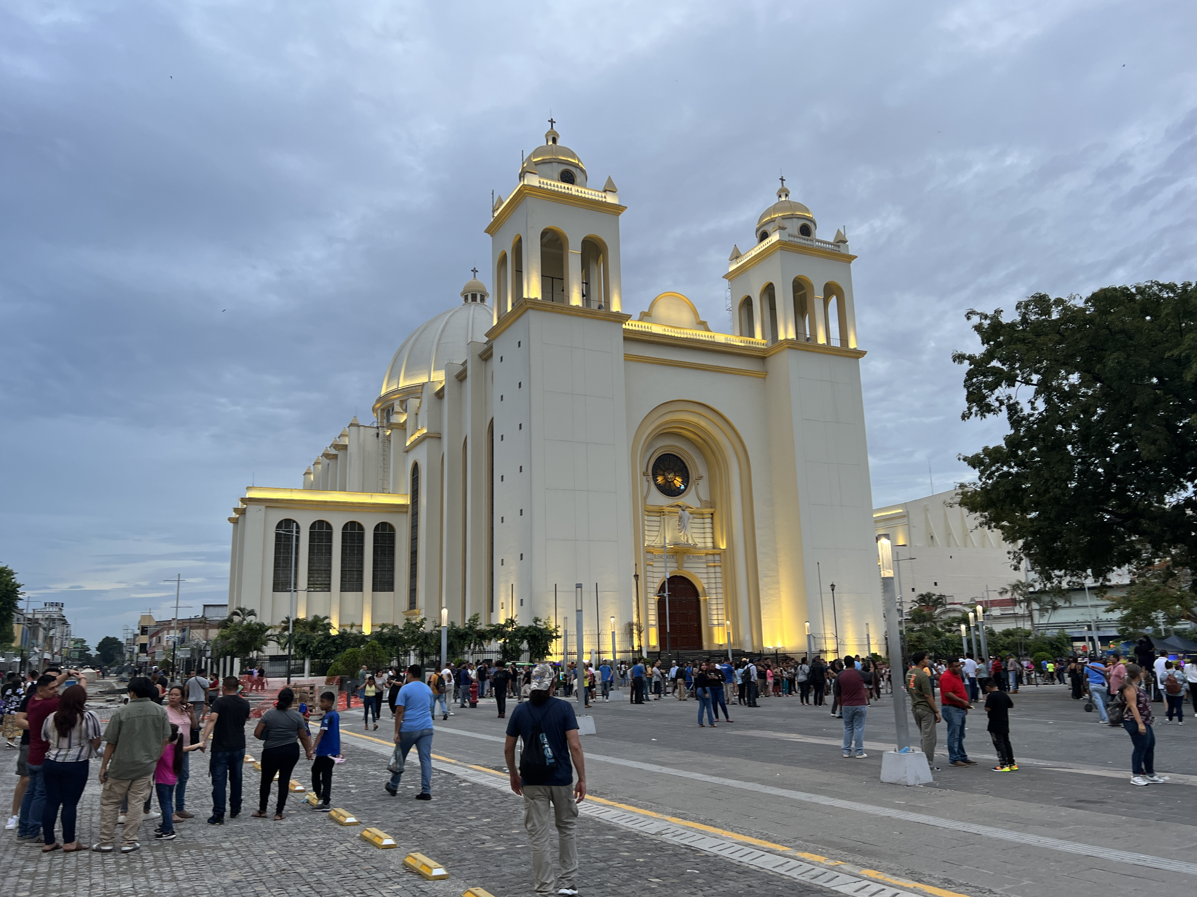
Metropolitan Cathedral of San Salvador, facing Plaza Barrios in the city center

The Metropolitan Cathedral of the Holy Savior (Catedral Metropolitana de San Salvador) is the principal church of the Roman Catholic Archdiocese of San Salvador and the seat of the Archbishop of San Salvador. The church was twice visited by Pope John Paul II, who said that the cathedral was "intimately allied with the joys and hopes of the Salvadoran people." During his visits in 1983 and 1996, the Pope knelt and prayed before the Tomb of Archbishop Óscar Romero, assassinated in 1980, whose tomb here is a major draw for pilgrims. The cathedral's site is the location of the old Temple of Santo Domingo (St. Dominic).

Forty four people died on Palm Sunday, 31 March 1980, during the funeral of Archbishop Romero, as a result of a stampede after some gunmen, allegedly members of security forces (although it has never been corroborated), fired on mourners and on Romero's funeral cortege. The gunmen were never identified. The square in front of the cathedral was the site of celebrations after the signing of the Chapultepec Peace Accords that ended the Salvadoran Civil War in 1992. The cathedral was finished off with a festive tiled ceramic mural façade by the Salvadoran master Fernando Llort and inaugurated on 19 March 1999. In late December 2012, the Archbishop of San Salvador, José Luis Escobar Alas, ordered the removal of the façade without consulting the national government or the artist himself. Workers chipped off and destroyed all the 2,700 tiles of the mural.

==== National Theater ====
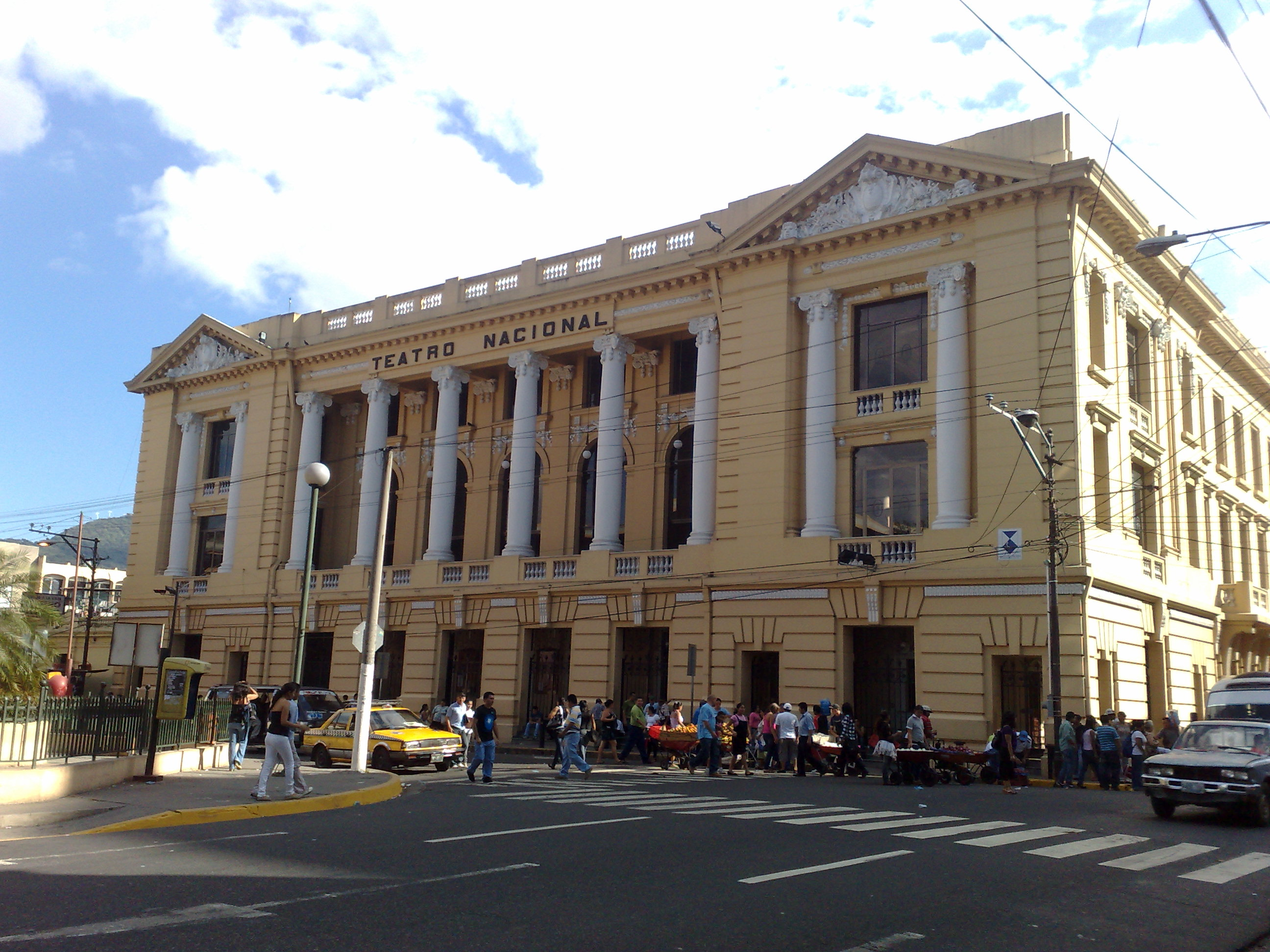
National Theater of El Salvador

The Teatro Nacional de El Salvador, or National Theater of El Salvador, is the oldest theater in Central America. It was designed by the French architect Daniel Beylard, with construction starting on 3 November 1911. The building was inaugurated on 1 March 1917. It is of French Renaissance style with modern touches, and was decorated by the Italian architect Lucio Cappellaro.

The National Theater is located on the southern side of Francisco Morazán Plaza on Calle Delgado. It was built in the French Renaissance style with details done in the Rococo, Romantic, and Art Nouveau styles, and can seat 650 spectators in the Grand Hall. It has balconies on three levels—the Presidential Balcony, located between the third and second Floor, has a direct view of center stage. The building features an ellipsoidal dome containing a mural by painter Carlos Cañas and a crystal chandelier; other impressive spaces include the Chamber Hall and the Grand Foyer. The theater is open to tourists, and after the Historic Downtown Restoration has been used for plays, shows, operas, song recitals, and modern dance performances. It is the largest and most luxurious theater in Central America, and was declared a National Monument in 1979.

==== Calle Arce ====
Calle Arce (named after Manuel José Arce, first president of the Federal Republic of Central America) is a major street in San Salvador. Mayor Norman Quijano inaugurated the first phase of its redevelopment near the Plaza de la Salud, which focuses on improvements to the sidewalks between 21st and 19th Avenida Norte. Twelve antique lights, originally from Spain and dating from 1900, will be installed, along with six benches and 40 trees.

At the same time, sidewalks will be renovated with ramps to provide access for people with disabilities and seniors. Calle Arce is monitored by 24 members of the Corps Metropolitan Agents (CAM), who specialize in the maintenance and protection of the new public space.

==== Parks and plazas ====
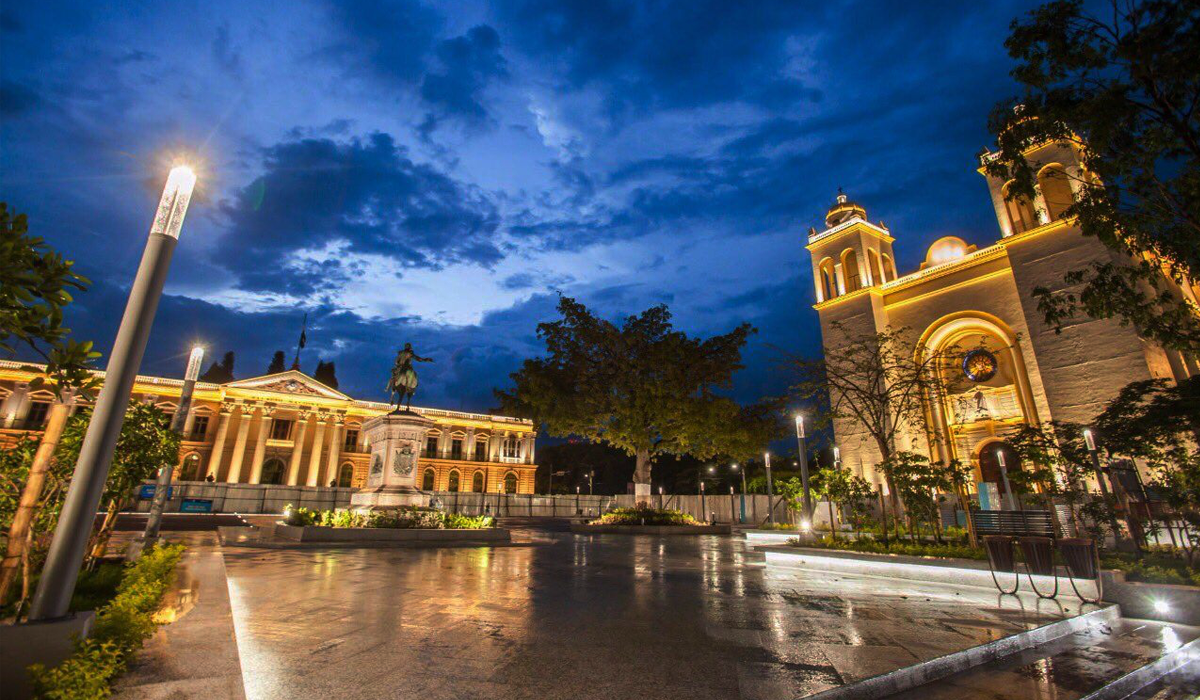
Plaza Gerardo Barrios

===== Plaza Gerardo Barrios =====
La Plaza Gerardo Barrios, also known as the Civic Plaza, is located in the heart of the city. The statue that dominates the site, designed by Francisco Durini Cáseres, is dedicated to President Gerardo Barrios and was unveiled in 1909. It was the work of the sculptors Antonio and Carlos Ezeta, who were brothers. The figure, made of bronze, is placed on a pedestal of granite and depicts battle scenes and the shield of El Salvador.

Plaza Gerardo Barrios is the site of many demonstrations and political rallies. Mass is celebrated there as well, and it is the destination of many parades. The plaza is also the focal point for celebrations accompanying the feast of San Salvador on 5 and 6 August. The religious procession called El Descenso ("The Descent"), dedicated to the Divine Savior of the World and representing the resurrection of Jesus and his descent from the tomb, terminates there.

===== Plaza Libertad =====
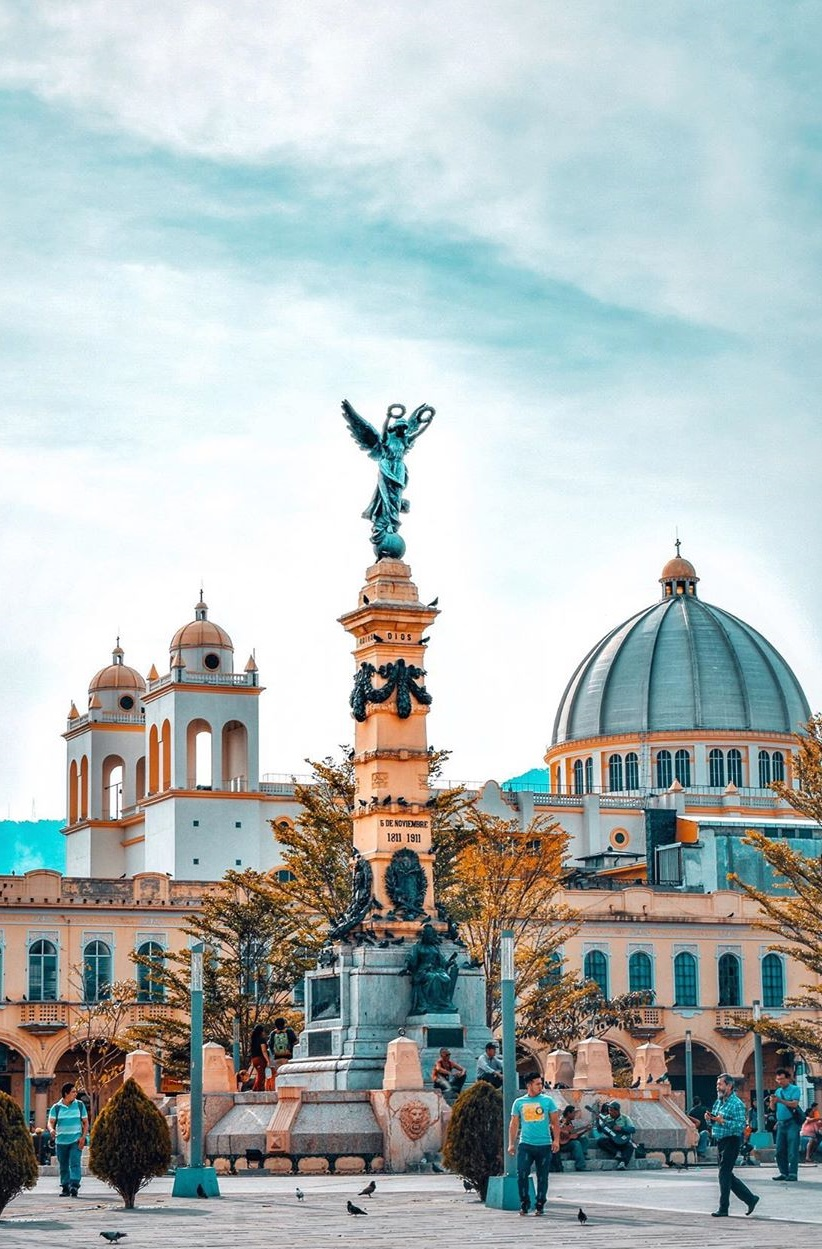
Plaza Libertad

Plaza Libertad is the location of the Monumento de los Héroes (Monument to the Heroes), a commemoration of the centenary of the "First Cry of Independence" in 1811. The monument, designed by Francisco Durini Cáseres, and installed in 1911, is crowned by an "angel of freedom" at its pinnacle holding a laurel wreath in both hands. As a consequence of increased commercial activity, the area around the plaza was enhanced with the construction of two ornate buildings, the Portal la Dalia in 1915–1916 and the Portal de Occidente in 1917.

===== Plaza Morazán =====
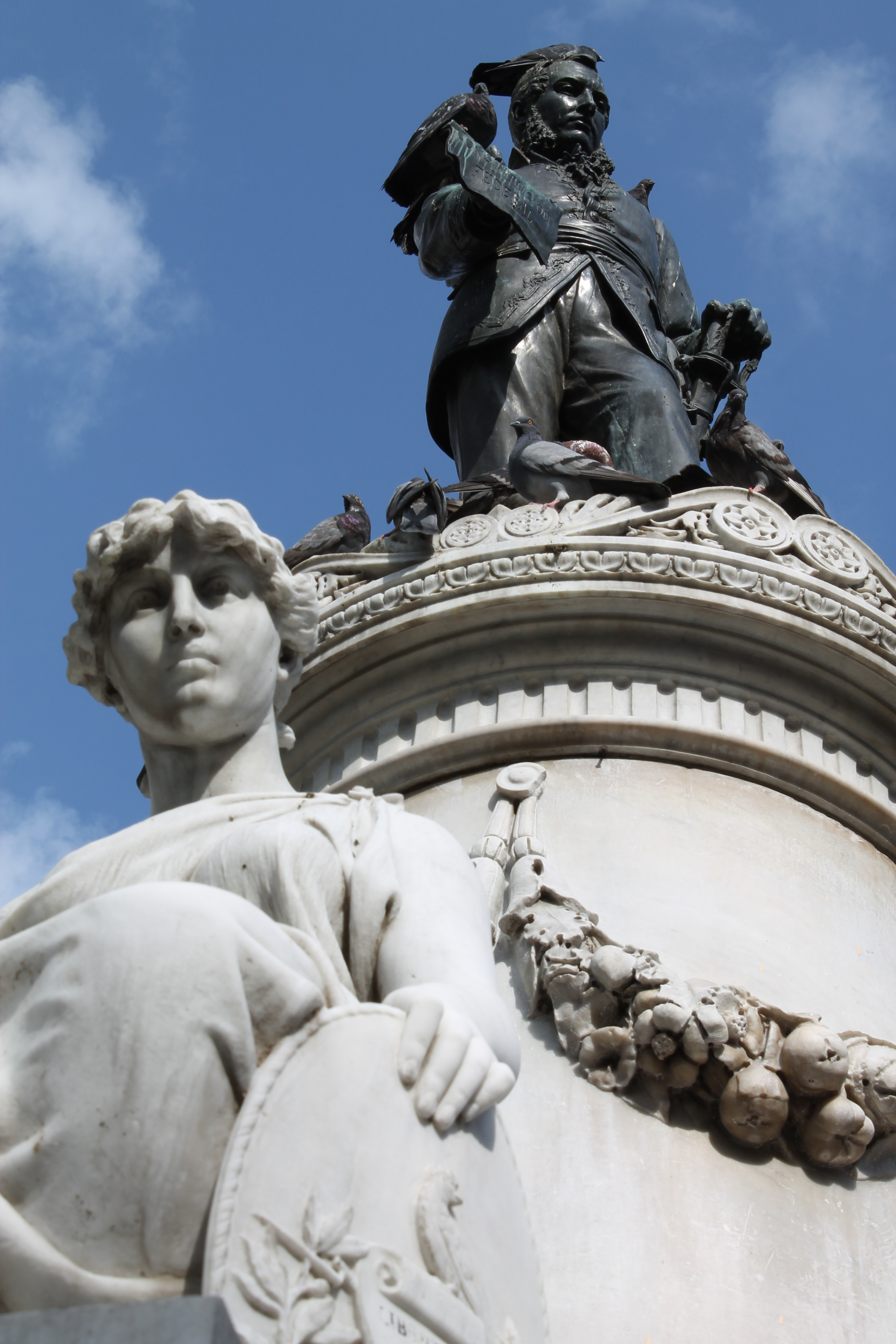
Plaza Gral. Francisco Morazán

During the administration of President Rafael Zaldivar, the Salvadoran government ordered the erection of a marble statue here to commemorate the fortieth anniversary (15 March 1882) of the death of Francisco Morazán, former president of the Federal Republic of Central America. The sculpture was created by the artist Francisco Durini Vasalli originally of Tremona, Italy. The government declared 15 March as a day of national civic celebration, and Morazan's son attended the inauguration as a representative of the Government of Honduras.

==== Casa Dueñas ====
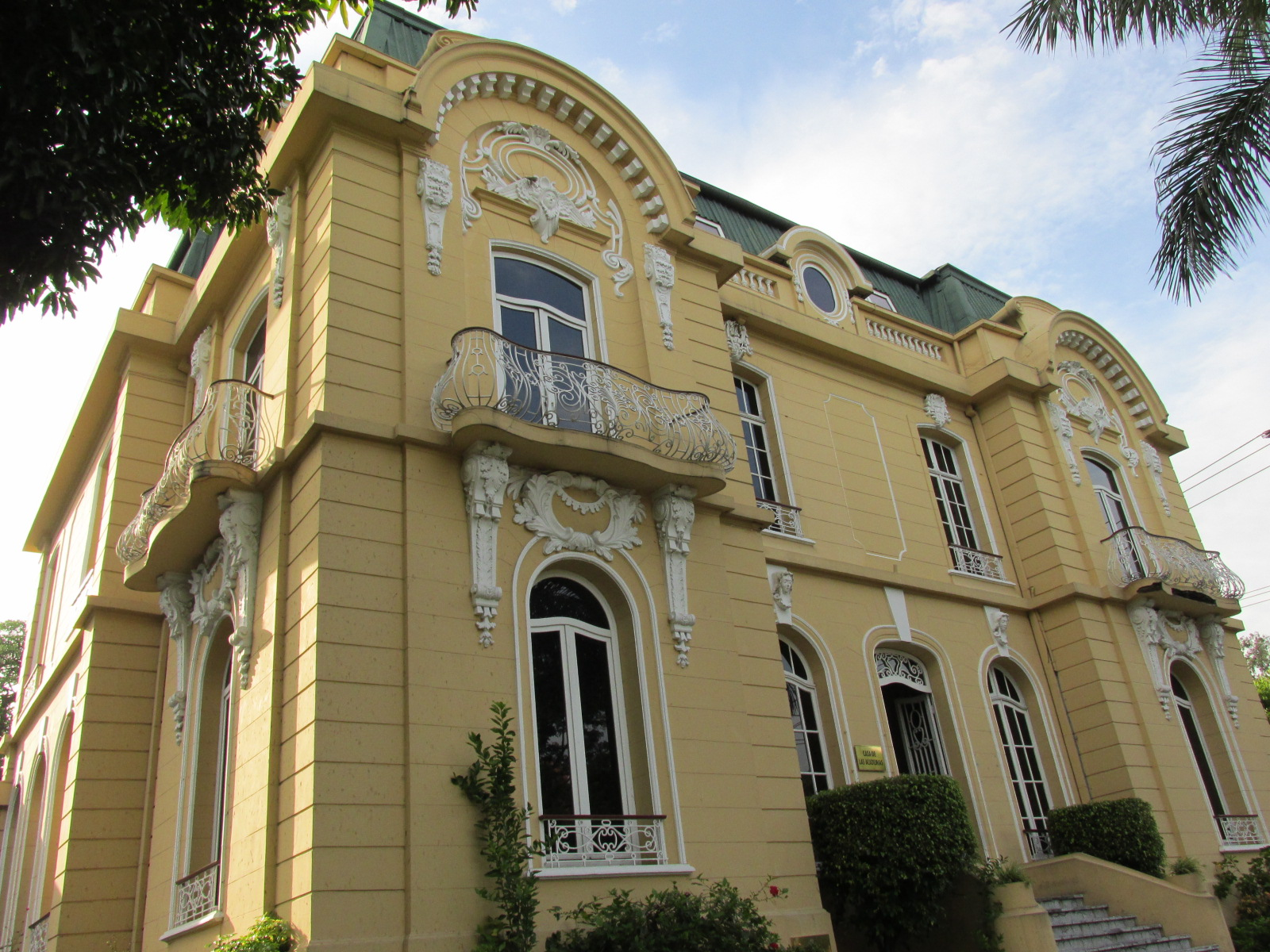
Casa Dueñas

This important residential building was built in the 1920s by coffee farmer Miguel Dueñas. The government confiscated the house in 1922 to cover the owner's debts, and it then remained unoccupied for years. From 1930 to 1933, Mexico leased the house for use by its diplomatic delegation, and from 1935 to 1957 the United States legation rented the house for its ambassadors' residence. Six successive U.S. ambassadors resided there, and occasional guests such as former Presidents Richard Nixon and Lyndon B. Johnson, Senator Robert Kennedy, and movie stars Clark Gable and Tony Curtis stayed there. After 1957 it was the temporary headquarters of an advertizing agency, then was vacated again in 1960. In 1973 the Department of Vocational Training Ministry of Labor occupied the structure; in 1986 it was declared a Cultural Asset by an Executive Agreement of 8 May 1985. The Ministry of Labor transferred the property to the authorities of the Ministry of Education, with a directive to explore the possibility of its restoration and rehabilitation. The restoration work began in 2001 under the leadership of Dr. Alfredo Martínez Moreno, former director of the Salvadorean Language Academy and the Royal Spanish Academy.

=== Museums ===
San Salvador has many museums, with the largest being the Museo Nacional de Antropología de El Salvador (MUNA) and Museo de Arte de El Salvador (MARTE). MUNA's mission is to help Salvadorans reflect on their cultural identity through exhibitions, research, publications and educational programs in the fields of archeology and anthropology. The museum's exhibits demonstrate social processes of the human cultural groups that have inhabited El Salvador. MARTE's mission is to contribute to development of the country's education and culture through the conservation and dissemination of its artistic heritage, and by improving historical knowledge, reaffirming cultural values that shape the Salvadoran identity, and promoting new artistic idioms. MARTE is a private, nonprofit organization, opened on 22 May 2003. Since then the museum has become an essential element of the cultural life of Central America, with its representative view of art from the mid-19th century to contemporary times.

A different sort of museum is the Tin Marín Museo de los Niños (Tin Marin Children's Museum), located between Gimnasio Nacional José Adolfo Pineda and Parque Cuscatlán. Tin Marín seeks to contribute to children becoming integral and creative citizens through significant learning, cultural stimulation and entertaining experimentation. The museum has more than 25 exhibits, including The Airplane, The Grocery Store, and the Planetarium.

=== Sports ===
Estadio Cuscatlán, with a capacity of over 45,000, is the largest soccer venue in Central America and the Caribbean. It was announced on 16 November 2007, that Estadio Cuscatlán would become the first soccer stadium in Central America and the Caribbean to have a large LED screen, on which spectators can view the action. The screen is 40 meters in height and width and was completed in March 2008. The stadium was built in the early 1970s just before the beginning of the civil war, intended to jump-start an era of modernization in San Salvador, but development in the country ground to a halt during the 12 years of war.

Another major stadium is the Estadio Jorge "Mágico" González, with a capacity of 35,000. This stadium hosted the Central American and Caribbean Games in 2002, in which El Salvador came in 6th place among 37 countries.

San Salvador is the home of three major soccer teams in the Primera División de Fútbol de El Salvador: Alianza F.C., C.D. Atlético Marte and C.D. Universidad de El Salvador. Alianza F.C. and Atlético Marte play their home games at Estadio Cuscatlán, and C.D. Universidad de El Salvador plays theirs at Estadio Universitario UES. Alianza is well known throughout El Salvador for its loyal supporters and for the exuberant atmosphere created during games.

In basketball, the city will host all matches for the 2027 FIBA Women's AmeriCup.

=== Major tourist attractions ===
- Catedral Metropolitana – Metropolitan Cathedral
- Teatro Nacional de El Salvador – The National Theatre of El Salvador
- Palacio Nacional – National Palace
- Monumento al Divino Salvador del Mundo – Monument to the Savior of the World
- Casa Presidencial – The Presidential Mansion
- Monumento a La Libertad – Monument to Liberty
- Estadio Cuscatlán – Soccer stadium
- Monumento a la Constitución – Constitution monument
- Plaza Alberto Masferrer
- Los Planes De Renderos – An attraction with many pupuserías, overlooking San Salvador.

== Education ==
San Salvador has numerous private high schools, including Protestant and Catholic high schools, as well as secular ones; the city also has numerous private bilingual schools.

== Transportation ==
San Salvador is a major regional transportation hub, served by a comprehensive public transport network. Major routes of the national transportation network run through the city.

=== Airport ===
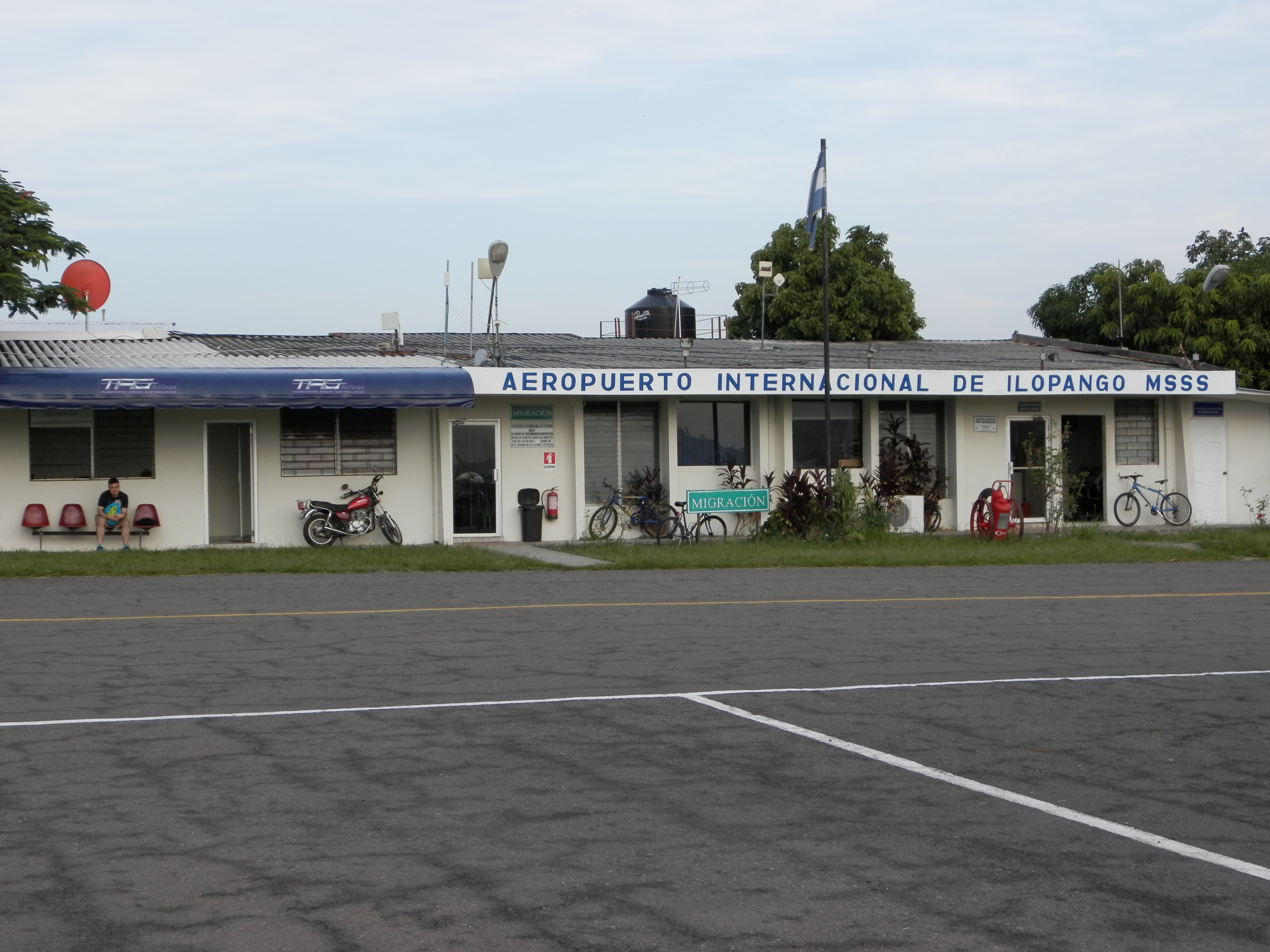
Ilopango International Airport

The country's primary airport is Monseñor Óscar Arnulfo Romero International Airport, which handles all international flights. It replaced Ilopango International Airport as the country's main airport on 31 January 1980. Ilopango airport is located within the city limits and could not be expanded due to the lack of land and the proximity of the surrounding population, so the new airport was built outside the city in the neighboring department of La Paz.

Monseñor Óscar Arnulfo Romero International Airport lies on flat terrain, and it is not surrounded by populated areas, so it can be expanded in the future. It is located in the municipality of San Luis Talpa, 40 km (25 miles) from San Salvador. In 2024 the airport registered 5,298,491 passengers, confirming its position as the third most important airport in Central America.

Ilopango International Airport is used for military and charter aviation. It recently underwent renovation, and re-opened in 2009. It holds the annual Ilopango Air Show and is home to the National Aviation Museum.

Tamarindo Regional: There are plans to rehabilitate the airport on the Eastern Salvadoran coast of El Tamarindo, La Unión.

=== Roads ===
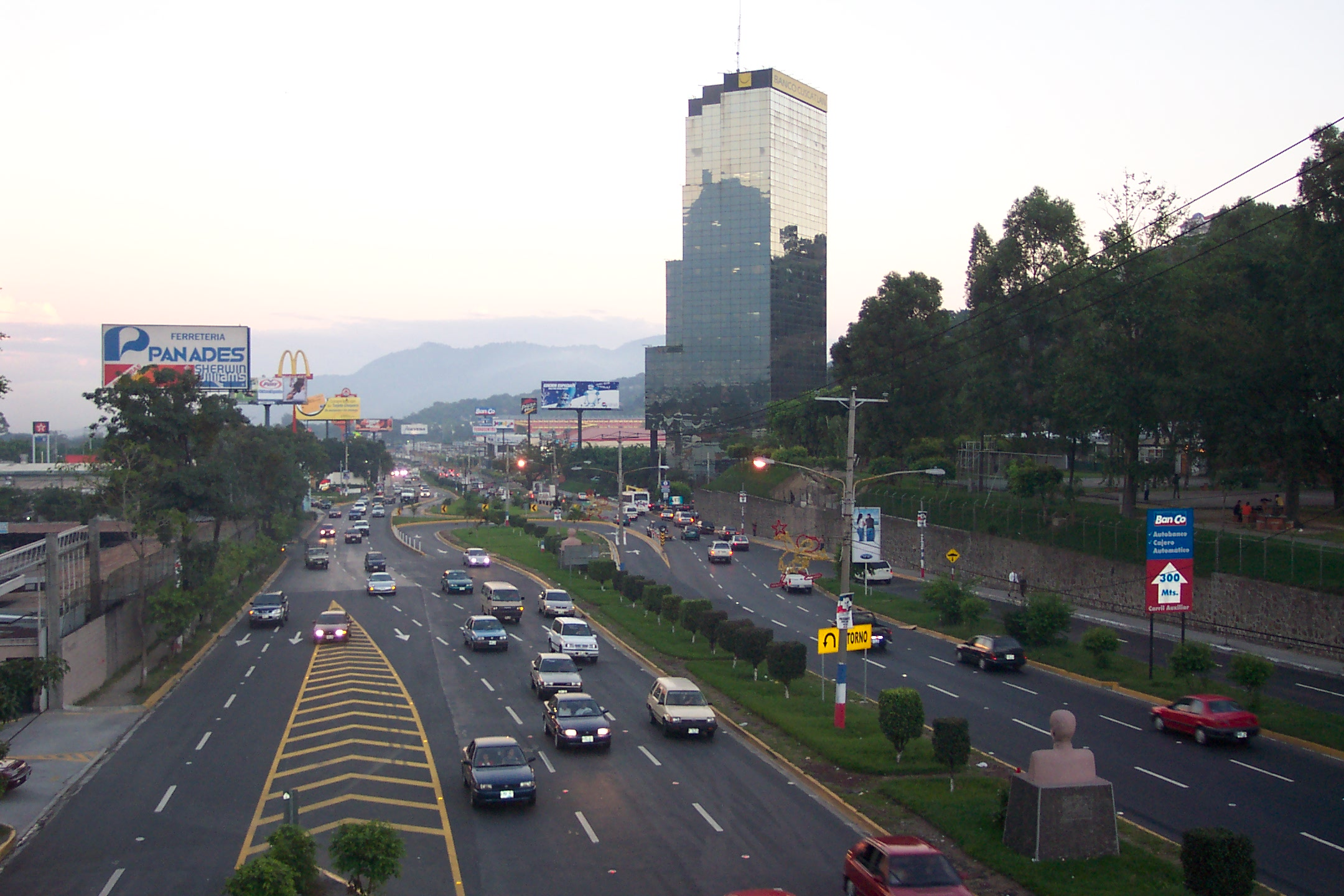
RN-5 Los Próceres East/West

The main highway passing through San Salvador is the CA-1 (Pan-American highway), which at one point becomes Bulevar Arturo Castellanos. The RN-21 (Bulevar Monseñor Romero) is a major east–west road connecting the cities of Santa Tecla and Antiguo Cuscatlán, finally merging in San Salvador with the RN-5 East/West (also known as Bulevar los Próceres), that later turns into the North/South RN-5 heading towards the International Airport. Another major roadway is the RN-4 (Carretera Este Oeste) which runs from San Salvador through Apopa, and subsequently merges with the CA-1 Panamericana.

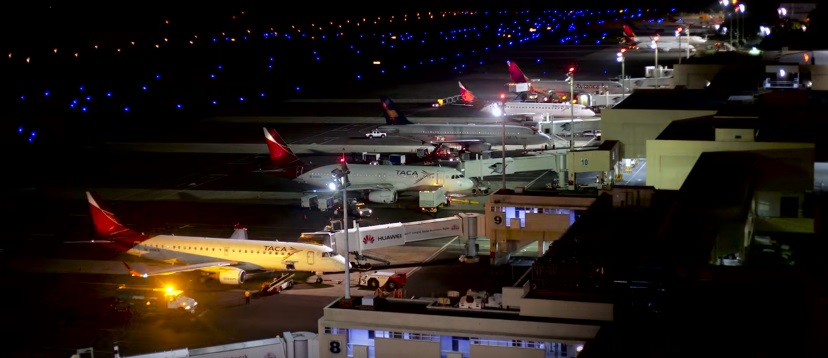
El Salvador International Airport

Roads in the capital are called "street" if they run east–west, and "avenue" if they run north–south. Road numbering starts at the downtown intersection of Avenida Espana/Avenida Cuscatlán and Delgado Arce street. Avenues to the west of this intersection have odd-number names, and to the east they have even-number names. Streets have odd-number names if they are to the north of the intersection, and even-number names if to the south.

One particularly heavily traveled road is 49a Avenida Norte, which connects with the RN-5 highway to the airport. An important historical street is Calle Arce, which was closed in order to create a pedestrian-only mall in the historic downtown of San Salvador. Some streets in the city are very narrow with little room for cars to pass, although many streets are wide. Speed limits are 90 km/h (56 mph) on highways, 60 km/h (37 mph) on main roads, and 40 km/h (25 mph) on secondary streets and avenues.

=== SITRAMSS ===
The San Salvador Metropolitan Area Integrated System of Transportation (SITRAMSS) was a high-volume bus transportation system. The first route of the SITRAMSS made round trips from San Martin, through Ilopango, Soyapango, San Salvador, and Antiguo Cuscatlan to Santa Tecla. Between 40 and 60 buses capable of carrying 160 passengers per trip were scheduled to start operating in the second half of 2013. The departure interval was approximately eight to ten minutes. By the time the buses have reached the San Salvador historic downtown, they had already transported 20,000 passengers. SITRAMSS was a public-private partnership involving the current passenger transport operators, who must purchase the buses. To pay for the infrastructure development, a loan of $50 million was provided by the Inter-American Development Bank (BID)

=== Bus and taxi ===
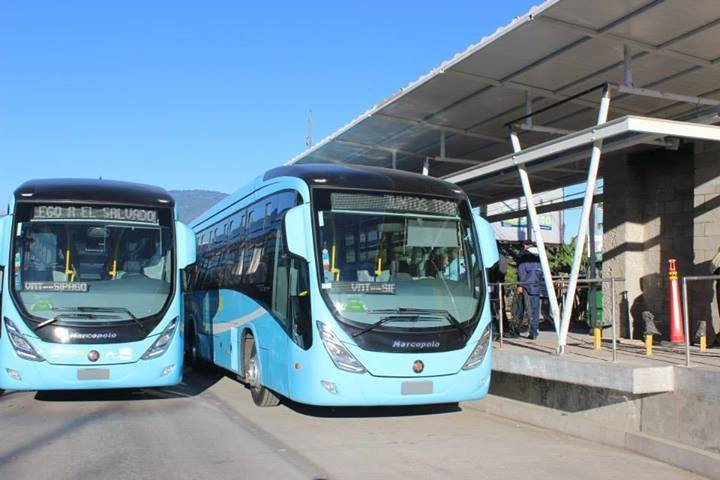
SITRAMSS bus system

Approximately 200,000 people use the city's public bus system daily. Some of the bus transportation system is operated by the city government, but most of it is operated by the private sector. This mixture of ownership has contributed to safety and traffic problems. In 2013, when the SITRAMS commenced operation, it was intended resolve many of these problems. Bus rides typically cost between $0.20 and $0.25, depending on the route. The city government operates a free bus system for use by handicapped, elderly, and pregnant women; this is the only such system in Central America.

A taxi system operates throughout the entire city; fares depend on the route, as taxi drivers charge based on the location of the destination, rather than on elapsed time. Taxis in San Salvador are yellow, and the fleet is composed primarily of Toyota Corollas.

=== Railway ===
Railway service was absent during the 1990s, but beginning on 1 October 2007, the National Railways of El Salvador (FENADESAL) resumed service. Tickets cost $0.10. Trains depart from near the East Bus Station and travel to the town of Apopa (service suspended from 2013). There are plans to start operation of another route, connecting the northern side of San Salvador, Cuscatancingo, to Apopa and from Apopa, to the city of Nejapa.

There is also a historic railroad consisting of railroad cars from the 1960s which were refurbished and put into operation by the ministry of tourism. Once a month, visitors can board the antique train and experience the way San Salvadorans transported themselves in the 1960s.

== Disasters ==
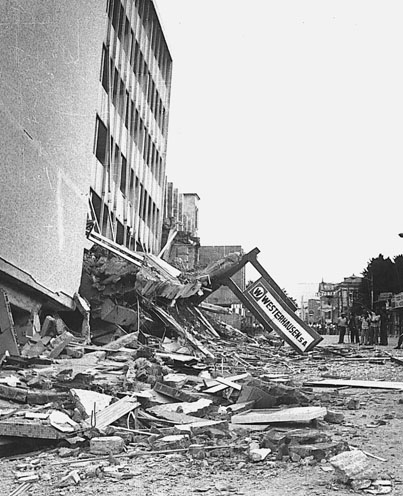
The Gran Hotel

The city has suffered from many severe earthquakes, the most disastrous of which occurred in 1854. The San Salvador volcano erupted again in 1917, resulting in three major earthquakes that damaged the city so extensively the government was forced to temporarily move the capital to the city of Santa Tecla (known at the time as Nueva San Salvador). The 1986 San Salvador earthquake struck on 10 October 1986, causing considerable damage to the city and surrounding areas. Between 1,000 and 1,500 people are believed to have been killed, and over 10,000 people were injured. 200,000 people were left homeless after the earthquake and a week of minor aftershocks.

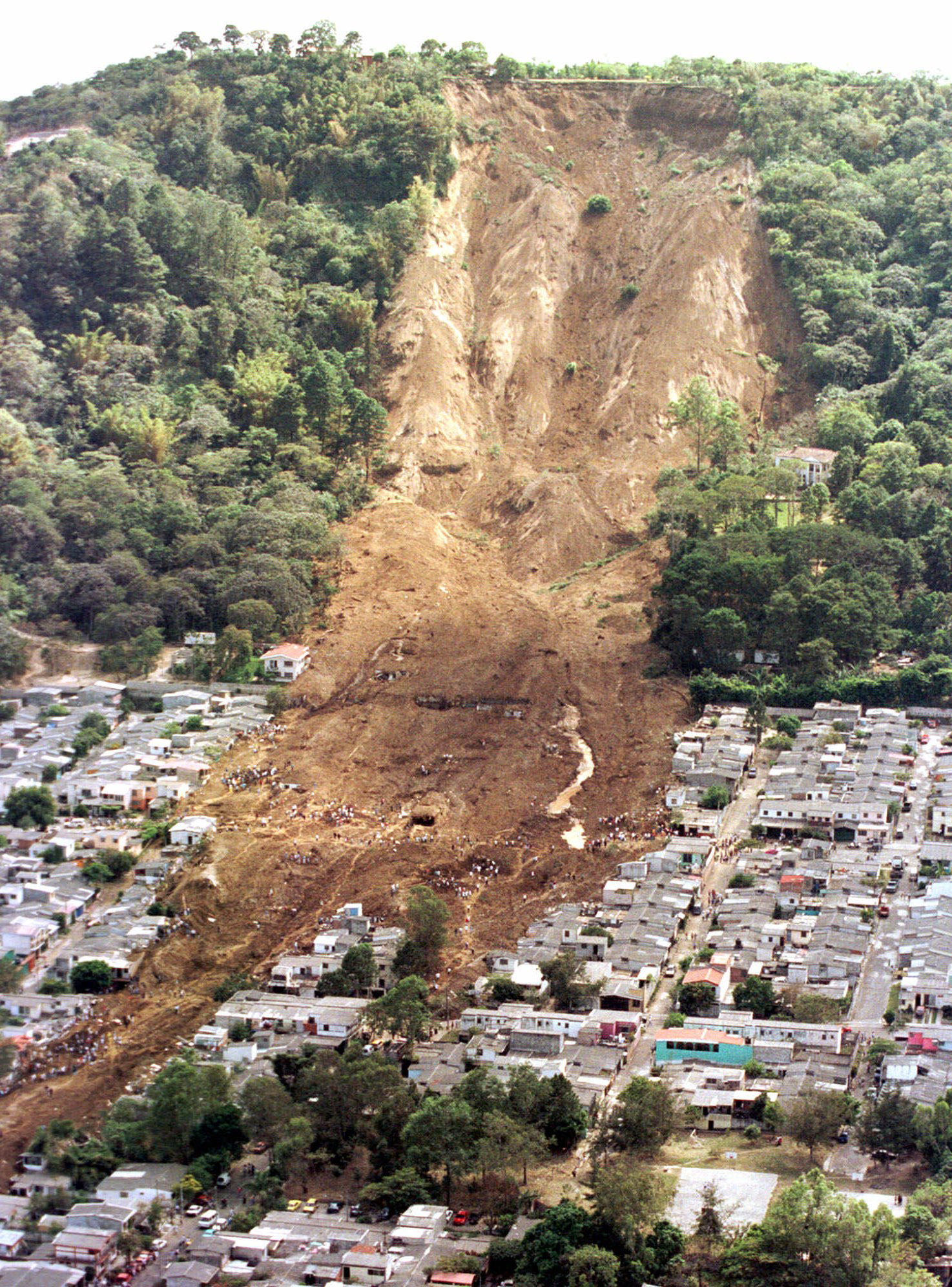
landslide caused by the 2001 earthquake

The 2001 El Salvador earthquakes struck El Salvador on 13 January and 13 February, 2001, resulting in considerable damage to the city, especially in Las Colinas suburb, where a landslide destroyed homes and killed many people.

During the 1980s, when political conflicts in El Salvador exploded into Salvadoran civil war, many people fled to the capital, since most of the fighting occurred elsewhere (San Salvador itself was not directly affected by the war until the final offensive of 1989).

Hurricanes, tsunamis, and landslides also pose a threat. In November 2009, Hurricane Ida hit the departments of San Salvador, San Vicente and Cuscatlán. In San Vicente, the municipalities of Verapaz and Guadalupe were totally destroyed by rainfall accompanying the hurricane, and the resultant landslide. The Army and the Red Cross were able to rescue most of the victims, but many thousands of people were left homeless. The government opened public schools to be used as temporary shelters for three months. The Hurricane destroyed some bridges, and some towns lost communications. The people of El Salvador raised money for the homeless and international aid came from countries such as the United States, Mexico, Nicaragua, Guatemala, and the European Union.

=== Tropical Storm Agatha ===
Tropical storm Agatha hit the Central American coast on Thursday, 27 May 2010. About 3 feet (0.91 m) of rainfall was recorded over a period of five days in the Metropolitan Area of San Salvador, producing sinkholes, flash floods, and mudslides. Districts particularly hard hit included downtown, El Picacho, and Montebello.

=== Tropical Storm Amanda ===
Tropical storm Amanda caused torrential rainfall across El Salvador, which was heavily impacted by the storm. In El Salvador, torrential rainfall caused significant damage along coastal cities in the country as rivers overflowed and swept away buildings. In San Salvador, 50 houses were destroyed and 23 vehicles fell into a sinkhole. Rivers overflowed and swept away buildings, damaging 900 homes and displacing over 1,200 people. Movement restrictions in place for the then-ongoing COVID-19 pandemic in El Salvador were temporarily lifted to allow people to purchase medicines, while hardware stores were allowed to open with limited capacity so people could purchase equipment for repairs. President Nayib Bukele declared a 15-day national state of emergency due to the storm. Amanda was considered the worst weather disaster to effect El Salvador in 22 years, since Hurricane Mitch. Amanda caused rainfall accumulations of at least 600 mm (24 in) in many parts of the country, while Mitch only caused at least 400 mm (16 in) in other areas over a longer period of time.

== Security and crime ==
Concerns about public safety in San Salvador increased in the late 1980s due to the civil war. Although it was fought primarily in the countryside, during the latter years of the war, guerrillas started attacking the capital city. San Salvador recovered quickly after the cessation of hostilities, but gang ("mara") violence became a problem.

The 18th Street gang, originating in Los Angeles, California, United States, has proliferated in San Salvador. The Mara Salvatrucha is a rival gang. In 2002 crime rates skyrocketed and the municipal government was unable to combat the rise. Recent efforts by mayor Norman Quijano to restore public safety have been somewhat successful. Security measures in San Salvador's most troubled Districts (5 and 6, which border Soyapango, and are home to many gangs) included safety campaigns and recreational activities to keep youth from joining gangs. The mayor also initiated a security camera program so the police can monitor the most heavily trafficked areas of the city. The project was launched in the historic downtown and will expand throughout the entire city.

As of 2011 San Salvador had managed to reduce its crime rate, and reduce its murder rate to a level lower than that of Haiti, Venezuela, Mexico, Guatemala, or Honduras, although at over 90 murders per 100,000 residents, the per capita rate was more than 10 times higher than major cities such as New York or London. Also according to a UN Development report, San Salvador has a relatively low robbery rate of 90 per 100,000, compared to San José, the capital of Costa Rica, which has 524 robberies per 100,000.

== Notable people ==
- Arturo Ambrogi, writer and journalist
- Maribel Arrieta, Miss El Salvador 1955
- María de Baratta (1890–1978), composer, pianist, musicologist, and folklorist
- Armando Bukele Kattán, businessman
- Nayib Bukele, president of El Salvador
- Alfredo Cristiani, former president of El Salvador
- Armando Calderón Sol, former president of El Salvador
- Carlos Calleja, businessman and CEO of Grupo Calleja, owner of largest supermarket chain in El Salvador
- Roque Dalton, poet and journalist
- Fernanfloo, YouTuber
- Kilmar Abrego Garcia, political prisoner
- Giovanni Gil, plastic artist
- José Gustavo Guerrero, diplomat
- Carlos Irigoyen Ruiz, musician
- Bernard Lewinsky, physician and father of Monica Lewinsky
- Fernando Llort, artist
- Milena Mayorga, ambassador and former model
- Alicia Nash, activist
- Ariane de Rothschild, CEO of Edmond de Rothschild Group
- Elena Tedesco Bardi, beauty queen
- Adela Van Severen, politician

== Twin towns – sister cities ==
San Salvador is twinned with:

- Doha, Qatar
- Dubai, United Arab Emirates
- Guadalajara, Mexico
- Laval, Canada
- Lima, Peru
- Los Angeles, United States
- Madrid, Spain
- Monterrey, Mexico
- Panama City, Panama
- Seville, Spain
- Taipei, Taiwan
- Washington, D.C., United States

== See also ==
- Antiguo Cuscatlán
- Concepción de Ataco
- San Salvador (volcano)
- Santa Tecla
- Soyapango
- Zacatecoluca
