= La Capilla 515 =

Coordinates: 13°41′10.8″N 89°14′36.3″W

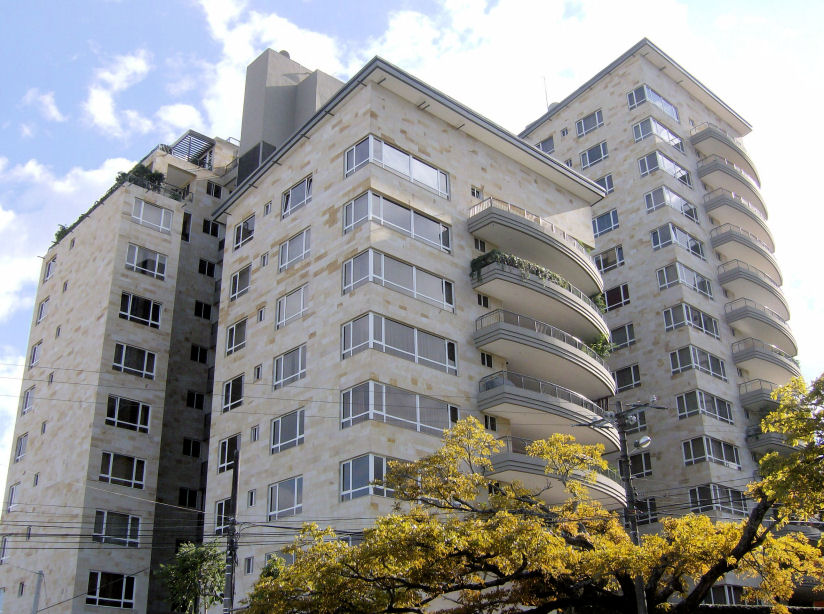

La Capilla 515 is an apartment complex in San Benito, San Salvador. It is one of the tallest apartment structures in the country. The building was constructed by Inversiones Bolivar, a Salvadoran construction and architecture company.

== Information ==
- Location: Avenida La Capilla, San Salvador
- Floor Count: 16 & 12
- Estimated Height: 64m/209 ft & 48m/157 ft
- Start Date: Mid-2004
- Completed Date: Early 2006
- Facilities: Gym, Green Areas, Pool, Parking, Country Club.
