= Torre El Pedregal =

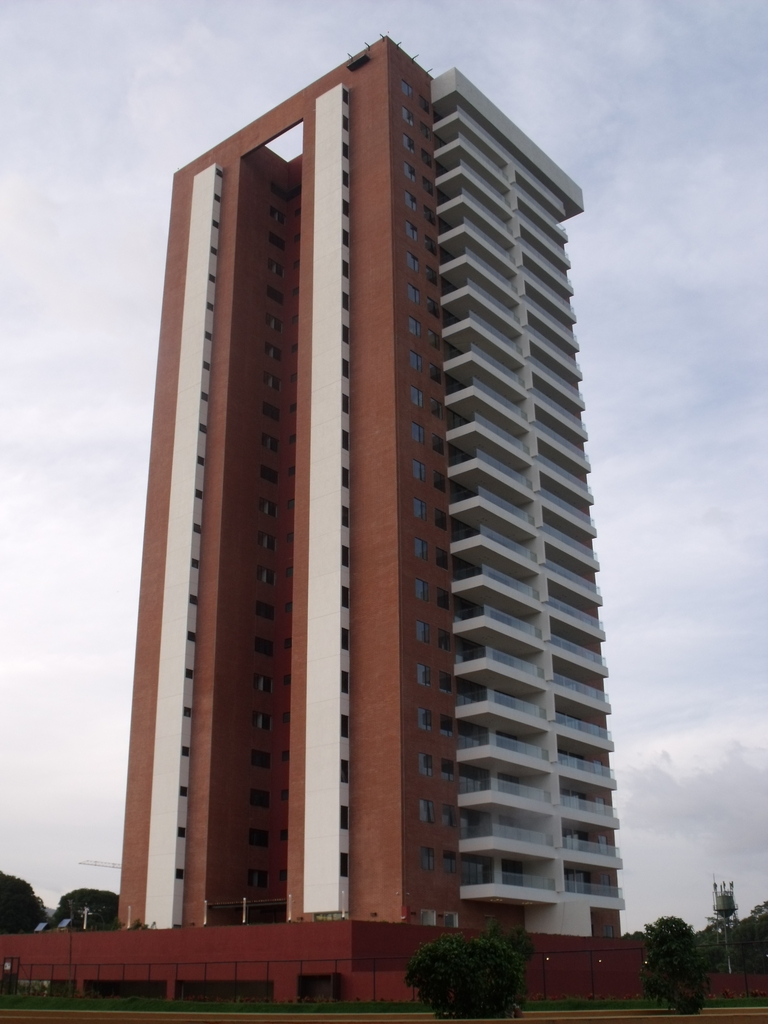

- Location within El Salvador
- Alternative names: Torres Multiplaza - Torre 1

Record height
- Tallest in El Salvador from 2009 to 2022^{[I]}
- Preceded by: Torre Futura
- Surpassed by: Torre Millennium

General information
- Status: Completed
- Type: Skyscraper
- Architectural style: Modernism
- Classification: Condominiums
- Location: Antiguo Cuscatlan, Calle El Pedregal, Antiguo Cuscatlán, El Salvador
- Coordinates: 13°40′49.5″N 89°14′49.4″W
- Construction started: 2007
- Completed: 2009
- Opened: 2010
- Cost: $34,500,000

Height
- Architectural: 361.9 feet (110.3 m)
- Tip: 361.9 feet (110.3 m)
- Roof: 361.9 feet (110.3 m)

Technical details
- Material: Brick; Glass; Limestone; Reinforced Concrete; Steel; Terra cotta
- Floor count: 28 (25 above and 3 below)

Design and construction
- Architect: Ricardo Legorreta
- Architecture firm: Legorreta + Legorreta
- Developer: Grupo Lobre
- Other designers: Castaneda Ingenieros S.A de C.V.
- Main contractor: Grupo Roble

Other information
- Parking: 220-space underground parking garage

Torre El Pedregal is the second tallest building in El Salvador by Mexican architect Ricardo Legorreta, located in Antiguo Cuscatlan. It was built by Grupo Roble. It is 28 stories or 361.9 feet (110.3 m) tall and it is found in Antiguo Cuscatlán.

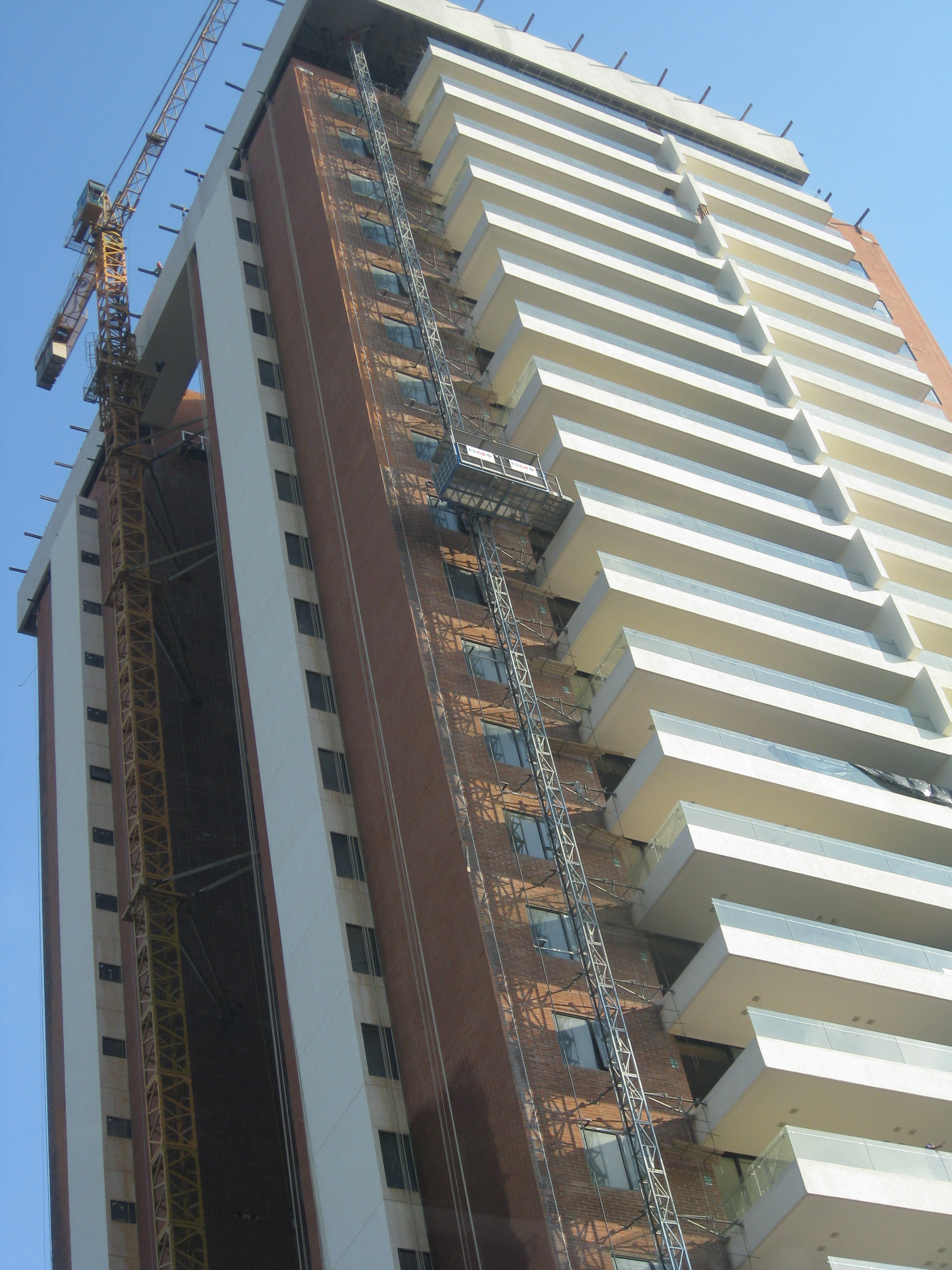
Torre El Pedregal visible from ground

The construction of urban developments is leading San Salvador to become a modern city. The building was a project f Roble Investment Group, which also built the shopping mall Multiplaza, across the street. The building has 28 levels and a height of 361.9 feet (110.3 m) and upon its completion it became the tallest in the country and even in Central America (except for Panama). The project was built in one of the most important commercial areas of the city. "El Pedregal is aimed at people who want to live in a safe and enjoyable environment", said Alberto Poma, general manager of Roble Group. The tower is part of a multipurpose project to be developed in phases on a total area of seven blocks (excluding the area of Multiplaza). The plan of the project included a five-star hotel, office buildings, apartments, and the existing mall.

== See also ==
- List of tallest buildings in Central America
