= German School of San Salvador =

Location
- El Salvador
- Coordinates: 13°40′48″N 89°14′18″W

Information
- Type: Private
- Established: 1965
- Grades: K-12

The German School of San Salvador (Spanish: Escuela Alemana de San Salvador; German: Deutsche Schule San Salvador) is a K-12 private institution in Antiguo Cuscatlán, El Salvador, in the San Salvador metropolitan area. The school stands out in their PAES scores, being among the top ranked schools in the country.

== History ==
In 1958, the German Embassy in El Salvador founded the "Círculo Cultural Salvadoreño-Alemán" (German-Salvadoran Cultural Association), with the view to enhance the cultural exchange between Germany and El Salvador. When Dr. Gerd Jaspersen took the leadership of the Círculo Cultural in 1963, he envisioned a German School on Salvadoran soil. After securing funding from Germany for its establishment, the school was inaugurated on March 3, 1965, by the then president of El Salvador, Julio Adalberto Rivera Carballo. The first campus of the German school was located in the Zona Rosa district of San Salvador, on a rented house. The school's first director, Mr. Julius Diesenberg, was sent from Germany.

In 1967 the school moved to its second campus, in the Flor Blanca district of San Salvador, again on a rented house adapted for school use. As the school was growing, the German School separated from the Círculo Cultural in 1968, and was now governed by a newly created "Asociación Escolar Alemana" (German School Association), which had the exclusive purpose of overseeing the school operations and manage its infrastructure. Around this time, Mr. Diesenberg finished his work in El Salvador and returned to Germany; Hannes Ihrig, a known Nazi who had been distributing Nazi propaganda and attempted to establish Hitler Youth through the German School in Costa Rica, arrived from Germany to take his place.

As the school continued to grow, the Asociación Escolar Alemana drafted plans to build a new campus for the German School. New lands were donated to the school by the Deininger family in 1970, a wealthy German-Salvadoran family with strong ties to the municipality of Antiguo Cuscatlán. The architectural design of the new campus was done by Austrian-Salvadoran architect Ehrentraut Katstaller. The first phase of the construction of the new campus in Antiguo Cuscatlán took place between 1970 and 1972, with financial support from Germany.

In 1972, the school officially moved to its third and current campus in Antiguo Cuscatlán. The main core buildings were finished, but further expansion was eventually required, so the Asociación Escolar Alemana bought adjacent land as constructions continued. As the school's first students entered middle school, the Governments of Germany and El Salvador signed a bilateral cultural convention, in which they agreed to enhance pedagogic collaboration between both countries, as well as continuing the economic support for the German School.

As the curriculum was fully bilingual (Spanish/German), local students could enroll at the school only if they possessed the necessary German skills appropriate for their school grade. In 1975, a "lateral entry" was established, in which local students interested in joining the German School in middle school could enroll in an intensive extracurricular German course, after which they would be eligible to enter the school.

In 1978, the construction of the main campus was completed, as the first generation of students graduate from high school.

== The school and Germany ==
Though it is a private institution, the school is financially supported by Germany. The government sends faculty from Germany and other countries. In 2006 the German government built the largest solar energy system in Latin America on top of the school's Kindergarten roof.

== Student Exchange with Germany ==
Since 1995, the German School organizes student exchanges between Germany and El Salvador. Students travel to Germany, are hosted by a local German family, and are required to attend classes at the local German high school. This short-term exchange enhances the learning of German, as well as the appreciation of German culture
