= Multiplaza =

Shopping Mall Chain

Coordinates: 13.6793°N 89.2487°W

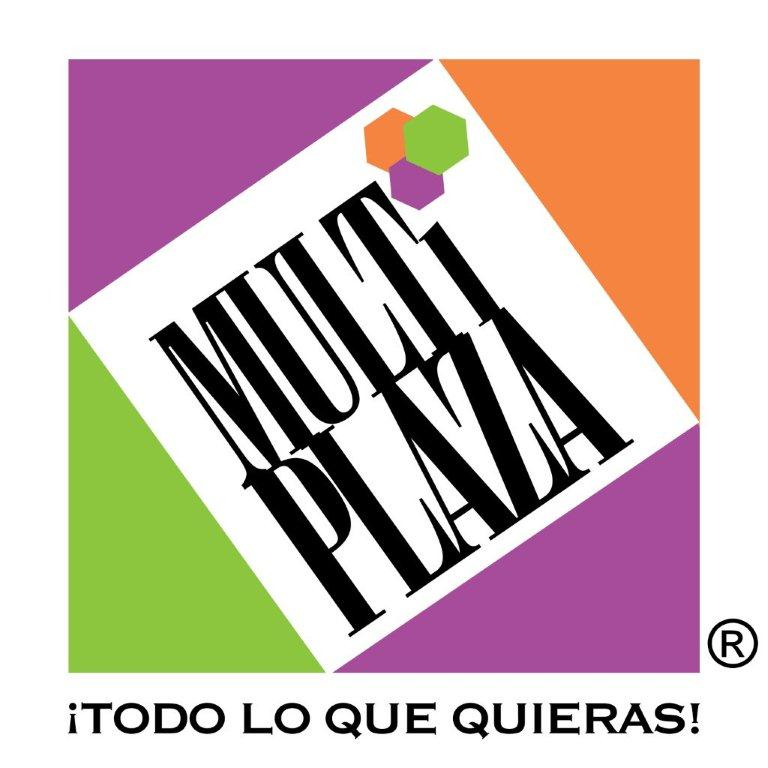
- Industry: Commercial real estate
- Founded: 1990
- Headquarters: El Salvador
- Products: Shopping malls
- Parent: Grupo Roble (Grupo Poma)
- Website: www.multiplaza.com

Multiplaza is a chain of shopping malls, owned by Grupo Roble of El Salvador (the real estate subsidiary of Grupo Poma), in Central America.

== Background ==
The first Multiplaza mall opened in Tegucigalpa, Honduras in 1990 as part of the expansion plan Grupo Roble. Additional Multiplaza locations opened in San Pedro Sula, Honduras, in 1995, Costa Rica (in Escazú in 1993), and Panama (in Panama City in 2004). After several years, Grupo Roble decided to create another chain of malls similar to Metrocentro CC.

The most ambitious project of Grupo Roble, a city within a city, was built (in the first phase) in 2004 Panamericana Multiplaza located in San Salvador, El Salvador, which has the commercial centers and a tower of luxury apartments. Multiplaza Panamericana is the biggest Multiplaza, and it will also hold the two tallest buildings in Central America (excluding Panama). These buildings are El Pedregal each one with the height of 106 m (348 ft) and 28 floors.

In 2009, the Multiplaza Panamá, designed by Ricardo Legorreta, was awarded the gold medal in the category Development and Design by the International Council of Shopping Centers.

The first H&M store to open in Panama was in September 2021 at a Multiplaza mall.

== Locations ==
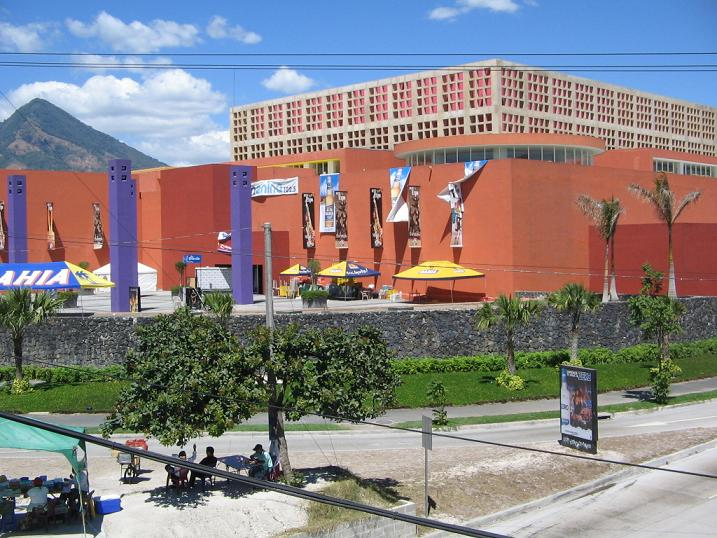
Panamericana Multiplaza mall in San Salvador.

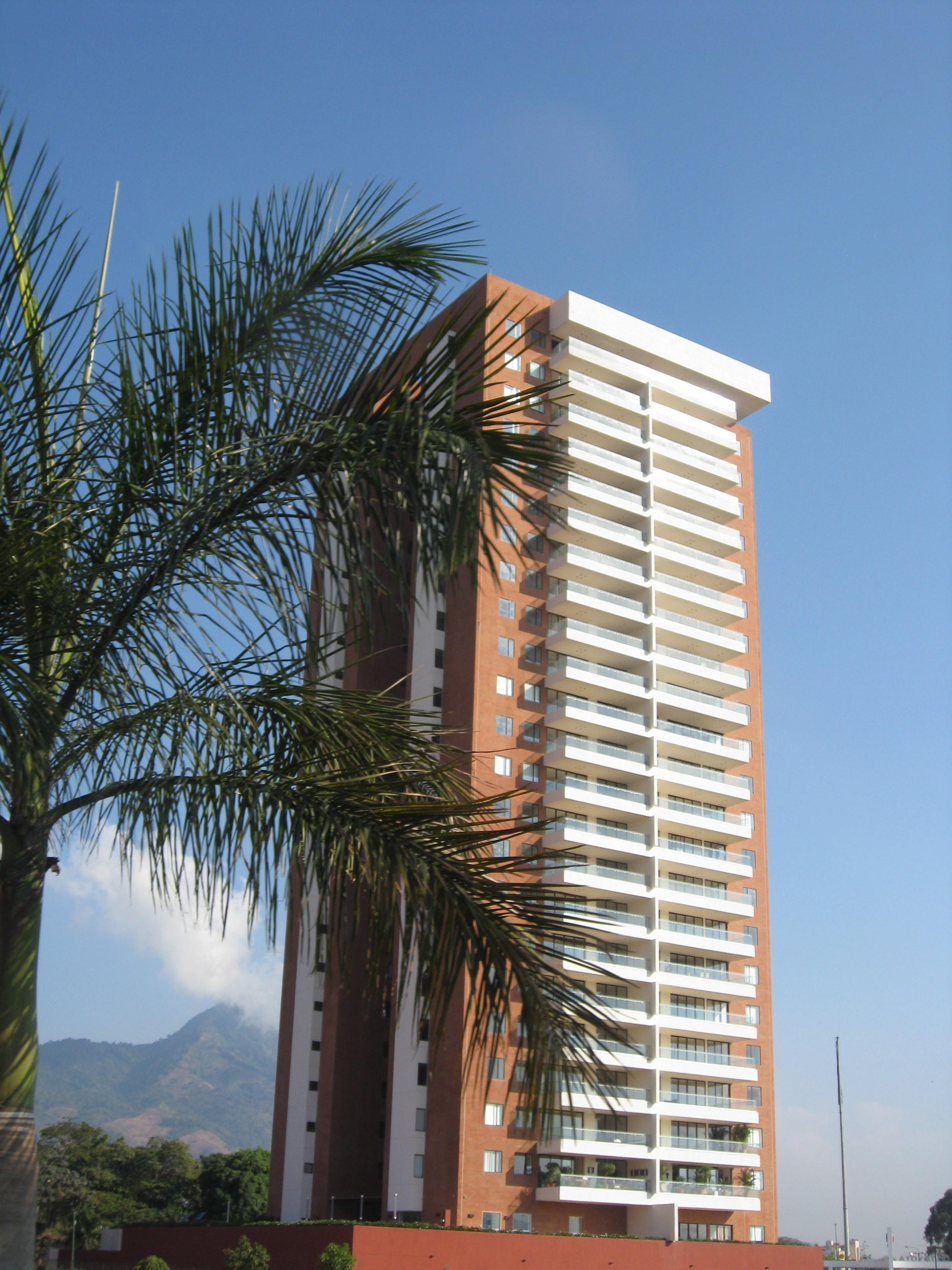
Torre El Pedregal, part of the Multiplaza complex in San Salvador.

Name	Country	City
Multiplaza Panamericana	El Salvador	Antiguo Cuscatlán
Multiplaza Escazú	Costa Rica	Escazú
Multiplaza Curridabat	Costa Rica	Curridabat
Multiplaza Pacific	Panama	Panama City
Multiplaza Eusebio Ayala	Paraguay	Asunción
Multiplaza Bosques	Mexico	Mexico City
Multiplaza Lindavista	Mexico	Monterrey
Multiplaza Ojo de Agua	Mexico	Ojo de Agua/Coacalco/Ecatepec
Multiplaza Arboledas	Mexico	Tlalnepantla de Baz
Multiplaza Estadio	Dominican Republic	La Romana
Multiplaza Hermanos Trejo	Dominican Republic	Higüey
Multiplaza El Paraíso	Venezuela	Caracas
Multiplaza Tegucigalpa	Honduras	Tegucigalpa
Multiplaza San Pedro Sula	Honduras	San Pedro Sula
Multiplaza Gran Akí	Ecuador	Ambato
Multiplaza Lizarzaburo	Ecuador	Riobamba
Multiplaza de las Esmeraldas	Ecuador	Esmeraldas
Multiplaza 5 de Junio	Ecuador	Portoviejo
Multiplaza Miraflores	Ecuador	Cuenca
Multiplaza La Felicidad	Colombia	Bogotá
Multiplaza Alamedas 2	Colombia	Montería
Multiplaza Guatemala	Guatemala	
