= Grupo Poma =

El Salvadoran business conglomerate

- Company type: Private company
- Industry: Conglomerate
- Founded: 1919
- Headquarters: San Salvador, El Salvador
- Key people: Fernando Poma (President)
- Products: Automotive, Real estate, Hotels, Telecommunications
- Divisions: Excel Automotriz, Grupo Roble, Real Hotels & Resorts, Grupo Solaire, Autofácil, Multiplaza
- Website: grupopoma.com

Grupo Poma is a family-owned conglomerate based in El Salvador. It is considered one of the 50 largest companies in the Central American region. The group is currently led by Fernando Poma. Its business activities include automobile dealerships, real estate development, industrial manufacturing, and hotels, as well as investments in telecommunications and various non-profit organizations.

== History ==
=== Early years ===
The company was founded in 1915 by Bartolomé Poma, a Spanish entrepreneur who arrived in El Salvador and established an automotive transport company. By 1918, he obtained the representation for Hudson and Essex vehicles. Despite a major fire in the company's early years, it rebuilt a new garage in 1920.

The firm survived significant challenges, including the Great Depression and World War II, the latter of which forced a temporary closure in 1943 due to a lack of imported vehicles. Over the following decades, the group diversified into the hotel and real estate sectors.

The group also developed internal capabilities in financing and risk management through its Autofácil division, which provides automotive credit in markets with low banking penetration across the region.

=== Consolidation and present day ===
Currently, Grupo Poma operates in nine countries across the Americas. In 2025, Fernando Poma assumed the presidency of the conglomerate.

== Group divisions ==
The conglomerate is organized into six primary divisions:

- Excel Automotriz: The largest automotive distributor in Central America, representing brands such as Toyota, BMW, Mitsubishi, and Chevrolet.
- Grupo Roble: Dedicated to the construction and management of shopping centers and office spaces.
- Real Hotels & Resorts: Operates chains including InterContinental, Marriott, and Choice Hotels.
- Grupo Solaire: Focuses on industrial manufacturing of architectural aluminum and glass.
- Autofácil: The financial division specialized in automotive loans.
- Multiplaza: A chain of high-end shopping malls with operations in El Salvador, Honduras, Panama, Costa Rica, and Colombia.

== Philanthropy ==
The group supports social initiatives through several organizations, including the Fundación Poma, the Escuela Superior de Economía y Negocios (ESEN), and the Fundación Renacer, which focuses on helping youth in the foster care system transition to professional life.
