= PAES =

University admission test in Chile

Prueba de Acceso a la Educación Superior
- Acronym: PAES
- Type: Paper-based standardized test
- Administrator: DEMRE, Undersecretary of Higher Education
- Skills tested: Reading comprehension in the Spanish language; Mathematics; Chemistry; Physics; Biology; History (National and World)
- Purpose: Higher Education Access
- Year started: 2022
- Score range: 100–1000
- Regions: Chile
- Languages: Spanish

The Higher Education Access Test (Spanish: Prueba de Acceso a la Educación Superior), often shortened as its Spanish acronym PAES, is a nationwide standardized test used as part of the university admission system of Chile. In effect since 2022, it replaced the University Transition Test, which was in use since 2020, and is considered as the official replacement for the University Selection Test, which was in use since 2003.

== Examination ==
The Higher Education Access Test (PAES) consists of five tests: two compulsory tests (Reading comprehension in the Spanish language, and Mathematics 1), two elective tests (Science and History and Social Sciences), and Mathematics 2, which is required for admission to certain university courses. Each of the tests has an allotted time and number of questions independent from each other.

The PAES is administered jointly by the Department of Evaluations, Measurement and Educational Registration (DEMRE) and the Undersecretary of Higher Education. The test has a score range between 100 and 1000, unlike its predecessor, whose range was between 150 and 850. Also, unlike the University Selection Test (PSU), both the University transition test (PTU) and the PAES could be taken twice in the same year with the Winter and RegularPAES. Unlike its predecessors, PAES holds a focus in evaluating skills parallel with the school subject knowledge, as stated by the Ministry of Education and DEMRE.

== History ==
PAES is the replacement test for the PTU, which was set in place between 2020 until 2022 as the replacement for the PSU and the transition test between the PSU and the PAES.

The first instance of PAES was taken between 28 and 30 of November 2022, with over 270,000 test takers across 667 locations. The 2023 winter PAES was the next instance of the test, taken in mid-June of 2023 with 79 locations, and later in the same year in November the regular PAES took place. The 2024 edition of the PAES was taken by over 258,000 students across 789 locations, with an 88% attendance rate. The 2025 PAES featured a record-breaking number of students at over 300,000 across 736 locations.
