= Antiguo Cuscatlán =

Antiguo Cuscatlán Ciudad de Antiguo Cuscatlán
- District
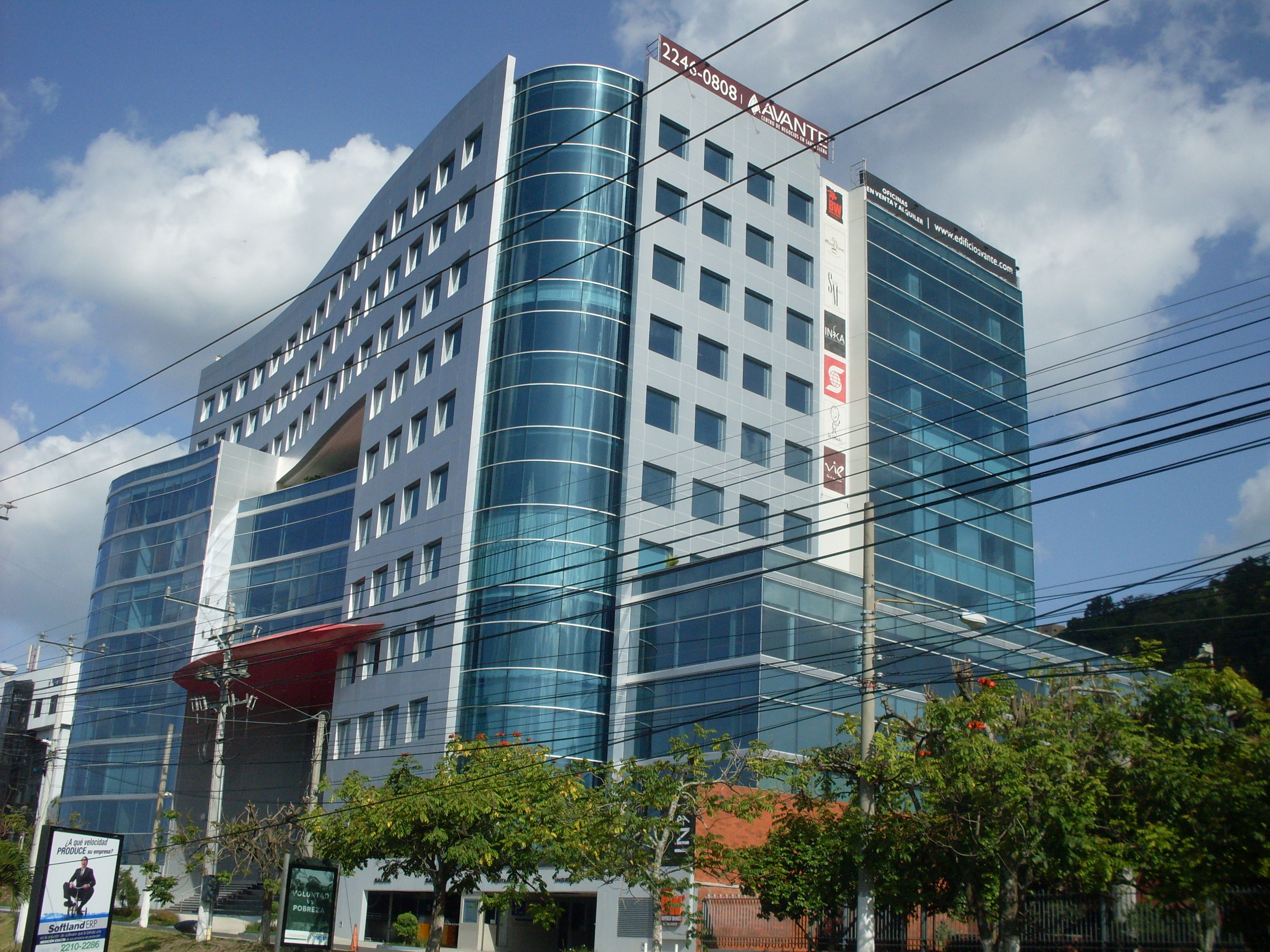
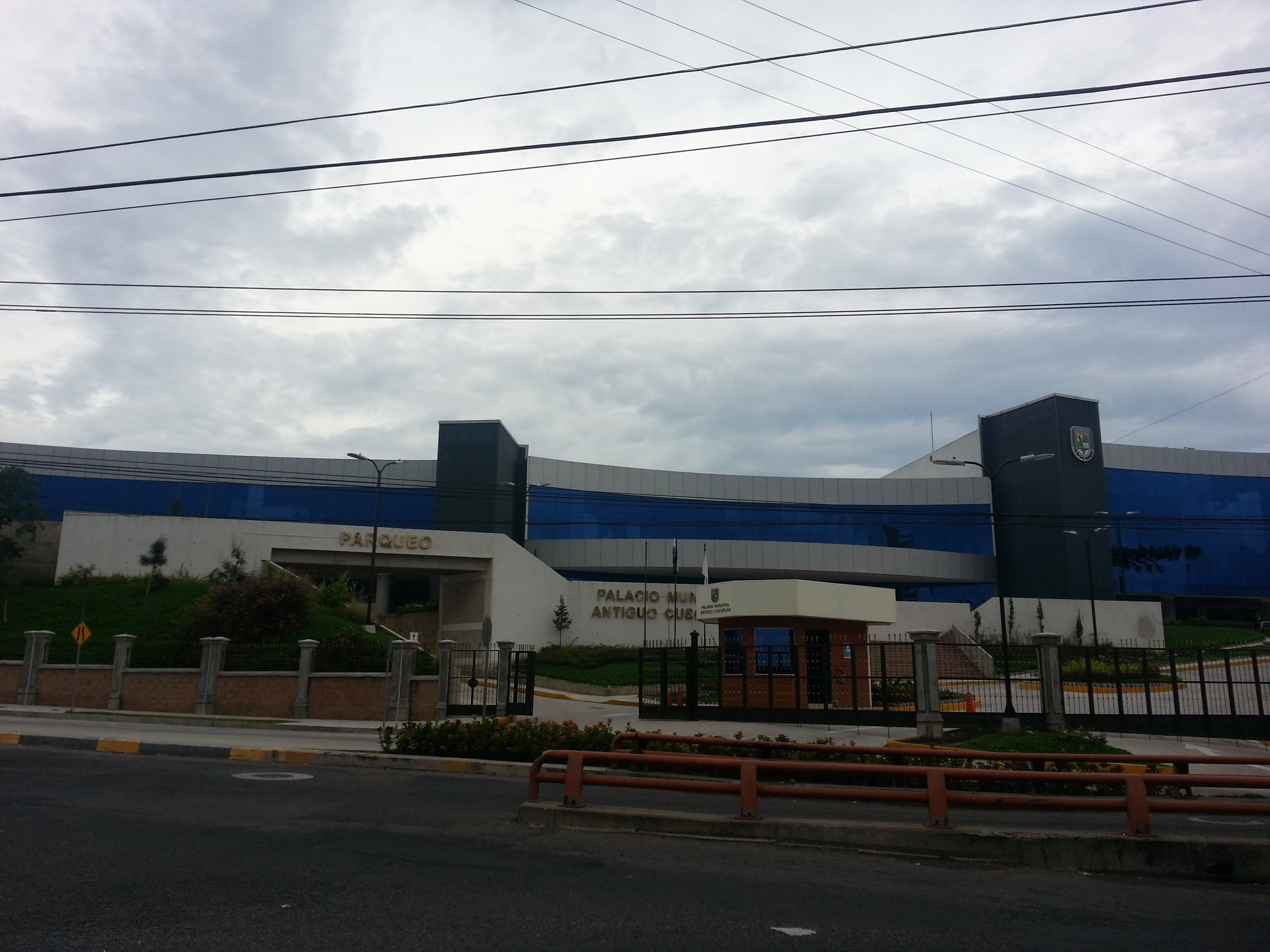
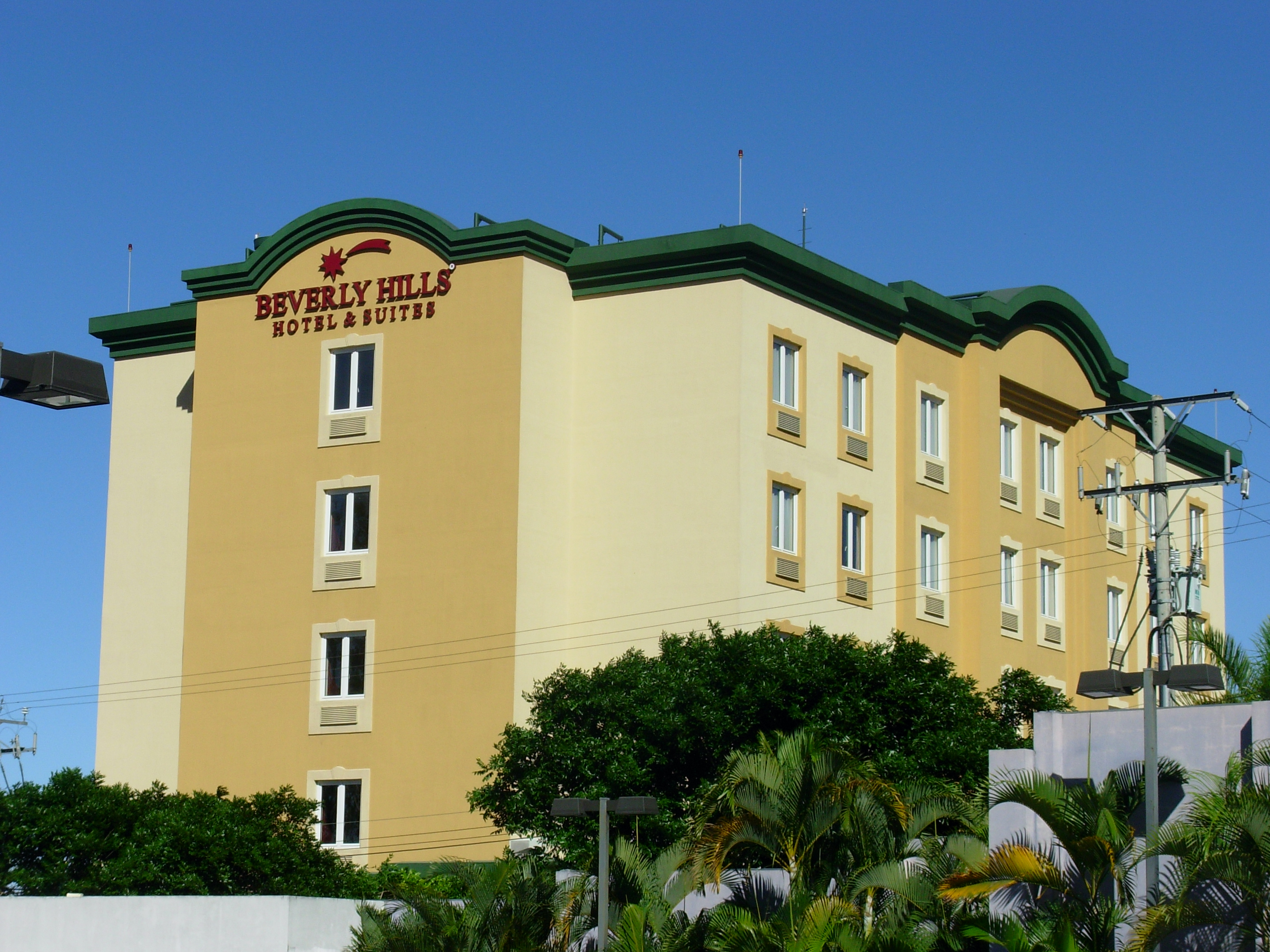
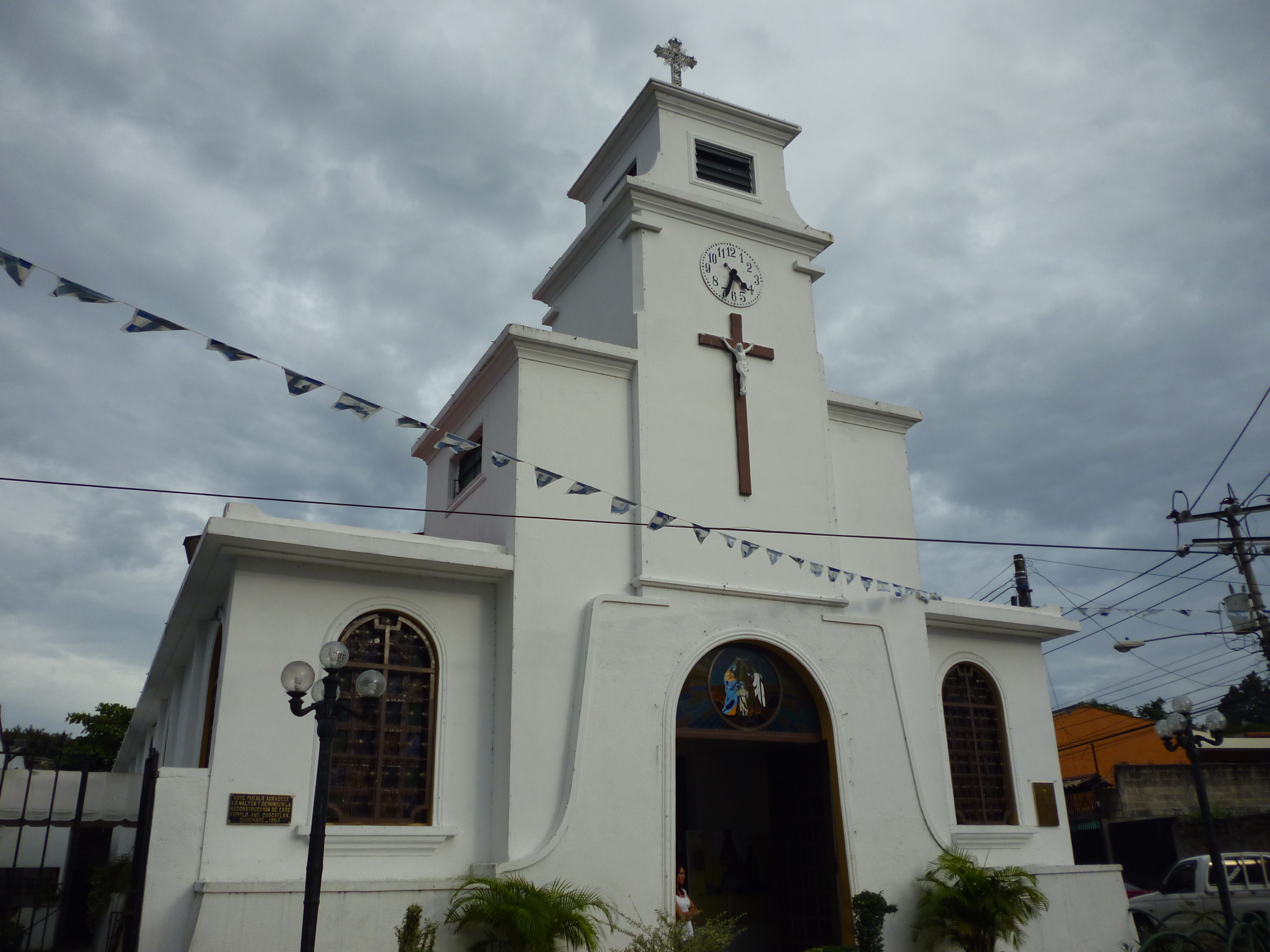
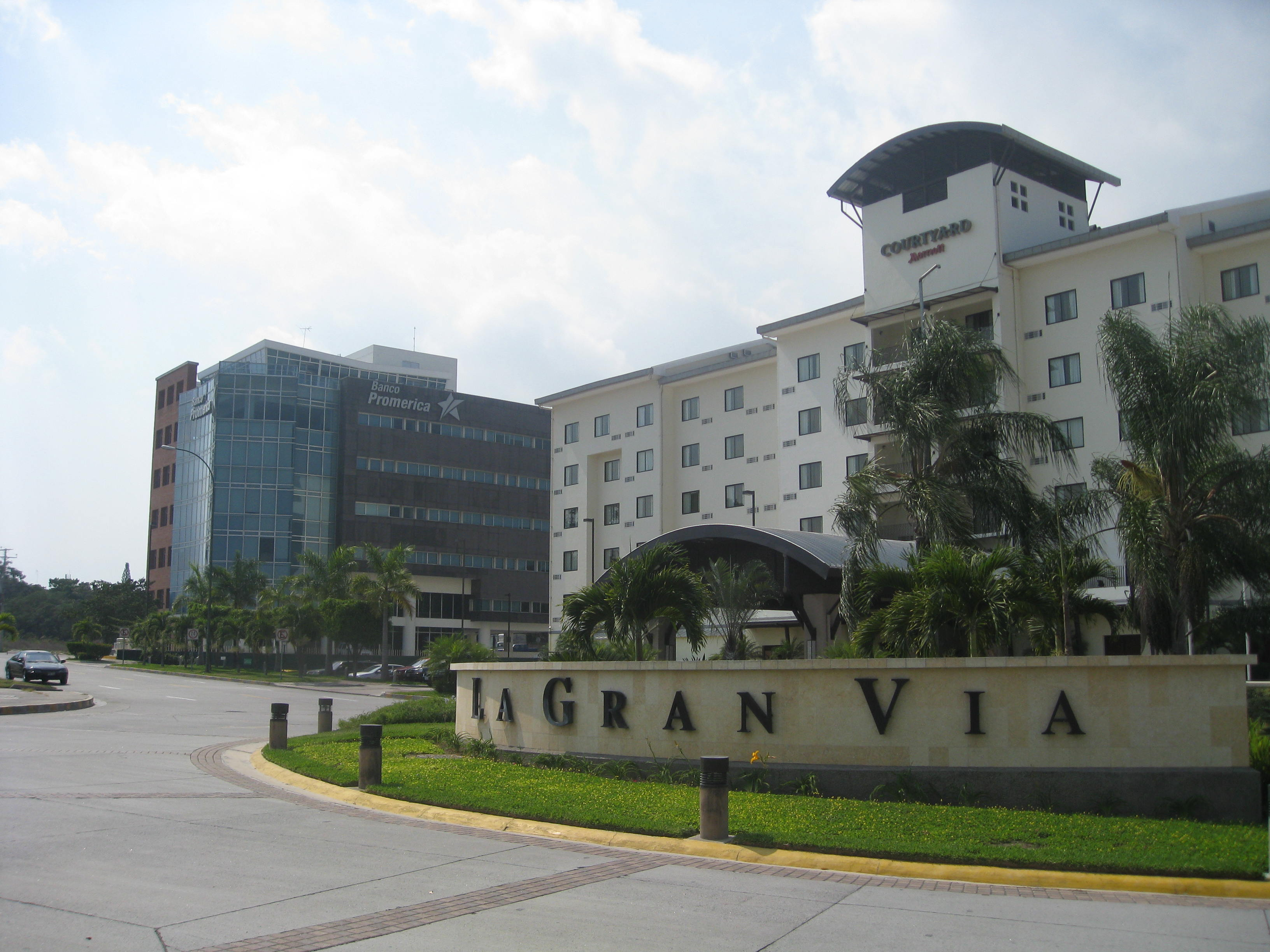
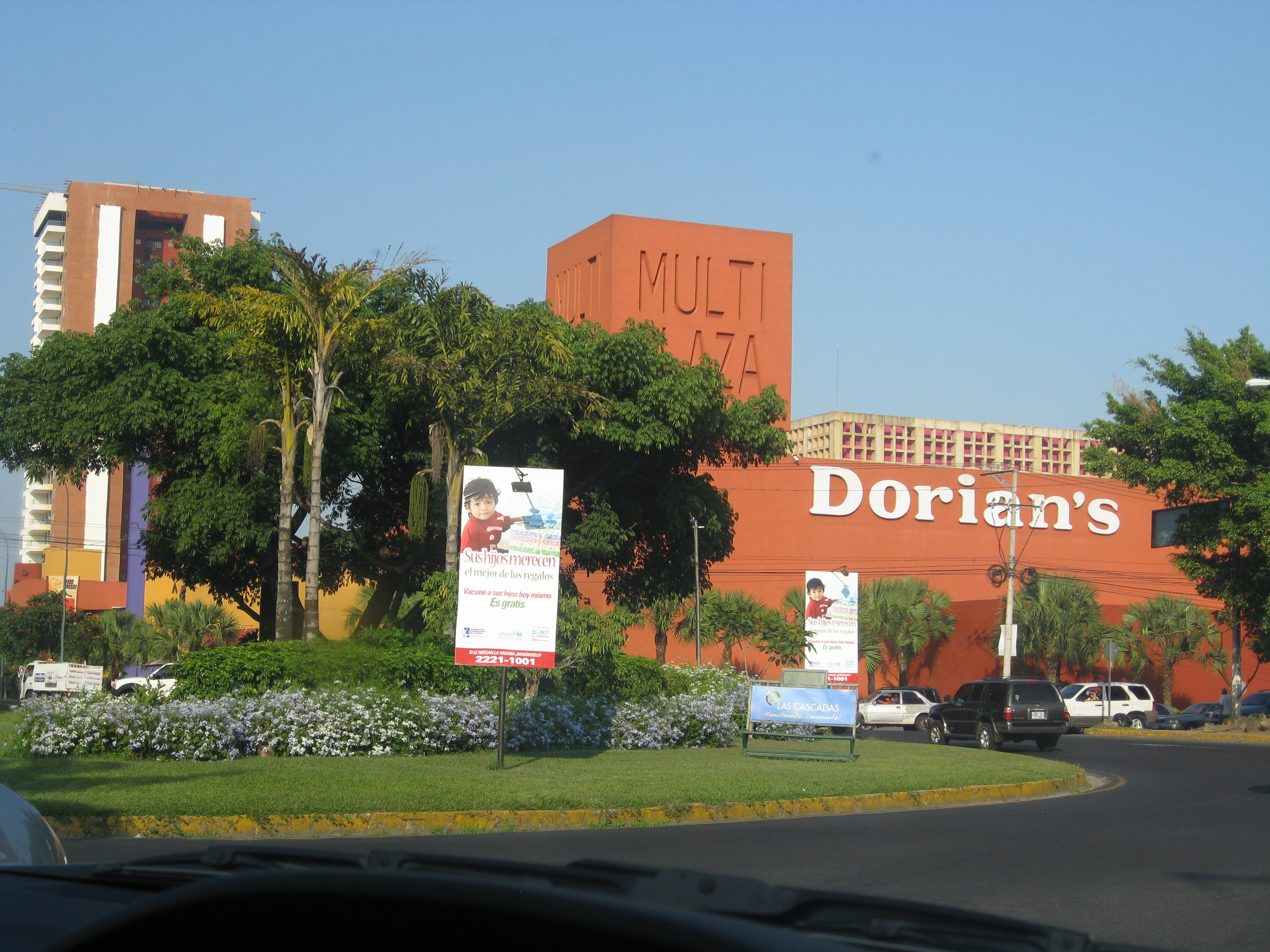
- Images from top, left to right: Torre Avante, Palacio Municipal de Antiguo Cuscatlán, Beverly Hills Hotel, Iglesia de Los Santos Niños Inocentes, Marriot Hotel and Banco Promerica, Multiplaza Mall.

- Flag
- Nickname: Antiguo
- Location within El Salvador
- Coordinates: 13°40′23″N 89°14′26″W
- Country: El Salvador
- Department: La Libertad Department
- Municipality: La Libertad Este
- Establishment as Town: 30 March 1971
- Establishment as City: 19 February 1987
- Determined as District: 1 May 2024

Government
  - Type: Mayor - Council Government
  - Mayor: Milagro Navas (as Mayor of La Libertad Este)(Alianza Republicana Nacionalista)
  - Councilmebers: Edwin Gilberto Orellana; Rafael Hernandez Dale; Claudia Cristina Ventura; Anna Maria Copien; Juan Jose Alas Castillo; Francisco Antonio Castellón; Carlos Humberto Mendoza; Yolanda Concepción Peña; Elizabeth Andrade de Jovel

Area
  - District: 19.41 km^{2} (7.49 sq mi)
- Elevation: 849 m (2,785 ft)

Population (2024)
  - District: 37,451
  - Rank: 37th in El Salvador
  - Density: 1,929/km^{2} (4,997/sq mi)
  - Urban: 37,068
  - Rural: 383
- Demonym: Cuscatleco
- Time zone: UTC−6 (Central Standard Time)
- SV-LI: CP 01502
- Area code: + 503
- Website: www.libertadeste.gob.sv (in Spanish)

Antiguo Cuscatlán (colloquially known as Antiguo) is a municipality in the La Libertad department of El Salvador; its eastern tip lies in the San Salvador Department part of the Metropolitan Area of San Salvador, southwest of San Salvador and southeast of Santa Tecla. The population was 47,956 at the 2020 census. Antiguo Cuscatlán can be translated as Old Jeweled City: Antiguo means ancient or old in Spanish, and Cuscatlán means jeweled city in Nahuat. The city used to be the capital of the Pipil or Cuzcatecs, before the Spanish conquest of the New World.

The historic downtown sits on the foothills of La Cordillera del Bálsamo, and the city extends towards the Cordillera del Bálsamo on the south and on the foothills of the San Salvador Volcano on the north. The estimated per capita income for the city was $22,783 in 2013, which is 5.9 times higher than the national per capita (nominal).

Because Antiguo Cuscatlan is part of the San Salvador metro area, it is often confused as part of San Salvador.

== History ==
According to Pipil texts Antiguo Cuscatlán was founded as Cuzcatlan (meaning "place of jewels" in Nahuatl) in 1054 by Topiltzin Atzil, the last king of Tula of Anahuac. It was a city populated by ten thousand, with an additional twelve thousand people who lived in xacal; straw huts distributed at the edge of a maar (crater) which housed the sacred lake of Cuscatlan. It was the capital of a larger monarchic state.

On Saturday June 17, 1524, led by Pedro de Alvarado, the Spanish conquistadors found the doors of Cuscatlan, capital of the Lordship of Cuscatlan. The company consisted of one hundred fifty units of infantry, cavalry and one hundred other slaves, prepared to attack the kingdom and take over the regional capital. Despite the resistance, the Spanish were victorious and incorporated the municipality into the domains of the Iberian metropolis.

The place was less relevant thereafter, as the town was caught in the dynamics of the rest of the country, which exploited its resources ending the colony. After the independence of Central America, San Salvador surpassed Antiguo Cuscatlan in importance, relegating it to a mere local capital.

In the present day, Antiguo Cuscatlan has gained an important edge, hosting major institutions, plazas, corporative headquarters and the biggest U.S Embassy of the region.

== Economy ==
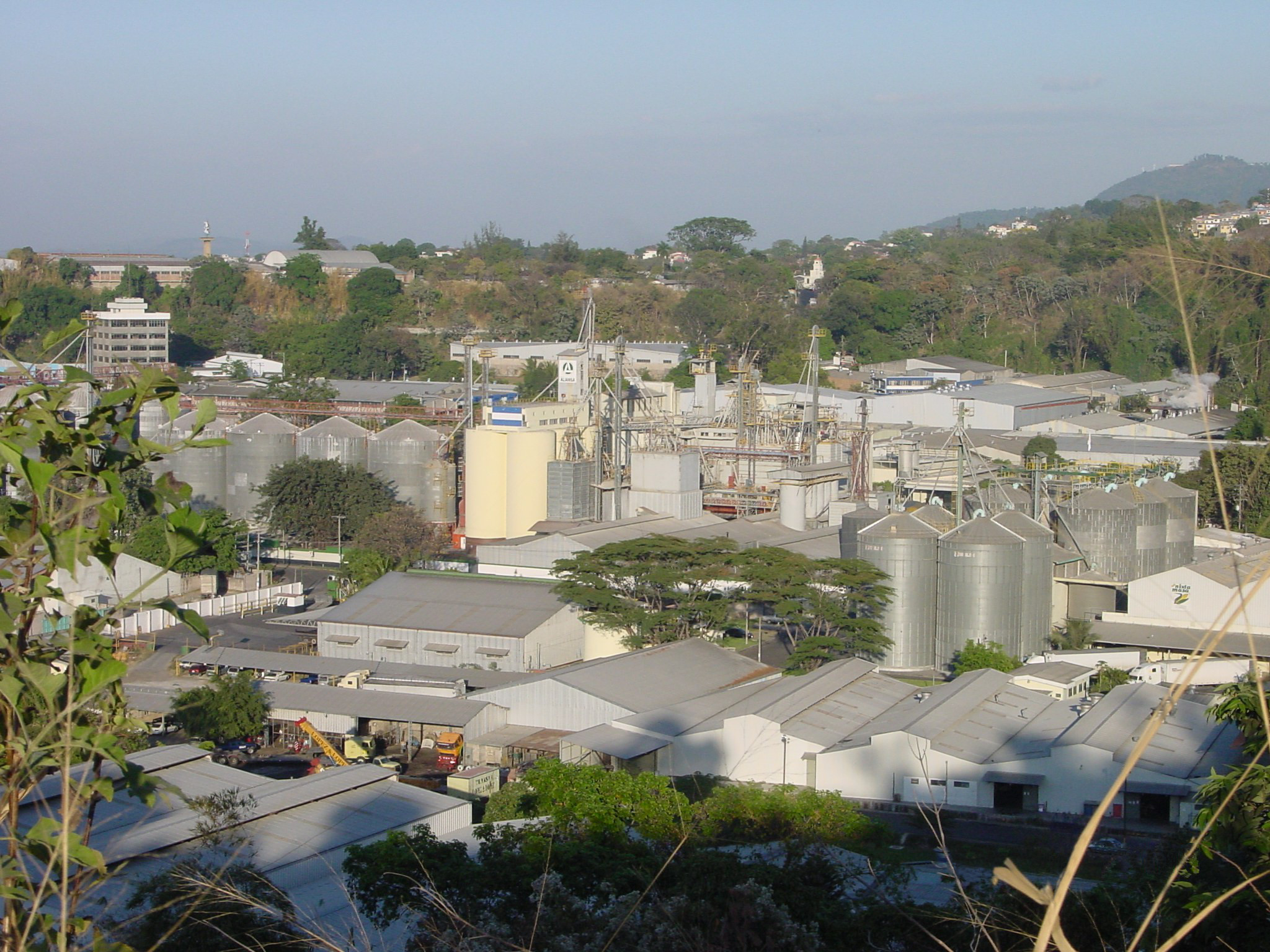
Plan de La Laguna Industrial Zone, Antiguo Cuscatlan

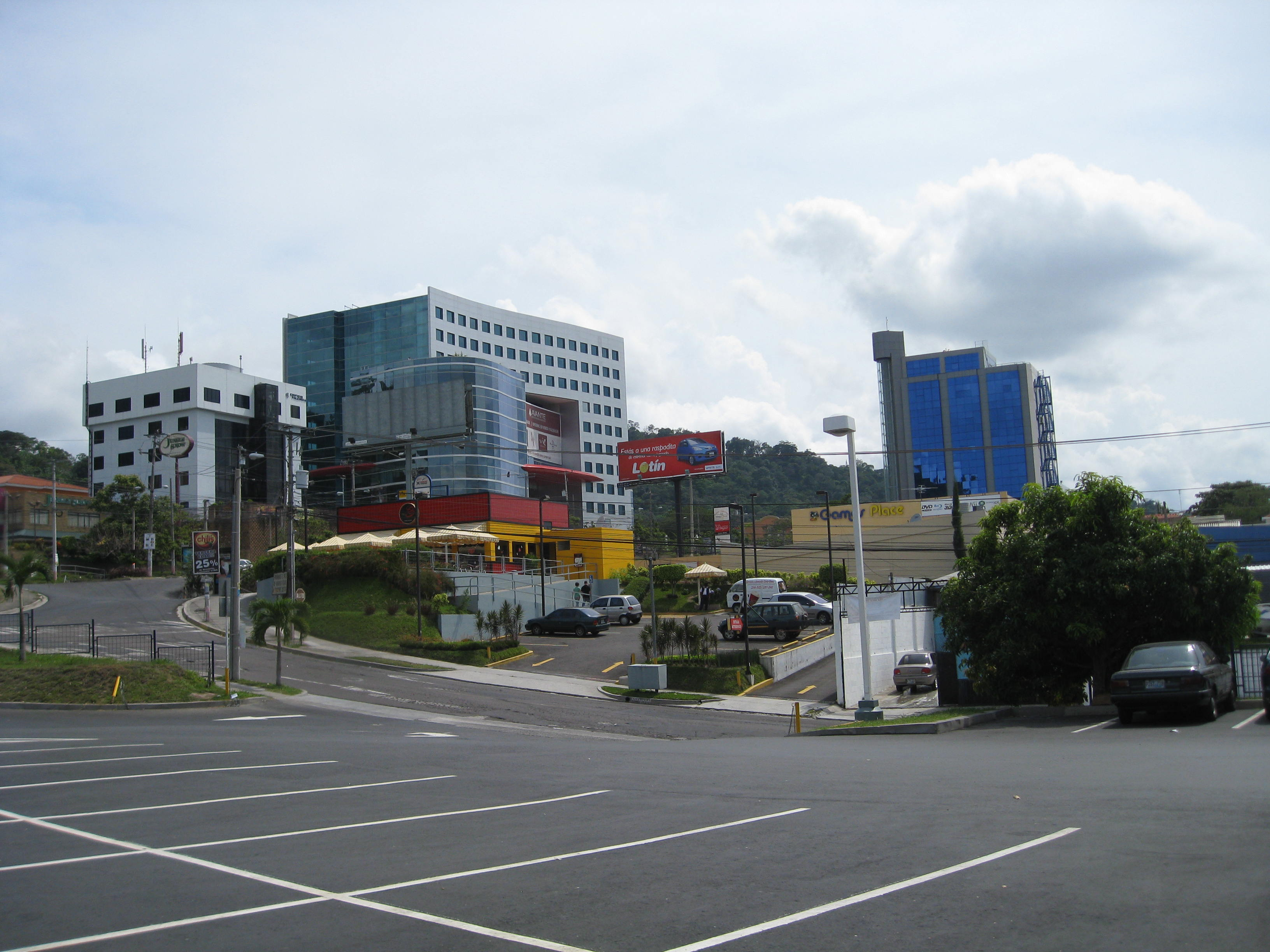
Downtown Antiguo

The majority of the population in the municipality live in the urban center, it is by far the most urbanized municipality in the country, but there are still a couple of people that live in the rural areas in the municipality on the southern area were the Cordillera del Balsamo passes through. It has three industrial zones: Santa Elena, Plan de La Laguna and Merliot. There are food, plastics, metal, textiles and chemicals factories. Tourist sites are the Basilica of Guadalupe and the Botanical Garden of Plan de la Laguna. One of the largest business centers in the country, and in Central America was opened during the mid 2010, this building reflects the boom of modern architecture in country, and the productive development of the country.

=== Plan de la Laguna Industrial Zone ===
South of the city is The Industrial Zone “Plan de La Laguna”, which is home to many industrial companies. Among these companies are: Confectionery (Central Dulcera), Plastic Industry (Salvaplastic), Maquila (Industry Merlet), made of flour for human consumption (Harissa), Concentrated Animal (ALIANSA), among many others, the last two (Harissa and ALIANSA) founded by the German landowner and businessman Walter Thilo Deinninger. The companies are united through the Association of Residents of the Zone and Industrial La Laguna (Asevilla). The Industrial Zone is also the most functional and organized one within any capital of Central America. In order to maintain the city, ecology safe the southern Side of the Industrial Zone is bordered by, Plan de La Laguna Botanical Garden. The Botanical garden also has a plant nursery, and it home to thousand of different plant species

== Municipal government ==
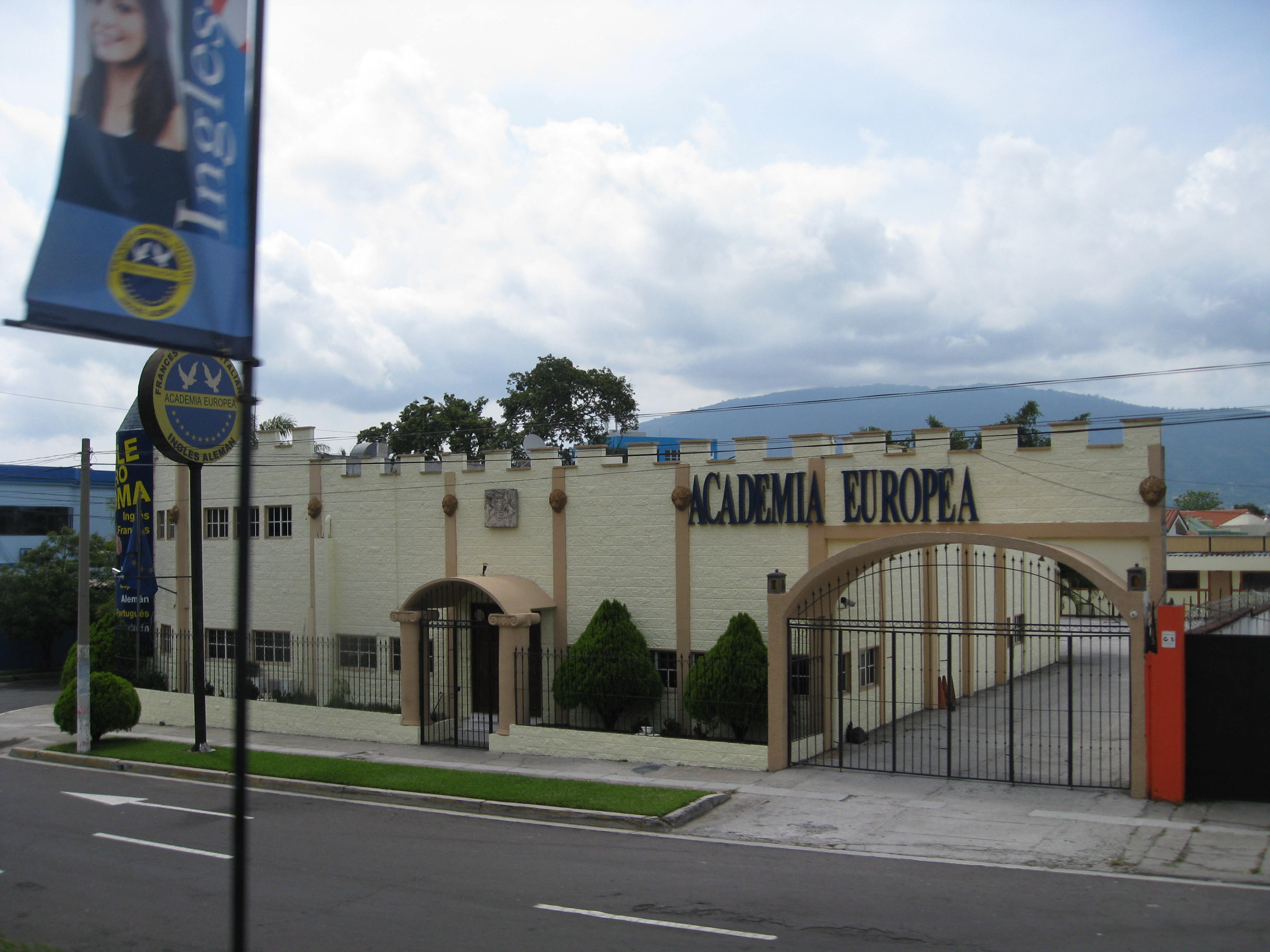
European Language Academy

Milagro Navas, a member of the Nationalist Republican Alliance party, has served as mayor since 1988. She has won twelve consecutive elections as Mayor of Antiguo Cuscatlan and one more for the Mayorship of the new municipality of La Libertad Este becoming the country's longest serving official. Various infrastructure improvement projects and institutional restructuring and renewal of the tax system have been attributed by some to Ms. Navas' administration.

=== Health ===
As far as health is concerned, they only have a health unit in the area of Merliot, and eight health clinics, not counting hospitals within the municipality. The municipal government manages a health care clinic, serving low-income residents, on the other hand, the Salvadoran Social Security Institute operates a community clinic.

Most people living in Antiguo attend to Hospital Diagnostico in San Salvador, just about 15 minutes from Antiguo Cuscatlan. Diagnostico is considered to be the top hospital in the country, and most priced.

=== Security ===
Within the Metropolitan Area of San Salvador, and in the country, Antiguo Cuscatlan is perhaps the safest city. Low Criminal Rates, no gang traffic, barely any reports of homicides or even attempts of homicides. Despite having low crime rates, there has been a slight rise in attacks on homes and, which has led to the privatization of many roads and areas, by closing an entrance to a neighborhood with a gate, and security to allow one to go in. The patrols of the National Civil Police are sporadic patrols in conjunction with municipal police body

=== Education ===
Home to three private universities in the country: Albert Einstein University, Universidad Dr. José Matías Delgado and Universidad Centroamericana Jose Simeon Cañas, besides having several private schools, including the German School and San Francisco School, six public elementary schools basic and a National Institute of Secondary Education. Also has the campus graduate of the University Don Bosco. As for public schools there is only one located in the historic center of Antiguo, most children attend to bilingual private schools in San Salvador. On the Santa Elena Neighborhood the European Union opened an institute to learn the official European Union languages.

== Santa Elena ==
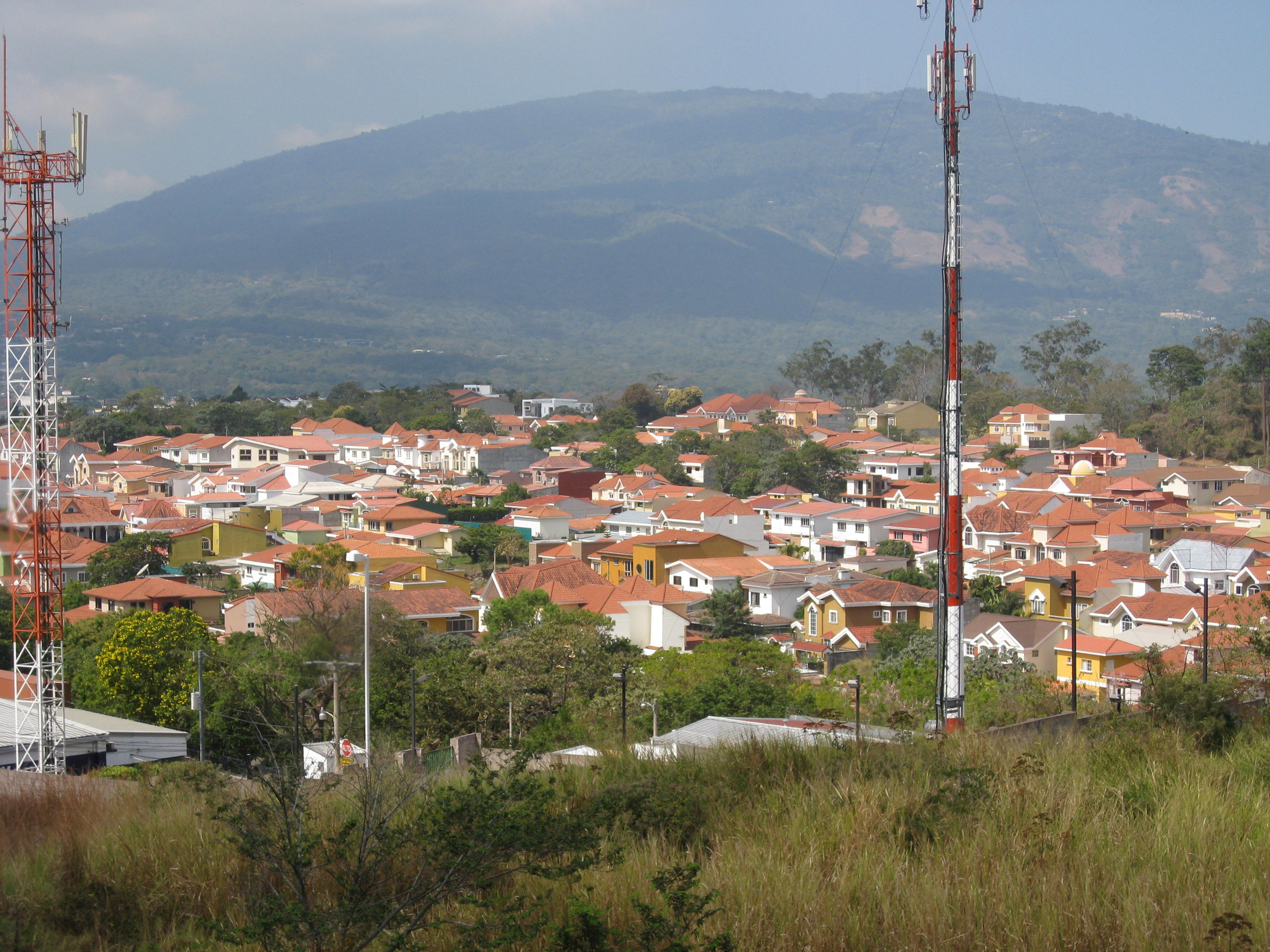
Santa Elena Neighborhood

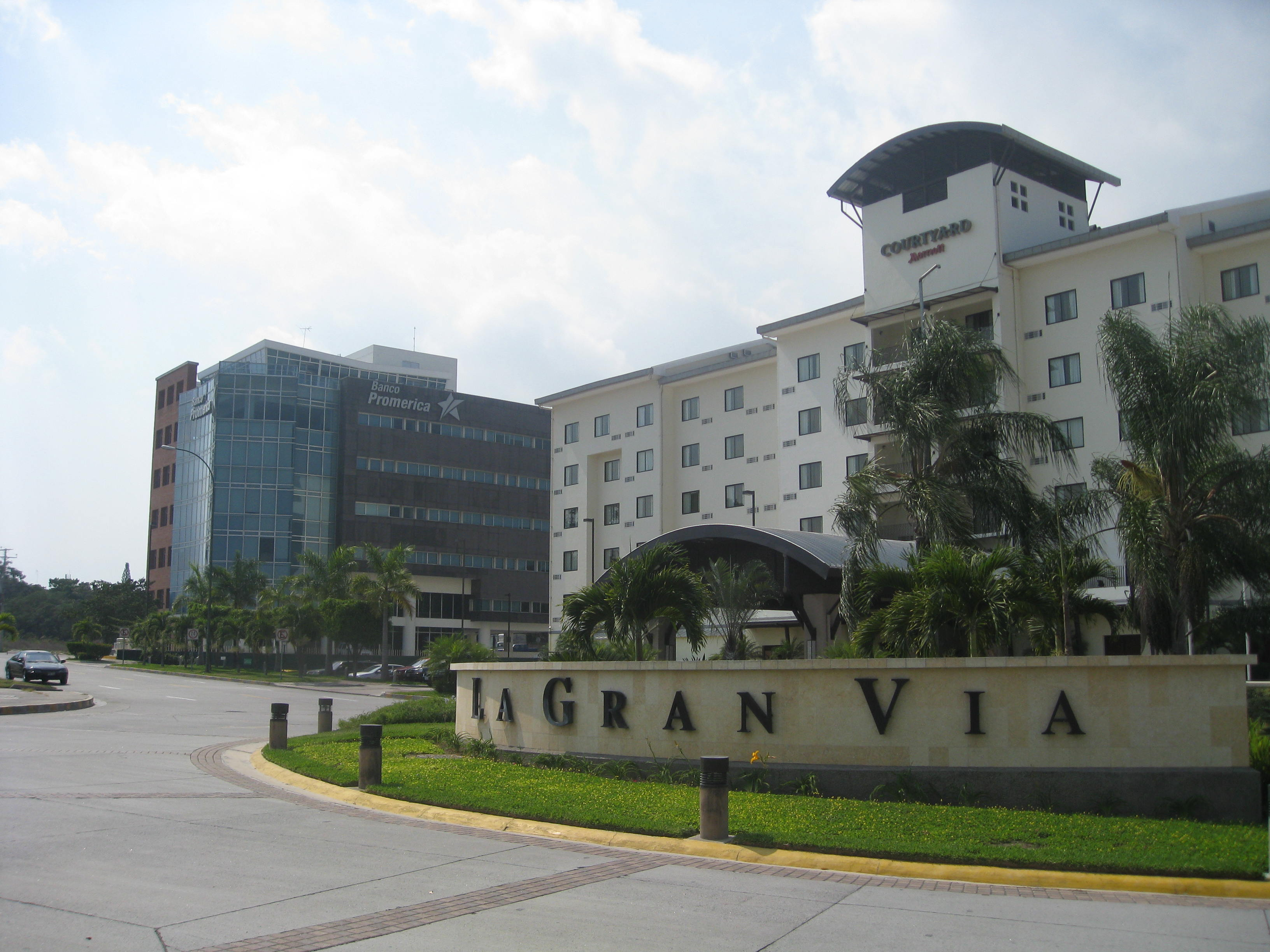
Courtyard Marriott Hotel

Santa Elena is the main neighborhood of Antiguo Cuscatlán, the neighborhood spans 65% of the municipality. Santa Elena is home to one of the world's largest American Embassy, as well as the Embassies of Malta and Belize.

=== Business ===
There are many businesses in the Santa Elena Neighborhood, the newest and most advanced business center is Edificio Avante, located next to the Beverly Hills Hotel, and on Boulevard Orden de Malta. There are also other business centers like Edificio Comercial, Edificio Valencia.

== Botanical Garden (Jardin Botanico Plan de la Laguna) ==
The La Laguna Botanical Garden is south of the city of Antiguo Cuscatlan, with an area of 30 blocks. In this extension, 19.32 blocks form a primary forest reserve, 4.6 blocks are for public use in 32 areas that are home to over 3,500 species of plants from all over the world, a performance area, café and children's games, and 19 blocks make up the La Laguna forest, which is serves as a reforesting conservation area for the future can be visited for scientific, educational and recreational purposes.

This garden is a fairly recent development. The first German immigrants who came here established the dairy industry, cattle and coffee plantations. Here they settled in the mountains that now border the Plan de La Laguna and reproduced. The Deininger family brought trees and plants from around the world to the garden of his house, which grew enormously.

Over time, with changes in settlement patterns and the inevitable urbanization of the place, the Deininger family supported the idea of protecting and preserving the wooded area now known as the La Laguna Botanical Garden. It was opened on December 22, 1978, and since then annually receives an average of 24,000 students.

The Garden has a herbarium, a computerized database and a library specializing in plant taxonomy. Staff maintain constant exchanges with other foreign and different herbal specialists who collaborate in the identification of samples collected in El Salvador.

== Geography ==
Antiguo Cuscatlan is in the municipality of the District of Nueva San Salvador, La Libertad department. It is bordered on the north by San Salvador, on the east by San Salvador and San Marcos, south of Nuevo Cuscatlan, and west by Nueva San Salvador. It is located in the geographic coordinates 13° 42'29 'LN (northern end) and 13° 37'56' LN (southern end), 89° 13'29 LWG (eastern end) and 89° 16'46 LWG (west end).

=== Soils ===
Soil types found in the municipality are: Andosols and Regosols, Inceptisols and Entisols (phases of rolling to ALOM) and Regosols, reddish clay and Anaosoles, Latosols, Entisols, Alfisols and Inceptisols (phases rolling to rugged mountain). There are volcanic detrital sediments with pyroclastic material and lava flows interspersed, pyroclastic material and andesitic and basaltic lavas.

=== Hydrography ===
The main river is the Chavez or Peche, rising to 2.5 miles (4.0 km) south of the town of Antiguo Cuscatlan, the confluence of two small unnamed streams. Its length within the town is 2 kilometers.

=== Terrain ===
There are two mountains in the area: The Horse and El Rosario. The Cerro La Montaña is located 4.1 kilometers southwest of the town of Antiguo Cuscatlan, and has an elevation of 1005 meters above sea level. El Rosario is located 1.4 miles (2.3 km) south from the city of Antiguo Cuscatlan, and has an elevation of 1025 meters above sea level. The Horse is located 3 miles (4.8 km) southwest of the town of Antiguo Cuscatlan, and has an elevation of 1032/3385 ft meters above sea level.

=== Climate ===
The amount of annual rainfall varies between 1,800 and 2,200 millimeters. Due to the high altitude (3385 ft) Antiguo Cuscatlan has a cool climate compared to the rest of the AMSS.

The hottest months in Antiguo Cuscatlan are March, April and May, with a mean high of 30C. The coolest months of the year are November, December, January and February with a mean high of 28C and a mean low of 16C. The lowest temperature recorded was 6C during a period of cold fronts were the temperature dropped several times in February, March 2010.

Climate data for Antiguo Cuscatlan
Month	Jan	Feb	Mar	Apr	May	Jun	Jul	Aug	Sep	Oct	Nov	Dec	Year
Mean daily maximum °C (°F)	29.3 (84.7)	29.1 (84.4)	30.0 (86.0)	31.0 (87.8)	30.8 (87.4)	29.5 (85.1)	30.1 (86.2)	29.0 (84.2)	28.0 (82.4)	28.1 (82.6)	27.0 (80.6)	26.6 (79.9)	26.0 (78.8)
Daily mean °C (°F)	22.2 (72.0)	22.8 (73.0)	23.4 (74.1)	24.5 (76.1)	24.2 (75.6)	23.3 (73.9)	23.3 (73.9)	23.1 (73.6)	22.8 (73.0)	22.4 (72.3)	20.5 (68.9)	21.4 (70.5)	22.4 (72.3)
Mean daily minimum °C (°F)	15.9 (60.6)	15.3 (59.5)	16.7 (62.1)	17.0 (62.6)	19.0 (66.2)	19.6 (67.3)	19.1 (66.4)	17.3 (63.1)	17.4 (63.3)	16.0 (60.8)	15.4 (59.7)	14.0 (57.2)	15.6 (60.1)
Average precipitation mm (inches)	5.0 (0.20)	2.0 (0.08)	9.0 (0.35)	36.0 (1.42)	152.0 (5.98)	292.0 (11.50)	316.0 (12.44)	311.0 (12.24)	348.0 (13.70)	217.0 (8.54)	36.0 (1.42)	10.0 (0.39)	1,734 (68.3)
Source: worldweather.org;

== Education ==
The German School of San Salvador, a German international school, Colegio Americano, Colegio San Francisco, Colegio Augusto Walte, Instituto Hermanas Somascas, Colegio Esparza are private schools within the city; public schools such as Centro Escolar Walter Thilo Deininger, Escuela de Educación Parvularia de Antiguo Cuscatlán and Instituto Nacional de Antiguo Cuscatlán are located in the city as well.

Also, Antiguo Cuscatlán is the home of several universities in the country, such as José Simeón Cañas Central American University, José Matías Delgado University, Universidad Albert Einstein and Universidad Don Bosco.

== Culture ==
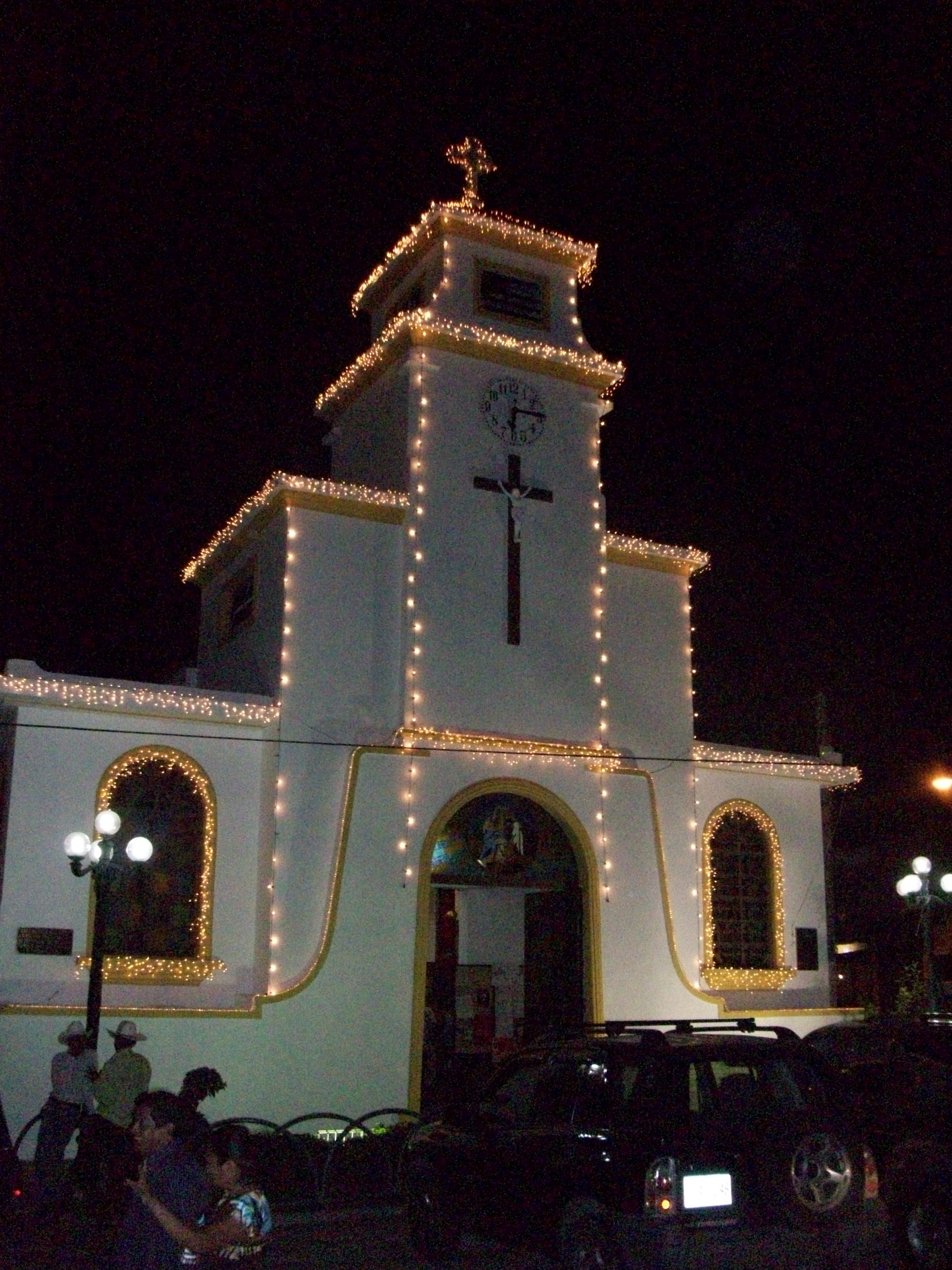
Catholic Church

In the municipality of Antiguo Cuscatlan different festivals are celebrated, such as the Corn Festival held between July and August. On the other hand, the December 12 celebrations held in honor of Our Lady of Guadalupe at the Basilica of Our Lady of Guadalupe. The festivities of the municipality are celebrated in honor of the "Holy Innocents Children" on 28 December at the Parish Church at the Center for Antiguo Cuscatlan.

=== Festivities ===
Antiguo Cuscatlan celebrations are dedicated to the Holy Innocents Children and celebrated every year on 28 December. This festival dates from the 16th century, during the colonial era and was celebrated with great pomp by a brotherhood composed of captains, stewards and tenacious.

Are revered as martyrs died for not only by Christ. They are also called "Flower of the Martyrs." St. Augustine speaks of them as buds destroyed by the storms of persecution in the time of opening to life.

=== Religion ===
In the town there are four Catholic churches and ten Evangelic (Protestant). The most important religious holiday occurs annually on December 28 in honor of the Holy Innocents Children.

The festival in the town dates from the colonial era, although the festival was celebrated in the Roman Catholic Church since the 5th century. Today's festivities include various religious, cultural, artistic and recreational activities organized by the city.

== Gallery ==
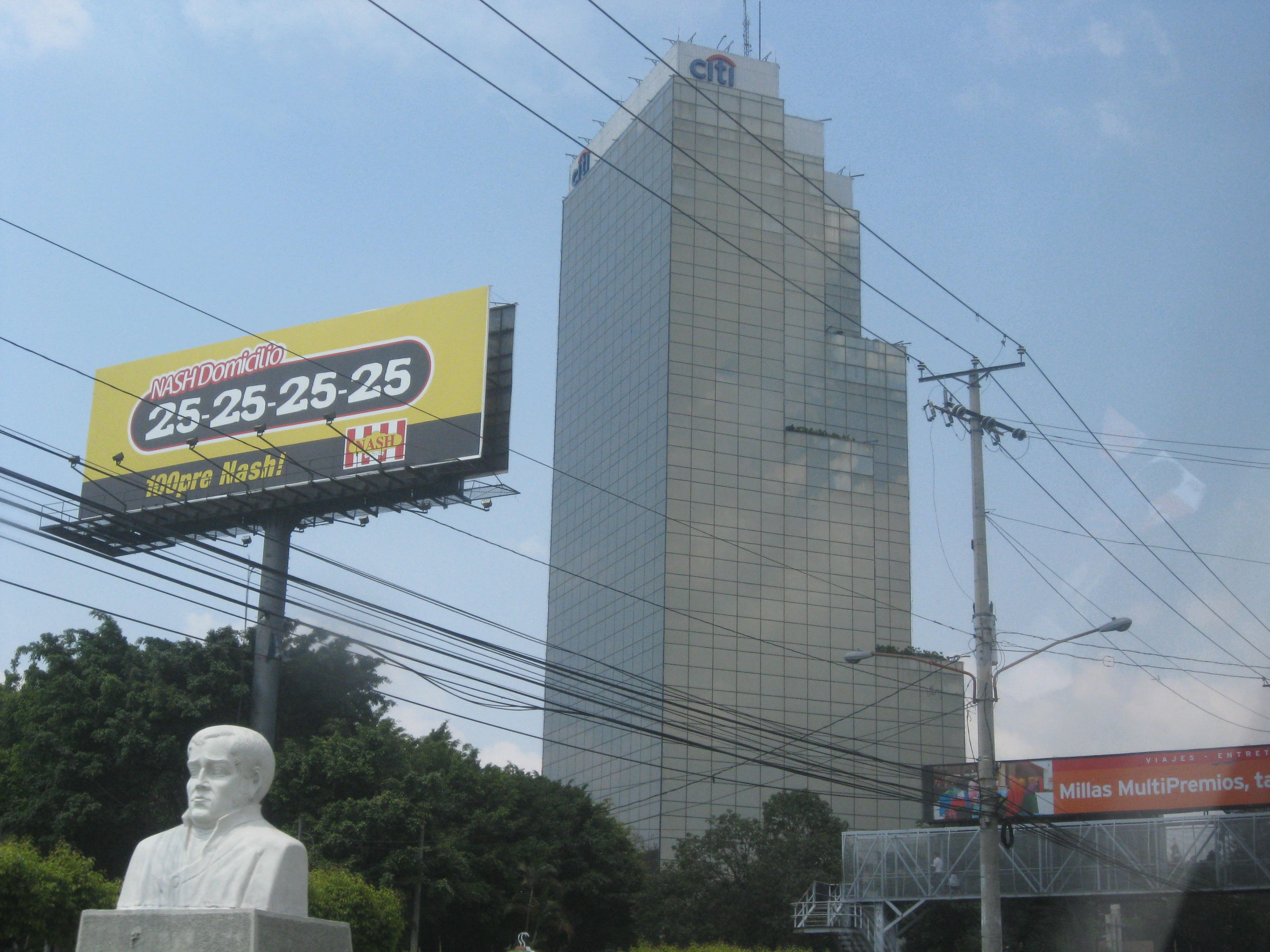
Citibank Tower

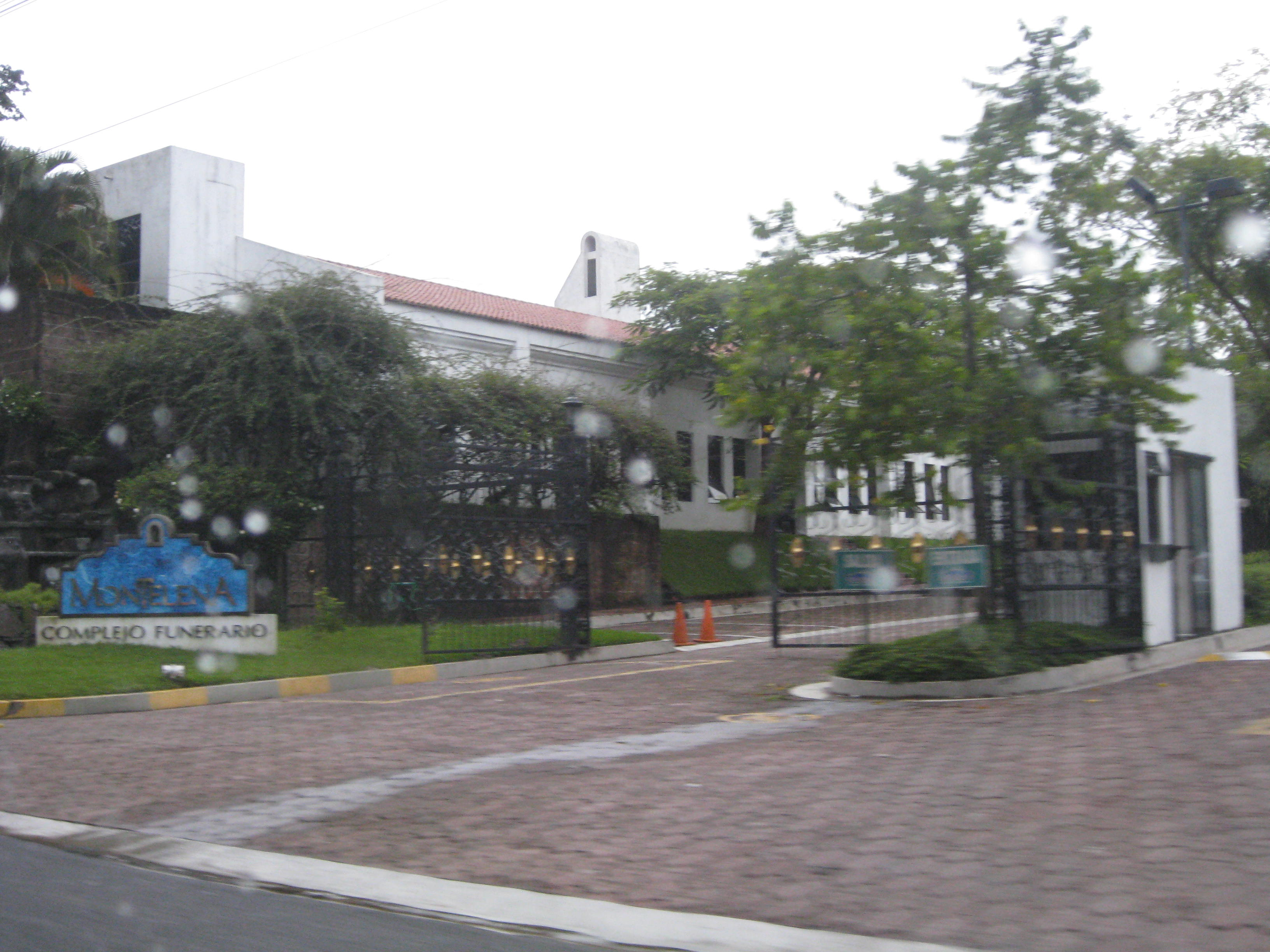

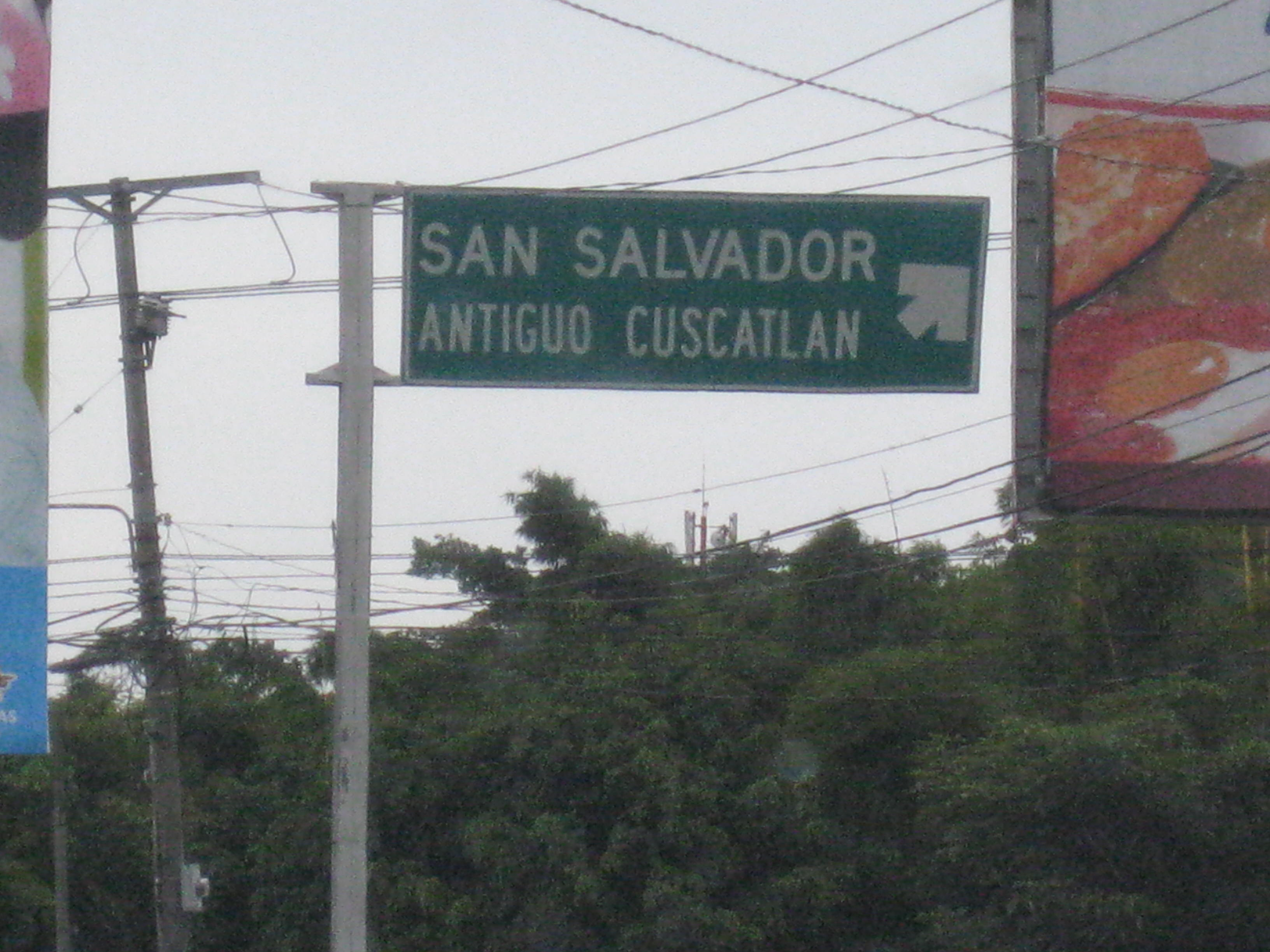

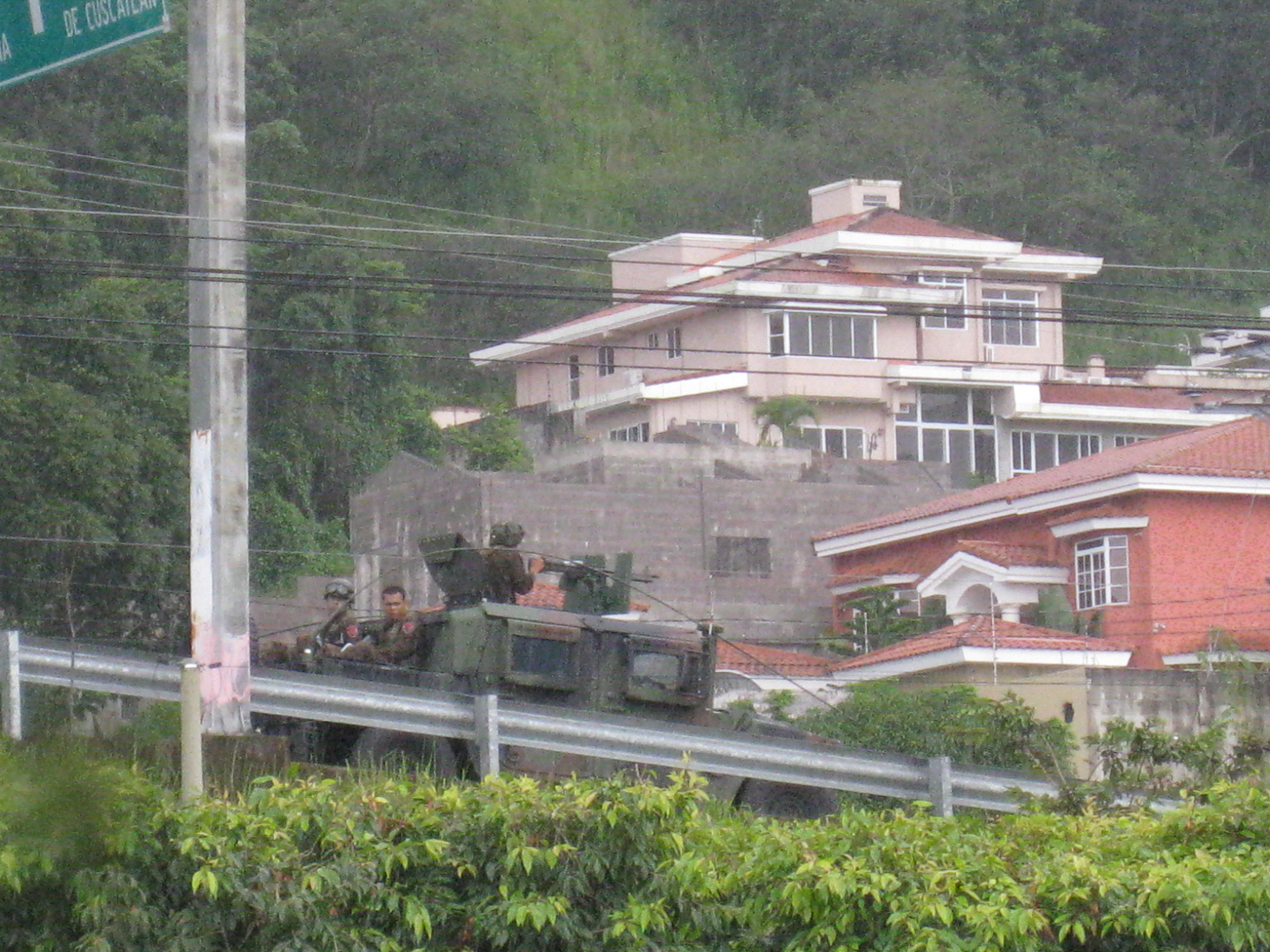

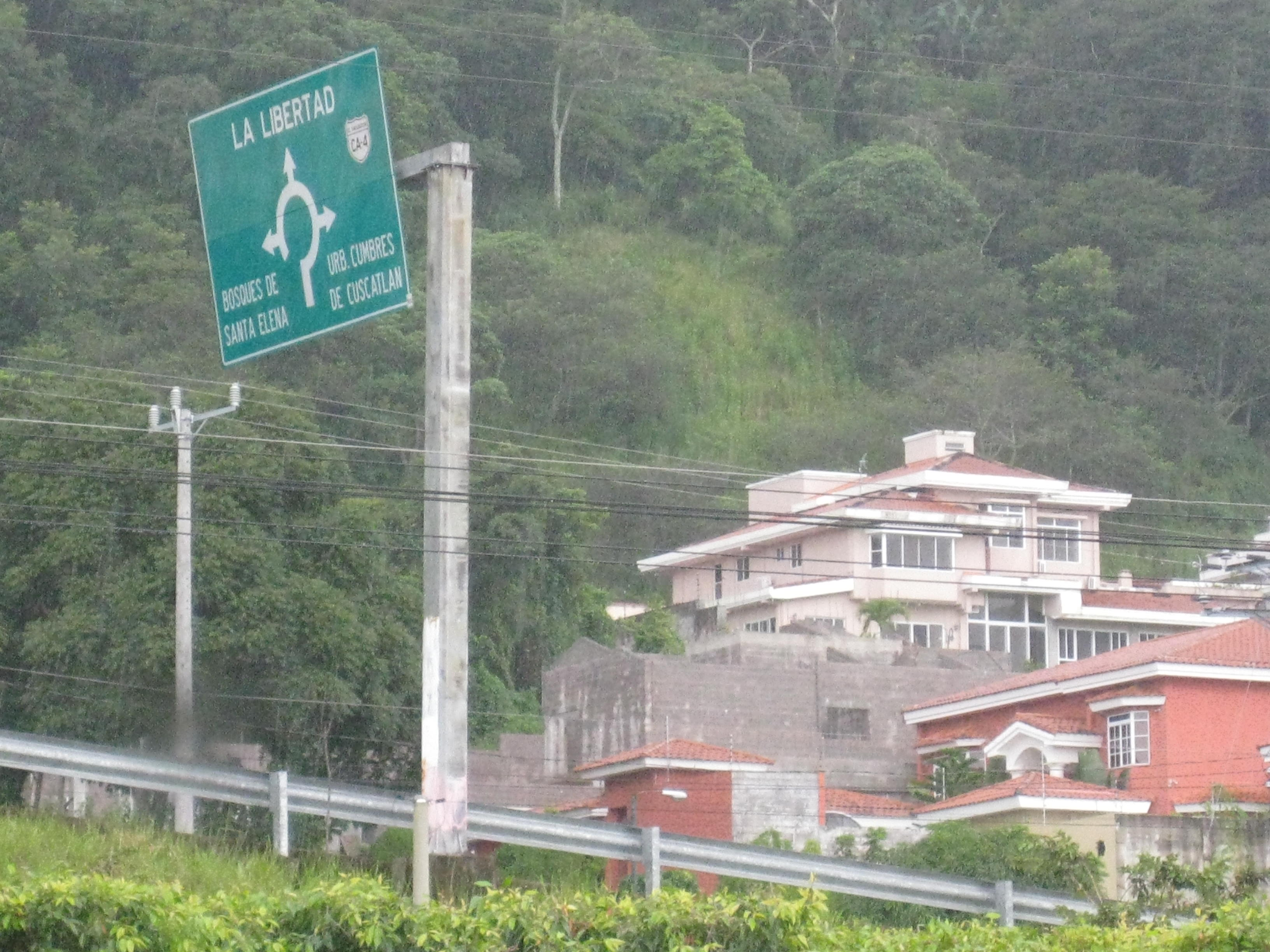

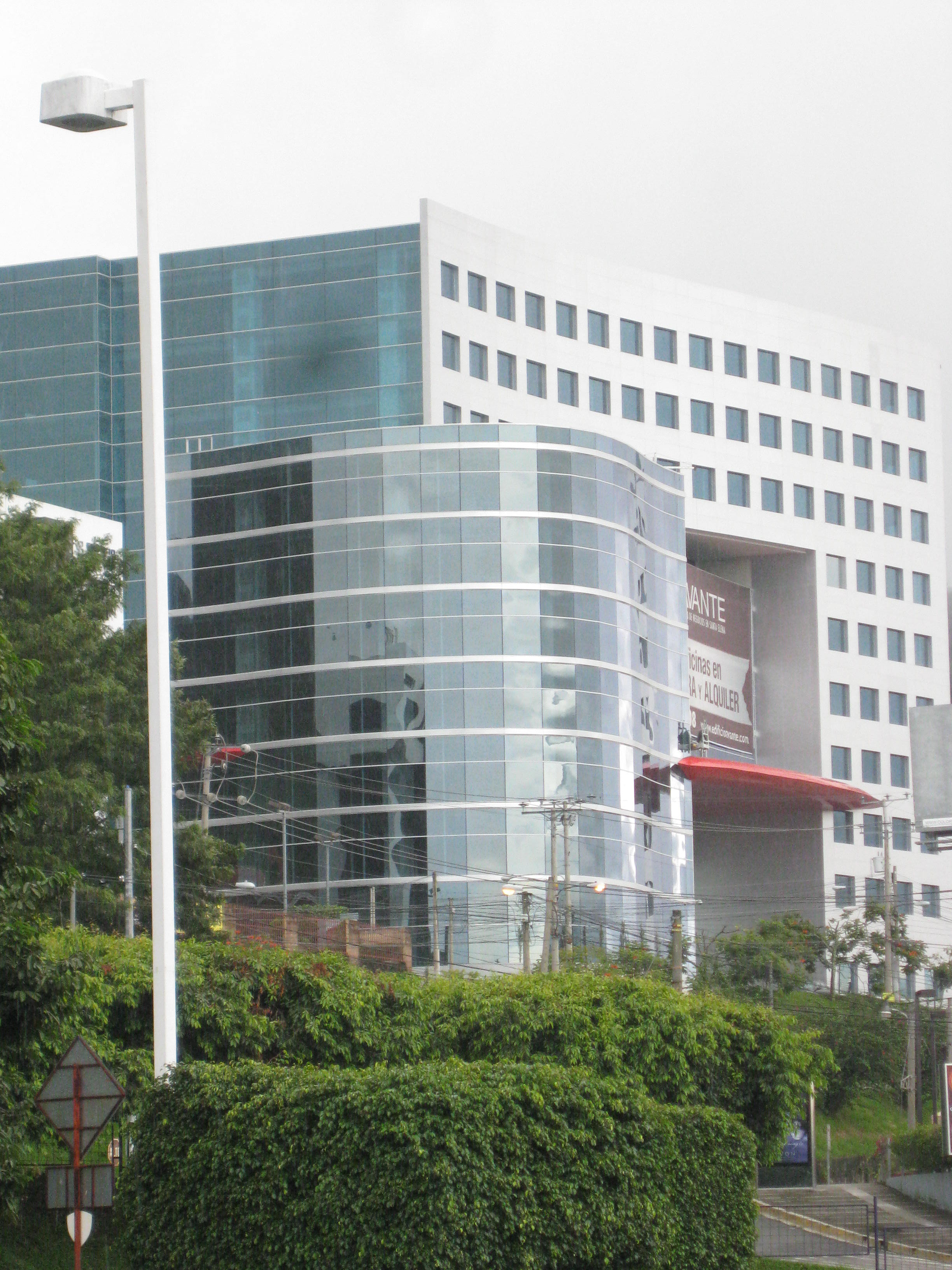

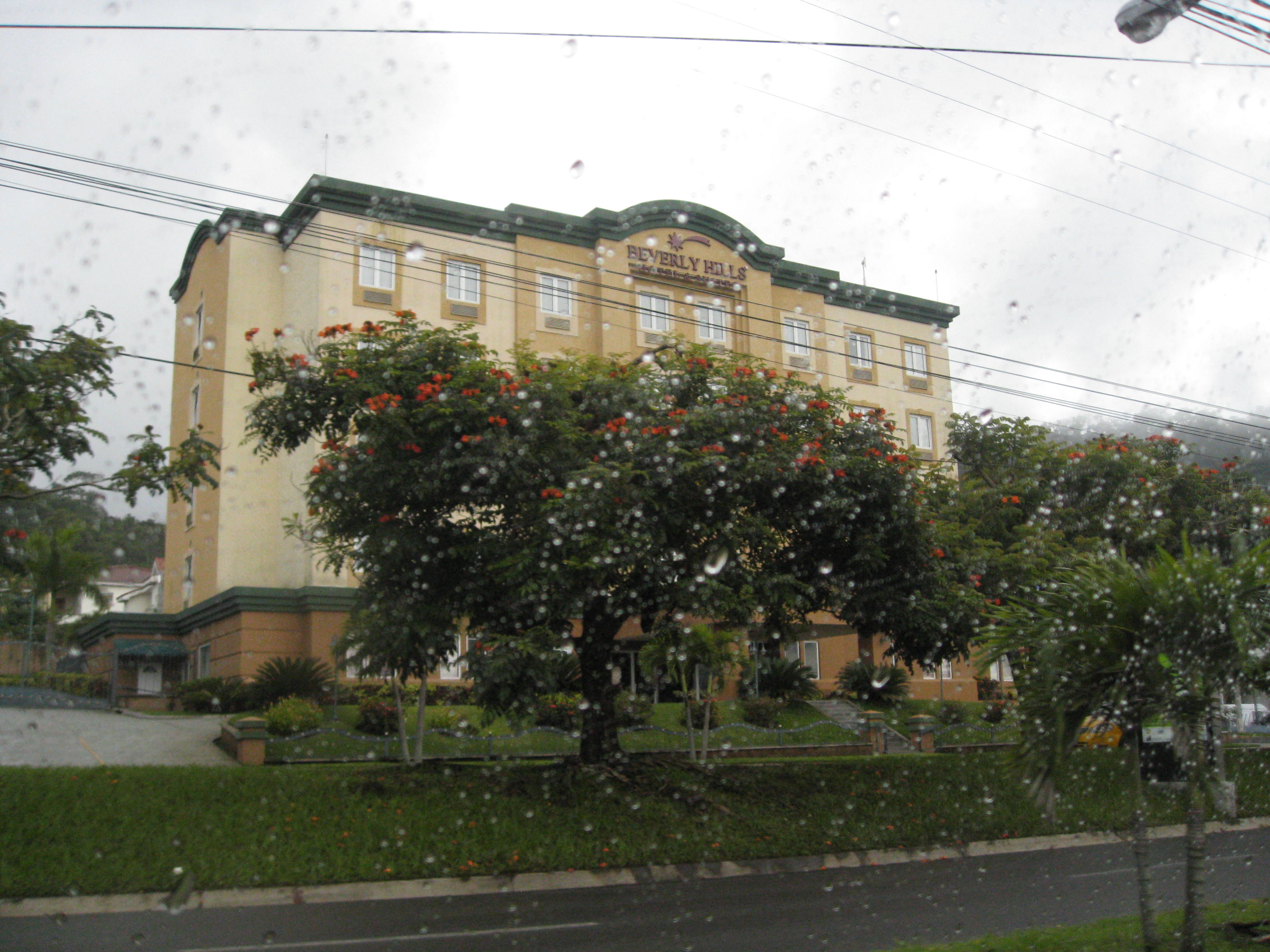

== See also ==
- San Salvador
- Nueva San Salvador
- La Libertad Department
- Estadio Nacional de El Salvador
- Torre El Pedregal
- Concepción de Ataco
