= Economy of El Salvador =

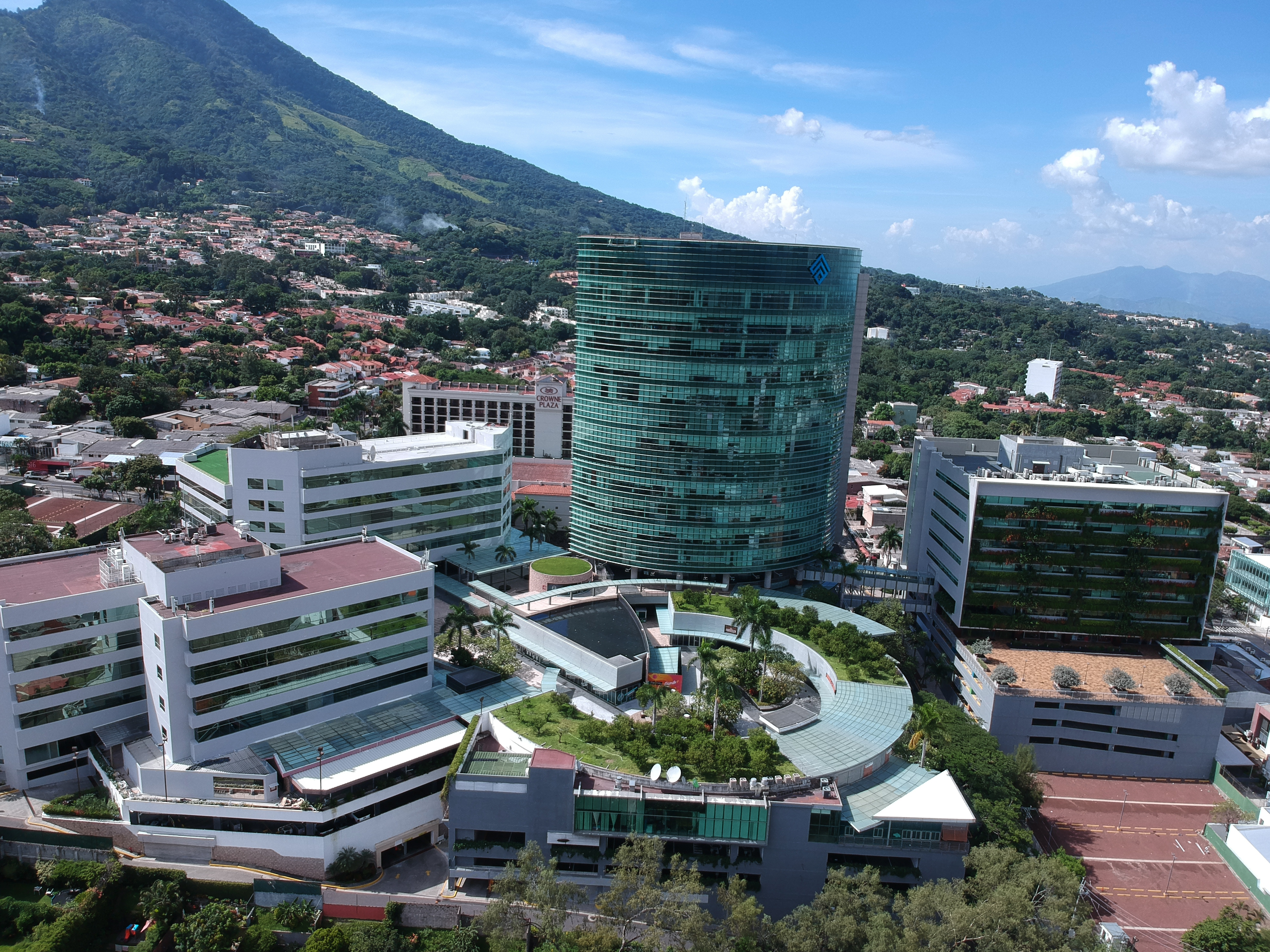
- Headquarters of World Trade Center San Salvador
- Currency: Bitcoin (XBT, ₿); United States dollar (USD, $)
- Fiscal year: calendar year
- Trade organizations: WTO, CAFTA-DR, SICA
- Country group: Developing/Emerging; Upper-middle income economy

Statistics
- Population: ▲6.83 million (2021 est.)
- GDP: ▲$39.838 billion (nominal, 2026); ▲$95.404 billion (PPP, 2026)
- GDP rank: 107th (nominal, 2026); 106th (PPP, 2026)
- GDP growth: 3.3% (2026)
- GDP per capita: ▲$6,196 (nominal, 2026); ▲$14,838 (PPP, 2026)
- GDP per capita rank: 115th (nominal, 2026); 112th (PPP, 2026)
- GDP per capita growth: 3.5% (2025)
- GDP by sector: agriculture: 10.5%; industry: 30.0%; services: 59.4%; (2012 est.)
- Inflation (CPI): 1.088% (2018)
- Population below national poverty line: ▼22.8% in poverty (2019 est.); ▼8.5% on less than $3.20/day (2017)
- Gini coefficient: ▼38.0 medium (2017)
- Human Development Index: ▲0.678 medium (2023) (132nd); ▲0.555 medium IHDI (102nd) (2023)
- Labor force: ▲2.89 million (2024) ▲45.6% employment rate (2024)
- Labor force by occupation: agriculture: 21%; industry: 20%; services: 58%; (2011 est.)
- Unemployment: 6.9% (2016 est.)
- Main industries: food processing, beverages, petroleum, chemicals, fertilizer, textiles, furniture, light metals

External
- Exports: ▲$8.491 billion (2021 est.)
- Export goods: offshore assembly exports, coffee, sugar, textiles and apparel, gold, ethanol, chemicals, electricity, iron and steel manufactures
- Main export partners: United States 40%; Guatemala 15%; Honduras 15%; Nicaragua 6%; (2019 est.)
- Imports: ▲$15.575 billion (2021 est.)
- Import goods: raw materials (such as thread from US ), consumer goods, capital goods, fuels, foodstuffs, petroleum, electricity
- Main import partners: United States 30%; China 14%; Guatemala 13%; Mexico 8%; Colombia 5.7%; European Union 4.0%; (2019 est.)
- Gross external debt: $17.24 billion (2019 est.)

Public finance
- Foreign reserves: ▲US$4.45 billion (31 December 2019)
- Revenue: US$5.89 billion (2017 est.)
- Spending: US$6.52 billion (2017 est.)
- Economic aid: US$300 million (2010 est.)
- Credit rating: Standard & Poor's: BB (Domestic); BB- (Foreign); AAA (T&C Assessment)
- All values, unless otherwise stated, are in US dollars.

The economy of El Salvador is considered a developing, upper-middle-income economy that relies heavily on services, exports, foreign family remittances and its unique status as a dollarized country. It has experienced relatively low rates of GDP growth, in comparison to other developing countries. Rates have not risen above the low single digits in nearly two decades. The Salvadoran economy is characterized by income inequality, with 37.8% of the population below the poverty line.

== Economic history ==
Historically, El Salvador had inequitable distribution of land, with most of it concentrated among the so-called Fourteen Families after El Salvador experienced an agrarian revolution in the late 1800s. President Rafael Zaldívar authorized the sale and privatization of Indigenous communal lands to facilitate farming. Whereas other states in Latin America had implemented land reforms, El Salvador still had a highly inequitable land system by the middle of the 20th century. El Salvador has been characterized as an oligarchic agro-export economy centered around large-scale coffee cultivation.

El Salvador had an economic boom in the 1920s, which was brought to an end with the onset of the Great Depression, which brought coffee prices down. Over the period 1926 to 1932, income from exports were halved.

The long-standing inequality culminated in the Salvadoran Civil War, a conflict fought between military-backed governments and left-wing guerrillas. The war destroyed vital infrastructure, crippled agricultural output and prompted a massive wave of emigration, primarily to the United States.

The signing of the Chapultepec Peace Accords in 1992 marked the start of El Salvador's economic recovery. The government embraced neoliberal, free-market policies that privatized state utilities and banks and joined the Dominican Republic–Central America Free Trade Agreement (CAFTA-DR) to spur manufacturing and exports.

The Salvadoran government undertook a monetary integration plan beginning 1 January 2001, by which the U.S. dollar became legal tender alongside the colón, and all formal accounting was undertaken in U.S. dollars. This way, the government has formally limited its possibility of implementing open market monetary policies to influence short term variables in the economy. Since 2004, the colón stopped circulating and is now never used in the country for any type of transaction; however some stores still have prices in both colons and U.S. dollars. The change to the dollar precipitated a trend toward lower interest rates in El Salvador, helping many to secure credit in order to buy a house or a car. Over time, displeasure with the change has largely disappeared, though the issue resurfaces as a political tool when elections are on the horizon.

In June 2021, president Nayib Bukele said he would introduce legislation to make Bitcoin legal tender in El Salvador. The Bitcoin Law was passed by the Legislative Assembly on 9 June 2021, with a majority vote of 62 out of 84. Bitcoin officially became legal tender ninety days after the publication of the law in the official gazette. As part of the law, foreigners can gain permanent residence in El Salvador if they invest 3 Bitcoin into the country. In January 2022, The International Monetary Fund (IMF) urged El Salvador to reverse its decision to make cryptocurrency Bitcoin legal tender. Bitcoin had rapidly lost about half of its value, meaning economic difficulties for El Salvador. President Bukele had announced his plans to build a Bitcoin city at the base of a volcano in El Salvador. In the first 18 months of Bitcoin adoption, the cryptocurrency was rarely used by the local population or tourists, leaving USD the de facto standard for transactions. The Bitcoin experiment was largely a failure.

In 2021, El Salvador received a $40 million loan for small enterprises and projects for climate action, from the European Investment Bank to the country's development bank, Banco de Desarollo de el Salvador. $20 million will be used to assist investments in renewable energy projects, specifically photovoltaics, biogas, and micro hydro projects. Up to 50% of the loan line will be used to assist small and medium-sized enterprises who were affected by the COVID-19 pandemic.

== Public sector ==
Departments of El Salvador

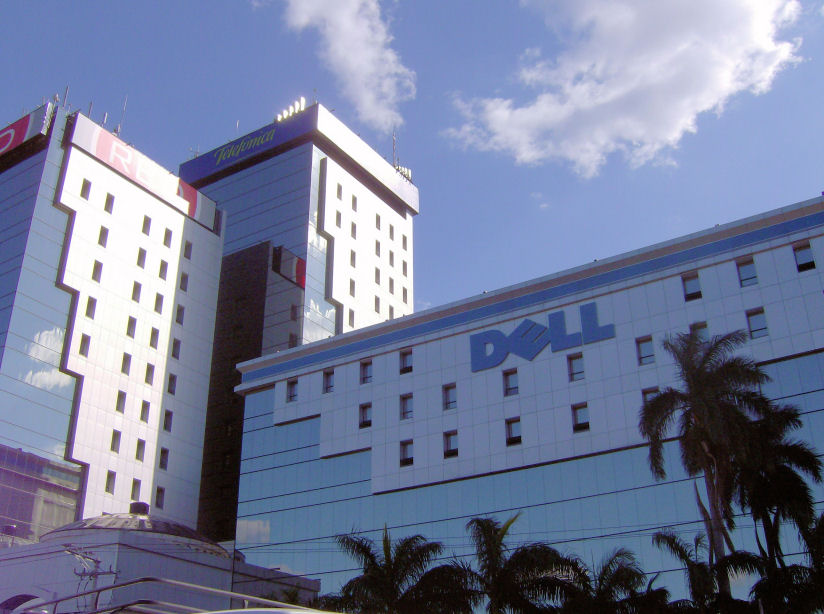
Centro Financiero Gigante (CFG) is a full five tower complex of office buildings located in San Salvador

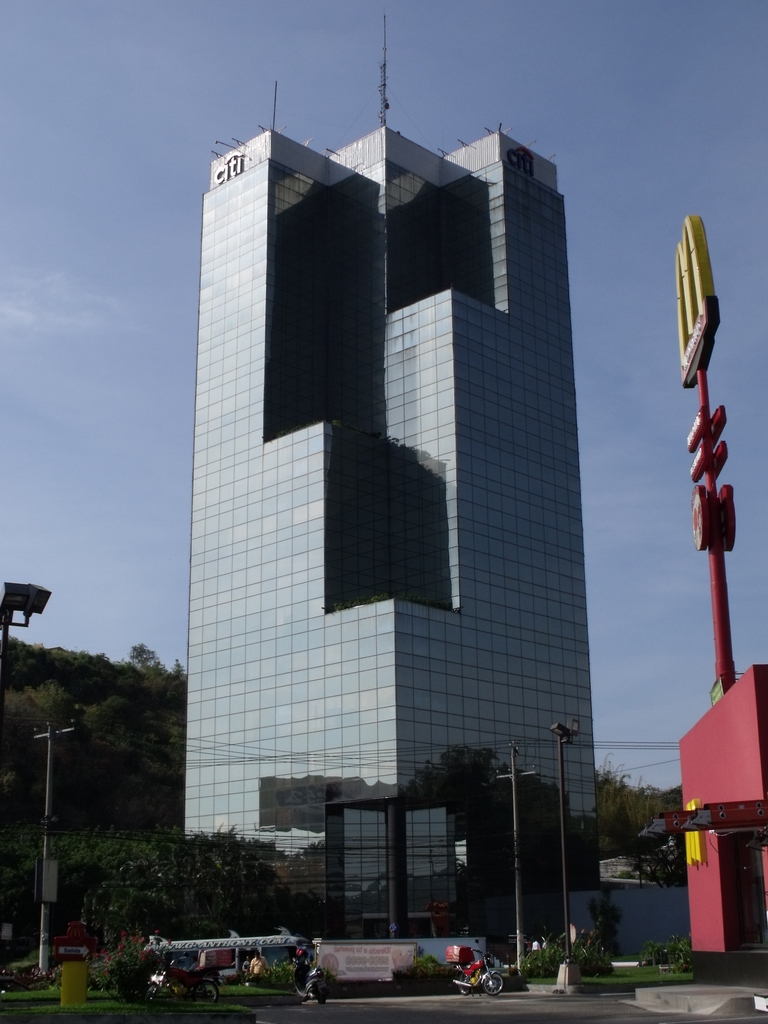
Cuscatlan Bank is headquartered at Torre Cuscatlán

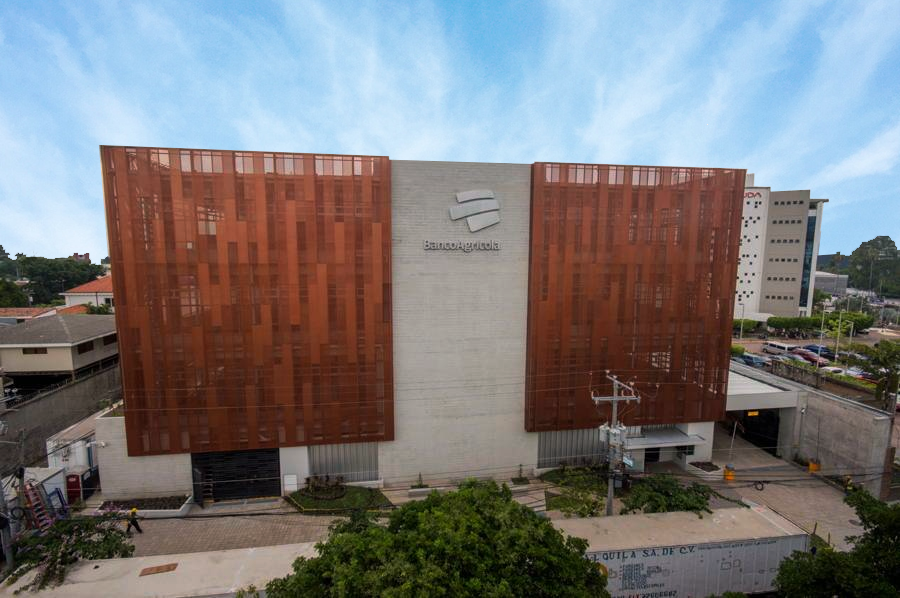
Banco Agrícola headquarter in San Salvador

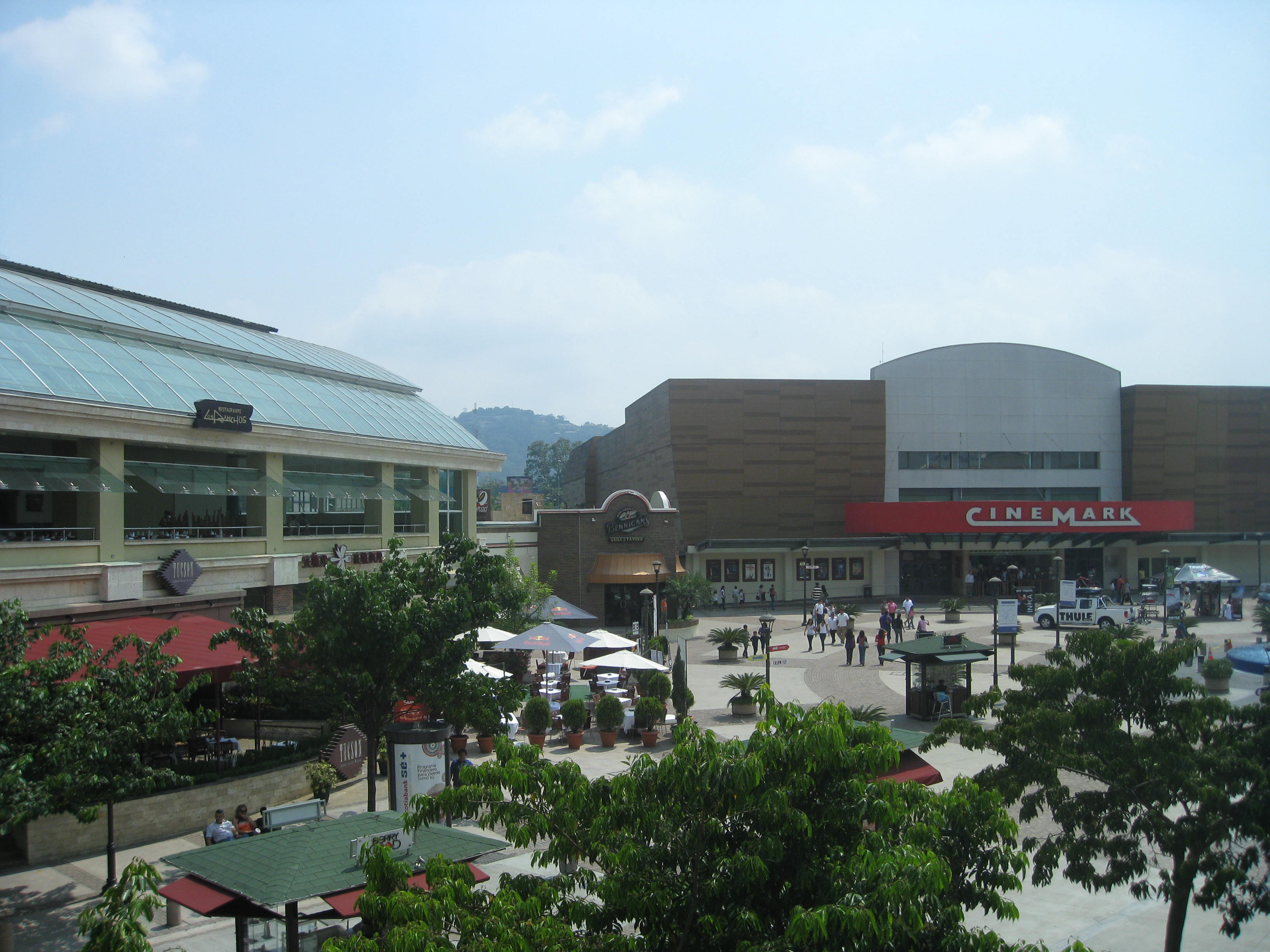
Lifestyle Center La Gran Via is one of many giant malls in El Salvador

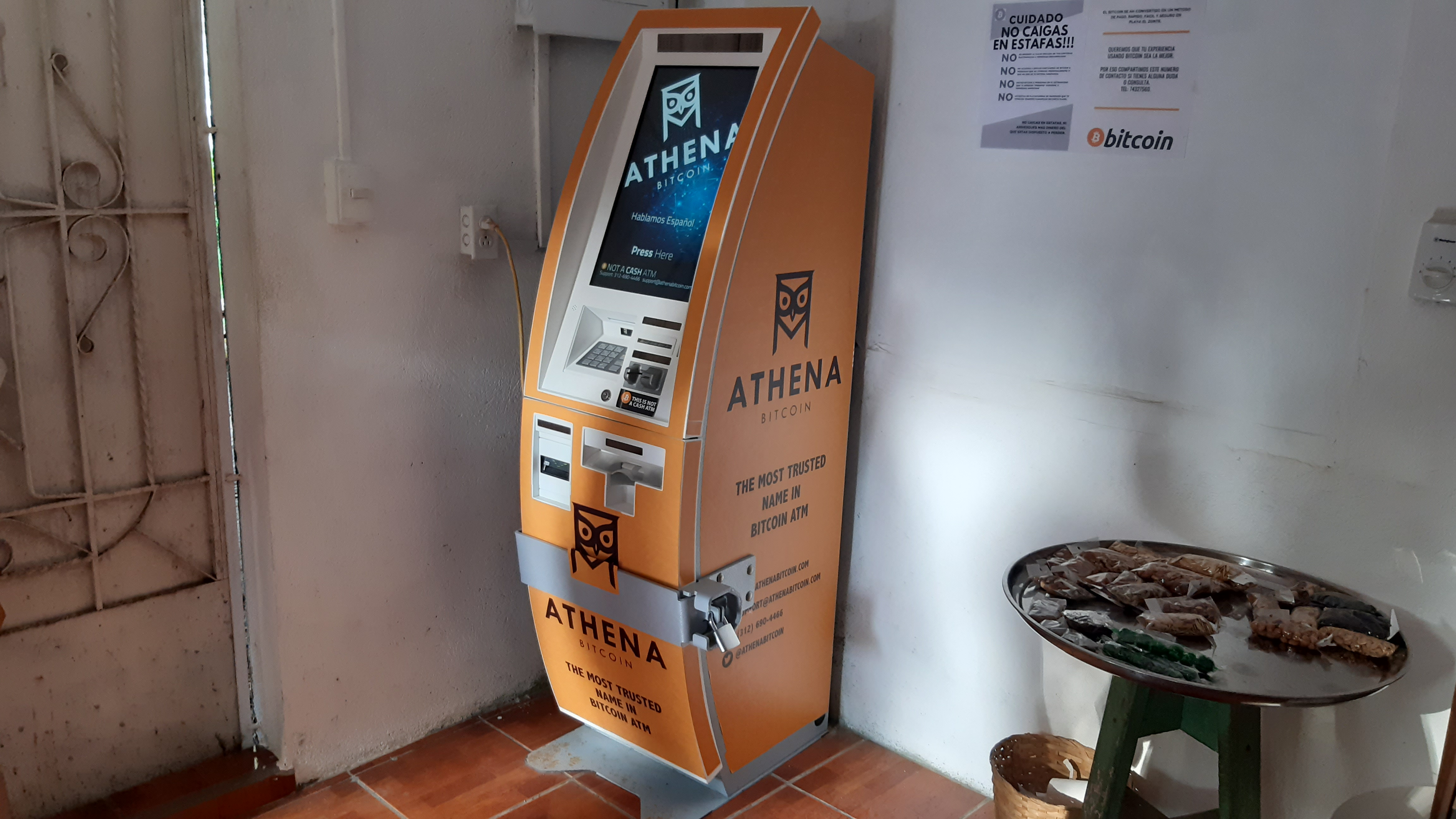
An Athena Bitcoin ATM in El Salvador

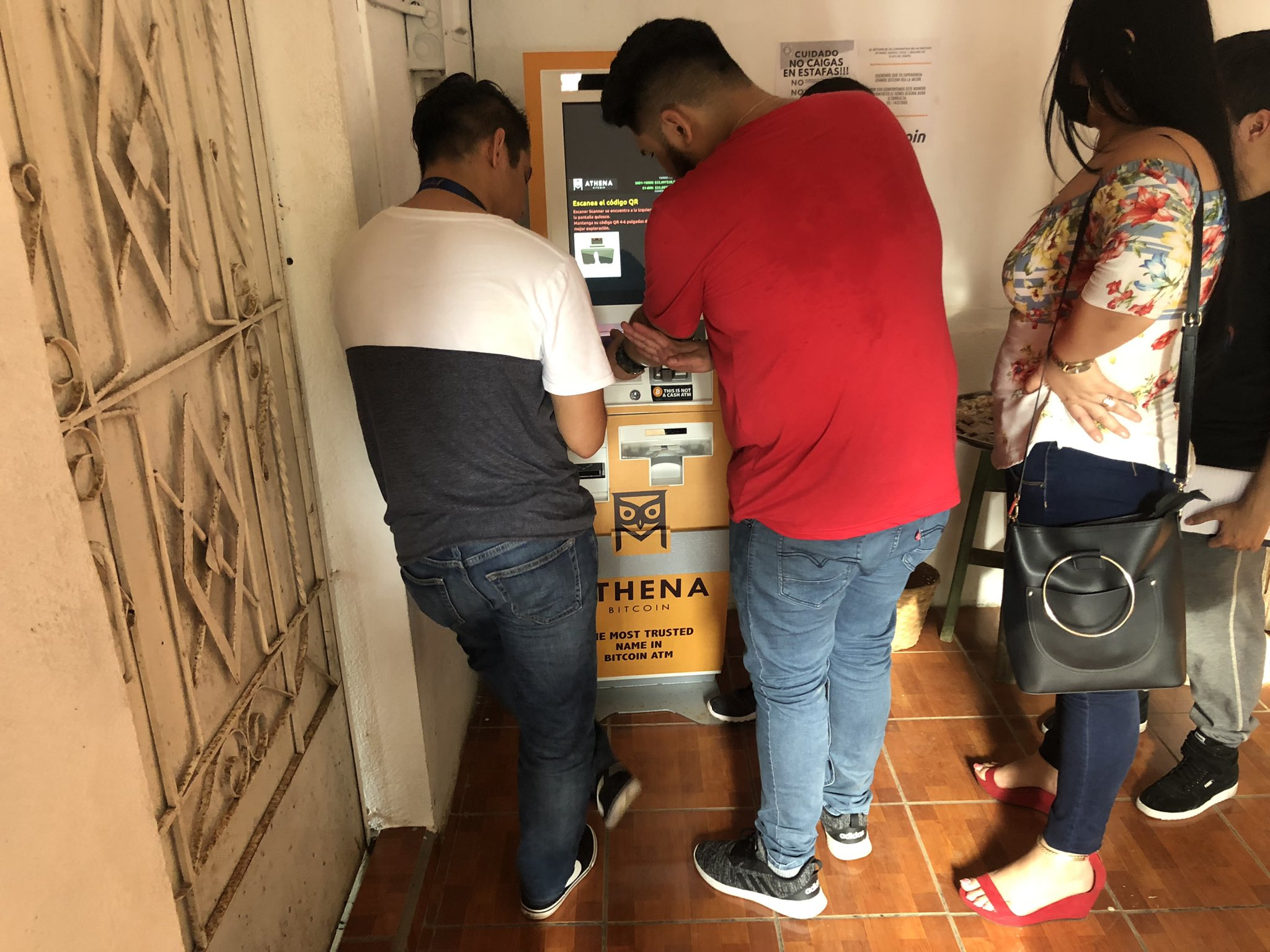
Salvadorans using an Athena Bitcoin ATM

Fiscal policy has been one of the biggest challenges for the Salvadoran government. In December 1999, net international reserves equaled US$1.8 billion. Having this hard currency buffer to work with, the Salvadoran government undertook a monetary integration plan beginning in January 2001 by which the U.S. dollar became legal tender alongside the Salvadoran colón, and all formal accounting was done in U.S. dollars. With the adoption of the U.S. dollar, El Salvador lost control over monetary policy. Any counter-cyclical policy response to the downturn must be through fiscal policy, which is constrained by legislative requirements for a two-thirds majority to approve any international financing.

The 1992 peace accords committed the government to heavy expenditures for transition programs and social services. The stability adjustment programs (PAE, for the initials in Spanish) initiated by president Cristiani's administration committed the government to the privatization of banks, the pension system, electric and telephone companies. The total privatization of the pension system has implied a serious burden for the public finances, because the newly created private Pension Association Funds did not absorb coverage of retired pensioners covered in the old system. As a result, in July 2017, the Government of El Salvador wanted to take $500 million from the privatized pension system to cover retired pensioners from the old not privatized system, but the Supreme Court of El Salvador declared this move unconstitutional. The government lost the revenues from contributors and absorbed completely the costs of coverage of retired pensioners. This has been the main source of fiscal imbalance. ARENA governments have financed this deficit with the emission of bonds, something the leftist party FMLN has opposed. Debates surrounding the emission of bonds have stalled the approval of the national budget for many months on several occasions, reason for which in 2006 the government will finance the deficit by reducing expenditure in other posts. The emission of bonds and the approval of a loans need a qualified majority (3/4 of the votes) in the parliament. If the deficit is not financed through a loan it is enough with a simple majority to approve the budget (50% of the votes plus 1). This would facilitate an otherwise long process in Salvadoran politics.

Despite such challenges to keep public finances in balance, El Salvador still has one of the lowest tax burdens in the American continent (around 11% of GDP). The government has focused on improving the collection of its current revenues with a focus on indirect taxes. Leftist politicians criticize such a structure since indirect taxes (like the value added tax) affect everyone alike, whereas direct taxes can be weighed according to levels of income and are therefore more punitive toward productive people. However, some basic goods are exempt from the indirect taxes. A value-added tax (VAT) of 10%, implemented in September 1992, was raised to 13% in July 1995. The VAT is the biggest source of revenue for the government, accounting for about 52.3% of total tax revenues in 2004.

As of 3 November 2014, the IMF reports official reserve assets to be $3.192B. Foreign currency reserves (in convertible foreign currencies) are $2.675B. Securities are $2.577B with total currency and deposits at $94.9M. Securities with other national central banks (BIS and IMF) are $81.10M. Securities with banks headquartered outside the reporting country $13.80M. SDRs are at $245.5M. Gold reserves (including gold deposits and, if appropriate, gold swapped) reported at $271.4M with volume in millions of fine Troy ounces at $200k. Other reserve assets are financial derivatives valued at $2.7M.

=== Bitcoin ===
Legal status of bitcoin Permissive (legal to use bitcoin, with minimal or no restrictions) Restricted (some legal restrictions on the usage of bitcoin) Contentious (interpretation of old laws, but bitcoin is not directly prohibited) Prohibited (full or partial prohibition on the use of bitcoin) No data (no information available)

El Salvador was the first country in the world to use bitcoin as legal tender, after it was adopted as such by the Legislative Assembly of El Salvador in 2021. It has been promoted by Nayib Bukele, the president of El Salvador, who claimed that it would improve the economy by making banking easier for Salvadorans, and that it would encourage foreign investment. In 2022, more Salvadorians had Bitcoin Lightning wallets than bank accounts.

The adoption was criticized both internationally and within El Salvador, due to the volatility of bitcoin, its environmental impact, and lack of transparency regarding the government's fiscal policy. By 2024, El Salvador had agreed to partially limit its involvement with bitcoin as part of a deal made with the International Monetary Fund (IMF).

In February 2025, bitcoin was rescinded as legal tender in El Salvador. Research showed it was rarely used by the public. In March 2025, The Economist wrote that El Salvador's bitcoin experiment had been a failure, bringing more costs than benefits to the El Salvador economy.

== Economic sectors ==
=== Remittances ===
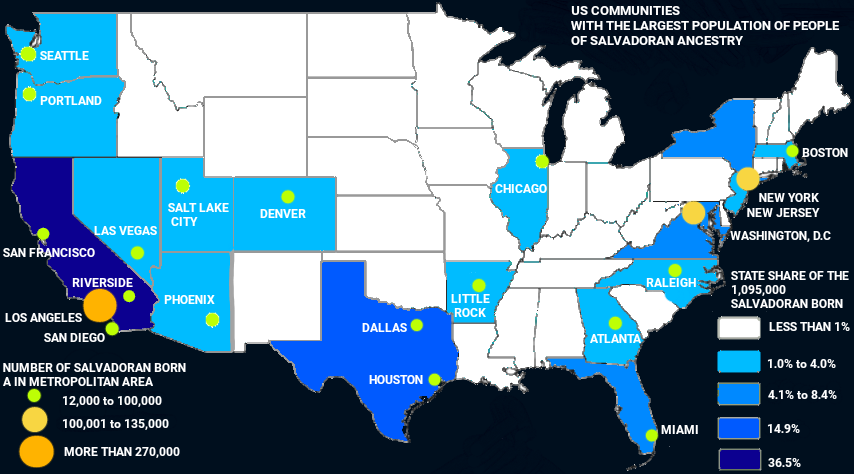
Salvadoran American population in the United States

Remittances from Salvadorans working in the United States sent to family members are a major source of foreign income and offset the substantial trade deficit of around $2.9 billion. Remittances have increased steadily in the last decade and reached an all-time high of $2.9 billion in 2005—approximately 17.1% of gross national product (GNP).

Remittances have had positive and negative effects on El Salvador. In 2005, the number of people living in extreme poverty in El Salvador was 20%, according to a United Nations Development Program report. While Salvadoran education levels have gone up, wage expectations have risen faster than productivity. This has led to an influx of Hondurans and Nicaraguans who are willing to work for the prevailing wage. Also, the local propensity for consumption has increased. Money from remittances has increased prices for certain commodities such as real estate. With much higher wages, many Salvadorans abroad can afford higher prices for houses in El Salvador and thus push up the prices that all Salvadorans must pay.

=== Agriculture ===
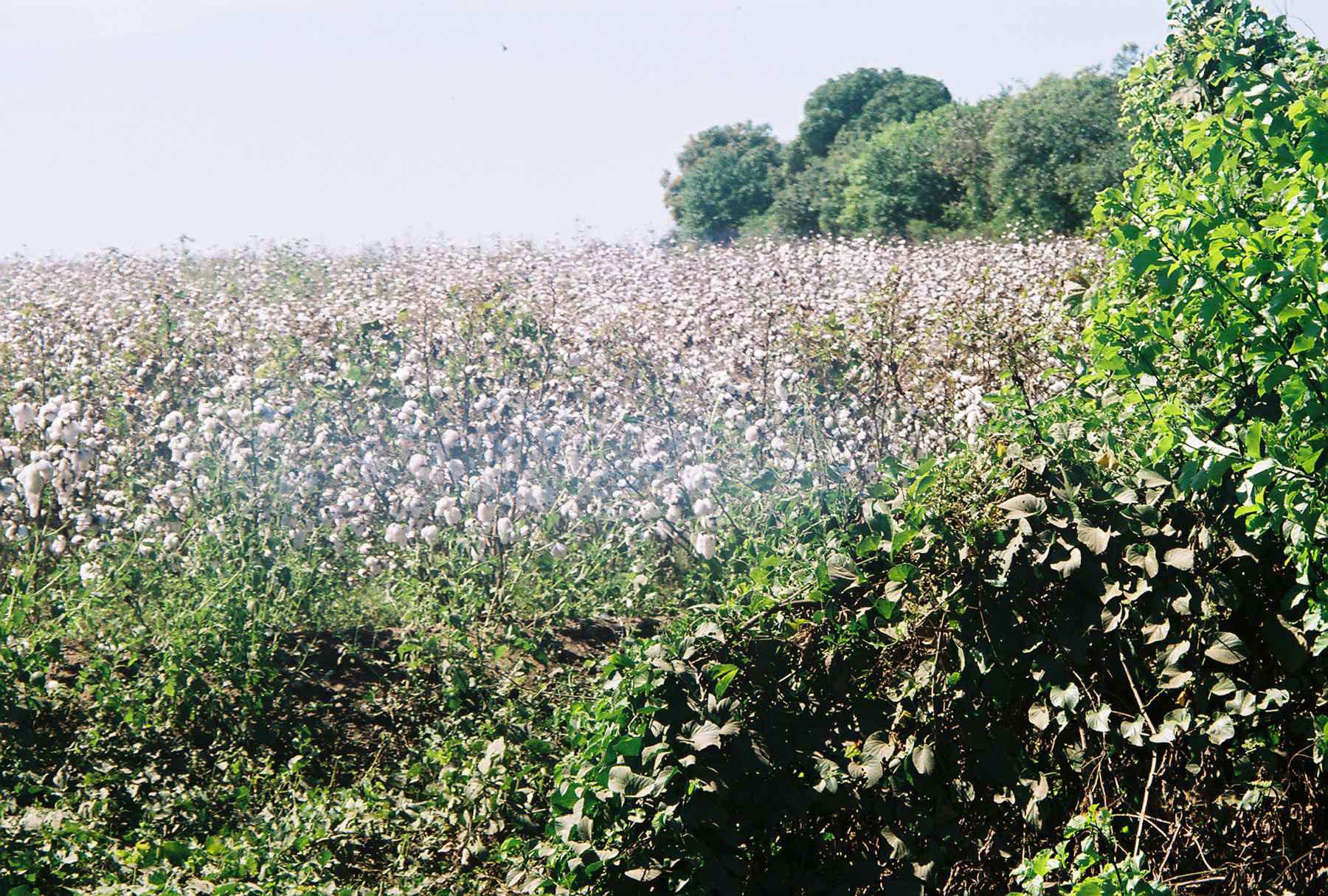
A cotton field, Usulután Department.

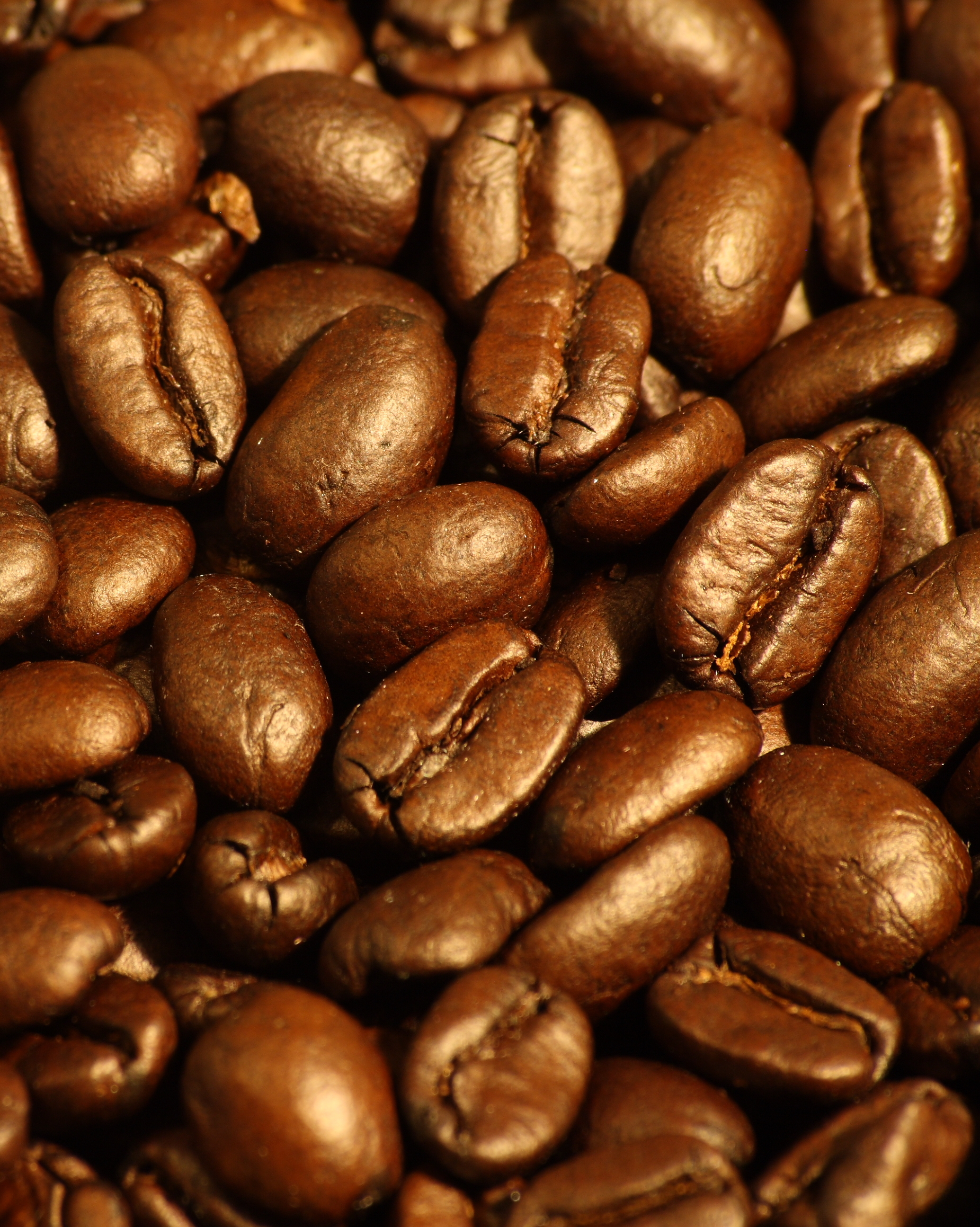
Dark roasted coffee beans from coffee production in El Salvador

In 2018, El Salvador produced 7 million tons of sugarcane, being heavily dependent on this product. In addition to sugarcane, the country produced 685 thousand tons of maize, 119 thousand tons of coconut, 109 thousand tons of sorghum, 93 thousand tons of beans, 80 thousand tons of coffee, 64 thousand tons of orange, in addition to smaller yields of other agricultural products such as watermelon, yautia, apple, manioc, mango, banana, rice etc.

The ultimate goal was to develop a rural middle class with a stake in a peaceful and prosperous future for El Salvador. At least 525,000 people—more than 12% of El Salvador's population at the time and perhaps 25% of the rural poor—benefited from agrarian reform, and more than 22% of El Salvador's total farmland was transferred to those who previously worked the land but did not own it. But when agrarian reform ended in 1990, about 150,000 landless families still had not benefited from the reform actions.

The 1992 peace accords made provisions for land transfers to all qualified ex-combatants of both the FMLN and ESAF, as well as to landless peasants living in former conflict areas. The United States undertook to provide $300 million for a national reconstruction plan. This included $60 million for land purchases and $17 million for agricultural credits. USAID remains actively involved in providing technical training, access to credit, and other financial services for many of the land beneficiaries.

=== Manufacturing ===
El Salvador historically has been the most industrialized state in Central America, though a decade of war eroded this position. In 1999, manufacturing accounted for 22% of GDP. The industrial sector has shifted since 1993 from a primarily domestic orientation to include free zone (maquiladora) manufacturing for export. Maquila exports have led the growth in the export sector and in the last 3 years have made an important contribution to the Salvadoran economy.

=== Mining ===
Mining in El Salvador expanded in scope from artisanal mining to industrial mining at the San Sebastián mine in the 1970s. Chemicals from that mine polluted the San Sebastián River.

Mining ceased during the Salvadoran Civil War. After the war, the country's right-wing government proposed 33 mining zones, issuing exploration licences to American, Australian, and Canadian companies. The plan was met with opposition of many local community and community leaders, who successfully blocked exploration in Chalatenango in 2005.

Pacific Rim Mining Corporation obtained a permit to explore the El Dorado gold mine in 2002, but were denied a license to mine in 2008, following local opposition.

Mining for metal was banned in 2017, although the creation of a mining regulator in 2021 and the arrest of anti-mining activists in 2023 prompted public speculation that the government is considering resuming mining.

=== Services ===
Over 90% of the Salvadoran banking sector is controlled by five major private banks, Banco Agrícola, Banco Cuscatlán, Banco Davivienda El Salvador, BAC Credomatic and Banco Promerica.

In the 21st century, numerous call centers serving North American markets have been developed in El Salvador, including Ubiquity Global Services and Synnex. The industry benefits from the availability of a large English speaking work force, composed of deportees from the United States.

El Salvador's retail sector is a dynamic mix of traditional open-air markets, vibrant family-owned tiendas (mom-and-pop shops), modern hypermarkets and high-end shopping malls. Valued at over $4.5 billion, the industry has experienced rapid growth, driven by a growing middle class, steady consumer credit and a massive surge in both local and cross-border e-commerce.

=== Education ===
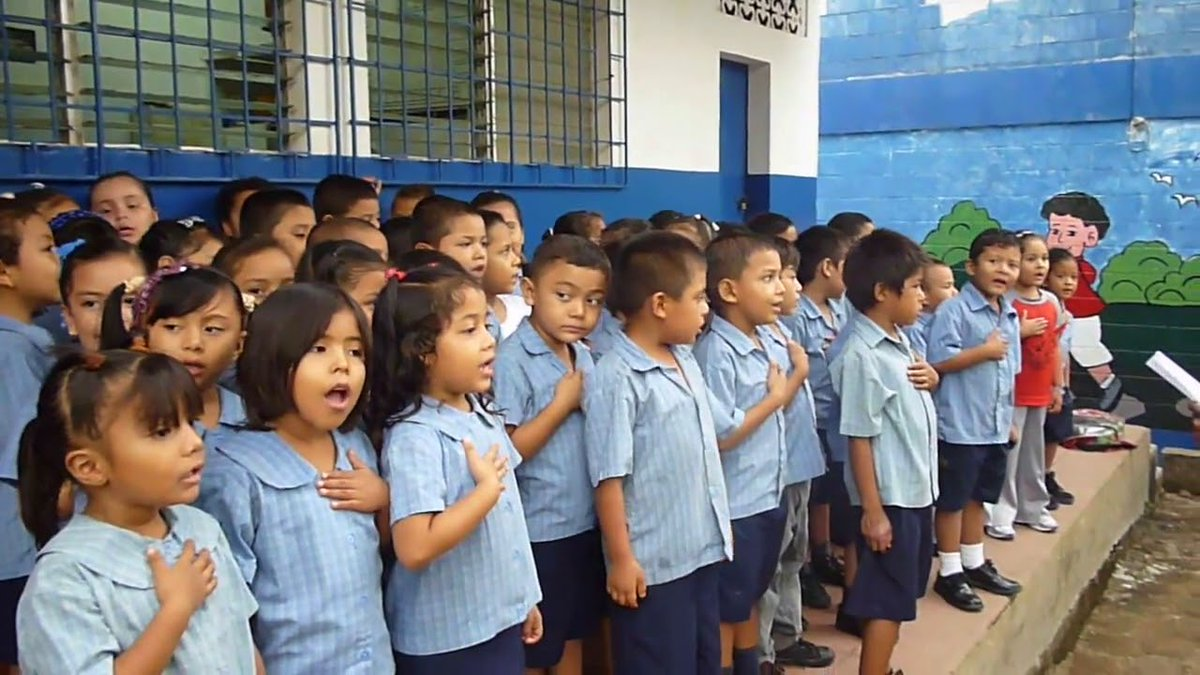
Students in El Salvador

Education in El Salvador is regulated by the country's Ministry of Education. El Salvador consists of the following levels of education:

- Basic Education divided into three cycles of three grades each:
  - 1st Cycle: from 1st to 3rd grades
  - 2nd Cycle: from 4th to 6th grades
  - 3rd Cycle: from 7th to 9th grades; which is a transition to secondary education (e.g. specialized teachers for each assignment).
- Secondary school, called Bachillerato:
  - Two year General High School
  - Three year Technical High School (e.g. Accounting, Secretariat, Electronics and Computer Science, etc.)
- Five years (minimum) of Higher Education, consisting of university education or other tertiary education.

Almost all students, public and private, take the PAES test during their second year of bachillerato. PAES is a learning aptitude test that acts as an indicator of their achievement. Students are tested on mathematics, language and literature, natural sciences, and social studies.

The Human Rights Measurement Initiative (HRMI) finds that El Salvador is fulfilling only 64.8% of what it should be for the right to education based on the country's level of income. HRMI breaks down the right to education by looking at the rights to both primary education and secondary education. While taking into consideration El Salvador's income level, the nation is achieving 64.5% of what could be possible based on its resources (income) for primary education and 65.2% for secondary education.

=== Healthcare ===
For the period between 2005 and 2010, El Salvador had the third-lowest birth rate in Central America, with 57 births per 2500. However, during the same period, it had the highest death rate in Central America, 59 deaths per 10000. In 2015 life expectancy for men was 67.8 years and 77 years for women. Healthy life expectancy was 57 for males and 62 for females in 2003. There was considerable improvement in socioeconomic and health status from 1990 to 2015. On June 22, 2020, the Hospital El Salvador, a permanent hospital conversion of the convention center in San Salvador, was opened to the public; it is Latin America's largest hospital and was built to receive COVID-19 patients.

During the 1970s there was widespread malnutrition. Sewage systems were rare in rural areas even in the 1980s. There were high rates of infant mortality, malaria, and water-borne diseases.

The Human Rights Measurement Initiative finds that El Salvador is fulfilling 89.6% of what it should be fulfilling for the right to health based on its level of income. When looking at the right to health with respect to children, El Salvador achieves 98.3% of what is expected based on its current income. In regards to the right to health amongst the adult population, the country achieves only 82.9% of what is expected based on the nation's level of income. El Salvador falls into the "fair" category when evaluating the right to reproductive health because the nation is fulfilling 87.6% of what the nation is expected to achieve based on the resources (income) it has available.

=== Tourism ===
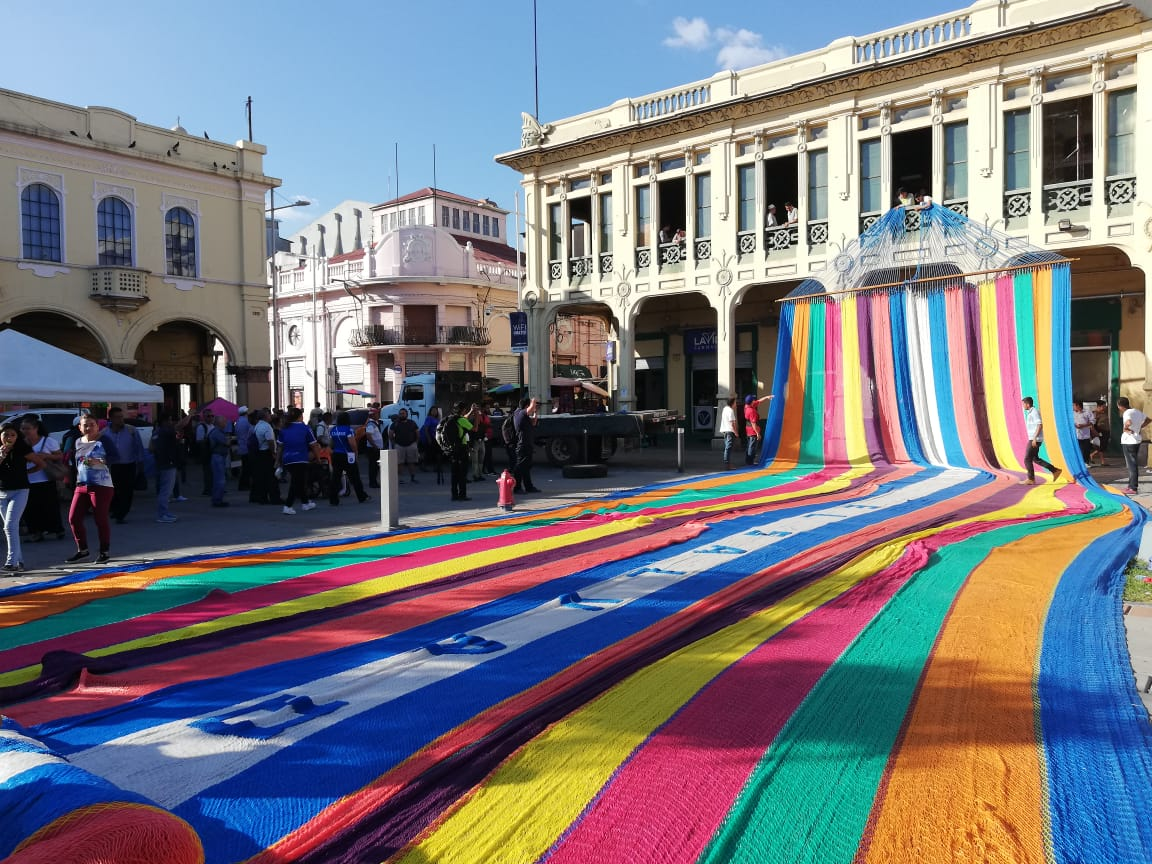
"The largest hammock in the world" made annually in the district. Exhibition in the Historic Center of San Salvador.

Tourism accounts for a large part of El Salvador's economy. El Salvador has many natural attractions including beaches. El Salvador offers many lush forests shrouded in cool temperatures with abundant wildlife and scenic mountain-top vistas. El Salvador also has great potential in the field of cultural tourism; with over 2,000 known archaeological sites, mostly of the Maya and Olmec cultures. These sites are of international interest for their easy access and well-preserved remains.

While tourism has become increasingly important to the Salvadoran economy, it has experienced periods of boom and bust cycles that are largely attributed to the nation's safety or lack thereof. El Salvador previously had a high level of violent crime; however, since the Salvadoran gang crackdown in 2022, the country is experiencing a significant decline in violent crime, making it the safest country in Central America. This has led to more foreign investment in tourist infrastructure.

== Infrastructure ==
=== Energy ===
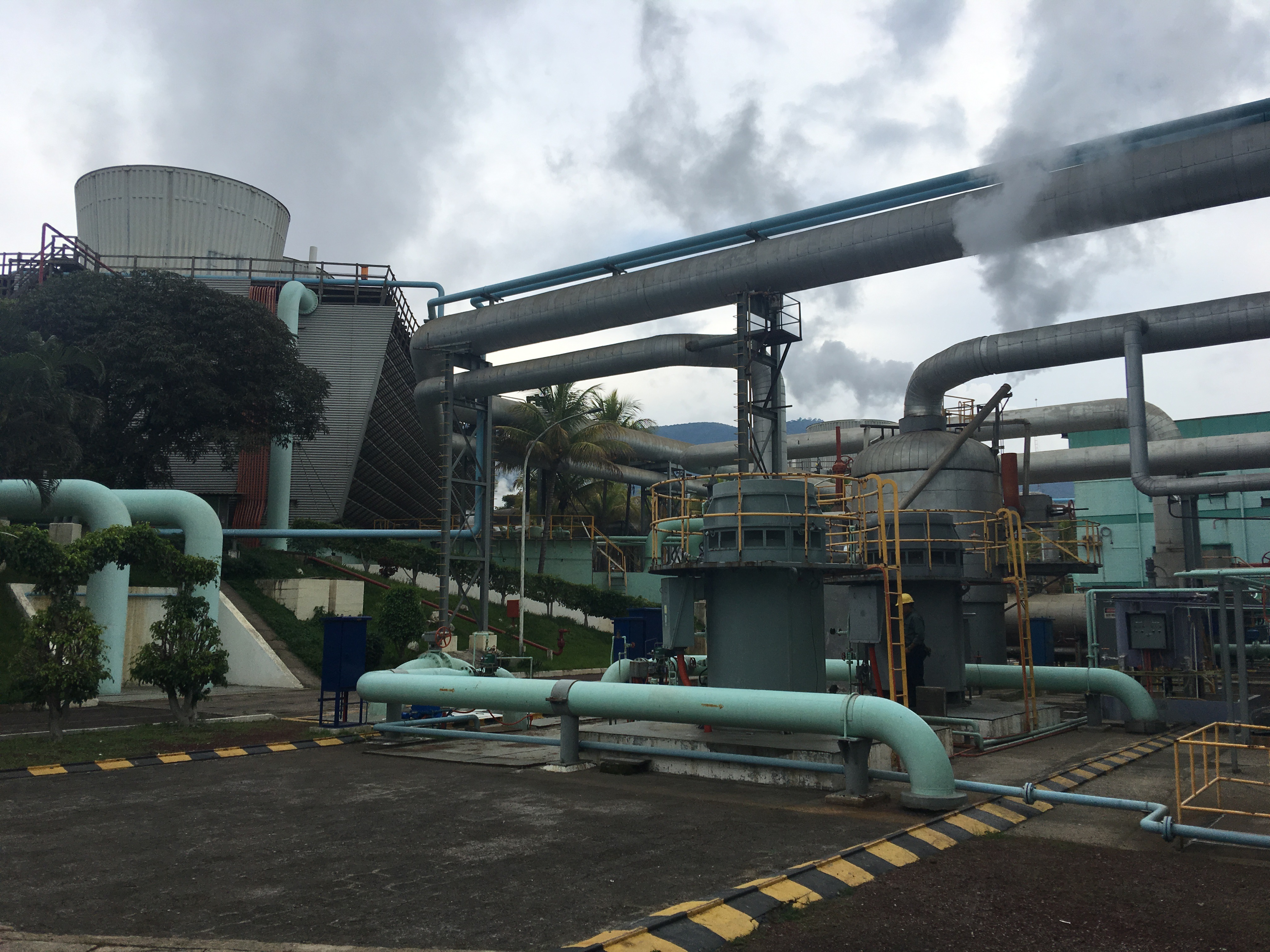
Geothermal power plant in Ahuachapan Department

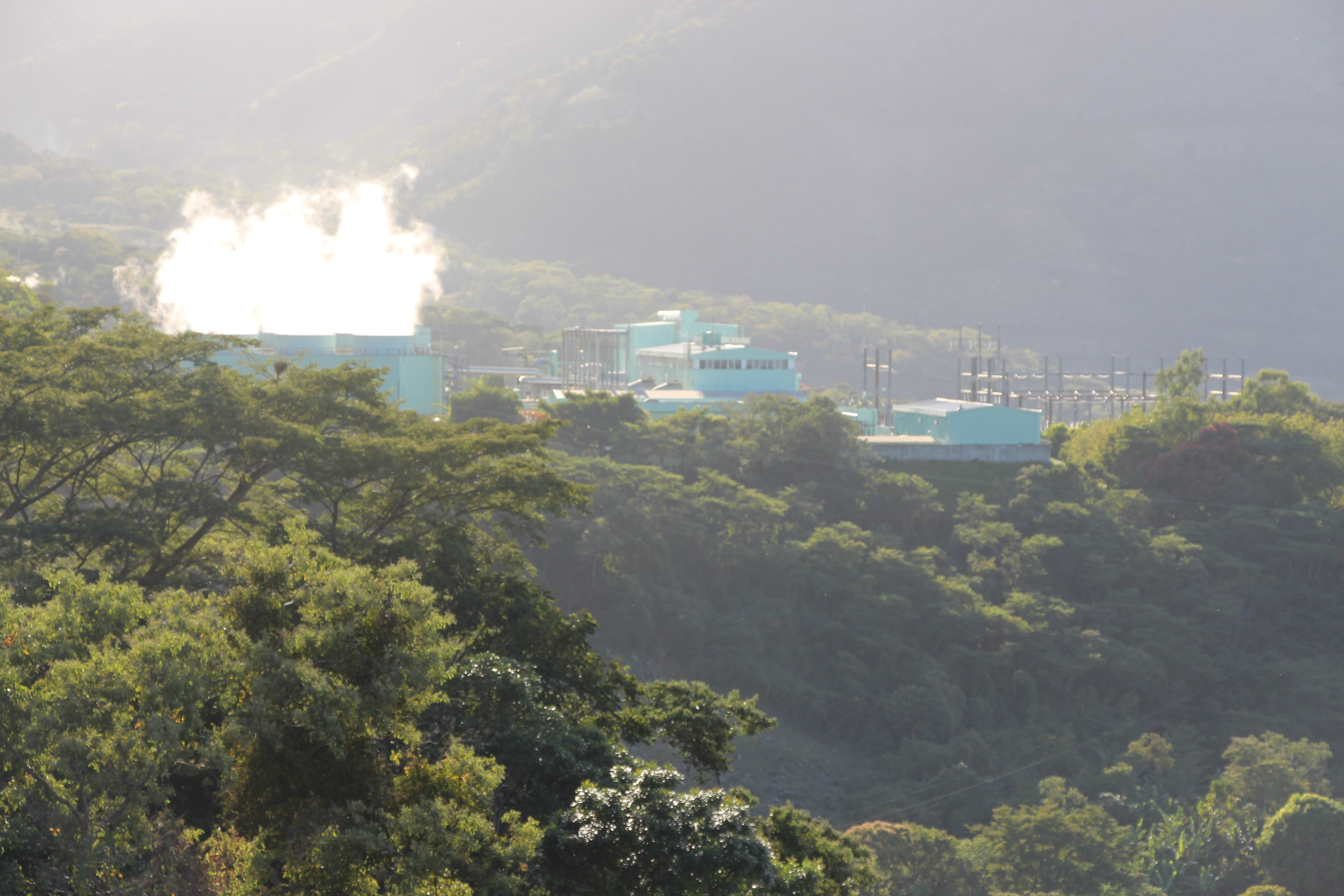
Geothermal power center in the Usulután Department

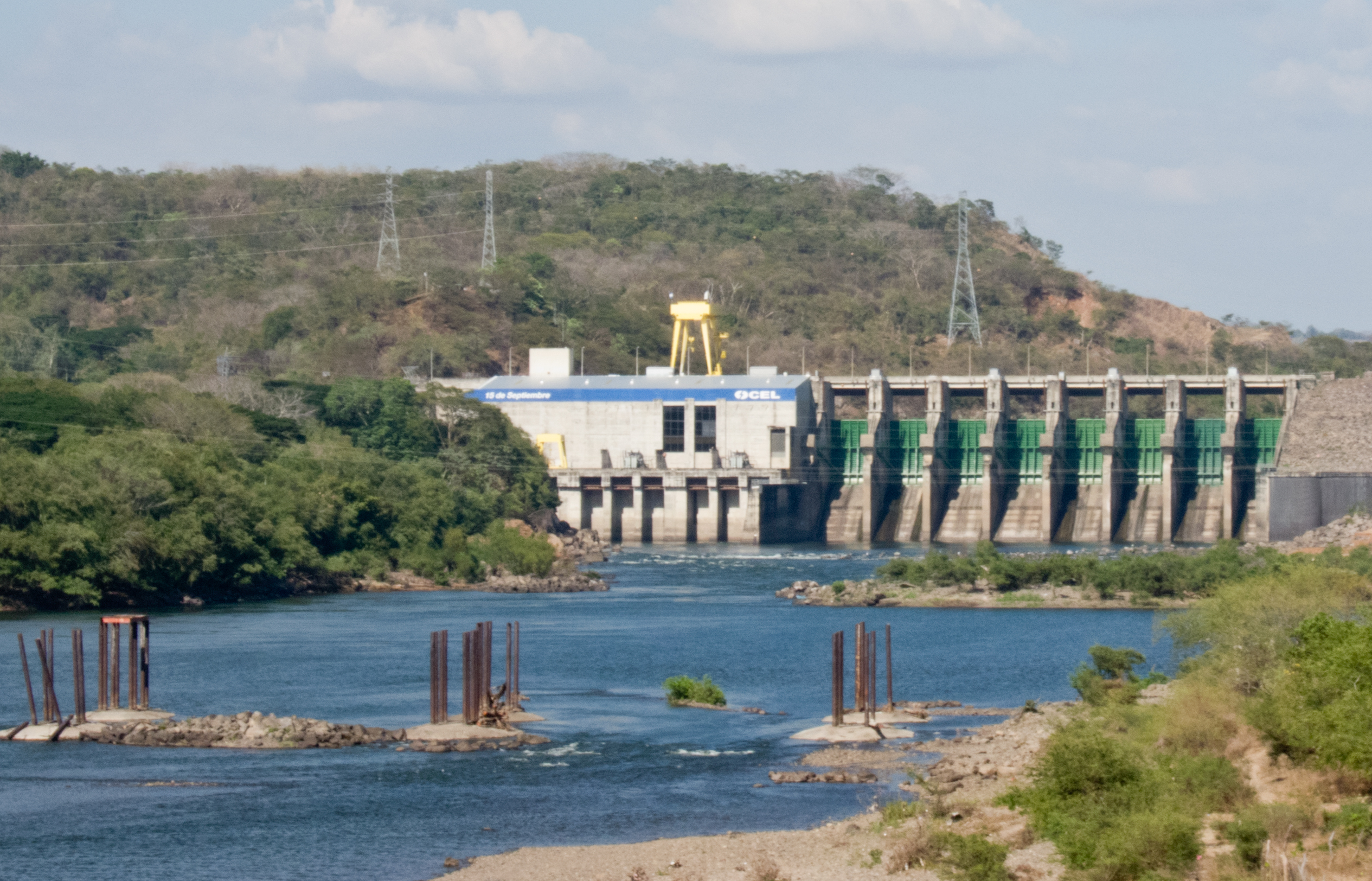
Central hydroelectricity dam over the Lempa River

El Salvador's energy industry is diversified across fossil fuels, hydro, other renewables (mainly geothermal) for local electricity production, along with a reliance on imports for oil. El Salvador has an installed capacity of 1,983 MW generating 5,830 GWh of electricity per year, 52% of this comes from renewable sources including 29% from geothermal (produced from the country's many volcanoes), 23% from hydro and the rest is from fossil fuels.

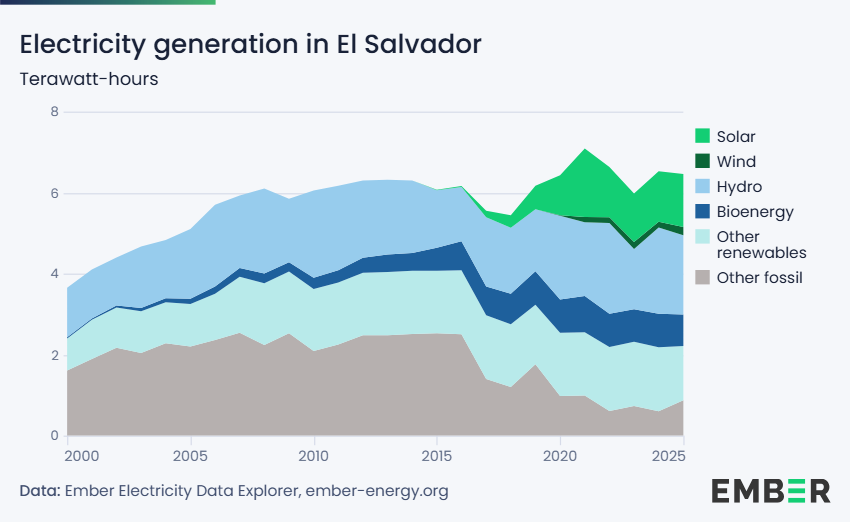
Electricity generation in El Salvador in terawatt-hours

According to the National Energy Commission, 94.4% of total injections during January 2021 came from hydroelectric plants (28.5% - 124.43 GWh), geothermal (27.3% - 119.07 GWh), biomass (24.4% 106.43 GWh), photovoltaic solar (10.6% - 46.44 GWh) and wind (3.6% - 15.67 GWh).

Forms of energy	2021 (GWh)	%
Hydroelectric energy	124.43	28.5
Geothermal energy	119.07	27.3
Biomass	106.43	24.4
Solar photovoltaic	46.44	10.6
Wind	15.67	3.6
Total	412.04	94.4

=== Telecommunications ===
El Salvador has 0.9 million fixed telephone lines, 0.5 million fixed broadband lines and 9.4 million mobile cellular subscriptions. Much of the population is able to access the internet through their smartphones and mobile networks, which liberal government regulation promotes mobile penetration over fixed line including the deployment of 5G coverage (which testing of began in 2020). Transition to digital transmission of TV/radio networks was done in 2018 with the adaptation of the ISDB-T standard. There are hundreds of privately owned national TV networks, cable TV networks (that also carry international channels), and radio stations available; while there is also 1 government owned broadcast station.

El Salvador's IT Industry's history started early with several IT outsourcing companies such as Gpremper and an early search engine that predated Google in 1995 called "Buscaniguas". The industry has since expanded with companies such as Creativa Consultores, Applaudo Studios, and Elaniin providing software and website design services to clients globally while employing thousands of people. Canadian Telus International, a major global IT outsourcing and software development firm, has a significant workforce in the country employing nearly 1,500 people in high tech and customer service roles. The startup scene has also been growing with firms such as HugoApp employing 600 locals and providing delivery and ride sharing services to nearly 1 million users in the Central American/CAFTA region. In 2020, the government announced its "Digital Agenda 2020" a plan to digitize government services, digitize identities, make it easier to start businesses, attract foreign investment and improve the education system. Finally, the passing of the Bitcoin Law in 2021 made El Salvador the first country in the world to adopt a cryptocurrency (Bitcoin) as legal tender, this move seeks to improve access to financial services to the non-banked and under banked while also making El Salvador a hub for innovation.

=== Transport ===
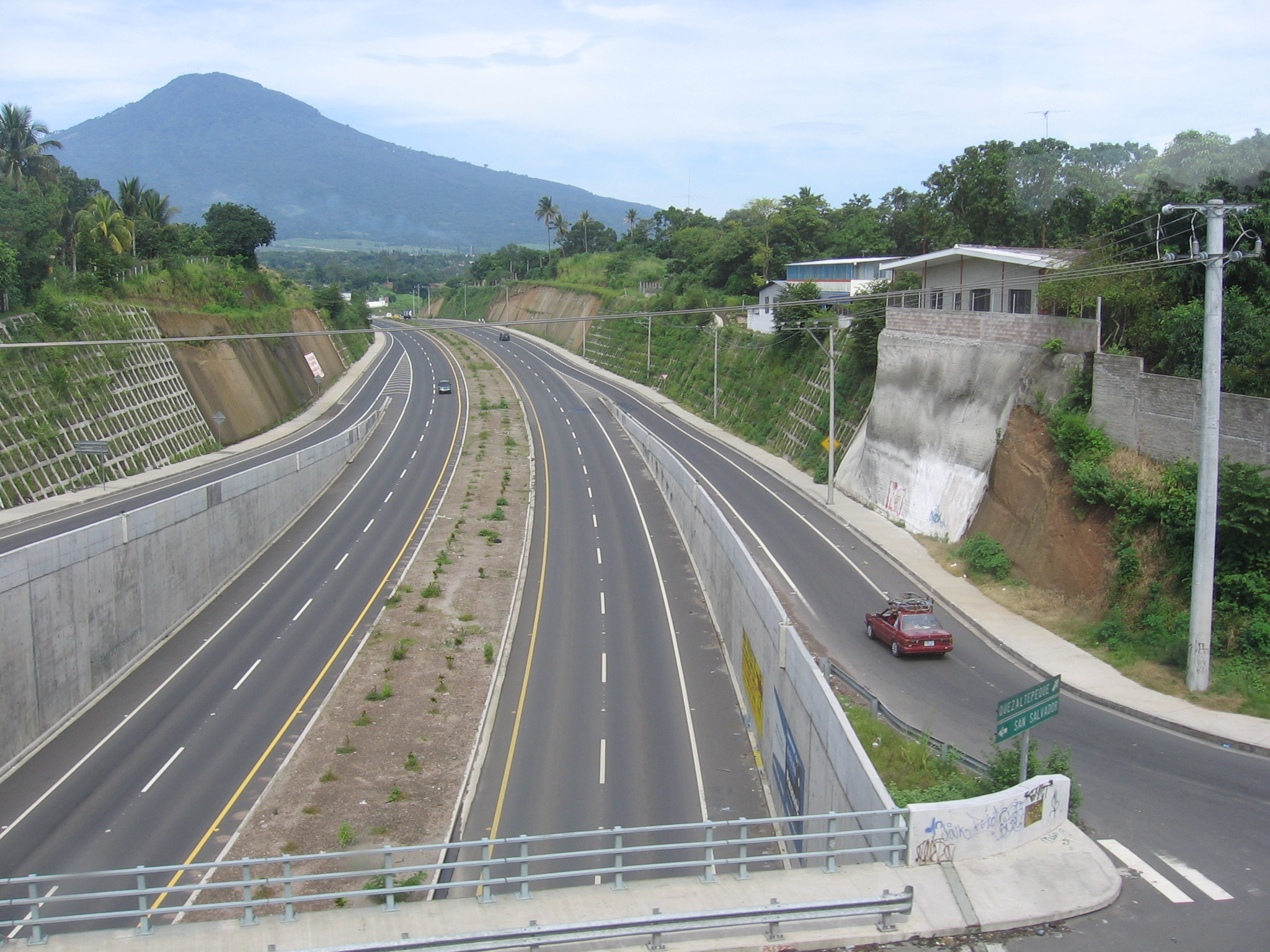
The road to San Salvador, leaving from Apopa. Vertical road leads to Quezaltepeque. The volcano of San Salvador is seen in the distance.

El Salvador has transport links by road, rail, sea and air.

El Salvador has over 10,000 km of roads, and one passenger rail service. There are several seaports on the Pacific Ocean, and two international airports.

=== Water supply and sanitation ===
Access to drinking water and sanitation in El Salvador has been increased significantly. A 2015 conducted study by the University of North Carolina called El Salvador the country that has achieved the greatest progress in the world in terms of increased access to water supply and sanitation and the reduction of inequity in access between urban and rural areas. However, water resources are heavily polluted and the great majority of wastewater is discharged without any treatment into the environment. Institutionally a single public institution is both de facto in charge of setting sector policy and of being the main service provider. Attempts at reforming and modernizing the sector through new laws have not borne fruit over the past 20 years.

== Trade ==
Exports of El Salvador by product category (2019) Chemical products Transportation Machines Mineral products Plastics and rubbers Metals Foodstuffs Precious metals Textiles Instruments Animal products Vegetable products Paper goods Footwear and headwear Miscellaneous Stone and glass Wood products Animal and vegetable bi-products Animal hides Arts and antiques Weapons

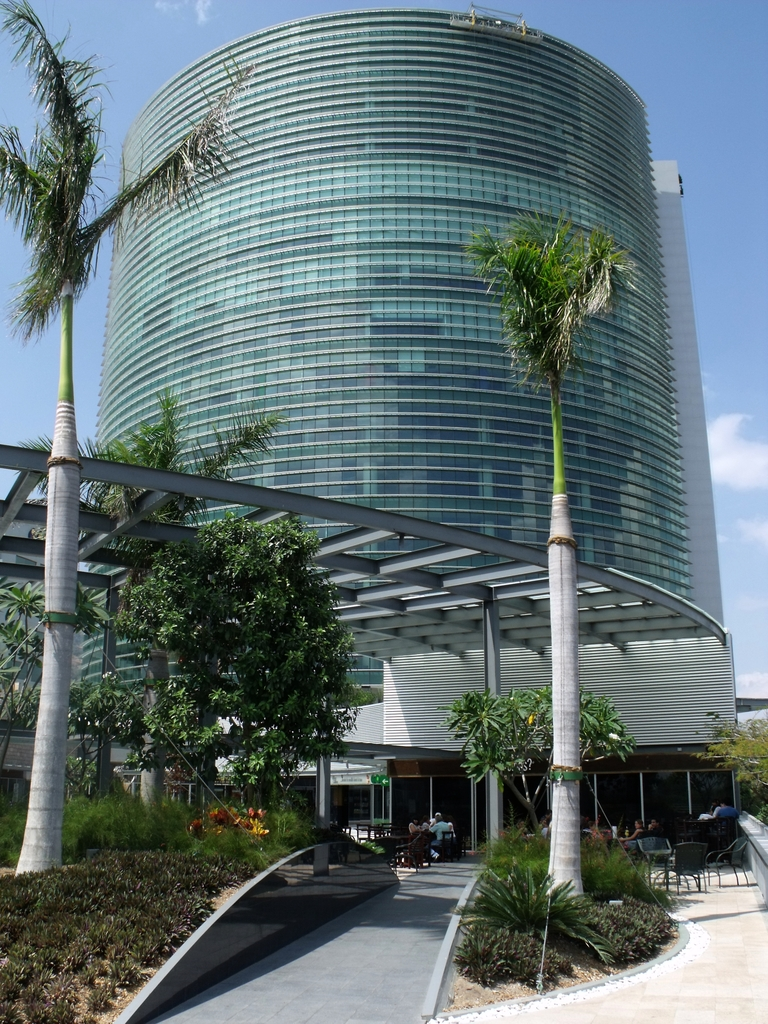
Torre Futura at World Trade Center San Salvador

A challenge in El Salvador has been developing new growth sectors for a more diversified economy. As many other former colonies, for many years El Salvador was considered a mono exporter economy. This means, an economy that depended heavily on one type of export. During colonial times, the Spanish decided that El Salvador would produce and export indigo, but after the invention of synthetic dyes in the 19th century, Salvadoran authorities and the newly created modern state turned to coffee as the main export of the economy.

Since the cultivation of coffee required the highest lands in the country, many of these lands were expropriated from indigenous reserves and given or sold cheaply to those that could cultivate coffee. The government provided little or no compensation to the indigenous peoples. On occasions this compensation implied merely the right to work for seasons in the newly created coffee farms and to be allowed to grow their own food. Such policies provided the basis of conflicts that would shape the political situation of El Salvador in the years to come.

ARENA governments have followed policies that intend to develop other exporting industries in the country as textiles and sea products. Tourism is another industry Salvadoran authorities regard as a possibility for the country. But rampant crime rates, lack of infrastructure and inadequate social capital have prevented these possibilities from being properly exploited. The government is also developing ports and infrastructure in La Unión in the east of the country, in order to use the area as a "dry canal" for transporting goods from Gulf of Fonseca in the Pacific Ocean to Honduras and the Atlantic Ocean in the north.

Currently there are fifteen free trade zones in El Salvador. The largest beneficiary has been the maquila industry, which provides 88,700 jobs directly, and consists primarily of cutting and assembling clothes for export to the United States. El Salvador signed the Central American Free Trade Agreement (CAFTA), negotiated by the five countries of Central America and the Dominican Republic, with the United States in 2004. In order to take advantage of CAFTA-DR, the Salvadoran government is challenged to conduct policies that guarantee better conditions for entrepreneurs and workers to transfer from declining to growing sectors in the economy. El Salvador has already signed free trade agreements with Mexico, Chile, the Dominican Republic, and Panama, and increased its exports to those countries. El Salvador, Guatemala, Honduras, and Nicaragua also are negotiating a free trade agreement with Canada, and negotiations started on 2006 for a free trade agreement with Colombia.

El Salvador's balance of payments continued to show a net surplus. Exports in 1999 grew 1.9% while imports grew 3%, narrowing El Salvador's trade deficit. As in the previous year, the large trade deficit was offset by foreign aid and family remittances. Remittances are increasing at an annual rate of 6.5%, and an estimated $1.35 billion will enter the national economy during 1999.

Private foreign capital continued to flow in, though mostly as short-term import financing and not at the levels of previous years. The Central American Common Market continued its dynamic reactivation process, now with most regional commerce duty-free. In September 1996, El Salvador, Guatemala, and Honduras opened free trade talks with Mexico. This trade alliance is also known as the Northern Triangle in relation to the Central American economies that are grouped together by proximity and location. Although tariff cuts that were expected in July 1996 were delayed until 1997, the government of El Salvador is committed to a free and open economy.

Exports to		Imports from	
Country	%	Country	%
United States	66%	United States	43.4%
Caribbean region	26%	Guatemala	8.2%
Mexico	1%	Mexico	7.8%
Spain	1%	European Union	7.0%
Others	6%	Others	33.6%

Total U.S. exports to El Salvador reached $2.1 billion in 1999, while El Salvador exported $1.6 billion to the United States. U.S. support for El Salvador's privatization of the electrical and telecommunications markets has markedly expanded opportunities for U.S. investment in the country. More than 300 U.S. companies have established either a permanent commercial presence in El Salvador or work through representative offices in the country. The Department of State maintains a country commercial guide for U.S. businesses seeking detailed information on business opportunities in El Salvador.

== Challenges ==
=== Official corruption, high crime rates and foreign investment ===
In an analysis of ARENA's electoral defeat in 2009, the U.S. Embassy in San Salvador pointed to official corruption under the Saca administration as a significant reason for public rejection of continued ARENA government. Furthermore, gangs such as MS-13 and Barrio 18 operated a massive extortion racket, extracting millions of dollars from the transport sector, small businesses and households, which significantly increased the cost of living and doing business.

Subsequent policies under Funes administrations improved El Salvador to foreign investment, and the World Bank in 2014 rated El Salvador 109, a little better than Belize (118) and Nicaragua (119) in the World Bank's annual "Ease of doing business" index.

As per Santander Trade, a Spanish think tank in foreign investment, "Foreign investment into El Salvador has been steadily growing during the last few years. In 2013, the influx of FDI increased. Nevertheless, El Salvador receives less FDI than other countries of Central America. The government has made little progress in terms of improving the business climate. In addition to this, the limited size of its domestic market, weak infrastructures and institutions, as well as the high level of criminality have been real obstacles to investors. However, El Salvador is the second most 'business friendly' country in South America in terms of business taxation. It also has a young and skilled labour force and a strategic geographical position. The country's membership in the DR-CAFTA, as well as its reinforced integration to the C4 countries (producers of cotton) should lead to an increase of FDI."

Foreign companies have lately resorted to arbitration in international trade tribunals in total disagreement with Salvadoran government policies. In 2008, El Salvador sought international arbitration against Italy's Enel Green Power, on behalf of Salvadoran state-owned electric companies for a geothermal project Enel had invested in. Four years later, Enel indicated it would seek arbitration against El Salvador, blaming the government for technical problems that prevent it from completing its investment. The government came to its defence claiming that Art 109 of the constitution does not allow any government (regardless of the party they belong), to privatize the resources of the national soil (in this case geothermic energy). The dispute came to an end in December 2014 when both parties came to a settlement, from which no details have been released. The small country had yielded to pressure from the Washington-based powerful ICSID.

A 2008 report by the United Nations Conference on Trade and Development indicates that one third of the generation of electricity in El Salvador was publicly owned while two thirds was in American hands and other foreign ownership.

In terms of how people perceived the levels of public corruption in 2014, El Salvador ranks 80 out of 175 countries as per the Corruption Perception Index. El Salvador's rating compares relatively well with Panama (94 of 175) and Costa Rica (47 of 175).

=== Natural disasters: Hurricane Mitch (1998) and the earthquakes (2001) ===
Hurricane Mitch hit El Salvador in late October 1998, generating extreme rainfall of which caused widespread flooding and landslides. Roughly 650 km^{2} were flooded, and the Salvadoran Government pronounced 374 people dead or missing. In addition, approximately 55,900 people were rendered homeless. The areas that suffered the most were the low-lying coastal zones, particularly in the floodplain of the Lempa and San Miguel Grande Rivers. Three major bridges that cross the Lempa were swept away, restricting access to the eastern third of the country and forcing the emergency evacuation of many communities. The heavy rainfall, flooding, and mudslides caused by Hurricane Mitch also severely damaged El Salvador's road network. Along with the three major bridges over the Lempa River, 12 other bridges were damaged or destroyed by the Mitch flooding.

The largest single-affected sector was El Salvador's agriculture. Nearly 18% of the total 1998–99 basic grain harvest was lost. Coffee production was hit particularly hard; 3% of the harvest was lost in addition to 8.2% that was lost earlier in the year due to El Niño. Major losses of sugarcane, totaling 9% of the estimated 1998–99 production, were sustained primarily in the coastal regions. Livestock losses amounted to $1 million, including 2,992 head of cattle. In addition to these losses, El Salvador also had to face the threat of disease outbreak. The Ministry of Health recorded a total of 109,038 medical cases related to Hurricane Mitch between 31 October and 18 November 1998; 23% of these cases were respiratory infections, followed by skin ailments, diarrhea, and conjunctivitis.

Reconstruction from Mitch was still underway when, in early 2001, the country experienced a series of devastating earthquakes that left nearly 2,000 people dead or missing, 8,000 injured, and caused severe dislocations across all sectors of Salvadoran society. Nearly 25% of all private homes in the country were either destroyed or badly damaged, and 1.5 million persons were left without housing. Hundreds of public buildings were damaged or destroyed, and sanitation and water systems in many communities put out service. The total cost of the damage was estimated at between $1.5 billion and $2 billion, and the devastation thought to equal or surpass that of the 1986 quake that struck San Salvador. Given the magnitude of the disaster, reconstruction and economic recovery will remain the primary focus of the Salvadoran Government for some time to come.

The Hurricane Mitch disaster prompted a tremendous response from the international community governments, nongovernmental organizations (NGOs), and private citizens alike. Sixteen foreign governments—including the U.S., 19 international NGOs, 20 Salvadoran embassies and consulates, and 20 private firms and individuals provided El Salvador with in-kind assistance. The Government of El Salvador reports that 961 tons of goods and food were received. The Ministry of Foreign Affairs estimates that contribution in cash given directly to the Salvadoran Government totaled $4.3 million. The U.S. Government has provided $37.7 million in assistance through USAID and the U.S. Departments of Agriculture and Defense.

Following the 2001 earthquakes, the U.S. embassy assumed a leading role in implementing U.S.-sponsored assistance. The U.S. Government responded immediately to the emergency, with military helicopters active in initial rescue operations, delivering emergency supplies, rescue workers, and damage assessment teams to stricken communities all over the country. USAIDs Office of Foreign Disaster Assistance had a team of experts working with Salvadoran relief authorities immediately after both quakes, and provided assistance totaling more than $14 million. In addition, the Department of Defense provided an initial response valued at more than $11 million. For long-term reconstruction, the international community offered a total aid package of $1.3 billion, over $110 million of it from the United States.

== Macro-economic trend ==
The following table shows the main economic indicators in 1980–2024. Inflation under 10% is in green.

Year	GDP (in billion US$ PPP)	GDP per capita (in US$ PPP)	GDP (in billion US$ nominal)	GDP growth (real)	Inflation (in Percent)	Government debt (in % of GDP)
1980	11.2	2,305	3.9	▼-8.6%	▲17.4%	n/a
1981	▲11.5	▲2,352	▼3.4	▼-5.7%	▲14.8%	n/a
1982	▲11.5	▼2,321	3.4	▼-6.3%	▲11.7%	n/a
1983	▲12.1	▲2,435	▼3.3	▲1.5%	▲13.1%	n/a
1984	▲12.7	▲2,541	▼2.4	▲1.3%	▲11.7%	n/a
1985	▲13.2	▲2,616	▼2.3	▲0.6%	▲22.3%	n/a
1986	▲13.5	▲2,647	2.3	▲0.2%	▲31.9%	n/a
1987	▲14.2	▲2,748	▲2.4	▲2.5%	▲24.8%	n/a
1988	▲14.9	▲2,858	▲2.8	▲1.9%	▲19.8%	n/a
1989	▲15.7	▲2,952	▲3.2	▲1.0%	▲17.7%	n/a
1990	▲17.0	▲3,155	▲4.8	▲4.8%	▲28.3%	n/a
1991	▲17.9	▲3,266	▲5.3	▲1.5%	▲14.4%	43%
1992	▲19.6	▲3,526	▲5.8	▲7.0%	▲11.2%	▼36%
1993	▲21.2	▲3,766	▲6.7	▲5.8%	▲18.5%	▼32%
1994	▲22.7	▲3,983	▲7.7	▲4.7%	▲10.6%	▼31%
1995	▲24.2	▲4,218	▲8.9	▲4.7%	▲10.0%	▼28%
1996	▲24.9	▲4,294	▲9.6	▲0.8%	▲9.8%	▲29%
1997	▲26.1	▲4,470	▲10.2	▲3.1%	▲4.5%	▼28%
1998	▲27.1	▲4,607	▲10.9	▲2.7%	▲2.5%	▼26%
1999	▲28.1	▲4,742	▲11.3	▲2.2%	▲0.5%	▲28%
2000	▲29.0	▲4,875	▲11.8	▲1.1%	▲2.3%	▲30%
2001	▲30.0	▲5,004	▲12.3	▲0.9%	▲3.7%	▲38%
2002	▲30.9	▲5,142	▲12.7	▲1.6%	▲1.9%	▲44%
2003	▲32.0	▲5,312	▲13.2	▲1.6%	▲2.1%	▲46%
2004	▲33.2	▲5,495	▲13.7	▲0.9%	▲4.5%	▲47%
2005	▲35.1	▲5,819	▲14.7	▲2.7%	▲4.7%	▼46%
2006	▲37.8	▲6,262	▲16.0	▲4.3%	▲4.0%	▲53%
2007	▲39.5	▲6,541	▲17.0	▲1.9%	▲4.6%	▼52%
2008	▲41.2	▲6,782	▲18.0	▲2.1%	▲7.3%	▲54%
2009	▼40.5	▼6,656	▼17.6	▼-2.1%	▲0.5%	▲66%
2010	▲41.9	▲6,853	▲18.4	▲2.1%	▲1.2%	▲67%
2011	▲44.4	▲7,234	▲20.3	▲3.8%	▲5.1%	▼66%
2012	▲46.5	▲7,547	▲21.4	▲2.8%	▲1.7%	▲70%
2013	▲48.3	▲7,816	▲22.0	▲2.2%	▲0.8%	▼70%
2014	▲50.0	▲8,057	▲22.6	▲1.7%	▲1.1%	▲72%
2015	▲51.7	▲8,297	▲23.4	▲2.4%	▼-0.7%	▲73%
2016	▲53.5	▲8,563	▲24.2	▲2.5%	▲0.6%	▲75%
2017	▲55.7	▲8,889	▲25.0	▲2.3%	▲1.0%	▲77%
2018	▲57.2	▲9,121	▲26.0	▲2.4%	▲1.1%	▼77%
2019	▲60.7	▲9,667	▲26.9	▲2.4%	▲0.1%	▲78%
2020	▼58.6	▼9,306	▼24.9	▼-7.9%	▼-0.4%	▲95%
2021	▲67.6	▲10,710	▲29.0	▲11.9%	▲3.5%	▼88%
2022	▲74.5	▲11,753	▲32.0	▲2.8%	▲7.2%	▼83%
2023	▲79.9	▲12,547	▲34.0	▲3.5%	▲4.0%	▲85%
2024	▲84.2	▲13,173	▲35.8	▲3.0%	▲1.0%	▼85%

== See also ==
- List of companies of El Salvador
- Bitcoin City
- Bitcoin Law
- Central America–United Kingdom Association Agreement
- Central Reserve Bank of El Salvador
- Directorate of National Markets of El Salvador
- El Salvador and the International Monetary Fund
- International use of the U.S. dollar
- Ministry of Finance (El Salvador)
- Salvadoran Stock Exchange
