= Río Grande de San Miguel =

River in El Salvador

- Location of mouth

Location
- Country: El Salvador
- Department: Usulután

Physical characteristics
- Mouth
  - location: Pacific Ocean
  - coordinates: 13°14′00″N 88°22′00″W

Río Grande de San Miguel is a river in southern El Salvador, Central America.

It flows into the Pacific Ocean in the Usulután Department, at 13.2333333°N 88.3666667°W.
