= Health in El Salvador =

Aspect of life in El Salvador

For the period between 2005 and 2010, El Salvador had the third-lowest birth rate in Central America, with 57 births per 2500. However, during the same period, it had the highest death rate in Central America, 59 deaths per 10000. In 2015 life expectancy for men was 67.8 years and 77 years for women. Healthy life expectancy was 57 for males and 62 for females in 2003. There was considerable improvement in socioeconomic and health status from 1990 to 2015. On June 22, 2020, the Hospital El Salvador, a permanent hospital conversion of the convention center in San Salvador, was opened to the public; it is Latin America's largest hospital and was built to receive COVID-19 patients.

During the 1970s there was widespread malnutrition. Sewage systems were rare in rural areas even in the 1980s. There were high rates of infant mortality, malaria, and water-borne diseases.

The Human Rights Measurement Initiative finds that El Salvador is fulfilling 89.6% of what it should be fulfilling for the right to health based on its level of income. When looking at the right to health with respect to children, El Salvador achieves 98.3% of what is expected based on its current income. In regards to the right to health amongst the adult population, the country achieves only 82.9% of what is expected based on the nation's level of income. El Salvador falls into the "fair" category when evaluating the right to reproductive health because the nation is fulfilling 87.6% of what the nation is expected to achieve based on the resources (income) it has available.

== Healthcare ==
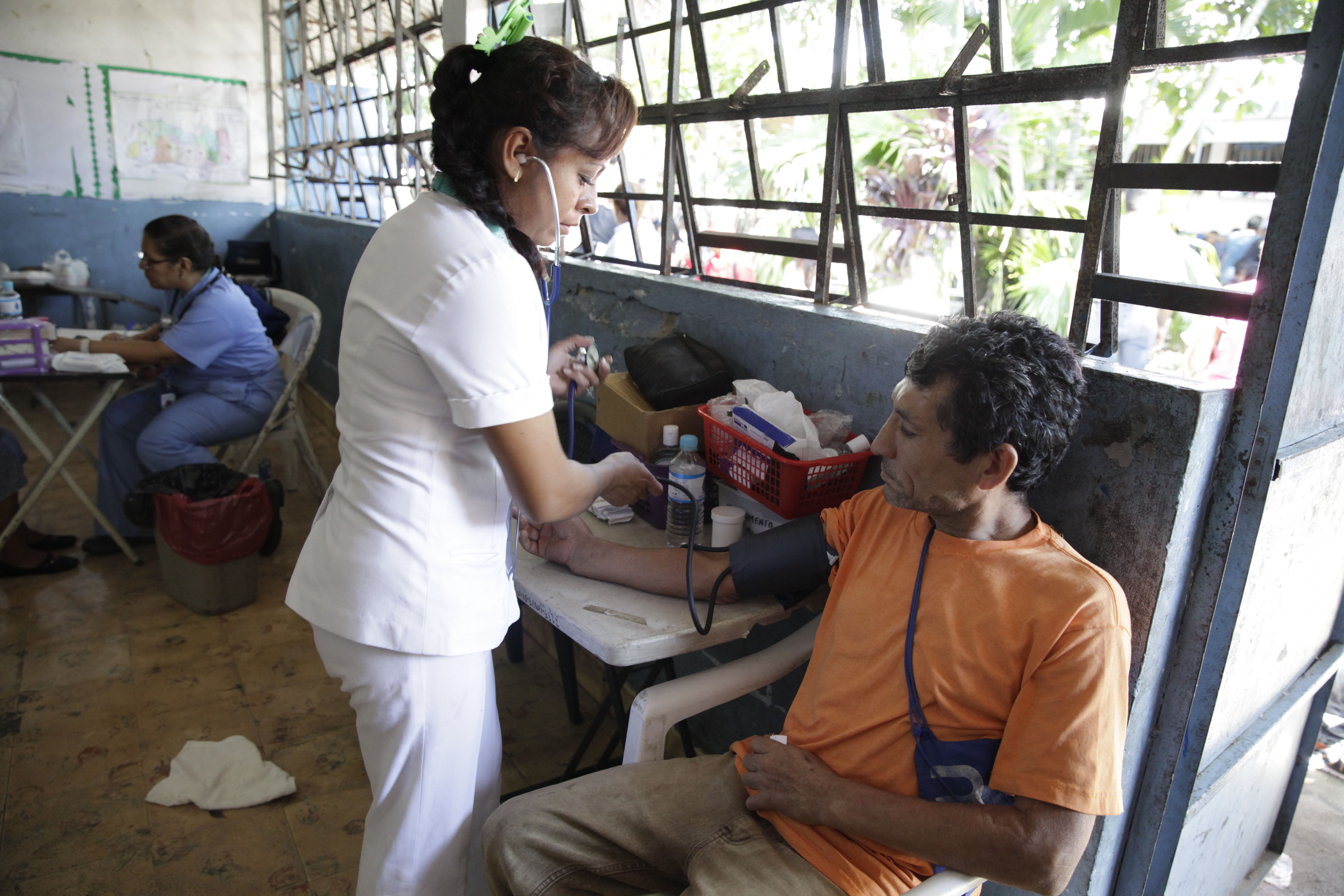
Medical consultation at the Festival for Good Living in Ciudad Delgado

The public healthcare system consists of

- Ministry of Health which provides free health services to 79.5% of the population
- Salvadoran Institute for Social Security, which provides health insurance for 18.4% of the population
- Teacher’s Welfare
- Military Health
- Higher Council for Public Health
- Salvadoran Institute for the Rehabilitation of Disabled Persons

In 1984 there were ten general hospitals and twelve health centers in the country. The Medical School of the National University was closed in 1980. There are now 30 public hospitals in El Salvador, plus various primary care facilities and 27 basic health care systems. Before 2009 a “voluntary” donation was demanded to access a public hospital or clinic. Clinics staffed by Community Health Teams have been established in the rural areas. Although services are supposed to be a free, a shortage of funds means that people may have to pay for supplies. Emergency services are very basic. The private health sector offers care in medical facilities concentrated in urban areas.

=== Hospitals ===
- Hospital El Salvador
- Hospital Nacional Rosales
- Hospital Nacional de Niños Benjamin Bloom (Pediatrics)
- Hospital Nacional de la Mujer (Gynecology & Obstetrics)
- Hospital Militar
- Hospital de Diagnóstico y Emergencia
- Hospital San Francisco
- Hospital Centro Ginecológico
