= Centro Financiero Gigante =

- Towers Telefonicas
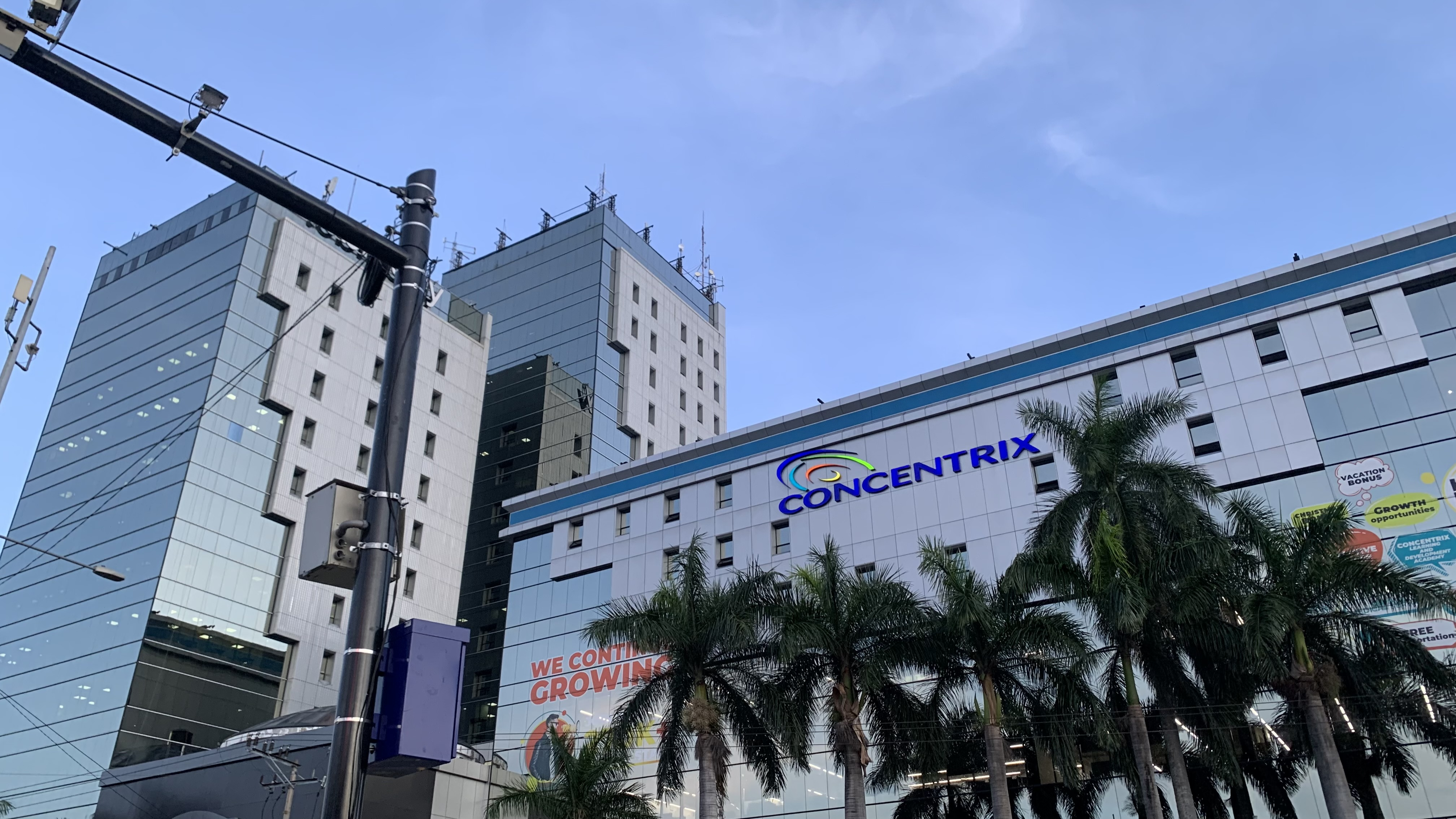
- Interactive map of the Centro Financiero Gigante area

General information
- Status: Completed
- Location: San Salvador; El Salvador
- Coordinates: 13.7002°N 89.2224°W
- Construction started: 1998
- Completed: 1999
- Owner: Centro Financiero Gigante
- Operator: Centro Financiero Gigante

Height
- Roof: 70 m (230 ft)

Technical details
- Floor count: A = 14, B = 19, C = 12, D = 10, E = 7
- Lifts/elevators: 12

Design and construction
- Architects: Cefinco, S. A. de C.V.
- Structural engineer: Cefinco, S. A. de C.V.
- Main contractor: Group

Centro Financiero Gigante (CFG) is a complex of office buildings located in San Salvador, El Salvador. It has five towers: July 1, one 10, another 12, another 14 and the highest 19 floors, the tallest tower measures 70 m (230 ft).

It is a phased project that began with the construction of the first two towers. After several years increased the number of buildings and has become one of the most buoyant complexes in San Salvador. Distribution of the towers:

== Details ==
Tower "A" is home to the telephone company Ubiquity.

Tower "B" (the highest) is owned by the Spanish company Tech America.

Tower "C" is owned by Ubiquity.

Tower "D" is occupied by the U.S. company CONCENTRIX.

Tower "E" is the headquarters of Walmart in El Salvador.

There are several Call Centers and Nearshore Operations located in this complex, including Ubiquity Global Services and Tech Americas USA. The Canadian and Israeli embassies are also located in the towers.
