= Hospital El Salvador =

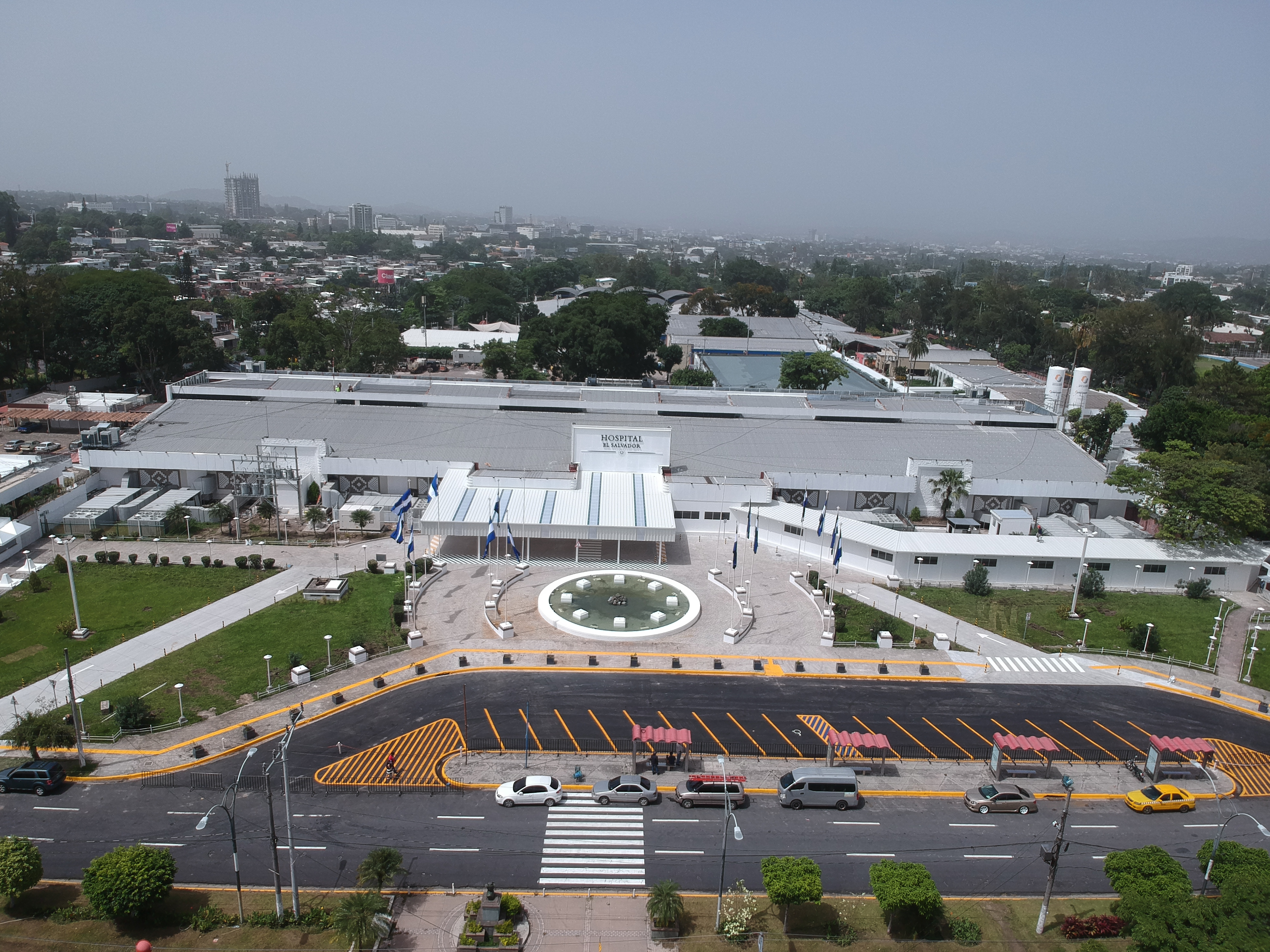

Geography
- Location: Salón Centro Americano, Avenida de la Revolucion 222, San Salvador, El Salvador
- Coordinates: 13°41′16″N 89°14′14″W

Organisation
- Type: Specialist

Services
- Beds: 400 (phase 1); 2,000 (phase 3)
- Speciality: COVID-19

History
- Opened: 21 June 2020

Links
- Website: covid19.gob.sv
- Lists: Hospitals in El Salvador

The Hospital El Salvador is a major hospital in San Salvador, El Salvador, which was planned to be the largest hospital in Latin America. The first phase was constructed between March and June 2020 as a conversion of the International Fair and Convention Center (Centro Internacional de Ferias y Convenciones, CIFCO) and formed part of El Salvador's response to the COVID-19 pandemic, exclusively receiving COVID-19 patients. Originally intended to be temporary, it was announced in June 2020 that the hospital conversion would be made permanent. In its first phase, the hospital has 400 available beds, a number which was expected to increase to 2,000 total beds upon completion of phase 3 of construction. However, phase 3 was not opened as a hospital and instead served as a vaccination facility. With the decline of the pandemic, the facility has been announced as the home for a new medical school and also houses offices for the Salvadoran health ministry.

== History ==
=== Conversion and construction ===
On 14 March 2020, President Nayib Bukele announced that a temporary hospital would be constructed in the CIFCO building, the country's main convention center. At the time, there were no reported COVID-19 cases in El Salvador, but Bukele warned of a potential "collapse" of the health system when cases did arrive. The Salvadorean transparency court, the Corte de Cuentas de El Salvador, recommended in April that the new hospital be made permanent; the court's president floated the idea of moving the convention center to other facilities. During construction, two workers of the Ministry of Public Works and Transportation tested positive for the virus. Personnel worked in three shifts to accelerate work.

The facility was inaugurated by the president on 22 June, at which time he announced the hospital conversion would be permanent because of the large investment made. Also at that time, the hospital was named the "Hospital El Salvador", representing the saving of lives that was hoped would take place there. The inauguration event was closed to journalists, and on multiple occasions officials denied newspaper photographers access to the site. US$25 million was spent on the first phase of the conversion of the former convention center, with the entire facility costing $75 million. Covering 36,000 square metres (390,000 ft^{2}), the facility features a blood bank, morgue, and radiology area, among other amenities. At the same time the hospital opened, the government began hiring to fill medical and administrative positions. Prior to the pandemic, there were just 30 intensive care unit (ICU) beds in all of El Salvador; surge capacity had brought that number to 157 by the time the hospital opened.

The University of El Salvador issued a press release upon the facility's inauguration, calling for the hospital to eventually become that university's medical school. Since the opening, the transparency court has noted that the health ministry has not allowed auditors to access key areas, such as the morgue, and journalists have not been allowed access to verify that the former convention center has the necessary infrastructure to serve as a hospital. In March 2021, the transparency court alerted to the existence of 63 anomalies in the construction process, including an initial lack of wastewater treatment facilities.

Work on the third and final phase—consisting of entirely new construction—was reported to be slow-moving in October, two months after its planned completion; the government projected it would be in operation by January 2021, though construction work was still ongoing in early March and in early April; despite claims by the Minister of Public Works that it was finished at that time, workers could still be seen on the property. The third phase opened on April 13 and was used as a mass vaccination site.

An article published in The Lancet in December 2020 highlighted the hospital; however, the independent portal Salud con Lupa revealed that the article—in the journal's opinion section—was paid for by the government, which contracted with a consultant, Magdalena Serpa, to promote the facility. An April 2021 letter to The Lancet questioned several aspects of the hospital's design. A report in November 2021 alleged that the claimed architect of the hospital had not finished his architecture degree.

=== Post-pandemic usage ===
As a result of declining COVID-19 cases, in April and May 2022, many doctors and nurses were transferred from the Hospital El Salvador to other medical facilities. Also in April, the government proposed converting the hospital into a specialty facility dealing with complex cases; labor unions in the Ministry of Health have noted a lack of transparency or communication with staff. The COVID-19 vaccination center closed in August 2022. By May 2023, health minister Francisco Alabi reported that there were no patients hospitalized with COVID-19 at the facility.

With the pandemic's decline, other health ministry functions have moved into the hospital building, including offices for the Ministry of Health's technology team. In September 2022, the government announced the creation of a specialty medical school at the hospital.

== Facilities ==
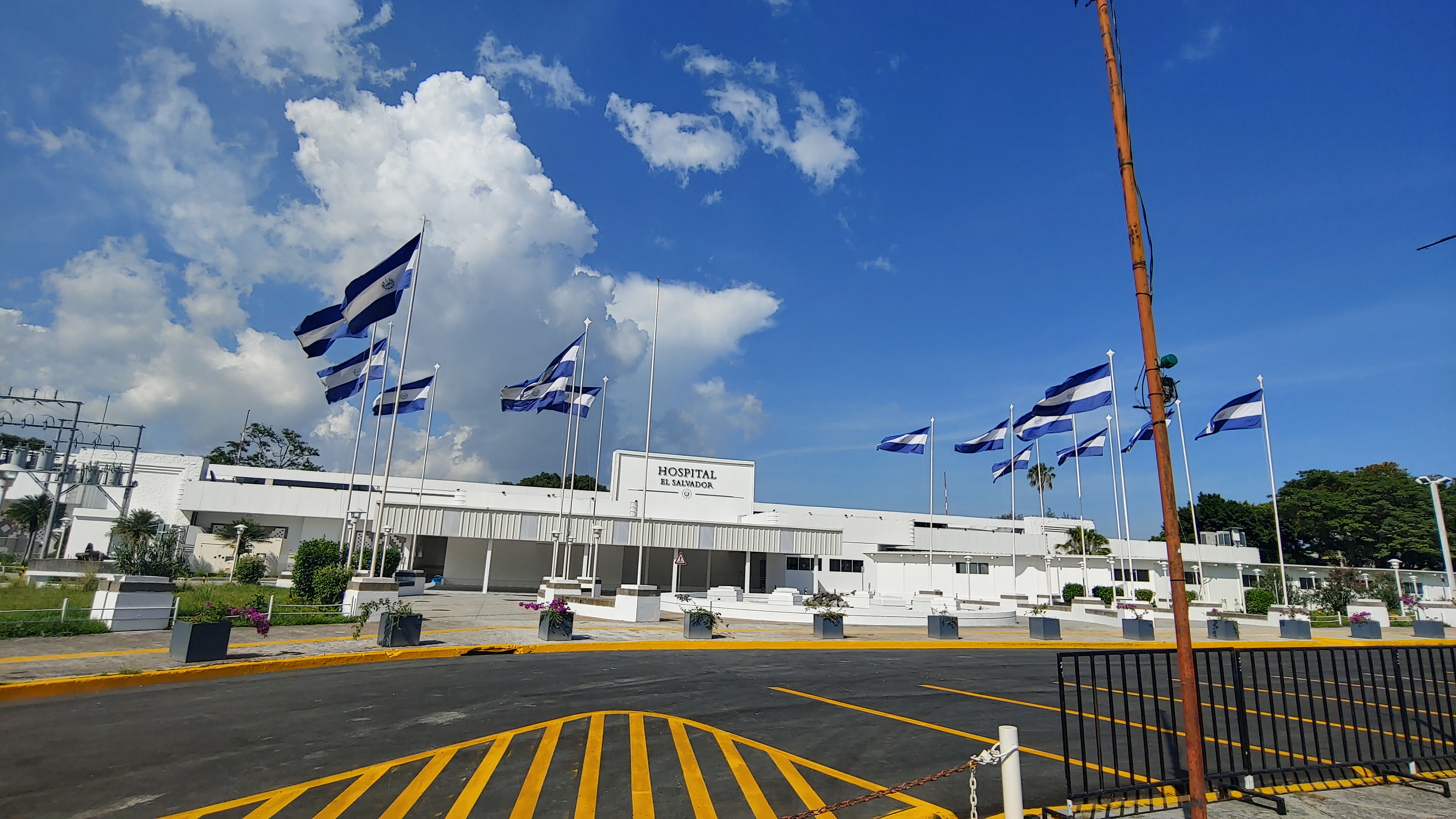
Front entrance

The hospital in its first phase had 400 available beds—105 intensive care unit beds and 295 general hospital beds, which was slated to increase to 1,083 ICU beds and 2,000 total upon completion of phase 3 of construction. The second and third phases were initially anticipated for completion in August 2020, though the latter was delayed several times, first to January 2021; it still was not complete by early March. The third phase included the opening of a three-story building being erected on the former convention center parking lot.

All COVID-19 patients being cared for at other hospitals were to be moved to the new facility to free up the national health system. However, a July report by the national medical association said it was only operating at 25 percent of capacity. The association's president further warned in December, with the third phase of the hospital still not complete, that the hospital system was being saturated with COVID-19 patients and that a system collapse was possible.

== See also ==
- Health in El Salvador#Hospitals
