= World Trade Center San Salvador =

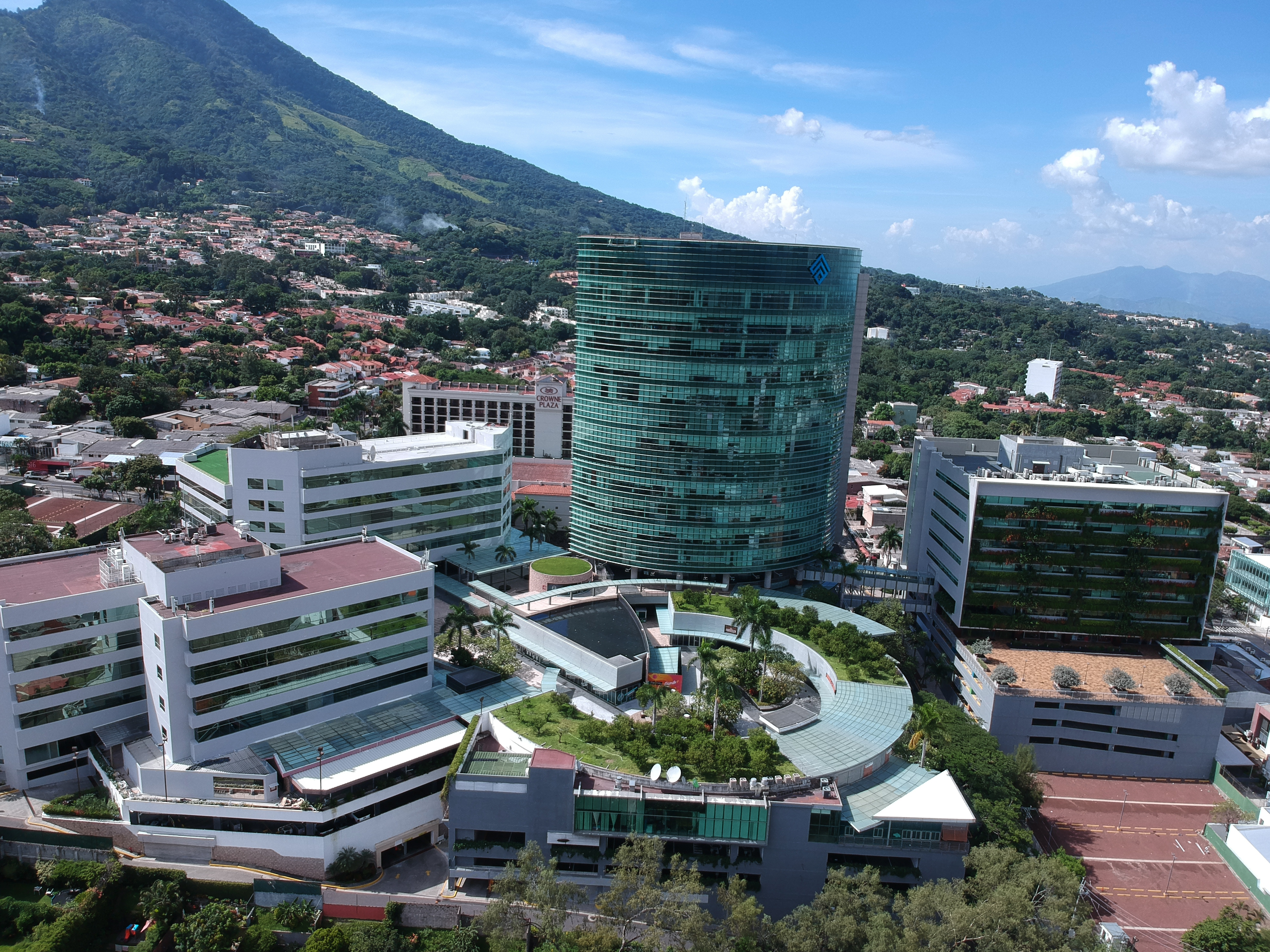
- Interactive map of the World Trade Center San Salvador area

General information
- Location: San Salvador, El Salvador
- Coordinates: 13°42′30.73″N 89°14′27.56″W
- Construction started: 2000
- Completed: 2009
- Owner: Grupo Agrisal

Height
- Top floor: 99 mt

Technical details
- Floor count: Tower I: 8 Tower II: 8 Torre Futura: 20
- Lifts/elevators: 11

Design and construction
- Architect: KMD Architects

World Trade Center San Salvador (WTCSS) is a complex of buildings located in San Salvador, El Salvador. It consists in 3 towers: two of 8 floors, each with 13,000 m^{2} of profitable area for offices and the Torre Futura of 20 floors. The first two towers have maintained a 100% of occupancy by multinational prestigious companies and embassies. El Salvador and Panama, are the only countries that have a World Trade Center in the Centroamerican region.

The WTCSS complex consists in six main elements:

1. Torre Futura
2. Plaza Futura
3. Towers I y II
4. Interconnection with the Crowne Plaza Hotel and its convention center
5. Five levels of parking with capacity for over 1,100 vehicles
6. Quattro (Under construction - 12 floors, 5 for parking and 7 for offices)

== See also ==
- Torre Futura
- Plaza Futura
