= El Salvador and the International Monetary Fund =

El Salvador has been a member of the International Monetary Fund (IMF) since 1946. Their quota currently consists of 287.20 million SDR. The country has received loans from the IMF in the past, but most recently has received only standby loans and currently has no outstanding payments. As of June 2017, the standby arrangements total 1,442,300 SDR while the government has only drawn upon 132,250 SDR.

== Standby arrangements ==
In 1982, two years after El Salvador entered a brutal civil war, the IMF offered to lend 43 million SDR, equivalent to roughly US$84 million. The loan allocated $36 million to compensate for a drop in coffee prices and $48 million as stand-by credit. The stand-by credit was met with conditionality, including "liberalization of exchange rate and trade policies, the 'rationalization' of its interest and pricing policies, and the increase in credit for private industry." While the aid was intended to stabilize the economy, there is speculation as to whether the funds were used to support the Salvadoran government's efforts against the guerrillas. The motivation behind the loan was questioned by critics of the US and IMF involvement in foreign politics. The funds were for "general balance of payments" according to Tom Leddy, Deputy Assistant Secretary of the Treasury for International Monetary Affairs, therefore, there were no set restrictions on how it could be spent.

In January 2009, the IMF approved another standby arrangement totaling US$800 valid for 15 months. The precautionary arrangement was intended to serve as a reserve to combat any shocks the country may experience as due to elections and the 2008 financial crisis. El Salvador switched from using the colón as official currency to the U.S. dollar in 2001, leaving the country even more financially susceptible during the crisis. Furthermore, due to the lack of any domestic monetary policy, IMF reforms heavily focused on fiscal policy and public finances.

Salvadoran authorities had stated that they would only use the I.M.F. loan unless there was extreme need. Instead, they were outsourcing aid from the World Bank, Inter-American Development Bank, and other multilateral institutions. By doing this, they were budgeting as well as helping increase the amount of bank credit. At this time, El Salvador was not dealing with a balance of payment issue as they did not have an intense public debt-to-GDP ratio and was demonstrating secure economic fundamentals.

== International Money Fund programs ==
The Salvadoran Civil War ended in 1992 only to be followed a period of economic growth. Although this growth was accompanied by economic and social developments, it also led to inflation. When inflation continued despite economic contraction through 1995 and the first half of 1996, the IMF designed a program to strengthen public finances. The program focussed on increasing government revenue and containing government expenditures. In order to increase revenue, it encouraged raising taxes and selling state-owned enterprises, such as ANTEL telephone company. The end of the war also brought about a reduction in military spending. Furthermore, the program encouraged the government to compensate for revenue shortages with cuts to the expenditure.

== International Money Fund intervention ==
El Salvador remains the fourth country to receive the largest amounts of aid from America.' According to James Morrell of the Center for International Policy, this loan was amongst the most "controversial and political loan the I.M.F. has made" since granting a loan to Nicaragua.

During November 4–8 of 2019, the I.M.F. met in San Salvador to plan the 2020 budget as well as draft a plan to assist with the country's overall growth. Alina Carare, who led this mission, released a statement that demonstrated the positive growth El Salvador has seen over the past “The economy grew 2.2 percent in the first half of the year, and inflation hovered around zero. After dipping in the second quarter, remittances growth returned to its long-term rate of 4 percent. In 2019 real GDP growth is expected to be 2½ percent on the back of improving business confidence. She went on to reveal that their plan consists of addressing the crime and corruption currently taking place in El Salvador. Their 2020 budget plan consists of increasing spending on human capital, security, and infrastructure to assist with the issues adding to the crisis.
