= Directorate of National Markets of El Salvador =

Administrative oversight of El Salvador's markets

The Directorate of National and Local Commercial Markets Located in Public Spaces (Spanish: Dirección de Mercados Comerciales Nacionales y Locales Ubicados en Espacios Públicos), also known as the National Directorate of National Markets or Directorate of National Markets (Dirección Nacional de Mercados Nacionales o Dirección de Mercados Nacionales), is a decentralized public institution of El Salvador, created through Legislative Decree No. 323, approved by the Legislative Assembly on June 5, 2025, and published in the Official Gazette that same year.

== History ==
The creation of the Directorate of National Markets was an initiative of Salvadoran government intended to organize, regulate, and modernize the markets and commercial establishments built, renovated, or managed by the Executive Branch in public spaces such as plazas and parks. The government's stated objectives were to ensure conditions of free competition, public health, and equal opportunities for both merchants and consumers.

== Purpose and Functions ==
The Directorate of National Markets has the purpose of organizing, planning, promoting, regulating, modernizing, controlling, and overseeing the operation and administration of national markets and commercial establishments in public spaces. Its main responsibilities include:

- Administering markets and establishments under its jurisdiction.
- Issuing regulations for the operation of markets.
- Ensuring the provision of basic services (water, electricity, sanitation, and lighting).
- Permanently supervising commercial activities.
- Allocating and, when applicable, revoking sales stalls or establishments.
- Regulating leases and fees.
- Imposing sanctions for administrative violations.
- Establishing or participating in business corporations to fulfill its purposes.

== Administered Markets ==
The National Directorate of National Markets began its operations with five new commercial centers:

- San Miguelito Market – San Salvador
- Chalchuapa Market – Santa Ana
- Tapalhuaca Market – La Paz
- Monte San Juan Gastronomic Plaza – Cuscatlán
- Puerto El Triunfo Market – Usulután
