= Torre Futura =

Tower in El Salvador

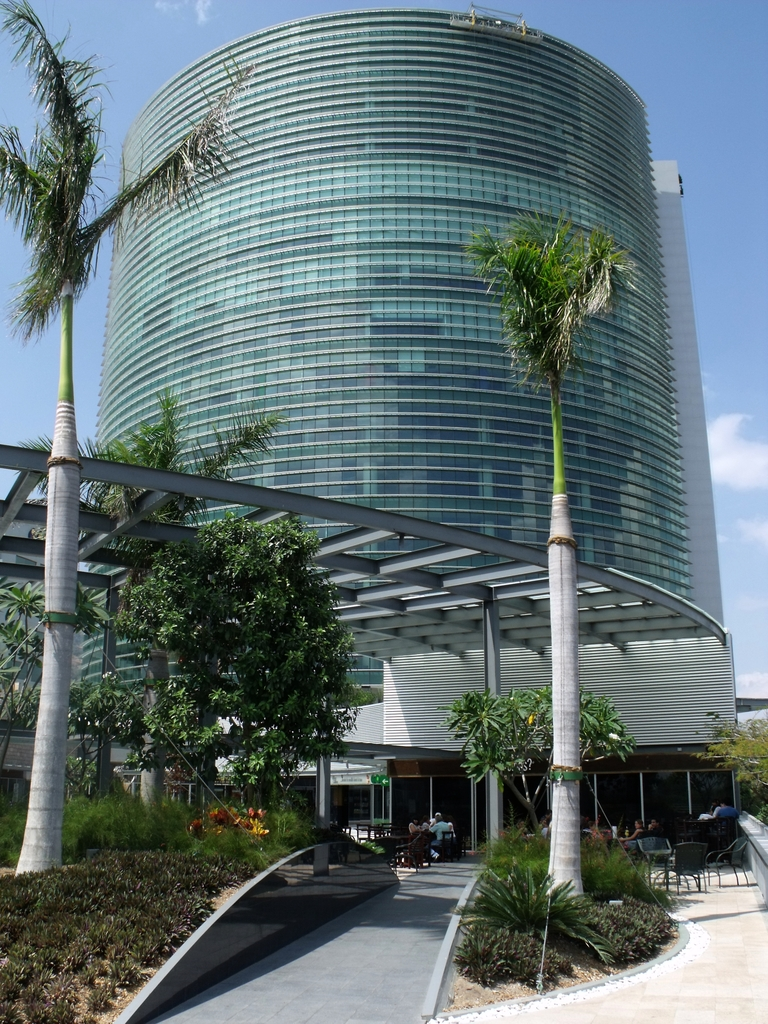
- Interactive map of the Torre Futura area

General information
- Location: San Salvador, El Salvador
- Coordinates: 13°42′30.73″N 89°14′27.56″W
- Completed: 2009
- Cost: $45 million
- Owner: Grupo Agrisal

Height
- Top floor: 92 metres (302 ft)

Technical details
- Floor count: 19
- Lifts/elevators: 8

Design and construction
- Architect: KMD Architects

Torre Futura is the highest tower of the complex at the World Trade Center San Salvador. It has 19 floors and is 92 meters (302 ft) high which also makes it the second highest tower of El Salvador and third of Central America excluding Panama.

== Description ==
It has 20 floors for offices, five for parking, and a shopping plaza. It was developed by Grupo Agrisal and is described as an "intelligent building". A particular feature is the glass that makes up the structure, which occupies 13,000 square metres (140,000 ft^{2}) of low emissivity that limits solar heat input and ultraviolet light, but takes full advantage of natural light. The structure was inaugurated on 1 December 2009 and is the second-highest tower of El Salvador. It is also amongst the most complex and modern buildings throughout Central America.

One of the main innovations of the Torre Futura is the implementation of a first-class shopping mall, called Plaza Futura, which has 3,000 square metres (32,000 ft^{2}) and has exclusive restaurants and a viewpoint from where you can see much of the city. Torre Futura was designed by KMD Architects. Its construction was overseen by the firm MR Melendez Arquitectos, headed by the Salvadoran architect Manuel Roberto Melendez Bischitz.

=== Awards ===
- Best Architectonic Design by "Architectural Digest".

== See also ==
- Plaza Futura
- World Trade Center San Salvador
