= El Salvador Pride =

LGBTQ event in San Salvador, El Salvador

LGBT Pride March of El Salvador
- Scene from the Pride March in San Salvador
- Location: El Salvador
- Type: Pride parade

The LGBTI Pride March of El Salvador, commonly known as El Salvador Pride, is an annual demonstration held since 1997 in the city of San Salvador, the capital of El Salvador, to demand equal rights for the country's LGBT population.

It is the oldest pride march in Central America.

== History ==
The first march, called the Gay Pride March, was organized by the Salvadoran Association for Human Rights Entre Amigos on June 28, 1997, under the leadership and direction of its founder, William Hernández It took place in the context of post-war El Salvador.

Around 200 people participated in the demonstration, protesting for LGBT rights. The march also carried a commemorative tone, honoring the memory of several trans women who were massacred by the Salvadoran army in 1984.

The route of the first march began at Cuscatlán Park and moved through the streets of the Historic Center of the capital, ending at Francisco Morazán Plaza—near the site of the 1984 massacre—where a political and symbolic ceremony was held. Although the march did not have municipal authorization, it did receive logistical support from the National Civil Police (PNC).

The first march also received support from informal street vendors. The response from the national press, however, was quite the opposite. El Diario de Hoy published the following note: "Homosexuals, lesbians, and prostitutes marched through the center of the capital. Some were baton twirlers in drag, whose procession resembled a burlesque parade."

Entre Amigos organized the march from its inception until 2009, when this role was taken over by the Alliance for Sexual Diversity, a collective that brought together various organizations and LGBT activists who were fighting against the ratification of constitutional reforms that would block the path to rights such as civil unions and same-sex adoption. Under the new leadership, and amid threats to bomb the march, the event was renamed the March for Sexual Diversity and adopted the slogan "An Inclusive and Diverse El Salvador." The march drew around 3,000 participants.

The following year, in 2010, the June 28 Committee was formed—a platform made up of LGBT organizations, activists, and allied vendors responsible for organizing the event. Due to the new political landscape following the electoral victory of the Farabundo Martí National Liberation Front in the 2009 presidential elections, attendance grew steadily, reaching around 7,000 participants by 2014.

In 2022, it was estimated that around 22,000 people attended the Pride march, which started from the outskirts of the University of El Salvador (UES) and ended at Plaza Salvador del Mundo in Colonia Escalón, under the slogan "No more delays, Identity Law now." The march concluded with the Pride Fest, organized by El Salvador G. The event was attended by activists such as Karla Guevara, director of the Alejandría Collective, as well as politicians like Johnny Wright Sol, a deputy representing the political party Nuestro Tiempo.
