= Municipal districts of San Salvador =

The municipal districts of San Salvador, the capital city of El Salvador, are naturally delimited by the Acelhuate River on the east, the San Jacinto Hill on the south east, the lower highlands of the Balsam Range on the South, El Picacho Mountain and the Bicentennial Park on the West, and North by the San Antonio River. The municipality is further subdivided into Districts governed by the municipal mayor (Norman Quijano as of 2012) and by a district board. There are seven districts in San Salvador, districts 1-6 and the Historic Downtown.

== District 1 ==
District 1 has a total population of 118,325 as of 2009. The population is made up by 63,895 females and 54,430 males, giving the District a gender ratio of 1.17:1 (For every one male there are 1.17 females). The district is limited by the municipalities of Mejicanos, and Cuscatancingo on the north, by the Alameda Juan Pablo II on the south, on the east by the municipalities of Soyapango and Ciudad Delgado, and on the west by 25th Avenue North and 29th Street West. The District office is located on 2nd Avenue North and 23rd Street East. District 1 is home to the El Salvador National University (UES), the largest and only public university in the country, with campuses in San Salvador, and in other important cities in the country such as Santa Ana, and San Miguel. District 1 is also the home of the government center, home to the Ministry of Education, Ministry of Economy, Ministry of Governing, The Salvadorian Central Reserve, The Republic’s General Attorney, The Supreme Court, the Legislative Assembly and the Public Employee Pension Committee. Although all of the government offices are located in District One, the presidential palace is located in District 3, and the Presidential Residence is also in District 3. The National Sports Arena is located in District 1 as well. It is also home to some of the oldest San Salvador neighborhoods, such as Colonia La Rabida, Colonia Magaña, Colonia Layco, and others. Initially these neighborhoods were occupied by the upper middle class, but with the passage of time and the growth of the city, they are now occupied by the lower middle class. District 1 is also home to the Colonia Medica or the Medical Borough, which is the largest center in the country for hospitals, clinics, and access to doctors.

== District 2 ==
District 2 has a total population of 120,475 inhabitants as of 2009, making it the most populated District in San Salvador. It covers a total area of 11.16 square kilometers (4.5 square miles). The municipality is limited by, Mejicanos at north, La Mascota Creek, and The Alameda Manuel Enrique Araujo on the south, 25th Avenue North on the East, and West by the Picacho Hill. The district was originally started at the Colonia Flor Blanca and the Construction of the Metrocentro Mall in 1968, and it was not until the late 1970s when development there began in earnest. During its urbanization the district was intended to be the focal point for modernization in the municipality. Development was halted due to the civil war of the 80s, but began again as soon as the war ended in the early 90s. Today District 2 ranks as the second most important financial district of the city, and is home to mostly middle class residential neighborhoods. The district is also home to one of the largest financial centers, the CFG (Centro Financiero Gigante), which is made up of two towers and four business buildings. Major occupants of the CFG building include Tigo, Telefónica, RED, Banco Azteca, Movistar, Stream Global Services, and the Israeli Embassy. District 2 is famously home to Metrocentro, the largest shopping mall in Central America, with a total of 190,000 square meters of space, and an average of 1.8 million monthly visitors, with a peak of an average 2.4 million visitors in December. The Metrocentro mall was remodeled in August 2012, and there are expansion plans for the first semester of 2013. District 2 is also home to Plaza Las Americas, or El Salvador del Mundo, as it is known locally; the plaza is located at one of the largest intersections in the city, where Paseo Escalón, Constitution Boulevard, Alameda Manuel Enrique Araujo, and Roosevelt Avenue meet. The Plaza was remodeled in 2010 under the administration of Norman Quijano. Some of the largest neighborhoods in the district are Colonia Miramonte, Urbanizacion Buenos Aires, and Colonia Miralvalle. The Luis Poma Theatre is also located in District 2.

Bird's-eye view of Monumento al Divino Salvador del Mundo plaza

== District 3 ==
District 3 has a population of 51,325 inhabitants. Although District 2 was originally planned to be the economic center of the capital, today District 3 stands as the single most important economic and social district in San Salvador. It is bordered by Mejicanos to the north, Antiguo Cuscatlán to the south and the west, and by the Manuel Enrique Araujo Alameda to the East. It is currently undergoing a high-rise boom that started in 2007. District 3 is home to the World Trade Center San Salvador a complex of two 6-story buildings, a restaurant plaza (Plaza Futura), and the Torre Futura, a 99-meter (325 feet) high rise where companies such as Microsoft and Uber have offices. The World Trade Center is connected to the Crowne Plaza Hotel. Also, District 3 is home to most of the nightlife. The Escalón Neighborhood holds the Galerías Mall, a 5-story mall that was built around and on an old mansion and El Paseo Shopping Center, which houses mostly restaurants. There is also an endless number of restaurants located on the Paseo General Escalón and in the Escalón Neighborhood. The Zona Rosa and the Colonia San Benito are home to most of the embassies in San Salvador, the most expensive private bilingual schools, restaurants and international hotel chains such as Hilton Princess and Sheraton. Zona Rosa is home to apartment high rises, the most prominent ones being Alisios 115, La Capilla 525, La Capilla 515, La Capilla 370, Campestre 105 and Terra Alta. District 3 is also home to the National Anthropology Museum and the International Convention Center, the largest convention center in Central America. District 3 is composed of Colonia Escalón, Colonia San Benito, Colonia Maqulishuat, and Escalón Norte, which are predominantly upper and upper-middle-class neighborhoods. The Bicentennial Park on Jerusalem Avenue was inaugurated on November 5, 2011, under the first administration of mayor Norman Quijano, and it is the largest metropolitan park in Central America, with over 221 acres (89 ha). The district has many monuments, most notably the statue of Jesus Christ, El Salvador del Mundo, at the Plaza Las Americas. There are also many government buildings, including the Ministry of Public Works and the Ministry of Tourism, as well as the headquarters of corporations in the financial services sector, such as HSBC and AFP Crecer.

== District 4 ==
District 4 has a total population of 68,465 inhabitants in an area of 12.36 km2. It borders District 2 in the north, District 5 on the east, District 3 on the West and the municipality of Antiguo Cuscatlán in the La Libertad Department in the South, and Southwest. District four is further subdivided into 7 neighborhoods, La Cima (I, II, III and IV), Colonia San Francisco, Lomas de Altamira and Colonia La Floresta. The district is mainly a residential district for the middle class. The most important landmark in the district is the Estadio Cuscatlán, with a capacity of over 45,000, is the largest soccer venue not only in Central America, but in the Caribbean as well. It was announced on November 16, 2007, that Estadio Cuscatlán would become the first soccer stadium in Central America and the Caribbean to have a large LED screen, on which spectators can view the action. The stadium was built in the early 1980s just before the beginning of the civil war, intended to jump-start an era of modernization in San Salvador, but development in the country ground to a halt during the twelve years of war. District 4 is also home to the Monumento Hermano Bienvenido a Casa, the monument was decorated with the artwork of the Salvadoran artist Fernando Llort.

== District 5 ==
District 5 contains mostly middle-class and lower-middle-class homes, and also includes the National Zoo. The district borders San Marcos on the east. Many tourists visit this district for its eateries, particularly its numerous pupuserias, even though it has a relatively high crime rate. District 5 has many viewpoints which look out over San Salvador and other cities beyond, such as San Marcos, Mejicanos, and Ciudad Delgado.

== District 6 ==
District 6, bordering Soyapango on the east and Ciudad Delgado on the north, is the smallest district in San Salvador. The neighborhood is middle-lower class, and is known to be dangerous. The most outstanding landmark is the San Jacinto Hill; the Old Presidential House was formerly located there.
