= SIMÁN =

Salvadoran department store chain

Almacenes Simán
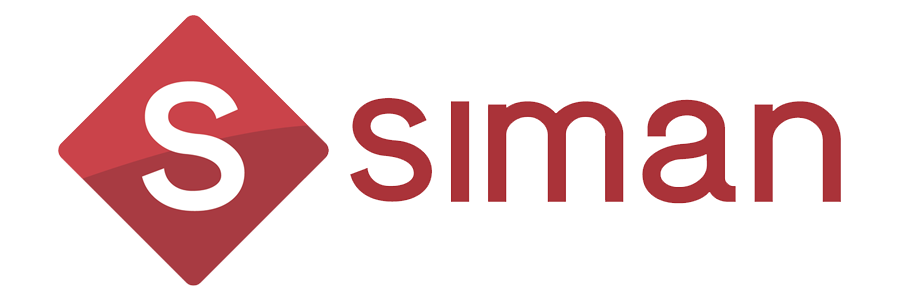
- Trade name: SIMAN
- Type: Private
- Industry: Retail
- Founded: 8 December 1921; 104 years ago, San Salvador, El Salvador
- Founder: José Jorge Simán
- Headquarters: Galerías Escalón, San Salvador, El Salvador
- Number of locations: 18 department stores and smaller formats (2026)
- Area served: El Salvador, Guatemala, Nicaragua, Costa Rica
- Key people: Ricardo Simán (chairman); Juan Pablo Gálvez (CEO)
- Products: Clothing, footwear, cosmetics, home goods, furniture, appliances, electronics, toys
- Number of employees: c. 7,800 (2022)
- Parent: Grupo Alsicorp
- Website: siman.com

Almacenes Simán (styled SIMAN) is a Central American department store chain from El Salvador. It was founded in San Salvador in 1921 and now has department stores in El Salvador, Guatemala, Nicaragua and Costa Rica. Its parent company, Grupo Alsicorp, also runs the Inditex franchises (Zara, Pull&Bear, Bershka and others) in five Central American countries.

== History ==
=== Downtown San Salvador ===
José Jorge Simán (11 November 1885 Bethlehem, Palestine, Ottoman Empire – 16 June 1953) and his wife Natalia emigrated to El Salvador, and on 8 December 1921 he opened a small shop in one of the portales (arcades) of downtown San Salvador. According to his grandson Ricardo Simán, he first sold cloth, then added oils and other goods. A few years later the shop moved across from Parque Hula Hula, next to the Farmacia Americana.

In 1969 the family started its own building on Calle Rubén Darío. It was going up during the war with Honduras. Simán Centro opened in 1970. It was the first department store in El Salvador and the first store in the country with escalators, elevators and air conditioning. It was enlarged in 1974.

In 1976 the store was set on fire with incendiary bombs hidden in sacks of merchandise; all the stock on sale was lost and the perpetrators were never found. During the Salvadoran Civil War small bombs were often left in the store's ten display windows, so all of them were closed up. Imports were banned in those years, and Simán bought local textiles and developed its own brands until imports were allowed again, with high tariffs, in 1989. The 1986 San Salvador earthquake damaged the store, and Simán opened a small temporary branch in an old house (casona) in Colonia Escalón. Simán Centro stayed open until 2010, when it was replaced by a new store at Plaza Mundo in Soyapango. The building is still known as "Ex Simán Centro".

=== Expansion ===
In 1983 Simán opened its second store, in a building it bought in Metrocentro, then the largest shopping center in El Salvador. The first store outside the capital area, in Santa Ana, followed in 1990 and another in San Miguel in 1994. On 7 December 1994 Simán Galerías opened in the new Galerías Escalón mall, on the site of the old house. Simán owns the mall, which is also where its head offices are.

Ricardo Félix Simán Dabdoub, the founder's grandson, joined the company at 18 and moved into retail in the early 1980s. Under his leadership, the chain expanded abroad, starting with a store at Los Próceres in Zona 10 of Guatemala City in 1993, then Managua in 2002 and Costa Rica in 2009. In Nicaragua Simán bought the Galería Internacional store in Reparto Serrano, Managua, in 2002, moved to Galerías Santo Domingo in November 2004 and opened a second store at Metrocentro in November 2005. The first Costa Rica store, at Multiplaza Escazú, is 11,000 m² in size. A second opened at Multiplaza del Este in Curridabat on 14 November 2013, which brought the chain to 13 stores: six in El Salvador, three in Guatemala, two in Nicaragua and two in Costa Rica. In October 2014 Simán opened its largest store, 12,000 m², at Pradera Concepción in Guatemala. The third Costa Rican store opened at City Mall in Alajuela on 27 July 2022.

=== Recent years ===
In 2023 Ricardo Simán, then 70, stepped down as CEO and became chairman of Grupo Alsicorp. For the first time the company was run by people from outside the family: Juan Pablo Gálvez for the department stores and Pablo Portillo for the franchise business. At the end of 2022 Simán had about 7,800 direct employees, close to 200,000 m² of floor space across its stores, and online sales were around 10% of the total. The La Gran Vía store in Antiguo Cuscatlán, the busiest in the chain, reopened in November 2023 after a renovation with a façade by Mexican architect Miguel de la Torre.

Simán has also opened small stores called Siman Express, mostly for picking up online orders in smaller cities. They range from 80 to 300 m², and the company planned 25 in Guatemala and ten in El Salvador. The first in El Salvador opened in July 2025 at El Encuentro in San Miguel.

== Stores ==
Simán stores. Blue: El Salvador. Red: Guatemala. Green: Nicaragua. Orange: Costa Rica. Numbers match the table.

Numbers in the table match the markers on the map. Former stores have no number.

No.	Country	City	Location	Opened	Remarks
	El Salvador	San Salvador	Simán Centro, Calle Rubén Darío, downtown	1921 (shop); 1970 (building)	Closed 2010. The original shop, later the first department store in the country. Burned in 1976 and damaged in the 1986 earthquake. Replaced by the Plaza Mundo store. The building is still called "Ex Simán Centro".
1	El Salvador	San Salvador	Metrocentro San Salvador	1983	Second store, in a building bought in what was then the country's largest shopping center.
	El Salvador	San Salvador	La Casona, Colonia Escalón	1986	Closed. Temporary store in an old house, opened after the earthquake damaged Simán Centro. The Galerías store was built on the site.
2	El Salvador	Santa Ana	Metrocentro Santa Ana	1990	First store outside the capital, with over 1,500 m² of sales floor. Now in the Metrocentro mall.
3	El Salvador	San Miguel	Metrocentro San Miguel	1994	
4	El Salvador	San Salvador	Galerías Escalón	7 December 1994	On the site of La Casona. Simán owns the mall, which also houses its head offices. The first Zara in Central America opened here in 2002.
5	El Salvador	Antiguo Cuscatlán	La Gran Vía	2003 or 2004	Sources differ on the year. The busiest store in the chain. Reopened in November 2023 after a renovation, with 14,000 m² and a new façade by Mexican architect Miguel de la Torre.
6	El Salvador	Soyapango	Plaza Mundo	2010	Replaced Simán Centro. Includes a Siman Outlet.
7	El Salvador	San Miguel	El Encuentro, Cantón El Sitio	July 2025	Siman Express (218 m²), the first in El Salvador.
8	Guatemala	Guatemala City	Los Próceres, Zona 10	1993	First store outside El Salvador.
9	Guatemala	Guatemala City	Miraflores, Zona 11	2003	
10	Guatemala	Guatemala City	Oakland Mall, Zona 10	2008	
11	Guatemala	Santa Catarina Pinula	Pradera Concepción	October 2014	12,000 m², the largest store in the chain when it opened.
12	Guatemala	Quetzaltenango	Interplaza Xela		Kiosk.
13	Guatemala	Guatemala City	Metronorte		Kiosk.
14	Guatemala	San Cristóbal Totonicapán	Metroplaza 4 Caminos		Kiosk.
15	Guatemala	Jutiapa	Metroplaza		Siman Express.
16	Guatemala	Palín	Plaza El Encuentro		Siman Express.
	Nicaragua	Managua	Galería Internacional, Reparto Serrano	2002	Moved 2004. Bought in 2002; Simán's first store in Nicaragua.
17	Nicaragua	Managua	Galerías Santo Domingo	November 2004	
18	Nicaragua	Managua	Metrocentro Managua	November 2005	Simán's own timeline gives 2008.
19	Nicaragua	León			
20	Nicaragua	Estelí	Multicentro Estelí		
21	Costa Rica	Escazú	Multiplaza Escazú	2009	First store in Costa Rica; 11,000 m².
22	Costa Rica	Curridabat	Multiplaza del Este	14 November 2013	
23	Costa Rica	Alajuela	City Mall	27 July 2022	

== Franchises ==
=== Inditex ===
Since 2002 the group, Grupo Aliscorp, besides Simán, has also run the franchises of the Spanish fashion group Inditex in El Salvador, Guatemala, Honduras, Nicaragua and Costa Rica. The first Zara in Central America opened at Galerías Escalón in San Salvador on 4 May 2002. In Costa Rica Zara, Zara Home and Massimo Dutti came first; Bershka, Pull&Bear and Stradivarius opened there in 2013 at Multiplaza Escazú. In Honduras the group operates Inditex franchise stores but has not opened a Simán department store there.

Inditex stores run by the group, as of 31 January 2026
Country	Zara	Pull&Bear	Massimo Dutti	Bershka	Stradivarius	Oysho	Zara Home	Total
El Salvador	1	2	—	2	2	1	—	8
Guatemala	3	3	1	3	3	1	1	15
Honduras	2	2	1	2	2	1	1	11
Nicaragua	1	1	—	1	1	—	—	4
Costa Rica	2	2	1	2	2	1	1	11
Total	9	10	3	10	10	4	3	49

=== Other chains ===
Grupo Alsicorp also runs its own fashion chain, Prisma Moda (as of November 2026: 14 stores in El Salvador and 3 in Guatemala), MAC Cosmetics (10 points of sale) and Xclaim (beauty, 2 stores in El Salvador and 2 in Guatemala). In 2018 El Corte Inglés women's fashion brand Sfera was added as a department to the Simán stores at Multiplaza Escazú, La Gran Vía and Miraflores.
