= Historic Downtown San Salvador =

Historic Downtown San Salvador Centro Histórico de San Salvador
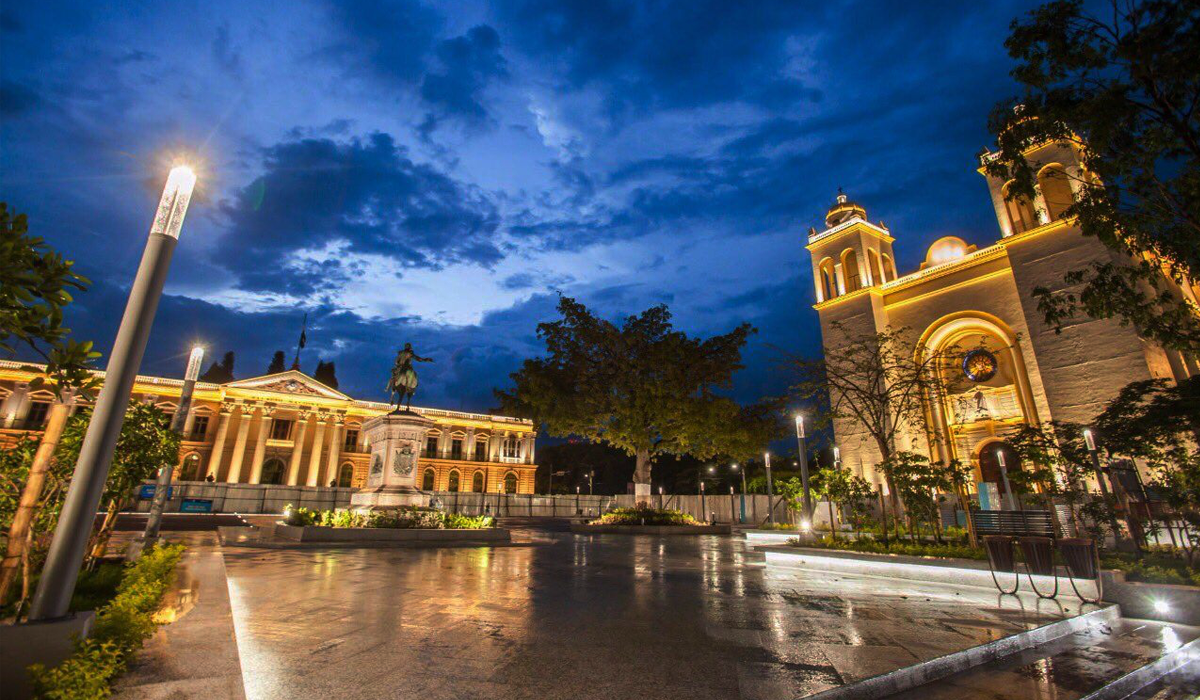
- Panoramic view from Plaza Gerardo Barrios with National Palace from the west, and the Metropolitan Cathedral from the north in the historic centre of San Salvador.
- Interactive map of Historic Downtown San Salvador
- Coordinates: 13°41′51″N 89°11′28″W
- Country: El Salvador
- City: San Salvador
- Municipal City: District 1
- Settled: 16th century
- Elevation: 650 m (2,130 ft)

Population (2024)
  - Total: 9,000
- Time zone: UTC−6 (CST)
- Website: www.centrohistorico.gob.sv

Historic Downtown San Salvador includes the area where the capital city of El Salvador has been located since the 16th century. This district has long been the country's political, economic and religious center.

The history of San Salvador began here in the mid-16th century. After the pacification of the region by the Spanish conquistadors, the small town of Villa de San Salvador in the Valle de la Bermuda (Valley of Bermuda) was gradually abandoned. The settlement was relocated in 1545 to the valley known by the native Pipils as Zalcuatitán, and renamed "Valle de las Hamacas" by the Spaniards. This campsite was on the slope then called Palo Verde, and was known as "La Aldea". North of that site rose the Plaza Mayor, where the Plaza Libertad now stands. The Church dedicated to Santísimo Salvador del Mundo (the Holy Savior of the World) was erected on its east side.

The original buildings of the Spanish colony have been mostly destroyed by natural disasters over the years. The few notable surviving buildings were erected in the late 19th and early 20th centuries. The earthquake of 1986 severely damaged the area, and due to rising unemployment it has been occupied by a large number of street vendors and other informal traders. Mayor Norman Quijano started several large projects with the goal of restoring the former grandeur of the buildings in the center. One such project is to reroute the public transportation routes so they no longer pass through the historic downtown. Another project is the relocation of the illegal street vendors to a designated public market.

In 1986, Mayor Morales Ehrlich closed streets in the downtown of the city to create a large pedestrian mall, which has resulted in chronic traffic congestion. Since 2009, Mayor Quijano has worked for the redevelopment of parks and historic buildings in the Rescate del Centro Historico, which involves the removal of the street vendors. This has led to several riots in the area, but he has managed to place the vendors in new markets where they can operate their own stalls. Quijano is widely regarded as the first mayor to truly care for the welfare of the city, consequently he was reelected in 2012.

In contrast to many other cities, the financial center of San Salvador is not located downtown, but at the periphery, towards the northwestern sections of the city. Downtown or "Old" San Salvador possesses many historical buildings, including the National Palace, the National Theater, the Plaza Libertad, and the Cathedral. Due to continuous seismic activity, downtown San Salvador currently has no major high rise buildings. However, modern building technology is allowing the construction of taller earthquake-resistant buildings. The tallest buildings are those in the Governmental Center, the tallest is 14 stories and 65 m in height. However, the tallest structure overall is not a building, but rather the cathedral's bell tower, which is approximately 80 m in height.

== Notable sites ==
=== National Palace ===
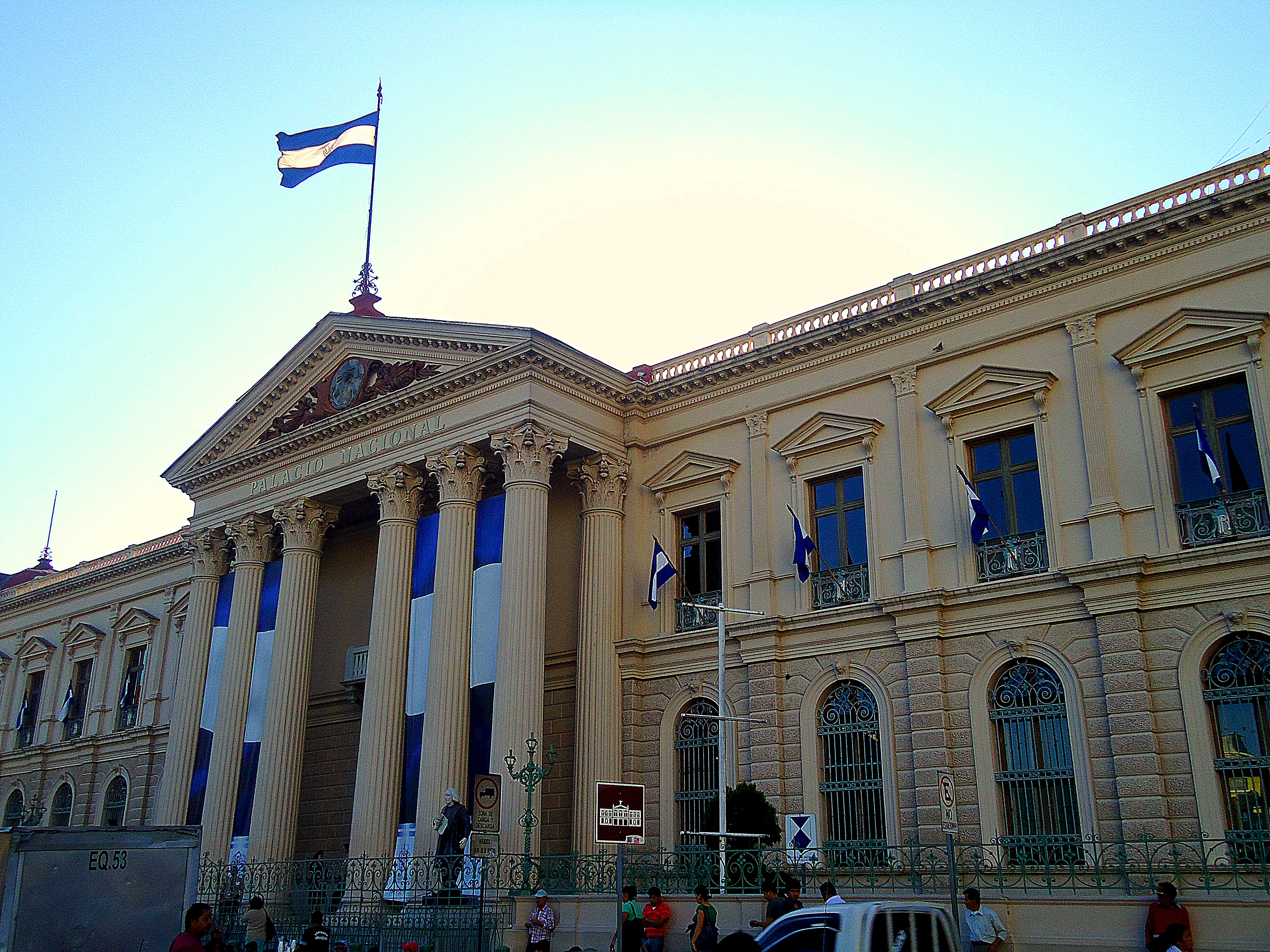
National Palace (El Salvador)

The current National Palace building replaced the old National Palace built in 1866–1870, which was destroyed by fire on December 19, 1889. The construction, done between 1905 and 1911, was the work of engineer José Emilio Alcaine, under the direction of the foreman Pascasio González Erazo. To finish the project, legislation was passed that collected one colon for every quintal of coffee exported. The materials used were imported from several European countries including Germany, Italy and Belgium. The Palace's facilities were occupied by government offices until 1974.

The building contains four main rooms and 101 secondary rooms; each of the four main rooms has a distinctive color. The Red Room (Salon Rojo) is used for receptions held by the Salvadoran Foreign Ministry, and the ceremonial presentation of ambassadors' credentials. It has been used for ceremonial purposes since the administration of General Maximiliano Hernández Martínez. The Yellow Room (Salon Amarillo) is used as an office for the President of the Republic, while the Pink Room (Salon Rosado) housed the Supreme Court and later the Ministry of Defense. The Blue Room (Salon Azul) was the meeting place of the Legislature of El Salvador from 1906, and its classical architecture with Ionian, Corinthian and Roman elements is notable. The room is now called the Salvadoran Parliament in commemoration of its former purpose, and was declared a National Historic Landmark in 1974.

=== Metropolitan Cathedral ===
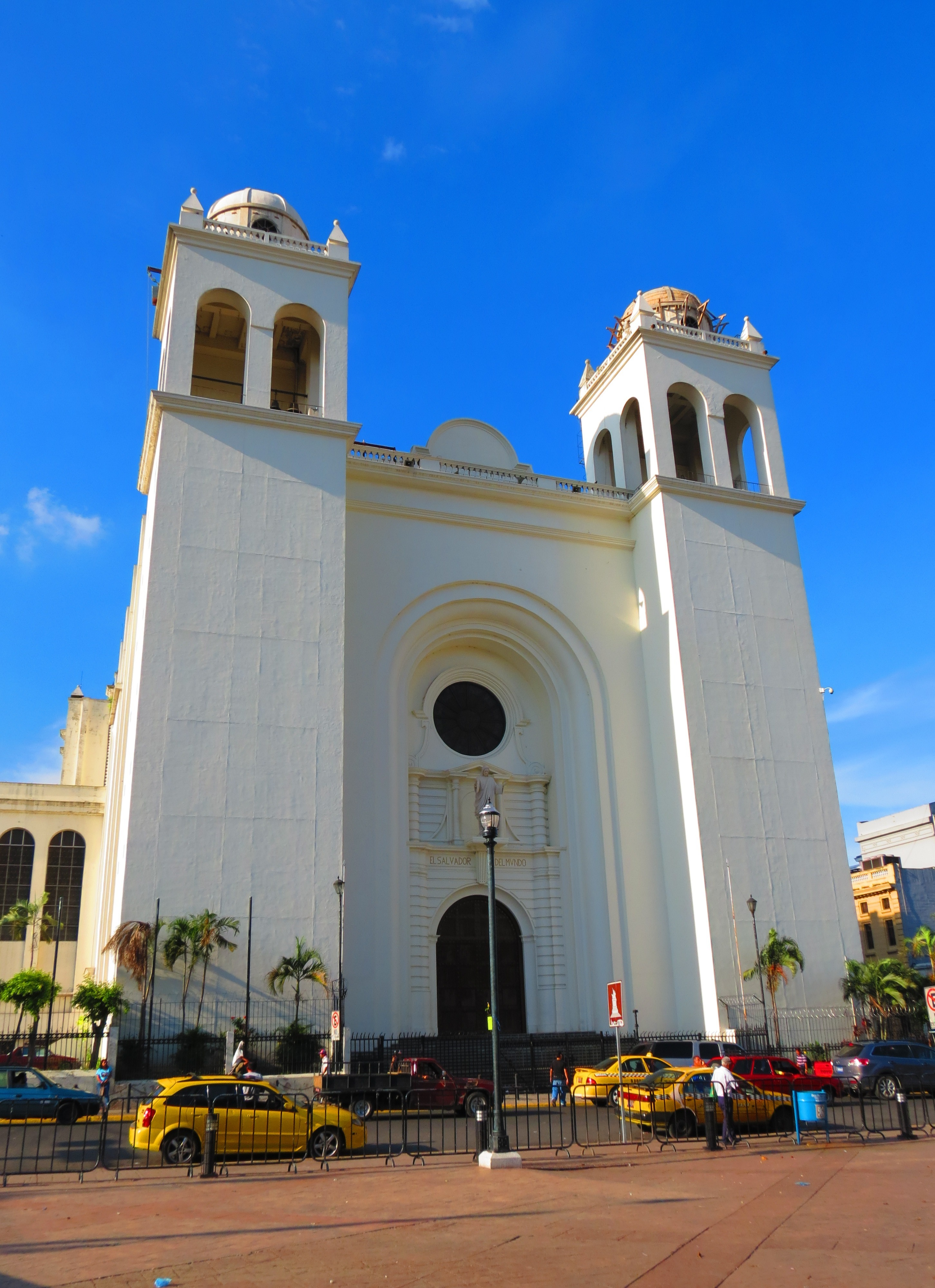
Metropolitan Cathedral of San Salvador

The Metropolitan Cathedral of the Holy Savior (Catedral Metropolitana de San Salvador) is the principal church of the Roman Catholic Archdiocese of San Salvador and the seat of the Archbishop of San Salvador. The church was twice visited by Pope John Paul II, who said that the cathedral was "intimately allied with the joys and hopes of the Salvadoran people." During his visits in 1983 and 1996, the Pope knelt and prayed before the Tomb of Archbishop Óscar Romero, assassinated in 1980, whose tomb here is a major draw for pilgrims. The Cathedral's site is the location of the old Temple of Santo Domingo (St. Dominic).

Forty four people died on Palm Sunday, March 31, 1980, during the funeral of Archbishop Romero, as a result of a stampede after some gunmen, allegedly members of security forces (although it has never been corroborated), fired on mourners and on Romero's funeral cortege. The gunmen were never identified. The square in front of the Cathedral was the site of celebrations after the signing of the Chapultepec Peace Accords that ended the Salvadoran Civil War in 1992. The Cathedral was finished off with a festive tiled facade by the Salvadoran master Fernando Llort and inaugurated on March 19, 1999.

=== National Theater ===
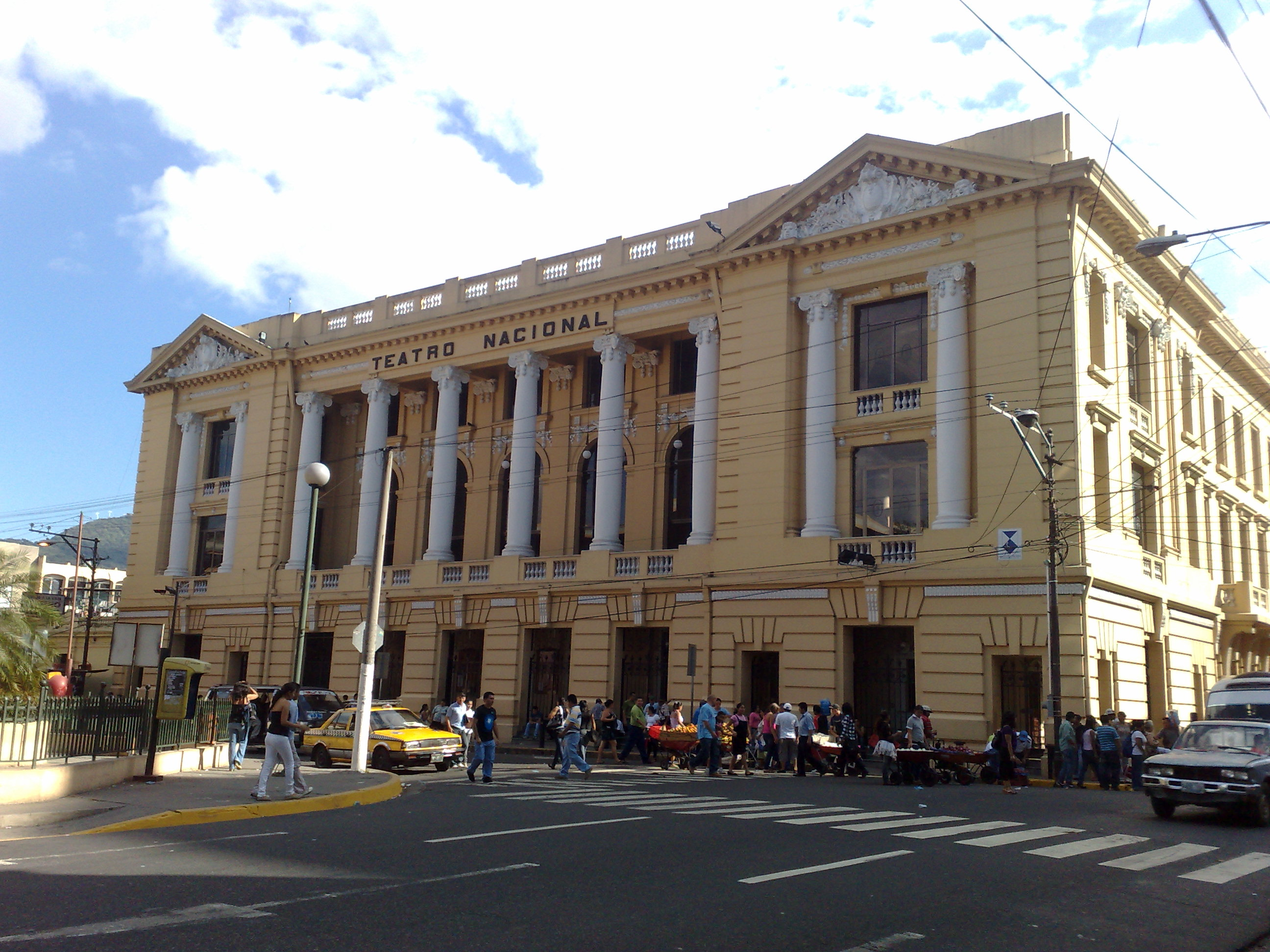
National Theater of El Salvador

The Teatro Nacional de El Salvador, or National Theater of El Salvador, is the oldest theater in Central America. It was designed by the French architect Daniel Beylard, with construction starting on November 3, 1911. The building was inaugurated on March 1, 1917. It is of French Renaissance style with modern touches, and was decorated by the Italian architect Lucio Cappellaro. Its Grand Hall is considered one of the most beautiful and elegant halls in Central America.

The National Theater is located on the southern side of Francisco Morazán Plaza on Calle Delgado. It was built in the French Renaissance style with details done in the Rococo, Romantic, and Art Nouveau styles, and can seat 650 spectators in the Grand Hall. It has balconies on three levels—the Presidential Balcony, located between the third and second Floor, has a direct view of center stage. The building features an ellipsoidal dome containing a mural by painter Carlos Cañas and a crystal chandelier; other impressive spaces include the Chamber Hall and the Grand Foyer. The theater is open to tourists, and since the Historic Downtown Restoration has been used for plays, shows, operas, song recitals, and modern dance performances. It is the largest and most luxurious theater in Central America, and was declared a National Monument in 1979.

=== Calle Arce ===
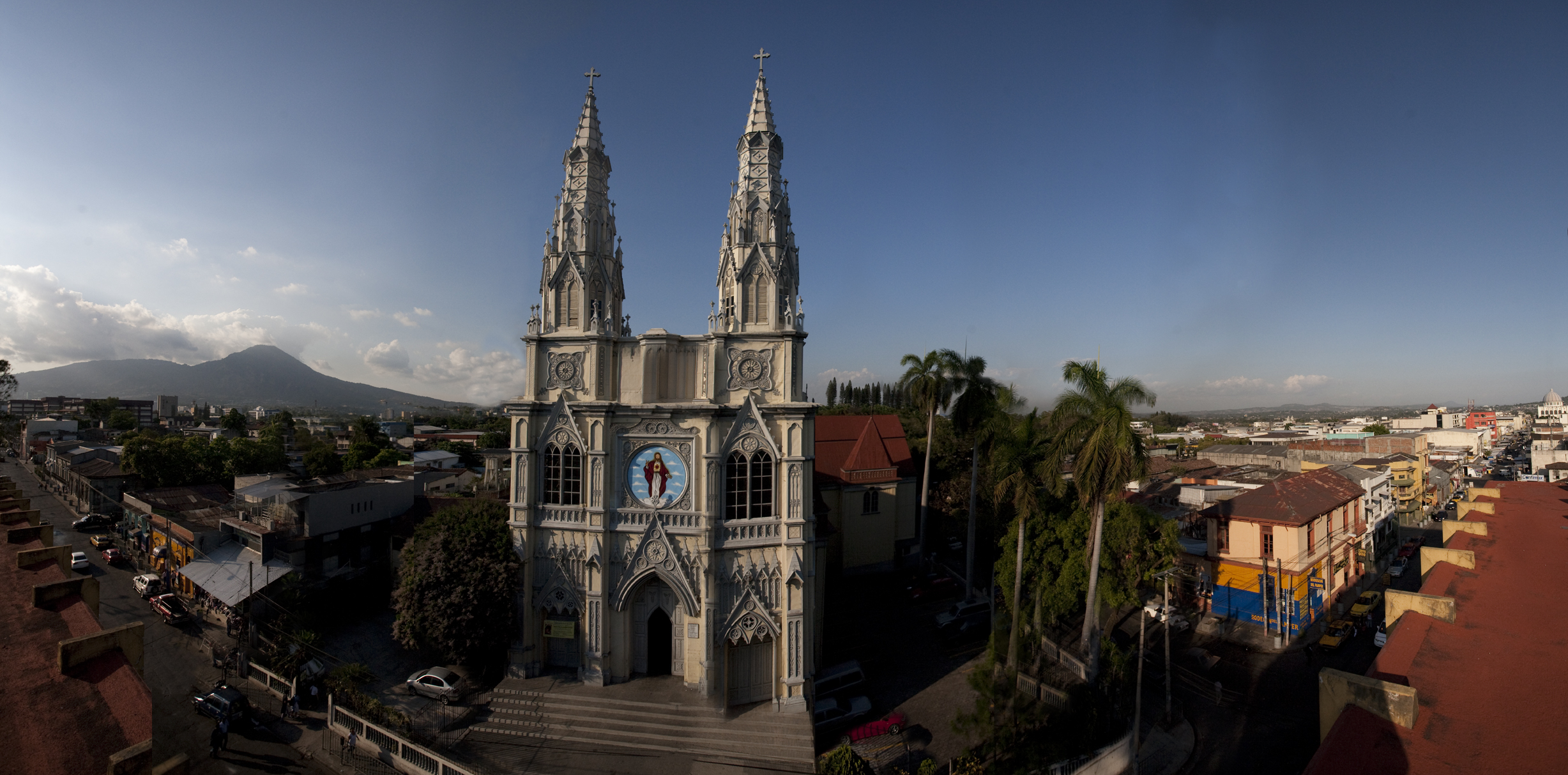
Basilica Sagrado Corazon de Jesús stands in front of Calle Arce

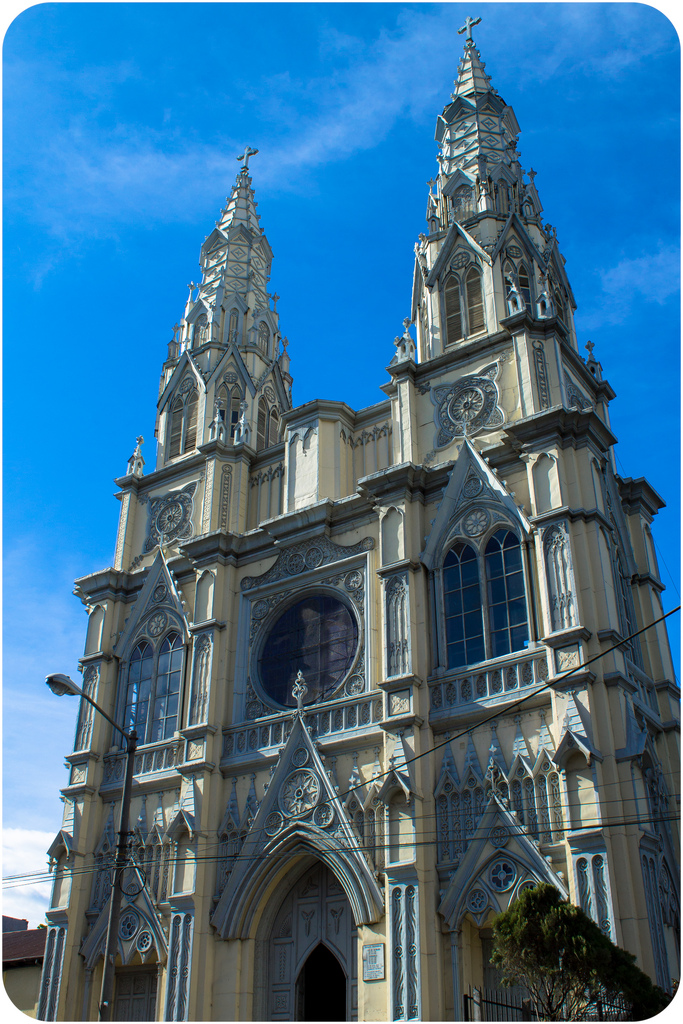
Basilica de Sagrado Corazón de Jesús

Calle Arce (Maple Street) is a major street in San Salvador. Mayor Norman Quijano inaugurated the first phase of its redevelopment near the Plaza de la Salud, which focuses on improvements to the sidewalks between 21st and 19th Avenida Norte. Twelve antique lights, originally from Spain and dating from 1900, will be installed, along with six benches and forty trees.

At the same time, sidewalks will be renovated with ramps to provide access for people with disabilities and seniors. Calle Arce is monitored by 24 members of the Corps Metropolitan Agents (CAM), who specialize in the maintenance and protection of the new public space.

To maximize its potential, the street will be developed through environmentally and sociologically conscious urban interventions, the construction focusing on creation of suitable spaces for cultural and academic activities, social and health services, as well as formal and informal trade in the area. The project is intended to serve as a model for the rehabilitation of other arteries in the historic center, counting on strong support from related institutions and the general public.

=== Plaza Gerardo Barrios ===
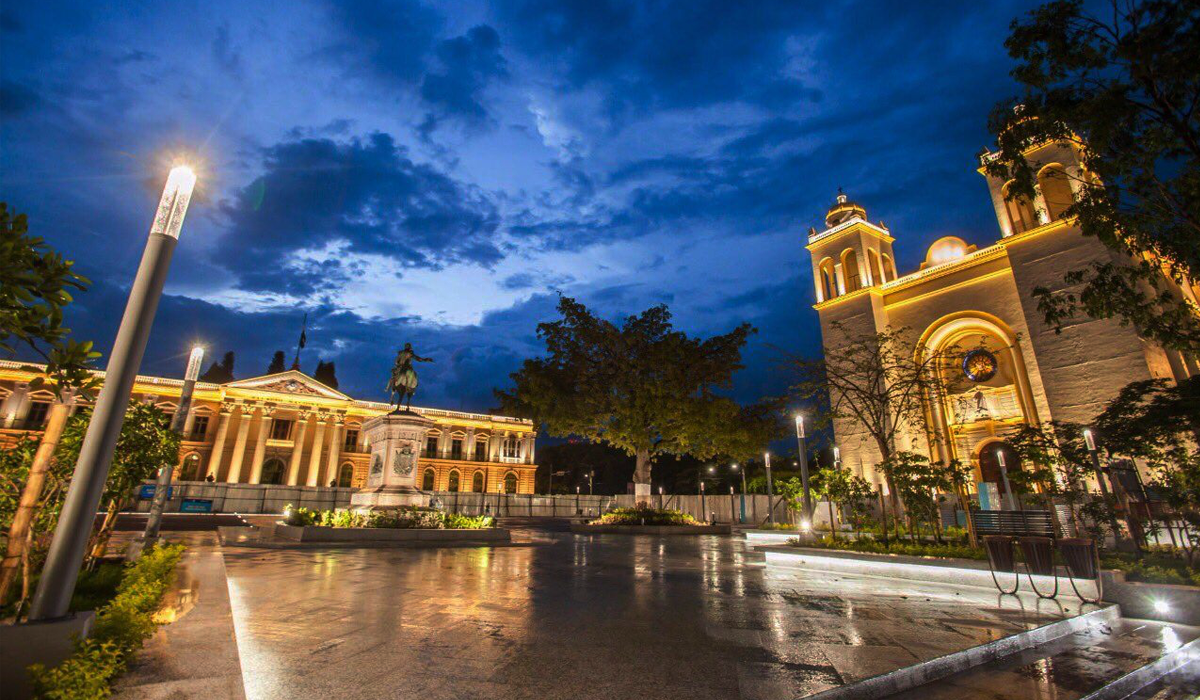
Plaza Gerardo Barrios

The Plaza Gerardo Barrios, also known as the Plaza Cívica, is located in the heart of the city. The statue that dominates the site, designed by Francisco Durini, is dedicated to President Gerardo Barrios and was unveiled in 1909. It was the work of the sculptors Antonio and Carlos Ezeta, who were brothers. The figure, made of bronze, is placed on a pedestal of granite and depicts battle scenes and the shield of El Salvador.

Plaza Gerardo Barrios is the site of many demonstrations and political rallies. Mass is celebrated there as well, and it is the destination of many parades. The plaza is also the focal point for celebrations accompanying the feast day of the Holy Savior (Spanish: San Salvador) on August 5 and 6. The religious procession held on Good Friday called El Descenso (The Descent), dedicated to the Divine Savior of the World, representing the Crucifixion of Jesus and his descent from the Cross, terminates there.

=== Plaza Salvador del Mundo ===
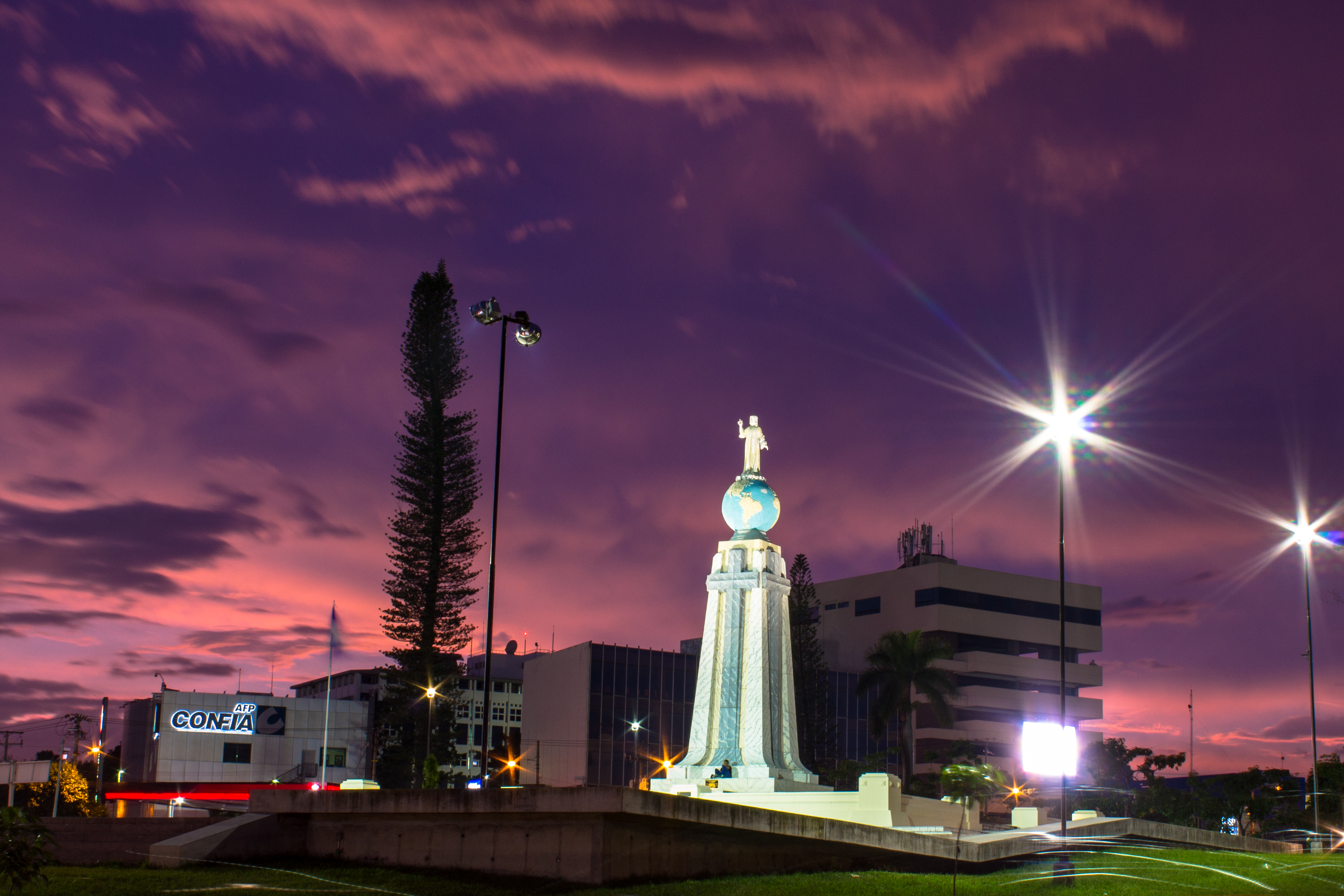
Monumento al Divino Salvador del Mundo

Previously called Plaza las Américas, it is the site of the Monumento al Divino Salvador del Mundo (Monument to the Divine Savior of the World), first erected in 1942.

This plaza was the scene of the beatification of the assassinated Archbishop of San Salvador, Óscar Romero, held on 23 May 2015.

=== Plaza Libertad ===
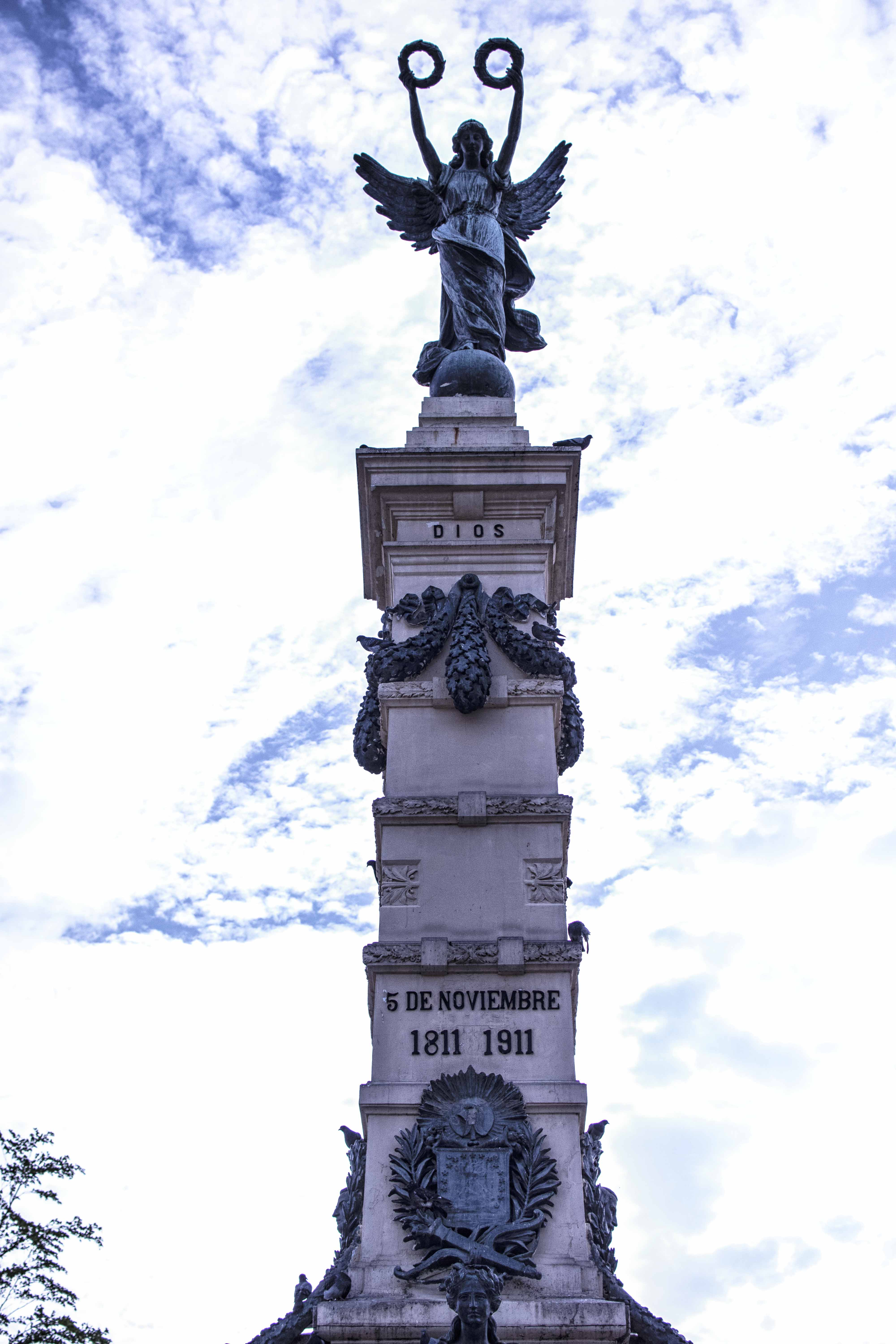
Monument in Plaza Libertad

After its founding in 1545, San Salvador grew around an empty space called "Plaza Mayor o de Armas", laid out according to the guidelines of the Cuadrícula Española (Spanish Grid). On the south side buildings were built to house institutions such as the Cabildo (city administrative offices), the post office and the public prison, and to the east, the parish church dedicated to Santísimo Salvador del Mundo (the Holy Savior of the World), now the Church El Rosario. The area became the political, economic and religious center of El Salvador in the following centuries.

Construction of the National Palace next to Bolivar Park (now Plaza Gerardo Barrios) began in the late 1860s; this was the beginning of a new city core with buildings of neo-colonial architecture. At the time the Plaza Mayor was known as Plaza Dueñas.

Plaza Libertad is the location of the Monumento de los Héroes (Monument to the Heroes), a commemoration of the centenary of the "First Cry of Independence" in 1811. The monument is crowned by an "angel of freedom" at its pinnacle holding a laurel wreath in both hands. As a consequence of increased commercial activity, the area around the plaza was enhanced with the construction of the ornate Portal la Dalia in 1915–1916 and Portal de Occidente in 1917.

=== Plaza Morazán ===
During the administration of President Rafael Zaldívar, the Salvadoran government ordered the erection of a marble statue here to commemorate the 40th anniversary (March 15, 1882) of the death of Francisco Morazán, former president of the Federal Republic of Central America. The sculpture was created by the artist Francisco Durini of Genoa, Italy. The government declared March 15 as a day of national civic celebration, and Morazán's son attended the inauguration as a representative of the Government of Honduras.

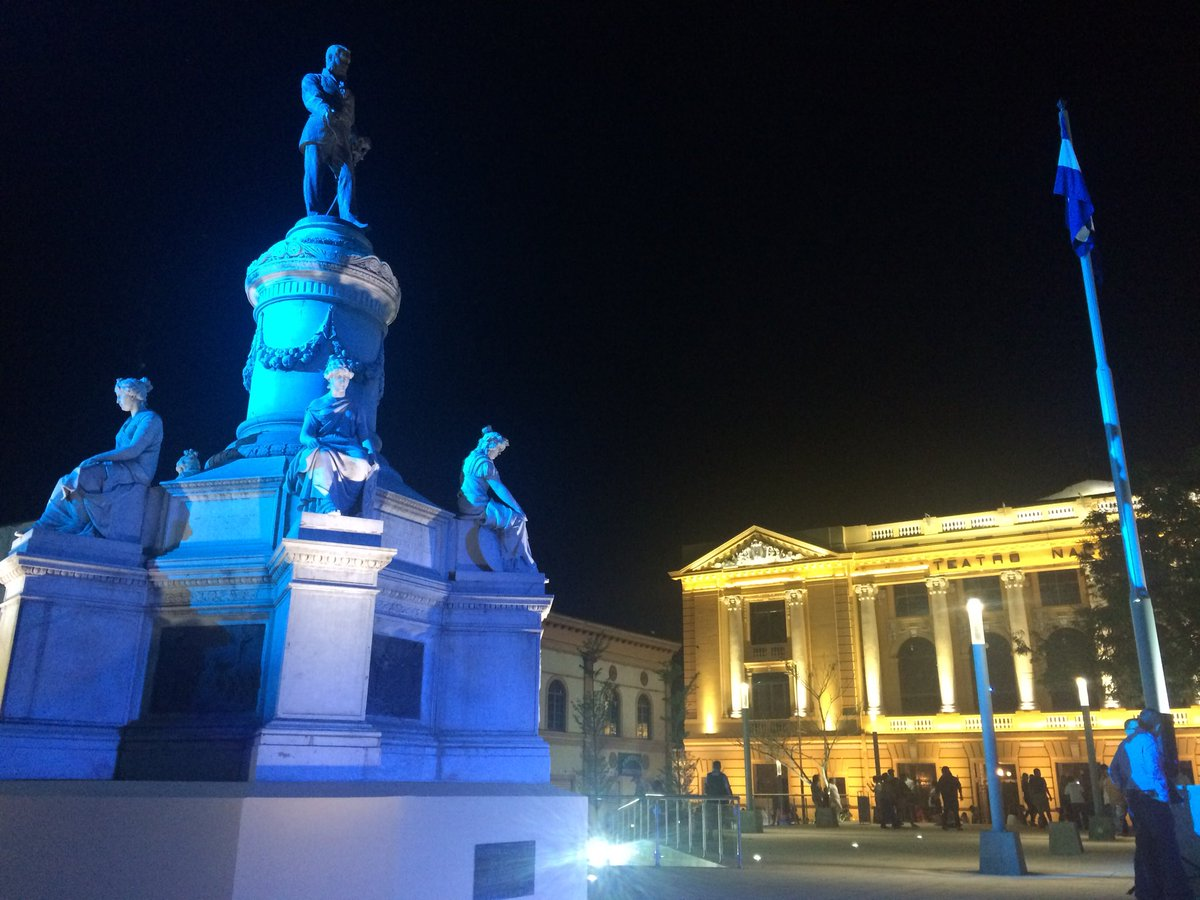
Plaza Morazán

=== Casa Dueñas ===
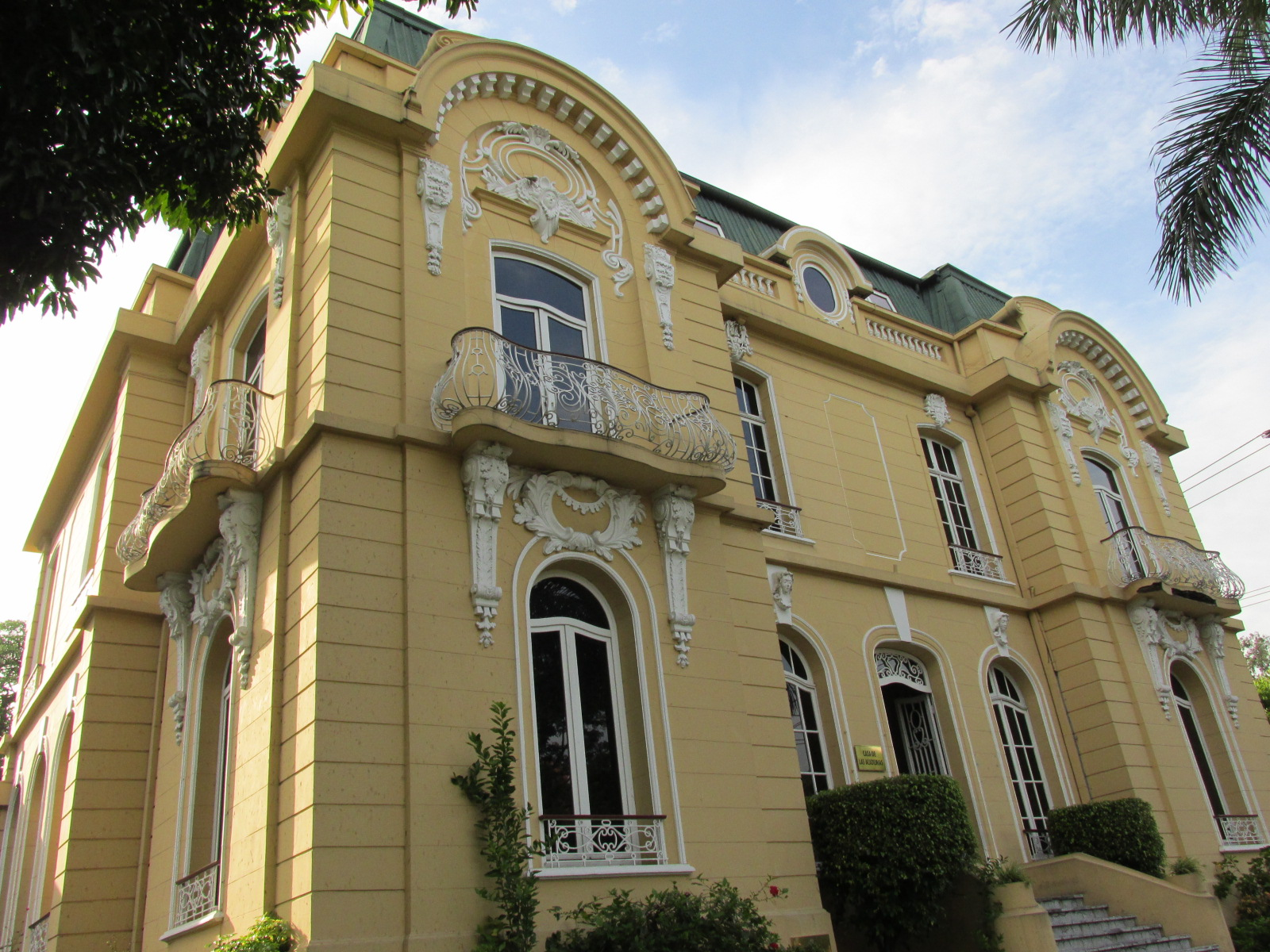
Casa Dueñas

This important residential building was built in the 1920s by coffee farmer Miguel Dueñas. The government confiscated the house in 1922 to cover the owner's debts, and it then remained unoccupied for years. From 1930 to 1933, Mexico leased the house for use by its diplomatic delegation, then from 1935 to 1957 the United States legation rented the house for its ambassadors' residence. Six successive U.S. ambassadors resided there, and occasional guests such as former Presidents Richard Nixon and Lyndon B. Johnson, Senator Robert Kennedy, and movie stars Clark Gable and Tony Curtis stayed there.

After 1957 it was the temporary headquarters of an advertising agency, then was vacated again in 1960. In 1973 the Department of Vocational Training Ministry of Labor occupied the structure; in 1986 it was declared a Cultural Asset by an Executive Agreement of May 8, 1985. The Ministry of Labor transferred the property to the authorities of the Ministry of Education, with a directive to explore the possibility of its restoration and rehabilitation. The restoration work began in 2001 under the leadership of Dr. Alfredo Martínez Moreno, former director of the Salvadorian Language Academy and the Royal Spanish Academy.
