= Nuestro Tiempo (El Salvador) =

Political party in El Salvador

Our Time Nuestro Tiempo
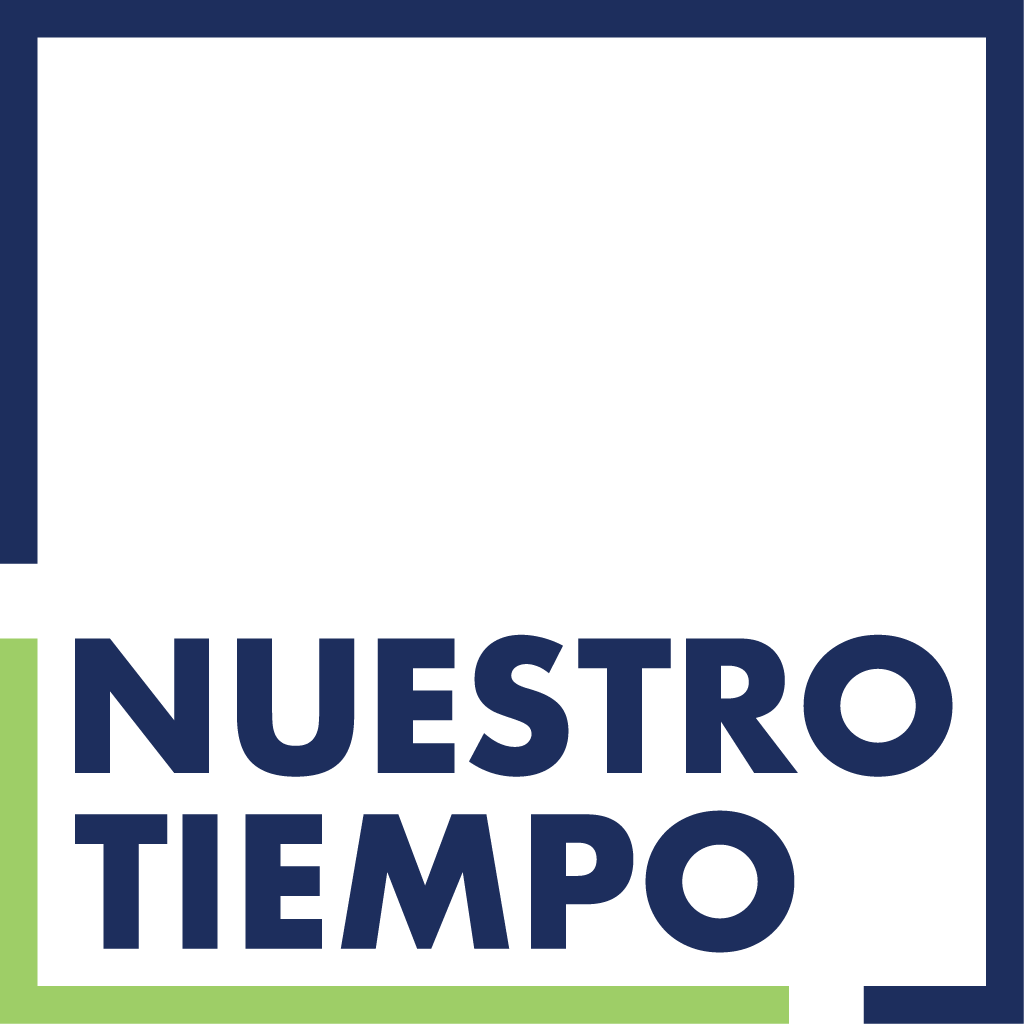
- Abbreviation: NT
- President: Andy Failer
- Founded: 2019; 7 years ago
- Headquarters: 79 Avenida Norte and 9th Calle Poniente N.616; San Salvador, El Salvador
- Ideology: Progressivism; Social liberalism
- Political position: Center to center-left
- Colors: Green; Blue
- Slogan: Es Nuestro Tiempo (English: It's Our Time)
- Seats in the Legislative Assembly: 0 / 60
- Municipalities: 0 / 44
- PARLACEN: 0 / 20

Party flag

Website
- esnuestrotiempo.com

Nuestro Tiempo (Spanish for Our Time; abbreviated NT) is a Salvadoran political party. The party was founded in 2019 and it is currently led by Andy Failer.

The party is mainly composed of a team of young adults who have not had political experience. Ideologically, the party positions itself as humanist centre, not being on the right or the left of the political spectrum, although various political analysts have placed it on the progressive left.

The party's legislative proposals include the legalization of same-sex marriage, the right of transgender people to change their gender identity, the decriminalization and legalization of abortion, and the withdrawal of El Salvador from the Central American Parliament.

The party's headquarters is located at 79 Avenida Norte and 9th Calle Poniente N.616 in the Colonia Escalón district of San Salvador, the country's capital city.

== History ==
=== 2021 legislative election ===
Nuestro Tiempo first participated in an election during the 2021 legislative election. The party held its primary elections on 19 July 2020. Nuestro Tiempo won 1 seat in the Legislative Assembly. It failed to win any municipality and it did not participate in the election for the Central American Parliament (PARLACEN). John Tennant Wright Sol was the party's sole deputy in the Legislative Assembly, being elected from San Salvador.

=== 2024 elections ===
In February 2023, Wright stated that he would not seek re-election to a second term as a deputy of the Legislative Assembly.

Andy Failer, the president of Nuestro Tiempo, stated that the party was open to forming coalitions with other parties for the 2024 legislative election, but that it would not form coalitions with the Nationalist Republican Alliance (ARENA) or the Farabundo Martí National Liberation Front (FMLN). In May 2022, the El Faro digital newspaper alleged that ARENA, the FMLN, Vamos, and Nuestro Tiempo were negotiating to form a single presidential campaign to oppose incumbent president Nayib Bukele's re-election campaign. Nuestro Tiempo responded by reiterating that it would not form a coalition with ARENA or the FMLN.

Failer stated that Nuestro Tiempo would present presidential and vice presidential candidates. On 1 June 2023, Failer stated that Luis Parada and Celia Medrano had registered with the party to run as its presidential and vice presidential candidates, respectively. Failer's announcement came the day after Parada and Medrano announced their electoral campaign with the Sumar por El Salvador political movement. On 15 July 2023, Nuestro Tiempo held its primary elections. Parada and Medrano were confirmed as the party's presidential and vice presidential candidates, respectively. The party also elected 18 municipal candidates and 40 deputy candidates in seven departments. Like in the 2021 election, Nuestro Tiempo dud not participate in the PARLACEN elections as the party believes that PARLACEN is a waste of the government's resources.

As Nuestro Tiempo failed to receive more than 50,000 votes in the 2024 legislative election, the TSE began the process to deregister the party on 11 April 2024.

== Party leadership ==
On 12 March 2023, Nuestro Tiempo held party leadership elections, during which, Failer succeeded Juan Valiente as the party's president.

Nuestro Tiempo describes itself as a "group of citizens, prepared to complete a common objective: transform our country and the lives of the citizens" ("grupo de ciudadanos, preparados para cumplir un objetivo común: transformar nuestro país y las vidas de los ciudadanos").

== Electoral history ==
=== Presidential elections ===
Election	Candidate	First round			Second round			Result	Ref.
Election	Candidate	Votes	%	Pos.	Votes	%	Pos.	Result	Ref.
2024	Luis Parada	65,076	2.06%	▲4th	–			Lost ✗	

=== Parliamentary elections ===
Election	Votes	%	Position	Seats	+/–	Status in legislature	Ref.
2021	44,401	1.70	▲7th	1 / 84	New	Opposition	
2024	41,060	1.32	▼9th	0 / 60	▼1	Extraparliamentary	

=== Municipal elections ===
Election	Votes	%	Position	Seats	+/–	Ref.
2021	11,426	0.45	▲9th	0 / 262	New	
2024	15,202	0.94	9th	0 / 44	0	

=== PARLACEN elections ===
Election	Votes	%	Position	Seats	+/–	Ref.
2021	Did not participate					
2024	Did not participate					

== See also ==
- List of political parties in El Salvador
- Politics of El Salvador
