= Johnny Wright Sol =

Salvadoran politician

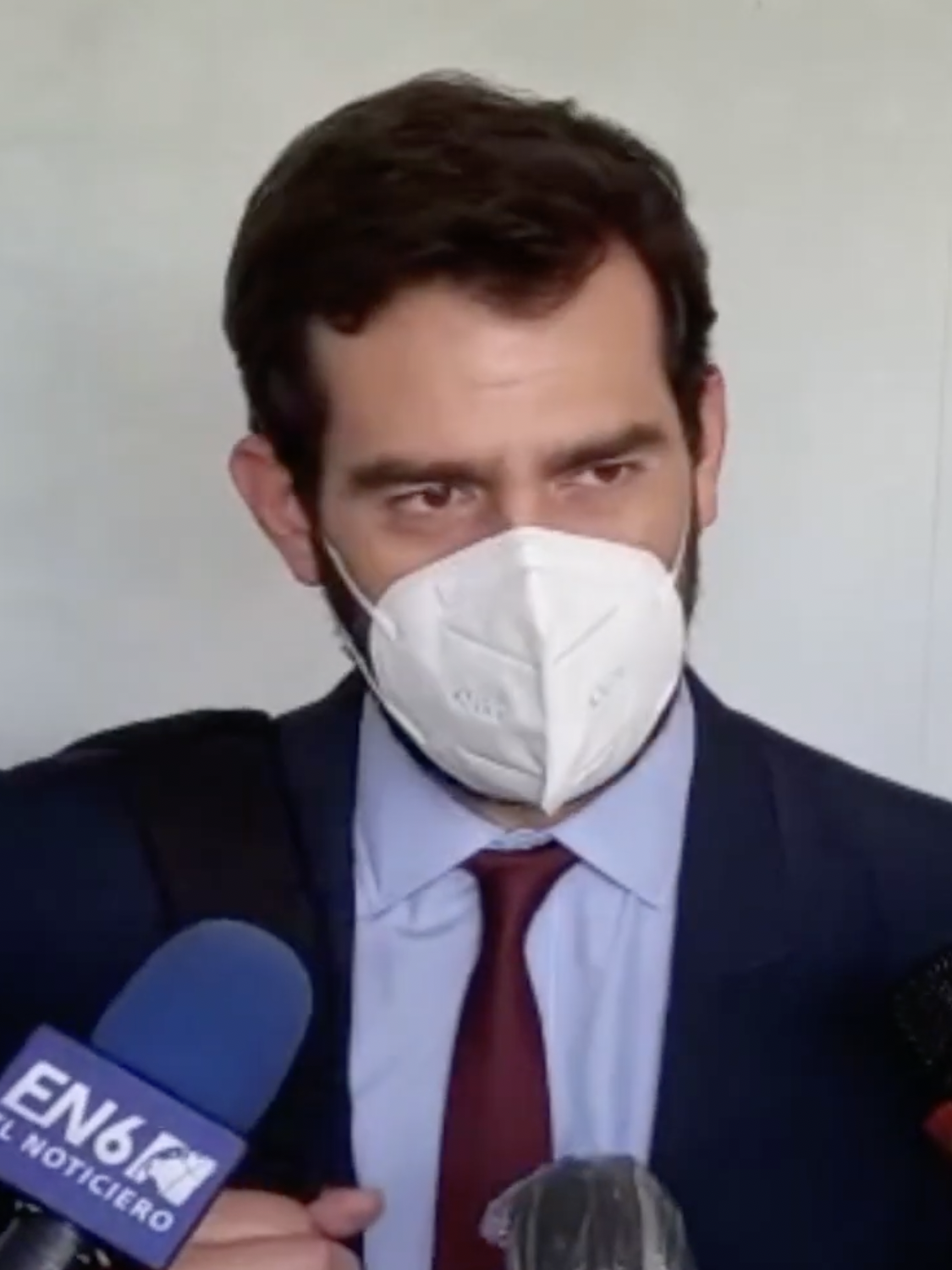
- Wright in 2021

Deputy of the Legislative Assembly of El Salvador from San Salvador
- In office 1 May 2021 – 1 May 2024
- In office 1 May 2015 – 1 May 2018

Personal details
- Party: Nationalist Republican Alliance (until 2017); Independent (2017–2019); Nuestro Tiempo (since 2019)
- Domestic partner: Colin King
- Education: George Washington University; IE Business School
- Occupation: Politician, firefighter

John Tennant Wright Sol is a Salvadoran politician who served as a deputy of the Legislative Assembly of El Salvador from 2015 to 2018 and 2021 to 2024. He was a member of the Nationalist Republican Alliance (ARENA) and later Nuestro Tiempo, a party he co-founded with Juan Valiente. He was the first openly gay deputy in Salvadoran history.
