= Centro Comercial Galerias =

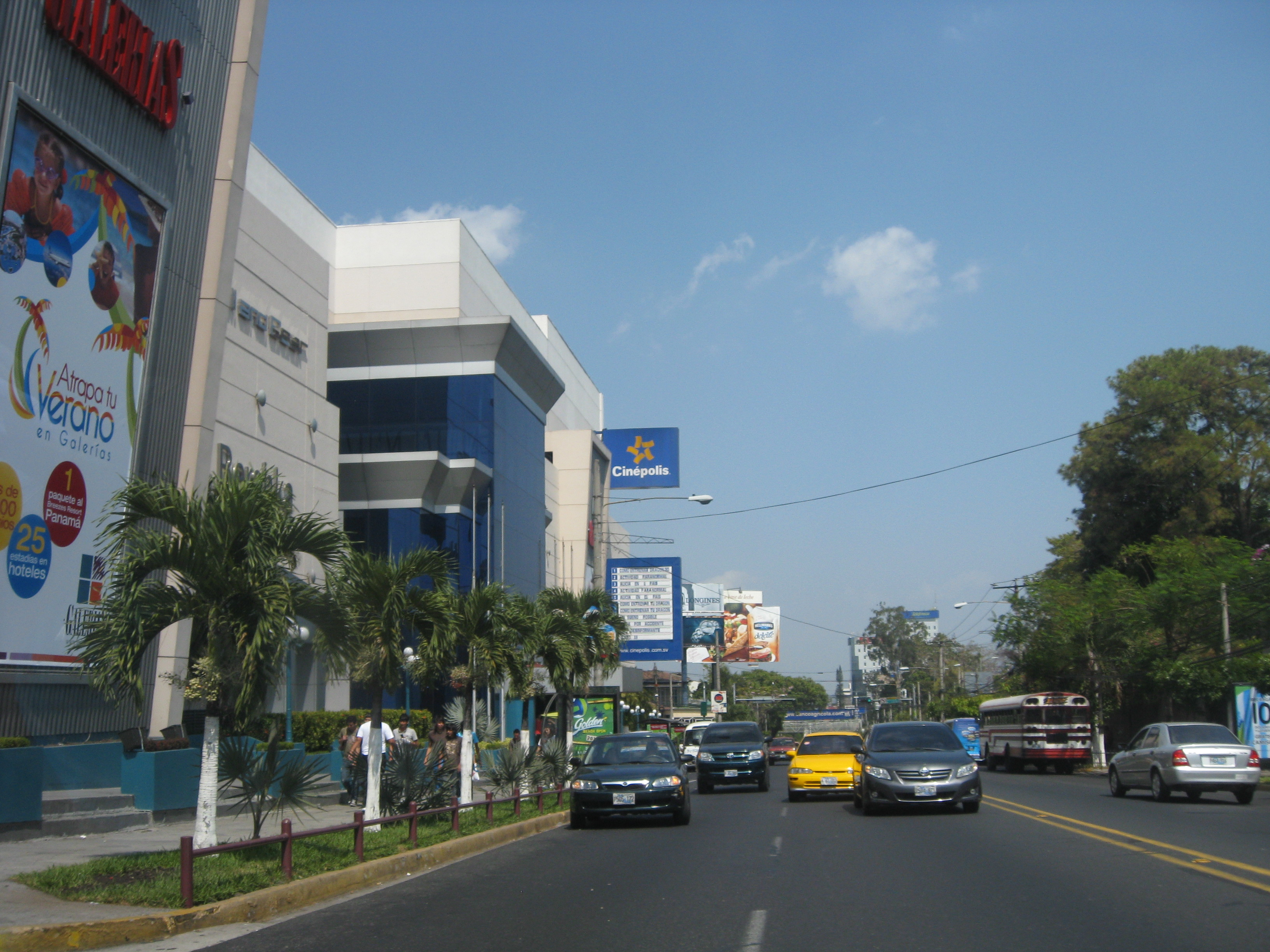
- Lateral view of the mall
- Interactive map of the Centro Comercial Galerias area
- Alternative names: Galerias

General information
- Type: Shopping mall
- Location: Paseo General Escalón #3700, San Salvador, El Salvador
- Coordinates: 13°42′08″N 89°13′48″W
- Inaugurated: 1995
- Owner: Grupo Siman

Technical details
- Floor count: 4

Website
- http://www.galerias.com.sv

The Centro Comercial Galerias is a shopping center in San Salvador, El Salvador. Among the mall's attractions is a mansion known as La Casona dating from the late 1950s and kept in perfect condition, which was home to a family of Palestinian origin. It is the only mall to have such an attraction. The complex is owned by Grupo Siman.

== History ==
The idea of building the mall, born in early 1990 due to the great development and strength of the capital, its construction lasted almost four years and was responsible for SIMCO (sister company Almacenes Siman business group), the first excavations were conducted in order to shape the three levels of underground parking currently to the mall.

One of the main challenges for the construction of the mall was to maintain the mansion called Casona, as more than 2,000 workers had to take extreme security measures to avoid damaging the European architecture.

With the help of a Swiss company, managed to build a ring of security that would protect the mansion, as the excavation depth of 12 meters jeopardized the work.

In 2006 it made its biggest remodeling, where one floor was built (in addition to the three with which the count) and was adapted for cinema Cinépolis Mexican chain.

== See also ==
- Siman
