= Zona Rosa (San Salvador) =

Area in San Salvador, El Salvador

The Zona Rosa is an area in San Salvador, El Salvador.

== San Benito suburb ==
It was created in 1946 with a design inspired by the European and North American Garden city movement.

In the early 1980s a process of commercialization of the area began, replacing the houses located on Boulevard del Hipódromo with restaurants and bars, and since then the area has been known by the name of Zona Rosa.

== Remodeling ==
In 2010 remodeling and modernization work of Zona Rosa began which consisted of construction of a central flower bed that connected the traffic circles Italia and Brasilia, as well as planting palm trees, adding LED lighting, construction of access ramps for disabled people and the remodeling of the public squares. Surveillance cameras and police points were added as well.

This remodeling earned a recognition by the International Down Town Association as the first "Special Improvement District in Central America".

== Hotels ==
The Zona Rosa has several hotels, both national and international chains, which include Villa Serena, Villa Florencia, Hotel Las Magnolias, Sheraton Presidente and Hilton Princess.

== Bars, Restaurants y Cafes ==
The area also has several restaurants of fast and casual dining, clubs, bars and cafes. International brands include Papa John's Pizza, Domino's Pizza, Pizza Hut, McDonald's, Denny's, Tony Roma's, and others include La Pampa, Gourmet Burguer Company, Inka Grill, Maki Sushi, Shaw's, Crepe Lovers, Paradise, Green House, Antique Club, Republik, Zanzibar, Code, 503 Restaurant and Champagne Lounge, Marquee, Alive and many others.

== Museums ==
In the area are two of the country's most important museums, which are the National Museum of Anthropology Dr. David J. Guzmán and the Art Museum of El Salvador.

== Monument to the Revolution ==
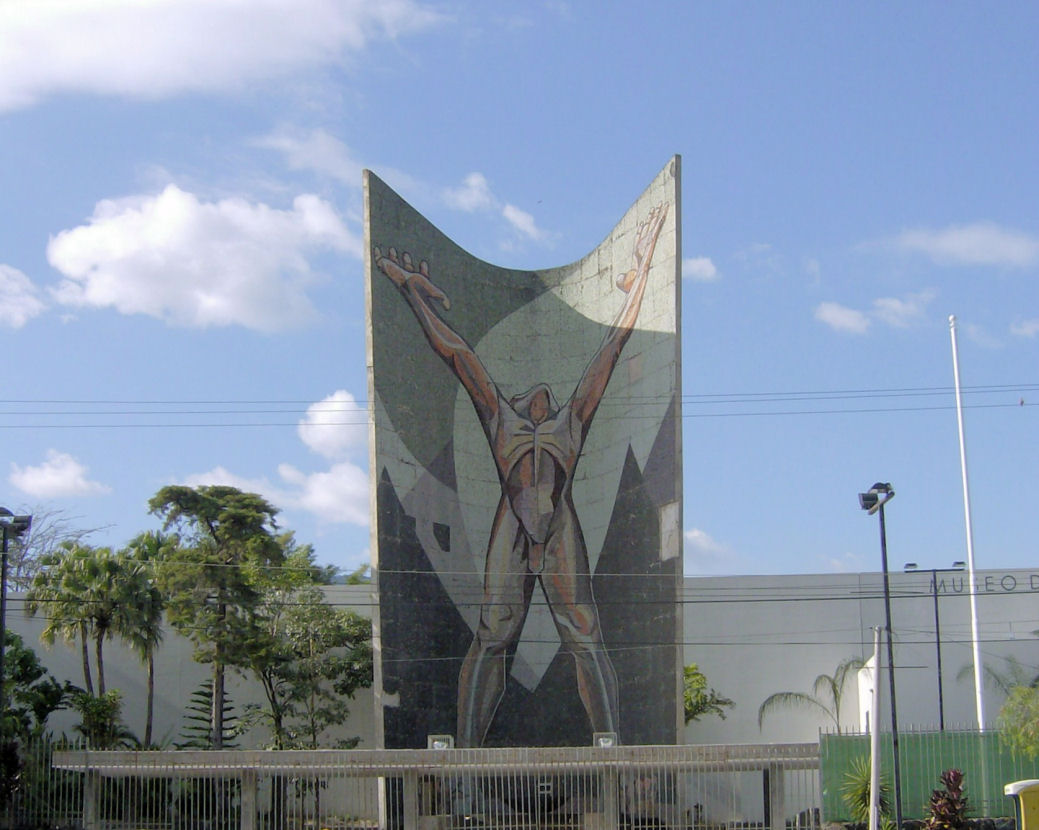
Monument to the Revolution located in front of the Art Museum of El Salvador

The Monument to the Revolution is the area too. The construction began during the administration of Colonel Oscar Osorio to commemorate the uprising that ousted General Salvador Castaneda Castro from the power in 1948. It was completed in the administration of Colonel José María Lemus.

== Embassies ==
The zone is also the home of several embassies:

- Embassy of Brazil
- Embassy of Spain
- Embassy of Mexico
- Embassy of Italy
- Embassy of Uruguay
- Embassy of Dominican Republic

== Residential Area ==
The area also has many residences, some of which have been modified to become in restaurants or nightclubs, however, there are two towers complex with luxury apartments overlooking the entire area.

One residential tower is Alisios 115, a Groupo Bolívar Property. It is 96 meters high and consists of 26 floors of luxurious apartments. It is the third highest tower in El Salvador and the fourth in Central America excluding Panama. There are other towers as well, such as Torres 105 Campestre, Torre 525 Avenida La Capilla, Torre 515 Avenida La Capilla and Torre 370 Avenida La Capilla.

== International Center of Fairs and Conventions (CIFCO) ==
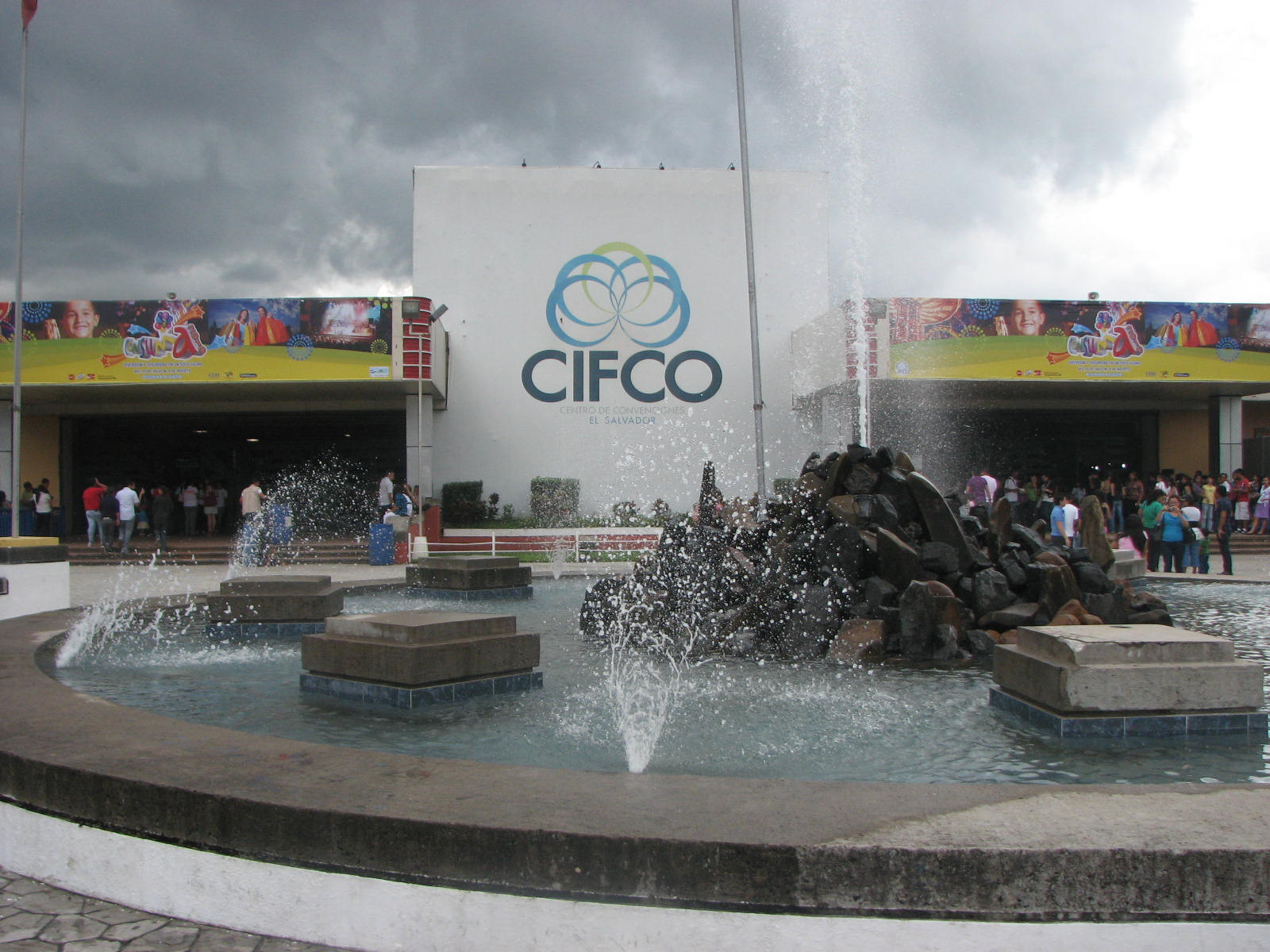
International Center of Fairs and Conventions (CIFCO) In Consuma 2010

The area also has an amphitheater with capacity for 15 thousand people, the Central American Hall, 12 multipurpose halls, a mall area and parking for up to 800 vehicles.
