= Plaza Mundo =

Shopping mall chain

Coordinates: 13.6980°N 89.1505°W

- Industry: Commercial real estate
- Founded: 2003
- Headquarters: El Salvador
- Parent: Grupo Agrisal
- Website: https://plazamundo.com.sv

Plaza Mundo is a chain of shopping malls owned by real estate group Grupo Agrisal, which is headquartered in El Salvador. As of 2023, Plaza Mundo has two shopping malls located in Soyapango, Apopa and Usulután.

== History ==
Plaza Mundo first opened in Soyapango on October 28, 2003. In early 2019, Plaza Mundo's parent company, Grupo Agrisal, invested around 60 million dollars for a second location in Apopa. On October 30, 2020, Plaza Mundo opened its second location in Apopa. In early 2023, Grupo Agrisal invested in more than 50 million dollars for their third location in Usulután, which is set to be open in early 2024.
