= Metrocentro =

- Founded: 1970

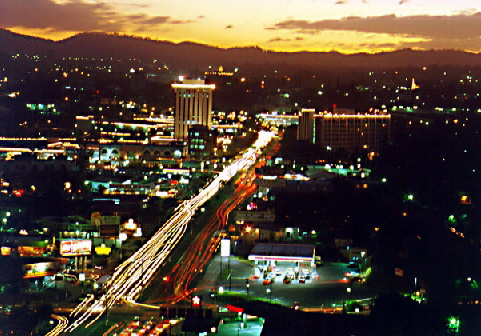
Metrocentro in San Salvador.

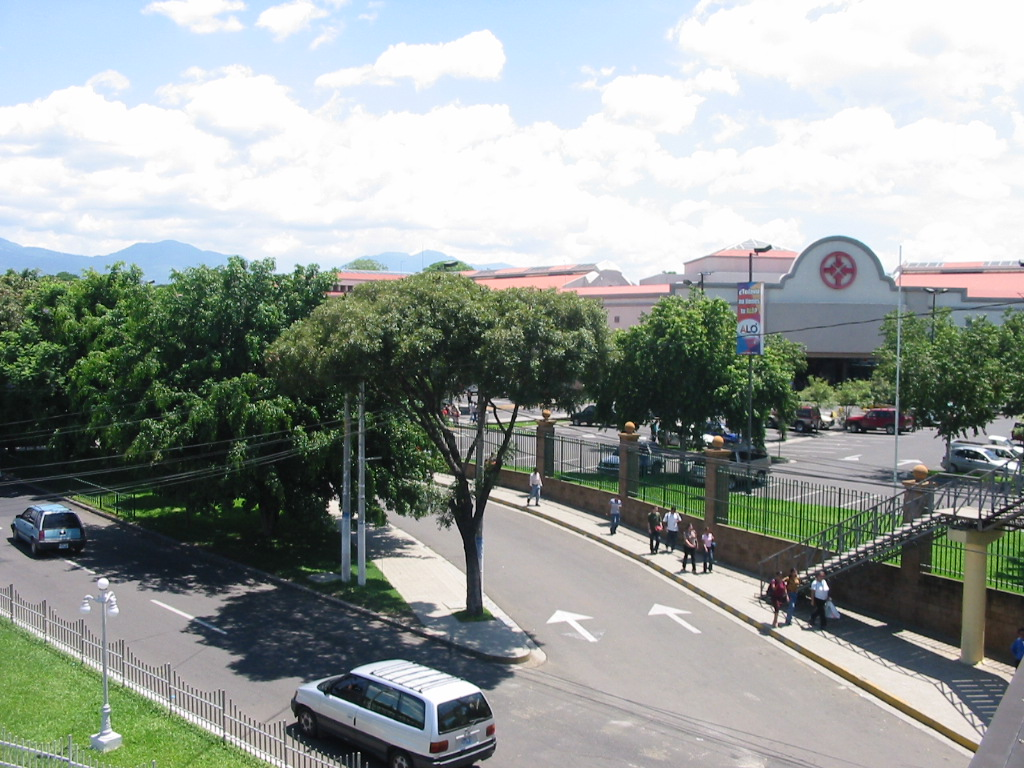
Metrocentro Santa Ana, El Salvador.

Metrocentro is a Salvadoran shopping mall chain in Central America.

== History and organisation ==
Metrocentro is owned by Grupo Roble, which is based in San Salvador, El Salvador. The shopping mall Metrocentro in San Salvador is the largest shopping center in El Salvador. It was the first Metrocentro and opened in 1971.

There are Metrocentros in:

- Santa Ana, El Salvador
- San Miguel, El Salvador
- San Salvador, El Salvador
- Sonsonate, El Salvador
- Managua, Nicaragua
- Villa Nueva, Guatemala
