= Monumento al Divino Salvador del Mundo =

Salvadoran national monument

Monument to the Divine Savior of the World
- Monumento al Divino Salvador del Mundo (Spanish)
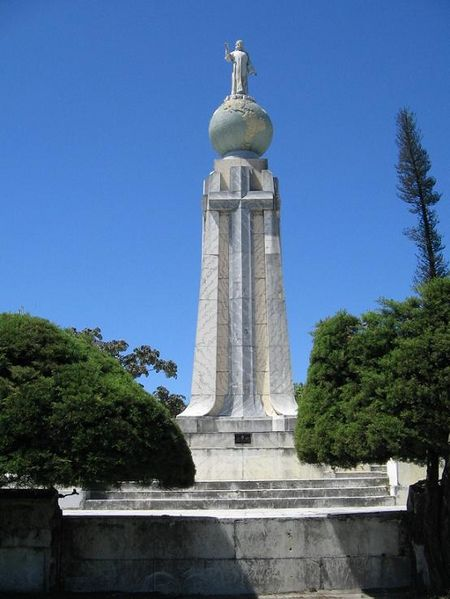
- Front view of the monument

- Location within El Salvador
- 13°42′5″N 89°13′28″W
- Location: San Salvador, El Salvador

History
- Built: 26 November 1942

Site notes
- Elevation: 658 metres (2,159 ft)
- Height: 18 metres (59 ft)
- Area: 11,241 square metres (2.778 acres)
- Architect: Carlos Varaona Villaseñor
- Restored: 1986–1987 and 2010
- Restored by: Levantemos el alma salvadoreña campaign after the earthquake (1986–1987); Grupo Roble (2010)

Monumento al Divino Salvador del Mundo (English: Monument to the Divine Savior of the World) is a monument located on Plaza El Salvador del Mundo (The Savior of the World Plaza) in San Salvador, El Salvador. It consists of a statue of Jesus Christ standing on top of a global sphere of planet Earth, placed on top of the tall four-sided concrete base pedestal. It is a landmark located in the country's capital San Salvador. It is a symbol that identifies and represents both El Salvador and Salvadorans throughout the world.

== History ==
The monument was built on a pedestal originally used to decorate the tomb of Manuel Enrique Araujo, the President of El Salvador between 1911 and 1913, and presented by Araujo's family on 26 November 1942 in connection to the first National Eucharistic Congress in San Salvador. The iconic statue of Christ on the globe sphere of planet Earth is part of the Monument to Divino Salvador del Mundo on Plaza El Salvador del Mundo (The Savior of the World Plaza).

The statue was damaged in the 1986 San Salvador earthquake. It was rebuilt and put back in place months after the campaign "Lift up your soul Salvadoran". In front of the plaza, there is a statue lifted in memory of Oscar Arnulfo Romero. On the other side, from that area, it is customary to begin the march of floats during the celebration of the festivities of the city.

== Remodelling ==
The plaza was completely remodeled and entirely upgraded in 2010. As part of the reorganization plan to improve the image of San Salvador, mayor Norman Quijano made the remodeling and renaming of Plaza las Americas, now named Plaza Salvador del Mundo. The renovation work included the complete renovation of sidewalks, the stands and the area of the flags. The image of Christ, placed about 18 m high, was also revamped with new paint.

== Gallery ==
Aerial view of Plaza El Salvador del Mundo (The Savior of the World Plaza).

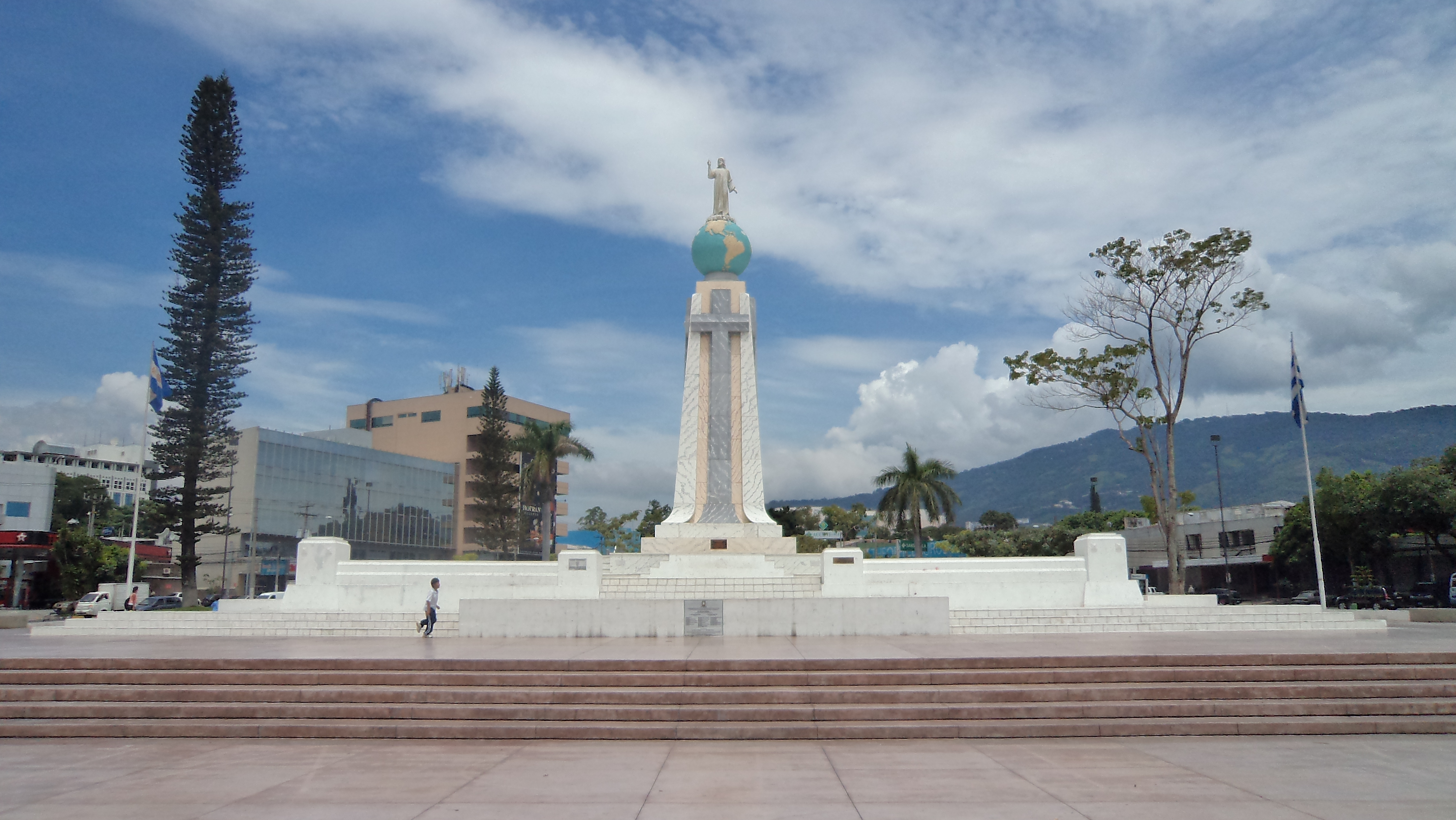
Frontal view of the monument.

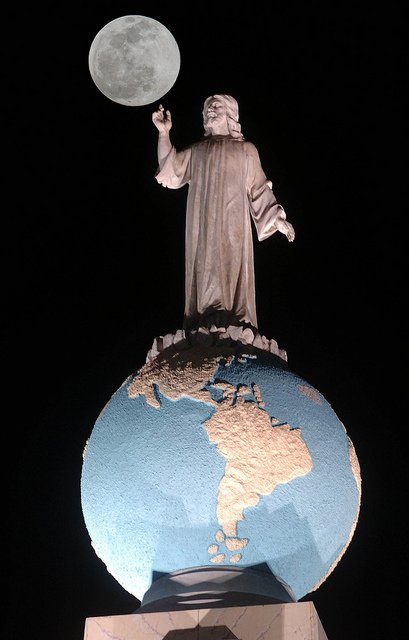
The Jesus Christ statue on top of the globe sphere of planet Earth on a full moon night.

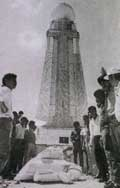
Salvadorans observe the collapsed statue of the monument after it toppled during the great 1986 San Salvador earthquake.

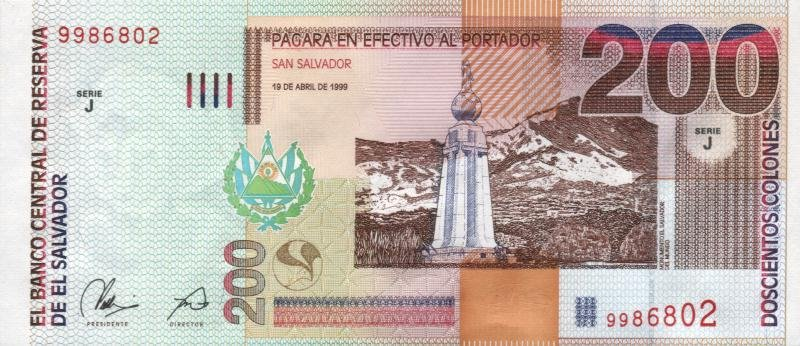
Illustration of the monument on the reverse of the 200 colón banknote.

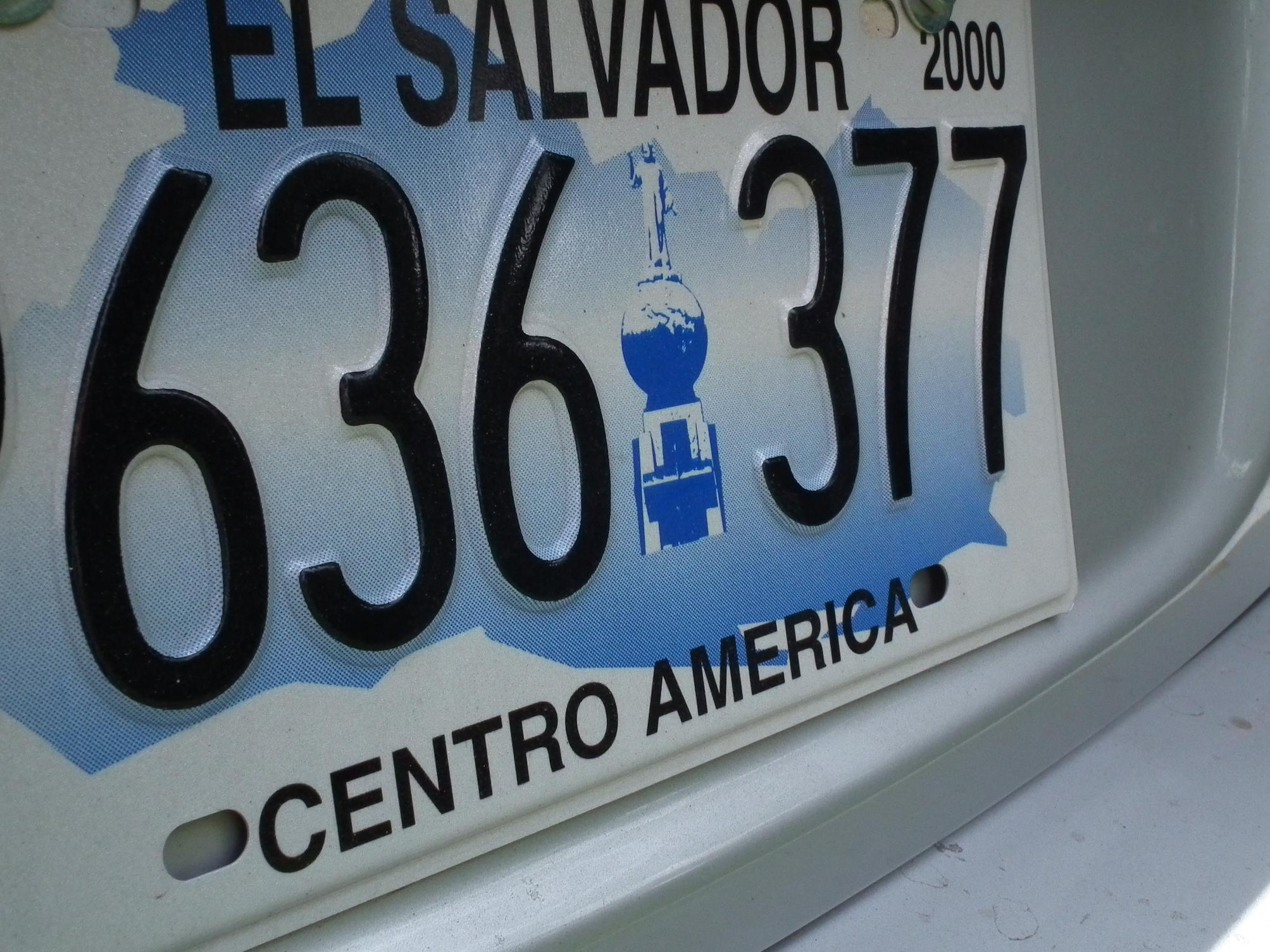
The monument featured on the El Salvador license plate.

== See also ==
- List of statues of Jesus
