= Edificio Avante =

El Salvador Skyscraper

Coordinates: 13.6616°N 89.25151°W

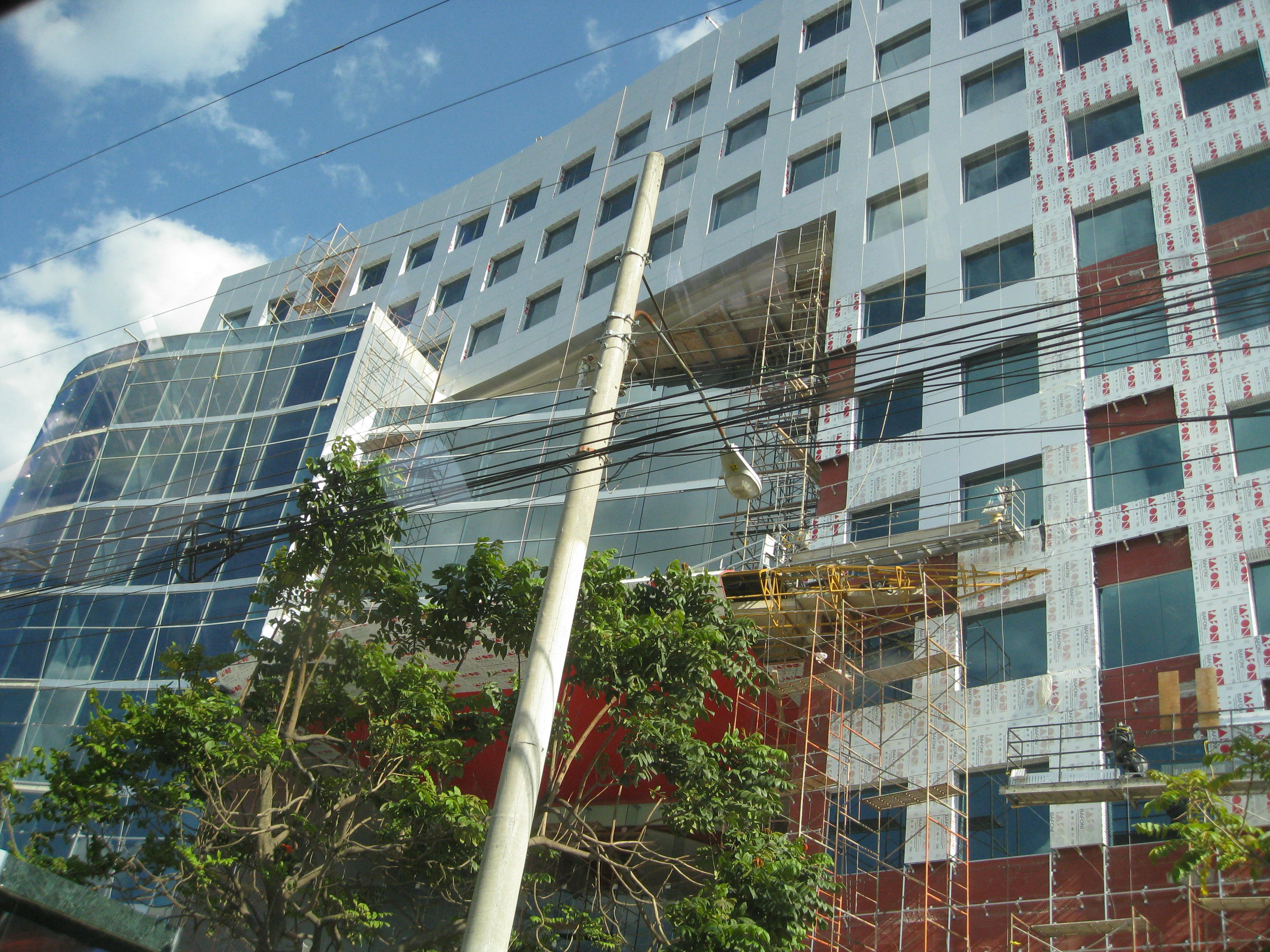
Edificio Avante

Edificio Avante is a 64 m (210 ft) skyscraper located in the Santa Elena area of San Salvador, El Salvador. Construction started in early 2009 and was due to finish in mid-2010.

The US$30 million building has a total area of 44,000 m^{2} (470,000 sq ft) and space for shops on the ground floor, offices on the nine floors above and six levels of underground parking – the deepest parking in El Salvador.

The building was financed by a Guatemalan investor, using a financing scheme called "tenant in hand", because they sell the space to investors, then Quality Real Estate is responsible for seeking a tenant for that space, so the constructors of Avante made sure all of their investors a safe return. Salvadorans who have been investors in Guatemala already know the model of Avante.

This building helps the economic growth of the country; due to the low quantity of office buildings in the country the building helps the economic boom of the city.
