= List of cities in El Salvador =

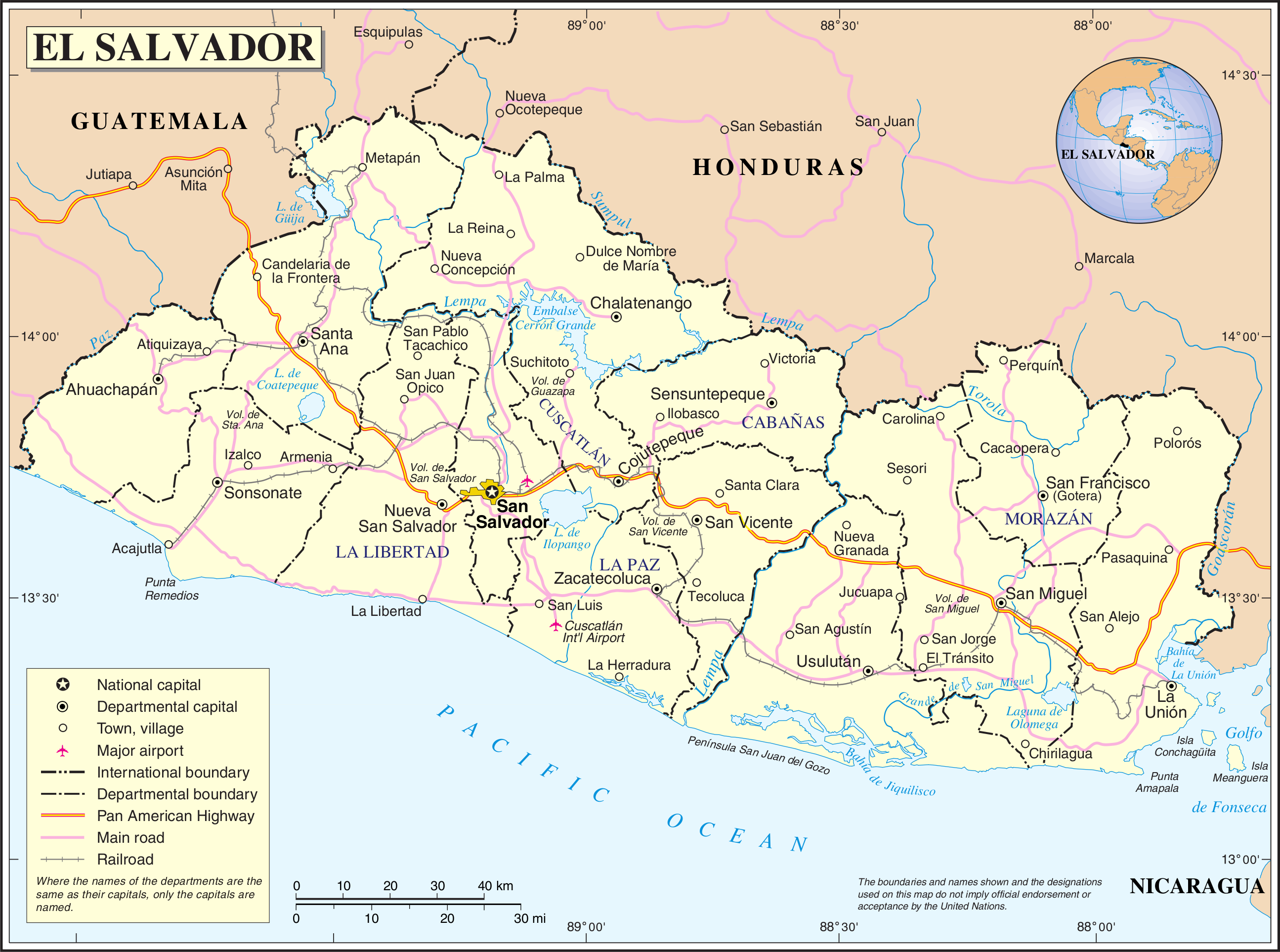
A map of El Salvador

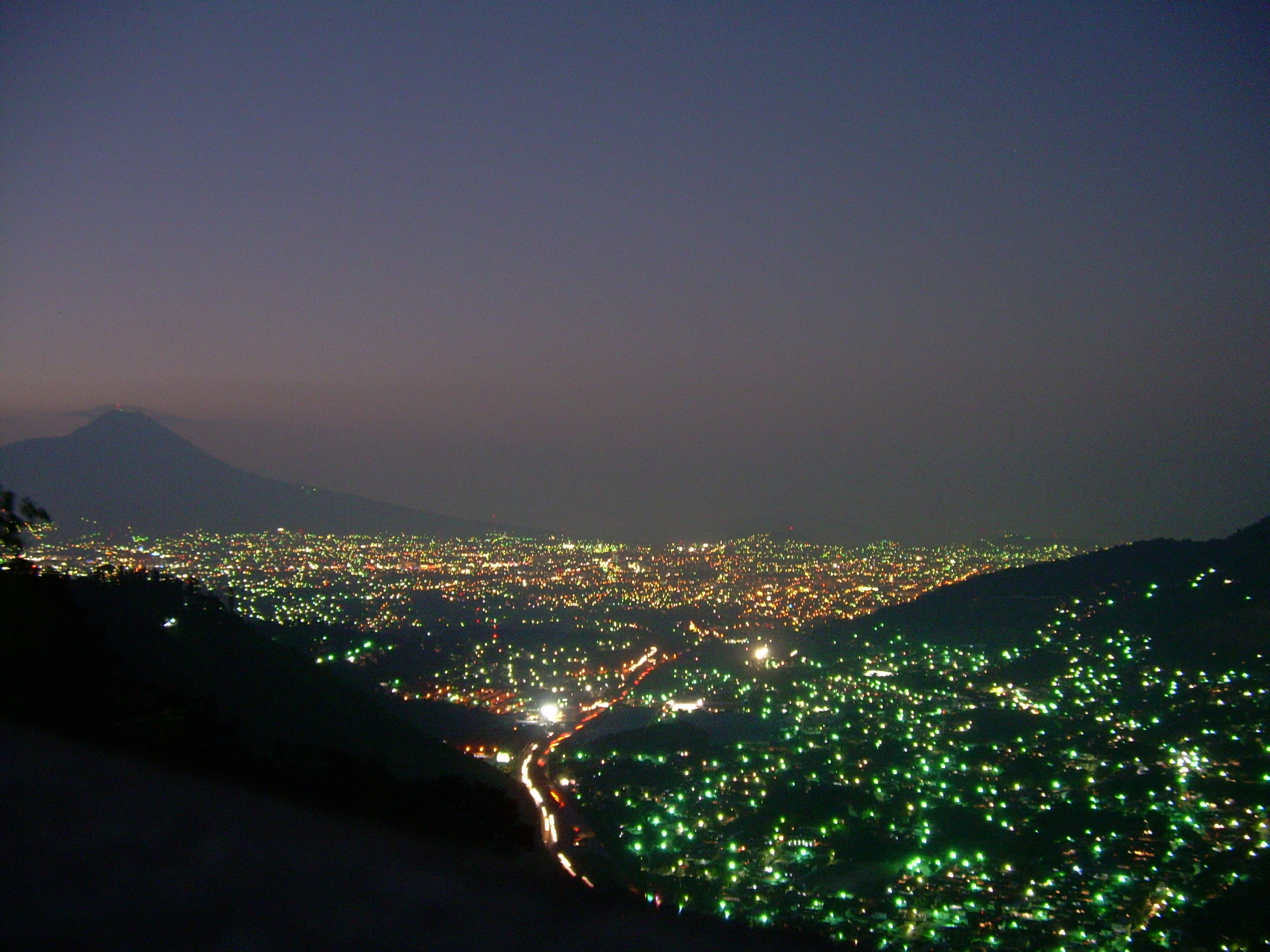
The San Salvador Metropolitan Area.

This article shows a list of major cities, towns, and villages in El Salvador.

== Cities ==
City population figures below are from the World Population Review from 2024. Cities listed have a population of over 100,000, a high Human Development Index (HDI), and high rate of urbanization.

Cities by Population
City	Population	Notes
Acajutla	22,763	
Apopa	112,158	AMSS^{‡}
Antiguo Cuscatlán	33,767	AMSS; highest HDI in the country
Ciudad Delgado	71,594	AMSS
Nuevo Cuscatlán	12,699	
Cojutepeque	48,411	Most important city in the department of Cuscatlán department
Colón	130,513	Most populated city in the department of La Libertad department
Cuscatancingo	44,369	AMSS
San Juan Opico	97,210	Third and last most populated city in the department of La Libertad department
Ilopango	39,890	AMSS
Jiquilisco	9,129	AMSS
La Unión	26,807	
Mejicanos	160,317	AMSS
Metapán	19,143	
San Marcos	54,615	
San Martin	39,361	AMSS
San Miguel	161,880	
San Salvador	525,990	Capital city; Metropolitan size as of May 2024: 1,575,489
San Vicente	41,504	
Santa Tecla	124,694	Second most populated city in the department of La Libertad department AMSS
Santa Ana	176,661	
Sonsonate	59,468	
Soyapango	329,708	AMSS
Usulután	66,125	

Key
‡	Denotes the city is incorporated into the San Salvador Metropolitan Area

== Towns ==
Towns listed have a population over 50,000, a medium to low urbanization, a low departmental capital, or medium to low HDI.

Towns by Population
Town	Population	Notes
Ahuachapán	110,511	Capital municipality of the Ahuachapán Department of El Salvador
Chalatenango	28,271	Capital municipality of the Chalatenango Department of El Salvador
Nejapa	50,966	San Salvador Metropolitan Area
Tacuba	50,000	
Zacatecoluca	62,576	

== Villages ==
Villages listed have a population within the range of 1,001 to 49,999, have a very low urbanization, or a very low HDI.

Villages by Population
City	Population	Notes
Alegría	15,000	
Arambala	1,821	
Apaneca	8,597	
Berlín	15,000	Not to be confused with the capital of Germany, Berlin.
Chirilagua	24,000	
Comasagua	11,870	
Conchagua	37,362	Also the name of the region of two stratovolcanoes in El Salvador.
Concepción de Ataco	18,101	
Juayúa	24,465	
Jujutla	39,596	
La Palma	24,000	
Nahuizalco	49,081	
Santa Rosa de Lima	27,693	
Suchitoto	24,786	

== See also ==
- Municipalities of El Salvador
- Geography of El Salvador
- Salvadoran Departments by HDI
