= List of largest cities in Central America =

The two lists of the largest cities in Central America given below are based on two different definitions of a city, the urban agglomeration, and the city proper. In both lists Central America is defined as consisting of Belize, Guatemala, Honduras, El Salvador, Nicaragua, Costa Rica and Panama. All estimates and projections given have a reference date of mid-2015.

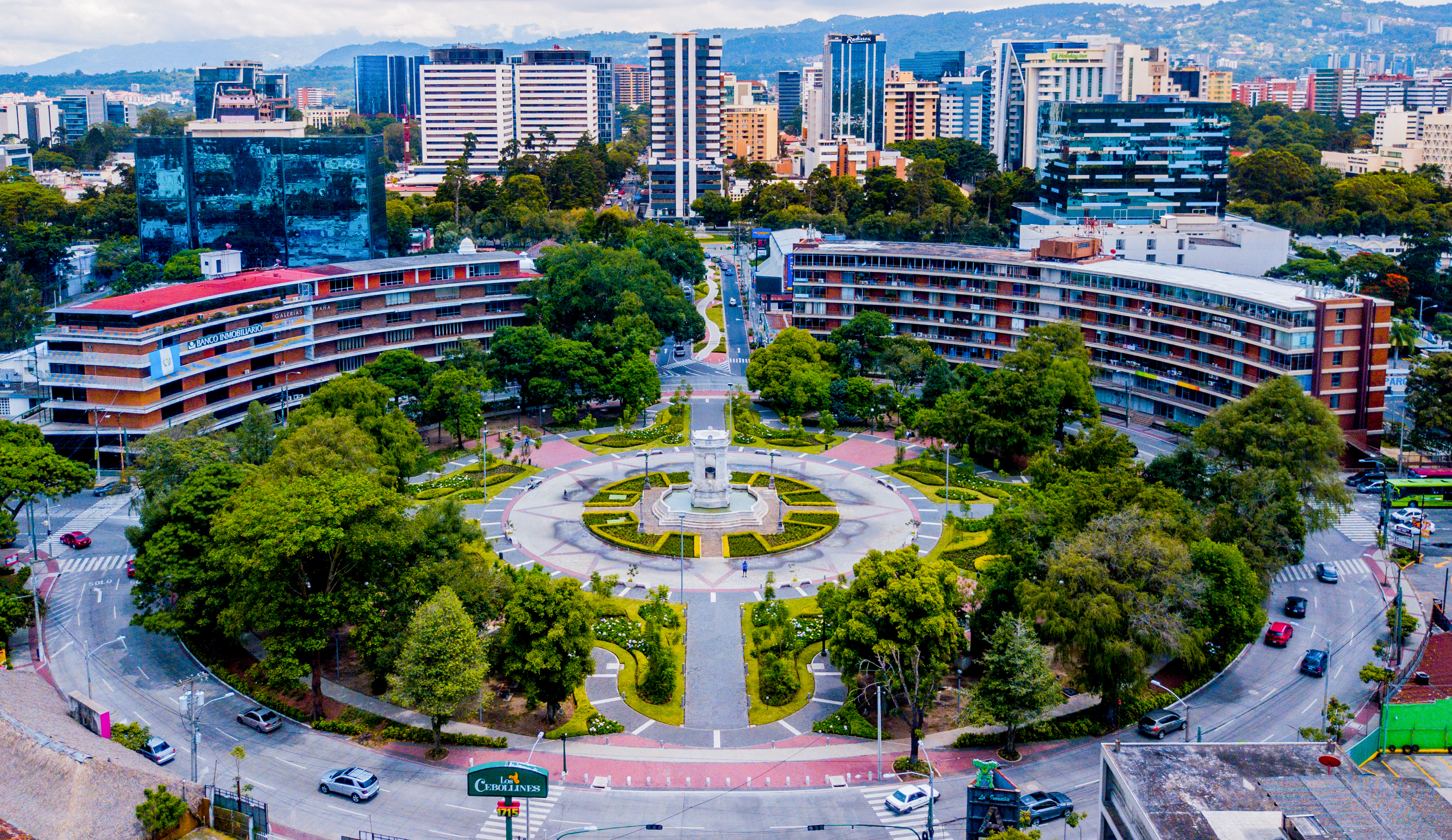
Guatemala City, the largest urban agglomeration in Central America

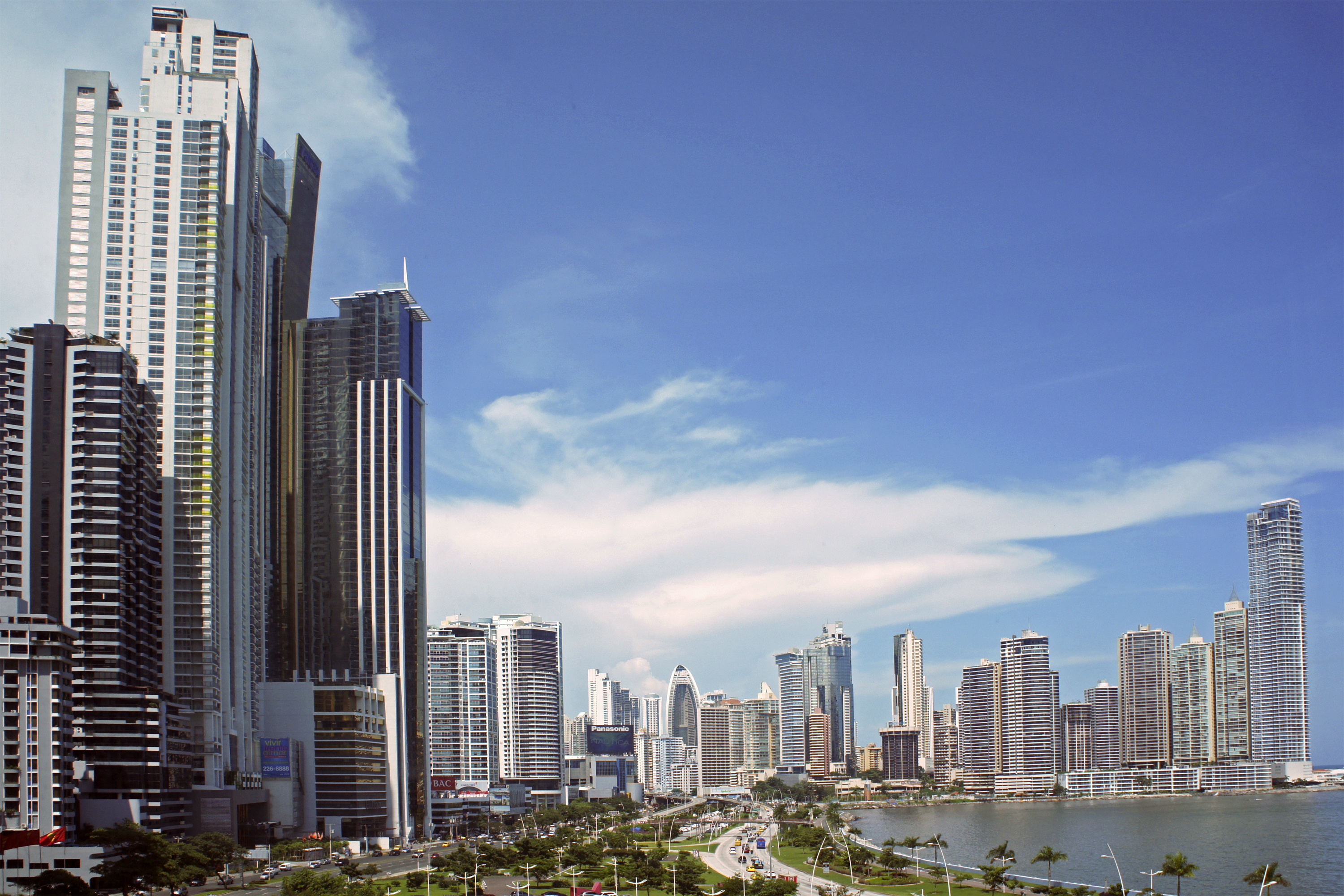
Panama City, the second largest agglomeration in Central America

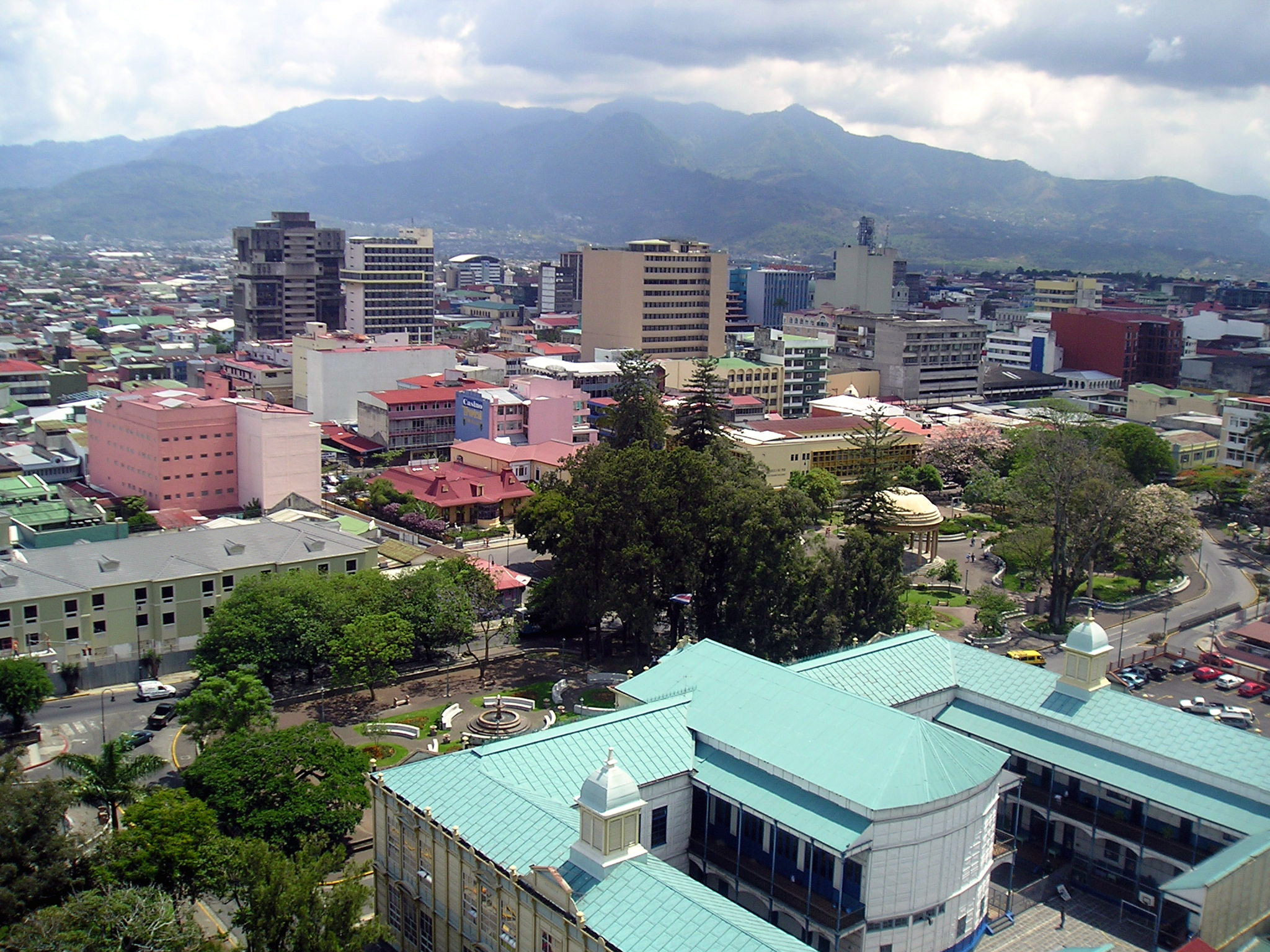
San José, the third largest agglomeration in Central America

== Largest cities proper ==
All cities proper with a population of 200,000 or more are included.

#	City	Population	Country	Year
1	Tegucigalpa	1,326,460	Honduras	2023
2	Guatemala City	1,221,739	Guatemala	2023
3	Managua	1,055,111	Nicaragua	2023
4	San Pedro Sula	701,200	Honduras	2023
5	Mixco	527,828	Guatemala	2023
6	Villa Nueva	492,480	Guatemala	2023
7	Panama City	468,843	Panama	2023 (Note: Panama's National Statistics and Census Institute (INEC) defines the city proper of Panama City as comprising the corregimientos of San Felipe, El Chorrillo, Santa Ana, Calidonia, Curundú, Betania, Bella Vista, Pueblo Nuevo, San Francisco, Parque Lefevre, Río Abajo, Juan Diaz and Pedregal.)
8	San José	352,381	Costa Rica	2022
9	San Salvador	330,543	El Salvador	2024
10	San Miguelito	280,777	Panama	2024
11	San Miguel	257,621	El Salvador	2024
12	Soyapango	229,747	El Salvador	2024
13	Choloma	220,300	Honduras	2023
14	Cobán	212,047	Guatemala	2023
15	Santa Ana	210,000	El Salvador	2024
16	La Ceiba	209,000	Honduras	2023
17	Quetzaltenango	207,620	Guatemala	2023
18	La Chorrera	205,959	Panama	2024
19	Jalapa	195,321	Guatemala	2023
20	Escuintla	172,324	Guatemala	2023

== Largest urban agglomerations ==
Estimates for all agglomerations with 300,000 or more inhabitants are included. Projections are as of 2022.

City	Population	Country
Guatemala City	3,036,000	Guatemala
Panama City	1,938,000 (Note: Refers to the population of urban localities in the districts of Panamá, Arraiján, La Chorrera and San Miguelito.)	Panama
Tegucigalpa	1,527,000	Honduras
San José	1,441,000	Costa Rica
San Salvador	1,111,000 (Note: Refers to the urban parts of the municipios of San Salvador, Mejicanos, Soyapango, Delgado, Ilopango, Cuscatancingo, Ayutuxtepeque and San Marcos.)	El Salvador
Managua	1,083,000	Nicaragua
San Pedro Sula	956,000	Honduras
Alajuela	398,000	Costa Rica
Heredia	348,000	Costa Rica

== See also ==
- Lists of cities in Central America
