= Final offensive of 1989 =

Salvadorian Civil War engagement

- Part of the Salvadoran Civil War
Date	11 November – 12 December 1989
Location	El Salvador
Result	Government military victory FMLN political victory

Belligerents
(El Salvador) Salvadoran government Supported by: United States	Farabundo Martí National Liberation Front; Supported by: Cuba; Nicaragua

Commanders and leaders
(El Salvador) Alfredo Cristiani (El Salvador) René Emilio Ponce	Schafik Hándal; Salvador Sánchez Cerén; Joaquín Villalobos

Strength
Unknown	2,000–3,000

Casualties and losses
476 killed 1,228 wounded	900 killed 1,109 wounded
- 64+ civilians killed

The final offensive of 1989 (Spanish: ofensiva final de 1989), also known as the ofensiva hasta el tope ("to-the-top offensive"), was the largest engagement of the Salvadoran Civil War. The battle, fought between the Farabundo Martí National Liberation Front (Spanish: Frente Farabundo Martí para la Liberación Nacional, FMLN) Marxist guerrilla and the Salvadoran government, lasted from 11 November to early December 1989. Sometimes referred to as "Ofensiva fuera los fascistas. Febe Elizabeth vive", ("Offensive to drive out the fascists. Febe Elizabeth lives".) in honor of an assassinated union leader, it was the most brutal confrontation in the entire conflict, amounting for seventeen percent of the total casualties in twelve years of warfare.

The extent and consequences of the offensive determined the course the civil war would take in the following two years. The confrontation resulted in casualties for both armies, as well as many civilians. As a consequence, there was an increased pressure to end the war as it had been shown that neither party could achieve total victory and the losses were too large.

== Prelude ==
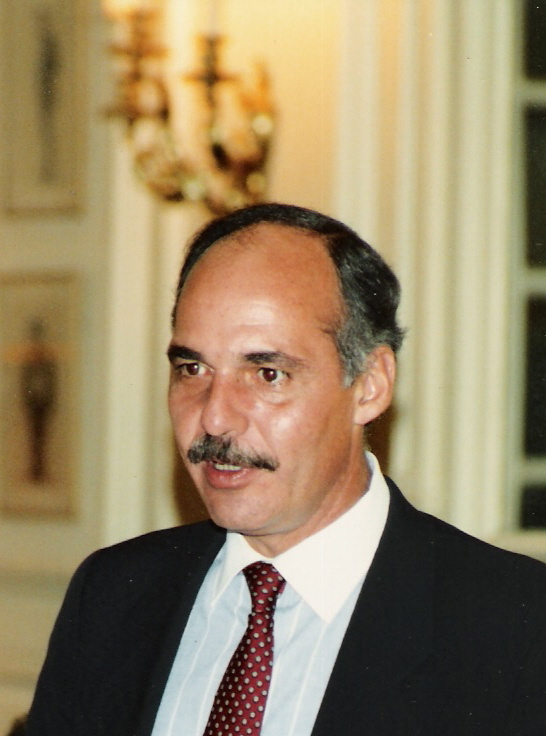
Alfredo Cristiani

The year 1989 was of key importance for the armed conflict in El Salvador. In February of that year, a far-right paramilitary organisation known as the "Maximiliano Hernández Martínez Anti-Communist Brigade" placed a bomb near the building of the Salvadoran Workers Union (Spanish: Unión de Trabajadores Salvadoreños). One week later, another attack was orchestrated by right-wing armed groups, this time against the National Workers' Union Federation (Spanish: Federación Nacional Sindical de Trabajadores Salvadoreños, FENASTRAS), causing the death of ten workers. In the same year, a series of demands from guerrilla towards the government were ignored shortly after the right-wing party ARENA's Alfredo Cristiani had been elected president of the country.

In the midst of violent attacks coming from both involved parties with regional implications, presidents from Central American countries met in Tela, Honduras to discuss the armed conflict. As a result of this summit, the FMLN was urged to call a ceasefire as stated by the document of Esquipulas II. Meanwhile, in El Salvador, commissions for a peace dialogue were trying to find a peaceful solution to the conflict. A dialogue was held in Mexico on 13 September 1989, resulting in the "Mexico Agreement", the first formal proposal to negotiate the end of the war. A month later, a new gathering was held in Costa Rica to continue the negotiations.

Despite these attempts for peace, the attacks and violence continued to escalate on both sides. In October 1989 bombs were placed near the house of socialist leader Rubén Zamora and the General Staff of the Salvadoran Army.

On 31 October another attack was launched against FENASTRAS, resulting in ten dead and twenty wounded unionised workers, including Febe Elizabeth Velázquez, an important figure in the national labour movement. This event led to the FMLN's withdrawal from the peace negotiations and served as ideological fuel for the Ofensiva, which was already being planned.

The international scene also affected sentiment on both sides of the Salvadoran Civil War, especially the FMLN. The Sandinistas were at risk of losing power in Nicaragua, which would mean losing an important ideological ally and making the smuggling of weapons from the Gulf of Fonseca even harder.

The events of the Cold War were also echoing in El Salvador. With the slow decline of communism in the Eastern Bloc leading the destruction of the Berlin Wall just two days prior to the start of the offensive, the FMLN's command became demoralised and divided*; some members saw the collapse of their ideology as a reason to find a peaceful and fast solution to the conflict while others became increasingly demotivated at the imminent failure of international communism.

Since mid-1989, FMLN commanders Francisco Jovel, Salvador Sánchez Cerén, Eduardo Sancho, Schafik Hándal and Joaquín Villalobos had been meeting in Managua, strategic bastion of the guerrilla's high command, in order to plan what would later become the Ofensiva hasta el tope.

Finally, on 9 November 1989, shortly after the FENASTRAS attacks, Villalobos announced an increase in warfare activities and a definite retreat from the dialogues to be held in Caracas at the end of the month. By this time, the Salvadoran Army was already aware of an intended assault on the capital and other cities, but greatly underestimated the magnitude of the attack.

== The offensive ==
The FMLN launched simultaneous assaults on important military posts in the major cities of San Miguel, Usulután and Zacatecoluca on 11 November 1989. However, for military, strategic and political reasons, the primary focus of the Ofensiva was the capital city of San Salvador.

The city, located in the heart of El Salvador, was easily accessible for the insurgents due to its proximity to the San Salvador Volcano and major guerrilla strongholds of San Jacinto and Guazapa. At 7:00PM some 2,000-3,000 fighters from the guerrilla forces that made up the FMLN – the ERP, FPL, PCES, RN and PRTC – descended from the hills that for years had been their territories and into the cities for the first time since the beginning of the war. The guerrillas infiltrated the heavily populated urban centres of northern San Salvador, breaking into civilian houses for protection against the army. The walls that divided the large and crowded apartment complexes were perforated by the guerrillas to make indoor tunnels and provide safe mobilisation.

The war was also raging in to other major departments, such as San Miguel and Santa Ana. The intended targets were various military facilities in the country. The FMLN planned to steal stored weapons and arm the civil population against the government.

The first target was the army command in Ayutuxtepeque, followed by a series of assaults on military locations in Mejicanos, Ciudad Delgado, Soyapango, Cerro San Jacinto, Zacatecoluca, San Miguel and Usulután. Insurgents also targeted installations of the National Guard, one of the main security forces of the country. According to retired army official Juan Orlando Zepeda, on the first night of the offensive rebels also attacked the residences of president Cristiani, vice-president Merino and Legislative Assembly President Roberto Angulo and several other government officials.

The FMLN rapidly penetrated into the densely populated urban centers in northern San Salvador: Soyapango, Apopa, Ayutuxtepeque, Cuscatancingo, Ciudad Delgado, Mejicanos and Zacamil. The fighting then spread as insurgent troops were mobilizing in Antiguo Cuscatlán, Huizúcar and Santa Tecla, also populous and economically important metropolitan areas to the west of San Salvador.

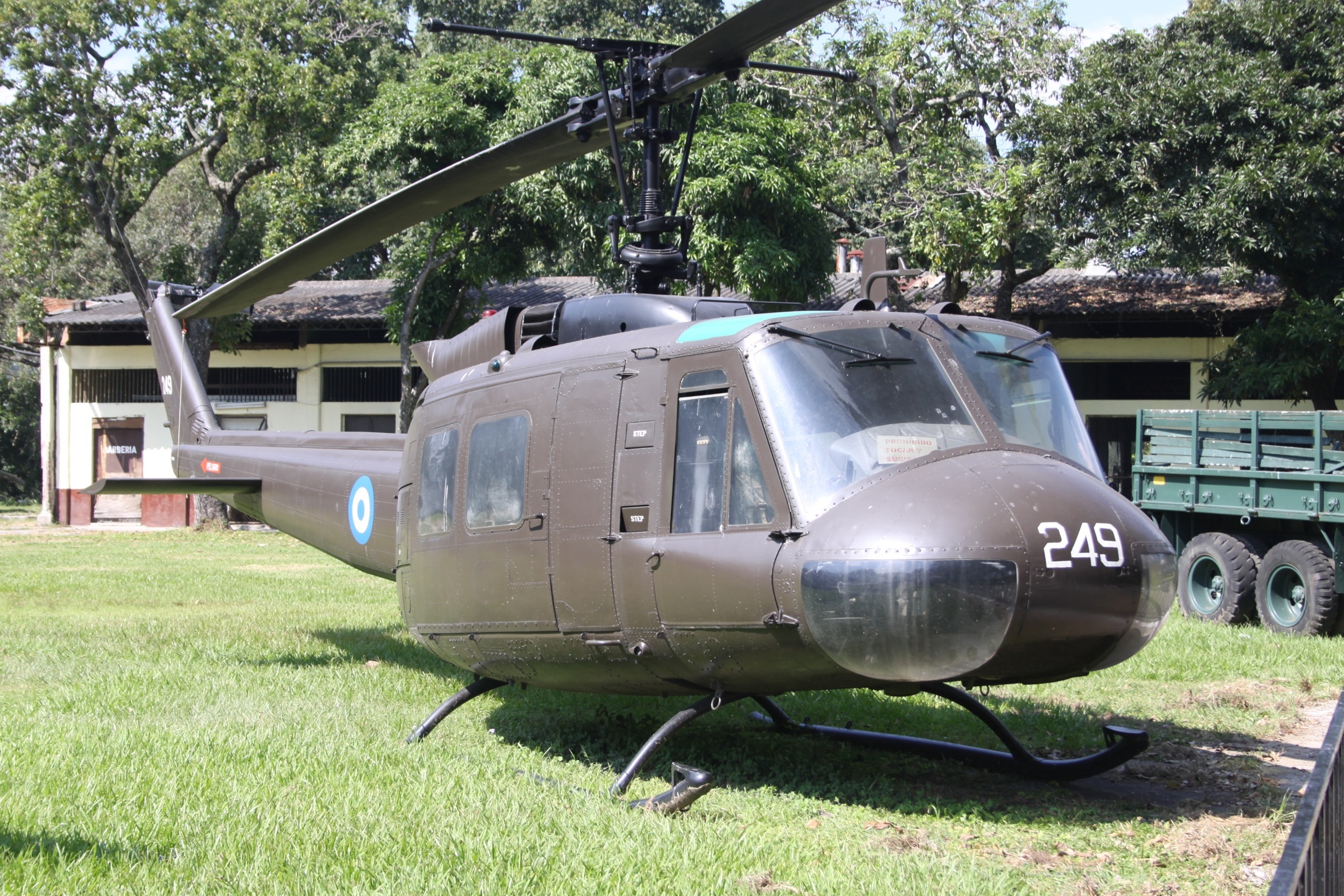
A former Bell UH-1H of the Salvadoran Air Force

The guerrilla forces took shelter among the civilians in populous colonias such as Ciudad Delgado and Soyapango. The original plan was to arm and recruit these civilians and join them in the revolution. However, most of them chose not to and instead fled the neighborhoods occupied by the rebels. The rebels occupied cemeteries and depended on stored weapons on grave sites. The Salvadoran special forces and (FAS) Fuerza Aérea Salvadoreña had at the time the most experienced combat helicopter force in Central America. All the special forces were trained using Vietnam War tactics developed by the US military. FAS had multiple 80 UH-1Hs and 24 UH-1Ms, were heavily equipped and modified by the Fuerza Aérea Salvadoreña (FAS), US Army, and Bell Helicopter Company to carry rockets.

Once most civilians had been evacuated, the Air Force (FAS) bombed the area. This gradual evacuation and the subsequent bombing resulted in heavy casualties for the FMLN.

The next day, the government issued a national curfew and media warfare started, as both parties knew the importance of having public opinion on their side. On the one hand, the government was censoring all major media. Newspapers were not allowed to discuss military casualties and were urged to show or exaggerate insurgent casualties, so that the population would get the idea of a clear military victory. On the other hand, the guerillas initiated a heavy propaganda strategy through their clandestine Radio Venceremos.

Forty-eight hours later, the capital had become a battlefield for a large scale insurgent combat. In the climax of the Ofensiva, the rebel forces had penetrated most urban areas of the country for the first time since the beginning of the conflict.

As the combat progressed in the main urban centers of the country, a military unit of the infamous Batallón Atlacatl broke into José Simeón Cañas Central American University (Spanish: Universidad Centroamericana José Simeón Cañas, UCA) and executed six Jesuit priests and two domestic employees on 16 November 1989. The UCA martyrs, as they became known, were considered by the Salvadoran right as the "brain of the guerilla" due to their affinity to Liberation Theology and their calls for peace and social justice.

Despite the situation, OAS secretary general João Clemente Baena Soares arrived in the country on 19 November to promote peace negotiations. As FMLN guerillas advanced through San Salvador they eventually reached Hotel Sheraton, where Berna Soares was staying. The rebels took over the hotel's VIP tower for several hours holding Baena Soares hostage, along with several foreigners and five U.S. Marines. Eventually, after an agreement unknown to the public, the hostages were released to the Salvadoran security forces.

As a consequence of the Ofensiva, the Salvadoran government broke diplomatic relations with the Nicaraguan government on 27 November, claiming involvement in support of the rebels.

Two days later, the insurgents assassinated Supreme Court president Francisco José Guerrero and ventured into the affluent neighborhoods Maquilishuat, Campestre, Lomas Verdes and Escalón. The objective was to pressure and destabilise the Army, which would be more hesitant to fight them in these neighborhoods, with important sites such as the presidential residency. Finally, by the beginning of December, the offensive was finally ceased.

== Aftermath ==
The offensive is considered to have sped up the peace negotiations between the government and the FMLN, eventually leading to the peace treaties of Chapultepec that put an end to the 12 year conflict. The government realised the FMLN's numbers were actually much higher than they had initially estimated and they were getting more and better weaponry through Nicaragua. They knew that, with their current resources, they could never entirely wipe out the guerrillas in the mountains and the rural zones they controlled. On the other hand, it was clear that the FMLN would never be able to defeat the army in open combat, and that civilians were not willing to join their ranks in an all-out assault. In essence, it was a realisation for both parties that they could not achieve a military victory over the other, and any attempt would only result in more casualties and economic loss.

Arguably the most important event of the offensive was the murder of six Jesuit priests, and two others on the José Simeón Cañas Central American University campus on November 16, 1989. This event was universally recognised as a war crime and the international community, especially Spain, shifted its attention to El Salvador, because five of the six victims were Spanish citizens. The crime created an outrage that still echoes today. Many countries and organisations condemned this issue, and even the United States government began to urge the Salvadoran government for a peaceful end to the conflict. According to José María Tojeira, former rector of the UCA, it was this attack, and not the Ofensiva, which sped up the end of the war.

On 6 December Colonel René Emilio Ponce, Army Chief of Staff, issued a statement estimating the FMLN casualties as 1,902 insurgents killed and 1,109 insurgents wounded and 446 soldiers killed and 1,228 soldiers wounded. The Ministry of Planning offered estimates of 4,499 victims between 11 November and 12 December with 1,526 FMLN fighters, 428 military and 64 civilians.

The economic damage caused was 597 million colones, with the country's industry and commerce sectors being the most affected. A total of 3,048 homes had been either destroyed or damaged in the areas of Mejicanos, Ciudad Delgado, Cuscatancingo, Apopa, Soyapango and San Salvador.
