= Ayutuxtepeque =

- District
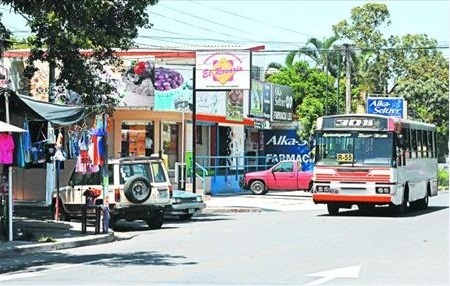
- Street in Ayutuxtepeque

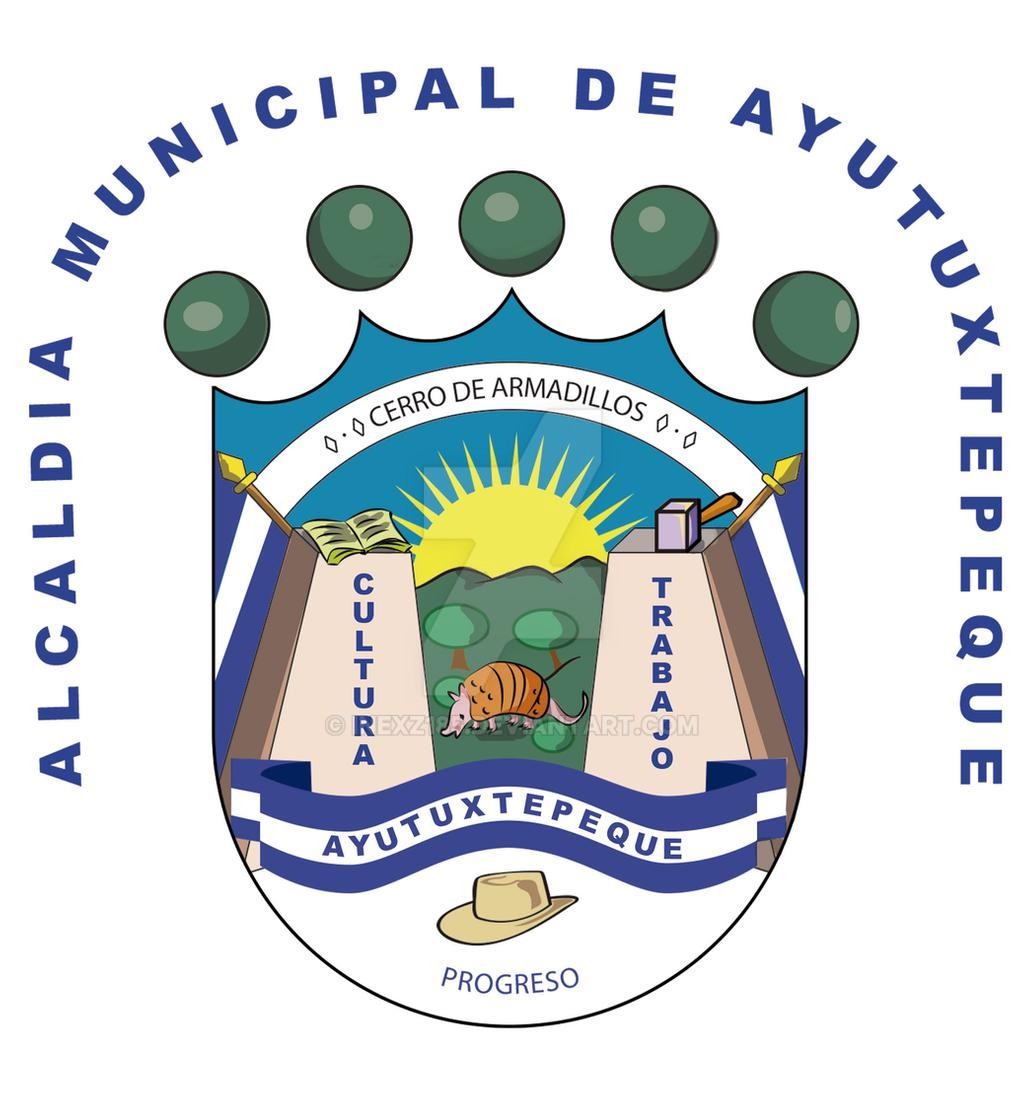
- Seal

- Location within El Salvador
- Coordinates: 13°44′8.46″N 89°12′2.81″W
- Country: El Salvador
- Department: San Salvador
- Metro: San Salvador Metropolitan Area
- Town: 1824
- Villa: 1971
- City: 1996

Government
  - Mayor: Rafael Alejandro Nóchez Solano (ARENA)

Area
  - District: 8.41 km^{2} (3.25 sq mi)
- Elevation: 700 m (2,300 ft)

Population (2020)
  - District: 51,558
  - Urban: 51,558
- Time zone: UTC−6 (Central Standard Time)
- SV-SS: CP 1121
- Area code: +503
- Website: Official Site (in Spanish)

Ayutuxtepeque is a district in the San Salvador department of El Salvador. It is one of the nine municipalities that make up the San Salvador Metropolitan Area (AMSS). The name of the municipality means "Armadillos Hill (or Mountain)"

== Municipal government ==
The current mayor for the period of 2009 to 2014 is Rafael Alejandro Nochez Solano a member of the Nationalist Republican Alliance party.

== Administrative divisions ==
Ayutuxtepeque has the following 2 cantons:

- El Zapote
- Los Llanitos

== Demographics ==
It has a population of 34,710 (2007) with 49.2% men and 50.8% women. The entire population lives in urban areas.

== Geography ==
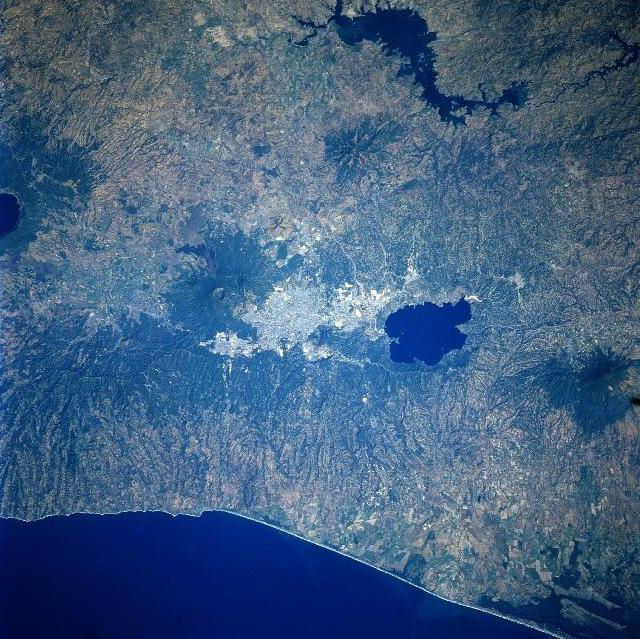
San Salvador Area From Space

Ayutuxtepeque is limited by the following municipalities: to the north, Apopa, on the east by Cuscatancingo and Delgado, to the south by Mejicanos and on the west by Apopa. It has an area of 8.41 Km2 and it is located between the following geographic coordinates 13° 46'23 "LN (northern end) and 13° 43'55" LN (southern end), 89° 11'08 "LWG (eastern end) and 89° 13'55" LWG (western end). With an altitud of 700 MAMSL.

=== Hydrography ===
Creeks: Santa Maria, Arenal Ravines: De Morán, El Zapote, Barranca Honda, Chancala and Chicaguaste

== Economy ==
The main industry of the town, is the manufacturing of bricks and roof tiles, there is a garment factory, a chemical-pharmaceutical factory, a processor of sausages and small industries in abundance. In the local trade, there are grocery stores, shops, pharmacies and other small businesses, mostly SMEs. The trade is primarily done with the municipalities of Mejicanos, Apopa, Nejapa, San Salvador and others.

== Culture ==
The patron saint of the municipality is Saint Sebastian and festivals are held annually from January 27 to 30.
