= Tonacatepeque =

Tonacatepeque Tonaca
- District
- Location in El Salvador
- Coordinates: 13°47′N 89°07′W
- Country: El Salvador
- Department: San Salvador Department
- Elevation: 1,978 ft (603 m)

Population (2020)
  - District: 170,282
  - Urban: 146,443
- Website: www.mytonaca.com

Tonacatepeque is a district in the San Salvador department of El Salvador. It has a population of 90,896 inhabitants according to the 2007 Census. This makes this municipality twelfth largest in terms of population in El Salvador. It is part of the San Salvador metropolitan area.

== History ==
According to archeological findings, Tonacatepeque was first founded as a small settlement by the Pipil people in mountains just south of its current location. Under the Pipil people, Tonacatepeque was likely a small, minor chiefdom threatened by possible incursions by the Señorío de Cuscatlán (Lordship of Cuscatlán). During the conquest and settlement of the newly discovered Americas, an order of Franciscan missionaries attempted to convert the indigenous people, establishing a new church. The patron saint of Tonacatepeque under the Franciscan order was San Nicolás Obispo de Mira (Saint Nicholas Bishop of Myra). Hence, the burgeoning settlement took on the name San Nicolás Tonacatepeque. According to local history, around 1880 the foundations and ruins of that first Franciscan church were still visible.

The current location of Tonacatepeque was established in 1560. By 1770, the town had its own established church and included annexed areas such as Soyapango, Ilopango, and the San José Guayabal Valley. At this point, the town was home to 96 families, comprising 628 people. In 1786, Tonacatepeque was integrated within the jurisdiction of San Salvador. In 1807, following a census done by Intendent Don Antonio Gutiérrez Ulloa, Tonacatepque was classified as a "pueblo" or small village, inhabited by 17 Spaniards, 718 natives, and 619 mestizos. Almost seven decades later, on March 7, 1874, the Salvadoran Legislature (under the administration of Field Marshal Santiago González) authorized the reclassification of Tonacatepeque from "pueblo" to "Villa." The title of City was conferred by legislative decree on February 6, 1878, during the administration of Dr. Rafael Zaldívar. On March 17, 1892, Tonacatepeque was made District Center by legislative decree under the administration of General Carlos Ezeta. The new administrative district included the populations of Toncatepeque, Apopa, Ilopango, San Martín, Nejapa, Guazapa, Aguilares, and El Paisnal.

== Geography ==
The city of Tonacatepeque is situated on a plateau about 600 meters above sea level. It lies 18 kilometers to the northeast of El Salvador's capital, San Salvador.

Generally, the region's climate is cooler and less humid than its surrounding neighbors due to its mountainous location. However, during the months of March and April there can be influxes of heat and humidity. The region's minimum temperature is 22 °C (71.6 °F) with a maximum temperature of 28 °C (82.4 °F).
