= Lists of cities in Central America =

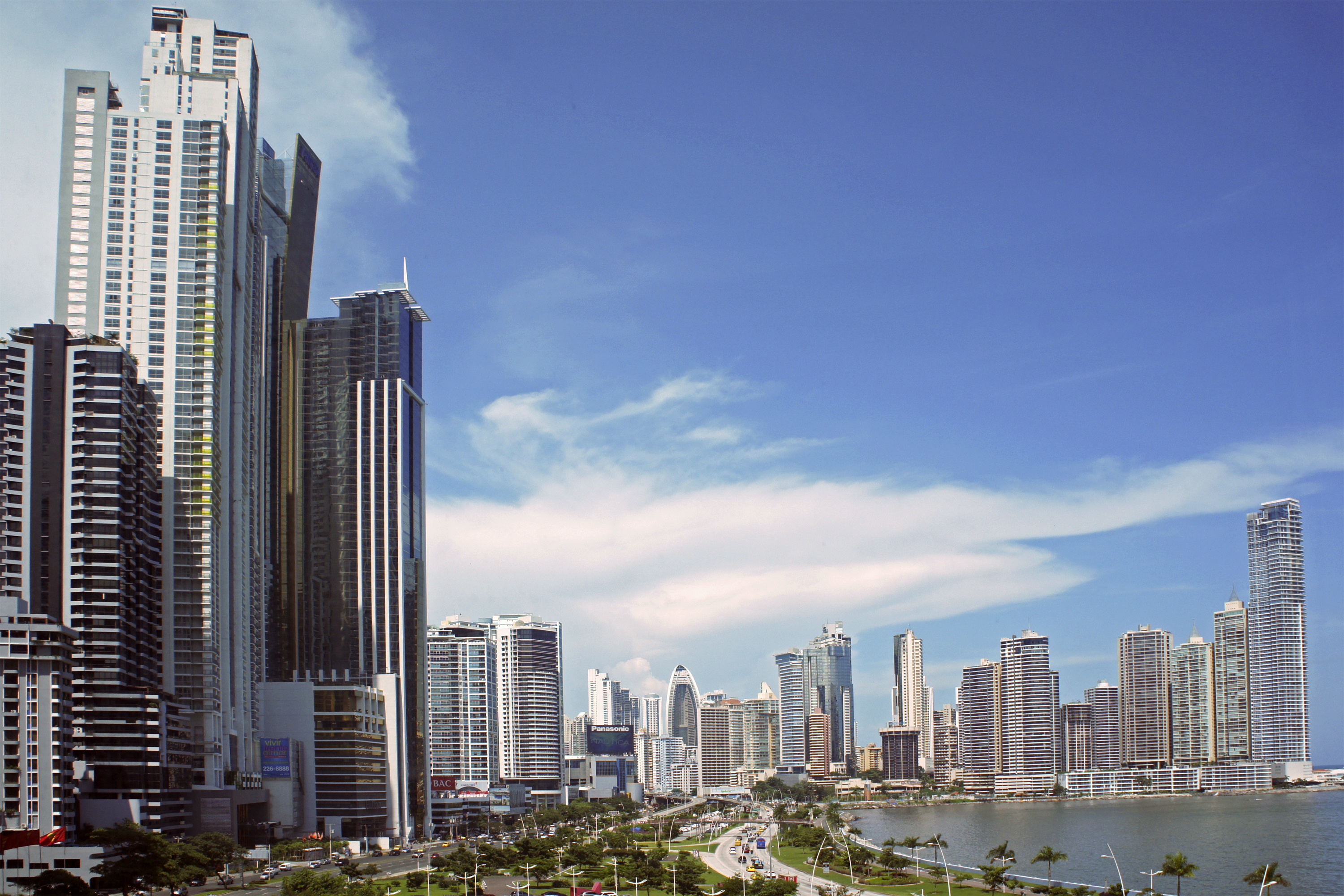
Panama City, capital of Panama

This is a list of lists of cities in Central America.

== Lists of cities in Central America ==
- List of largest cities in Central America

=== By country ===
- Cantons of Costa Rica
- List of cities in El Salvador
- List of cities in Panama
- List of municipalities in Belize
- List of places in Guatemala
- Municipalities of Honduras
- Municipalities of Nicaragua
- List of Nicaraguan cities by population

== See also ==
- List of cities in Mexico
- Lists of cities
