= ADOC =

ADOC may refer to:

- Air Defense Operations Center (NORAD), a military facility command and control center
  - Air Defense Center Kindsbach (ADOC Kindsbach), near Ramstein Air Base, Germany
- Alabama Department of Corrections, US
- Empresas ADOC, a Salvadoran shoe manufacturing company
- .adoc, a file extension for AsciiDoc markup language files
