= Final offensive =

Final offensive may refer to:

- Final offensive of the Spanish Civil War (26 March – 1 April 1939)
- Final offensive of 1981 (El Salvador), during the Salvadoran civil war (10 – 26 January 1981)
- Final offensive of 1989, during the Salvadoran civil war (11 November – 12 December 1989)
