= Metropolitan Area of San Salvador =

Area in El Salvador

Metropolitan Area of San Salvador Área Metropolitana de San Salvador (AMSS)
- Metropolitan Area
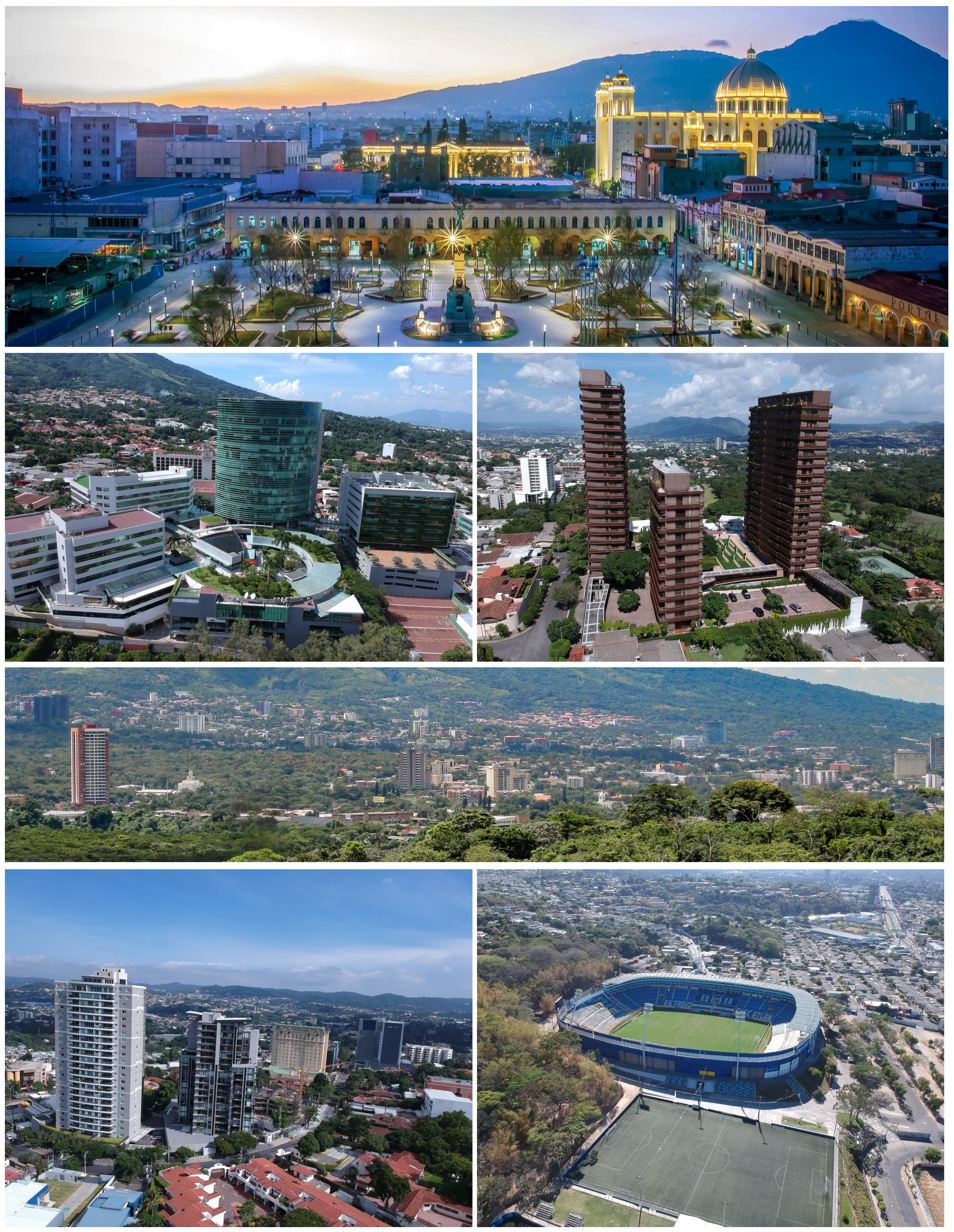
- Top, left to right: National Palace of El Salvador, Zona Rosa (San Salvador), Temple of El Salvador, Metropolitan Cathedral of San Salvador, Skyline of San Salvador, Zona Rosa and Cuscatlán Stadium
Interactive Map of Metropolitan Area of San Salvador (AMSS)
City of / Ciudad de San Salvador
Metropolitan Area of San Salvador /
Área Metropolitana de San Salvador
Department of San Salvador /
Departamento de San Salvador
- Country: El Salvador
- Department(s): San Salvador; La Libertad

Area
  - Total: 1,167 km^{2} (451 sq mi)

Population (2023)
  - Total: 1,696,692
- Time zone: UTC-6

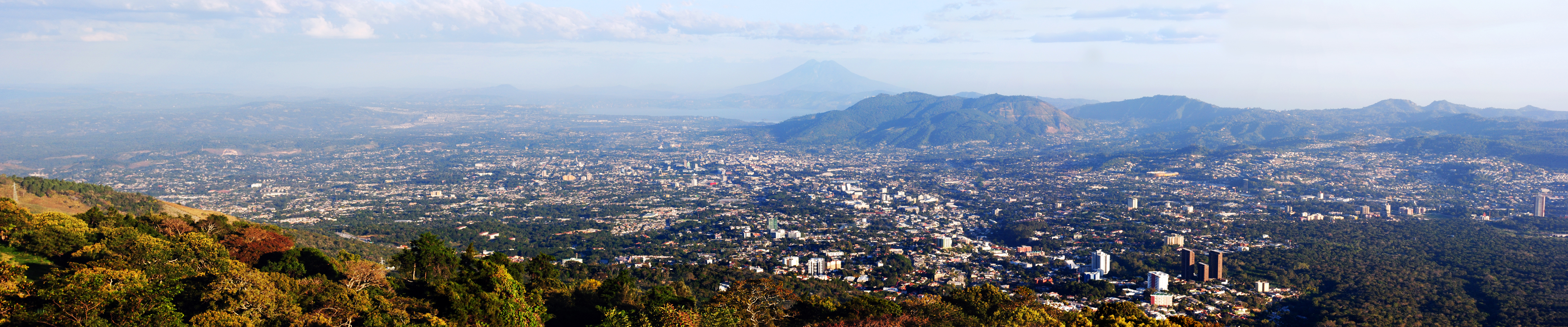
The Metropolitan Area of San Salvador, from San Salvador (volcano)

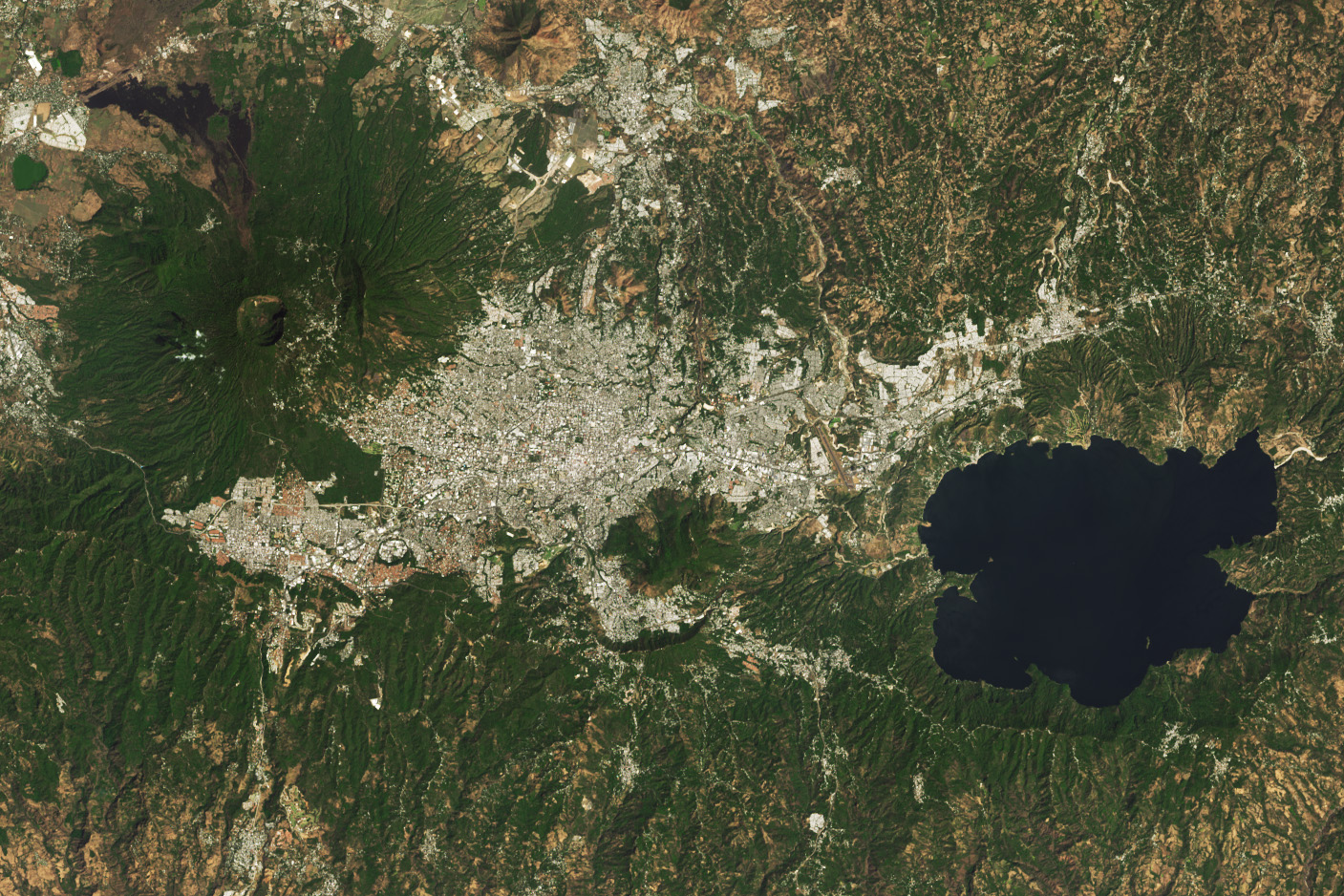
Satellite image of Metropolitan Area of San Salvador

The Metropolitan Area of San Salvador (Área Metropolitana de San Salvador or AMSS) is a metropolitan area formed by San Salvador, the capital of El Salvador, and with a total of seven municipalities which are subdivided into 23 districts. It was instituted in 1993 through Legislative Decree No. 732 of the Law on Territorial Development and the Metropolitan Area of San Salvador and neighbouring municipalities. The Act defines that, based on their urban development, these cities form a single urban unit.

Since 1990, it was felt that urban development in the Municipality of San Salvador and neighbouring municipalities was having a remarkable growth, and even be defined as a big city. This situation required the planning and control of urban development in these municipalities and their conformation as a metropolitan area.

Currently, the AMSS constitutes the directional centre of the country in political, financial, economic and cultural life. The most recently published official population projections for El Salvador forecasted the combined population of the fourteen municipalities at 1,767,102 in 2015, which would constitute 27.4% of the country's projected 6,460,271 inhabitants.

== Districts ==
- San Salvador - Capital of El Salvador.
- Antiguo Cuscatlan - 4 kilometres southwest of San Salvador.
- Santa Tecla - 9 kilometres southwest of San Salvador.
- San Marcos - 6 kilometres south of San Salvador.
- Soyapango - 6 kilometres east of San Salvador.
- Ilopango - 8 kilometres east.
- San Martin - 15 kilometres east.
- Tonacatepeque - 12 kilometres northeast.
- Ciudad Delgado - 4 kilometres northeast.
- Cuscatancingo - 4 kilometres north.
- Mejicanos- 5 kilometres north.
- Apopa - 11 kilometres north.
- Nejapa-13 kilometres north.
- Ayutuxtepeque - 7 kilometres north.
