= List of Salvadoran departments by Human Development Index =

This is a list the fourteen departments of El Salvador by Human Development Index.

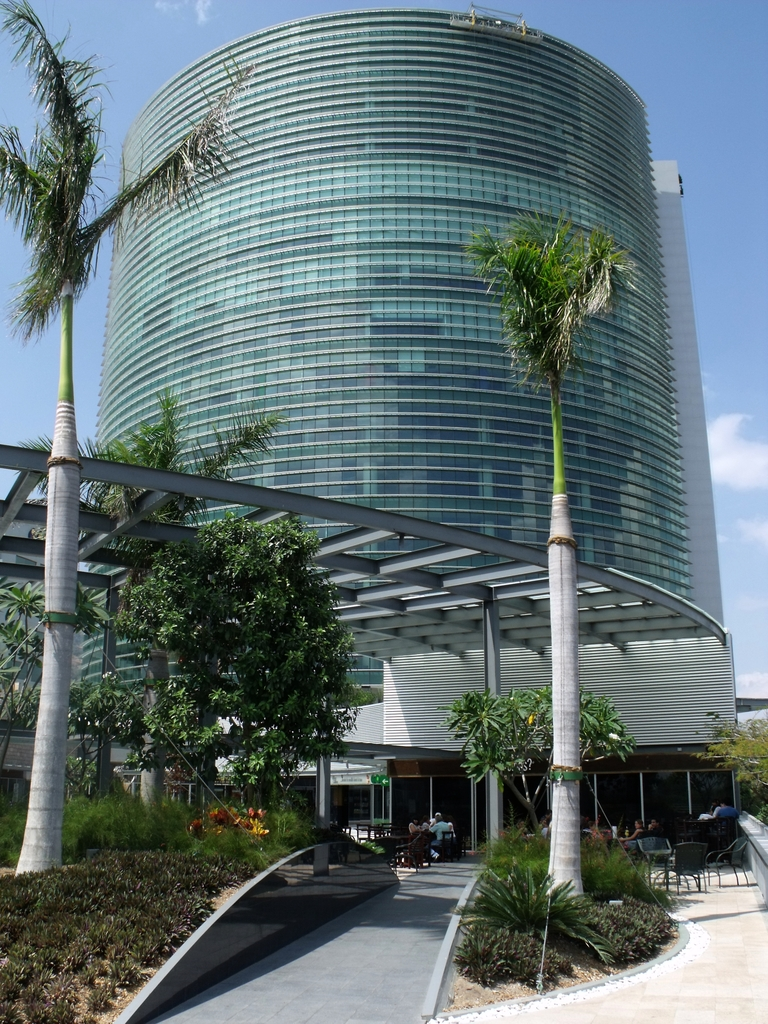
World Trade Center in (1st) San Salvador

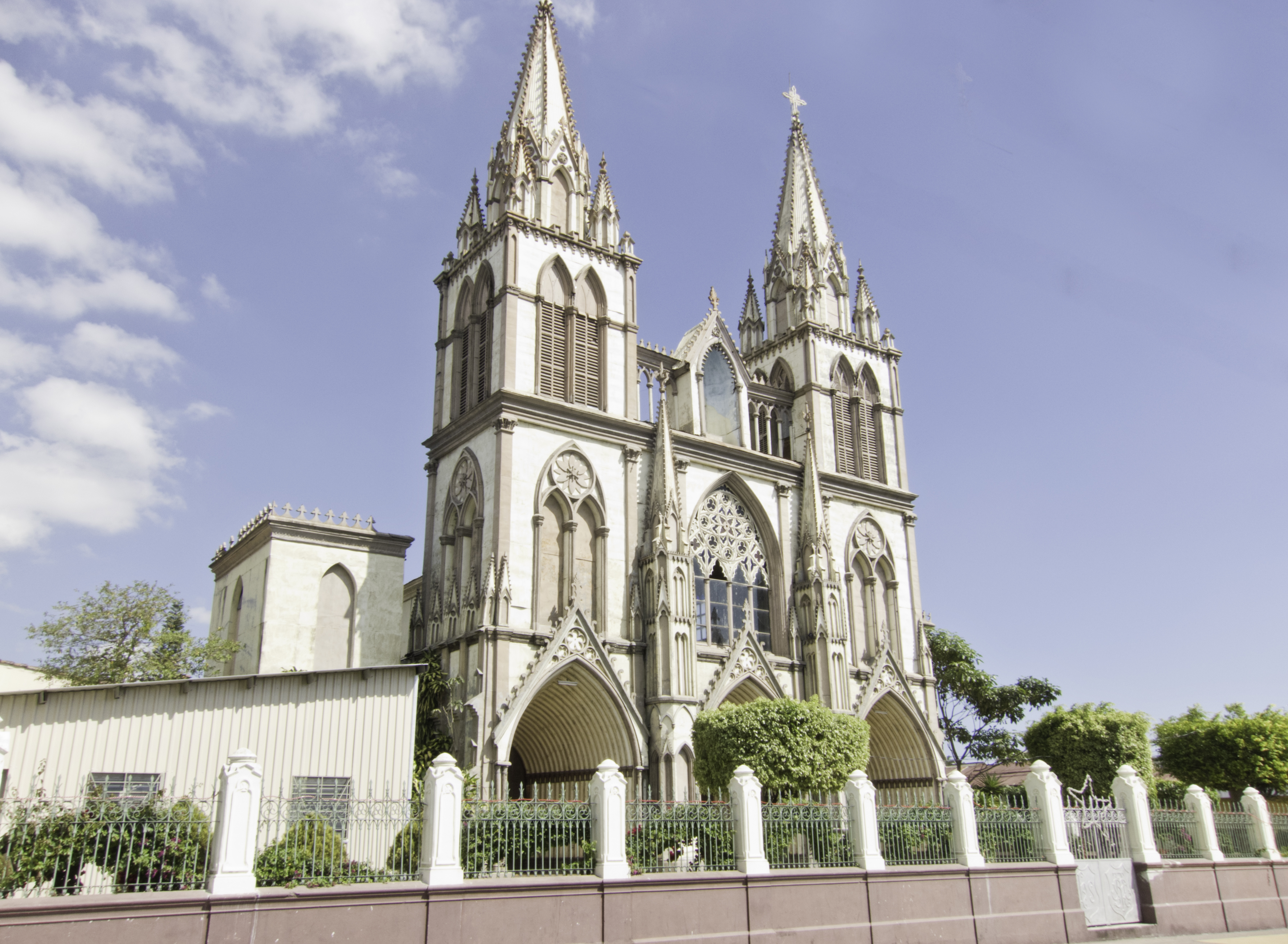
Santa Tecla Cathedral in (2nd) La Libertad

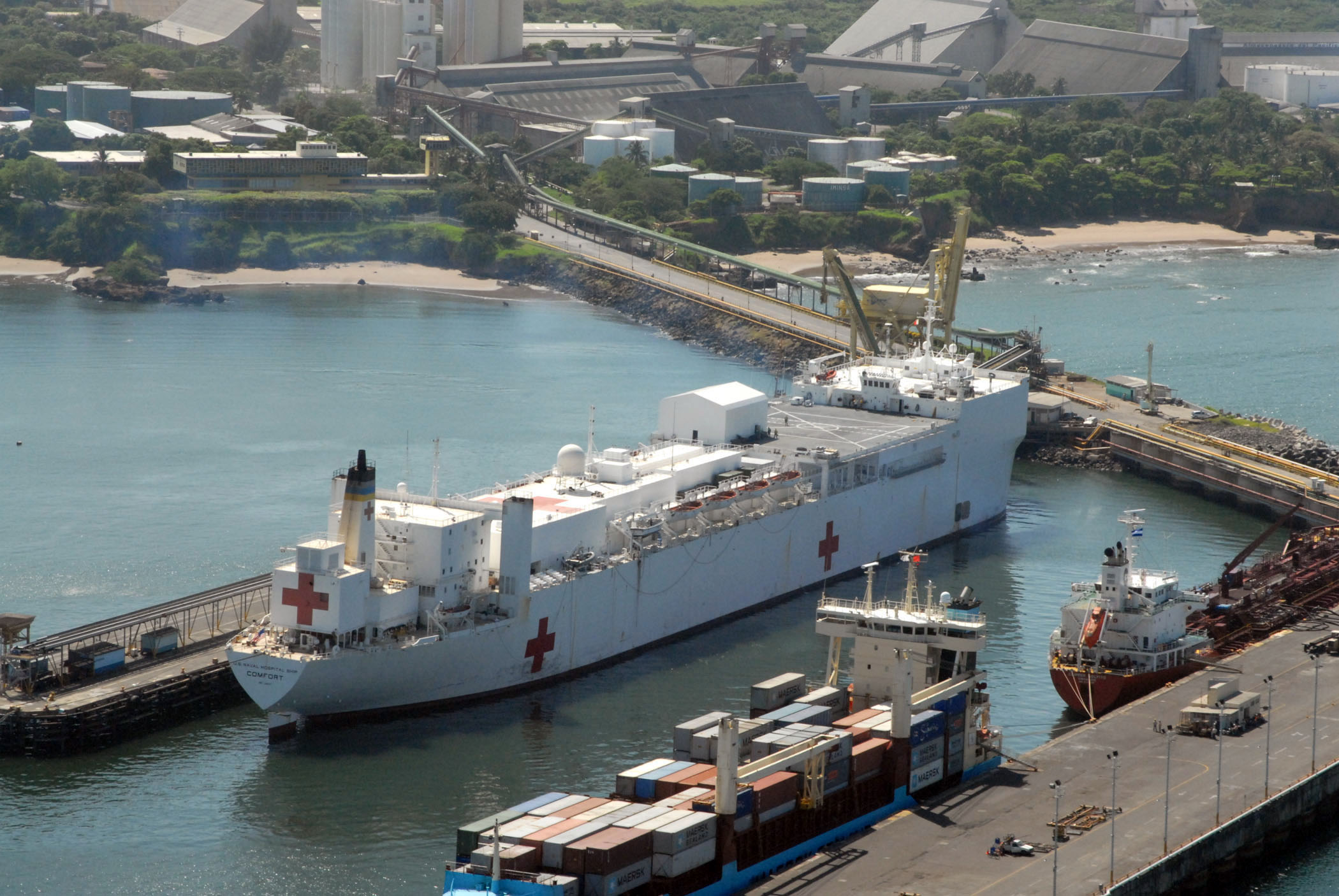
Acajutla port in (4th) Sonsonate

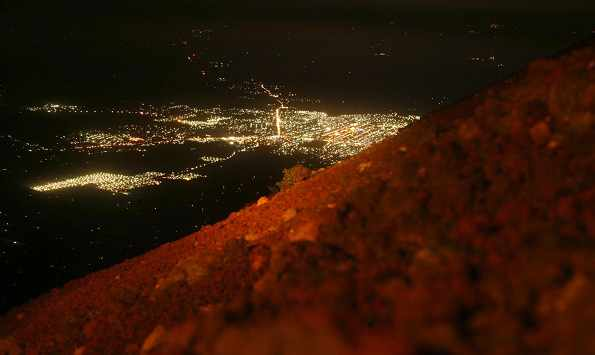
View of the capital city of (6th) San Miguel

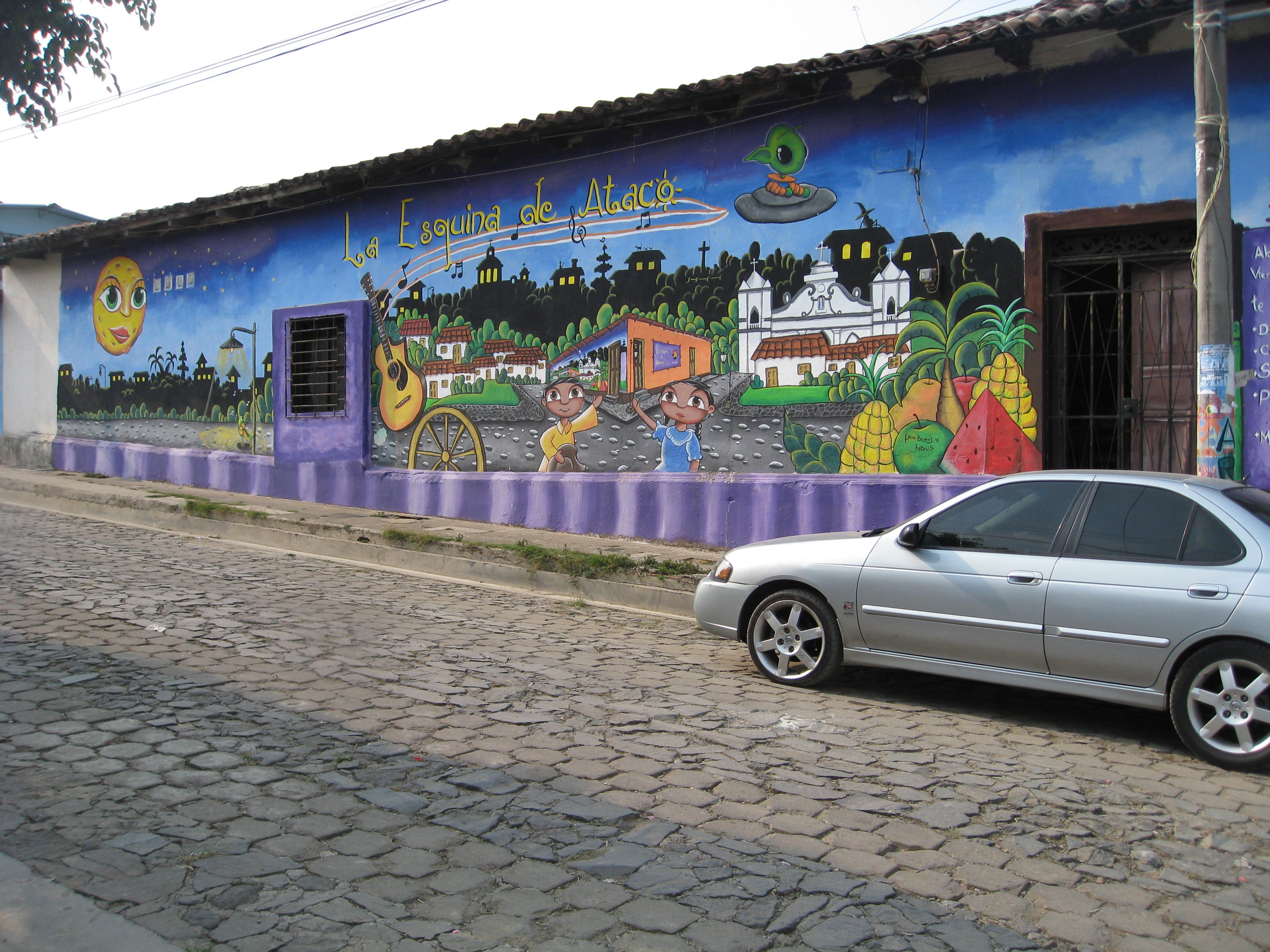
Ataco Village in (9th) Ahuachapán

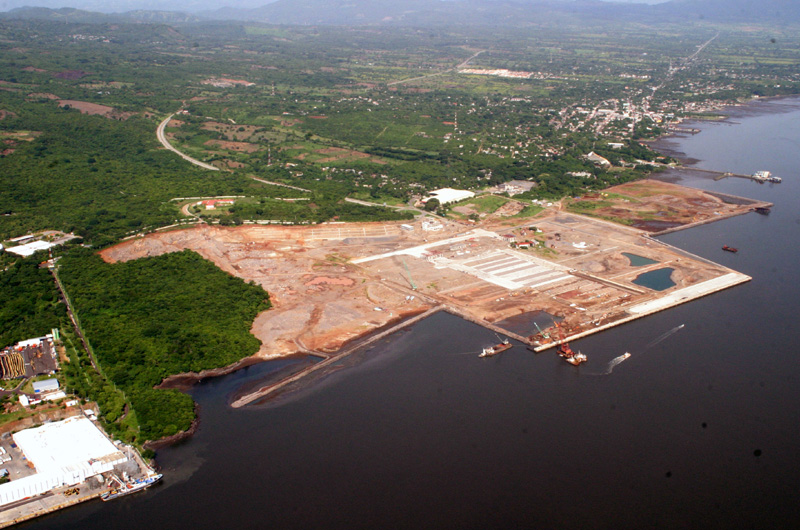
Construction of La Union Port, built to develop the department of (12th) La Union

== Departments ==
Department	Capital	HDI	Estimated population 2010
High Human Development
San Salvador Department	San Salvador	0.716	2,995,787
Medium Human Development
La Libertad Department	Santa Tecla, El Salvador	0.664	842,624
San Miguel Department	San Miguel, El Salvador	0.646	454,003
Usulután Department	Usulután	0.644	464,883
La Paz Department	Zacatecoluca	0.642	318,107
Cuscatlán	Cojutepeque	0.640	231,480
Sonsonate Department	Sonsonate	0.639	518,522
Santa Ana Department	Santa Ana, El Salvador	0.633	630,903
San Vicente Department	San Vicente, El Salvador	0.632	230,205
Ahuachapán Department	Ahuachapán	0.614	377,141
Cabañas	Sensuntepeque	0.611	214,150
Chalatenango Department	Chalatenango	0.609	274,878
Morazán	San Francisco Gotera	0.606	251,447
La Unión Department	La Unión, El Salvador	0.593	372,271
