= San Martín, El Salvador =

San Martín
- District
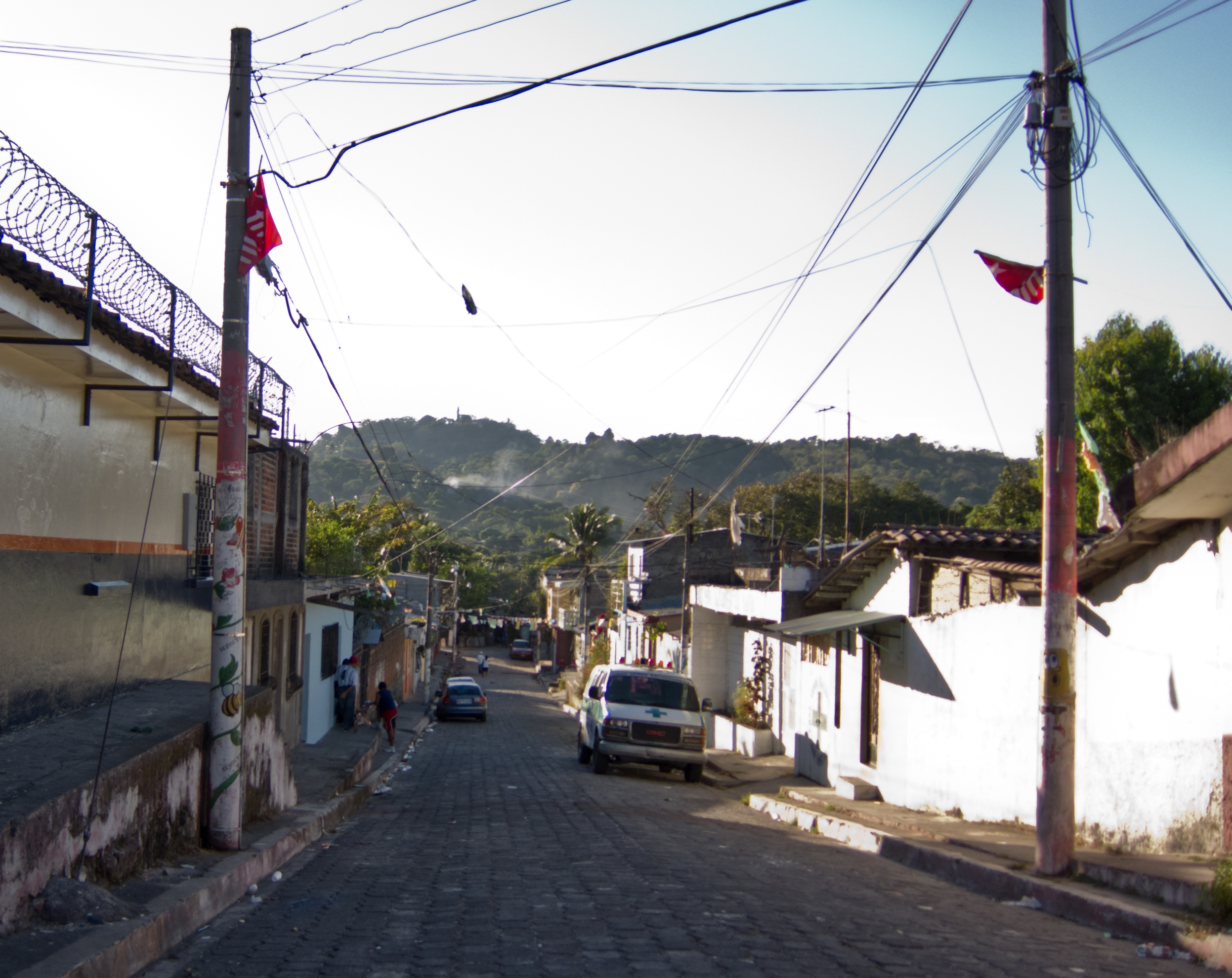
- A street in San Martin

- Location in El Salvador
- Coordinates: 13°44′N 89°3′W
- Country: El Salvador
- Department: San Salvador Department

Area
  - District: 21.5 sq mi (55.8 km^{2})
- Elevation: 2,343 ft (714 m)

Population (2020)
  - District: 112,065
  - Urban: 101,643

San Martín is a district in the San Salvador department of El Salvador. According to the 2007 Population and Housing Census, it has 72,758 inhabitants. The municipality is limited by San José Guayabal and Oratorio de Concepción to the North; San Bartolomé Perulapía and San Pedro Perulapán to the East; by Ilopango and the Lake of Ilopango to the South; and to the West by Tonacatepeque. For its administration it is divided into 8 cantons and 37 hamlets. Its main river is the Chunchucuyo; in terms of its orographyits main elevations are Las Delicias, Chuchutepeque, La Tigra and Teguantepeque hills. Its climate is warm and belongs to the type of hot earth and its annual rainfall amount varies between 1,750 and 1970 mm. The vegetation is constituted by humid subtropical forest. The locality covers an area of 55.8 km^{2} and the headland has an elevation of 725.0 meters above sea level. The municipality is part of the San Salvador metropolitan area.

The agricultural production is mainly cultivated with basic grains, sugarcane, coffee, vegetables and fruit trees. There are industries such as the manufacture of soft drinks containers, maquilas, truck bodies and artisanal fishing; there are also other businesses including stores, beauty parlors, supermarkets, motels, restaurants, etc. The festivities are held from November 1 to 11 in honor of San Martín Obispo.
