= Empresas ADOC =

- Industry: Fashion
- Founded: 1953; 73 years ago
- Founder: Roberto Palomo
- Headquarters: Soyapango, El Salvador
- Area served: Guatemala, El Salvador, Honduras, Nicaragua, Costa Rica, Panama, Caribbean.
- Key people: Arturo Sagrera Palomo, President; Javier Castillo, Chief Executive Officer.
- Products: Shoes
- Website: empresasadoc.com

Empresas ADOC is a Salvadoran shoe manufacturing company; in 1990, it was the largest manufacturer of shoes in Central America.

== Overview ==
Its headquarters are located in Soyapango.

Mr. Roberto Palomo founded the firm in 1953. As of 1990, ADOC was the largest employer in El Salvador with over 3,000 employees. ADOC has retail operations, leather and rubber production and processing operations, and the only abattoir in El Salvador to be United States Department of Agriculture approved (not operational any more).

As of 2005, its only U.S. location is in Gulfton, Houston, Texas.

The company operates six different retail formats across Central America and Panama.
