= Nejapa =

- District
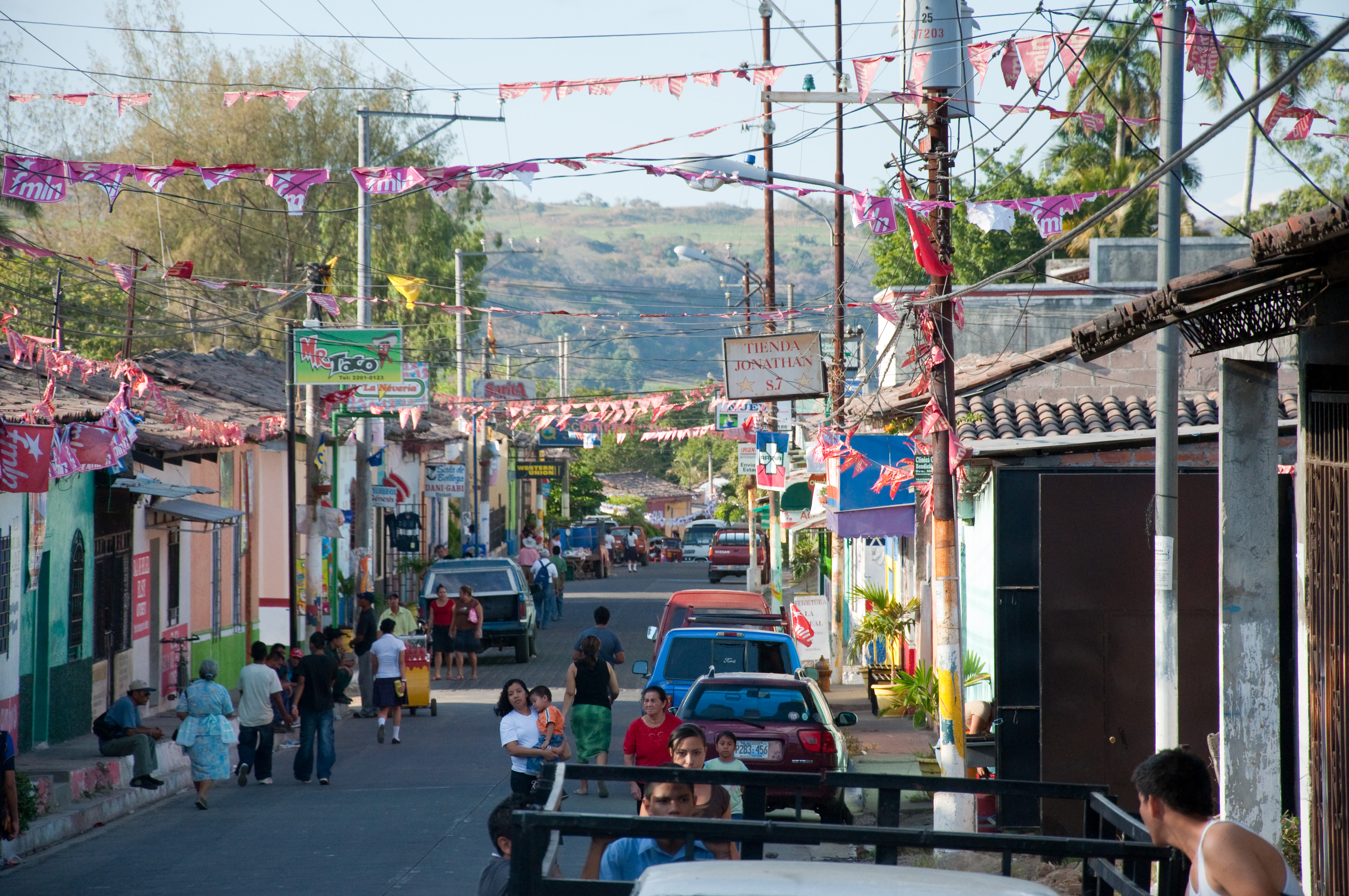

- Location in El Salvador
- Coordinates: 13°49′N 89°14′W
- Country: El Salvador
- Department: San Salvador Department
- Metro: San Salvador Metropolitan Area
- Incorporated as Town: 1878
- Incorporated as City: 1959

Area
  - District: 32.2 sq mi (83.4 km^{2})
- Elevation: 1,496 ft (456 m)

Population (2020)
  - District: 33,766
  - Urban: 18,943
- Time zone: UTC−6 (Central Standard Time)
- SV-SS: CP 1126
- Area code: +503
- Website: alcaldianejapa.gob.sv/

Nejapa is a district in the San Salvador department of El Salvador. It is part of the San Salvador metropolitan area.

== Traditions ==
=== Las Bolas De Fuego ===
One of the major traditions of Nejapa is Las Bolas De Fuego ("Balls of Fire"), celebrated August 31st. The celebration has two origins, one historical and the other religious. The historical version explains that the local volcano El Playon erupted in November 1658 and forced the villagers of the old Nejapa village (known as Nixapa) to flee and settle at its current location. The religious version explains how Saint Jerome fought the Devil with Fire Balls.

Participants engage in a planned fire-fight to commemorate the volcanic eruption in 1922. Although this is quite dangerous, few bad injuries have been reported.
