= Apopa =

- District
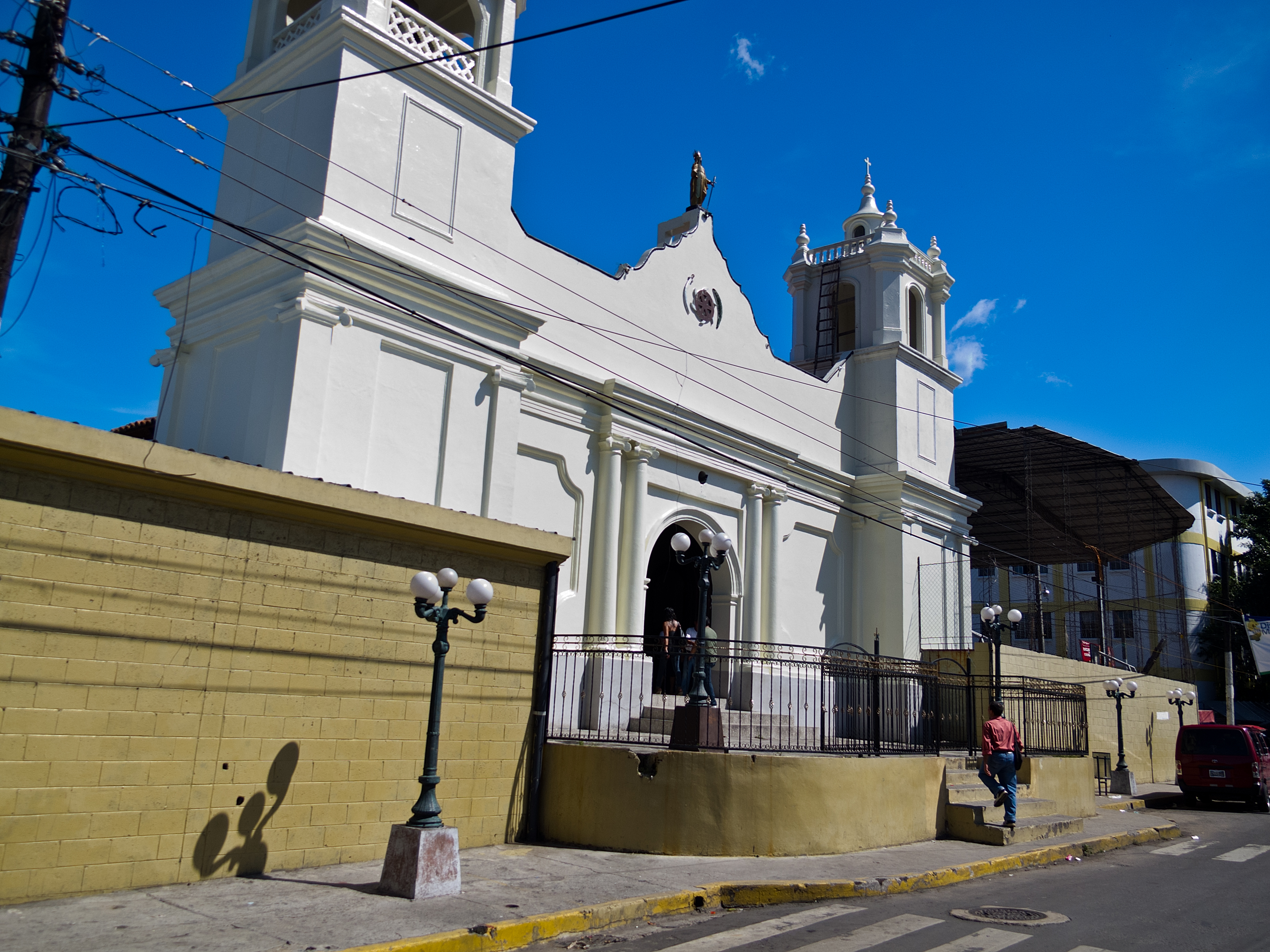
- Santa Catarina Cathedral

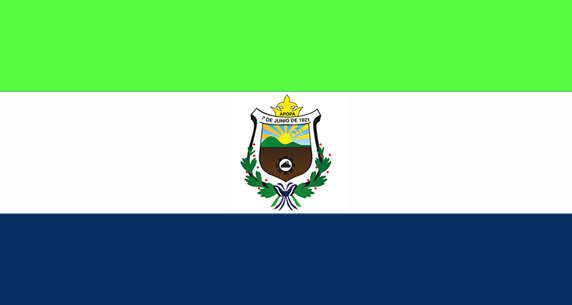
- Flag

- Location in El Salvador
- Coordinates: 13°48′N 89°11′W
- Country: El Salvador
- Department: San Salvador Department
- Metro: San Salvador Metropolitan Area
- Incorporated (town): 1874
- Incorporated (city): 1921

Government
  - Type: Democratic Republic
  - Mayor: Jennifer Juárez

Area
  - District: 20.02 sq mi (51.84 km^{2})

Population (2020)
  - District: 198,528
  - Urban: 198,528
- Time zone: UTC−6 (Central Standard Time)
- SV-SS: CP 1123
- Area code: +503
- Website: alcaldiadeapopa.com (in Spanish)

Apopa is a district in the San Salvador department of El Salvador. Probably the seventh biggest city in El Salvador with a little more than 150,000 people, the city has now collided with Soyapango and San Salvador, making it part of the San Salvador metropolitan area (with a 1,900,000 2010 population estimate).

== Toponymy ==
The toponym Apopa means "a place with mist". lugar depogua.

== Geography ==
Hydrography: The rivers crossing this district are Acelhuate, Las Cañas, Guaycume and Tomayate river.

Dimensions: The area is 51.84 km^{2}

Orography: The hills within this district are El Sartén and El Guaycume hills.

== History ==
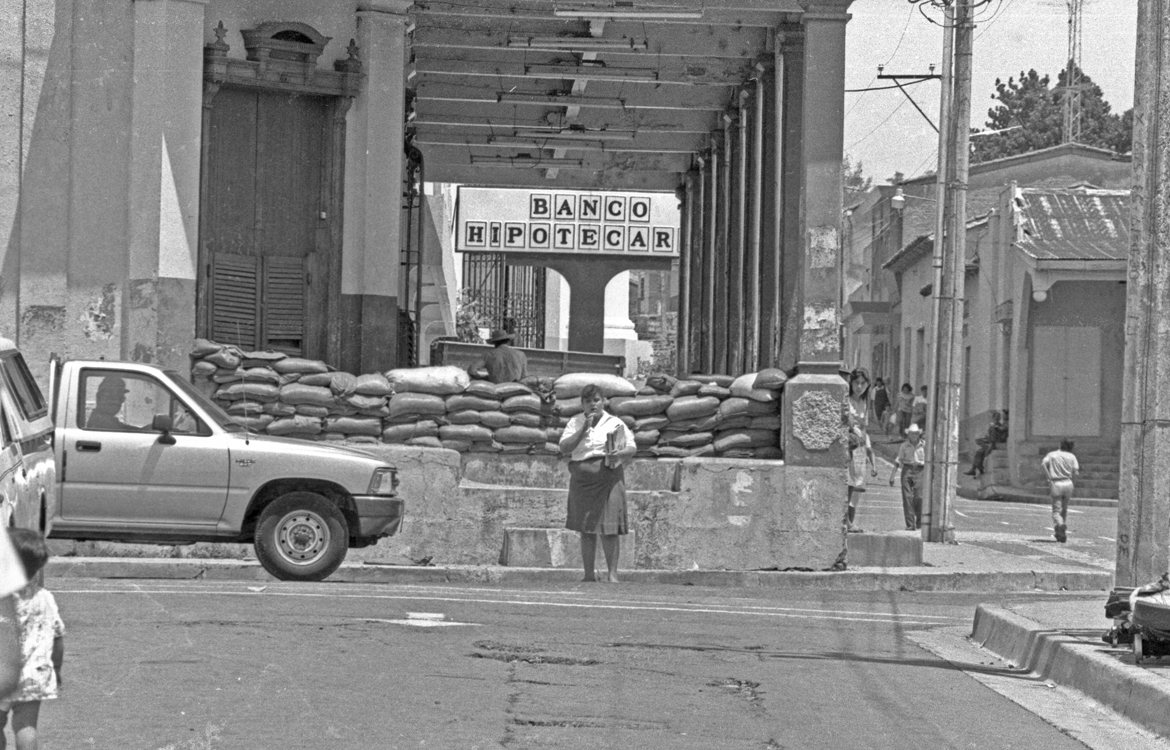
Streets of Apopa in 1990, photographed by Linda Hess Miller

The people of Apopa, were a part of the department of San Salvador from June 12, 1824, until March 9, 1836, when it transferred to the federal district of the Central American Federation until June 30, 1839, when it again returned to a municipality of the northern district of San Salvador with the dissolution of the Central American Federation.

As a municipality, Apopa by November 14, 1860, had a population of 2194. Its jurisdiction included three farms: The Angel Arrasola, San José and San Nicolás. The latter purchased by the Municipal Corporation. To cooperate in their acquisition, the General President of the Republic Don Gerardo Barrios by act of January 28, 1865, made Apopa head of the northern district with jurisdiction over San Martin, Nejapan and Tonacatepeque. On March 7, 1874, during the administration of Field Marshal Don Santiago Gonzales Apopa was awarded the title of Villa Apopa. In 1878 the district increased with the incorporation of the municipality of El Paisnal. In 1892 Apopa stopped being head of the former district and became part of the new district Tonacatepeque. On June 7, 1921, during the administration of Jorge Meléndez Apopa was conferred the title of the city of Villa Apopa.

== Sports ==
The local professional football club is C.D. Vendaval Apopa, which currently plays in the Salvadoran Second Division after merging with AD Chalatenango.

== Gallery ==
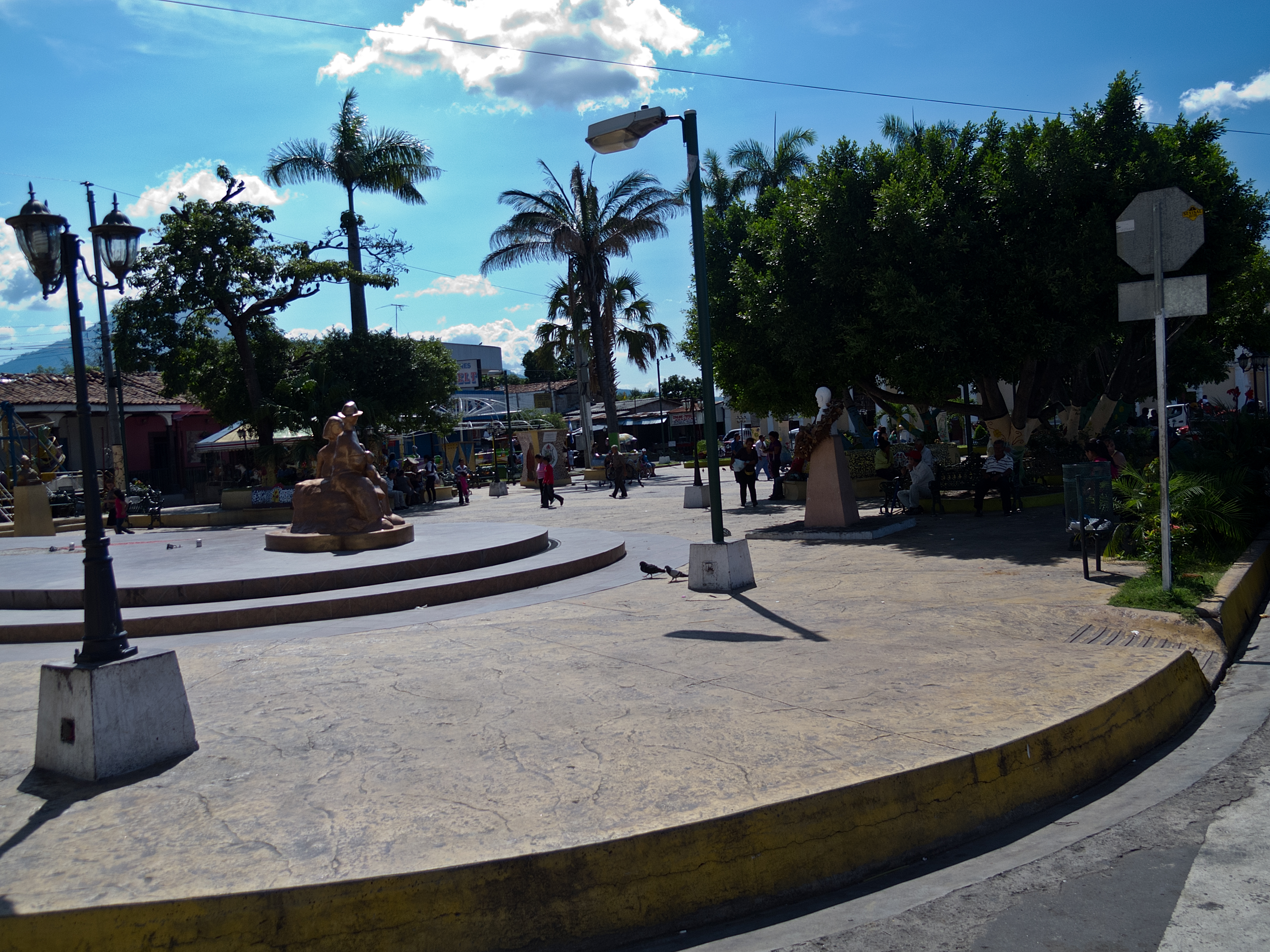
Central park in Apopa

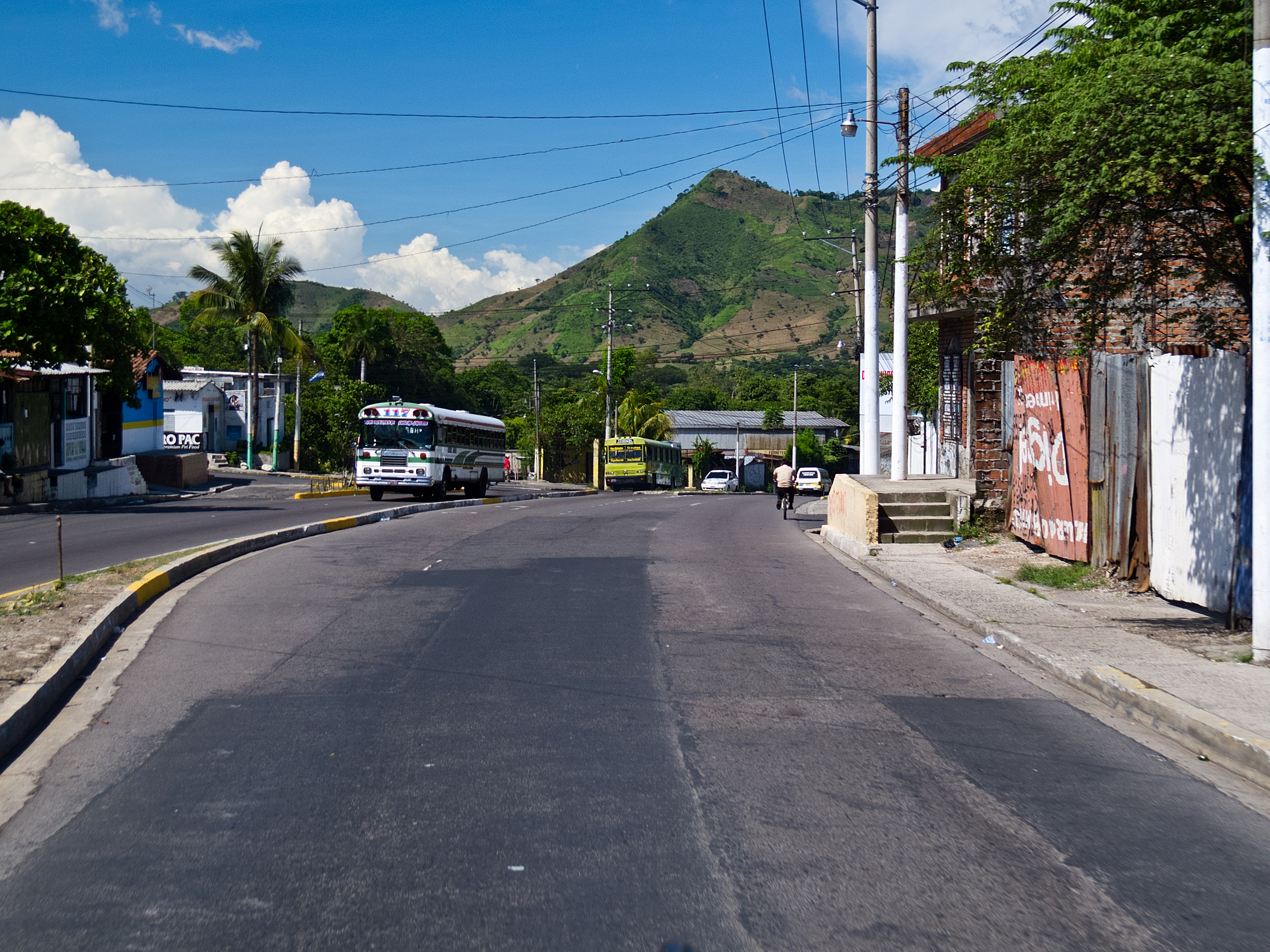
Troncal del Norte Highway (to Honduras) passes through Apopa.

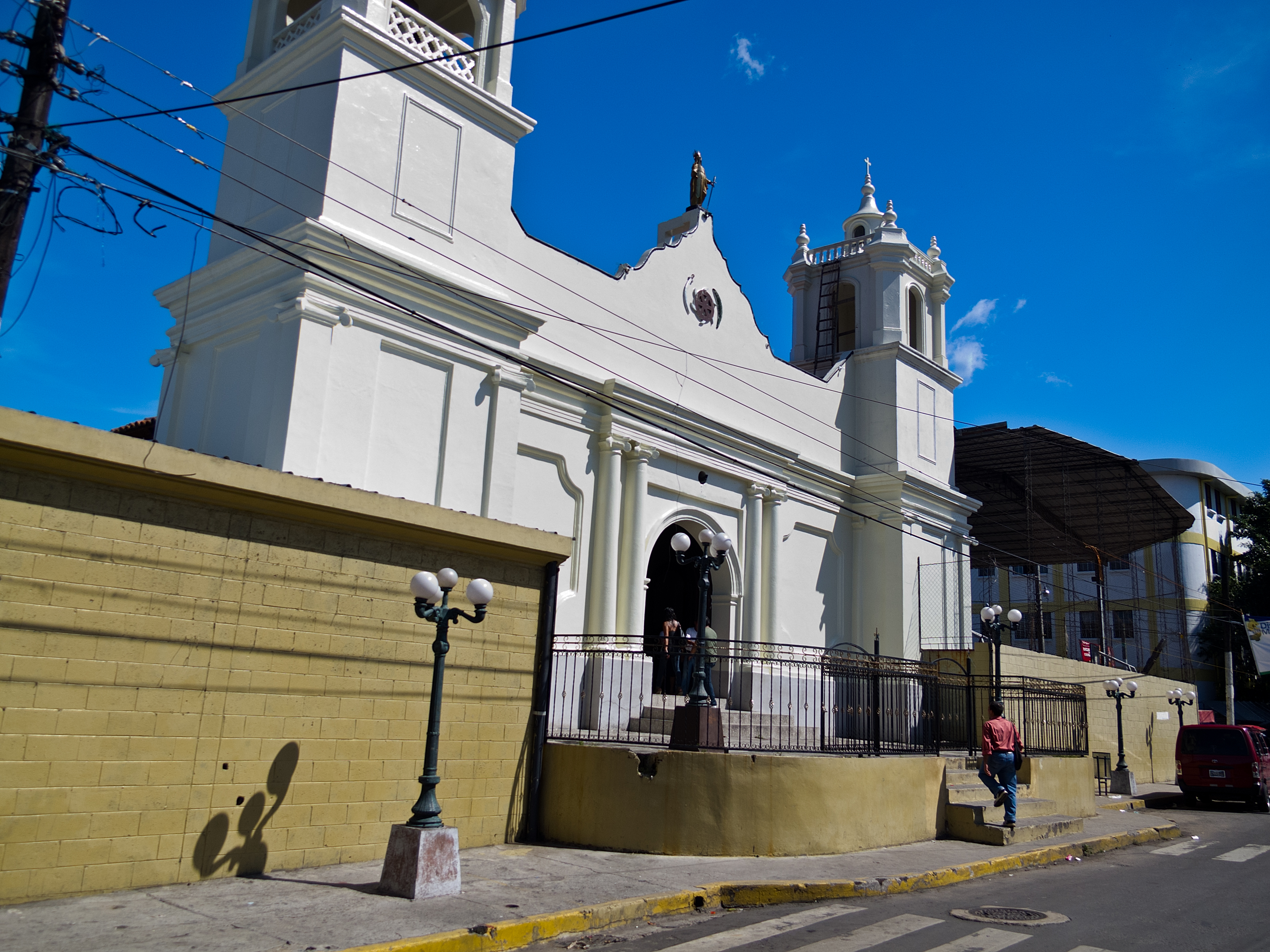
Catholic church in Apopa, across from the Central Park

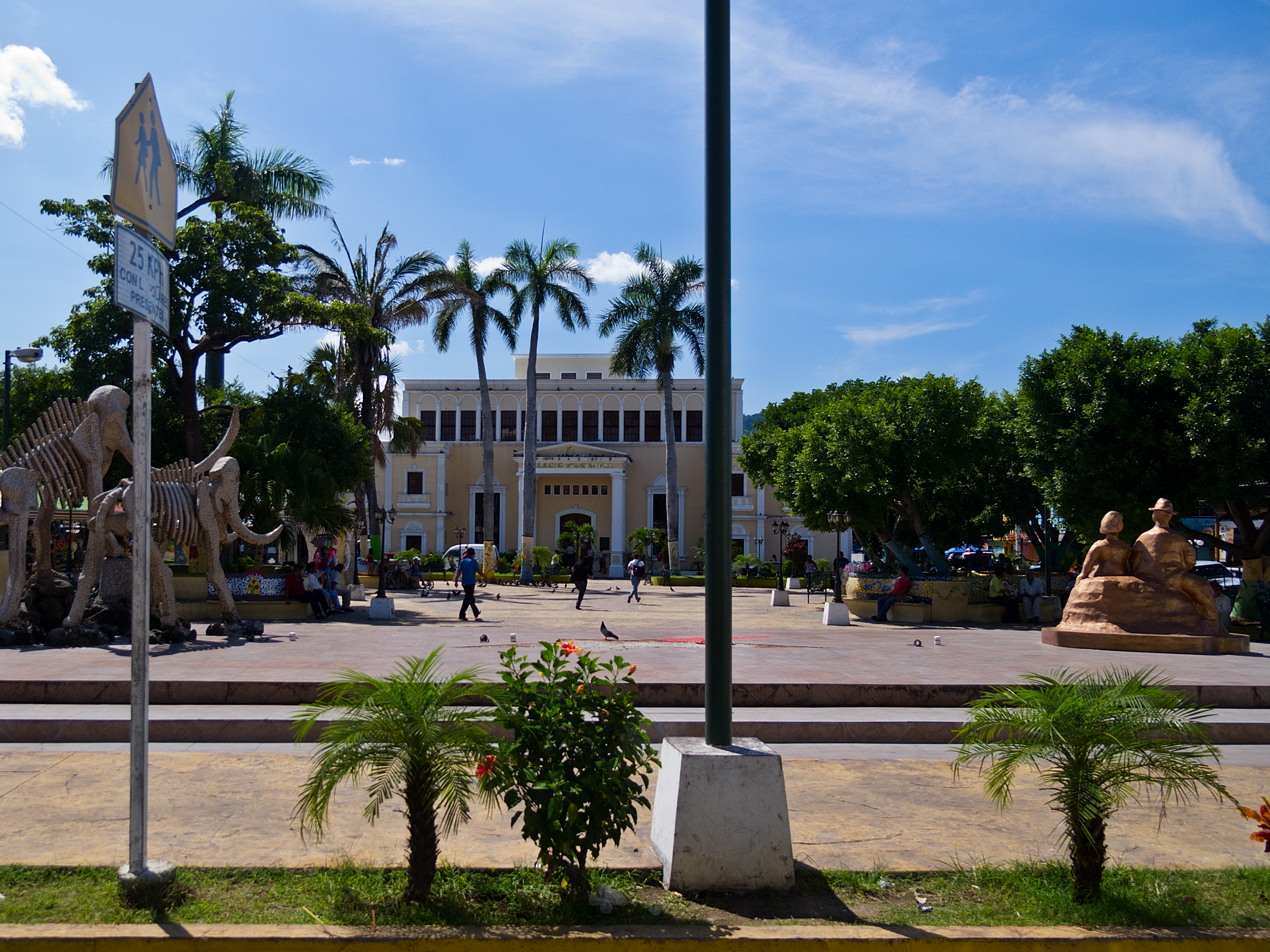
Apopa City Hall
