= San Salvador Department =

Department of El Salvador

San Salvador
- Department
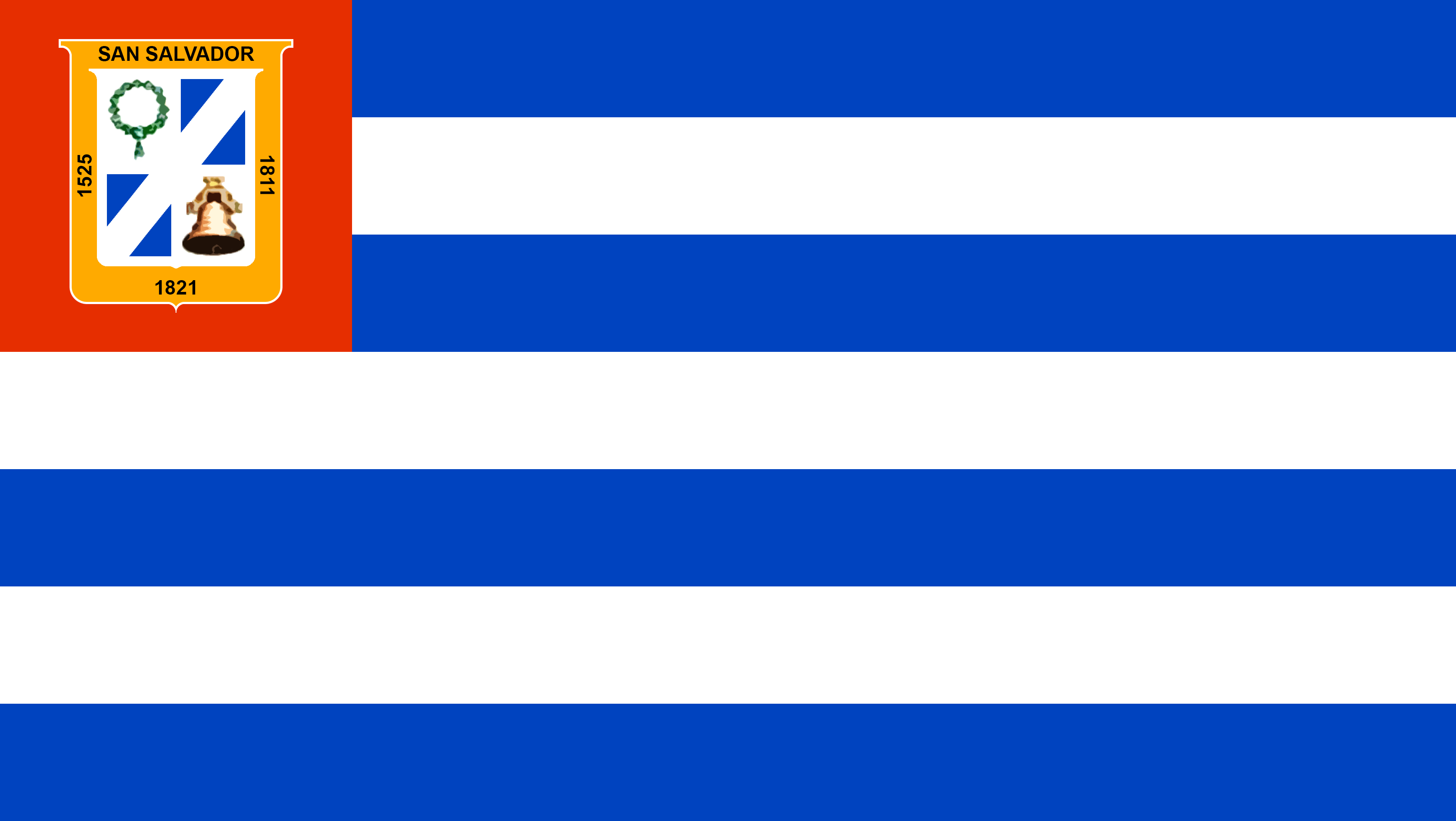
- Flag Coat of arms

- Location within El Salvador
- Coordinates: 13°43′52″N 89°09′40″W
- Country: El Salvador
- Created (given current status): 1824
- Capital: San Salvador

Area
  - Total: 886.2 km^{2} (342.2 sq mi)
  - Rank: Ranked 13th

Population (2024 census)
  - Total: 1,563,371
  - Rank: Ranked 1st
  - Density: 1,764/km^{2} (4,569/sq mi)
- Time zone: UTC−6 (CST)
- ISO 3166 code: SV-SS

San Salvador (Spanish pronunciation: [san salβaˈðoɾ]) is a department of El Salvador in the west central part of the country. The capital is San Salvador, which is also the national capital. The department has North of the Rio Lempa Valley, the "Valle de las Hamacas" (Hammock Valley) and a section of Lake Ilopango. Some of the department's cities that are densely populated are: San Salvador, Ciudad Delgado, Mejicanos, Soyapango, Panchimalco and Apopa. The department covers an area of 886.2 square kilometres (342.2 sq mi) and the last census count in 2024 reported 1,563,371 people. It was classified as a department on June 12, 1824. During the time of the colony, the department was the San Salvador Party, from where territory was taken to make the departments of Chalatenago, La Libertad, Cuscatlán and La Paz. This department produces beans, coffee, sugar cane, etc. for agriculture, on the other hand San Salvador Department holds many headquarters for banking companies in El Salvador and Central America, and for many communication services, also the headquarters of the electric companies are located in the San Salvador Department, last years these companies took a step and started exporting electricity to all Central America. The current mayor of the department is Ernesto Muyshondt (2015–2019).

- Largest city: San Salvador
- Smallest city: Rosario de Mora

== Municipalities ==
1. San Salvador Centro
2. San Salvador Este
3. San Salvador Norte
4. San Salvador Oeste
5. San Salvador Sur

== Districts ==
1. Aguilares
2. Apopa
3. Ayutuxtepeque
4. Cuscatancingo
5. Delgado
6. El Paisnal
7. Guazapa
8. Ilopango
9. Mejicanos
10. Nejapa
11. Panchimalco
12. Rosario de Mora
13. San Marcos
14. San Martín
15. San Salvador
16. Santiago Texacuangos
17. Santo Tomás
18. Soyapango
19. Tonacatepeque
