= San Marcos, El Salvador =

San Marcos
- District
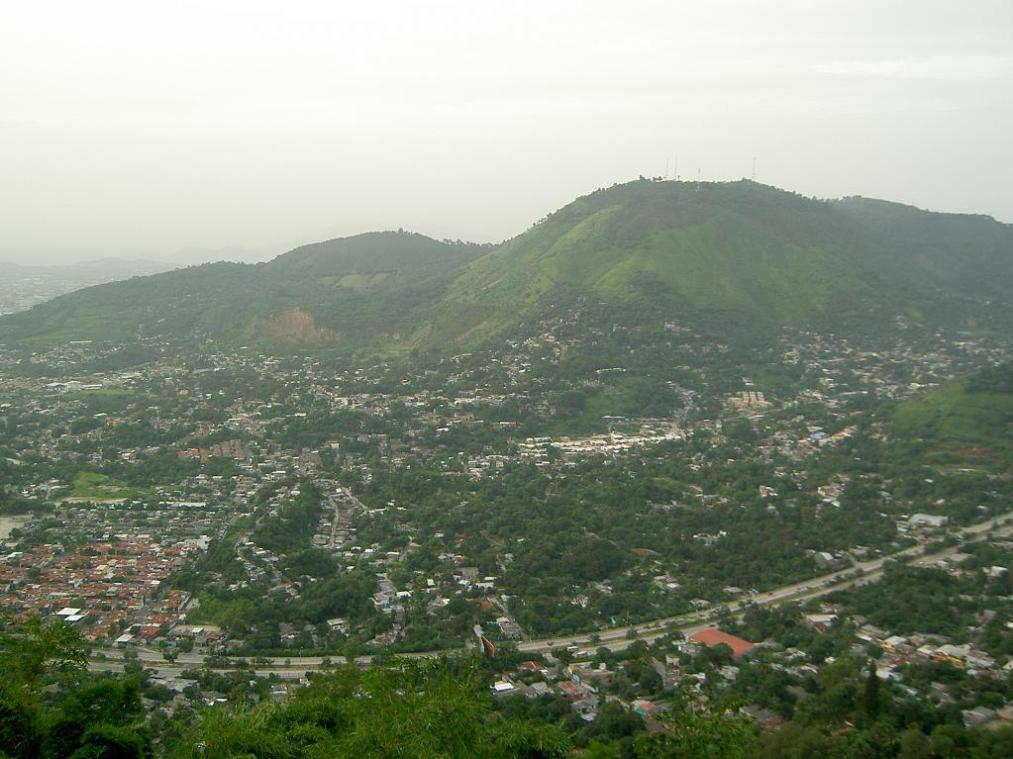
- San Marcos seen from Los Planes de Renderos Hill

- Location in El Salvador
- Coordinates: 13°39′N 89°11′W
- Country: El Salvador
- Department: San Salvador Department

Area
  - Total: 5.7 sq mi (14.7 km^{2})
- Elevation: 2,608 ft (795 m)

Population (2024)
  - Total: 57,094
  - Urban/Settlement: 56,221

San Marcos is a district in El Salvador. It is located in a small valley, 5 miles (8 km) southeast of downtown San Salvador. It has a population of 63,209. San Marcos is one of the 14 municipalities which make up the Metropolitan Area of San Salvador, also known as Greater San Salvador.

== Geography ==
The city's geography is characterized by numerous small hills, as well as its proximity to Mount San Jacinto to the north and Planes de Renderos hills to the south. Most of San Marcos is a residential suburb with many middle-income and low-income dwellings. The city is the main gateway for air travelers because it is bordered by the Comalapa Highway (RN-5 (Autopista Comalapa)), the freeway that connects El Salvador International Airport with San Salvador.

== Economy ==
Not much commerce exists outside the municipal public market and the southeast bus station.

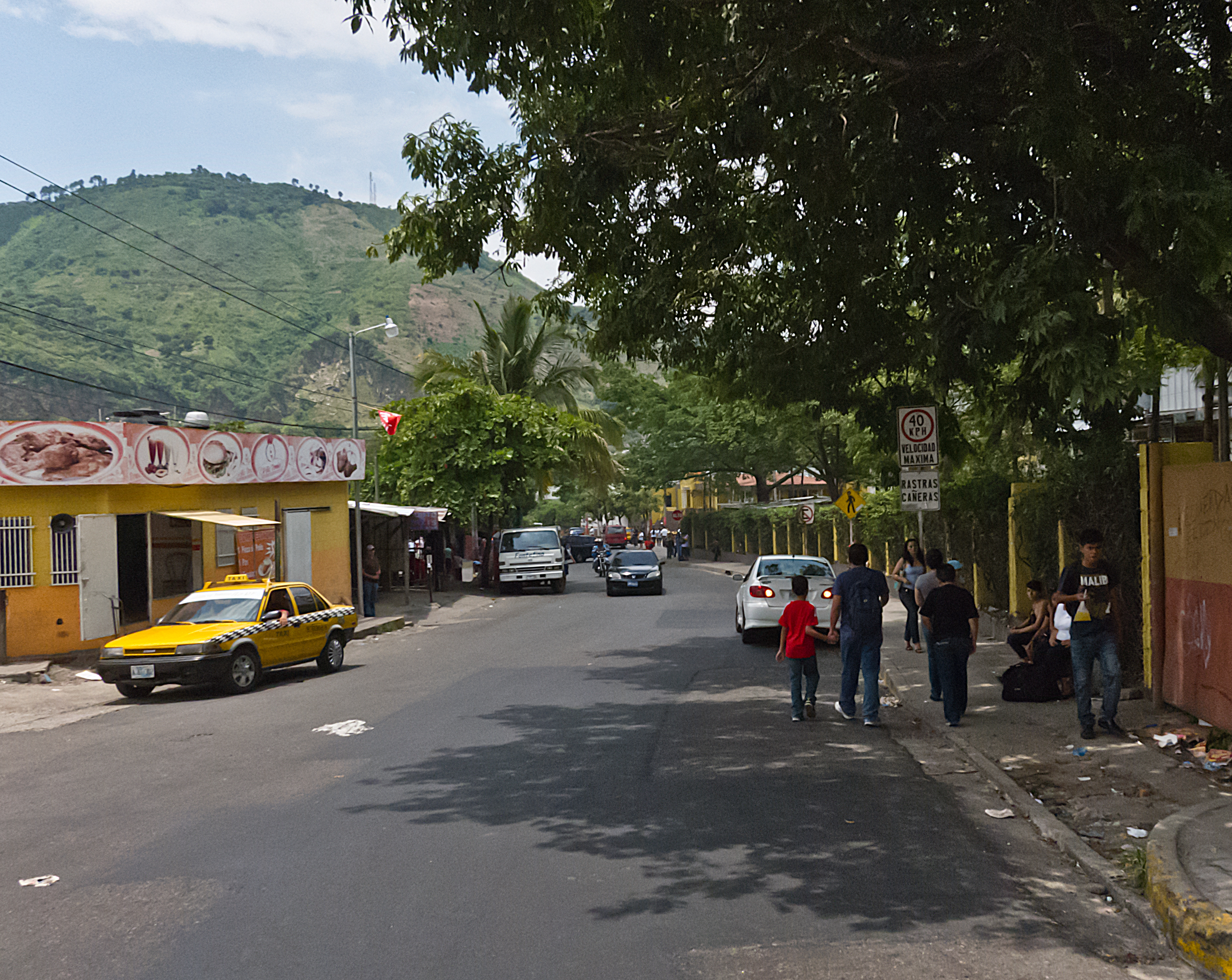
Streets of San Marcos, El Salvador

However, there is a significant textile industry in the San Marcos Free Trade Zone. There are also logistic/distribution companies along the Comalapa Highway.

The city's per capita GDP(PPP) is US $5,480 and it has a Human Development Index of 0.759 as of 2002.

== Government versus gangs ==
In 2024, the government of El Salvador conducted a Blockade of San Marcos, especially in the 10th of October (10 de Octubre) community. That operation was directed against gangs in the area.
