= Ilopango =

- District

- Location in El Salvador
- Coordinates: 13°42′N 89°07′W
- Country: El Salvador
- Department: San Salvador Department

Government
  - Mayor: Salvador Ruano (Nationalist Republican Alliance)

Area
  - District: 13.4 sq mi (34.6 km^{2})
- Elevation: 1,978 ft (603 m)

Population (2020)
  - District: 142,979
  - Urban: 142,979

Ilopango is a town and district in the San Salvador department of El Salvador. It is a few miles east of the nation's capital, San Salvador and part of the San Salvador metropolitan area. It is located near Lake Ilopango, the country's largest lake at 72 square kilometers.

== Overview ==
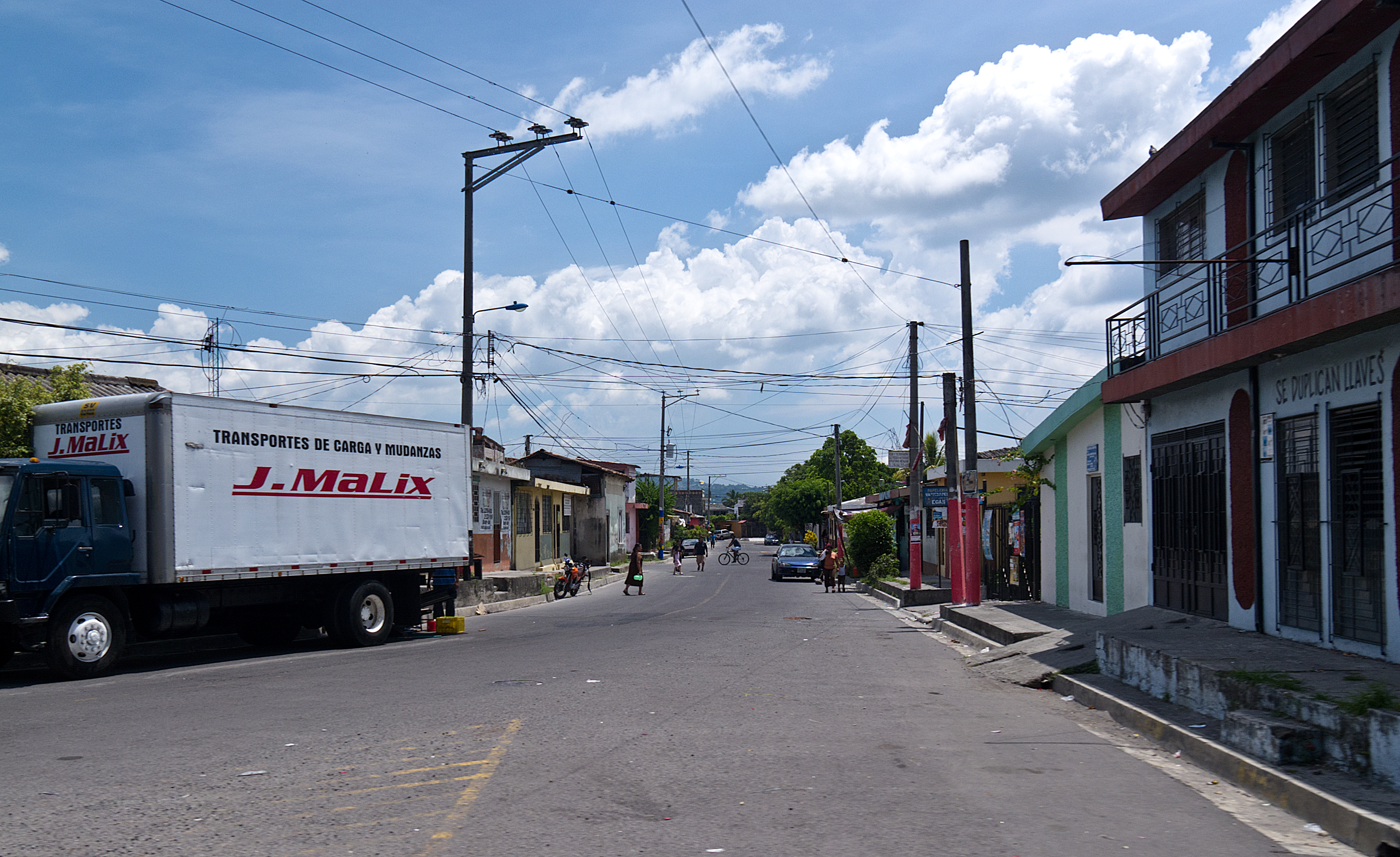
Street in Ilopango

El Salvador's second airport is in Ilopango. It is currently used for charter flights and by the Salvadoran military but plans are underway to increase its use as tourism and travel in El Salvador increase and Comalapa International Airport cannot handle the future influx alone. The Civil Aviation Authority has its headquarters on the airport property, in Ilopango.

== Climate ==
Climate data for Ilopango (1991–2020)
Month	Jan	Feb	Mar	Apr	May	Jun	Jul	Aug	Sep	Oct	Nov	Dec	Year
Record high °C (°F)	35.4 (95.7)	37.0 (98.6)	37.5 (99.5)	38.0 (100.4)	38.6 (101.5)	35.2 (95.4)	37.2 (99.0)	34.4 (93.9)	33.3 (91.9)	33.5 (92.3)	34.2 (93.6)	34.6 (94.3)	38.6 (101.5)
Mean daily maximum °C (°F)	31.3 (88.3)	32.5 (90.5)	33.2 (91.8)	33.0 (91.4)	31.3 (88.3)	30.3 (86.5)	30.8 (87.4)	30.7 (87.3)	29.8 (85.6)	29.7 (85.5)	30.1 (86.2)	30.7 (87.3)	31.1 (88.0)
Daily mean °C (°F)	23.1 (73.6)	23.9 (75.0)	24.7 (76.5)	25.4 (77.7)	24.9 (76.8)	24.3 (75.7)	24.3 (75.7)	24.2 (75.6)	23.7 (74.7)	23.6 (74.5)	23.3 (73.9)	23.1 (73.6)	24.0 (75.2)
Mean daily minimum °C (°F)	17.5 (63.5)	18.1 (64.6)	19.0 (66.2)	20.4 (68.7)	20.9 (69.6)	20.5 (68.9)	20.0 (68.0)	20.1 (68.2)	20.1 (68.2)	19.9 (67.8)	18.8 (65.8)	17.9 (64.2)	19.4 (66.9)
Record low °C (°F)	12.3 (54.1)	11.5 (52.7)	12.5 (54.5)	10.5 (50.9)	13.0 (55.4)	16.2 (61.2)	13.8 (56.8)	14.0 (57.2)	14.0 (57.2)	12.5 (54.5)	11.8 (53.2)	11.5 (52.7)	10.5 (50.9)
Average precipitation mm (inches)	1.7 (0.07)	1.2 (0.05)	10.7 (0.42)	42.1 (1.66)	192.8 (7.59)	264.5 (10.41)	302.1 (11.89)	318.5 (12.54)	331.9 (13.07)	245.4 (9.66)	65.0 (2.56)	5.6 (0.22)	1,781.3 (70.13)
Average precipitation days (≥ 1.0 mm)	0.3	0.4	1.0	3.6	11.2	14.5	16.1	18.3	18.0	13.0	4.1	0.9	101.4
Source: NOAA
