= Soyapango =

- District
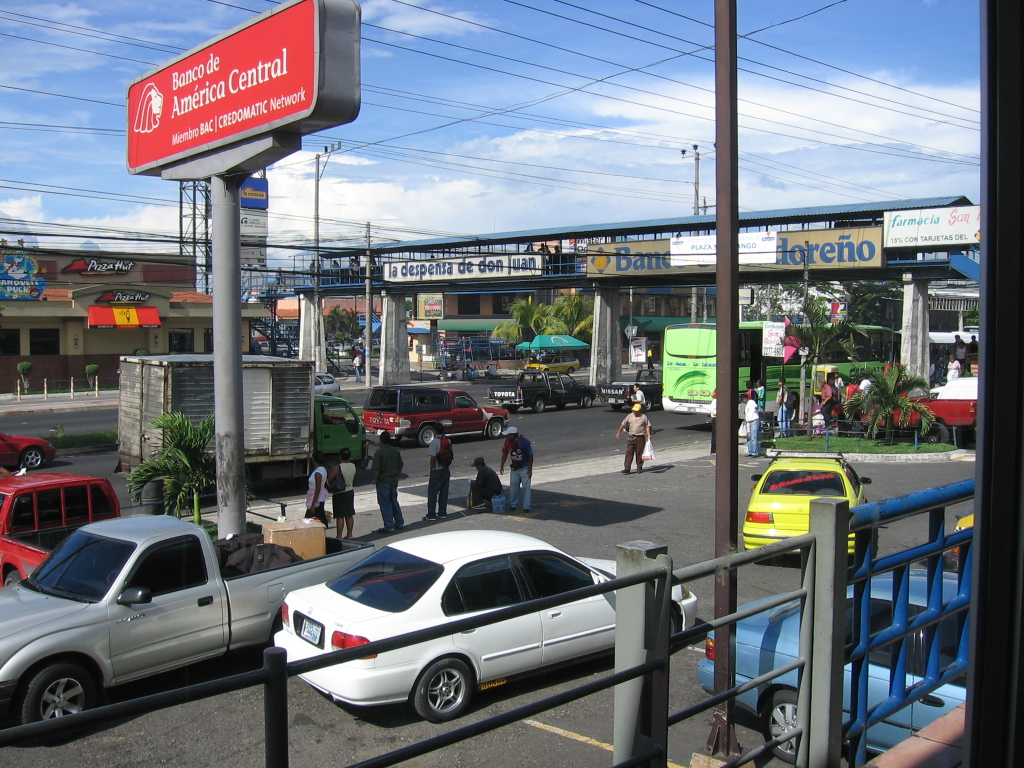

- Location in El Salvador
- Coordinates: 13°44′N 89°09′W
- Country: El Salvador
- Department: San Salvador Department
- Metro: San Salvador Metropolitan Area

Government
  - Mayor: Nercy Montano (Nuevas Ideas)

Population (2020)
  - District: 284,659
  - Rank: 2nd
  - Urban: 284,659
- Time zone: UTC−6 (Central Standard Time)
- SV-SS: CP 1116
- Area code: +503
- Website: soyapango.gob.sv/

Soyapango is a district in the San Salvador department of El Salvador. Soyapango is the country's largest municipality with 284,700 residents. Soyapango is a satellite city of San Salvador and it is the main thoroughfare between San Salvador and the eastern part of the country, and nearly 70,000 vehicles travel through it every day. The nickname for this satellite city is Soya.

== Economy ==
Empresas ADOC, the largest shoe manufacturer in Central America, has its headquarters in Soyapango.

Most economic activity in Soyapango is related to forestry.

== Geography ==
It is limited by the following municipalities: the north by Delgado and Tonacatepeque; to the east by Ilopango, on the south by St. Thomas and San Marcos, and the west by San Salvador and Delgado. It is located between the geographic coordinates 13° 44'42 "LN (northern end) and 13° 39'58" LN (southern end), 89° 06'57 "LWG (eastern end) and 89° 10'16" LWG (far west) .

=== Soils ===
Soils predominate in the municipality of type: 1) and Regosols Andosols, which are areas that form rolling and rolling country areas, 2) Regosols, and Andosols Latosols reddish clay, which are land areas that form of hills and mountains of the belt volcanic foothills or lower slopes of the volcanoes or volcanic massifs. In this area dominated by rock types of pyroclastic material.

=== Hydrography ===
Water the town river Las Cañas, Acelhuate, Tapachula, Chantecuán, El Sauce, and Chagiiite Sumpa and Arenal streams, and other unnamed Aposento. The main rivers are the reeds and the Acelhuate.

The river Las Cañas was born in the town of Ilopango, and enters Soyapango to 2.4 miles east of the city, describing a path from south to north. Its course and divided the territory and Tonacatepeque Ilopango. Its rivers tributaries Chantecuán, El Sauce, Zapotitán, bananas and Sumpa, and streams and Arenal The Pavas Seco. It has a length within the municipality of 5.5 kilometers.

Acelhuate River rises in the municipality of San Salvador. Enter Soyapango to 2.3 miles west of the city, describing a course from south to north. Its course divides this territory and those of Delgado and San Salvador. Its tributaries to the river gorge Tapachula and El Arenal. Describes a trip within the municipality of 3.5 kilometers.

=== Terrain ===
This town has a topography ranging from rolling hills to rugged mountains, mostly prominently to the South. The landscape of the area has two geological features: Cerro El Mirador and Mount San Jacinto. Mount San Jacinto is the most prominent one. Located 3.1 miles southwest of the city of Soyapango, its summit serves as a marker for the municipal boundaries of San Marcos, San Salvador and Soyapango. It has an elevation of 1151.93 meters above sea level.

=== Climate ===
The amount of annual rainfall varies between 1.700 and 1.850 mm.

== Sports ==
The local professional football club is named C.D. Marte Soyapango and it currently plays in the Salvadoran Second Division.
