= Delgado, El Salvador =

Ciudad Delgado
- District
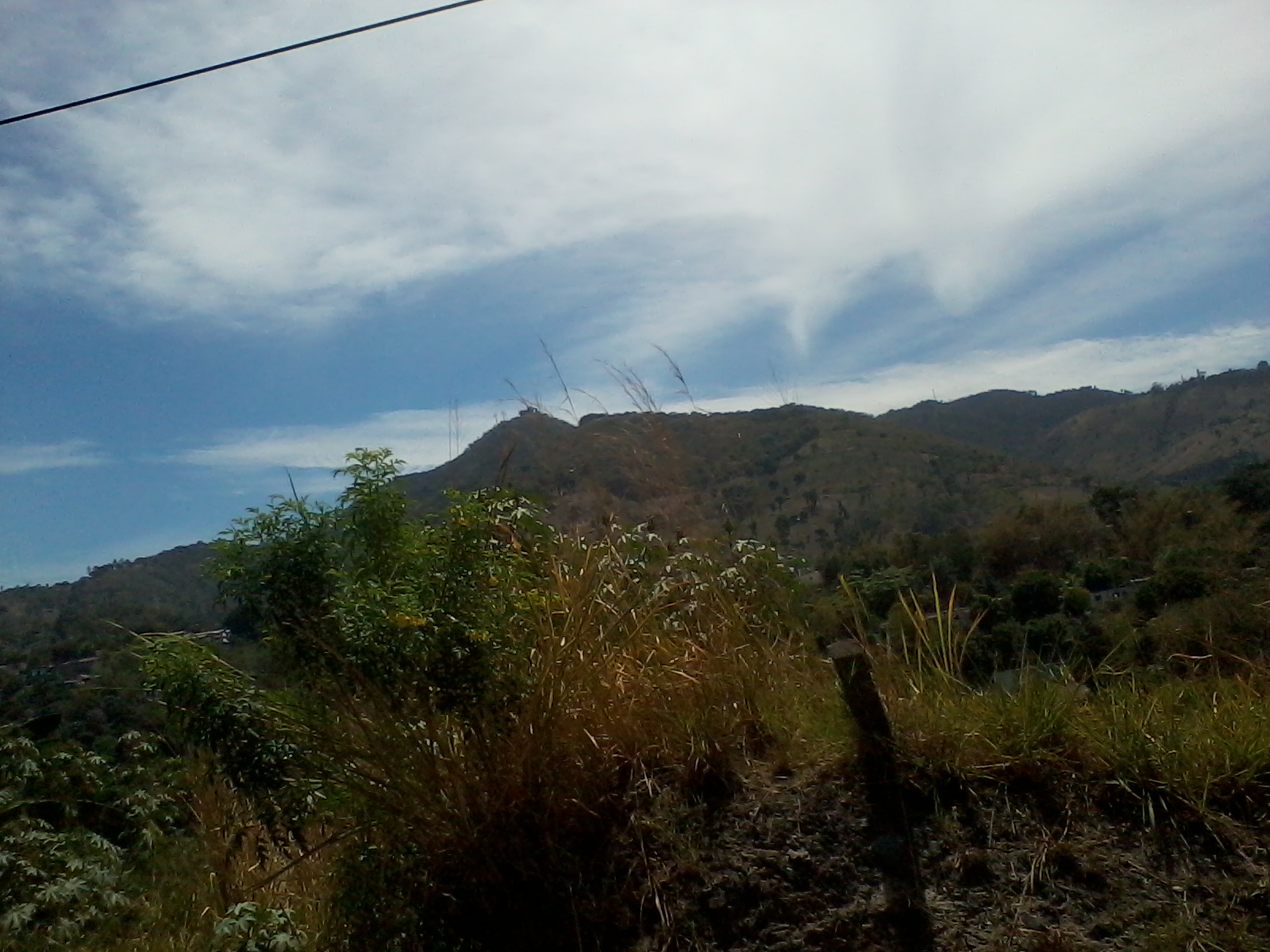
- Delgado, San Salvador, El Salvador

- Location in El Salvador
- Coordinates: 13°43′N 89°10′W
- Country: El Salvador
- Department: San Salvador Department

Area
  - District: 12.9 sq mi (33.4 km^{2})
- Elevation: 1,978 ft (603 m)

Population (2020)
  - District: 126,839
  - Urban: 118,341

Ciudad Delgado is a district in the San Salvador department of El Salvador. It is a part of the Metropolitan Area of San Salvador.
