= ISO 3166-2:SV =

Entry for El Salvador in ISO 3166-2

ISO 3166-2:SV is the entry for El Salvador in ISO 3166-2, part of the ISO 3166 standard published by the International Organization for Standardization (ISO), which defines codes for the names of the principal subdivisions (e.g., provinces or states) of all countries coded in ISO 3166-1.

Currently for El Salvador, ISO 3166-2 codes are defined for 14 departments.

Each code consists of two parts, separated by a hyphen. The first part is SV, the ISO 3166-1 alpha-2 code of El Salvador. The second part is two letters.

== Current codes ==
Subdivision names are listed as in the ISO 3166-2 standard published by the ISO 3166 Maintenance Agency (ISO 3166/MA).

Subdivision names are sorted in Spanish alphabetical order: a-n, ñ, o-z.

Click on the button in the header to sort each column.

Code	Subdivision name (es)
SV-AH	Ahuachapán
SV-CA	Cabañas
SV-CH	Chalatenango
SV-CU	Cuscatlán
SV-LI	La Libertad
SV-PA	La Paz
SV-UN	La Unión
SV-MO	Morazán
SV-SM	San Miguel
SV-SS	San Salvador
SV-SV	San Vicente
SV-SA	Santa Ana
SV-SO	Sonsonate
SV-US	Usulután

== See also ==
- Subdivisions of El Salvador
- FIPS region codes of El Salvador
- Neighbouring countries: GT, HN
