= Cuscatancingo =

- District
- Seal

- Location in El Salvador
- Coordinates: 13°44′N 89°11′W
- Country: El Salvador
- Department: San Salvador Department
- Elevation: 1,978 ft (603 m)

Population (2020)
  - District: 86,964
  - Urban: 86,964

Cuscatancingo is a district in the San Salvador department of El Salvador. It is located about 4 kilometres (2.5 mi) from the city of San Salvador and has a population of about 50,000. It is part of the San Salvador metropolitan area.

The geographical coordinates are 13.73611°N 89.18139°W
