= Central America under Mexican rule =

History of Central America (1822–1823)

Captaincy General of Guatemala Capitanía General de Guatemala
- Captaincy general of Mexico
- 1822–1823
- Flag

- A map of the First Mexican Empire (1822–1823) with Central America shown in pink
- Demonym: Central American
- Area
  - 1822–1823: 445,683 km^{2} (172,079 sq mi)
- Government
  - Type: Captaincy general
- Head of State (Note: Agustín de Iturbide used the title "President of the Regency Council" until 19 May 1822, after which, he used the title Emperor of Mexico as Agustín I. After the abolition of the monarchy, Nicolás Bravo, Guadalupe Victoria, and Pedro Negrete each served as joint heads of state.)
  - 1822–1823: Agustín de Iturbide
  - 1823: Nicolás Bravo; Guadalupe Victoria; Pedro Negrete
- Captain general
  - 1822: Gabino Gaínza
  - 1822; 1823: Vicente Filísola
  - 1822–1823: Felipe Codallos
- Historical era: Decolonization of the Americas
  - Annexation requested: 28 November 1821
  - Annexed by Mexico: 5 January 1822
  - Iturbide's abdication: 19 March 1823
  - Independence declared: 1 July 1823
Preceded by	Succeeded by
Consultive Junta	United Provinces of Central America; Supreme Executive Power

From January 1822 to July 1823, the Captaincy General of Guatemala, a former Spanish colony, was controlled by the First Mexican Empire, and briefly, the Supreme Executive Power—the provisional government that succeeded Mexican imperial rule. The captaincy general consisted of the provinces of Chiapas, Costa Rica, El Salvador, Guatemala, Honduras, and Nicaragua—the six southernmost provinces of the Mexican Empire. The incorporation of Central America brought Mexico to the height of its territorial extent.

Only two months after the Act of Independence of Central America was signed in September 1821, Regent of Mexico Agustín de Iturbide, who later became the emperor of Mexico in May 1822, made a formal request to the Consultive Junta of Guatemala City—the Central American government—to accept annexation to the Mexican Empire. His request was accepted on 5 January 1822. Despite the acceptance by the Guatemalan-based government, El Salvador, Costa Rica, and parts of Nicaragua resisted Mexican annexation, and Mexican and allied Guatemalan soldiers were mobilized to subjugate those regions.

Mexican and allied Guatemalan forces were commanded by Brigadier Vicente Filísola, who was serving as the captain general of the Central American provinces. Just over a year was spent on a military campaign that defeated the resistance and ended in the annexation of El Salvador in February 1823. In Costa Rica, the government declared independence from Mexico in October 1822, however, a coup d'état by pro-Mexican monarchists in March 1823 led to the outbreak of a civil war. The Ochomogo War of April 1823 deposed the monarchist government and reestablished the secessionist government. Meanwhile, a rebellion in Nicaragua led by José Anacleto Ordóñez sought to overthrow the incumbent Nicaraguan government.

Before Filísola could continue to Nicaragua and Costa Rica after his victory in El Salvador, Iturbide was forced to abdicate the Mexican imperial throne and go into exile, and a provisional government was established after the abolition of the monarchy. As a result, Filísola abandoned his orders to continue the conquest of Central America and convened a congress of Central American political leaders to determine the future of Central America. On 1 July 1823, the Central American congress declared independence from Mexico and established the United Provinces of Central America, later known as the Federal Republic of Central America, which existed until its dissolution in 1841 after the First and Second Central American Civil Wars. Not all of Central America chose to become independent, however, as Chiapas remained a part of Mexico and is now one of the country's 31 states.

== Independence of New Spain ==
=== Mexican independence ===
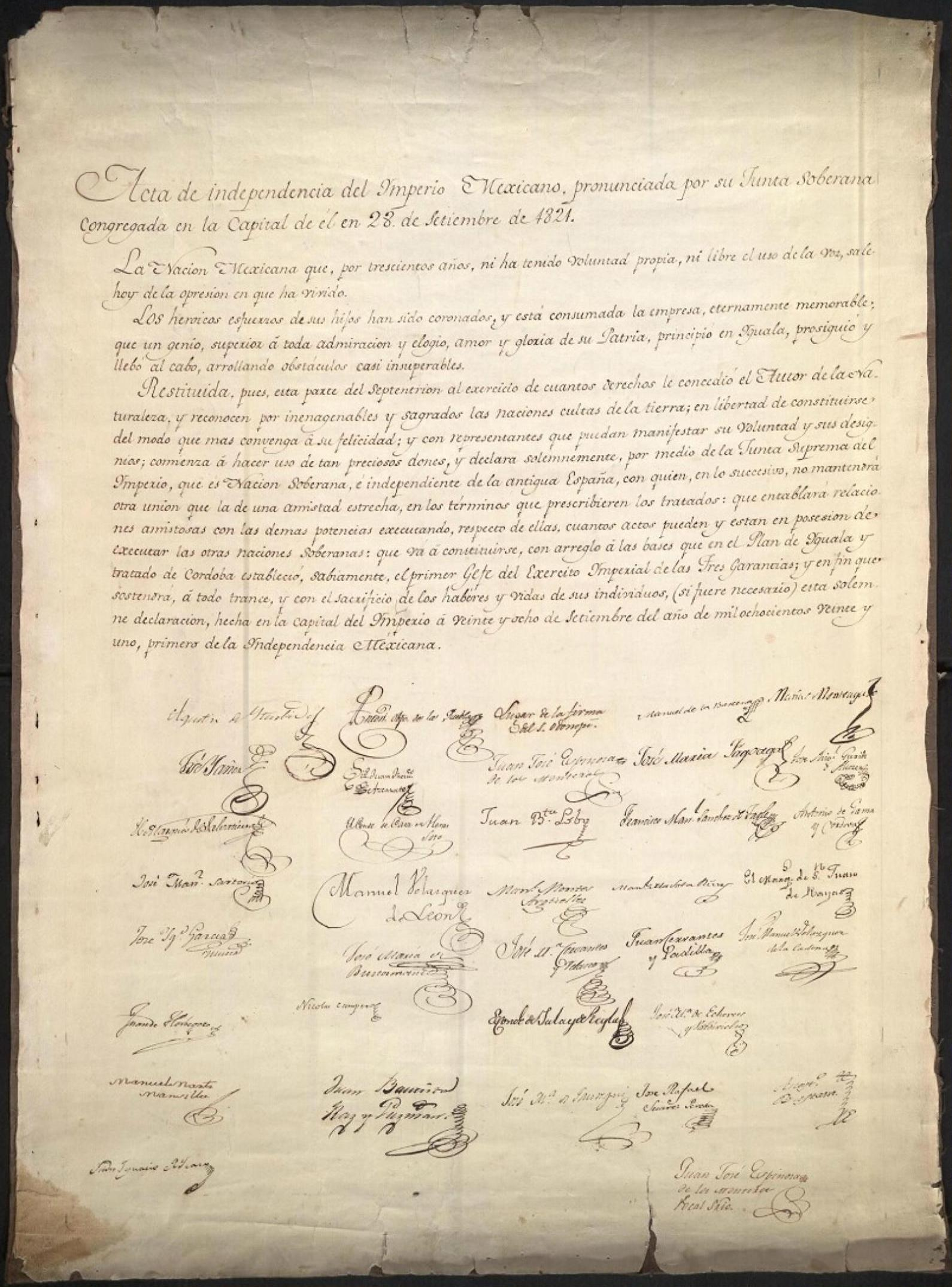
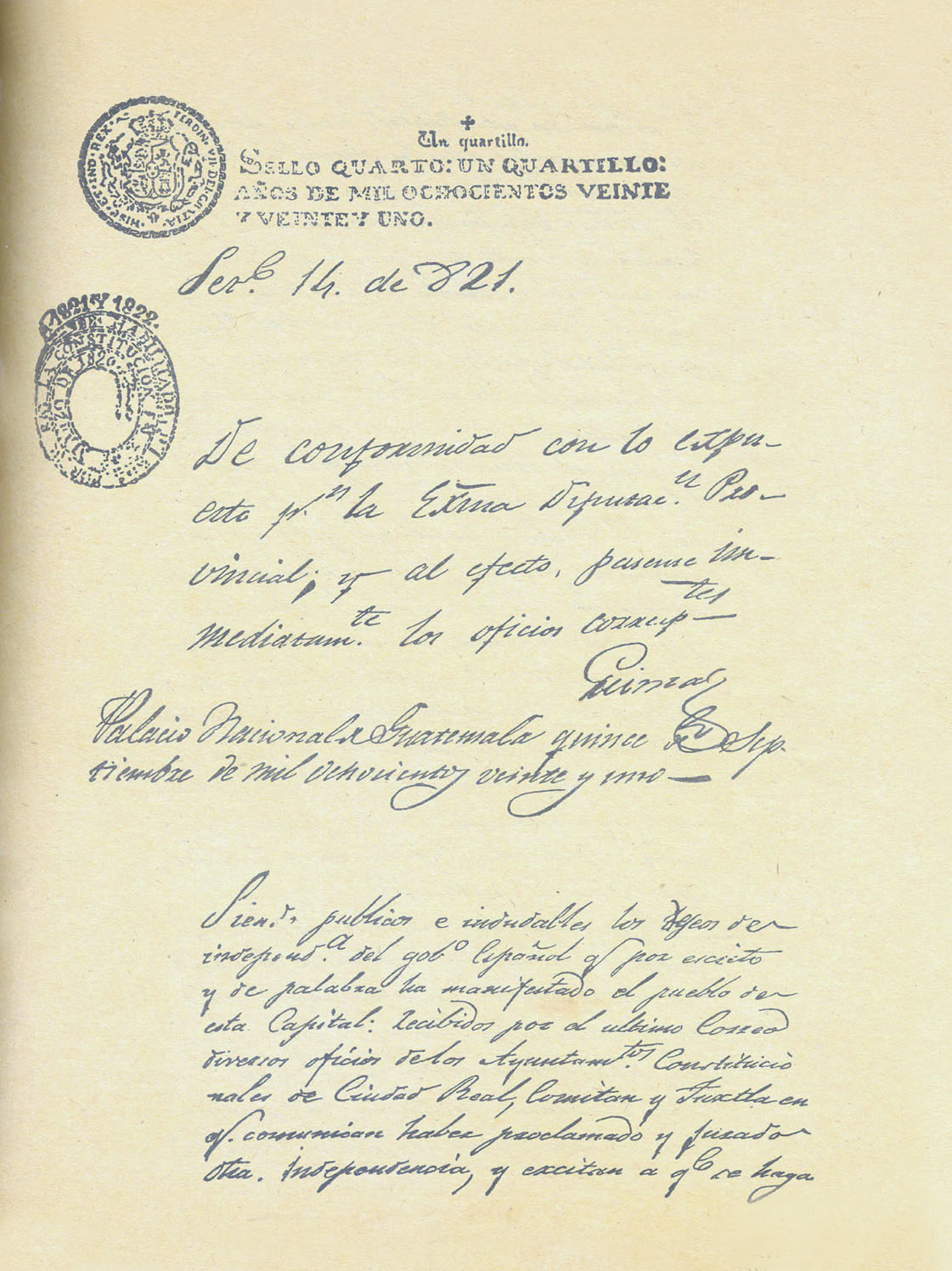
The declarations of independence of Mexico (left) and Central America (right)

On 16 September 1810, criollo priest Miguel Hidalgo y Costilla issued the Cry of Dolores, a call for Mexican independence from the Spanish Empire. This began the Mexican War of Independence in New Spain, Spain's colony that encompassed modern-day Mexico, Central America, and the southwestern United States. Hidalgo's declaration was a reaction to the French invasion of Spain; the invasion overthrew Spanish King Ferdinand VII and replaced him with Napoleon's brother, Joseph. Although Ferdinand was restored as king of Spain in 1814, some in New Spain were not satisfied with his reign as the constitution of 1812 was suspended. In 1820, high-ranking military officers in New Spain demanded that the constitution be reinstated.

On 24 February 1821, Agustín de Iturbide, a Mexican general fighting for independence, published his Plan of the Three Guarantees in the city of Iguala. This plan outlined his vision for the new independent Mexican state. It contained three key provisions: the establishment of a constitutional monarchy, that Catholicism would be the state religion (receiving special protections), and that the army and people of both European descent and mestizos (people of mixed-European and indigenous ancestry) would also receive special protections. Iturbide invited Ferdinand, any member of Ferdinand's immediate family, or any other Spanish Bourbon prince to rule as the emperor of Mexico. Until an emperor could be appointed, Iturbide held the position of president of the regency council unopposed.

After 11 years of war between Mexican independence forces and Spanish royalist forces, Mexico attained full independence in 1821 with the Treaty of Córdoba on 24 August and the Declaration of Independence of the Mexican Empire on 28 September; Spain later rejected the Treaty of Córdoba in February 1822, and the Mexicans interpreted this rejection as Ferdinand and the Bourbons also rejecting the Mexican throne.

=== Central American independence ===
Central America had been administered as a colony of Spain under the Captaincy General of Guatemala (also known as the Kingdom of Guatemala) since 1568. The region launched rebellions in 1811 and 1814 to gain independence, but both were suppressed by Spanish forces. Gabino Gaínza, the captain general of Guatemala, initially opposed independence but changed his mind once proponents of independence told him that he could remain as captain general even after independence. On 15 September 1821, Central America declared independence from Spain with the signing of the Act of Independence of Central America in Guatemala City. Central America pursued independence in part because of Iturbide's Plan of the Three Guarantees, which was very popular within Central America.

Upon independence, the Captaincy General of Guatemala was abolished. The captaincy general's former provinces—Costa Rica, El Salvador, Guatemala, Honduras, and Nicaragua—united under the Consultive Junta, a provisional national government was established in Guatemala to form a formal federal government for Central America. Elections for a permanent government were scheduled to occur on 1 March 1822. The Spanish-appointed provincial governors remained in place and continued to exercise their authority after independence was declared. (Note: The Spanish provincial governors of Central America at the time of independence were: Juan Manuel de Cañas y Trujillo (Costa Rica), Pedro Ortiz de la Barriere Castro (El Salvador), Gabino Gaínza y Fernández de Medrano (Guatemala), José Gregorio Tinoco de Contreras (Honduras), Miguel González Saravia y Colarte (Nicaragua).) The independence of Central America was not considered to be a priority by Spain due to its relative insignificance in comparison to their other colonies of New Granada, northern New Spain (Mexico), and Peru, which they were still fighting for control of.

== Central American infighting over annexation ==
Immediately after independence, the idea of annexation to Mexico divided the Central American ruling class. Monarchist politicians preferred annexation due to their ideological alignment to the monarchist Mexican Empire and their belief that Central America was "unable to handle the problems of independence alone". Others argued that annexation would also help diversify the region's economy, which was mostly dependent on indigo exports, and open trade to Mexico and Europe. Meanwhile, nationalists and republicans opposed annexation and wished to retain independence due to their ideological differences with Mexico.

Gaínza (who had since assumed the political leadership of both Guatemala and the Consultive Junta), Nicaraguan Bishop Nicolás García Jerez, and the Guatemalan Aycinena clan supported annexation. Politicians from the Nicaraguan city of León were in favor of annexation. In the Honduran city of Comayagua, Brigadier José Gregorio Tinoco de Contreras, the political chief of Honduras, rejected the legitimacy of the independent Central American government and swore his loyalty to the Plan of the Three Guarantees. The question of annexation to Mexico or independence was not important to the majority of indigenous Central Americans as it did not affect them. The K'iche', the largest Guatemalan indigenous group, were in favor of annexation as Mexico allowed the K'iche' to control their own affairs during the annexation process.

Manuel José Arce, a Salvadoran politician and a leading republican figure, was one of the primary opponents to annexation. Although some parts of El Salvador sought annexation, the capital city, San Salvador, firmly supported independence. On 4 October 1821, Pedro Barriere, the conservative political chief of El Salvador, arrested Arce and several other Salvadoran politicians for calling upon Barrier to hold elections to elect a delegation for the Consultive Junta. In response to Barriere's action and seeking to prevent civil unrest in San Salvador, Consultive Junta removed Barriere from his position on 11 October. The Consultive Junta replaced him with Salvadoran priest José Matías Delgado. Delgado proceeded to free the politicians who Barriere arrested. (Note: Although the Consultive Junta appointed Delgado as political chief of El Salvador on 11 October 1821, he actually assumed office on 28 November 1821.) Costa Rica maintained a neutral position regarding independence or annexation to Mexico due to its relative isolation from the rest of Central America and because it previously opposed the initial declaration of independence from Spain. The Costa Rican provisional government waited for a definitive decision from the Consultive Junta. Gaínza did not wish to hold a meeting of Central America's political leaders, fearing that disagreements from the meeting could contribute to the outbreak of a civil war within Central America.

"My object is only to manifest to you that the present interest of Mexico and Guatemala is so identical or indivisible that they cannot constitute themselves in separate or independent nations without risking the security of each..."

— Agustín de Iturbide, 28 November 1821

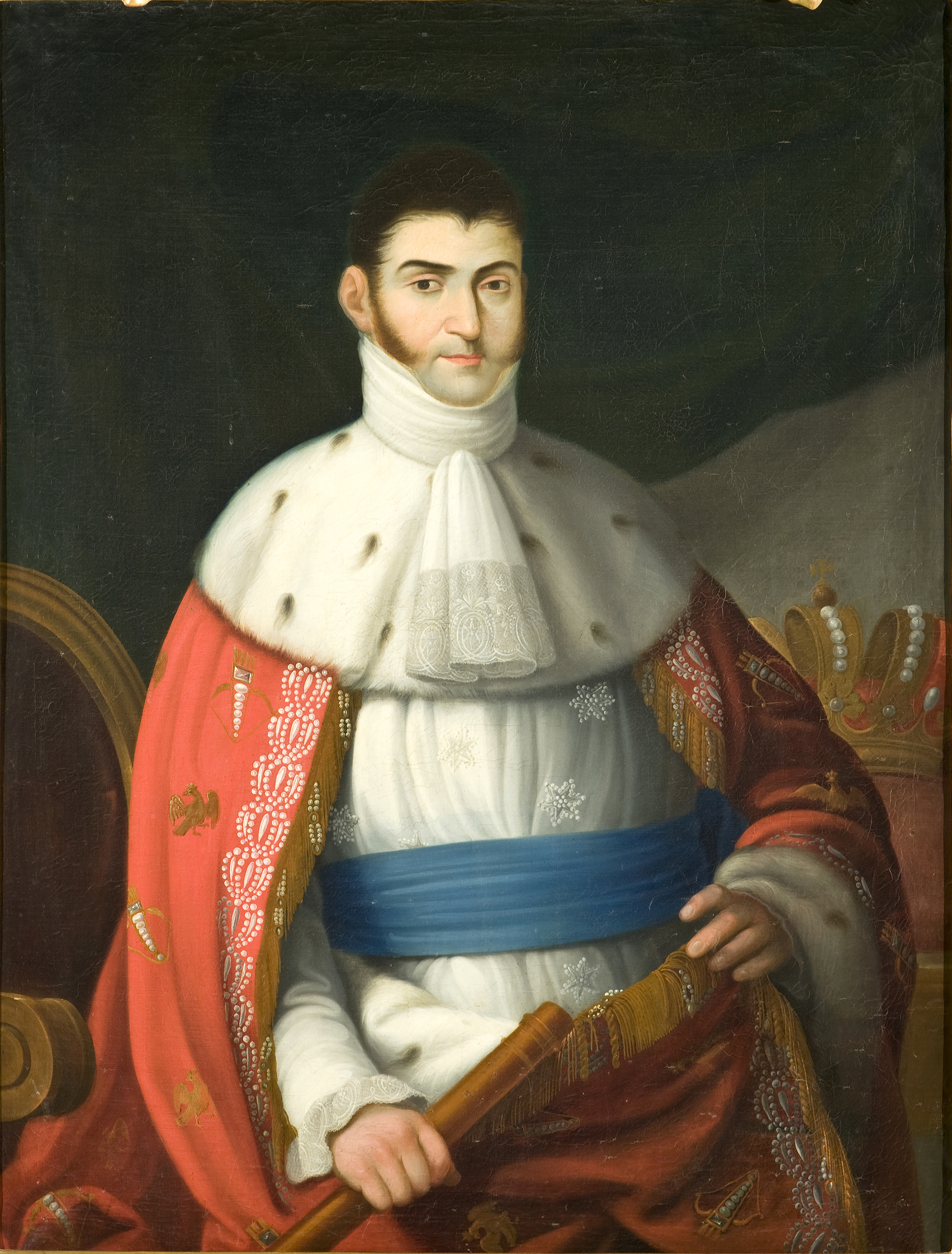
Agustín I, Emperor of Mexico

On 28 November 1821, Gaínza received a letter from Iturbide formally requesting the annexation of Central America into the Mexican Empire. In the letter, Iturbide stated that stability and security in Central America could only be possible if it joined a union with Mexico. He claimed to be seeking harmony with the Central American people, but he also stated that he was sending soldiers to Central America to ensure that order would be protected. Iturbide had already sent 200 soldiers into Chiapas on 20 November to seize control of the area; although, Chiapas had already declared its separation from Guatemala on 26 September.

In response to the letter, Gaínza ordered all 237 municipalities across Central America to publish Iturbide's letter, hold open cabildos (municipal councils where citizens could give their input on government decisions), and vote on annexation within thirty days.

Results of the open cabildos on annexation to the Mexican Empire
Choice	Votes (Note: Each singular vote represents the decision of an entire municipality's population, not the vote of single individuals.)	%
In favor of complete annexation	104	43.88
In favor of annexation with certain conditions	11	4.65
In favor of letting the Consultive Junta decide	32	13.50
In opposition of annexation until a new government is elected	21	8.86
In total opposition of annexation	2	0.84
Vote not counted	67	28.27

The result of the open cabildos was a decision in favor of complete annexation without any conditions. Although the issued final report of the poll did not wait for the results of the 67 remaining open cabildos to be counted and did not give exact details on how each municipality voted, Gaínza assured the public that the 104 municipalities which voted in favor of complete annexation without any conditions represented a majority of the population. As such, on 5 January 1822, the Consultive Junta voted in unconditional support for the annexation of Central America to the Mexican Empire. As a result of the annexation, Mexico reached the height of its territorial extent, and the people of Central America were automatically granted Mexican citizenship. The Consultive Junta was dissolved on 21 February 1822.

The Act of Union of the Provinces of Central America with the Mexican Empire, which formalized Central America's annexation to Mexico, was signed by fourteen politicians and religious leaders. The fourteen signatories were:

- Gabino Gaínza
- Mariano de Aycinena y Piñol
- Miguel Larreynaga
- José Cecilio del Valle
- Mariano Beltranena y Llano
- Manuel Antonio de Molina
- Antonio Rivera Cabezas
- José Mariano Calderón
- José Antonio Alvarado
- Ángel María Candina
- Eusebio Castillo
- José Valdés
- José Domingo Diéguez
- Mariano Gálvez

== Annexation and subsequent separatist conflicts ==
Brigadier Vicente Filísola was appointed by Iturbide to command Mexican soldiers to occupy Central America and solidify Mexican control in the region. The active resistance against the annexation was in Costa Rica, El Salvador, and Nicaragua. Republican politicians in El Salvador attempted to usurp authority of Central America from Guatemala City and lead a region-wide resistance to Mexican occupation.

=== Suppression of Salvadoran resistance ===
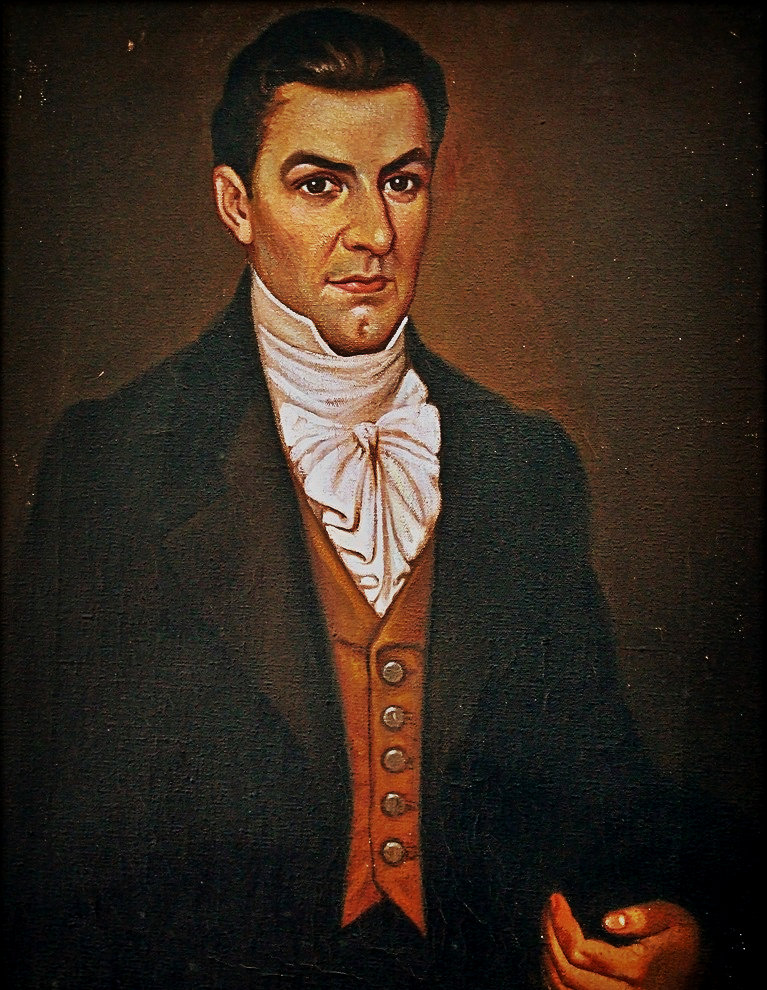
Painting of Manuel José Arce, who organized the Salvadoran resistance against Mexican imperial forces

Arce and Delgado organized an armed Salvadoran resistance and prepared to engage in battle with Mexican forces. Gaínza, who was serving as the captain general of Central America, committed Guatemalan soldiers to support the Mexicans in March 1822 and placed them under the command of Chilean Sergeant José Nicolás de Abós y Padilla. Salvadoran and Guatemalan forces clashed in the town of El Espinal on 3 March, ending in a Salvadoran victory which forced Abós y Padilla's soldiers to retreat. Gaínza discharged Abós y Padilla and replaced him with Colonel Manuel Arzú on 19 March. Gaínza also reinforced Arzú with more soldiers. Arzú's army succeeded in occupying San Salvador on 5 April and forced Salvadoran soldiers to abandon the city.

Filísola remained in Chiapas as Guatemalan forces occupied San Salvador. After requests from the Guatemalan government for his presence, Filísola arrived at Guatemala City on 12 June 1822. He succeeded Gaínza as the captain general and political chief of Central America on 23 June. On 30 August, Filísola negotiated an armistice with El Salvador which involved the Salvadoran government presenting its rights and complains before the Mexican government in November and ceding seven municipalities to the Guatemalan government. (Note: The seven municipalities ceded by El Salvador to Guatemala were Chalchuapa, Coatepeque, San Alejo, San Francisco Gotera, San Miguel, Santa Ana, and Usulután.) The delegations which negotiated the armistice included Antonio José Cañas and Juan Francisco Sosa from El Salvador, and Colonel Felipe Codallos and Lieutenant Colonel José Luis González Ojeda from Guatemala.

Filísola advised Iturbide (who had assumed the throne of the Mexican Empire on 19 May 1822) of the armistice. Iturbide rejected the armistice. He believed that the armistice was not enough to ensure the loyalty of El Salvador, and ordered Filísola to again occupy San Salvador and extract a total submission to Mexican authority from its government. On 10 November, the Salvadoran congress declared that it was not able to ratify the armistice, and that El Salvador would defend its rights with force. Before Filísola's forces invaded El Salvador, the Salvadoran government junta sent an envoy of diplomats to Washington, D.C. to formally request annexation to the United States in an attempt to avoid being completely conquered by Mexican forces. During this time, a rumor spread in El Salvador that the United States had sent an expeditionary force of 1,500 soldiers to enforce the annexation, but no such expedition existed. The envoy arrived in mid-1823, but they were not invited to meet either President James Monroe or Secretary of State John Quincy Adams. By then, the Mexican Empire had already collapsed.

Following Iturbide's orders, Filísola left Guatemala City on 11 November 1822 with 2,000 troops to again occupy San Salvador. In response to Filísola's invasion, Delgado sent a message to the Mexican government offering full annexation on the sole condition that representatives from El Salvador would be allowed to participate in the formulation of the new Mexican constitution. On 7 December, Filísola occupied the Salvadoran city of Coatepeque. The Mexican army numbered 5,000 soldiers while Salvadoran forces numbered less than 1,000 and were armed with only machetes and spears. Despite Filísola's numerical advantage, he recognized that attempting to subjugate the rebel army would be difficult as Delgado's symbolic religious support was boosting public morale in San Salvador. On 21 December, Filísola was informed that Arce's soldiers had fortified themselves in the cities of San Miguel, San Martín, and Cojutepeque. Filísola issued an ultimatum to Arce on 14 January 1823, stating that annexation to the United States was hopeless and that annexation to the Mexican Empire was inevitable. Arce sent Filísola a response the following day rejecting the ultimatum.

After the rejection, Mexican forces marched on Apopa and Ayutuxtepeque on 7 February 1823, all the while being attacked by Salvadoran soldiers using guerrilla tactics. The Salvadoran soldiers defending San Salvador fled the city that same day. Two days later, Filísola captured San Salvador and became the province's governor. The Salvadoran soldiers who fled the city retreated to Honduras under the command of Mariano Prado, where they surrendered to Filísola near the town of Gualcince on 21 February.

=== Civil war in Costa Rica ===
The Electoral Junta was established in Costa Rica on 5 January 1822, abolishing the Interim Junta which had governed Costa Rica since December 1821. On 10 January, the Electoral Junta approved Costa Rica's annexation to the Mexican Empire. The Electoral Junta was succeeded by the Superior Gubernatorial Junta on 13 January, and its president, Rafael Barroeta y Castilla (who had been appointed by the junta upon its formation), began preparations for elections which would determine Costa Rica's representatives in the Mexican Constituent Congress. The election was held on 31 January. Barroeta served as the junta's president until 13 April when he was replaced by Santiago de Bonilla y Laya-Bolívar. Bonilla was succeeded by José María de Peralta on 14 July, who himself was succeeded by José Rafael Gallegos on 16 October.

When Iturbide abolished the Constituent Congress on 31 October 1822 without a new constitution being drafted, some Costa Ricans became frustrated with the Mexican emperor. The frustrations divided Costa Rican politicians on whether to remain with Mexico or to secede. On 8 March 1823, the Superior Gubernatorial Junta voted to secede from Mexico, declaring: "The Province of Costa Rica shall be absolutely free and independent of any power, therefore in the use of its rights and the current congress in the exercise of its sovereignty." The declaration of independence was not universally agreed upon by all Costa Rican politicians, leading to a civil conflict among the Costa Rican ruling class between those in favor of independence (republicans) and those in favor of remaining with Mexico (monarchists).

On 14 March 1823, the Superior Gubernatorial Junta led by José Santos Lombardo y Alvarado (who had succeeded Gallegos on 1 January 1823) was dissolved in favor of the Provincial Deputation led by Rafael Francisco Osejo. Osejo and the new government, however, were overthrown in a coup d'état by monarchist Joaquín de Oreamuno on 29 March. Republican Gregorio José Ramírez was declared as the leader of Costa Rica in opposition of Oreamuno in the city of Alajuela on 1 April.

Ramírez led republican forces in battle against the monarchists on 5 April 1823 in the Battle of Ochomogo. The battle ended in a republican victory and the overthrow of Oreamuno. Afterwards, Ramírez assumed the position of supreme leader of Costa Rica. Ramírez was succeeded by José María de Peralta on 16 April, who was then succeeded by a second Superior Gubernatorial Junta led by Manuel Alvarado e Hidalgo on 10 May, which remained in power until September 1824.

=== Unrest in Nicaragua ===
José Anacleto Ordóñez, a Nicaraguan soldier, merchant, and nationalist who opposed Mexican rule over Nicaragua, launched a rebellion against the pro-Mexican government on 16 January 1823. He and his supporters bloodlessly captured the military barracks in Granada. This was followed by a series of lootings and robberies by Ordóñez's supporters in the cities of Granada, Jinotepe, Juigalpa, and Masaya. The violence caused many in the affected cities to flee to Managua, which remained under the control of pro-Mexican forces.

On 23 February 1823, Nicaraguan governor Miguel González Saravia y Colarte (who had been Nicaragua's final Spanish governor) forcibly recaptured Granada with an army of 1,000 soldiers, forcing Ordóñez and his supporters to flee the city. Ordóñez bestowed upon himself the title of caudillo and retreated to Masaya, where he continued his rebellion. On 17 April, González Saravia stepped down as the governor of Nicaragua and was replaced by José Carmen Salazar. Five days later, Ordóñez's rebel forces captured Crisanto Sacasa, the pro-Mexican commander of Granada, and held him as a prisoner of war. Salazar attempted to make peace with Ordóñez's rebellion, but Ordoñez's rebellion continued well past the independence of Central America, resulting in Ordóñez overthrowing the government of Pablo Méndez in August 1824.

== Independence from Mexico ==
=== Iturbide's abdication ===
After the subjugation of El Salvador, Filísola planned to continue his campaign for Mexican control of Central America, including subjugating the rebellious city of Granada and solidifying control of Costa Rica. Before he could continue, however, he heard news about a military-led plot to depose Iturbide. Filísola returned to Guatemala City in March 1823, abandoning his orders to complete the annexation of Central America.

As a result of the plot against him, Iturbide abdicated the Mexican throne and went into exile on 19 March 1823, marking the end of the Mexican Empire. In its place, three Mexican military officers—Nicolás Bravo, Guadalupe Victoria, and Pedro Negrete—established the Supreme Executive Power, serving as joint heads of state of a provisional government formed in the wake of the abolition of the Mexican monarchy. On 29 March, after news of Iturbide's abdication reached Filísola, he called for the formation of a Central American congress to decide the future of Central America. On 1 April, the Mexican Constituent Congress (which had been restored on 7 February 1823) instructed Mexican forces in Central America to cease hostilities with anti-annexation and republican forces, and Filísola expressed his support for the Central American people to determine their own "destiny".

On 7 May 1823, Filísola appointed Codallos, who was his second-in-command during the campaign to annex El Salvador, as the military chief of San Salvador in his absence. Less than one month later on 25 May, Salvadorans managed to pressure Codallos and the garrison of 500 Mexican and Guatemalan soldiers under his command to leave San Salvador. In his place, Salvadoran politicians and military leaders established another Consultive Junta, based in San Salvador. The junta was composed of Prado, Colonel José Justo Milla, and Colonel José Rivas. The junta was later dissolved on 17 June and Prado assumed sole governance of El Salvador.

=== Central American congress ===
On 18 June 1823, the Mexican Constituent Congress instructed Filísola to be in attendance of the upcoming session of the Central American congress and to maintain friendly relations in the hope that the congress would vote to remain a part of Mexico. The Mexican congress did instruct him, however, to respect the Central American congress' decision whether to remain in union with Mexico or to become an independent state.

The session of the Central American congress began on 29 June 1823 with representatives from El Salvador, Guatemala, and Mexico in attendance. Chiapas, Costa Rica, Honduras, and Nicaragua stated that they would boycott the conference until Filísola resigned as captain general and withdrew all Mexican forces from Central America. During the congress, 37 of the 41 representatives voted to appoint Delgado as the president of the congress, then known as the National Constituent Assembly of Central America. On 1 July, the National Constituent Assembly of Central America issued the Decree of Absolute Independence of the Provinces of Central America, declaring independence from Mexico and reaffirming independence from Spain. The declaration formed the United Provinces of Central America. Chiapas, however, did not join the newly declared Central American state, choosing to remain a part of Mexico. Its decision to remain with Mexico was confirmed in a referendum on 26 May 1824.

After the residents of Guatemala City raised enough money to pay for the Mexican army's withdrawal, Filísola and his soldiers withdrew from Guatemala and returned to Chiapas on 3 August 1823. Central American independence was formally recognized by Mexico on 20 August 1824. The United Provinces of Central America, later known as the Federal Republic of Central America, continued to exist until its 1841 collapse following the First and Second Central American Civil Wars.

Central America's independence led many Mexican provinces to desire increased regional autonomy for themselves. Most provinces called upon the national government to establish a new national congress as they believed those under Iturbide were illegitimate. Meanwhile, the provinces of Oaxaca, Yucatán, and Zacatecas announced the establishments of their own local juntas in place of a national congress, and San Luis Potosí and the Eastern Interior Provinces (Note: The Eastern Interior Provinces consisted of Coahuila, Nuevo León, Nuevo Santander, and Texas.) stated that they would declare independence from Mexico unless a new congress was established. The situation in Mexico stabilized after the Mexican Constituent Congress ratified a new constitution in October 1824 and the country became a federal republic.

== Government ==
=== Captaincy government ===
The First Mexican Empire at its territorial peak (1822–1823)

During Mexico's annexation of the region, Mexico and Central America had the same heads of state. Iturbide ruled as regent, and then as emperor, from January 1822 until his abdication in March 1823, after which, the three leaders of the provisional government—Bravo, Victoria, and Negrete—served as joint heads of state.

At the regional level, the five provinces were organized into the Captaincy General of Guatemala (Spanish: Capitanía General de Guatemala), and the captaincy general was governed by a captain general from the capital in Guatemala City. The position of captain general existed throughout Mexico's rule, and it was held by Gaínza, Filísola, and Codallos.

Color key
Monarchist/Annexationist

Captain General			Assumed office	Left office	Time in office
1	Gabino Gaínza	Gabino Gaínza (1753–1829)	5 January 1822	23 June 1822	169 days
2	Vicente Filísola	Vicente Filísola (1785–1850)	23 June 1822	26 November 1822	156 days
3	Felipe Codallos	Felipe Codallos (1790–1849)	26 November 1822	7 March 1823	101 days
4	Vicente Filísola	Vicente Filísola (1785–1850)	7 March 1823	1 July 1823	116 days

=== Individual provincial governments ===
The following are lists of the political leaders of the five individual provinces. Control of the provinces changed multiple times between monarchists in favor of annexation and republicans in favor of secession, usually as a result of conflicts and unrest within the provinces.

Color key
Monarchist/Annexationist
Republican/Secessionist

==== Costa Rica ====
Political chief		Assumed office	Left office	Time in office	Ref.
1	Rafael Barroeta y Castilla	5 January 1822	13 April 1822	98 days	
2	Santiago de Bonilla y Laya-Bolívar	13 April 1822	14 June 1822	62 days	
3	José María de Peralta y la Vega	14 June 1822	15 October 1822	124 days	
4	José Rafael Gallegos	17 October 1822	31 December 1822	76 days	
5	José Santos Lombardo y Alvarado	1 January 1823	14 March 1823	72 days	
6	Rafael Francisco Osejo	14 March 1823	29 March 1823	15 days	
7	Joaquín de Oreamuno	29 March 1823	5 April 1823	7 days	
8	Gregorio José Ramírez	5 April 1823	16 April 1823	11 days	
9	José María de Peralta y La Vega	16 April 1823	10 May 1823	24 days	
10	Manuel Alvarado e Hidalgo	10 May 1823	1 July 1823	52 days	

==== El Salvador ====
Political chief		Assumed office	Left office	Time in office	Ref.
1	José Matías Delgado	5 January 1822	9 February 1823	1 year and 35 days	
2	Vicente Filísola	9 February 1823	7 May 1823	87 days	
3	Felipe Codallos	7 May 1823	25 May 1823	18 days	
4	Consultive Junta	25 May 1823	17 June 1823	23 days	
5	Mariano Prado	17 June 1823	1 July 1823	14 days	

==== Guatemala ====
Political chief		Assumed office	Left office	Time in office	Ref.
1	Gabino Gaínza	5 January 1822	23 June 1822	169 days	
2	Vicente Filísola	23 June 1822	1 July 1823	1 year and 8 days	

==== Honduras ====
Political chief		Assumed office	Left office	Time in office	Ref.
1	Juan Lindo y Zelaya	5 January 1822	1 July 1823	1 year and 177 days	

==== Nicaragua ====
Political chief		Assumed office	Left office	Time in office	Ref.
1	Miguel González Saravia y Colarte	5 January 1822	17 April 1823	1 year and 102 days	
2	José Carmen Salazar	17 April 1823	6 May 1823	19 days	
3	Pablo Méndez	6 May 1823	1 July 1823	56 days	

=== Representation in the national legislature ===
The Mexican Constituent Congress was established on 24 February 1822 and was tasked with drafting a constitution for the Mexican Empire. In November 1821, the Mexican government decided on the electoral procedures to select representatives for the Constituent Congress, which it decided would consist of 162 members. After Central America joined the empire, Iturbide wanted to extend congressional representation to the region. Due to unavailable demographic data at the time, Iturbide reluctantly allowed Central America to have 40 representatives in the Constituent Congress, which he thought was a "prudent" amount. Despite being allowed to have 40 representatives, only 38 were elected.

The following is a list of Central America's representatives in the Constituent Congress:

Chiapas: 7

- José Anselmo Lara
- Pedro Celís
- Bonifacio Fernández de Córdova
- Luciano Figueroa
- Juan María Lazaga
- Manuel de Mier y Terán
- Marcial Zebadúa

Costa Rica: 2

- José Antonio Alvarado
- José Francisco de Peralta

El Salvador: 0 (Note: El Salvador was entitled to elect 6 representatives, but none attended the Constituent Assembly due to being in armed rebellion against Mexican annexation. Juan de Dios Mayorga, a representative of Guatemala, diplomatically represented El Salvador in the Constituent Assembly.)

Guatemala: 15

- Mariano de Aycinena y Piñol
- José Antonio Acayaga
- Pedro Arrollave
- Tomás Beltranena
- Juan de Dios Mayorga
- Cirilo Flores Estrada
- José Ignacio Grijalva
- Mariano Larrabe
- Antonio de Larrazábal y Arrivillaga
- Miguel Larreynaga
- Pedro Molina Mazariegos
- Isidoro Montúfar
- José Vicente Orantes
- Antonio Rivera Cabezas
- Joaquín Yúdice

Honduras: 10

- Cayetano Bosque
- Manuel Gutiérrez
- Próspero de Herrera
- Joaquín Lindo
- Juan Lindo
- Francisco Antonio Márquez
- José Santiago Milla
- Jacinto Rubí
- José Gregorio Tinoco de Contreras
- José Cecilio del Valle (Note: José Cecilio del Valle was elected from both Chiquimula, Guatemala, and Tegucigalpa, Honduras. Since he was not a resident of Chiquimula, del Valle was considered to be a Honduran representative.)

Nicaragua: 4

- Víctor de la Guardia y Ayala
- Joaquín Herdosia
- Manuel López de la Plata
- Juan José Quiñones

Iturbide abolished the Constituent Congress on 31 October 1822 before a constitution was approved, and replaced it with the National Institutional Junta. Of the 55-member legislature, 13 were from Central America. The Central American representatives in the National Institutional Junta were Arrollave, Beltranena, Celís, de la Plata, Fernández de Córdova, Figueroa, Gutiérrez, Larreynaga, Montúfar, Orantes, Peralta, Quiñones, and Rubí. The National Institutional Junta was abolished on 29 March 1823, five months after it formed and shortly after Iturbide abdicated.

=== Territorial organization ===
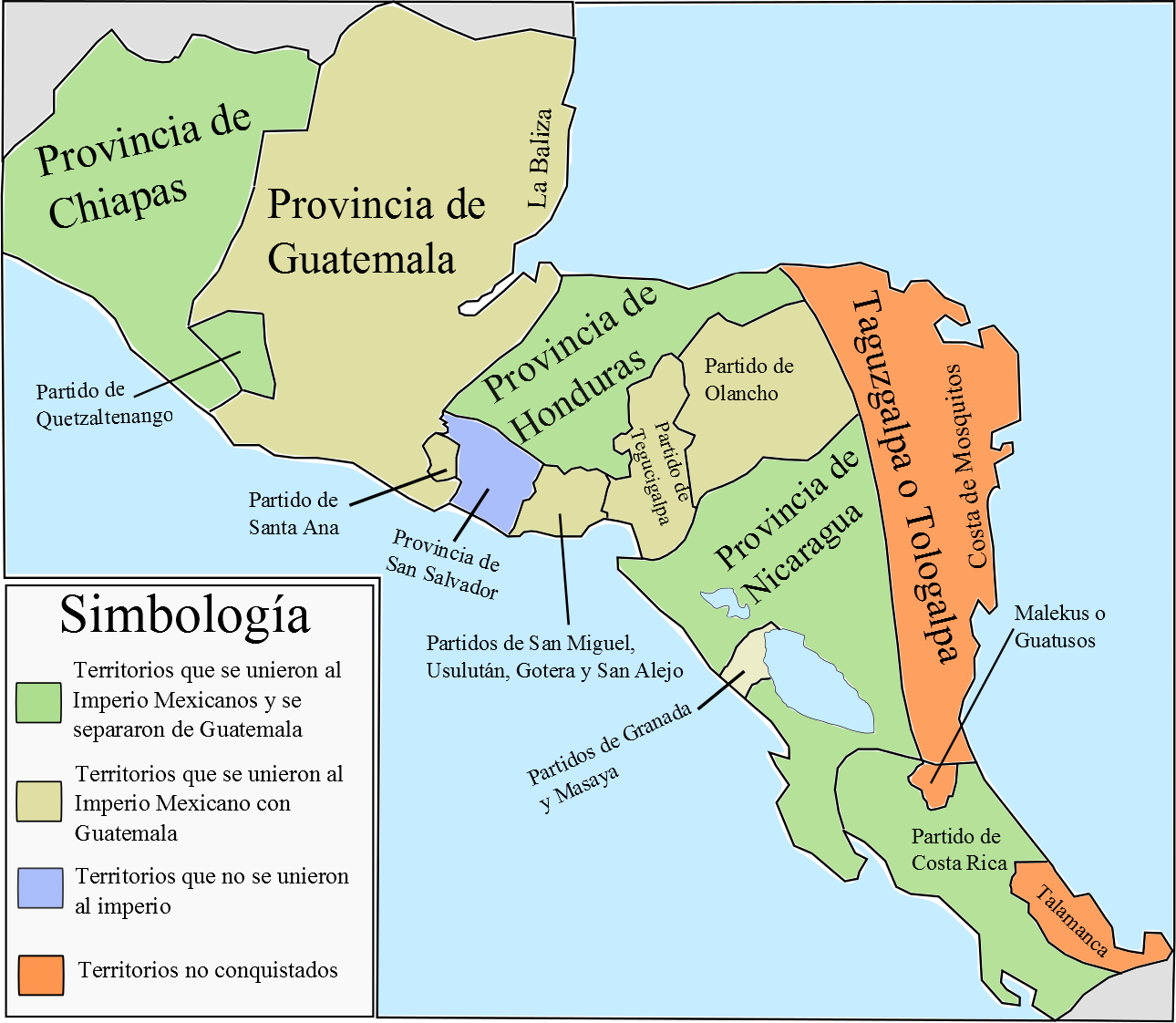
The Captaincy General of Guatemala at the time of its union with the Mexican Empire in 1822

- Guatemala
- San Salvador
- Honduras
- Nicaragua
- Costa Rica

On 18 January, Iturbide decided that the territories that had separated from Guatemala to join the empire (the district of Quetzaltenango and the provinces of Chiapas; Honduras, except for the districts of Tegucigalpa and Olancho; Nicaragua, except for Granada and Masaya; and Costa Rica) would become part of the Captaincy General of Puebla, which at that time was led by Domingo Luaces; while the rest would continue to be part of the Captaincy General of Guatemala.

On 4 November, Iturbide divided the former captaincy general into three commandancies: Chiapas (which also included the eastern part of the Province of Guatemala and the districts of Tabasco and Chontalpa), Suchitepéquez (with the rest of the Province of Guatemala, the Province of San Salvador, the port of Omoa, and with its capital in New Guatemala), and León (the remainder of what had been the Guatemalan captaincy general); these divisions ultimately had no effect due to the fall of the empire.

== Economy ==
For Mexico, the annexation of Central America was seen as a way to help stabilize the country's struggling economy, especially the mining and agricultural industries, after a decade of fighting against Spanish rule. Central America's annexation offered the Mexican government a larger tax base, which would help the country rebuild its infrastructure. Additionally, leaders in Central America saw annexation as a way to help its own economy by allowing diversification and opening trade to Mexico and potentially Europe.

Upon gaining independence from Spain in September 1821, the Central American government owed 3,138,451 pesos (equivalent to $84,345,871 in 2025) of foreign debt; by October 1823, after the end of the period of Mexican rule, the debt increased to 3,583,576 pesos (equivalent to $96,308,605 in 2025). Further economic difficulties included a decline in indigo production which predated independence, the decline of textile production to a "state of extreme [decline]" due to competing English cotton goods, and the government's failure to collect 385,693 pesos (equivalent to $10,365,499 in 2025) in taxes from the provinces. In an attempt to alleviate its debt and economic troubles, the captaincy general passed a tariff law in 1822 which placed taxes on various exports from Central America and made the exporting of coins illegal. That same year, Gaínza issued 40,000 pesos (equivalent to $1,075,000 in 2025) in the form of banknotes, which was the first use of paper money in Central America. The Central American federal government eventually defaulted on its debt in the mid-1820s.

Sometime between 1823 and 1825, a congressional commission by the government of the Federal Republic of Central America began an investigation into why the mint in Guatemala City had been "reduced" to the "condition of insignificance" it was in. Initially, the commission believed that the mint was "despoiled" between 1822 and 1823 by Gaínza and Filísola, who supposedly used the mint to directly fund their military operations in the annexation of El Salvador. Additionally, the residents of Guatemala City were forced to raise enough money to pay for the Mexican army's withdrawal from Central America in August 1823. Eventually, the commission's initial belief was proven incorrect, as it later found that the reason the mint had been producing less money was that the mint failed to make loans to miners.

To celebrate the incorporation of Central America into the Mexican Empire, Iturbide authorized the minting of proclamation medals in gold, silver, and bronze; however, the medals did not have any monetary value. Four types of medals were struck for Central America dating to late-1822 for Chiapas, Quetzaltenango, Guatemala, and León; the location of where the medals were minted is unknown.

Although Mariano de Aycinena y Piñol made a proposal to abolish slavery in 1821, slavery remained legal in Central America while it was ruled by Mexico. Slavery was not made illegal until 24 April 1824 by an executive decree and Central America's later adoption of its constitution, however, prior to then, many slaves had already been freed by their owners.

== See also ==
- History of Central America
- Relations of Mexico with Central America
  - Costa Rica–Mexico relations
  - El Salvador–Mexico relations
  - Guatemala–Mexico relations
  - Honduras–Mexico relations
  - Nicaragua–Mexico relations
