= Miguel de Bonilla y Laya-Bolívar =

Costa Rican priest and politician (1763–1826)

Miguel de Bonilla y Laya-Bolívar (1763–1826) was a Costa Rican Roman Catholic priest and politician. He was one of the signatories of the Costa Rican Declaration of Independence.

Bonilla was baptized in Cartago, Costa Rica on September 30, 1763. His parents were Sergeant Major Andrés de Bonilla y Sáenz and María Gertrudis de Laya-Bolívar y Miranda. José Santiago de Bonilla y Laya-Bolívar, president of Costa Rica's governing junta in 1822, was his brother.

Bonilla was ordained as a priest in Guatemala. He was in charge of several parishes in Costa Rica and was the proprietor of valuable ranching property. He was called by the nickname Padre Tiricia (Father Jaundice), apparently because he suffered from the disease.

The ayuntamientos of the town of Bagaces, the city of Esparza, and several indigenous peoples designated Bonilla in October 1821 as their representative in the Junta de Legados de los Ayuntamientos that met in Cartago on October 25–26, 1821 to discuss Costa Rica's independence from Spain. On October 29, 1821, he attended the session of the ayuntamiento of Cartago en which the Costa Rican Declaration of Independence was ratified.

He was one of the members of the Costa Rican republican party during the era of independence. One of the supporters of the empire, the Catalan Juan Freses de Ñeco, son-in-law of the royalist military commander Joaquín de Oreamuno y Muñoz de la Trinidad, shouted, "Padre Tiricia returns, because we will kill him!" (¡Ese padre Tiricia que se vuelva, porque lo matamos!), and immediately shot him with a bullet that pierced his cassock. Bonilla walked to Alajuela with Rafael Francisco Osejo, president of the toppled government, and there they convinced Gregorio José Ramírez y Castro to command the republican forces, who defeated the royalists in the Battle of Ochomogo the following April 5.

Bonilla died in Cartago, Costa Rica, in August 1826.
