= Consultive Junta =

Consultive Junta (Spanish: Junta Consultiva) may refer to:

- Consultive Junta (Guatemala) of Guatemala (1821–1822), see Central America under Mexican rule
- Consultive Junta (El Salvador) of El Salvador (1823)
