= List of wars involving Costa Rica =

This is a list of wars involving the Republic of Costa Rica.

Costa Rican military victory
Costa Rican military defeat
Indecisive or unclear outcome
Ongoing conflict

Conflict	Combatant 1	Combatant 2	Results
Ochomogo War (1823)	Republicans: San José; Alajuela	Imperialists: Cartago; Heredia	Republican victory
Zamora's Conspiracy (1826)	Costa Rica	Royalist conspirators	Victory: Decisive victory of the Republican government.; Execution of José Zamora and defeat of the counter-revolution.
League War (1835)	San José	Alajuela; Cartago; Heredia	Josefine victory: San Jose is later made Costa Rica's Capital.
Invasion of Guanacaste (1836)	Costa Rica	Nicaragua; Costa Ricans exiled	Victory
Alajuela Uprising (1842)	Army of the United Towns; San José; Alajuela; Heredia; Cartago (from Sept. 13)	Protective Allied Army of the Law; Cartago	Victory of the United Towns: Overthrow and execution of Francisco Morazán.; Antonio Pinto Soares assumes temporary leadership.
Filibuster War (1855–1857)	Allied Central American Army; Nicaragua; Costa Rica; El Salvador; Guatemala; Honduras; Legitimist Party	Filibusters; Walker's Nicaragua; Democratic Party	Central American alliance victory
Battle of La Angostura (1860)	Costa Rica	Morist Rebels	Government victory: Defeat of the Morist attempt to regain power.; Execution of Juan Rafael Mora
Federico Mora's Expedition (1878)	Costa Rica	Morist Rebel Forces (Nicaragua) Nicaraguan Deserters; Supported by: Guatemala	Government victory: Defeat of the rebel incursion in the Atlantic region.
Barrios' War of Reunification (1885)	El Salvador; Mexico; Costa Rica; Nicaragua	Guatemala; Honduras	Anti-Barrios victory: Failure to reunify Central America; Death of Justo Rufino Barrios
World War I (1918)	Allied Powers: France; United Kingdom; and Empire: Australia; Canada; Ceylon; Egypt; Newfoundland; New Zealand; India; South Africa; Russia (until 1917); Italy (from 1915); United States (from 1917); Japan; Costa Rica; and others ...	Central Powers: Germany; Austria-Hungary; Ottoman Empire; Bulgaria (from 1915); and others ...	Allied Powers victory
Sapoá Revolution (1919)	Government of Costa Rica	Costa Rican Rebels (Nicaragua) Nicaraguan Volunteers	Government victory: Failure of the rebel incursion.; The dictatorship falls months later due to internal pressure.
Coto War (1921)	Costa Rica	Panama	Victory: Panama ceded Coto to Costa Rica
World War II (1941–1945)	United States; Soviet Union; United Kingdom; China; France; Poland; Canada; Australia; New Zealand; India; South Africa; Yugoslavia; Greece; Denmark; Norway; Netherlands; Belgium; Luxembourg; Czechoslovakia; Brazil; Mexico; Panama; Costa Rica; El Salvador; Guatemala; Honduras; Nicaragua; Dominican Republic; Cuba	Germany; Japan; Italy; Hungary; Romania; Bulgaria; Croatia; Slovak Republic (1939–1945); Thailand; Manchukuo; Mengjiang	Victory
Costa Rican Civil War (1948)	Government of Costa Rica; Calderon forces People's Vanguard Party; Nicaraguan National Guard	National Liberation Army; Ulatista Forces; Caribbean Legion; Supported by: Guatemala; United States	Rebel victory: Overthrow of president Teodoro Picado Michalski; Costa Rican military abolished
Calderonista invasion of Costa Rica (1955)	Costa Rica; Supported by: United States Organization of American States	Calderón forces Supported by: Nicaragua; Venezuela; Dominican Republic	Costa Rican government victory
Dominican Civil War (1965)	Loyalist faction United States IAPF: Brazil; Paraguay; Nicaragua; Costa Rica; El Salvador; Honduras	Constitutionalist faction	Loyalist victory
