= Ochomogo =

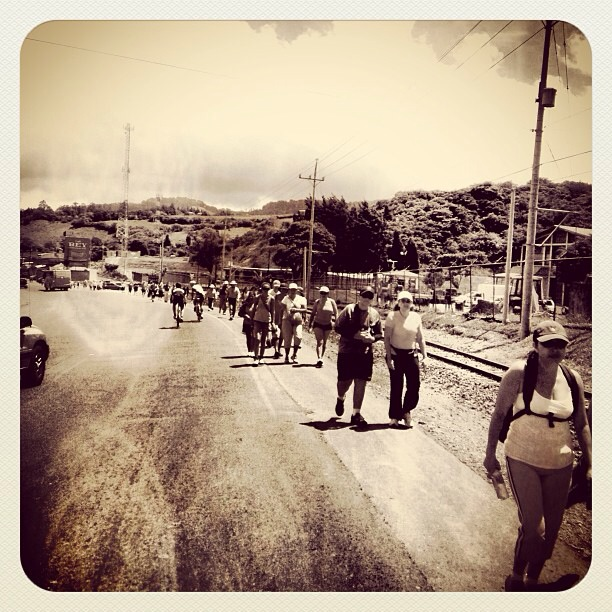
- Alto de Ochmogo. People walking on 1 August to the Cathedral of Cartago in honoour of the Virgin of the Angels.

- Location within Costa Rica
- Coordinates: 9.89797°N 83.94433°W
- Country: Costa Rica
- Province: Cartago
- Canton: Cartago
- District: San Nicolás

Ochomogo is a location in the province of Cartago, Costa Rica. It is in a mountain pass between the cities of San José and Cartago. It was the site of the Battle of Ochomogo (5 April 1823) between those who wanted Costa Rica to join the newly formed First Mexican Empire and those who preferred independence.

== Name ==
The name "Ochomogo" comes from the Chorotega language, and means "the first man". He was a companion of the god Cipactonal, one of the creators of the Aztec calendar.

== Location ==
Ochomogo is in San Nicolás, Cartago, Provincia de Cartago, Costa Rica. Ochomogo is just south of the Autopista Florencio del Castillo, which connects San José to Cartago, and is on the northeastern outskirts of Cartago. The Köppen climate classification is Cfb : Temperate oceanic climate.

The left-lateral strike-slip Ochomogo fault is about 22 kilometres (14 mi) long, running between the south of San José and the southern slopes of the Irazú Volcano. The slip rate is no less than 0.5 millimetres (0.020 in) per year, and no more than 1.1–3.3 millimetres (0.043–0.130 in) per year. At one time there was a plaque in Ochomogo that said "Continental division of waters". This could mean that the location was at the center of America, but more plausibly meant that it was on the drainage divide between the Atlantic (Cartago) and Pacific (San José) slopes.

== History ==
The Ochomogo War in 1823 was won by the Republicans, and caused the capital of Costa Rica to be transferred from Cartago to San José. During the League War in 1835 there was another confrontation in Alto de Ochomogo where the people of Alajuela, Heredia and Cartago fought the people of San José, who were again victorious. A railway was built through the Ochomogo Pass in the 1870s to link Cartago to San José.

In 1948 the Ochomogo Pact (Pacto Ochomogo) resulted from a conversation in Ochomogo between José Figueres Ferrer, leader of the National Liberation Army, and Manuel Mora, leader of the Communist Party. They agreed to avoid a clash in San José between the conflicting forces, which would have led to a bloodbath. This resulted in the end of the Costa Rican Civil War.

In the night of 9–10 December 1963 torrential rain on the Irazú Volcano caused the Reventado River to widen to over 500 metres (1,600 ft), carrying a heavy load of rocks and mud. The flood destroyed buildings, roads and cemeteries, including 400 homes, and over 15 people died. Many of the inhabitants moved up to Alto de Ochomogo.

== Sources ==
- Chisholm, Hugh, ed. (1911). "Costa Rica" . Encyclopædia Britannica. Vol. 7 (11th ed.). Cambridge University Press. p. 220.
- Fernández, Karen (17 May 2020), "Is Ochomogo the center of America?", La Teja
- Montero, Walter; Rojas, Wilfredo; Linkimer, Lepolt (2013), "Neotectonics of the Ochomogo and Capellades faults and its relation with the Aguacaliente fault system, southern slopes of the Irazú-Turrialba massif, Costa Rica", Rev. Geol. Amér. Central (48): 119–139, ISSN 0256-7024
- "Node: Ochomogo (2012658414)", OpenStreetMap
- Ochomogo Pact (1980), Ministry of Culture and Youth (Costa Rica)
- "Ochomogo, San Nicolás, Cartago, Provincia de Cartago, Costa Rica", mindat.org
