= Honduras–Mexico relations =

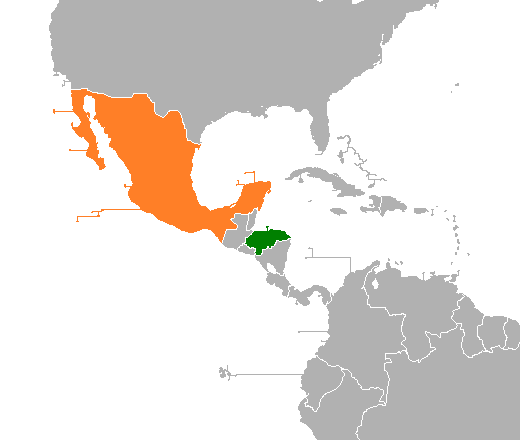

- Honduras: Mexico

The nations of Honduras and Mexico established diplomatic relations in 1879. Both nations are members of the Association of Caribbean States, Community of Latin American and Caribbean States, Organization of American States, Organization of Ibero-American States and the United Nations.

== History ==
Honduras and Mexico have always had a close relationship and also share a history and several socio-cultural traits in common. Both nations have national heritages of Mesoamerican cultures such as the Maya, both were conquered by the same conquerors such as Hernán Cortes, Cristóbal de Olid, and Pedro de Alvarado and subsequently belonged to the Spanish Empire, both are mostly Catholic, and both nations were part of the Viceroyalty of New Spain from 1535 to 1821. Shortly after achieving Independence from Spain in 1821, Honduras was a part of the First Mexican Empire for a very short time until 1823 when it then joined the Federal Republic of Central America. Among the Mexicans who joined the Army Allied Protector of the Law, commanded by the Honduran Francisco Morazán during the so-called Central American Civil Wars, were General Agustín Guzmán, a native of Quetzaltenango and many others. After its dissolution in 1838, Honduras became an independent nation.

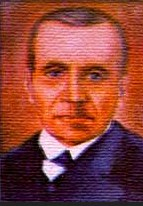
President Francisco Cruz Castro was the son of Don José María Cruz, a Mexican immigrant in Honduras.

Honduras and Mexico established formal diplomatic relations in 1879. In 1908, both nations established resident diplomatic missions in each other's capitals, respectively. That same year, a treaty of 'Friendship, Commerce and Navigation' was signed between both nations. In 1943, their diplomatic missions were elevated to embassies.

Mexico has actively observed and become involved in Honduran affairs throughout the country's early turbulent history which involved coup d'état, military rule, US intervention and wars with neighboring countries. In 1969, Honduras went to war with El Salvador known as the Football War for which Mexico intervened diplomatically and tried to resolve between the two countries. In June 2009, Honduran President Manuel Zelaya was ousted in a coup d'état and taken to neighboring Costa Rica. Like several other Latin American nations, Mexico temporarily severed diplomatic relations with Honduras. In July 2010, full diplomatic relations were once again re-established.

For several decades, Mexico has been a transit country for thousands of Honduran migrants who enter the country on their way to the United States. Many Honduran migrants flee to the United States for better economic opportunities and/or to escape rampant crime and gang violence in their country, especially from the MS-13/Mara Salvatrucha. In 2014, Mexico deported over 33,000 Honduran migrants back to Honduras.

Both the governments of Honduras and Mexico have increased mutual cooperation to provide legal and humanitarian assistance to Honduran migrants in Mexico and to combat human trafficking and violence against migrants in Mexico. Both nations have also agreed to combat the presence of Mexican cartels operating in Honduras.

In 2018, several hundreds to a few thousands Hondurans formed part of the Central American migrant caravans and traversed all of Mexico to the northern city of Tijuana to request asylum in the United States. That same year, over 640 Hondurans requested and obtained asylum in Mexico where many are choosing to remain rather than face the uncertainty of trying to request asylum in the US and also not wishing to be denied and deported back to Honduras. In 2023, the number of Hondurans requesting asylum in Mexico increased to 40,142.

In January 2022, Mexican Foreign Minister Marcelo Ebrard paid a visit to Honduras to attend the inauguration of President Xiomara Castro. In May 2022, Mexican President Andrés Manuel López Obrador paid an official visit to Honduras.

In October 2023, Honduran President Xiomara Castro paid a visit to Palenque, Chiapas to attend a Summit on Migration, hosted by Mexican President Andrés Manuel López Obrador. In October 2024, President Xiomara Castro travelled to Mexico to attend the inauguration of President Claudia Sheinbaum. In April 2025, President Sheinbaum paid a visit to Honduras to attend the IX CELAC summit.

== High-level visits ==
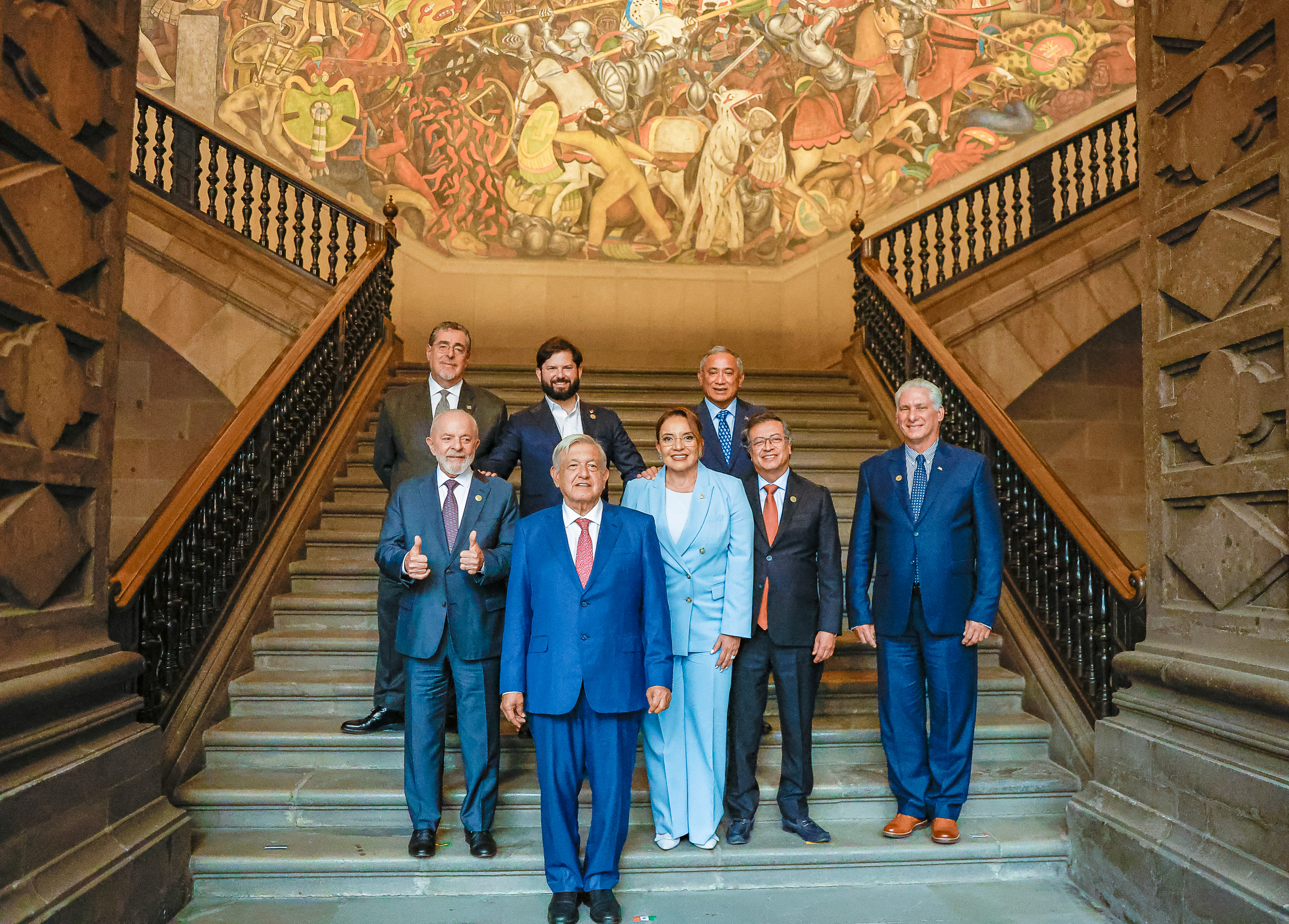
Honduran President Xiomara Castro along with Mexican President Andrés Manuel López Obrador (and other leaders) in Mexico City; September 2024.

Presidential visits from Honduras to Mexico

- President Oswaldo López Arellano (1965)
- President José Azcona del Hoyo (1988)
- President Rafael Leonardo Callejas Romero (1991, 1992)
- President Carlos Roberto Flores (1998)
- President Ricardo Maduro (2002, 2004)
- President Manuel Zelaya (2008, 2009)
- President Porfirio Lobo Sosa (2011, 2012)
- President Juan Orlando Hernández (2014, 2015, 2016, 2018, 2019, 2021)
- President Xiomara Castro (2023, 2024, 2025)

Presidential visits from Mexico to Honduras

- President Carlos Salinas de Gortari (1990)
- President Vicente Fox (2004, 2006)
- President Felipe Calderón (2008)
- President Enrique Peña Nieto (2015)
- President Andrés Manuel López Obrador (2022)
- President Claudia Sheinbaum (2025)

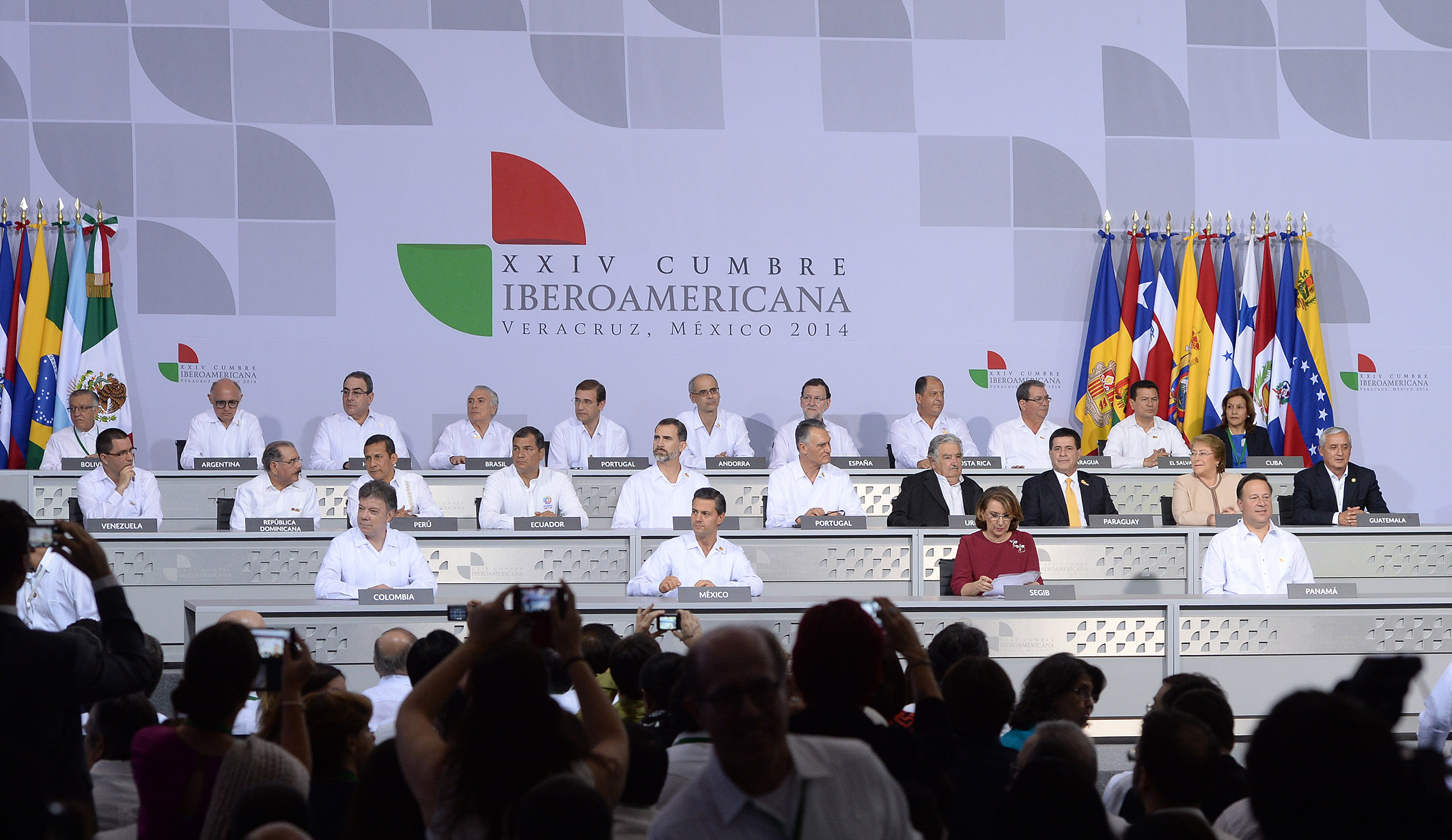
Mexican President Enrique Peña Nieto and Honduran President Juan Orlando Hernández in Veracruz City; December 2014.

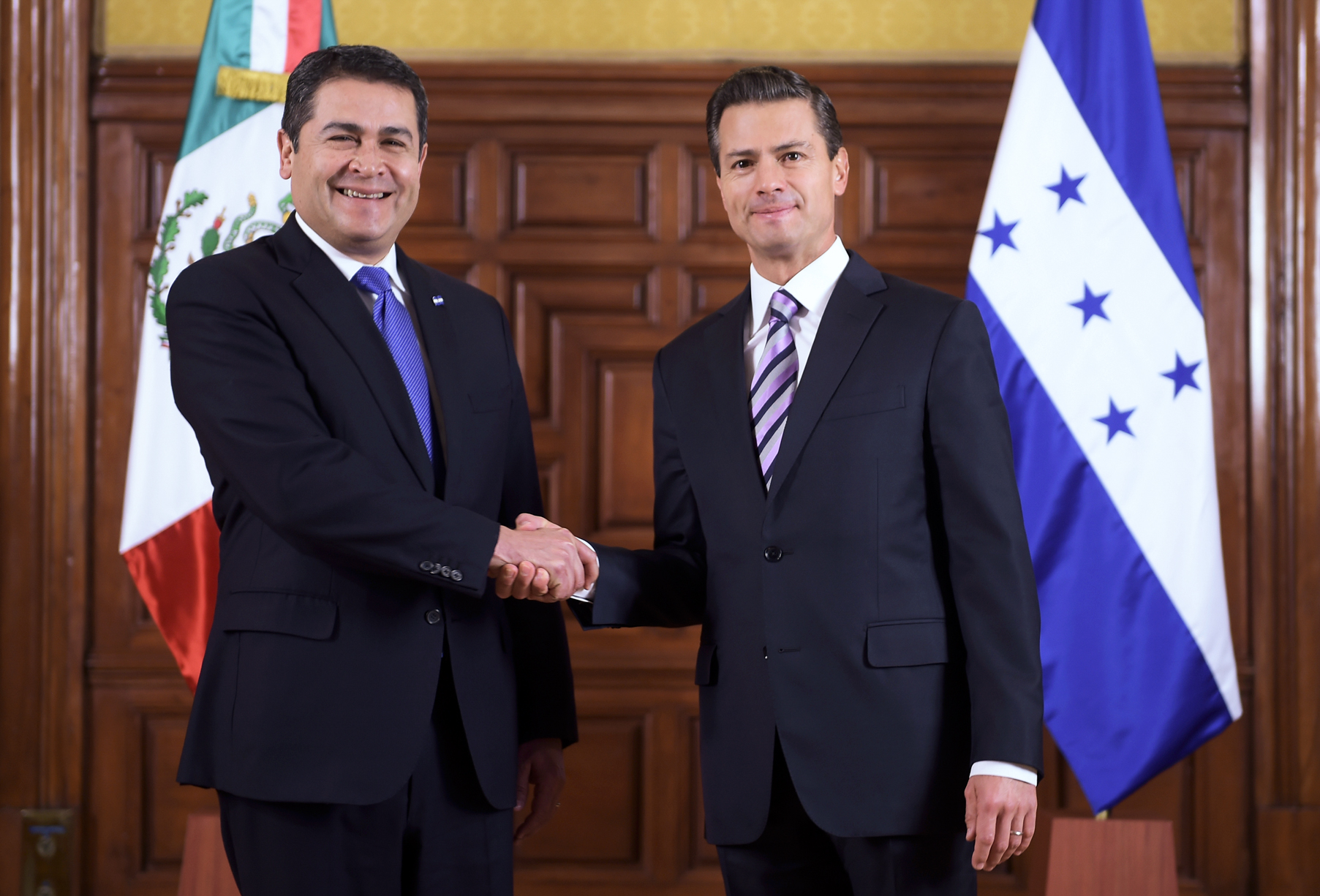
Honduran President Juan Orlando Hernández meeting with Mexican President Enrique Peña Nieto in Tegucigalpa, 2015.

== Bilateral agreements ==
Both nations have signed several bilateral agreements such as an Agreement on Touristic Cooperation (1990); Agreement on Combating Drug Trafficking and Drug Dependency (1990); Agreement on Scientific and Technical Cooperation (1995); Agreement on Educational and Cultural Cooperation (1998); Treaty on Joint Execution of Criminal Sentences (2003); Treaty on Mutual Legal Assistance in Criminal Matters (2004) and a Treaty on Maritime Delimitation (2005).

== Transportation ==
There are direct flights between Mexico City and San Pedro Sula with Aeroméxico Connect.

== Trade relations ==
In June 2000, Mexico and Honduras (along with Guatemala and El Salvador) signed a free trade agreement which took effect in 2001. Since then, both Costa Rica and Nicaragua have joined the joint free trade agreement. In 2023, total trade between Honduras and Mexico amounted to US$2.2 billion. Hondura's main exports to Mexico include: electrical wires and cables, palm oil, sugar cane, clothing, and motor vehicles parts and accessories. Mexico's main exports to Honduras include: copper wires, electrical wires, malt extracts, oils of petroleum, motor vehicles and chemical based products. Several Mexican multinational companies such as América Móvil, Cemex, Grupo Bimbo and Gruma (among others) operate in Honduras.

== Resident diplomatic missions ==
of Honduras in Mexico

- Mexico City (Embassy)
- Ciudad Juárez (Consulate-General)
- Monterrey (Consulate-General)
- San Luis Potosí (Consulate-General)
- Tapachula (Consulate-General)
- Tijuana (Consulate-General)
- Veracruz City (Consulate-General)
- Villahermosa (Consulate-General)
- Acayucan (Consular Agency)

of Mexico in Honduras

- Tegucigalpa (Embassy)
- San Pedro Sula

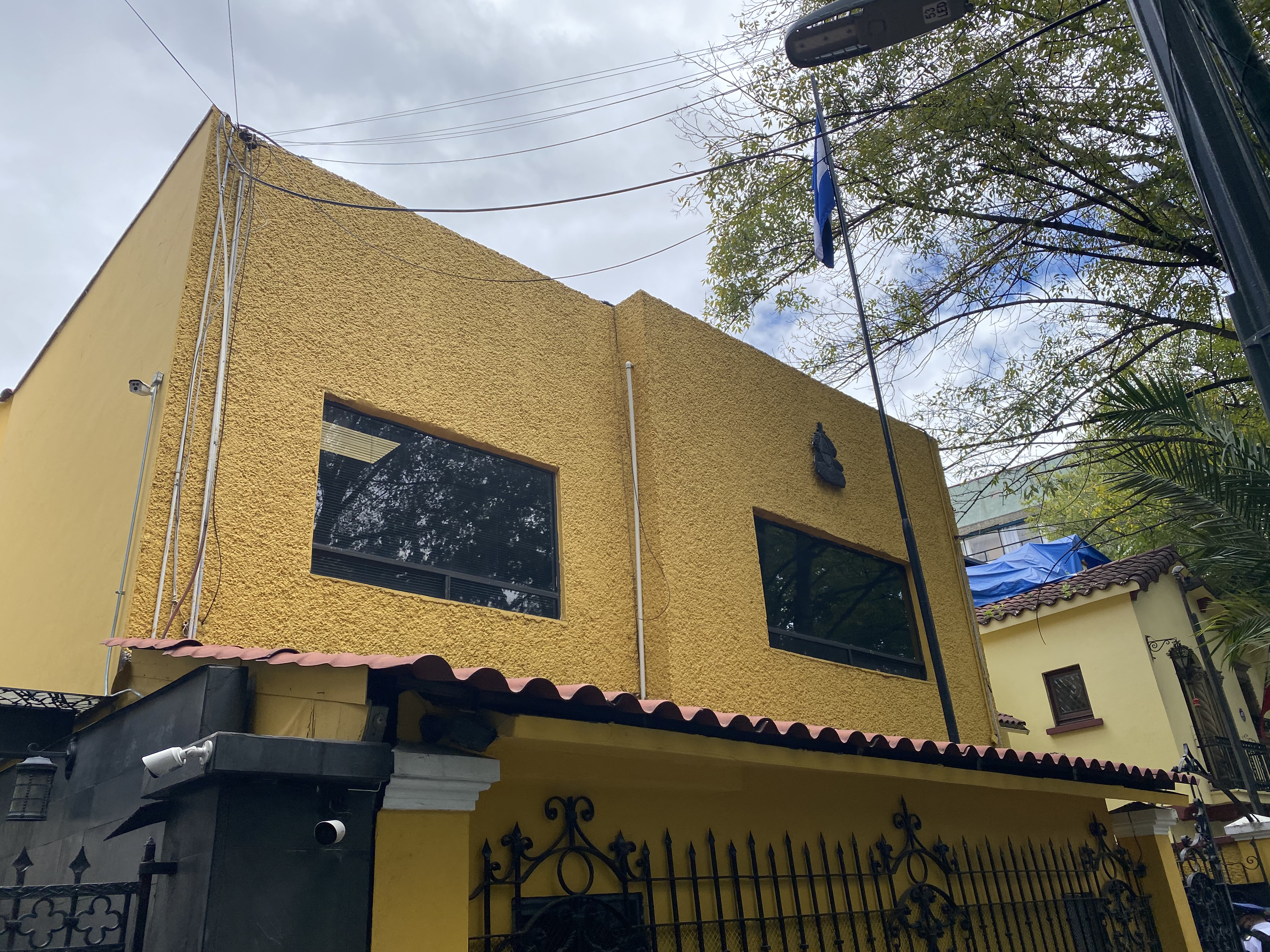
Embassy of Honduras in Mexico City

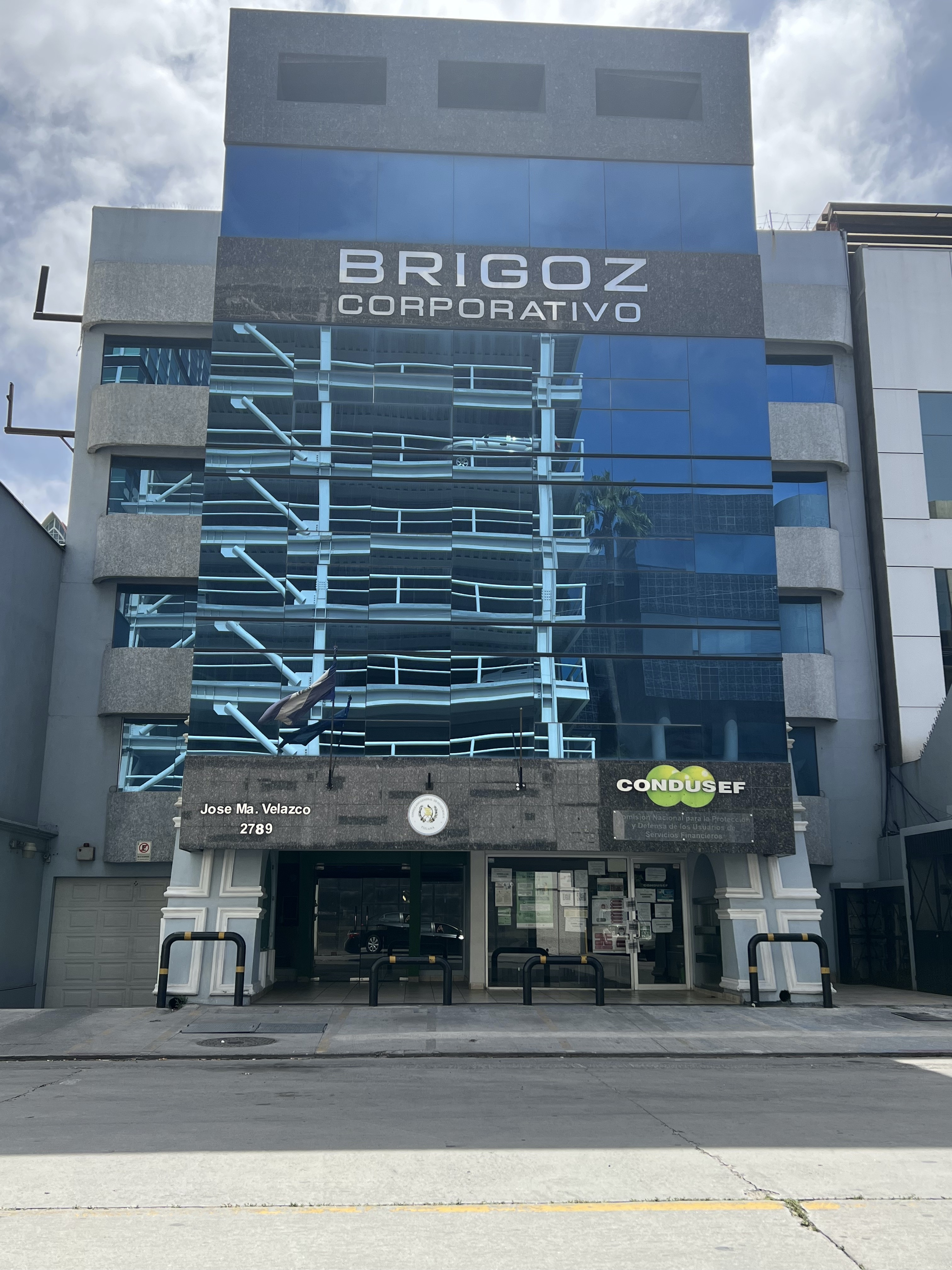
Consulate-General of Honduras in Tijuana

== Gallery ==
Bust of Mexican President Benito Juárez in San Pedro Sula

Flags of Honduras and Mexico during the signing of the Letter of Intent between Tegucigalpa and Mexico City

== See also ==
- Honduran diaspora
- Immigration to Mexico
