= Mexico–Nicaragua relations =

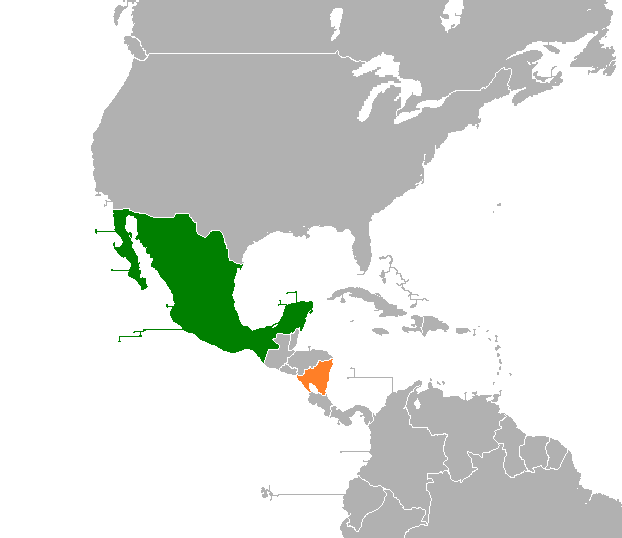

- Mexico: Nicaragua

The nations of Mexico and Nicaragua established diplomatic relations in 1839, however, relations were briefly severed in May 1979 and restored a few months later in July 1979 with the ousting of Nicaraguan President Anastasio Somoza Debayle. Diplomatic relations between both nations have continued unabated since.

Both nations are members of the Association of Caribbean States, Community of Latin American and Caribbean States, Organization of American States, Organization of Ibero-American States and the United Nations.

== History ==
Relations between what is now Mexico and Nicaragua have existed since pre-Columbian times, when Ahuizotl of Tenochtitlan sent groups of pochtecas to explore and establish relations with the indigenous peoples of Central America, where commercial relations developed between the Mexica and the Nicarao. Trade relations between Tenochtitlan and Nicānāhuac had flourished for almost two decades under Moctezuma II after he ascended to the throne of Tenochtitlan in 1502 CE, and Mexica merchants traded and thrived within Nicarao territory. Today, Mexico and Nicaragua are two Latin American nations that share a common cultural history from the Nahuas and the Oto-Manguean people. The two nations also share a common history in the fact that both nations were colonized by the Spanish Empire. In 1821, Mexico gained independence from Spain and Nicaragua became a part of the First Mexican Empire. In 1823, the empire dissolved and Nicaragua, along with Guatemala, El Salvador, Honduras and Costa Rica joined the United Provinces of Central America. In 1838, the union dissolved and Nicaragua became an independent nation. One year later, in 1839, Mexico and Nicaragua established diplomatic relations.

In 1937, the first of the Somoza presidents of Nicaragua took power. In the 1960s, the Nicaraguan Revolution began by a rebel group called the Sandinista National Liberation Front. During that time period Mexico, although initially a supporter of the Somoza's, soon changed position and offered support to the Sandinistas. In May 1979, Mexico broke diplomatic relations with Nicaragua over repeated human rights abuses carried out by the government of Anastasio Somoza Debayle. In July 1979, Anastasio Somoza Debayle was removed from power and Mexico re-established diplomatic relations with Nicaragua. In 1990, Mexico, along with the government of Colombia, Panama and Venezuela created the Contadora Group to try and mediate in the Central American crises that was gripping the region at the time. The Nicaraguan revolution came to an end after the election of President Violeta Chamorro in 1990.

Since the end of the revolution, Mexico and Nicaragua have worked together in numerous projects such as in disaster relief, migration and development. In 2001, both nations agreed to implement the Mesoamerica Project (also known as the Plan Puebla-Panama). In December 2012, Nicaraguan President Daniel Ortega attended the inauguration of Mexican President Enrique Peña Nieto.

In 2021, the Mexican government expressed its concerns of detentions of political activists and protestors by the Nicaraguan government. In February 2023, Mexican President Andrés Manuel López Obrador stated that Mexico would grant asylum to any Nicaraguan person who requested it. As a result, more than 50,000 humanitarian visas have been issued to Nicaraguan citizens each year in Mexico. In January 2024, Nicaragua closed its consulate in Tapachula, Chiapas in order to deny consular services for Nicaraguan migrants leaving the country.

== High-level visits ==
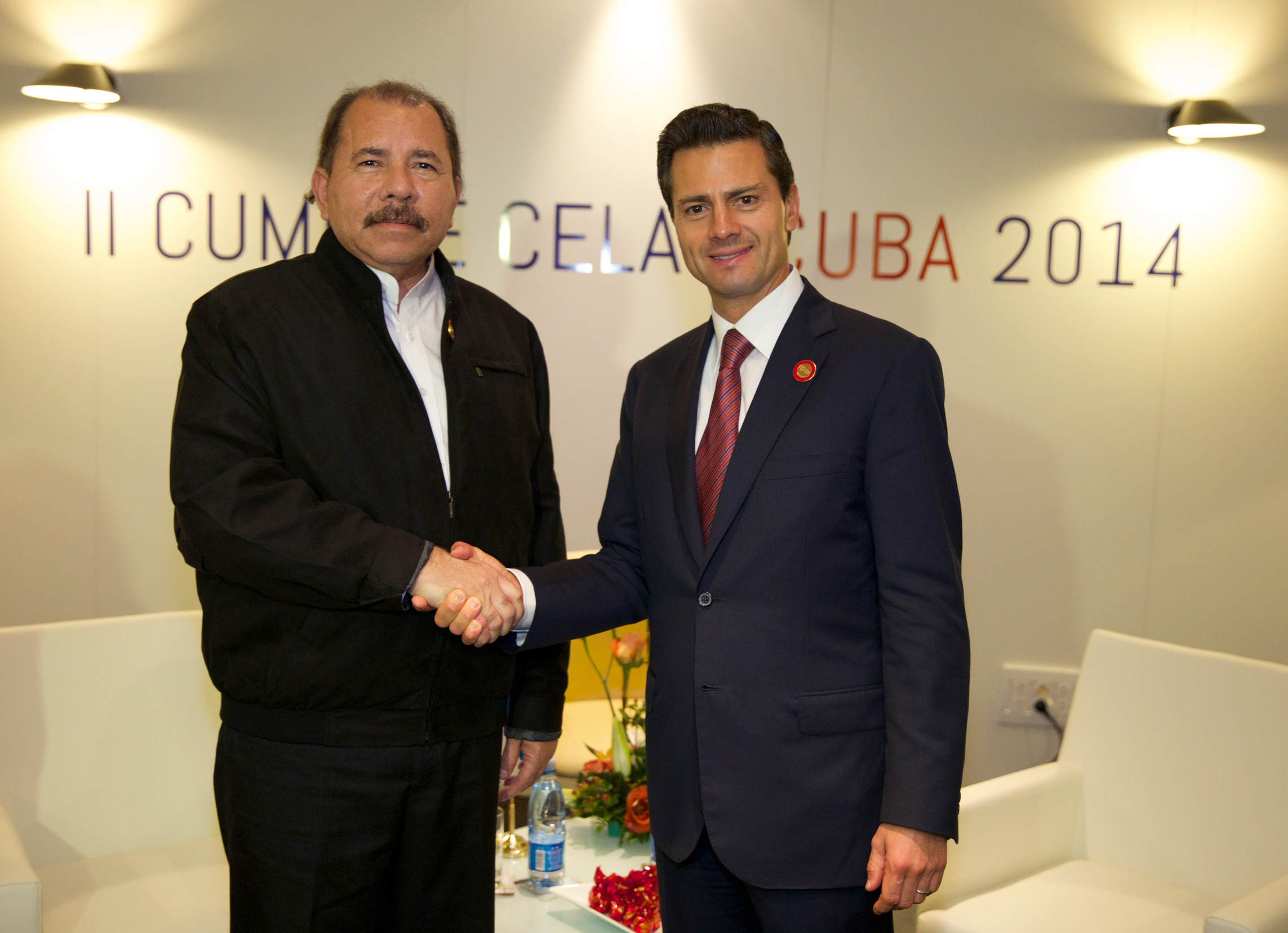
Nicaraguan President Daniel Ortega and Mexican President Enrique Peña Nieto in Havana, Cuba; 2014.

Presidential visits from Nicaragua to Mexico

- President Daniel Ortega (1985, 1988, 2007, 2010, 2012)
- President Violeta Chamorro (1990, 1991, 1993)
- President Arnoldo Alemán (1997, 2000)
- President Enrique Bolaños (March & June 2002)

Presidential visits from Mexico to Nicaragua

- President Gustavo Díaz Ordaz (1966)
- President Carlos Salinas de Gortari (1993)
- President Ernesto Zedillo (1997)
- President Vicente Fox (2004)
- President Felipe Calderón (2007, 2009)

== Bilateral agreements ==
Both nations have signed several bilateral agreements such as an Agreement on the Exchange of Diplomatic Communications (1919); Agreement of Governmental Cooperation (1983); Agreement of Touristic Cooperation (1990); Agreement of Cooperation to Combat Drug Trafficking and Drug Dependency (1992); Extradition Treaty (1993); Agreement of Technical and Scientific Cooperation (1995); Treaty of Cooperation on Mutual Legal Assistance in Criminal Matters (1997); Treaty on the Execution of Criminal Judgments (2000) and an Agreement on Educational and Cultural Cooperation (2000).

== Transportation ==
There are direct flights between Mexico and Managua with Aeroméxico Connect.

== Trade relations ==
In 1997, Mexico and Nicaragua signed a free trade agreement. Since its establishment (and with the implementation of a New Mexico-Central America free trade agreement in 2013), trade between the two nations has grown substantially. In 2023, two-way trade between both nations amounted to US$1.5 billion. Mexico's main exports to Nicaragua include: electronic appliances, copper wire, medicines and vehicles while Nicaragua's main exports to Mexico include: vehicle parts, peanuts, vegetable oil, sugar and textiles. Several Mexican multinational companies such as América Móvil, Cemex, Grupo Bimbo and Grupo Lala (among others) operate in Nicaragua.

== Resident diplomatic missions ==
- Mexico has an embassy in Managua.
- Nicaragua has an embassy in Mexico City.
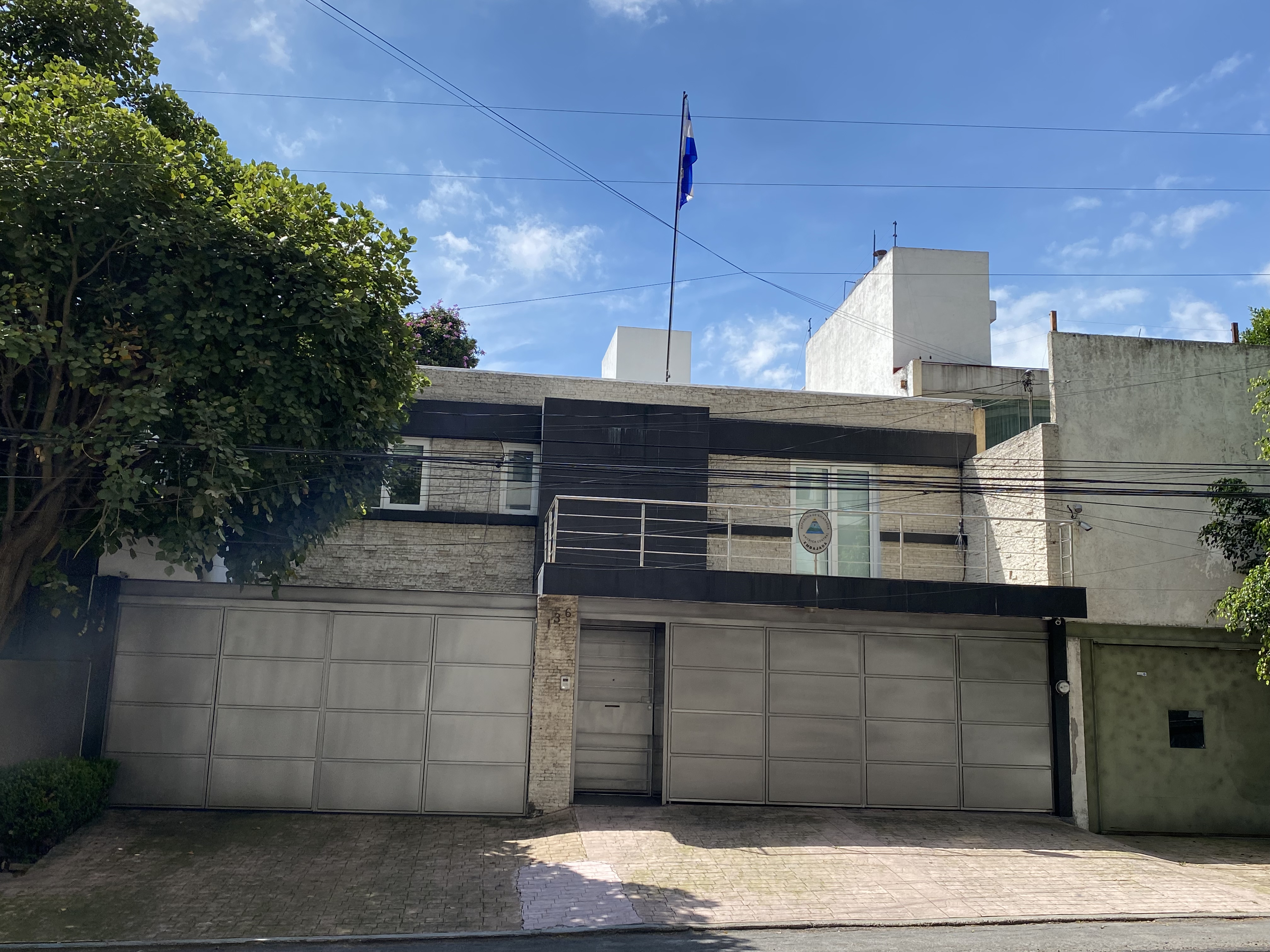
Embassy of Nicaragua in Mexico City

== Gallery ==
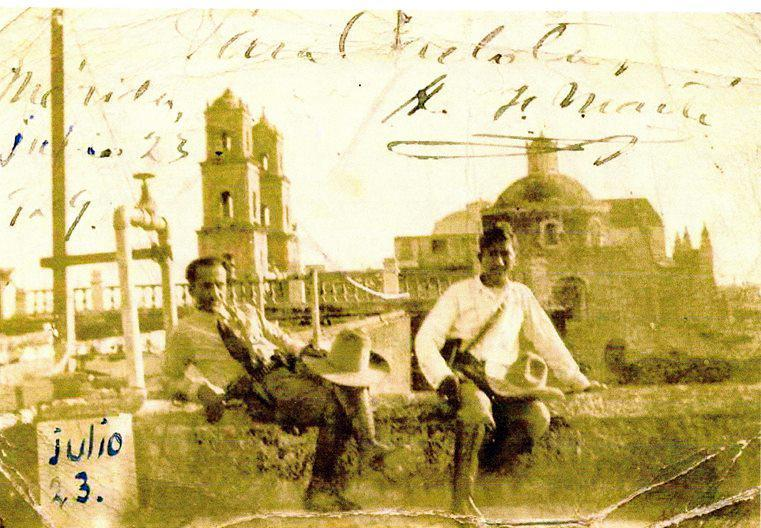
Nicaraguan revolutionary Augusto César Sandino and Salvadoran revolutionary Farabundo Martí in Mérida, Mexico

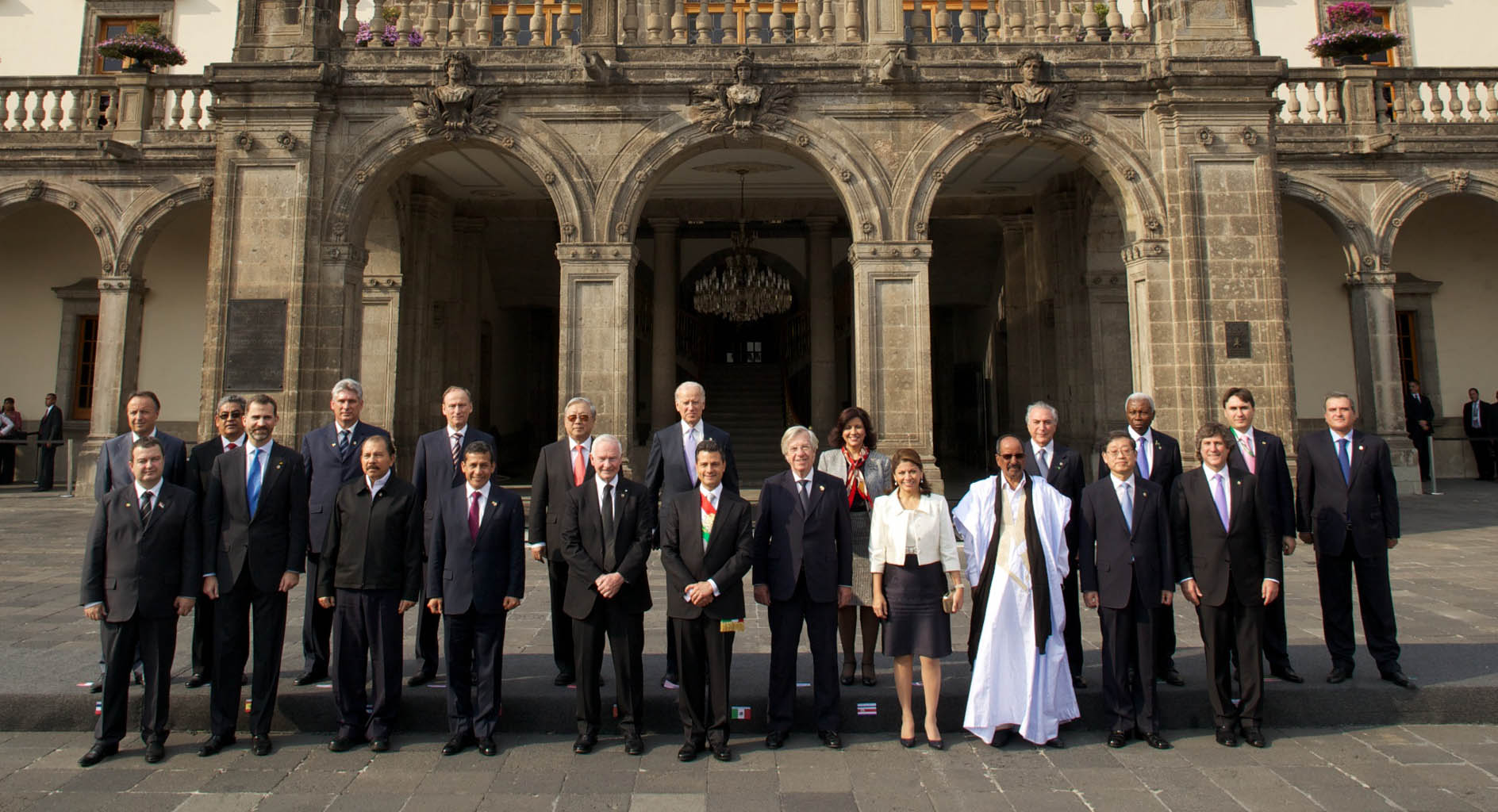
Nicaraguan President Daniel Ortega attending the inauguration of Mexican President Enrique Peña Nieto in Mexico City; 2012

== See also ==
- Nicaraguan diaspora
- Nicaraguan Revolution
