= Consultive Junta (Guatemala) =

Guatemalan provisional government

Consultive Junta Junta Consultiva
- Military junta
- Formation: 15 September 1821
- Extinction: 21 February 1822
- Country: Guatemala

Executive branch
- Superior Political Chief: Gabino Gaínza
- Headquarters: Guatemala City

Consultive Junta
Preceded by	Succeeded by
Captaincy General of Guatemala	First Mexican Empire

The Consultive Junta (Spanish: Junta Consultiva) was the government of Central America from its declaration of independence from the Spanish Empire on 15 September 1821 until its dissolution on 21 February 1822. The junta was led by Guatemalan General Gabino Gaínza.

On 5 January 1822, the junta voted for annexation to the First Mexican Empire.
