= Joaquín de Oreamuno =

Costa Rican coup leader (1755–1827)

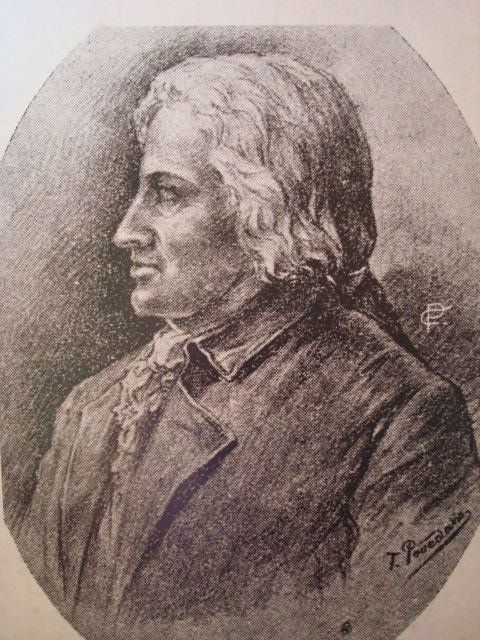
- Born: Joaquín Mariano de Oreamuno y Muñoz de la Trinidad; 14 July 1755; Cartago, Costa Rica
- Died: 13 November 1827 (aged 72); Cartago, Costa Rica

Joaquín Mariano de Oreamuno (14 July 1755 – 13 November 1827) was a Costa Rican politician who led a coup in 1823 that attempted to make Costa Rica part of the First Mexican Empire. A few days later the imperialist forces were defeated by republicans under Gregorio José Ramírez in the Battle of Ochomogo.

== Family ==
Joaquín Mariano de Oreamuno y Muñoz de la Trinidad was born on 14 July 1755 in the town of Cartago, Costa Rica. His paternal family was of noble Basque origin, and included a knight of the Order of Santiago. Two brothers, Francisco Xavier Oriamuno and José Antonio de Oriamuno, had been born in Panama and came to Costa Rica in the 1720s, where they changed their name to Oreamuno. Their children were among the leading nobles of the country. His parents were José Antonio de Oreamuno y García de Estrada and María Encarnación Muñoz de la Trinidad. His mother's family, the Muñoz de la Trinidad, were of an equally noble family from Seville. They belonged to a small group of patricians that controlled the province at this time.

== Early years ==
Joaquín Mariano was baptized on 15 July 1755 in the parish of Santiago. His godparents were his paternal grandfather Francisco Xavier de Oreamuno y Vásquez-Meléndez, a former lieutenant governor of the province, and María de Arburola y Hoces-Navarro, sister of his maternal grandmother. A year after Joaquín Mariano was born, his great uncle José Antonio de Oreamuno y Vásquez-Meléndez was appointed acting governor of the province. The local school provided only a basic education, but Oreamuno gained hands-on experience in managing the family livestock farm and negotiating with dealers and officials. He taught himself the elements of law and medicine from his father's library, developed a taste for literature and even wrote some poetry and plays. As a hidalgo he was naturally an officer in the local militia. In January 1782 he was elected Mayordomo de Propios^{(es)}, an unpaid position in which he was responsible for managing the assets and income of the city council.

Oreamuno married Florencia Pia Josefa Jiménez y Rodríguez de Robledo. She was from a wealthy patrician family. The marriage took place on 11 November 1782 in the parish of Santiago. They would have nine children, several of whom died in infancy.

On 27 March 1787 Oreamuno was appointed notary public of the vicariate of Cartago by Juan Félix de Villegas, Bishop of Nicaragua and Costa Rica. In July 1788 Don Joaquín acquired a large cattle ranch near the Rio Grande on the road to the Pacific, and over the years that followed Don Joaquín became owner of a large herd of cattle and horses, and was active in trading cattle and hides. He also served in the local militia, where he became a lieutenant, and continued as notary of the vicariate. King Charles III of Spain died in December 1788. Governor Perié became seriously ill and appointed Joaquín's father as interim governor of Costa Rica. Perié died on 7 January 1789 and Don José Antonio continued as governor. In 1789 Oreamuno became involved in dispute over boundaries with his neighbor, and at one point knocked his opponent to the ground in exchange for an insult. This led to a trial in which Oreamuno was acquitted, then a survey of the properties, and then a lengthy process of claims and counterclaims. Governor Vázquez sided with Oreamuno, and the eventual settlement was in his favour.

The French Revolution broke out in 1789, and in January 1793 King Louis XVI of France was guillotined. A war began between France and Spain that would lead to the Bourbons of Spain being deposed. The conflict had little effect on the sleepy rural economy of Costa Rica. Don Joaquín turned 38 in July 1793. He was a respected figure in Cartago with a successful livestock business and a reputation as an amateur lawyer in a country where there were no professionals.

== Constitutional disputes ==
On 15 February 1814 Oreamuno was elected deputy for Cartago. The other deputies were Evaristo Gutiérrez (Nicoya), Manuel Alvarado Alvarado (Valle Hermosa: San José), Pedro Antonio Solares (Heredia and Alajuela) and José Francisco Garcia (Ujarrás, Orosí and Tucurrique). All of these men were prominent and wealthy inhabitants of Costa Rica. The deputies did not take office, because the Cortes were dissolved in 1814 and the provincial councils abolished when the Spanish Constitution of 1812 was abolished by King Ferdinand VII.

During December 1821 and the first two weeks of January 1822 Costa Rica began to comply with the stipulations of the Covenant of Concord, which would form a government while the situation with the Mexican Empire was being clarified. The Interim Council was elected on 1 December 1821. The Electoral Council reformed the Covenant on 10 January 1822 to allow annexation of the province to Mexico, and two imperial deputies were elected, José Francisco de Peralta and José Antonio Alvarado, both prominent men from Cartago who lived in Guatemala. San Jose did not threaten armed opposition to the annexation, but both that town and Alajuela were very critical of annexation and concerned about the constitutional implications. Finally the Electoral Council elected the members of the Superior Governing Council that would govern Costa Rica from 13 January to 31 December 1822. Oreamuno was a member of the Interim Council and the Electoral Council. He was not a member of the Superior Governing Council.

In May 1822 Agustín de Iturbide proclaimed himself Emperor of Mexico, with plans to extend his rule to all of Central America. The agrarian and aristocratic landowners of Cartago and Heredia wanted to maintain the privileges they had held under the former Spanish empire. They thought these would be protected under the new Mexican Empire. The liberal merchants of San José and Alajuela wanted to introduce a republican government. The leaders of the four towns of the Central Valley met and agreed to remain neutral until the situation became clearer.

A new Governing Council was elected in Cartago on 24 December 1822 and took office on 1 January 1823, with José Santos Lombardo Alvarado as president. The council was to have ruled throughout 1823 during the constitutional process for annexation to Mexico. However, the crisis in Mexican politics affected all of Central America, and the council lasted only until 14 March 1823. In February the discussions between annexationists and non-annexationists became extremely heated, and the council ordered open meetings in all the towns to draw up three lists by 2 March: those in favour of the empire, the republicans and those who wanted some other option. By March 1823 the Superior Governing Council of Costa Rica had still not declared allegiance to the emperor, and the conservatives decided to stage a coup.

== Attempted coup ==
On 29 March 1823 a group of Cartago residents led by Oreamuno occupied the army barracks and proclaimed that Costa Rica would join the Mexican Empire. Oreamuno said the formal ceremony of allegiance to the empire would take effect on 6 April. The Republican leader Gregorio José Ramírez sent an ultimatum to the imperialists on 4 April 1823. The two armies met in the morning of 5 April at Ochomogo, near Cartago. Oreamuno remained at home resting in Cartago for the first few hours. There was an attempt to negotiate, but that quickly broke down and both sides began firing their muskets from the cover of the large volcanic rocks that litter the area. The combat was prolonged, but in the end the forces of Cartago were completely defeated.

Oreamuno died in Cartago on 13 November 1827 at the age of 72.

== Sources ==
- "Batalla de Ochomogo", Guías Costa Rica (in Spanish), 28 June 2013
- Carbonell, Jorge Francisco Sáenz (1994), Don Joaquín de Oreamuno y Muñoz de la Trinidad: vida de un monárquico costarricense (in Spanish), EUNED, ISBN 978-9977-64-784-5
- Fernández Guardia, Ricardo (2007), La independencia: historia de Costa Rica (in Spanish), San José, Costa Rica: EUNED, ISBN 9789968314992
- Kaiser, James (1 January 2015), Costa Rica: The Complete Guide: Ecotourism in Costa Rica (Color Travel Guide), Destination Press, ISBN 978-1-940754-01-7
- Latorre, Gustavo (13 May 2016), "Joaquín Joaquín Oreamuno y Muñoz de la Trinidad, Gobernador de Costa Rica", Geni.com
- Obregón, Clotilde María (2000), El proceso electoral y el poder ejecutivo en Costa Rica: 1808-1998 (in Spanish), Editorial Universidad de Costa Rica, ISBN 978-9977-67-618-0
