= Santiago de Bonilla y Laya-Bolívar =

President of the Junta Superior Gubernativa of Costa Rica

José Santiago de Bonilla y Laya-Bolívar (28 July 1756 – 2 March 1824) was president of the Junta Superior Gubernativa of Costa Rica from April to July 1822. His brother Miguel de Bonilla y Laya-Bolívar was also a politician.
