= League War =

Costa Rican civil war

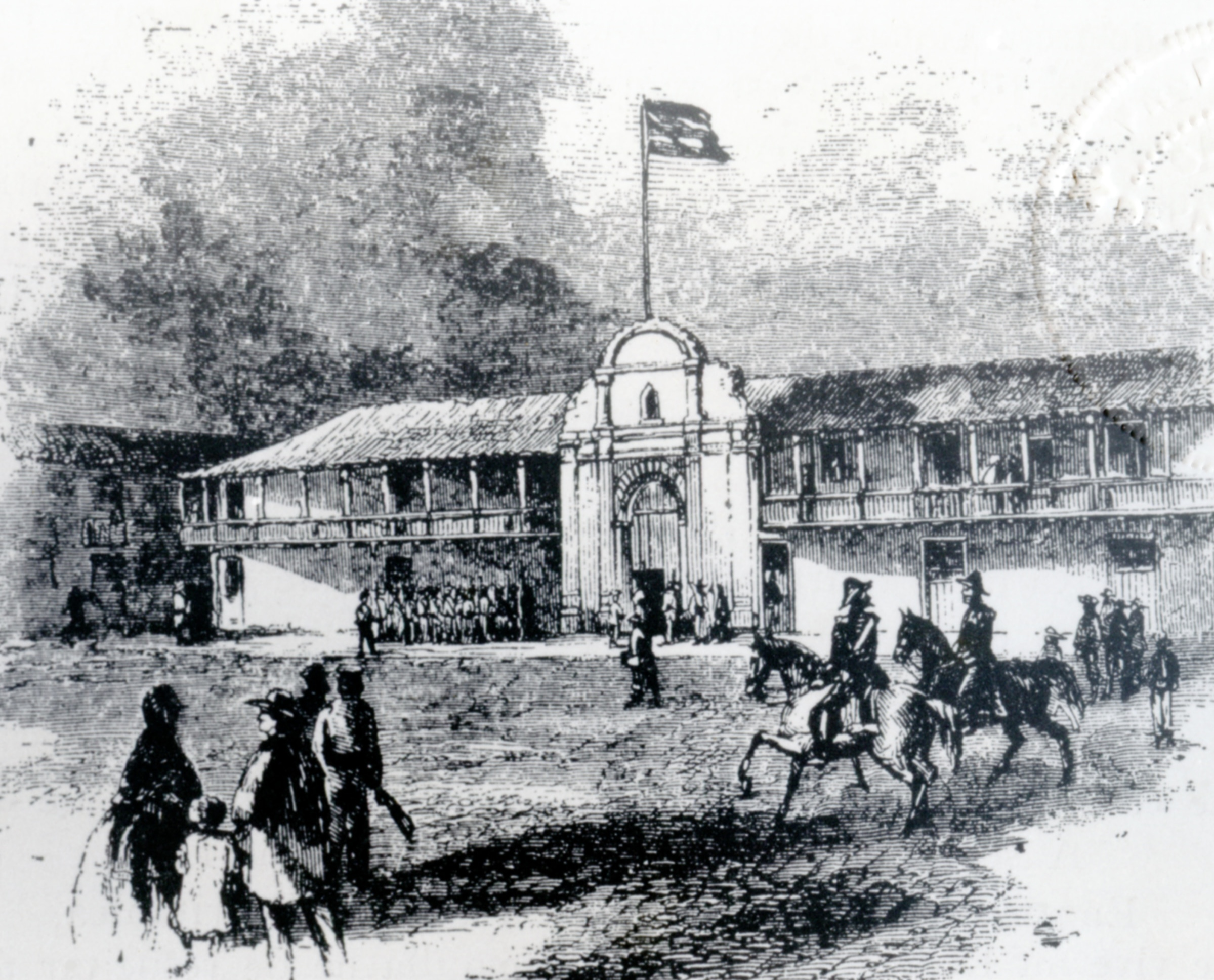
- San José Main Barracks
Date	September – October 1835
Location	Costa Rica
Result	Josefine victory: San José is later made Costa Rica's Capital.

Belligerents
San José	Alajuela; Cartago; Heredia

Commanders and leaders
Braulio Carrillo Colina	Nicolás Ulloa Soto

Strength
1,000+ soldiers	4,300 militia

The League War was the second civil war of Costa Rica, as a member state of the Federal Republic of Central America. It passed between September and October 1835 in the Central Valley of Costa Rica. Its immediate trigger was the repeal of the "Ambulance Law", the law that established the rotation of the country's capital among the four constituent cities. The most important consequence was the triumph of the city of San José over the cities of Alajuela, Heredia and Cartago (which formed the League of Three Cities, thus the name), which allowed its consolidation as the capital of Costa Rica.

== Background ==
The conflict was a product of the political inexperience of the Costa Ricans in the years after Independence from Spain, and of the local disputes in the Central Valley of Costa Rica. Cartago had been the capital of the Province of Costa Rica from 1563 to 1823 (260 years) until the Ochomogo War in 1823 when San José became the new capital of the Free State of Costa Rica, as part of the Federal Republic of Central America.

In 1833 Cartago citizens choose José Rafael de Gallegos y Alvarado as Head of State of Costa Rica expecting to see the return of the capital to Cartago. The plan was to establish the "Ambulance Law" so that the capital would be passed to Alajuela, Heredia, and when it arrived in Cartago the Law would be abolished.

In March 1834 the Congress of Costa Rica, marked at that time by localism, approved the Ambulance Law, and the capital was transferred to the town of Alajuela. This movement of all the documents and resources of the state government to a small village resulted in many setbacks that rendered the State inoperative.

In San José, the opposition to the government of Gallegos established a newspaper called La Tertulia to mock the Head of State, the Ambulance Law, and the peasants of Alajuela. In this way, in March 1835 Gallegos resigned as Head of State. In his place the law graduate and neighbor of San José Braulio Carrillo Colina was elected, who almost immediately repealed the Ambulance Law.

The Congress decided that a new capital should be founded in a neutral space. For this they chose the area known as San Juan del Murciélago, modern day Tibás, between San José and Heredia. While the necessary buildings were being built there, the Executive and Judicial powers would reside in San José, and the Parliament in Heredia.

The repeal of the Ambulance Law caused great displeasure in Cartago, and the people of Alajuela protested for the removal of the capital from their town (Alajuela had to be the capital until 1838).

On the 26 September 1835 the city of Cartago ignored the government of Braulio Carrillo and appointed the coffee grower Nicolás Ulloa Soto as Head of State to re-establish the Ambulance Law. Almost immediately Alajuela accepted the Ulloa government. A few days later Heredia joined the fight against San José, completing the League of Three Cities. This is how the Second Civil War of Costa Rica began.

=== Combatants ===
In early October the militias of Cartago, Alajuela and Heredia besieged San José, blocking all their exits and entrances with artillery, infantry and cavalry riders.

There were negotiations between the government and the insurgents before the outbreak of hostilities, to avoid the bloodshed. However, negotiations broke down on the 9 October when the Cartago militia, with some 1,300 men under Colonel Máximo Cordero and using the statue of the Virgin of the Angels as a standard, attacked San José by Curridabat.

The government of Braulio Carrillo Colina entrusted General Antonio Pinto Soares (veteran and hero of the Battle of Ochomogo) and Sergeant Major Manuel Quijano with the defence of San José. The soldiers and citizens dug trenches and erected barricades as quickly as possible, and the San José militia went into combat.

At the same time the forces of Alajuela and Heredia, with some 3,000 men under the command of Alajuela Colonel José Ángel Soto, invaded San Juan del Murciélago.

== War ==
=== Battle of Cuesta de Moras ===
On the morning of the 14 October the men of the San José militia under the command of Sergeant Major Manuel Quijano stopped the advance of the Cartaginese in Cuesta de Moras. After a violent battle, the Cartago militia began to retreat towards what is now known as Barrio La California, from where it was clear that they had been defeated. Trying to escape from the Josefine troops, the Cartaginese were again defeated in Curridabat and Ochomogo. That same night, Sergeant Major Manuel Quijano took the city of Cartago.

The historian Ricardo Fernández Guardia, says that "... the greatest trophy was the miraculous image of the Virgin of the Angels, which the Cartaginese left abandoned in Curridabat." The sacred statue belonged to the Parish of San José until 1842, when the Cartaginese brought General Francisco Morazán to overthrow Braulio Carrillo.

=== Battle of the Virilla River ===
After these events, the militias of Alajuela and Heredia left San Juan del Murciélago and barricaded themselves on the banks of the Virilla River.

On the morning of 28 October, about 1,000 soldiers from San José under General Antonio Pinto Soares attacked the rebel trenches with artillery and bayonets. The rebels, in a total disorder, ordered the withdrawal to Heredia to build barricades. However, Heredians and Alajuelans were defeated in a number of following engagements. Finally, Heredia and Alajuela were occupied the night of the 28 October.

Thus ended the civil war, and San José was consolidated as the capital of the Free State of Costa Rica.

== Aftermath ==
After San José was consolidated as the capital of Costa Rica. Some leaders of the League left the country. Others were locked in jail. The commander of the Cuartel de Cartago, Sergeant Major Francisco Roldán, was shot for treason (he handed over the arsenal to the rebels). However, in 1838 the government decreed a general amnesty in for all those who were implicated in the 1835 uprising.

In the aftermath of the war, Carrillo pursued further political centralization. A series of reforms were introduced, including the foundation of a military academy, the introduction of a civil code, and police regulations. Carrillo's policies faced opposition from regional elites, and four coups took place over the following decade.
