= Gregorio José Ramírez =

Costa Rican politician and sailor (1796–1823)

"Meritorious of the Homeland" Gregorio José Ramírez y Castro
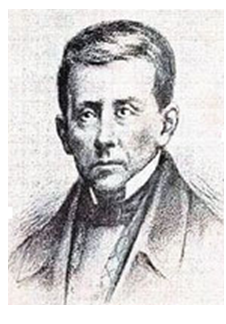

2nd General Commander of Arms of Costa Rica
- In office April 5, 1823 – April 16, 1823
- Preceded by: Joaquín de Oreamuno
- Succeeded by: José María de Peralta

Personal details
- Born: March 27, 1796 San José, New Spain, Spain
- Died: December 4, 1823 (aged 27) Alajuela, Federal Republic of Central America
- Occupation: Politician, Merchant and Marine

Gregorio José Ramírez y Castro (1796–1823) was a Costa Rican politician, merchant and marine who was most notable for being the 2nd General Commander of Arms of Costa Rica from April 5 to April 16, 1823.

== Biography ==
=== Personal life ===
He was born in San José, New Spain on March 27, 1796, in a family of noble extraction. His parents were Gregorio Ramírez y Otárola (1749 - 1803), lieutenant governor of San José in 1791, and Rafaela Castro y Alvarado. He did not get married.

=== Seafaring Life ===
Due to asthmatic ailments, he dedicated himself to the marine life since his adolescence. He became captain of merchant ships that carried out activities between Puntarenas and Panama, although in 1821 he was accused in court of not rendering accounts properly to one of the owners. From March to June 1819 he was part of a detachment for the coastal defense of the Costa Rican Pacific, under the orders of Captain Don Salvador de Oreamuno.

=== Political activity during Independence ===
He represented the population of Alajuela in the Board of Legates of the Peoples that on December 1, 1821, issued the Pact of Concord.

From April to December 1822 he was absent from Costa Rica as he was on a trip along the coasts of the South American Pacific.

Upon his return to Costa Rica, he represented Alajuela in a town delegate board in February 1823 and spoke out in favor of a republican system of government. Later he was elected deputy for Alajuela to the Provincial Congress that began sessions on March 1, 1823 .

=== Ochomogo War ===
He was residing in Alajuela when there was news of the monarchical coup of Joaquín de Oreamuno. The local City Council appointed him general commander of the Arms and took command of the republican forces of Alajuela and San José. On April 5 of 1823, at the Battle of Ochomogo, his troops defeated the royalist forces and then occupied the city of Cartago, then capital of Costa Rica.

=== Commander of Arms ===
From his military victory he exercised the supreme command of Costa Rica, as general commander of the Arms. During his administration, the capital of Cartago was transferred to San José and the Constituent Congress was convened again for sessions. Once this group was reunited, under the presidency of José María de Peralta, Ramírez handed him power on April 16, 1823. He retained the military command until his death.

=== Death ===
He died in Alajuela, Costa Rica, on December 4, 1823. The Legislative Assembly declared him Benemérito de la Patria in 1971 .
