= José Francisco de Peralta =

Costa Rican politician

José Francisco de Peralta y López del Corral

Deputy of the Legislative Assembly of Costa Rica

Personal details
- Born: April 3, 1786 Cartago, Costa Rica
- Died: September 16, 1844 (aged 58) Cartago
- Profession: Priest

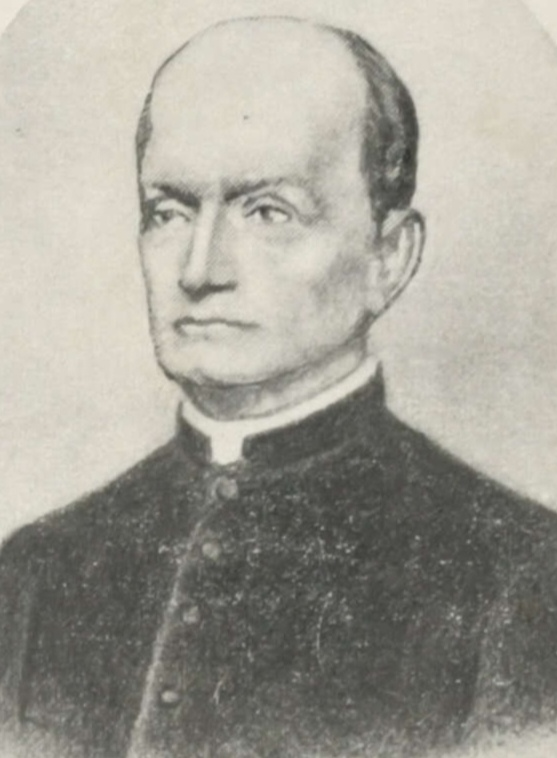
José Francisco de Peralta

José Francisco de Peralta y López del Corral (April 3, 1786 - September 16, 1844) was a Costa Rican priest and politician. He was born in Cartago, Costa Rica, the son of José María de Peralta y La Vega and Ana Benita de Nava López del Corral. Peralta attended the University of León and was ordained as a pastor in León, Nicaragua in 1812. He was named a parish priest for the village Olocuilta, El Salvador.

In 1822, Costa Rica elected Peralta to represent it in the First Constituent Congress of the Mexican Empire, but he did not attend the Congress, because he did not receive instruction from the municipal council of Cost Rican until September, too late to arrive before Iturbide abolished the Congress in October. In 1825, he was elected Deputy for Costa Rica to the Congress of the Federal Republic of Central America, a post which he held until 1826, during which he participated in the legislation of several important laws, including the annexation of the Partido de Nicoya to Costa Rica.

From 1827 to 1828 Peralta was a Deputy for Ujarrás in the Legislative Assembly of the State of Costa Rica, and in November, 1829, he was elected to represent Costa Rica in the Senate of the Federal Republic of Central America. From 1832 to 1833 he was the Deputy for Santa Cruz, Costa Rica in the Legislative Assembly of the State of Costa Rica. Peralta served as President of the Assembly from September 1832 to February 1833 and from July 1833 to September 1833.

In 1835, Peralta participated in the Costa Rican civil war, the Guerra de la Liga (English: "War of the League") against Head of State Braulio Carrillo Colina. For this reason, his property was seized by the state and he had to flee in exile.

Peralta had been an enthusiastic admirer of General Francisco Morazán, who he honored during the general's stay in Cartago, Costa Rica in 1834. Peralta was one of the most prominent supporters of the government of General Francisco Morazán, who rose to power on 12 April 1842. As a result, Peralta was elected Deputy for Cartago to the Constituent Assembly convened by Morazán, which began on 10 July 1842 in San José, Costa Rica. Peralta was named President of the Assembly. Among the legislative projects that he pushed were the creation of the college San Luis Gozaga in Cartago, which would not actually open until 1869.

Peralta died in Cartago on 16 September 1844, after an accident riding a horse. He left an important bequest for the foundation of a school for the children of Cartago, an institution which retains his name today. In the city a bust in honor of Peralta was unveiled in 1917.

== Bibliography ==
- Obregón Loría, Rafael (1966). El Poder Legislativo en Costa Rica (in Spanish) (1 ed.). San José: Editorial Costa Rica.
- Ortiz de Aragón, Mireya (1997). La herencia del prócer (1 ed.). Cartago: Editorial A.G. COVAO.
