= Rafael Francisco Osejo =

Costa Rican politician (1790–1848)

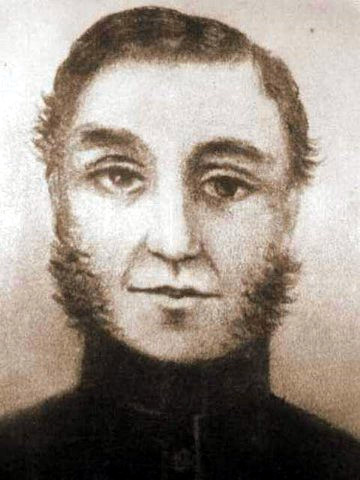

Rafael Francisco Osejo was a Nicaraguan educator who governed Costa Rica in March 1823.

== Biography ==
He was born around 1790, possibly in the indigenous community of Sutiava, in the vicinity of León. The given names of his parents and his mother's maiden name are not known, although some sources mention the latter as Escamilla.

He had some Indian and African ancestry, as he is mentioned as mestizo, mulatto or zambo. He was not married, but he had an illegitimate son in Cartago who died as a teenager.

== Education ==
He graduated BA in Philosophy at the University of León. The House Teaching of St. Thomas, located in San Jose, Costa Rica, in 1829 was awarded the degree of Bachelor of Civil Law.

== Labor educator and academic ==
He moved in 1814 to San Jose, Costa Rica, to teach Philosophy (Humanities) at Saint Thomas School (Casa de Enseñanza de Santo Tomás), where he was appointed Rector in May of that year, a month after starting to teach there. He held that office until February 1815, but remained in charge of the department of Philosophy. In 1817 he moved to Carthage, where he taught philosophy. His pupils included Francisco Maria Oreamuno Francisco Bonilla and Joaquín Bernardo Calvo Rosales. In July 1824 he was appointed teacher in primary education at Saint Thomas School and in 1830 Professor of Philosophy at that institution.

== Public life ==
The bachelor Osejo held some public offices in Costa Rica in the last years of Spanish rule. He was appointed as a member of the Consular Court in 1819, he was made a member of the council of the City of Ujarrás in 1820 and he was appointed to serve on the Board of Health of the city of Cartago in 1821. In 1820 he participated in a serious conflict with the Subordinate Political Head of Costa Rica Juan Manuel de Cañas-Trujillo, who objected to a position Osejo adopted in a speech during the act of swearing allegiance to the Constitution of Cádiz in Cartago.

== Performance policy at the time of Independence ==
He played an outstanding political role in Costa Rica in the early years of independence and was one of the most important figures of the groups sympathetic to Republican system and opposed to the annexation to the Mexican Empire of Iturbide. The Ujarrás City Council nominated him as a representative on the Board of Legacies of Peoples which met in November 1821 under the presidency of Nicolás Carrillo y Aguirre, but although he was elected Secretary of the Board, his credentials were canceled. During the year 1822 he turned away from politics and devoted himself to mining in the mountains of Avocado. In February 1823, he became very active in opposing annexation to Mexico and advocating the accession of Costa Rica to Colombia. He was elected as a Member of the Provincial Constituent Congress that met in Cartago on 3 March 1823 and on the 8th of that month decided on the separation of Costa Rica from the Mexican Empire. He served for a time as Secretary of the Congress.

== President of the Delegation of Costa Rica ==
On 14 March 1823 the Provincial Congress elected Francisco Rafael Osejo to be one of the members of the Delegation of Costa Rica, a board of three members and two alternates that was to assume power in place of the presiding Superior Governing Board Jose Santos Lombardo y Alvarado. The other two full members were Manuel María de Peralta and Lopez del Corral and Morales Bonilla Hermenegidlo. Alejandro Garcia-Escalante Juan Nava and Jose Bonilla and Herdocia were elected as alternates. The council began its work on 20 March 1823 and at the same meeting elected Rafael Francisco Osejo as inaugural President. His rule was brief, as the 29 March a military coup led by the monarchist leader Joaquin Oreamuno y Muñoz de la Trinidad deposed the authorities and broke the constitutional order. Rafael Francisco Osejo was persecuted by monarchists and had to flee to San Jose.

== Political performance after independence ==
After the fall of the monarchy, and after some incidents, Rafael Francisco Osejo returned in July 1823 to take his seat in the Constituent Assembly, but his credentials as a deputy were canceled in August and he was imprisoned in the following month due to suspicions that members of the council had colluded with the monarchist coup-plotters. However, on 28 September, the court tasked with judging the monarchists absolved Osejo of all blame. In December 1825 he was elected as a judge of the Supreme Court of Costa Rica, but declined the position. In early 1828 he was the city attorney of San José and in 1828–1830 he was an MP for Ujarrás. He was the promoter of the so-called April Act, which separated Costa Rica from the Central American Federation from 1829 to 1831. From 1831 to 1833 he was an MP for Alajuela and during several months of 1831 served as President of the Legislative Assembly. He was one of the promoters of the idea of a regular rotation of the authorities, which materialized in 1834 with the controversial the Ambulance Act. Thanks to his efforts in 1832 the first law on compulsory primary education was issued. In August 1833 he was appointed State specific counter and in October of that year he was elected as a deputy judge of the Supreme Court of Costa Rica. In the following December, the Eastern Department of Costa Rica chose him as a deputy to the Central American Federal Congress, but in May 1834 his credentials were annulled. He later served as a federal deputy for Nueva Segovia (1835–1836) and León (1836–1837). In 1838 he was the Political Chief of San Salvador and in 1847 he was Nicaragua's Commissioner to Honduras.

== Works ==
He published Brief Lessons in Arithmetic and a Geography of Costa Rica.

== Death ==
He died around 1848, apparently in Comayagua, Honduras.

== See also ==
- Miguel de Bonilla y Laya-Bolívar
