= José María de Peralta =

Costa Rican politician

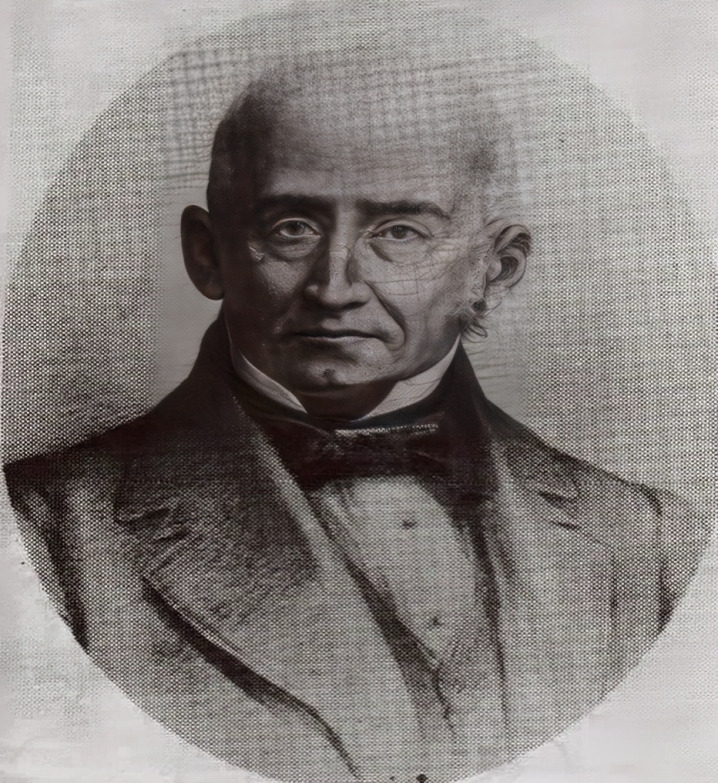

Syndico Procurato of Cartago

Provincial Mayor of the Santa Hermandad of Cartago

Mayor of Cartago

Superior Political Chief (Jefe Politico Superior)
- In office 1828-1831

Personal details
- Born: 28 September 1763 Jaén, Spain
- Died: 7 August 1836 (aged 72) Cartago, Costa Rica
- Spouse(s): Ana Benita Nava López del Corral; Ana Basilia de Alvarado y Oreamuno

José María de Peralta y de la Vega (28 September 1763 – 7 August 1836) was a Spanish-born Costa Rican politician. De la Vega served in a number of political positions including as mayor of the municipal government of Cartago, a member of the Junta Superior Gubernativa of Costa Rica, and member and president of Congress.

== Personal life ==
Peralta was born to Antonia de la Vega y Castañeda and José de Peralta y Barrios on 28 September 1763 in Jaén, Spain. Peralta first came to then-colonial Costa Rica in 1782 as a member of the entorauge of Bishop Esteban Lorenzo de Tristan of Nicaragua and Costa Rica. When Tristan returned, Peralta remained in Costa Rica.

Peralta married Ana Benita Nava López del Corral, the daughter of José Joaquín de Nava y Cabezudo (the governor then-province of Costa Rica), on 12 April 1783 in Cartago, Costa Rica. Ana Benita died on 11 March 1812. On 29 October 1816 the widowed Peralta married Ana Basilia de Alvarado y Oreamuno.

Peralta had a number of children including José Francisco de Peralta.

== Political career ==
In 1785, Peralta became Syndico Procurato of Cartago; two years later, he became the provincial mayor of the Santa Hermandad of Cartago. In 1808, Peralta served as the first mayor of Cartago.

In January of 1822, Peralta was elected to the Junta Superior Gubernativa which governed Costa Rica at the time.From 1828 to 1831, Peralta served as the Superior Political Chief (Jefe Politico Superior) of Costa Rica.

Peralta opposed the union of the Central American provinces to Mexico and is credited with influencing movements towards independence in Costa Rica.
