= Santa Tecla, El Salvador =

Santa Tecla
- District
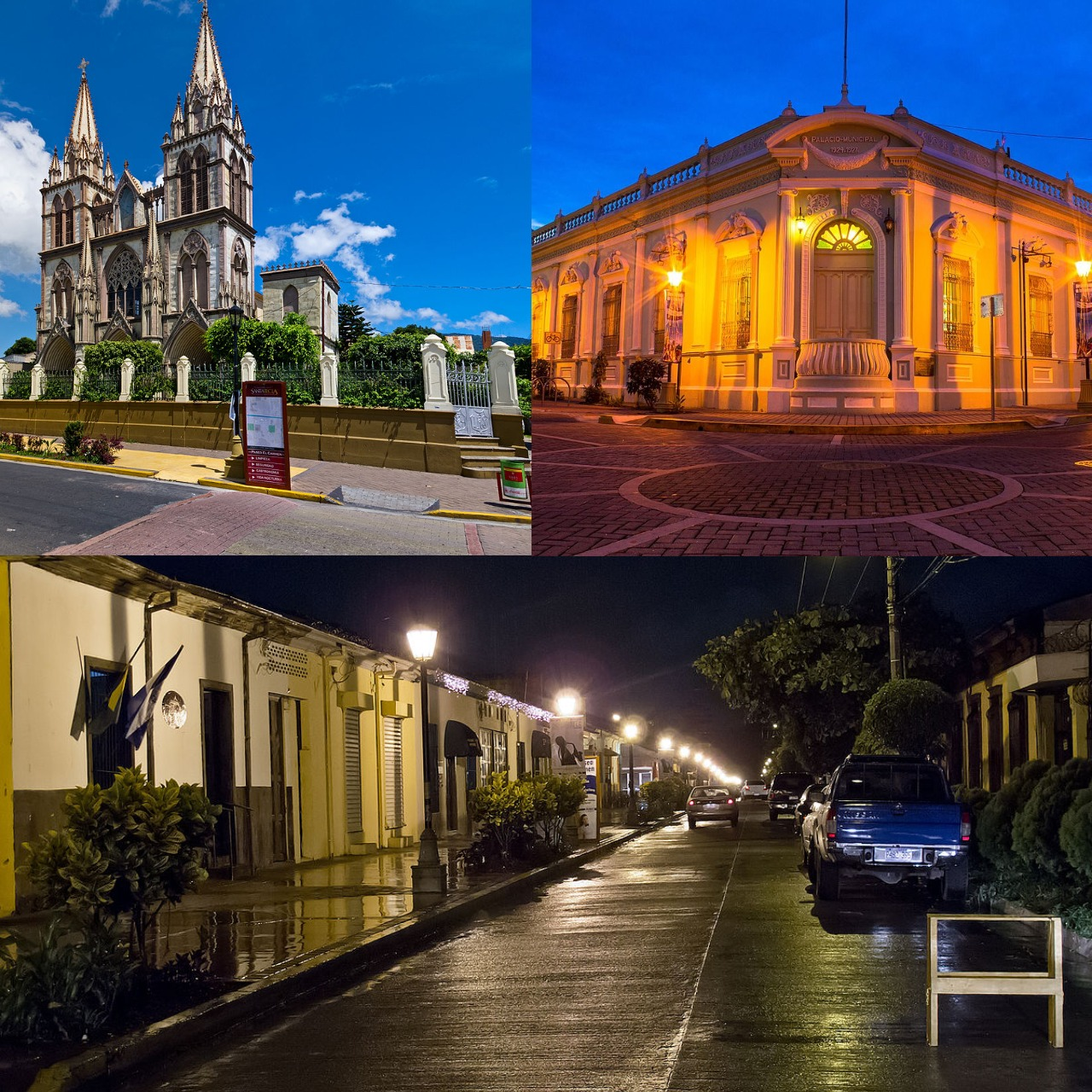
- From top, left to right: Iglesia El Carmen, Palacio Municipal de Santa Tecla, Paseo El Carmen.

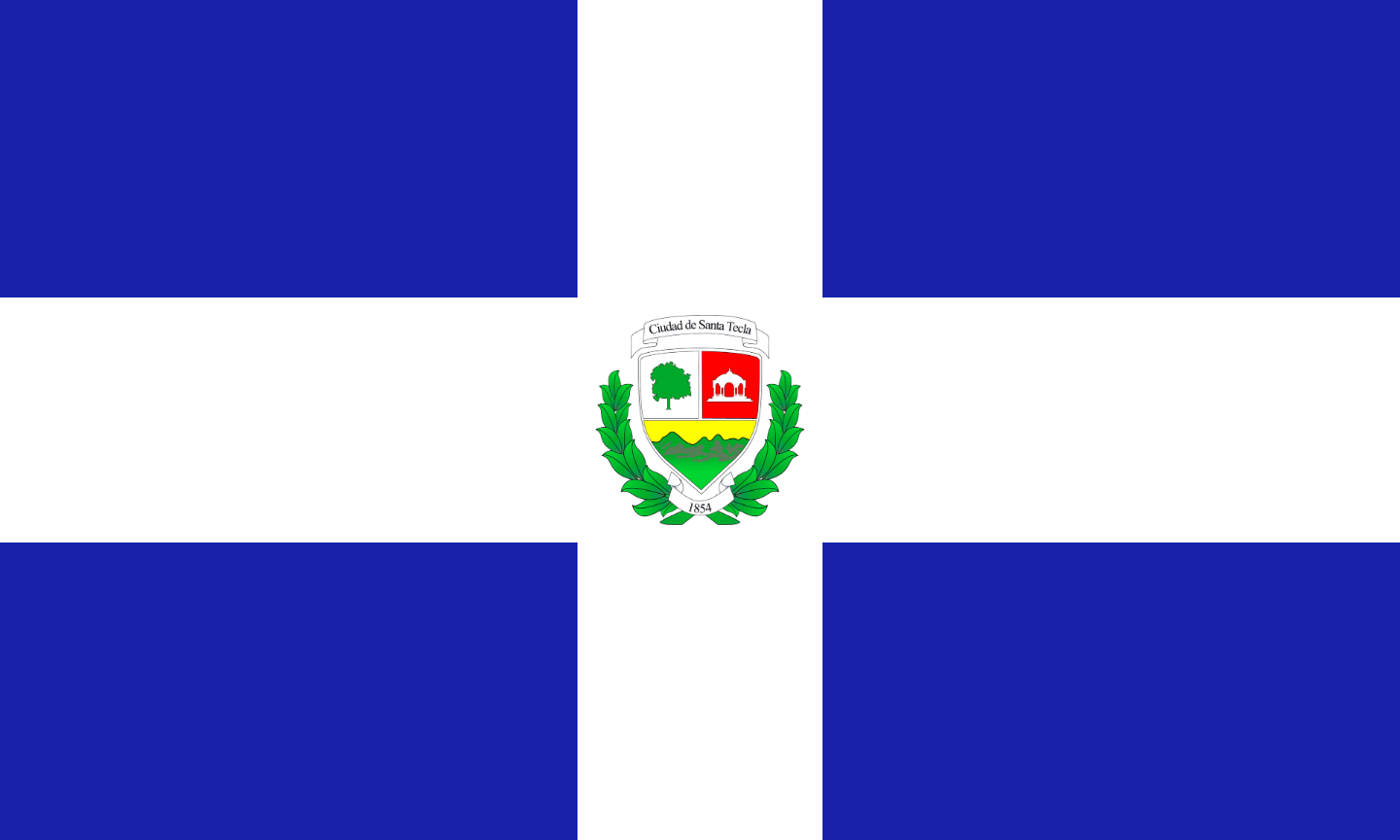
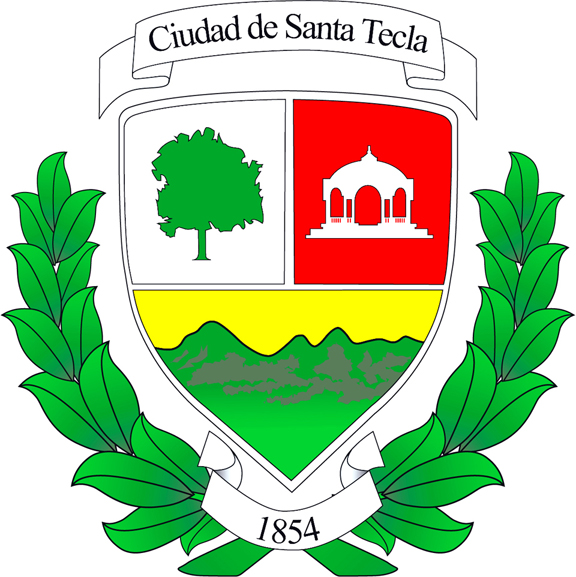
- Flag Coat of arms
- Nicknames: Tecla, Nueva San Salvador
- Motto: ¡Inseparable de Ti!
- Location within El Salvador
- Coordinates: 13°40′23″N 89°14′26″W
- Country: El Salvador
- Department: La Libertad
- Metro: San Salvador Metropolitan Area
- Town: 8 August 1854 as Nueva San Salvador
- City: 1 January 1856
- Department Capital: 21 January 1865
- Renamed as Santa Tecla: 1 January 2004

Government
  - Type: Democratic, Mayor-Council Municipality
  - Mayor: Henry Flores (Nuevas Ideas)

Area
  - District: 112.2 km^{2} (43.3 sq mi)
  - Urban: 9.0 km^{2} (3.5 sq mi)
- Elevation: 931 m (3,054 ft)

Population (2024)
  - District: 125,532
  - Estimate (2026): 127,393
  - Rank: 9th in El Salvador
  - Density: 1,119/km^{2} (2,898/sq mi)
  - Urban: 116,309
  - Urban density: 13,000/km^{2} (33,000/sq mi)
  - Rural: 9,223
- Time zone: UTC−6 (Central Standard Time)
- SV-LI: CP 1501
- Area code: + 503
- HDI (2007): 0.821 – very high
- Website: http://www.santatecladigital.gob.sv//

Santa Tecla (Spanish pronunciation: [ˈsanta ˈtekla]), formerly known as Nueva San Salvador ("New San Salvador"), is a city and a municipality in the La Libertad department of El Salvador. It is the capital of the department of La Libertad.

The city was named after Saint Thecla, a saint of the early Christian Church and a reported follower of Paul of Tarsus in the 1st century AD. She is not mentioned in the New Testament, but the earliest record of her comes from the apocryphal Acts of Paul and Thecla, probably composed in the early 2nd century.

Santa Tecla is situated at the southern foot of the San Salvador Volcano and is a part of the San Salvador metropolitan area. The municipality of Antiguo Cuscatlán sits on its eastern border.

== History ==
Santa Tecla was founded as "Nueva San Salvador" on 8 August 1854, by President José María San Martín after the capital city, San Salvador, was destroyed by an earthquake. By 1865, it had become the capital of the La Libertad Department. The continued development of the city was spurred by the success of the local coffee industry, through which Santa Tecla became a very productive commercial city.

In 2003, the city was renamed "Santa Tecla", which was the historical name of the region prior to the founding of the city. On the occasion of its 150th anniversary (1854–2004), two concerts were presented by the renowned tenor Fernando del Valle, great-great-grandson of Andrés del Valle, President of El Salvador in 1876, and a direct descendant of Colonel José María San Martín, President of El Salvador from 1854 to 1856. The tenor requested that the first concert take place on September 23, the feast day of the saint for whom the city is named.

The current mayor of Santa Tecla is Henry Flores of the Nuevas Ideas party. Until Flores' election, the Farabundo Martí National Liberation Front (FMLN) party had held the office in Santa Tecla for five consecutive terms.

=== Municipal government and information ===
In recent decades, Santa Tecla has received a major influx of new residents, which among other things has led to the invasion of the main streets by informal sector traders in search of livelihood. The most rapid urban growth and disorderliness occurred in the period between 1968 and 2000, when a series of natural disasters, particularly the 1986 earthquake that struck San Salvador, and a social civil war afflicted the region.

The urban extension to Santa Tecla disrupted the boundaries of the restricted nature areas established by the Metro Plan 80–2000 (which regulates land use and land-use planning in the municipalities of Greater San Salvador), producing a substantial environmental impact in the foothills of the San Salvador Volcano and in the Balsam Mountains.

That combination of factors led to the loss of human lives in the Colonia Las Colinas, a development authorized by the Central Government in restricted areas of the Cordillera del Balsamo, during the earthquakes of January and February 2001. The disaster convinced the municipal government of the need for better urban planning and for participation of the citizenry. In this context, in 2002 the City Council, led by Mayor Oscar Ortiz, began the new participatory strategic planning process concluding with the Participatory Strategic Plan (PEP) of Santa Tecla for the period 2002 to 2012.

== Territorial divisions of Santa Tecla ==
=== Municipal Division ===
Santa Tecla is divided into five districts, each with their own cantons, neighborhoods, and communities:

- District 1:
  - Residencial Acovit
  - Residencial Girasoles
  - Reparto El Quequeisque
  - Colonia Quezaltepec
  - Residencial Alpes Suizos 1
  - Residencial Alpes Suizos 2
  - Residencial Europa
  - Lotificación Monteverde
  - Colonia Nuevo Amanecer
  - Colonia Don Bosco
  - Colonia Las Delicias
  - Residencial Pinares de Suiza
  - Comunidad Guadalupe 1 y 2
  - Cantón Victoria
- District 2:
  - Colonia Buena Vista
  - Colonia Cumbres de Santa Tecla
  - Residencial San Antonio
  - Residencial Casa Bella
  - Residencial Casa Verde 1
  - Urbanización Hacienda San José
  - Urbanización Brisas de Santa Tecla
  - Parque Residencial Villas de Francia 1
  - Residencial Altos de Santa Mónica
  - Residencial Montesión
  - Residencial Pinares de Santa Mónica
  - Parque Residencial Villas de Francia 2
  - Colonia Jardines del Rey
  - Comunidad Las Margaritas
  - Colonia Santa Mónica
  - Colonia Santa Teresa
  - Comunidad Nueva Esperanza
  - Residencial Los Cipreses 1, 2, 3 y La Colina
  - Comunidad El Progreso
  - Comunidad El Tanque
  - Urbanización San Antonio Las Palmeras
  - Colonia Las Palmeras
  - Residencial San Rafael
  - Residencial Peña Blanca
- District 3:
  - Bosques de Santa Teresa
  - Finca de Asturias Norte
  - Finca de Asturias Sur
  - Joyas de la Montaña
  - La Montaña 1
  - La Montaña 2
  - Paso Fresco
  - Jardines de La Sabana 1, 2 y 3
  - Jardines de Merliot
  - Jardines del Volcán 1, 2, 3 y 4
  - Comunidad El Rosal
  - Residencial Maya
  - Jardines de la Libertad
  - Jardines de Merliot
  - Comunidad El Trébol
  - Residencial Miraflores
  - Residencial Británica
  - Cantón Álvarez
  - Cantón El Progreso
- District 4:
  - 8° Calle
  - 4° Calle
  - 3° Calle Entre 16° Y 7° Av.
  - 1° Calle Entre 16° Y 7° Av.
  - 6° Calle
  - Calle Daniel Hernández
  - 2° Calle
  - Calle José Ciriaco López
  - 7° Calle (Entre 2° Y 4° Av.)
  - 5° Calle (Entre 2° Y 4° Av.)
  - 9° Calle (Entre 2° Y 4° Av.)
  - 6° Calle
  - 10° Calle
  - 14° Calle
  - 12° Calle
  - Comunidad María Victoria
  - Residencial El Paraíso
  - Residencial Las Colinas 1
  - Residencial Cima del Paraíso
  - Comunidad El Paraíso
  - Comunidad San Martin
  - Urbanización Alemania
  - Colonia Residencial El Paraíso
  - Residencial Las Gardenias
  - Comunidad El Carmencito
  - Comunidad Nueva Esperanza
  - Residencial Altos de Utila 1
  - Residencial Altos de Utila 2
  - Residencial Altos de Utila 3
  - Residencial Bethania
  - Residencial Las Piletas
  - Residencial Utila Place
  - Quinta Residencial Las Piletas
  - Urbanización Villa Bosque
  - Urbanización Palmira
  - Parque Residencial Primavera 1 y 2
  - Colonia San José del Pino
  - Comunidad San Rafael
  - Comunidad Fátima
  - Comunidad La Cruz del Refugio
  - Residencial Alturas De Tenerife
  - Los Arrecifes
- District 5:
  - Cantón Ayagualo
  - Cantón Las Granadillas
  - Cantón El Triunfo
  - Cantón El Limón
  - Cantón El Matazano
  - Cantón Sacazil
  - Cantón Los Pajales
  - Comunidad Santa Marta
  - Comunidad Altos del Matazano

=== Rural zone of Santa Tecla ===
Santa Tecla has a rural zone with 12 cantons:

- Álvarez
- Ayagualo
- El Limón
- El Matazano
- El Progreso
- El Triunfo
- Las Granadillas
- Loma Larga
- Los Pajales
- Sacazil
- Victoria

== Demographics ==
The population of Santa Tecla is mostly mixed. Most inhabitants of the city of Santa Tecla are internal migrants from other departments of El Salvador, mainly Santa Ana and Chalatenango.

92% of the population lives in urban areas tecleña, making Santa Tecla one of the most urbanized cities in the country. In addition, 8% of the population lives in marginalized communities. Santa Tecla has an unemployment rate of 5.1%. 31% of the population owns a vehicle, while 19% have two or more vehicles. Most homes have the servicios tecleños basic water and sewer, electric power, telephone and garbage collection.

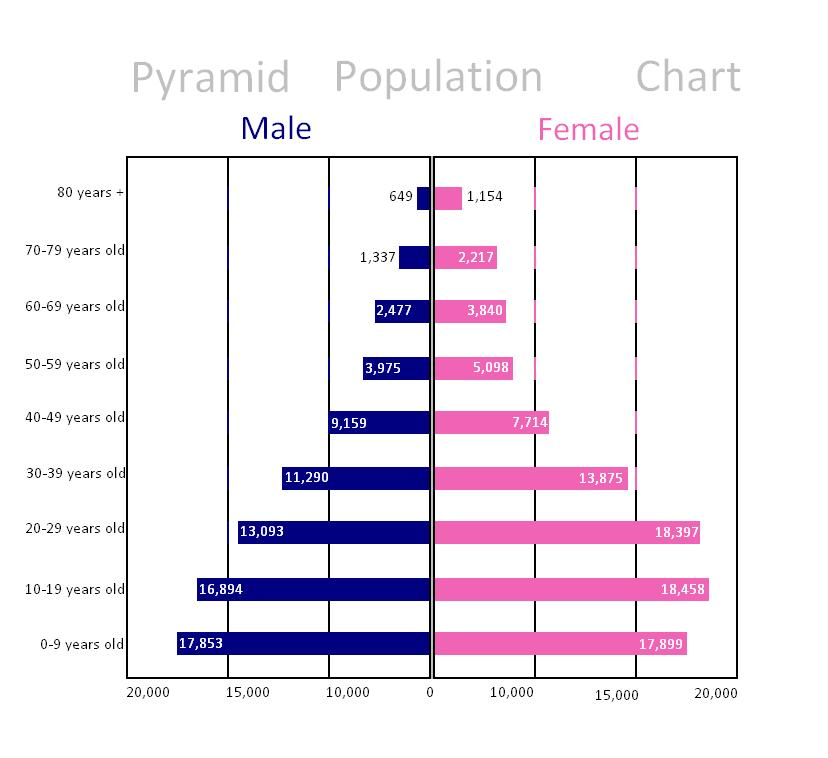
Santa Tecla population and age chart

Data	Figures
Human Development Index	0.955
Life Expectancy	87.0
Literacy Rate (15 years or older)	96.4%
Rate of School Enrollment	91 98.4%
Per Capita GDP	USD $30,203
Access to Running Water	89.4%
Unemployment Rate	5.1% (3.7% male, 6.2% female)
Population living under poverty (less than $1.25 a day)	5.2%

== Geography ==
The municipal district of Santa Tecla is bordered by the following municipalities: Colón, San Juan Opico, Quezaltepeque and Nejapa to the north; San Salvador, Antiguo Cuscatlán, Nuevo Cuscatlán, San José Villanueva, and Zaragoza to the east; La Libertad to the south; and Talnique and Comasagua to the west. It is located between the geographic coordinates 13°44'47" N (northern end) and 13°32'22" N (southern end), 89°15'45" W (eastern end) and 89°23'58" W (far west).

=== Soil and terrain ===
Pyroclastic materials abound, including andesitic and basaltic lavas, volcanic detrital sediments with pyroclastic material, and lava flows intercalated with dacite lavas and andesitic and basaltic lava flows. The most notable terrain features in the town are the San Salvador Volcano or Quezaltepec; the hills of Los Angeles, El Volador, Los Amates, El Convento, La Virgen or Elephant; the hills Los Cedros, Miralvalle, Los Mangos, El Zapote, Las Pools, La Mira, Santa Teresa, Pena Blanca, Long, El Combo, La Papaya, Guadalupe, El Amate, Alicante, El Sacazil, San Juan, El Manzano, The Pantheon, El Convento, El Dorado, The Bullocks, Three Ceibas, the Campo Santo, Las Canoas and the Pulpit in Santa Elena, El Bosque or El Cedral, El Potrero, Los plums, The Franchona, Santa Emilia, El Triunfo, Brazil, Spiders, Santa Elisa, Los Pajales and the Chichipate. The volcano of San Salvador or Quezaltepec is located 11.4 kilometres (7.1 mi) north of the city of Santa Tecla, with an elevation of 1,893.39 metres (6,211.9 ft) above sea level at the highest edge of the crater. The main hills are Amates, located 7.5 kilometers west of Santa Tecla, with an elevation of 1,036 meters above sea level, the Virgin or Elephant, located 18.3 kilometres (11.4 mi) west of town with an elevation of 1,011 metres (3,317 ft) above sea level, and El Volador, located 6.3 kilometers southwest of the city, with an elevation of 790 meters above sea level.

As is the case for many regions of El Salvador, the makeup of Santa Tecla's terrain and its many natural springs makes the area prone to landslides. As mentioned above, much of the terrain is composed of pyroclastic materials with low permeability. Pore water pressure or pore air pressure are unable to dissipate fast enough; the subsequent loss of stability triggers landsliding. This is especially true during seismic activity, for instance during the January 2001 and February 2001 El Salvador earthquakes.

== Landmarks and buildings ==
=== Historic buildings ===
==== Santa Tecla Museum (MUTE) ====
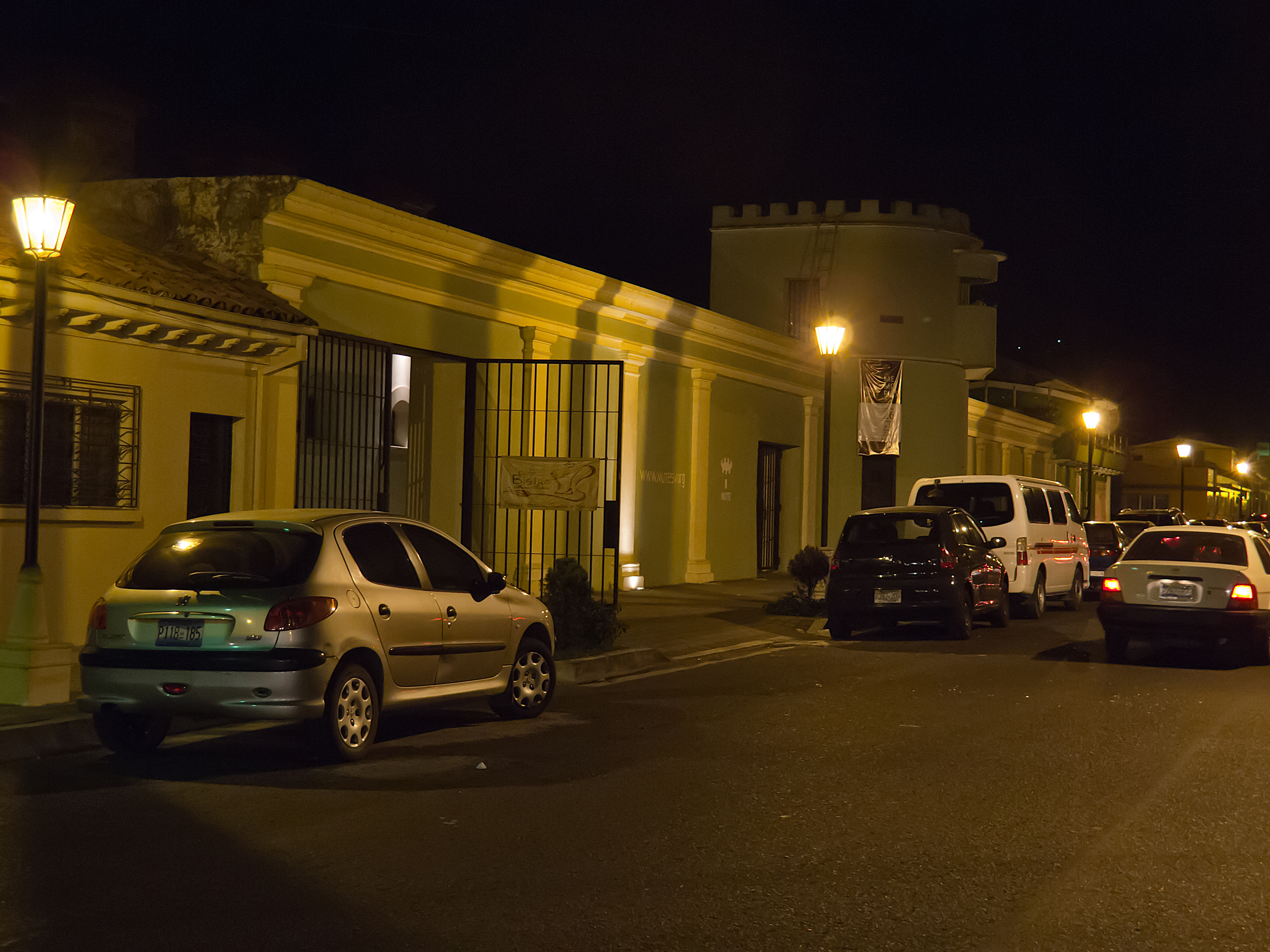
Santa Tecla Museum (MUTE)

The MUTE's neoclassical building was originally designed and built as a prison in 1902 by architect José Jeréz, who also designed most of Santa Tecla's landmarks. The highlight of the building is the main tower, which once served as an office for the mayor of the city. The building was made from various materials including clay brick of volcanic origin. The original prison had four major cells to house 15 inmates each; however, records show that up to 40 inmates were held in each of the cells. In addition, the prison had six small punishment cells and four additional rooms, two for the kitchen and two for special punishment prisoners, one of them named "the little one", where no sound or light could be heard or seen. Visitors today may experience the coldness of this room and other interesting attractions at MUTE.

==== Santa Tecla Municipal Palace ====
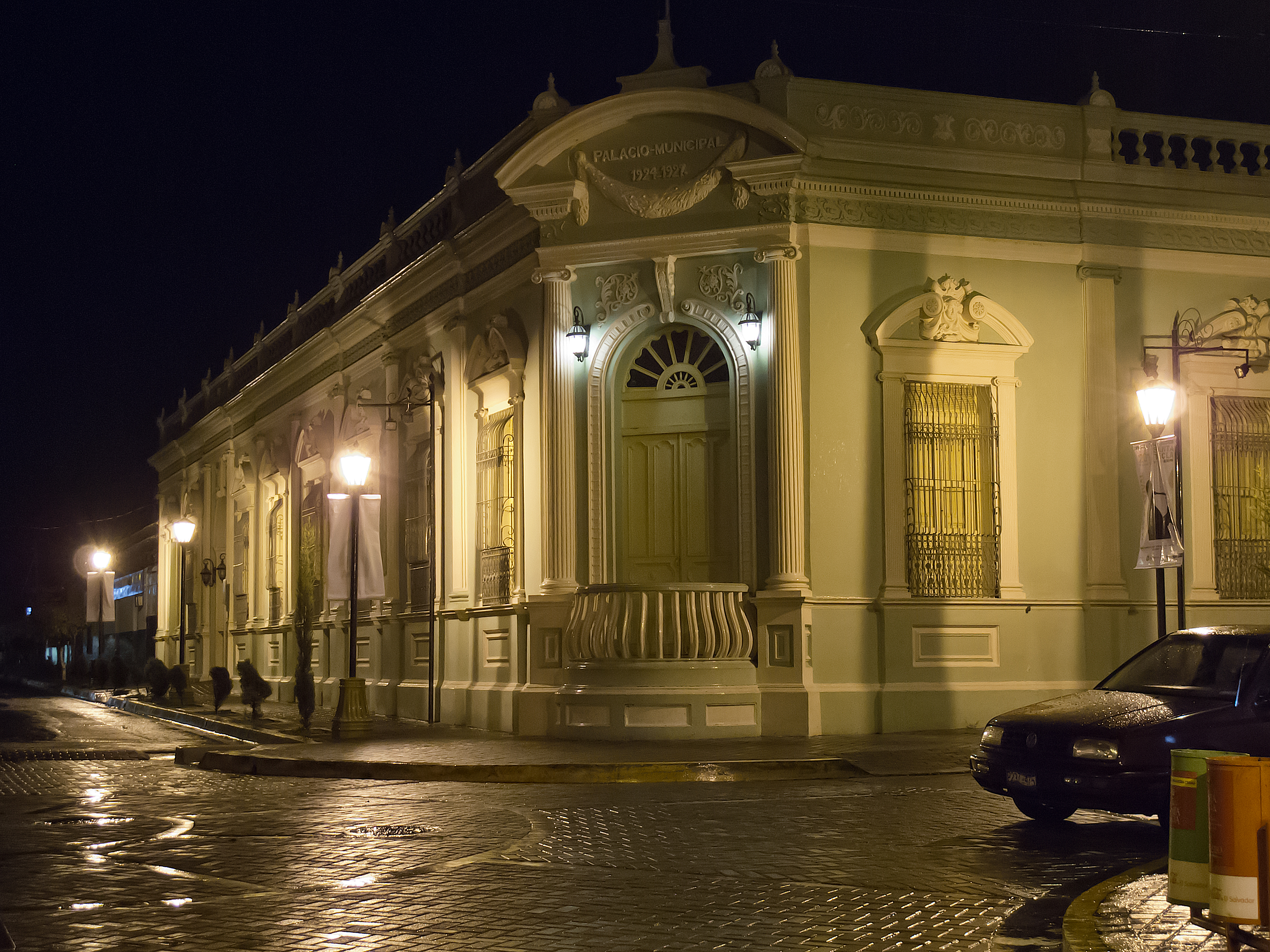
Santa Tecla Municipal Palace

Santa Tecla has many examples of neoclassical architecture. One of them is the Palace of Fine Arts (Santa Tecla Municipal Palace). It is estimated that this building was built in 1911 for residential purposes. Later the property was sold to the municipality as a way to cancel a debt, and the building became the offices of the municipal council. Considered a Santa Tecla landmark, this eclectic building with 17 rooms, imposing columns and a central courtyard reflects several architectural styles, among them neo-Gothic, neo-romantic, neo-Renaissance and neo-vicentine. It is assumed that much of the infrastructure in Santa Tecla's early years is the work of architect José Jeréz, who is responsible for this Municipal Palace and several other buildings like Hogar del Niño Adalberto Guirola, El Carmen Church, the Guirola House, and the former Santa Tecla Penitentiary (now the MUTE museum). Over the years, this building has deteriorated due to weather and natural disasters. In January 2001 a major earthquake struck El Salvador, seriously damaging the building. However, with the help of the Government of Andalucía in Spain, the municipality began restoration work to preserve this architectural masterpiece. In October 2008 the work was concluded and the building became the Municipal Palace of Fine Arts in order to establish an artistic home for children, youth and adults.

==== El Carmen Cathedral ====
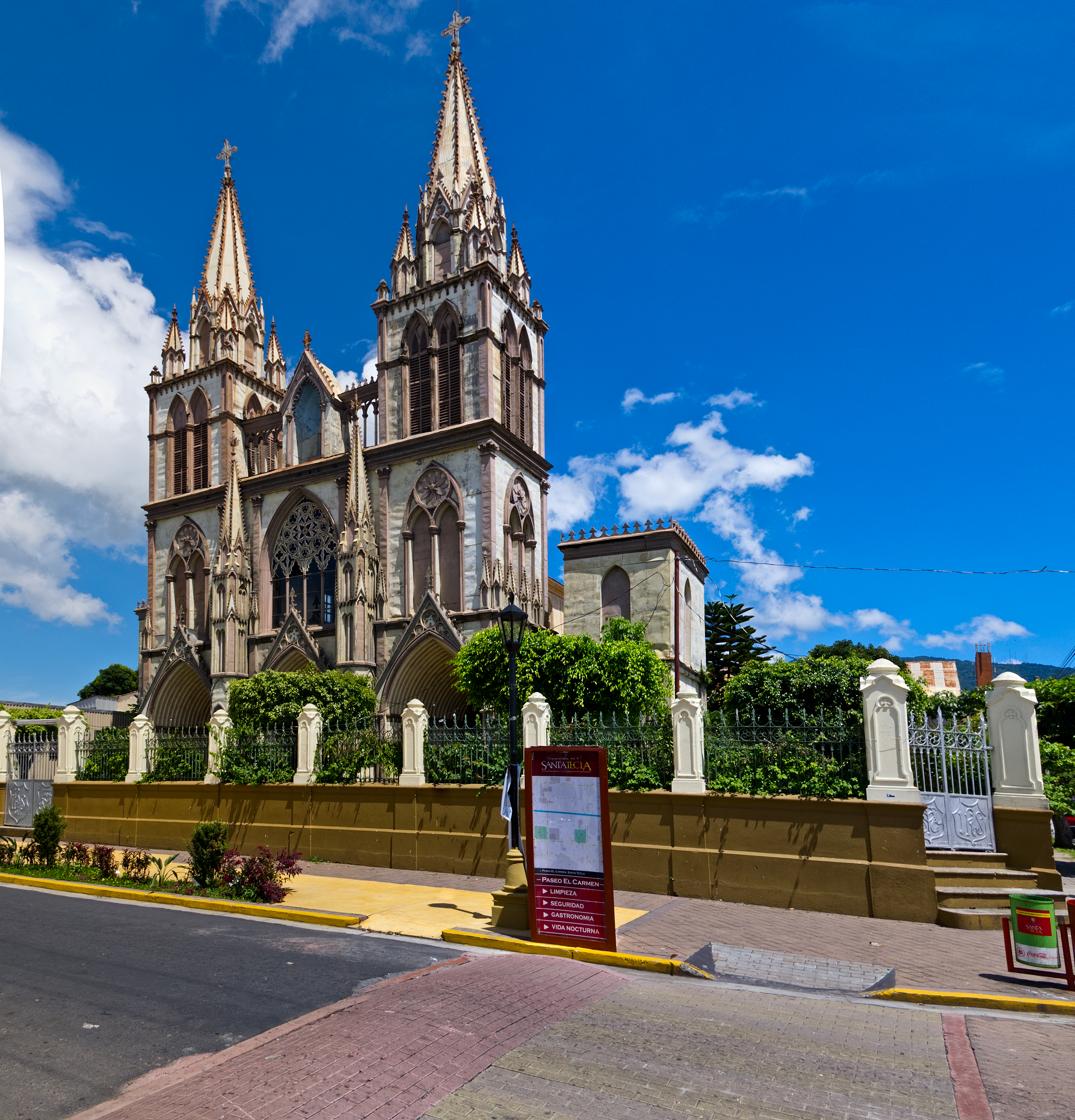
Cathedral del Nuestra Señora del Carmen in downtown Santa Tecla

Santa Tecla is home to the church Iglesia El Carmen, an architectural relic of the nineteenth century. This temple was erected between 1856 and 1914. It has a characteristic neo-Gothic style with structures carved in wood and walls made of brick and talpetate (material made from volcanic ash).

It houses three stunning historical bells that echoed throughout Santa Tecla, each with its own name (appointed on behalf of the contributors to the temple): Carmela, forged in 1908, "La Chaleca", made in 1918, and "Corazón", made in 1923.

The 2001 earthquakes seriously damaged the structure. The church was given an uninhabitable status by experts.

=== Parks and plazas ===
==== Daniel Hernandez Town Square ====
Located along the Pan-American Highway in downtown Santa Tecla, Daniel Hernández is a place to relax and enjoy the city's history.

Some of the highlights to be found within the square include:

A monument to the memory of Daniel Hernández, a teacher who at the early age of fifteen was considered an expert on subjects as diverse as mathematics, geography, astronomy and chemistry. Hernández also contributed to the foundation and design of the streets of Villa Santa Tecla, which at the time was meant to be the new capital of El Salvador. Hernández promoted community development projects such as the installation of water services and the first illuminated plaza in the city; he was also one of the founders of San Rafael Hospital (located on the outskirts of Santa Tecla). On 16 July 1896, Hernández died in the city he helped to build.

==== José María San Martín Town Square ====
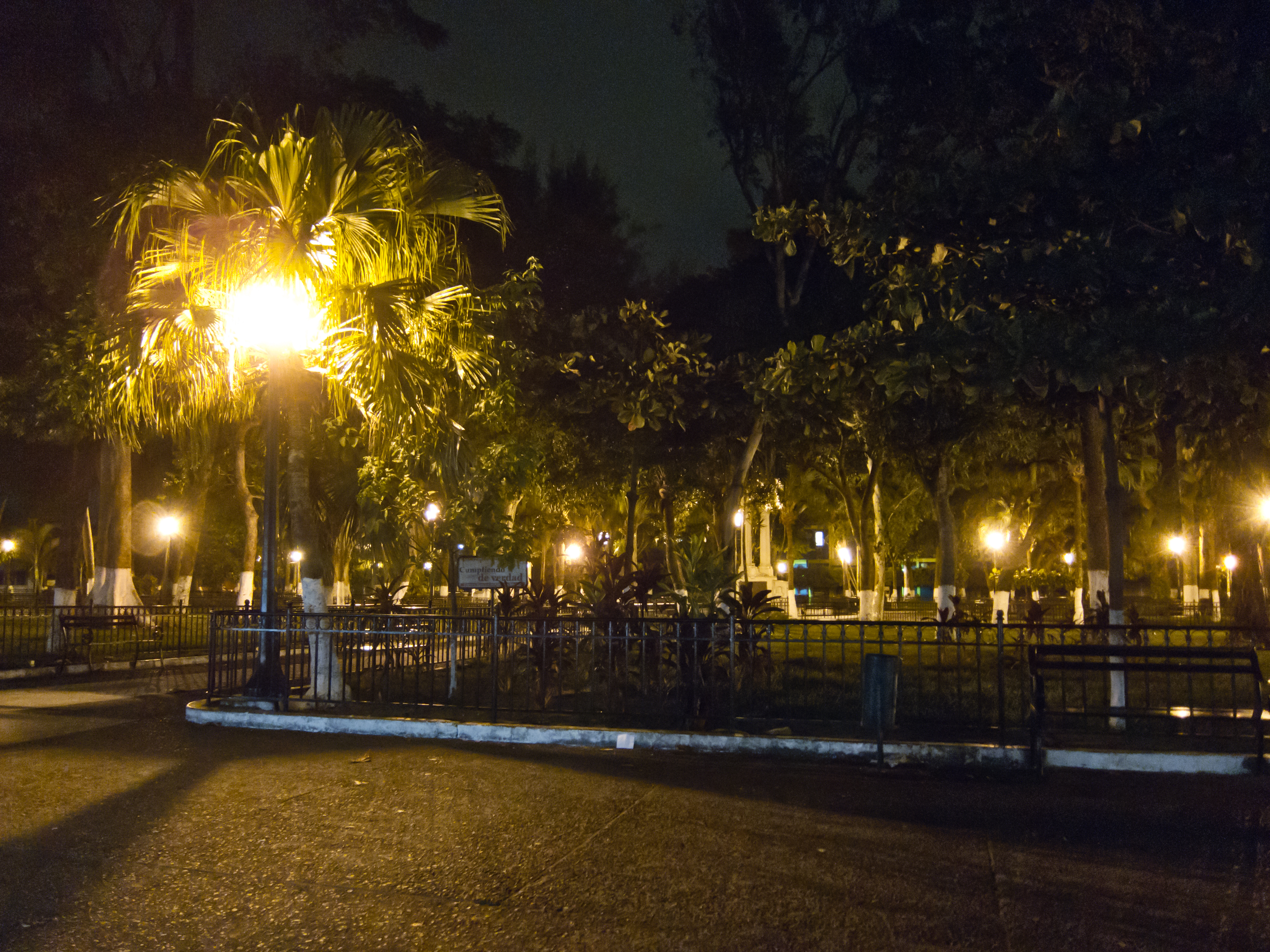
José San Martin Park

The city of Santa Tecla, formerly known as "Nueva San Salvador", was the temporary capital of El Salvador in the mid-nineteenth century. This left behind many historic buildings and landmarks, including two historic town squares within its historical center: José María San Martín and Daniel Hernández.

The first one is located on Calle Daniel Hernández, better known as the Pan-American Highway. This plaza is the scene of a monument in honor of former president José María San Martín, who issued a decree authorizing the establishment of the city under the name of Nueva San Salvador on 8 August 1854.

In April 1854 a devastating earthquake caused extensive damage to San Salvador, capital of the country. It was decided to move the government to the city of Cojutepeque, in the Cuscatlán Department, and later it was moved to a "new" city: "Nueva San Salvador", in a valley less vulnerable to earthquakes, on a farm known as Santa Tecla. San Martín was president of the country at the time; among his achievements was the creation of the Department of Chalatenango in 1855. He also instructed the lawyer Isidro Menéndez to issue several laws for the country. San Martín died in 1857.

== Tourism and sites of interest ==
=== Shopping ===
==== Plaza Merliot ====
Located at 17th Avenue North and Chiltiupan Street, Plaza Merliot was built by the Salvadoran construction company Grupo Agrisal in 1994. It became the first mall ever to be built in the city of Santa Tecla, and the third one to be built in the Metropolitan Area of San Salvador. Although many people in Santa Tecla go to the Antiguo Cuscatlán shopping district, which is the current shopping hotspot of the metropolitan area, consisting of three shopping malls and eight shopping centers, restaurants, communications, hotels, and business parks, Plaza Merliot continues to be preferred by the people of Santa Tecla. Plaza Merliot is made up of three levels, and a central plaza where the food court is at.

=== Natural tourism ===
==== Ecoparque El Espino ====
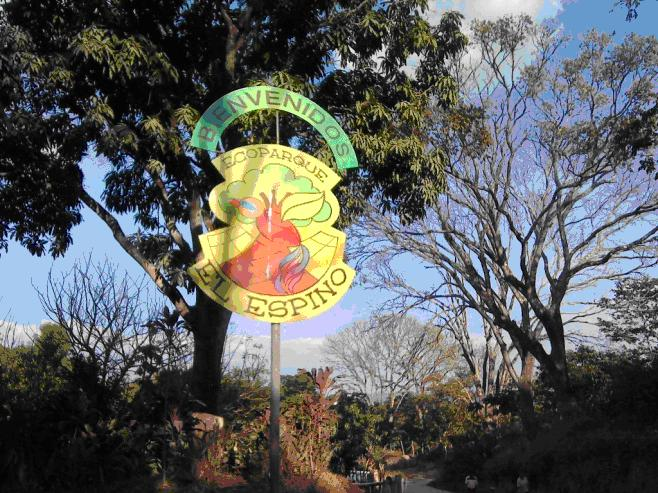
Entrance to the Ecoparque El Espino

Ecoparque El Espino is located in the villa of the same name in the foothills of Boqueron (San Salvador) Volcano, just 5.1 km north of Santa Tecla's downtown area. Visitors enjoy the natural environment of pine trees, coffee trees, cypresses and flowers of various colors that adorn this 35-hectare park, which is constantly monitored by rangers of the cooperative that administers the site. There are many activities to do in Ecoparque El Espino. One of them is mountain biking. You can purchase a membership for US$20 a month with unlimited access to the Eco Park and all of its trails. The park has three hiking trails that you can travel in an average of 45 minutes each. They pass through a forest made up of massive 200-year-old trees and luscious forest. There is also a hanging 24-meter-long bridge. Many local birds like clarineros, toucans, chachas (wild chickens), tinamous and magpies inhabit the area. There are also wild animals like kinkajous, armadillos (locally known as cuzucos), rabbits, Central American agoutis, and many others. Another attraction is the site called El Infiernillo ("the little hell"), a small area of land where steam emanates deep from the depths of the earth. The park monitors this volcanic activity with the help of high-tech equipment donated by the Spanish International Cooperation Agency (AECI) in 2004 for purposes of education and scientific research. At the end of the 45-minute walk there is an outlook, whose height is 1,233 meters above sea level. There you will find a spectacular panoramic view of the capital city metropolitan area that contrasts with the green of the Cordillera del Balsamo.

==== Los Chorros ====
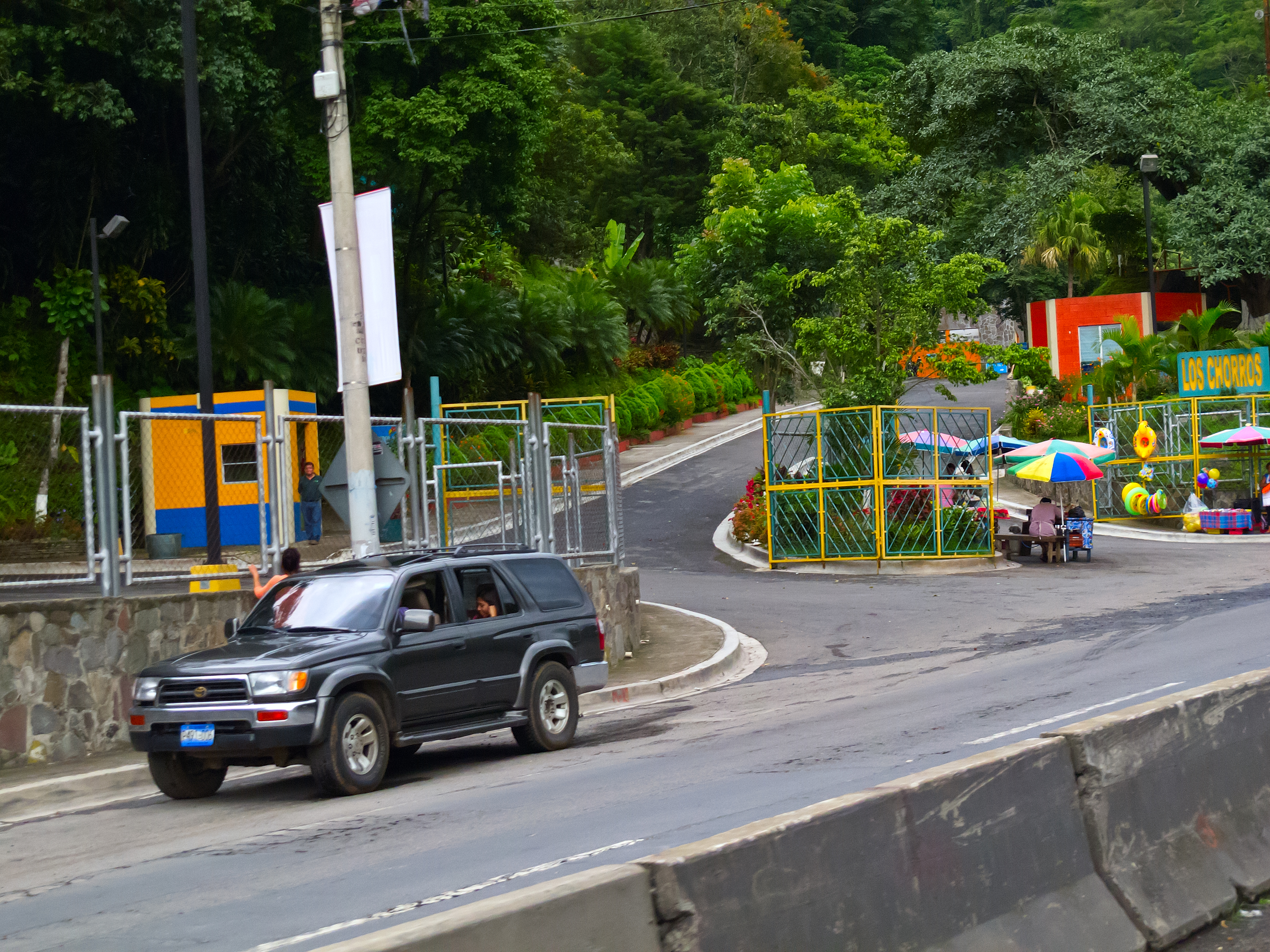
Entrance to Los Chorros

Just 5.7 kilometers west of Santa Tecla lies a natural oasis, a tourist icon visited by many national and international tourists. It is made up of 12 acres of land: four of them are entitled for public use, the other acres are part of a nature preservation area. This park has a large number of water springs coming down from San Salvador volcano. There are four pools: one for children, one with slides and the other two designed to integrate them with the natural uniqueness of the location. This tourist center opened in 1952, thanks to the vision of Salvadoran poet Raul Contreras, who wanted his remains buried at the park. The land where the park is located belonged to the Soundy family, who sold the property to the Salvadoran Institute of Tourism in 1956. This park has held important international events, including the Miss Universe pageant in 1975, due to the impressive landscape. In 2001 the facilities were severely damaged by the earthquakes. But its reconstruction was done shortly after the natural disaster. In this park you will find children's play areas, an amphitheater for educational and cultural events, picnic areas, a footbridge, access ramps for people with disabilities and trails into the forest.

==== Boqueron (San Salvador) Volcano ====
Located on top of San Salvador Volcano at 1,800 m and just 13.6 kilometers from Downtown Santa Tecla, this park's main attraction is a large crater 5 kilometers in diameter and 558 meters deep. El Boquerón enjoys a cool climate year-round. The park offers many walking trails through pine trees and other plants cultivated at the site. Among the plant species identified are ornamentals such as "cartuchos", hydrangeas, begonias and wild "sultanas". There is wildlife such as armadillos, raccoons, deer, and foxes, among others. Guide companies such as the Tourism Police (POLITUR) offer guided hikes down to "El Boqueroncito" inside the large crater, with views of the "Picacho", the highest point of the volcano, which is an excellent place for mountain biking. El Boquerón's last eruption took place in 1917, causing extensive damage to San Salvador and other towns such as Nejapa and Quezaltepeque, where large amounts of lava can still be seen at El Playón, outside the city. Recently the road to the Volcano has been developed in an effort to expand tourism in the surrounding areas. Several restaurants, coffee shops and other recreational activities have opened in recent years.

== Education ==
There are 104 school centers in the municipality, of which 34 are public and 70 are private schools. By the beginning of 2001, there were 16,918 students enrolled in the Santa Tecla public school district, of which 2,072 were in kindergarten, 12,979 enrolled between the grades 1st through 9th, and 1,867 in 1st and 2nd Bachelor Year. There were a total of 8,332 male students and 8,586 female students enrolled. The total number of citizens in Santa Tecla (aged from 5 to 19) was 53,228 in 2001, thus the public school district covers approximately 46.2% of the student population.

On the other hand, there are far more private schools than public, but they only cover 42.2% of the student population. Among the most expensive private schools in the municipality is the Cuscatlán British Academy, known as ABC in its Spanish acronym, which offers all classes in English and has adopted the school calendar of Great Britain. There is also the Lycée Français de San Salvador ("French Lyceum of San Salvador"), a school that offers all classes in French and has adapted the French school year. There are many other private institutions located on the northern side of the historic downtown of Santa Tecla, and many private Catholic institutions as well. One of the best known is the Lamatepec School, a bilingual Catholic school for boys only, and the Floresta, a bilingual Catholic school for girls only. Other schools and educational institutions renowned in Santa Tecla include Saint Cecilia Salesian School, St. Agnes School, Champagnat School, Belén School, Our Lady of the Rosary of Fátima School, Bethania School, French School (French-Spanish), and the British Academy (British English).

This leaves 8.6% of the youth (ages 5 to 19) under the categories of home-schooled or not attending school at all for various reasons, among the top of which is poverty. Officially out of the student population only 0.17% are registered as home-schooled, the other 8.43% are children who are not attending either a private or a public institution, mainly due to rural poverty factors, and others.

Santa Tecla is home to the first Salesian Institute to be founded in Central America, Saint Cecilia Salesian School (1899), which remains one of the most prestigious schools in El Salvador. Later arrived the Sisters of Mary Help of Christians, who established the Colegio Santa Inés in 1906; the Colegio Belén, established in 1916 by the Carmelite Sisters of Saint Joseph; the Colegio Champagnat, a Marist school established in 1925; and the Bethania Institute, established in 1928. Other important schools are the Colegio Nuestra Señora del Rosario de Fátima and Escuela Alberto Masferrer, both operated by the Dominican Sisters of the Annunciation of the Blessed Virgin.

Santa Tecla also offers higher institutes of education such as various universities. The most known and expensive university in the municipality is the Higher School of Economy and Business, known as ESEN for its Spanish acronym. The institution is fairly new, owned and constructed by Ricardo Poma, owner of Grupo Roble, one of the top businesses in the country. Another top university is the Communications University Monica Herrera, which offers degrees in strategic design, marketing, and integrated communications.

== Sister cities ==
- Nesodden, Norway

== See also ==
- Concepción de Ataco
- San Salvador Department
