= Jayaque =

- District
- Location in El Salvador
- Coordinates: 13°40′N 89°26′W
- Country: El Salvador
- Department: La Libertad
- Elevation: 3,274 ft (998 m)

Population (2024)
  - District: 16,391
  - Estimate (2026): 15,454
  - Rank: 85th in El Salvador
  - Urban: 10,776
  - Rural: 5,615

Jayaque is a municipality in the La Libertad department of El Salvador. According to the 2007 census, Jayaque had a population of 11,058. The official population projection for 2021 is of 15,039.

Jayaque covers an area of approximately 18.5 square miles (48 km^{2}) and has an altitude of 3,215 feet (980 m) at its highest elevation. The Nahuatl place-name Jayaque, Shaycat or Xayacatepeque, translates to "Hill of the masked" or "Hill of the masks or of the enamored ones."

== History ==
According to 21st century municipal records, the settlers of this site occupied the territory of Opico, but left the site due to "several plagues" at the beginning of the 18th century. In 1770, according to Pedro Cortés y Larraz, the village was home to 578 people. It has been a part of the Department of La Libertad since 28 January 1865, and was officially designated a city 18 May 1926.

In the 1960s and 70s, Jayaque was a vibrant town that served as the financial and educational center for all the other towns in the region. With the advent of political problems in the 1980s, the town lost its preeminence and became a more passive participant in the area's social, political and economic activities. It was not as significantly impacted by the Salvadoran Civil War of 1979-92 as other communities in El Salvador and as a result, many people from more war-torn areas migrated to Jayaque and the surrounding areas. This wave of migrants brought with it violence and instability; gang violence continues to affect the area into the 21st century.

== General Information ==
Jayaque has traditionally based its economy on coffee production. The town is surrounded by coffee plantations, and there are a number of coffee production facilities in these plantations where fresh coffee is processed and beans are made ready for export.

As is true across El Salvador, most of Jayaque's residents are Catholic. Celebrations are held every year in July to honor Jayaque's patron saint, Saint Christopher. Together with their nearby sister community of Cuisnahuat and the residents of Tepecoyo, the people of Jayaque celebrate the Festival of "Los Cumpas" (a colloquialism designated to represent the companionship between sister cities). Some Protestant churches have also been established, however, with the most significant growth of Protestantism occurring during and after the civil war.

The Lutheran Church, very small in El Salvador, has churches in Jayaque and in the nearby community of Dos de Mayo, which is officially a part of Jayaque. These churches are sponsored by the Lutheran Church of Penzberg, Bavaria, Germany as well as through relationships with churches in the Greater Milwaukee Synod of the Evangelical Lutheran Church in America, in southeast Wisconsin, USA. For many years, the pastors of the churches in Jayaque (Pan de Vida ILS) and Dos de Mayo (Montes de Penzberg ILS) were Francisco and Jesus Carrillo. The Carrillos were murdered 4 November 2006 just outside the church in Dos de Mayo after leading worship service there, and are considered by many to be martyrs. Investigation into the murders was discontinued in 2008 due to concerns the investigation itself might be contributing to additional violence. Gang violence and politically motivated assassination are plausible theories. Pastor Blanca Irma Rodriguez was called to replace the Carrillos following their assassination.

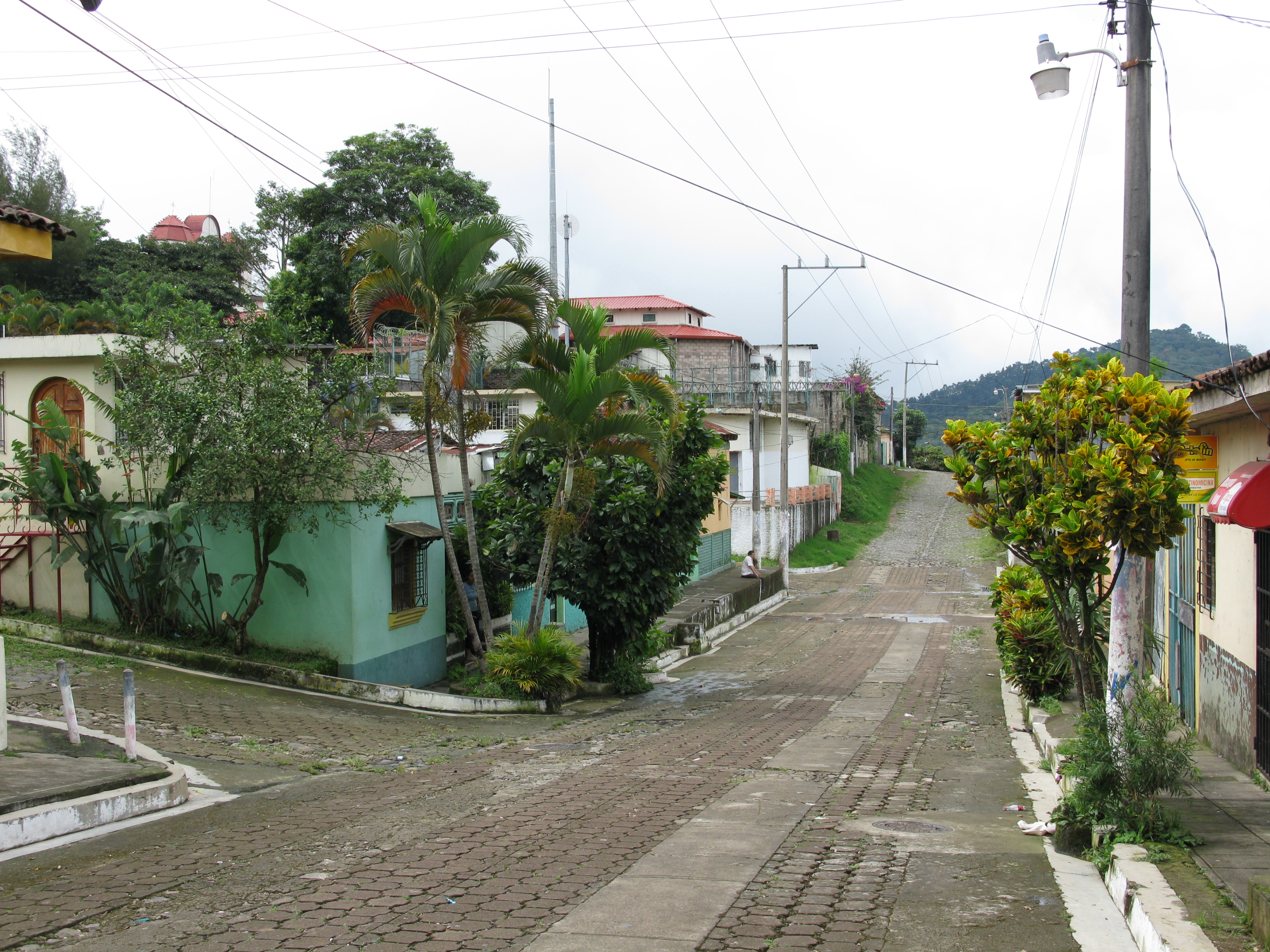
View of city streets in Jayaque, La Libertad, El Salvador

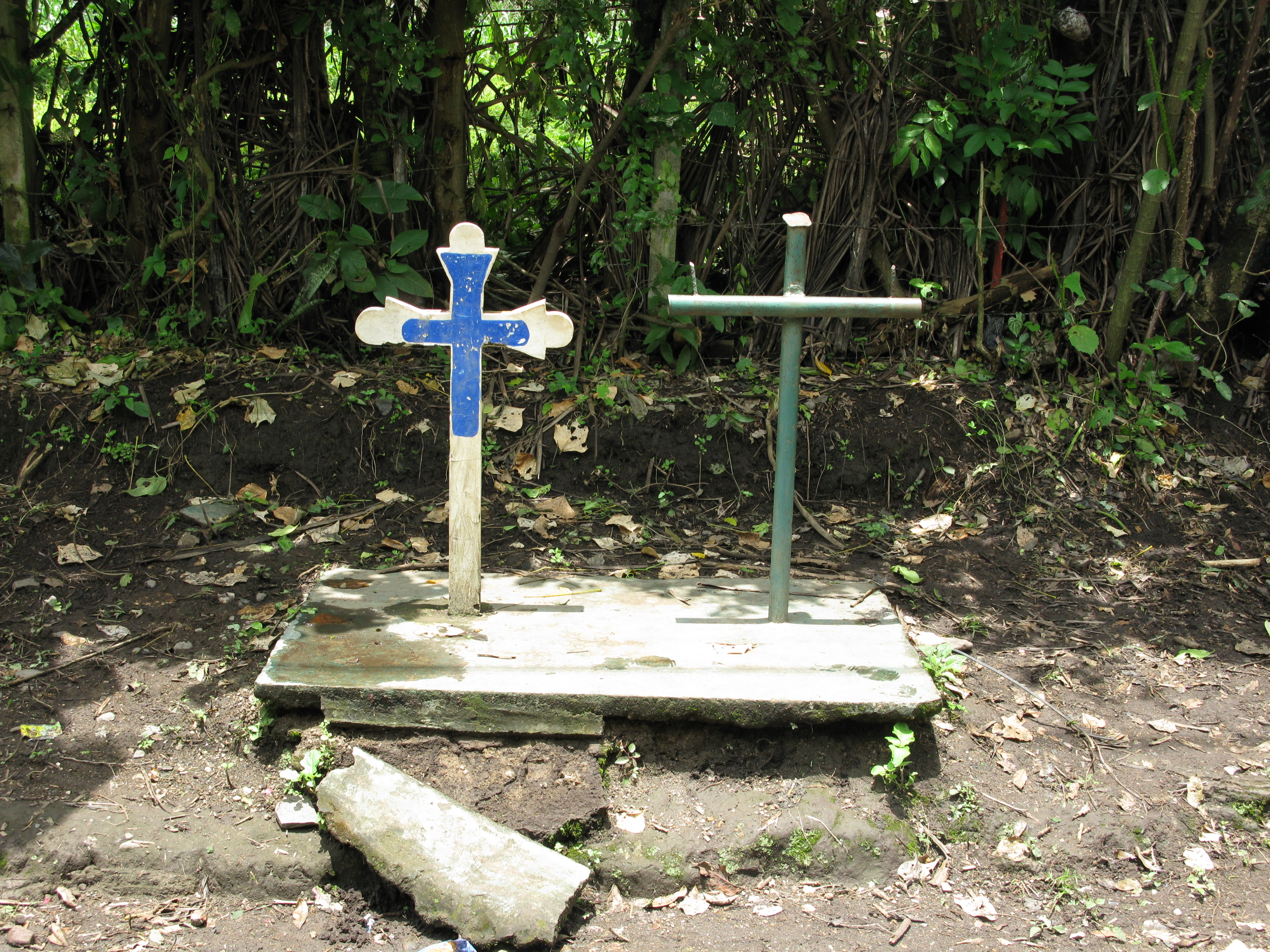
Carrillo memorial across from Montes de Penzberg ILS in Dos de Mayo

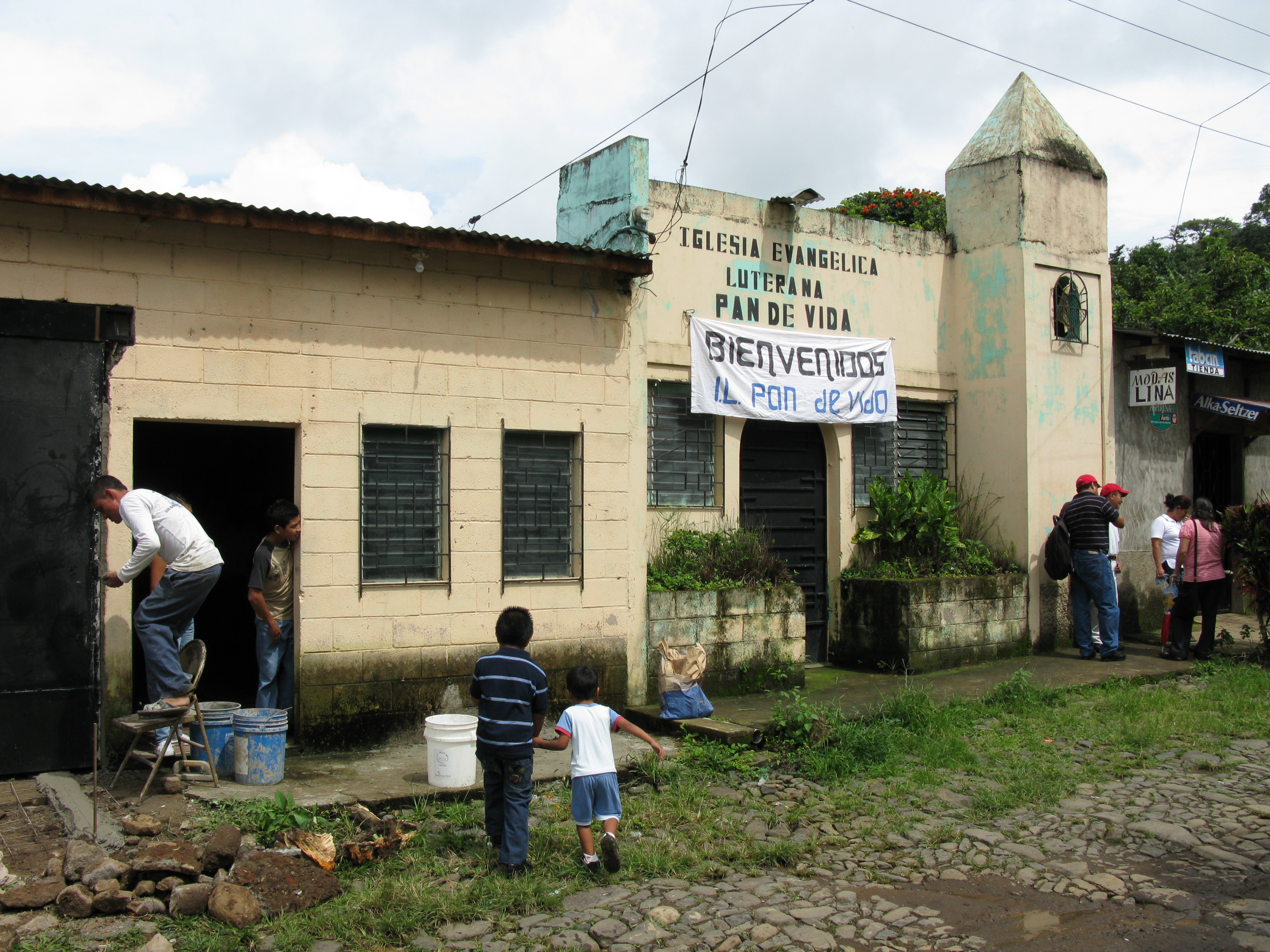
Pan de Vida ILS Lutheran Church in Jayaque, La Libertad, El Salvador
