= Iglesia El Carmen =

Iglesia del Carmen
- Iglesia de Nuestra Señora del Carmen
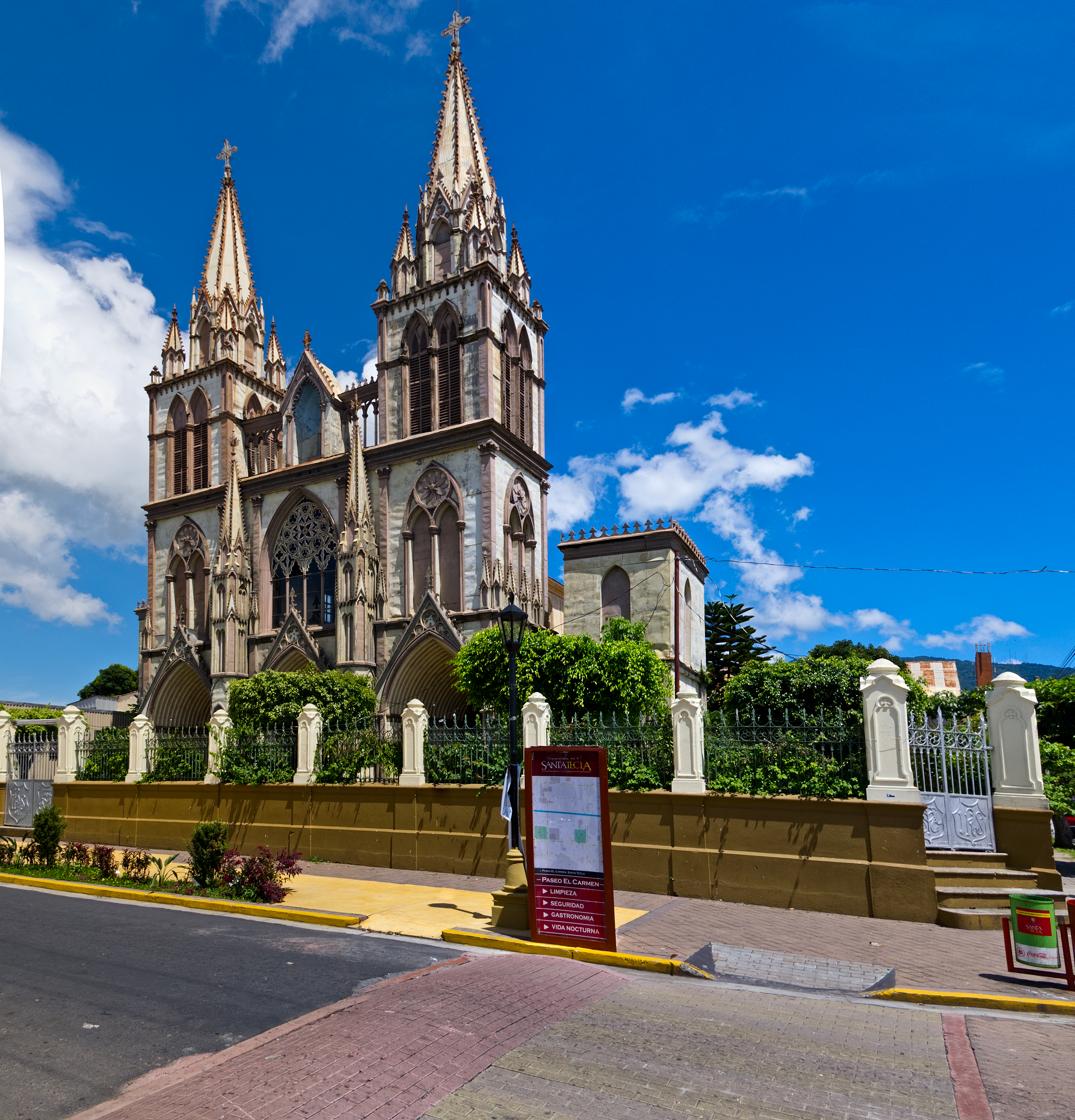
- Iglesia del Carmen
- 13°40′33″N 89°17′18″W
- Location: Santa Tecla
- Country: El Salvador
- Denomination: Catholic

Administration
- Diocese: Roman Catholic Archdiocese of San Salvador

The Iglesia de Nuestra Señora del Carmen (Spanish for Church of Our Lady of Mount Carmel) is a catholic parish church in the city of Santa Tecla, La Libertad Department, El Salvador. It was completed in 1914 in a neo-gothic style.

== History ==
The construction of the church was conducted in very specific phases, many of which are attributable to the priest in charge of the church at a given time.

=== 1856–1891: León de Jesús Castillo ===
In 1855, one year after the city of Nueva San Salvador was founded, Colonel León Castillo started constructing a church dedicated to the Lady of El Carmen. León Castillo had been active in armies under the command of General Francisco Morazán.

Records refer to him as a courageous soldier. His military career had been characterised by his commitment to liberal reform, something illustrated with his involvement in the expulsion of religious orders from El Salvador and the expropriation of churches since 1829, which is the year in which the liberal revolution began in Central America. The legend says that in 1840, León Castillo was injured during combat in Guatemala and managed to crawl to Iglesia del Carmen del Cerrito, where he promised to the Lady of El Carmen that if she saved his life, he would work his whole life to propagate her faith and he would build a temple for her. He was taken care of by the priest Antonio Larrazabal, and he lived in the temple for almost two years. Colonel Castillo was instructed in Catholic faith and sciences, before he finally could return to El Salvador.

León Castillo fulfilled his promise of reconstructing the chapel of Our Lady of El Carmen in the Church of la Merced in San Salvador after the earthquake of 1854. When a new capital was established in Nueva San Salvador after this earthquake, León Castillo decided to erect the church of his dreams in the new city.

Bishop Miguel Pineda y Saldaña and León Castillo chose a location for the church in the north of the city, near the current Belén school. The construction of this chapel started 9 August 1856. When the construction was well under way, León Castillo received an image of the Lady of El Carmen from Luis Batres, a friend who lived in Guatemala. This image was blessed and placed in the modest church by 11 April 1860. This building did not end up becoming Castillo's dream temple. He would have to wait and work hard to secure a larger piece of land elsewhere in the city and also obtain the necessary funding to build the church he wanted.

The war of 1863 compelled León Castillo to suspend construction to care for the wounded and the sick. He had also been working against the liberals to avoid the seminary next to Iglesia Concepción to be closed down and to prevent the forced emigration of the clerics.

When the war ended, the Bishop helped Colonel Castillo restart the work of Iglesia Concepción. The sacristy was built, as well as two aisles parallel to the central aisle and the belfry. The walls in the ends and on the sides were made of talpetate and brick. The construction of the belfry was initiated and three bells were placed on the top. An entrance was also built under the belfry that led to the monastery of Capuchin friars. The first Capuchin priests arrived in the middle of 1864 and they were provisionally placed in the seminary of Iglesia Concepción.

In 1866 Bishop Saldaña gave the unfinished church to the Capuchin order. The new owners gave the temple the name of Iglesia de Nuestra Señora de Belén, which was inaugurated on 1 March.

==== Construction of the current Iglesia del Carmen ====
In 1871, León Castillo acquired more land to the north of the main plaza in the city in 3rd Street-West. He decided to construct the temple he had dreamed of here. For this, he needed to acquire more land and gradually he managed to purchase it from the land owners of the area. First from Don Gregorio Valle on 16 September 1873; then from Don Esteban Vásquez on 17 September; from Don Manuel Dubón Rodríguez on 20 October 1874; and finally, a fourth piece of land from Don Tomás Dubón on 17 November 1877. The Iglesia del Carmen ended up being a bit larger than 5,000 square metres.

The ecclesiastical license to build the new temple was granted by the episcopal edict on 23 November 1876. The one to set the first stone was Bishop Luis Cárcamo y Rodríguez on 27 November 1878. The construction was financed mostly by donations and raffles. León Castillo managed to maintain construction work uninterruptedly. The Colonel died on 16 November 1891 and his body was buried under the first window of the left aisle.

=== 1892–1894: PP. Bernal y Argueta ===
Bishop Antonio Pérez y Aguilar, who later became an archbishop, ordered Father Juan José Bernal to continue construction work on the church and also named him its chaplain. After two years of work, the central aisle was completely renovated. Father José E. Argueta was named the new chaplain of the church in 1883. Father Argueta continued leading the construction work. In 1894, the left chapel was finished and it was dedicated to the Sacred Family and to the Sacred Heart of Jesus.

=== 1894–1916: P. José María López-Peña ===
Father José María López-Peña made considerable changes of notable artistic quality in the main aisle of the church. He decided to make the roof of the central aisle higher, following the Gothic style. Father López Peña also ordered the construction of a bigger and newer image of Our Lady of El Carmen. He paid the artist 175 silver pesos. This image was placed over the primitive main altar. In 1897 the sacristy was inaugurated. In 1898 the right chapel was opened and dedicated to the Holy Trinity and Divine Providence. These were represented with the most valuable sculptures in the church, which were an inheritance from the colonial period and had been kept in San Salvador in Iglesia San Francisco which was demolished during the earthquake of 1873. The chapel of the Holy Trinity and Divine Providence was almost entirely financed by the contributions of Beatriz Orantes de Estévez, the Gallardo Family, and Doña Concha Morales Villaseñor.

In 1899 Father López-Peña commissioned Pascasio González to decorate the most visible part of the main altar, and to do so in an imitation of the Gothic style. In 1900 the brick pavement was opened and the new altar was inaugurated on 16 July. The old altar was moved to the chapel of the Sacred Family where the image of the Sacred Heart of Jesus was installed. In June 1904 decoration works were concluded in the chapel of the Holy Trinity. The convent on the north or the temple was also completed. In the end of the same year the zinc and wooden constructions of the facade were finished and also the towers designed by Jose Jerez. The carpenter Luz Molina and the artist José Ruiz accepted to direct the work charging no honoraries for their contribution.

In 1941 the chaplain José Jerez became dissatisfied with the work in wood and he ambitiously redesigned the facade and towers. These plans never materialised, but the drawings have been conserved. José Jerez intentions were to construct a fabulous Gothic temple in stone and cement.

The last part of the temple in 1904 was built under the direction of a board composed of well known personalities in Santa Tecla These personalities were: Enriqueta Fajardo de Araujo, Carmen Estévez, Gertrudis Orellana, Isabel Morales, Juana Olivares Saldaña, Josefina Alcaine and Rosalía Chavez.

In 1910 the church's facade was completed. The bronze image of the Lady of El Carmen was dedicated 25 March. The artwork was donated by Recaredo Gallardo and his wife, Carmen Alvarado de Gallardo. Painting inside the sanctuary was concluded in 1913.

This concluded the construction work started 37 years earlier by León Castillo. Father López-Peña made further efforts to expand the convent; he eventually gave it to priests of the Society of Jesus, who have been responsible for the church since. From that point forward, a Jesuit priest has always been the chaplain of the church.

== The arrival of the Jesuits ==
When the necessary canonical authorizations were granted, the priests of the Society of Jesus received the church and residence of El Carmen in January 1916. The sanctuary had to be repaired a little over a year later due to an earthquake. The painting and artistic restoration was performed by brother Frías S.J. He is the same artist who painted the image of the Lady of Guadalupe in the Gothic altar of the Salesian workshops of the School of Arts and Trades in Santa Tecla. The crucified Christ of the altar and the screen of the main gate as well as the confessional booths and pulpit were carved in these workshops.

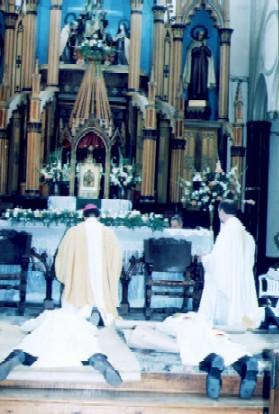
Young Jesuits Accept Vows Before 2001

== The earthquakes of 2001 ==
On 13 January and 11 February 2001, the territory of El Salvador was struck by two powerful earthquakes of 7.7 and 6.1 magnitudes in the Richter scale. These events completely damaged Iglesia del Carmen, prompting the Society of Jesus to initiate plans to raise funds to demolish the existing structure and begin building a new church. Public authorities in El Salvador have reportedly delayed this procedure because they want to make sure that the structures of the church cannot be rescued before they authorize the demolition of this cultural and historical milestone of Nueva San Salvador. The "El Carmen Project" is a non-profit foundation that has been set up by Universidad Centroamericana "José Simeón Cañas" to attract and administer donations for the reconstruction of the church.

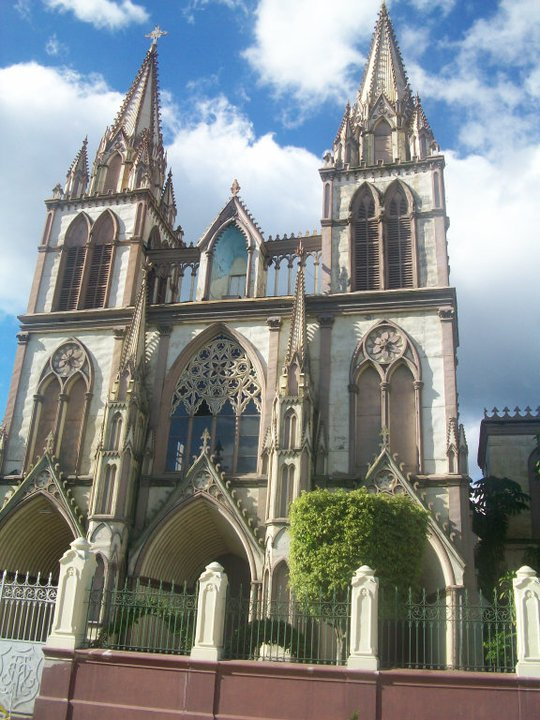
Current view of the church
