= Sacacoyo =

- District
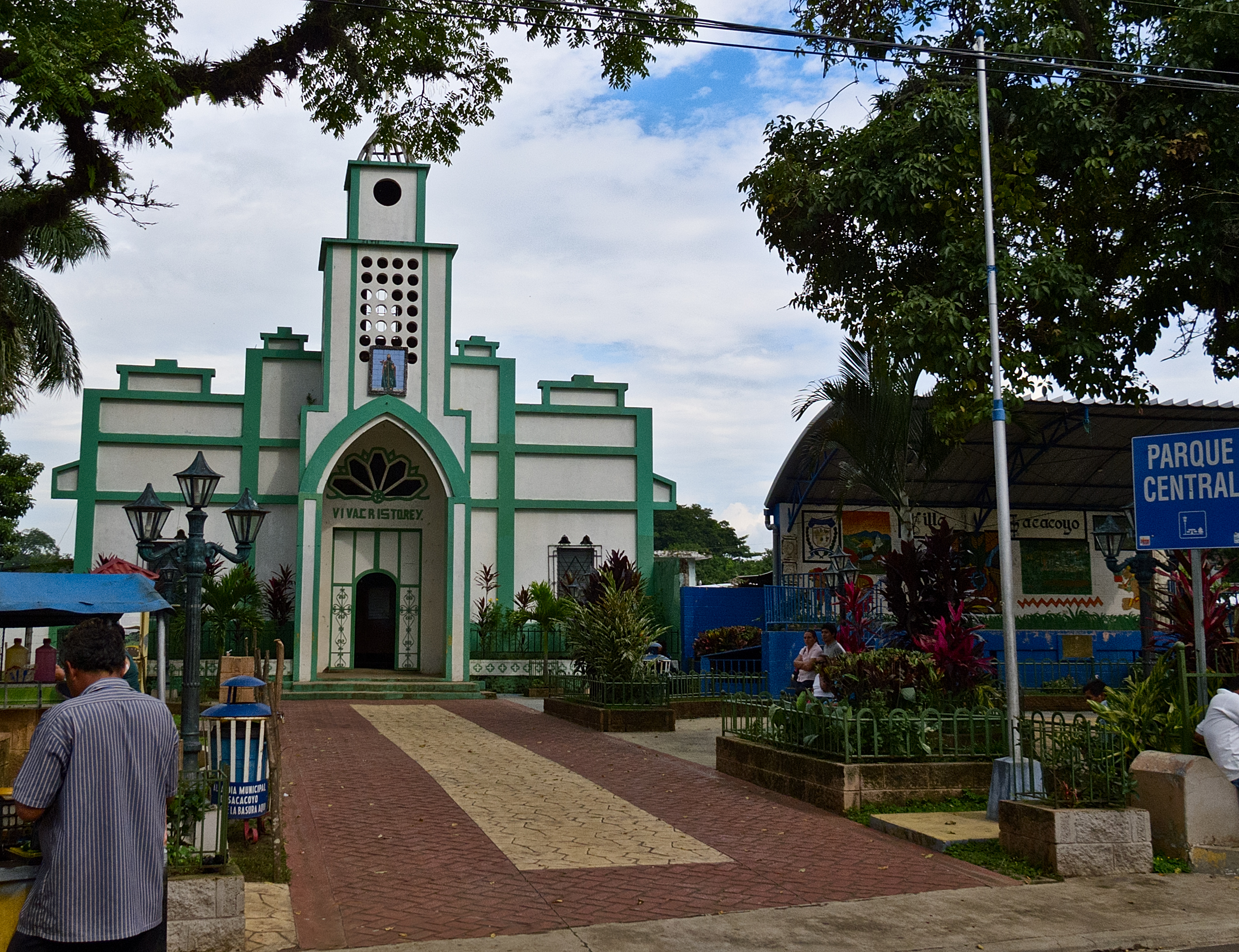

- Location in El Salvador
- Coordinates: 13°44′N 89°28′W
- Country: El Salvador
- Department: La Libertad
- Elevation: 2,172 ft (662 m)

Population (2024)
  - District: 15,915
  - Estimate (2026): 18,855
  - Rank: 89th in El Salvador
  - Urban: 12,782
  - Rural: 3,133

Sacacoyo is a municipality in the La Libertad department of El Salvador.

== History ==
The name Sacacoyo comes from the Nahua phrase "En el camino de coyotes y zacate" (in the path of coyotes and grass) In 1890, Sacacoyo had a population of 1,870 people. In 1905, Sacacoyo was combined as part of Tepecoyo, but on 11 May 1907 was recreated as Sacacoyo by legislative decree.

== Geography ==
Administrative divisions:

Sacacoyo is made up of three cantons:

- Ateos (historically Atehuan)
- Buena Vista
- La Montañita
