= El Salvador–France relations =

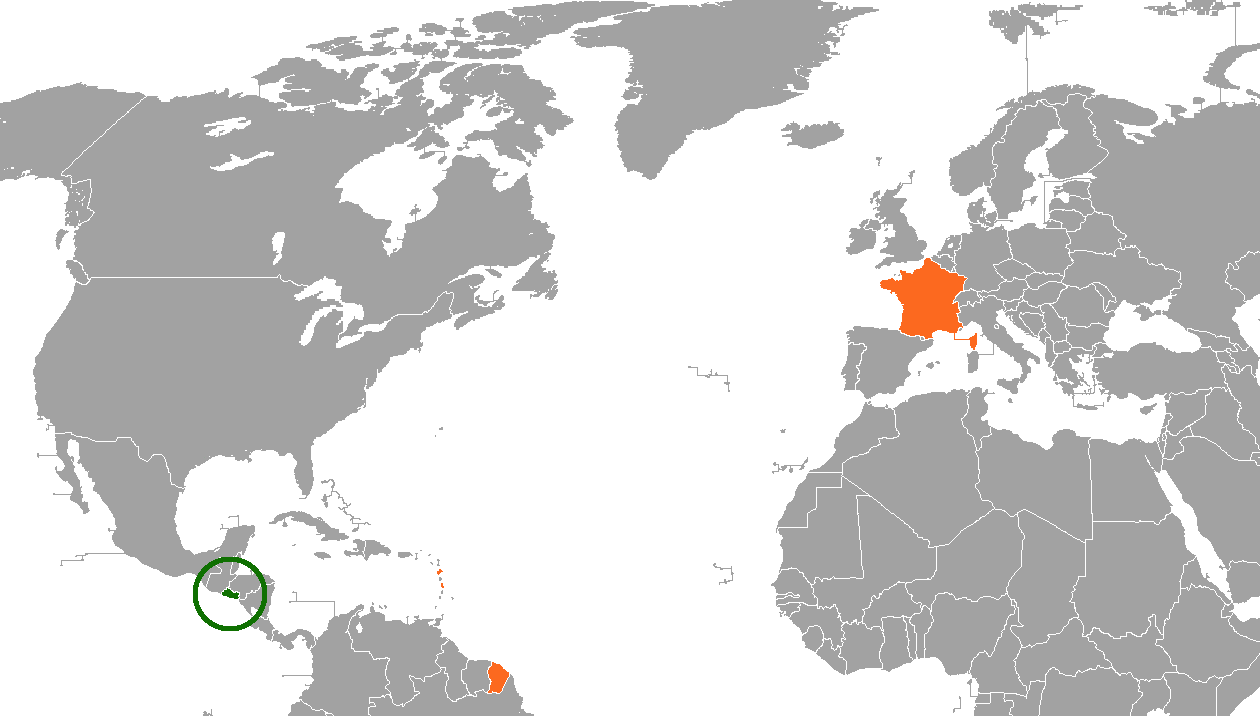

- El Salvador: France

El Salvador and France have maintained diplomatic relations since 1858. The two nations maintain a close dialogue on Central American regional integration, democratic security, good governance, the rule of law, as well as development aid, among other issues. Both are also members of the United Nations.

== History ==
In 1841, El Salvador obtained its independence after the dissolution of the Federal Republic of Central America. On 2 January 1858, El Salvador and France established diplomatic relations with the signing of a Treaty of Friendship, Commerce and Navigation. Soon afterwards, a few French people migrated to El Salvador. In 1943, French author Antoine de Saint-Exupéry published The Little Prince. In the book, the Prince's kindhearted but petulant and vain rose was inspired by Saint-Exupéry's Salvadoran wife, Consuelo de Saint-Exupéry, with the small home planet of the Prince being inspired by El Salvador.

In 1981, during the Salvadoran Civil War, France (along with Mexico) recognized that the Salvadoran rebels (FMLN) represented a sector of the population and, therefore, they had the right to participate in a political solution to the civil war. It was the first time that two governments, without breaking diplomatic relations with the Junta of El Salvador, formally recognized the existence of a legitimate opposition force that must participate in any solution to the crisis. Peace was established between the FMLN and the Salvadoran government with the signing of the Chapultepec Peace Accords in 1992. In 2012, France commemorated the 20th anniversary of the signing of the peace accords in Paris and was attended by Salvadoran Foreign Minister Hugo Martínez.

In October 2013, both nations celebrated 155 years of diplomatic relations. In April 2016, French Envoy, Jean-Pierre Bel, paid a visit to El Salvador and met with President Salvador Sánchez Cerén. In October 2016, Salvadoran Foreign Minister Hugo Martínez paid a second visit to France where he signed an agreement between both nations to facilitate the financing operations of Proparco, a subsidiary of the French Development Agency (AFD), in El Salvador.

== Cultural and Educational Cooperation ==
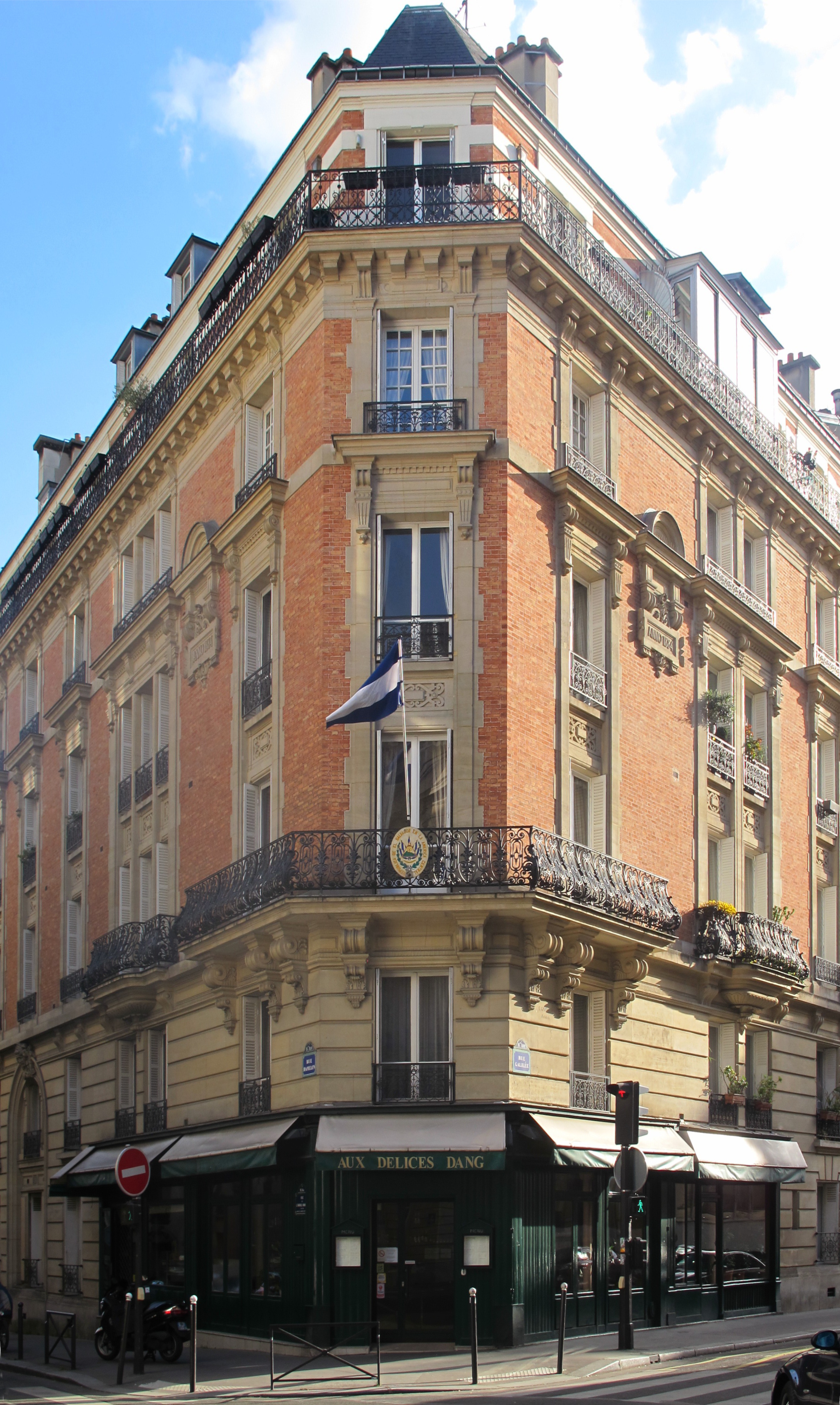
Embassy of El Salvador in Paris

Bilateral cooperation between both nations are mainly dedicated to the promotion of the French language, cultural exchanges and university training in El Salvador. The French government supports the Lycée Français de San Salvador (also known as the Consuelo et Antoine de Saint-Exupéry high school), with more than 1,300 students. Furthermore, there is an Alliance française in San Salvador which guarantees the training of French speaking teachers.

In June 2017, both nations signed a framework agreement for cultural, university, scientific and technical cooperation. In March 2018, both nations also signed an agreement for the mutual recognition of diplomas. In 2019, there were 230 Salvadoran students pursuing higher studies in France. Salvadorans make up the largest Central American students in France.

== Resident diplomatic missions ==
- El Salvador has an embassy in Paris.
- France has an embassy in San Salvador.

== See also ==
- Foreign relations of El Salvador
- Foreign relations of France
