= Lycée Français de San Salvador =

- Liceo Francés de El Salvador

Location
- 19 Avenida Norte, KM 10½ Carretera a Santa Tecla; Santa Tecla; El Salvador; 13.6755947°N 89.2755032°W

Information
- Type: French international school
- Established: 1971
- Grades: K–12
- Enrollment: Approx. 800
- Language: French, Spanish
- Website: lfelsalvador.org

Lycée Français de San Salvador "Antoine et Consuelo de Saint-Exupéry" (Spanish: Liceo Francés de San Salvador) is a private French international school located in Santa Tecla, El Salvador. It is part of the global network of French schools abroad overseen by the AEFE (Agency for French Education Abroad).

Founded in 1971, the school offers a bilingual French-Spanish education from early childhood through lycée (senior high school). It follows the official curriculum of the French Ministry of National Education, while incorporating elements of the Salvadoran system to ensure dual recognition of diplomas.

The school is named in honor of the French writer and aviator Antoine de Saint-Exupéry and his Salvadoran wife, Consuelo de Saint-Exupéry, adding a special cultural and historical connection to the country.

== Curriculum ==
Instruction is primarily in French, with Spanish and English taught as additional languages. Students prepare for the French baccalauréat diploma, which provides access to universities in France, El Salvador, and internationally. The school also integrates aspects of Salvadoran civics and culture to prepare students for local higher education if desired.

== Facilities ==
The campus includes:

- Modern classrooms and science laboratories
- A bilingual library and media center
- Sports facilities, including a soccer field and gymnasium
- Spaces for performing arts and extracurricular activities

== Student body ==
The school hosts students of various nationalities, primarily French and Salvadorian, fostering a multicultural environment. It serves as a hub for French-speaking families and international professionals living in the region.

== Accreditation ==
Lycée Français de San Salvador is accredited by the AEFE and inspected by the French Ministry of Education, ensuring consistency with French pedagogical standards.

== See also ==
- El Salvador–France relations
- AEFE
- French people in El Salvador
