= Chiltiupán =

- District
- Location in El Salvador
- Coordinates: 13°35′N 89°28′W
- Country: El Salvador
- Department: La Libertad
- Elevation: 1,765 ft (538 m)

Population (2024)
  - District: 10,914
  - Rank: 125th in El Salvador
  - Rural: 10,914

Chiltiupán is a municipality in the La Libertad department of El Salvador, located 55 km (34 mi) southwest of the capital San Salvador. Its population is 25,000 in 29 cantons.

The Santo Domingo School was destroyed by earthquakes in 2001. Today, 950 children attend classes in the new school built with a grant from Aid to International Development. Forty percent of the children need assistance to attend classes.

Since 1964, the Diocese of Cleveland has sent priests, sisters and lay women to serve the people of El Salvador as part of the Cleveland Latin American Mission Team (CLAM). Today five priests and one Ursuline Sister serve the most forgotten people in four different regions: Chiltiupán, El Carmen, La Libertad and Teotepeque.

The Cleveland Latin American Mission Team has supported educational, pastoral, and community development initiatives in Chiltiupán and surrounding communities. In addition to providing religious services, members of the mission have worked with local residents to address educational needs and improve access to resources for children and families. The team’s work forms part of the Diocese of Cleveland’s longstanding mission presence in El Salvador.

== Climate ==
Climate data for Chiltiupán (1991–2020)
| Month | Jan | Feb | Mar | Apr | May | Jun | Jul | Aug | Sep | Oct | Nov | Dec | Year |
|---|---|---|---|---|---|---|---|---|---|---|---|---|---|
| Mean daily maximum °C (°F) | 30.7 (87.3) | 31.4 (88.5) | 32.0 (89.6) | 31.9 (89.4) | 30.6 (87.1) | 30.0 (86.0) | 30.6 (87.1) | 30.4 (86.7) | 29.8 (85.6) | 29.7 (85.5) | 30.2 (86.4) | 30.5 (86.9) | 30.7 (87.3) |
| Daily mean °C (°F) | 23.8 (74.8) | 24.1 (75.4) | 24.3 (75.7) | 24.4 (75.9) | 24.1 (75.4) | 23.9 (75.0) | 24.3 (75.7) | 24.0 (75.2) | 23.4 (74.1) | 23.3 (73.9) | 23.8 (74.8) | 23.9 (75.0) | 23.9 (75.0) |
| Mean daily minimum °C (°F) | 21.2 (70.2) | 21.5 (70.7) | 21.9 (71.4) | 22.1 (71.8) | 21.4 (70.5) | 20.9 (69.6) | 20.8 (69.4) | 20.7 (69.3) | 20.5 (68.9) | 20.6 (69.1) | 20.9 (69.6) | 21.0 (69.8) | 21.1 (70.0) |
| Average precipitation mm (inches) | 1.5 (0.06) | 1.6 (0.06) | 9.8 (0.39) | 50.8 (2.00) | 212.9 (8.38) | 334.2 (13.16) | 319.8 (12.59) | 333.4 (13.13) | 424.2 (16.70) | 389.1 (15.32) | 74.3 (2.93) | 7.4 (0.29) | 2,159.1 (85.00) |
| Average relative humidity (%) | 64 | 64 | 66 | 72 | 80 | 83 | 80 | 82 | 86 | 85 | 73 | 67 | 75.1 |
Source: Ministerio de Medio Ambiente y Recursos Naturales
