= Zaragoza, El Salvador =

Zaragoza
- District
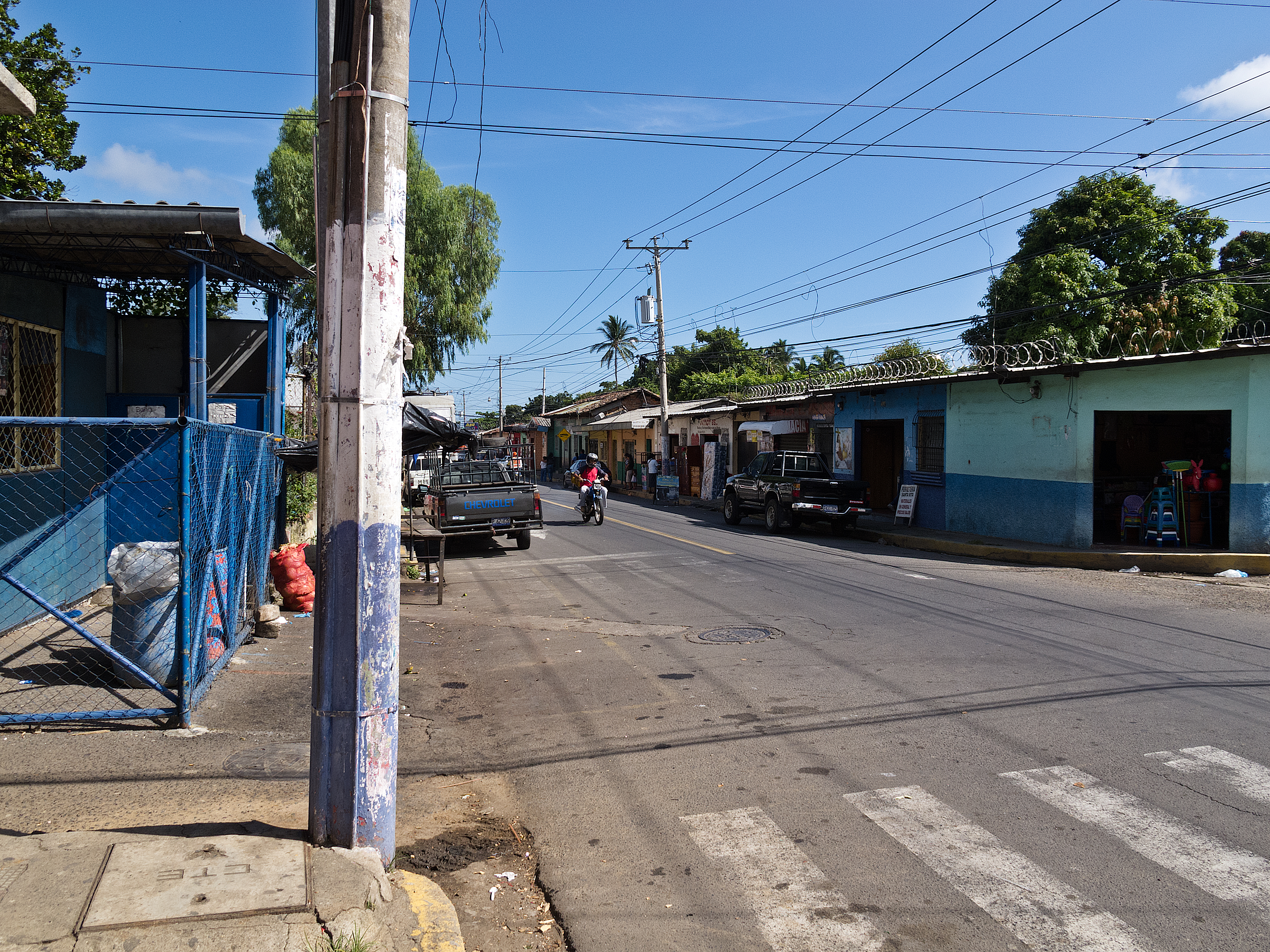

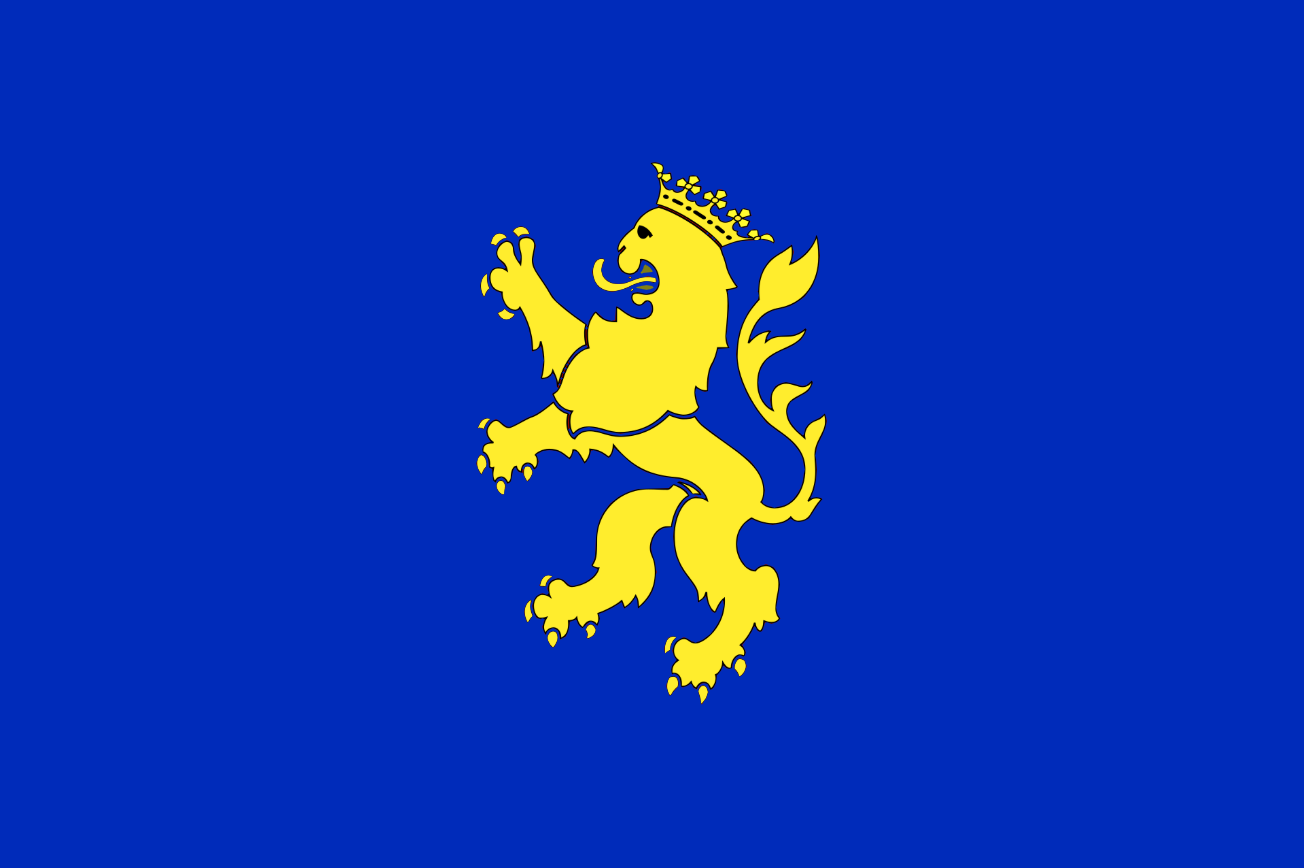
- Flag

- Location in El Salvador
- Coordinates: 13°35′N 89°17′W
- Country: El Salvador
- Department: La Libertad
- Elevation: 1,988 ft (606 m)

Population (2024)
  - District: 26,510
  - Estimate (2026): 30,555
  - Rank: 57th in El Salvador
  - Urban: 24,955
  - Rural: 1,555

Zaragoza is a municipality in the La Libertad department of El Salvador.

Zaragoza is a small city between the cities of La Libertad and Santa Tecla. It is the third largest city in the department of La Libertad. The city has developed an important growth during the last 20 years, due to the suburban expansion of San Salvador.

== Media ==
Zaragoza has a radio denominated "Radio Bálsamo" in the frequency 92.1.

== Places to visit ==
=== Church "Nuestra señora del pilar" ===
Zaragoza has a church located in the center of the town. The church has already a large existence, but it is not known what date it appeared, since the "founders" of Zaragoza died, and few people still know of that. There is a book called "los relatos de mi abuela" where it talks about the stories of characters and places and even some traditions about the town.

=== Central Plaza ===
There are two soccer fields, two basketball courts and a skating rink, as well as a multipurpose room, a free virtual library and a modern municipal palace.

=== Waterparks ===
One of the attractions of Zaragoza is the "Montaña acuática". It is 2 kilometers from Zaragoza on the road to the port of La Libertad.
