= La Libertad Department (El Salvador) =

Department of El Salvador

La Libertad
- Department
- Flag Coat of arms

- Location within El Salvador
- Coordinates: 13°46′30″N 89°21′32″W
- Country: El Salvador
- Created (given current status): 1865
- Seat: Santa Tecla

Area
  - Total: 1,652.9 km^{2} (638.2 sq mi)
  - Rank: Ranked 6th

Population (2024)
  - Total: 765,879
  - Rank: Ranked 2nd
  - Density: 463.35/km^{2} (1,200.1/sq mi)
- Time zone: UTC−6 (CST)
- ISO 3166 code: SV-LI

La Libertad (Spanish pronunciation: [la liβeɾˈtað]) is one of the departments of El Salvador and is located in the southwest of the country. The capital is Santa Tecla. It has an area 1,653 km^{2} (638 sq mi) and a population of 765,879 people.

== History ==
It was classified as a department on January 28, 1865. The population was settled on the Ulliman Plains, which is where rubber is harvested. The city was called "Nueva San Salvador" (New San Salvador) and made the department's capital on the same date as the department was declared. The department's capital was renamed Santa Tecla on December 22, 2003. The agricultural products that are cultivated are the basic grains, balsam, sugar cane, coffee, grass, hortensia, cocoa, and fruits. They also develop the bovine, equine and pig cattle, the raising of poultry and beekeeping. It also stands out in the textile industry and the production of candles, soaps, furniture, clothes, footwear, dairy products, and many diverse products and liquors.

At 12 km. to the west of the capital city, in a valley at 923 meters above sea level, is located the town of Santa Tecla whose official name is Nueva San Salvador. Because it is between on the sides of Quezaltepeque or Volcano of San Salvador and a low and picturesque mountain, in poetic language it is designated as "The city of the hills". The earthquake of April 16, 1854, destroyed the capital city from its foundations. Facing the moving debris, the President José María San Martín settled the government's new headquarters in the plain of Santa Tecla. The decree was emitted the following August 8, but it was not until Christmas Day of the same year that the neighbours took possession of the place and they swore vicinity. It was ascended to the category of departmental head on January 28, 1865.

The parks "Daniel Hernandez", with the bust in marble of the educator, and "San Martín", with a monument erected celebrating the centennial of the city of Nueva San Salvador, are located in Santa Tecla. It has modern and old churches: The parish of Concepción and the neo-Gothic Carmen's Church, built at the end of the past century by the architect, sculptor, and painter Pascacio Gonzales.

== Municipalities ==
1. La Libertad Centro
2. La Libertad Costa
3. La Libertad Este
4. La Libertad Norte
5. La Libertad Oeste
6. La Libertad Sur

== Districts ==
1. Antiguo Cuscatlán
2. Chiltiupán
3. Ciudad Arce
4. Colón
5. Comasagua
6. Huizúcar
7. Jayaque
8. Jicalapa
9. La Libertad
10. Nuevo Cuscatlán
11. Quezaltepeque
12. Sacacoyo
13. San José Villanueva
14. San Juan Opico
15. San Matías
16. San Pablo Tacachico
17. Santa Tecla
18. Talnique
19. Tamanique
20. Teotepeque
21. Tepecoyo
22. Zaragoza

== Gastronomy ==
The Port of La Libertad and its restaurants are considered a famous place for their typical plates: shrimp cocktails, fish ceviches, fresh oysters, and snails. Also, the cluster of tourism of the port of La Libertad celebrates the Gastronomic Festival which is distinguished annually because each restaurant exposes its best menu for sale. During the Festival, combo music livens up the whole day in the sector of the beaches.

== Archeological ruins ==
=== Joya De Cerén ===
Joya de Cerén was a Maya village that was buried by the eruption of the Loma Caldera volcano in the year 600 AD. The volcanic lava petrified the houses of the residents and it was not until 1976 that it was accidentally discovered. This archeological site is considered very important to the study of Maya civilization since it offers a rare look at the lifestyle of Maya commoners in a typical agricultural village, rather than a major urban center. It was declared a UNESCO World Heritage Site in 1993.

=== San Andrés ===
San Andrés is a pre-Columbian archaeological site located in San Juan Opico municipality. This site consists of three Mesoamerican pyramids, the tallest of which is of 10 metres (33 ft) in height.

== Gallery ==
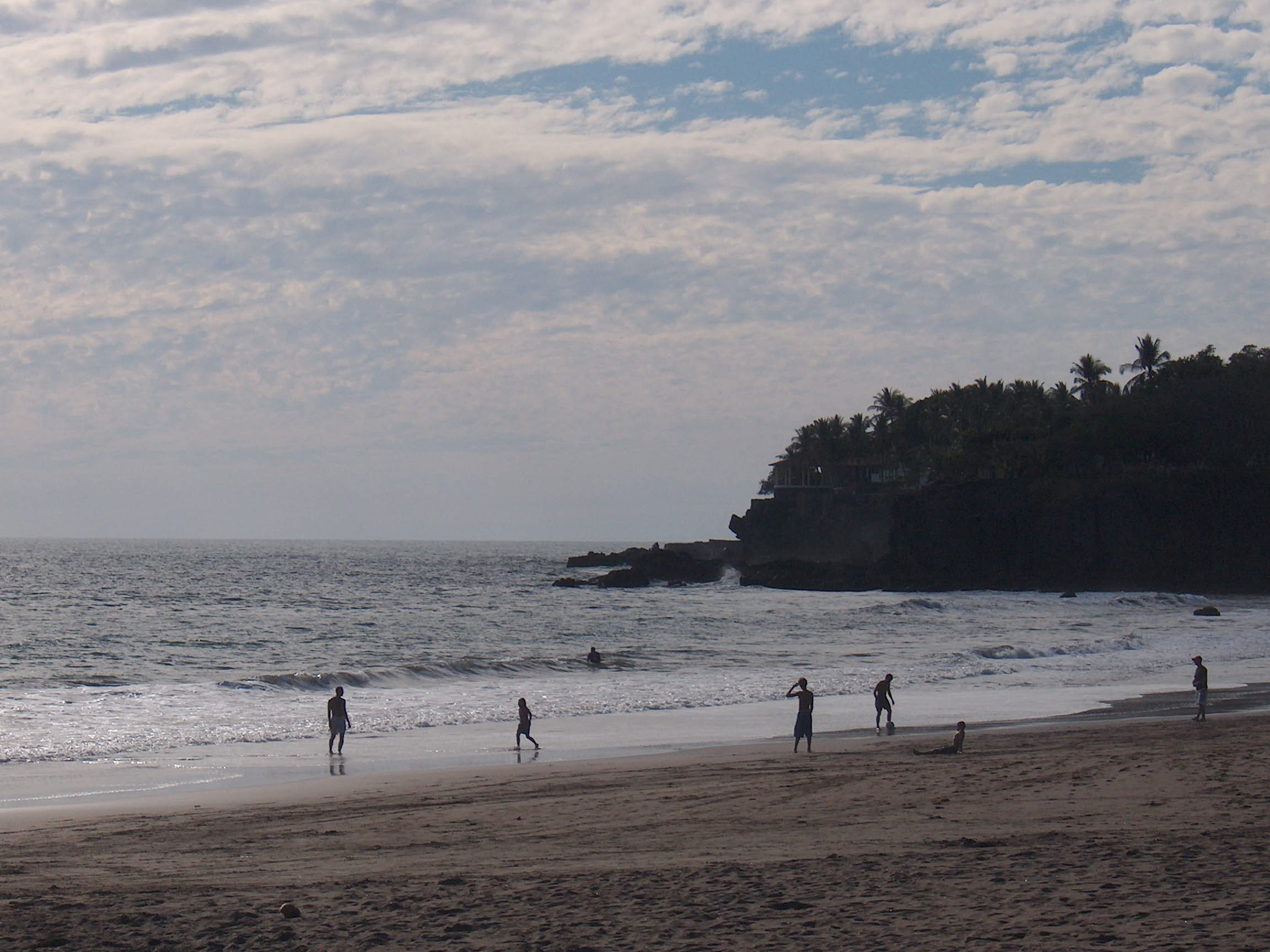
