= Tepecoyo =

- District
- Location within El Salvador
- Coordinates: 13°42′1″N 89°28′4″W
- Country: El Salvador
- Department: La Libertad
- Elevation: 694 m (2,277 ft)

Population (2024)
  - District: 14,097
  - Estimate (2026): 17,426
  - Rank: 95th in El Salvador
  - Urban: 11,464
  - Rural: 2,633

Tepecoyo is a municipality in the La Libertad department of El Salvador, situated 30 minutes from Santa Tecla.

== Tradition ==
Tepecoyo is a very old and traditional town like every other Pipil settlement. It was founded by only four families.

Its traditions and inhabitants are characteristic for this type of municipality. The municipal celebrations are held annually from 1 to 6 January. No matter the day of the week, when the celebrations take place, these are celebrations of happiness with a high content of Maya and Pipil tradition from present and past times.
