= Talnique =

- District
- Location in El Salvador
- Coordinates: 13°40′N 89°24′W
- Country: El Salvador
- Department: La Libertad

Government
  - Mayor: COALICIÓN GANA-NUEVAS IDEAS - Alexander Cabrera

Area
  - District: 11.475 sq mi (29.72 km^{2})
- Elevation: 2,900 ft (884 m)

Population (2024)
  - District: 5,596
  - Estimate (2026): 9,203
  - Rank: 191st in El Salvador
  - Urban: 2,908
  - Rural: 2,688
- Time zone: CST (GMT-6)

Talnique is a municipality in the La Libertad department of El Salvador. The town is built atop a mountain with only one access road. The people rely on a combination of coffee farming and tourism.

== History ==
The town of Talnique has Pre-Columbian origins. In the year 1550 it had approx. 550 inhabitants.

== General information ==
The town has an area of about 11.5 sq mi and an altitude of roughly 2,900 ft. They celebrate Saint Luis King of France in the month of August. The name Talnique means "Hill of the Talnetes" or "The place of the wasps of the Earth." In years past Talnique was called "Terlinquetepeque" (1548), "San Luis Talnitepeque" (1740), "Talniquetet" (1770), and finally "Talnique" (1807).
