= San Juan Opico =

- District
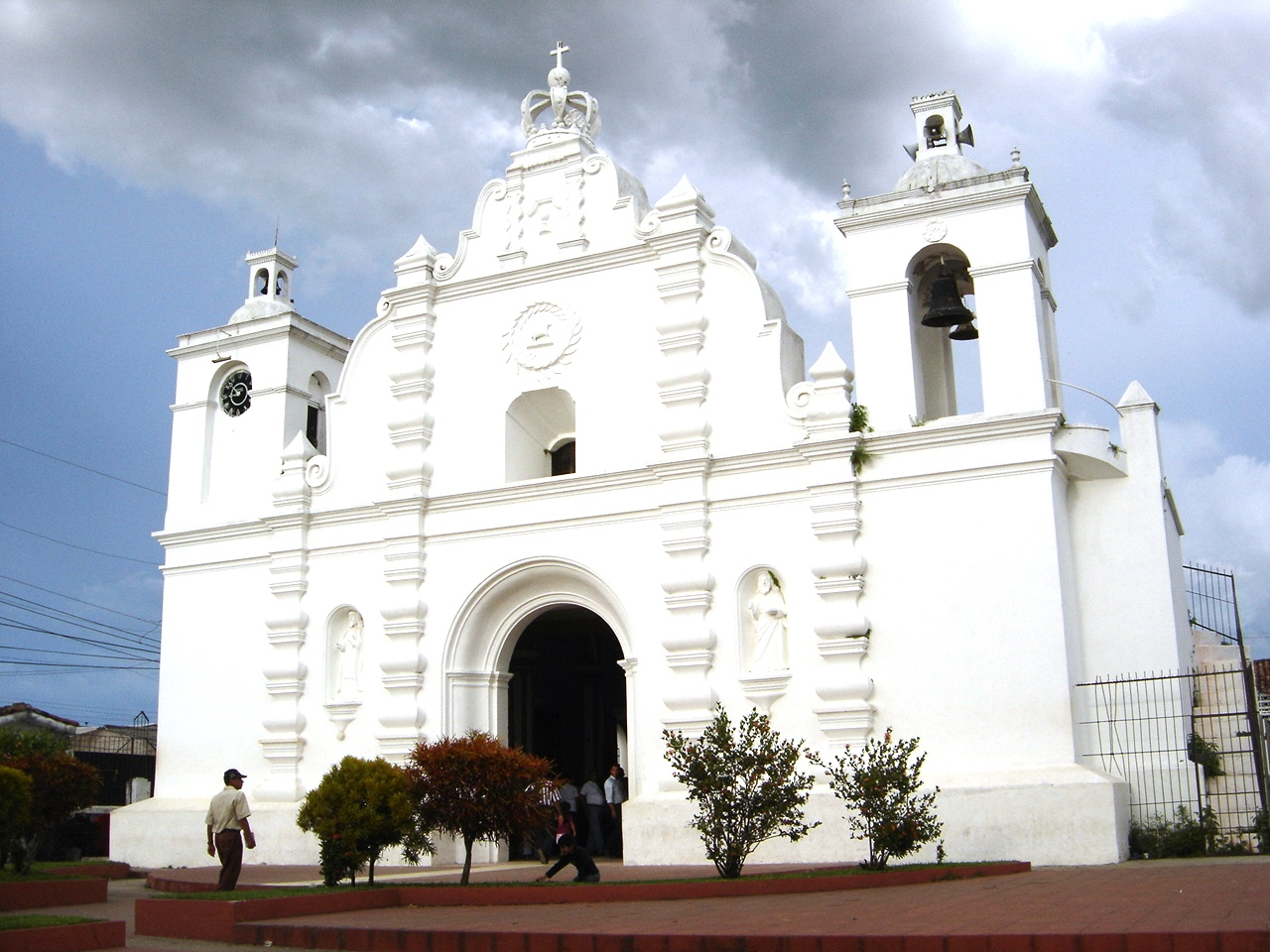
- San Juan Evangelista Parochial Church

- Location in El Salvador
- Coordinates: 13°53′N 89°21′W
- Country: El Salvador
- Department: La Libertad

Area
  - District: 84 sq mi (218 km^{2})
- Elevation: 1,614 ft (492 m)

Population (2024)
  - District: 97,210
  - Rank: 11th in El Salvador
  - Urban: 74,541
  - Rural: 22,669

San Juan Opico (or Opico) is a municipality in the La Libertad department of El Salvador.

It is located 42 kilometers from San Salvador, capital of the country. The municipality has an area of 218 km^{2} and a population of 74,280 inhabitants; according to the 2007 census it is ranked No. 13 in population.

Within its territory are pre-Columbian archaeological sites like Joya de Cerén and San Andrés and a church built in the colonial era.

== History ==
Opico was established as an Indian village in 1572 and received the title of town in 1881.

=== Administrative divisions ===
It has 27 cantons: San Jose la Cueva, Talcualuya, El Castillo, Buena Vista, Nombre de Dios, San Antonio, San Pedro Martir, Tehuicho, Barranca Honda, Los Amates, Pitichorro, Nueva Encarnación, Chantusnene, San Nicolás Encarnación, Minas de Plomo, San Pedro Oriente, San Felipe, Los Encuentros, Agua Escondida, Lomas de Santiago, Joya de Ceren, Sitio del Niño, Chanmico, Matazano, Sitio Grande, El Jabali, Las Delicias, and Las Granadillas.

== Sports ==
The local football club is named Juventud Independiente and it played in the Salvadoran Premier Division after being promoted in Summer 2011. Now they play in the second division. They play their home games at the Complejo Municipal.
