= Comasagua =

- District
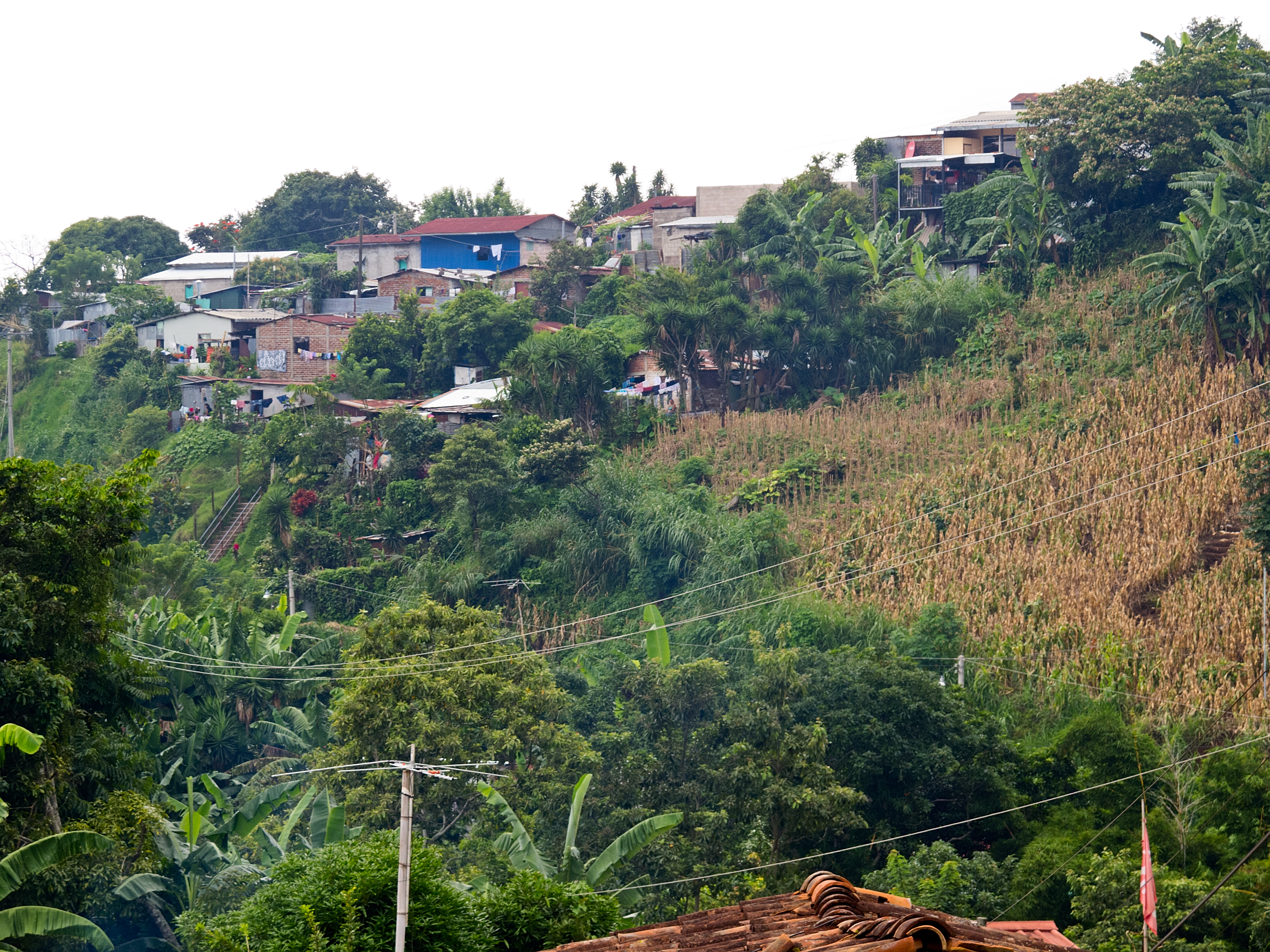

- Location in El Salvador
- Coordinates: 13°38′N 89°23′W
- Country: El Salvador
- Department: La Libertad
- Elevation: 3,307 ft (1,008 m)

Population (2024)
  - District: 12,705
  - Estimate (2026): 15,063
  - Rank: 110th in El Salvador
  - Rural: 12,705

Comasagua is a municipality in the La Libertad department of El Salvador.

During the January 2001 El Salvador earthquake, a landslide wiped out the only road leading to Comasagua, constraining relief efforts. The town was also at the center of destruction during the 1982 El Salvador earthquake.

== Gallery ==
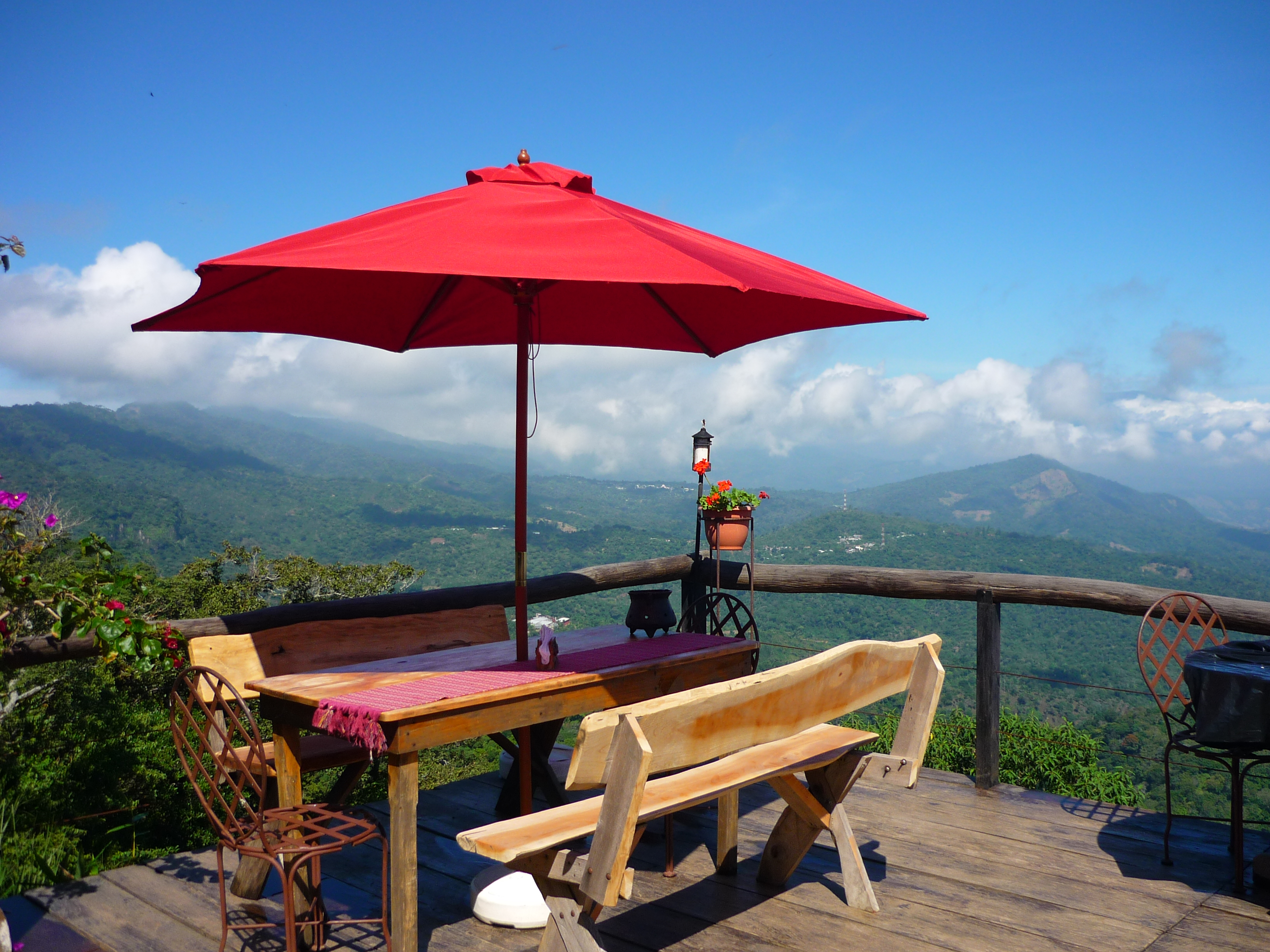
Panoramic view from local Restaurant.

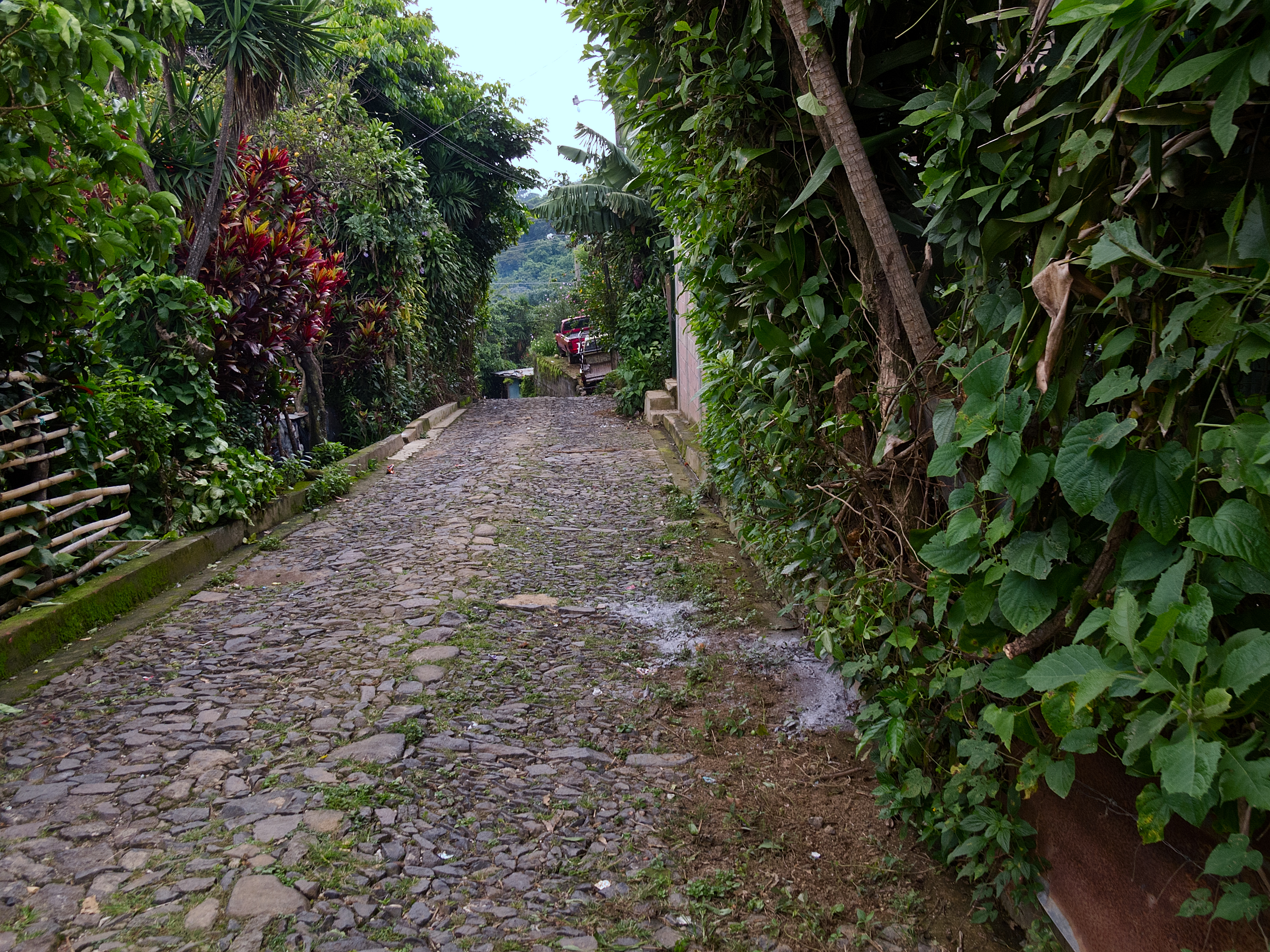
Streets of Comasagua

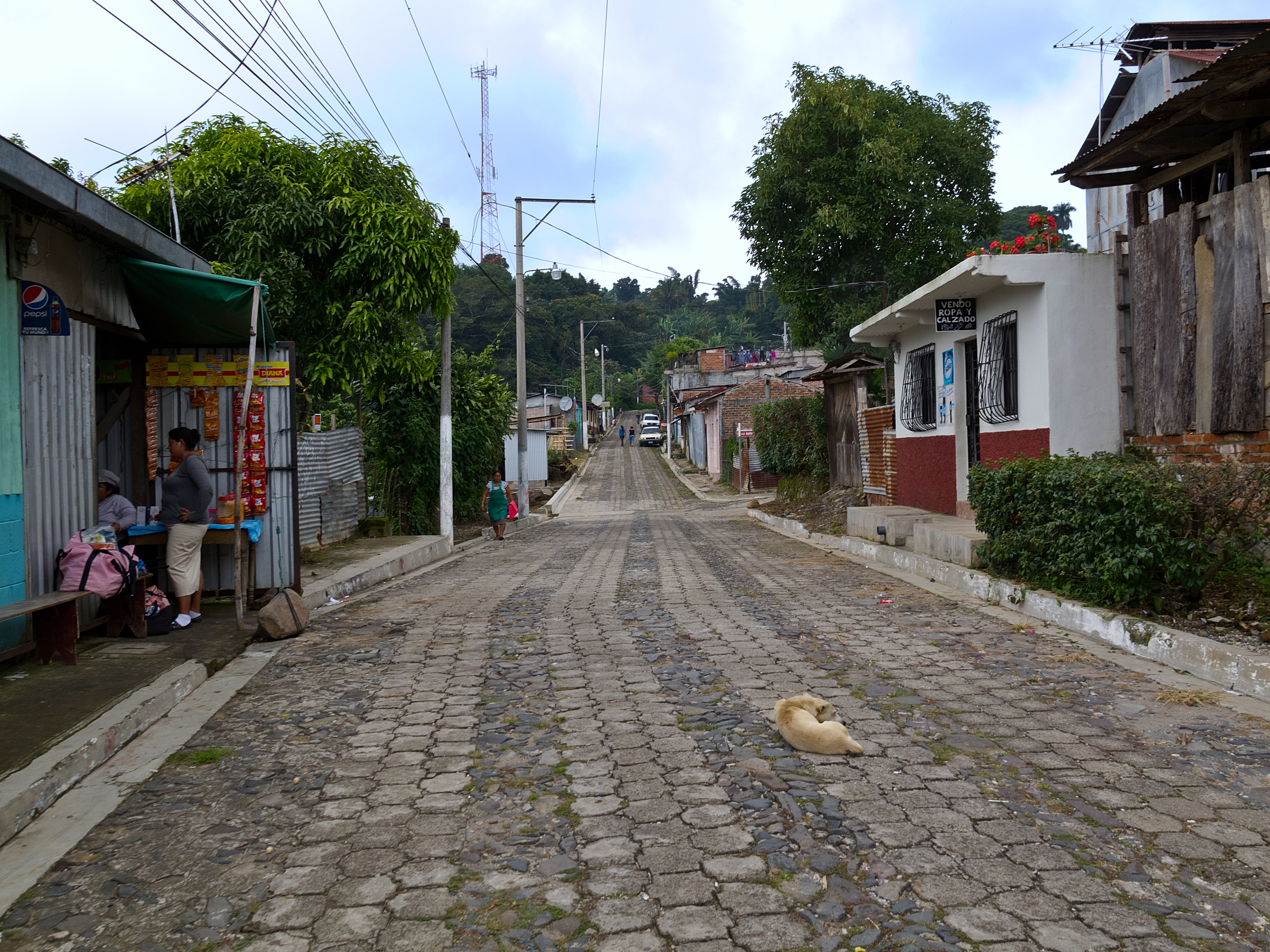

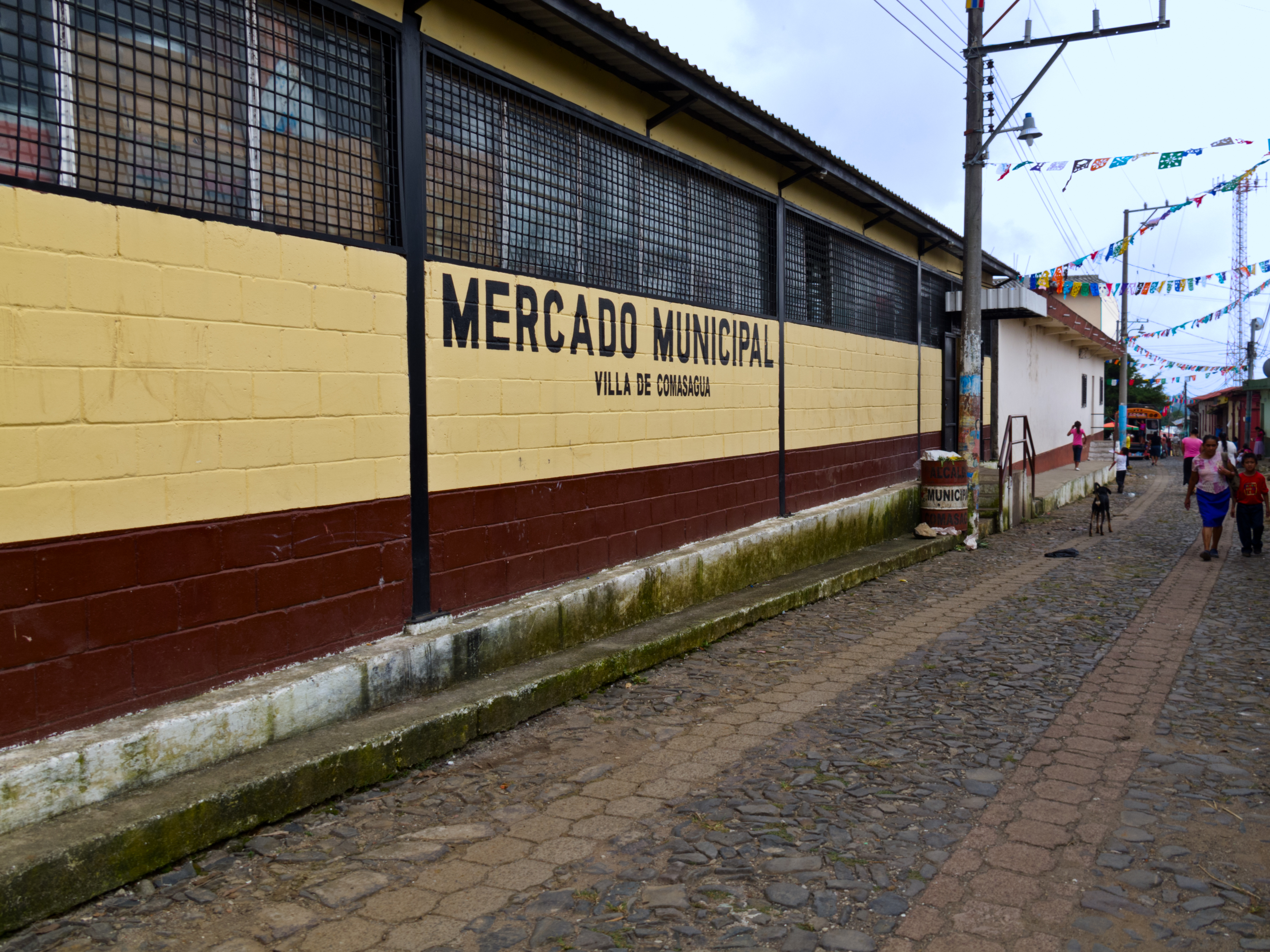
Central Market of Comasagua

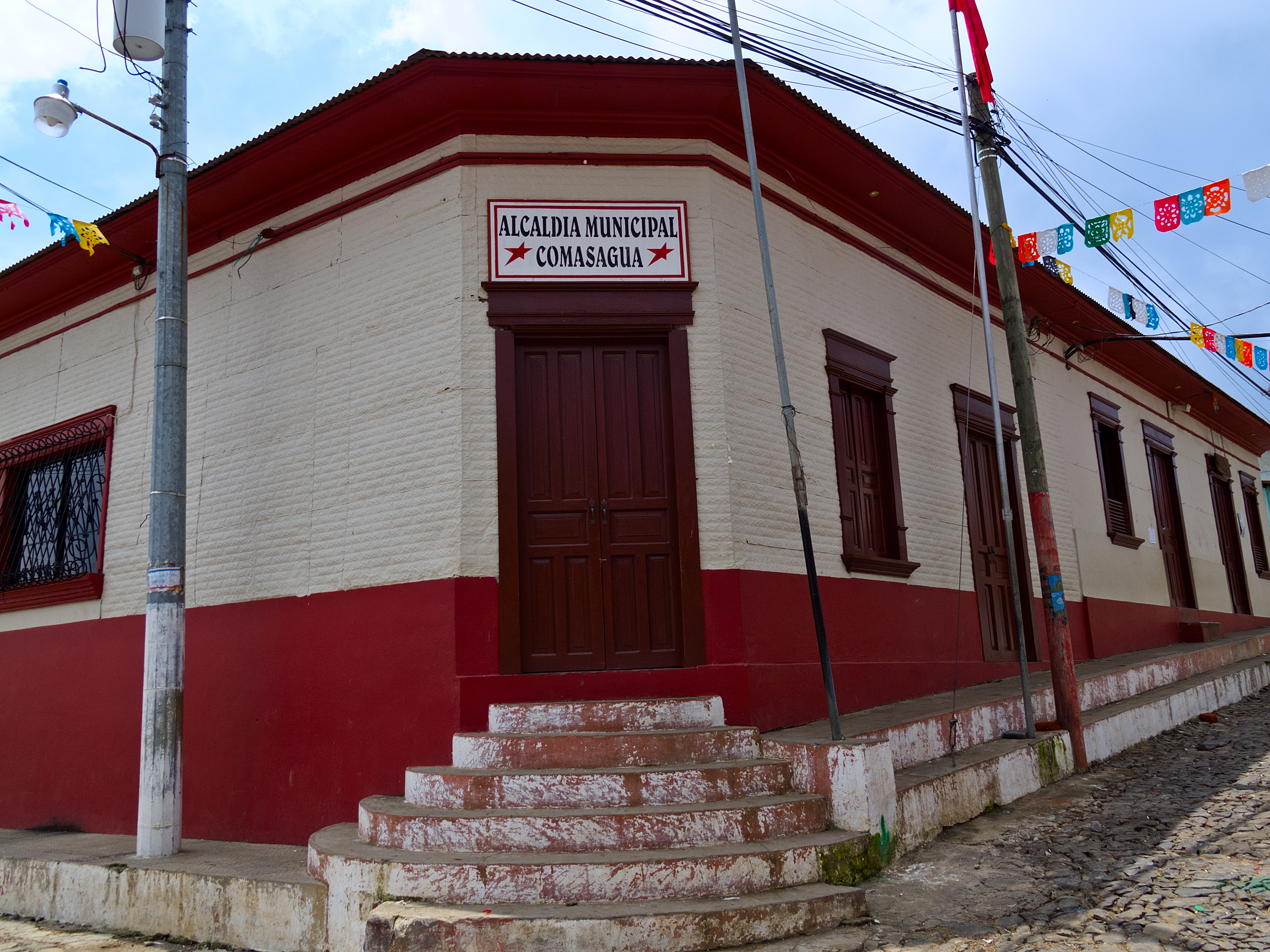
Town hall of Comasagua
