= Felipe Codallos =

Mexican general (1790–1849)

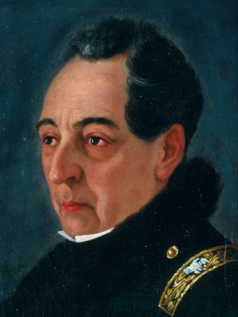
- Detail from Agustín Arrieta's Familia del general don Felipe Codallos, 1838

Governor of Puebla
- In office 18 February 1837 – 1840
- Preceded by: José Antonio Mozo
- Succeeded by: Juan González Cabofranco

Political Chief of San Salvador
- In office 7 May 1823 – 25 May 1823
- Preceded by: Vicente Filísola
- Succeeded by: Consultive Junta

Captain General of Central America
- In office 22 November 1822 – 7 March 1823
- Monarch: Agustín I
- Preceded by: Vicente Filísola
- Succeeded by: Vicente Filísola

Personal details
- Born: Felipe Codallos Núñez; 1790 Captaincy General of Venezuela, Spanish Empire
- Died: 1849 (aged 58–59) Mexico City, Mexico
- Occupation: Military officer

Military service
- Allegiance: Spanish Empire; First Mexican Empire; First Mexican Republic
- Branch/service: Mexican Army
- Years of service: 1801–1849
- Rank: Division general
- Battles/wars: Mexican War of Independence; Mexican annexation of Central America; Spanish attempts to reconquer Mexico; Capitulation of San Juan de Ulúa

Felipe Codallos Núñez (1790–1849) was a Mexican army officer. A royalist cadet, he joined the Army of the Three Guarantees in 1821 and served as Vicente Filísola's deputy during the Mexican occupation of Central America, first as captain general and then as political and military chief of the Province of San Salvador. After the collapse of the First Mexican Empire, he returned to Mexico, took part in the 1825 capture of San Juan de Ulúa, the last Spanish stronghold in continental America, held successive military commands and rose to the highest military rank in the Mexican Army. He governed the Department of Puebla from 1837 to 1840.

== Early life and Mexican War of Independence ==
Codallos was born in 1790. His birthplace is disputed. Service-record summaries place it in Trinidad, either the island then attached to the Captaincy General of Venezuela, or Trinidad de Barlovento on the Venezuelan coast.

He was the brother of Juan José Codallos, the federalist military officer supporter of President Vicente Guerrero who was executed at Pátzcuaro in 1831. Juan José's will named their father as Felipe Codallos and their mother as Andrea de Ponce. Historian Josefina Zoraida Vázquez, citing Felipe's hoja de servicio, identified the father as a Spanish military officer.

He entered the army of New Spain as a cadet at Campeche in February 1801 and served the viceregal government through the Mexican War of Independence.

On 21 February 1821 Codallos was among the first units to join Agustín de Iturbide and Vicente Guerrero's Army of the Three Guarantees. Under the Plan of Iguala and the Treaty of Córdoba, that army entered Mexico City on 27 September 1821 and independence was declared the next day as the Mexican Empire. Iturbide was proclaimed emperor in May 1822.

== Mexican Empire ==
=== Central America, 1822–1823 ===
After independence from Spain in September 1821 the former Kingdom of Guatemala divided over union with Mexico. A consultation of ayuntamientos produced a majority for annexation; on 5 January 1822 the junta in Guatemala City declared the kingdom part of the First Mexican Empire. San Salvador rejected that act and kept its own government.

Brigadier Vicente Filísola's auxiliary division was dispatched to the region to secure the union already proclaimed. Codallos went as Filísola's second. They entered Guatemala City on 12 June 1822; Filísola took the captaincy from Gabino Gaínza later that month.

On 10 September 1822 Codallos and Lieutenant Colonel Luis González Ojeda signed Filísola's armistice with Salvadoran commissioners Antonio José Cañas and Juan Francisco Sosa; Emperor Iturbide later disallowed the agreement and ordered Filísola to occupy San Salvador.

From 22 November 1822 to 7 March 1823, while Filísola campaigned against San Salvador, Codallos, stationed in Guatemala City, held the captaincy. Filísola occupied San Salvador on 9 February 1823.

Meanwhile in Mexico the Casa Mata Plan Revolution had forced Iturbide's abdication in March 1823. Filísola left San Salvador for Guatemala City and on 7 May 1823 named Codallos political and military chief of the Province of San Salvador.

On 25 May 1823 the ayuntamiento and population of San Salvador rose, armed themselves, and forced Codallos and about 500 Mexican and Guatemalan soldiers to evacuate the city. A 19th-century account adds that Codallos had already asked to be relieved and that Sergeant Major José Justo Milla, who replaced him, ordered the garrison out after friction with the town. A Consultive Junta took civil power: Mariano Prado as supreme political chief, Milla as intendant and Colonel José Rivas as military commander. Codallos withdrew to Mexico.

== Mexican Republic ==
=== Commands in republican Mexico ===
In 1824 Codallos was appointed commander general of Querétaro and quartermaster. In January 1825 he took the 6.º batallón and the military command of the plaza of Campeche, then a port of the State of Yucatán, which still covered the whole peninsula. Late in 1826 he was raised to commander general of the whole state. After a conflict with Governor José Tiburcio López Constante over funds for troops he had put on a war footing, the national government relieved him. In 1825 he took part in the Mexican capture of the Spanish fortress of San Juan de Ulúa, the last Spanish hold on the continent; the land and naval commands of that siege were held by Miguel Barragán and Pedro Sainz de Baranda. He later held the commander-generalcy of Mexico City, San Luis Potosí, and Puebla.

On 18 August 1830, as military commander of the Mexico City garrison, he was an author and signatory of the Exposición de las tropas de la guarnición de la capital. Contemporary narrative histories describe him as a firm supporter of the government installed after the overthrow of Vicente Guerrero, in sharp contrast to his brother Juan José.

=== Puebla governorship ===
On 18 February 1837 Codallos became governor of the Department of Puebla, a centralist appointment under the Siete Leyes. He held the post until 1840.

On 1 December 1838, during the Pastry War, he issued a manifesto to the inhabitants of Puebla on the French blockade under Rear Admiral Charles Baudin. Museum catalogues credit his administration with laying the first stone of the state penitentiary.

=== Death ===
Codallos died in Mexico City in 1849.

== Family portrait ==
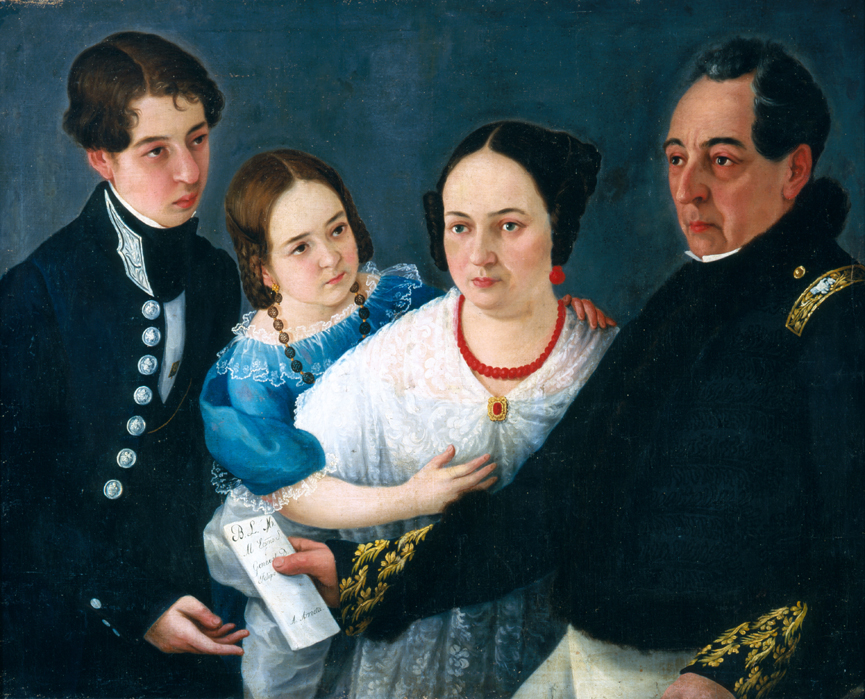
Familia del general don Felipe Codallos. by Agustín Arrieta. Codallos is depicted with his wife and children; the letter he holds reads: Al Exmo. General Don Felipe

In 1838 Agustín Arrieta painted Familia del general don Felipe Codallos, an oil on canvas (99.4 × 79.6 cm) now in Museo Soumaya, Plaza Carso. The picture shows Codallos with his wife and children and is dated to the year of his promotion to general de división.

== See also ==
- First Mexican Empire
- Central America under Mexican rule
- Vicente Filísola
- Pastry War
- Agustín Arrieta

Political offices
Preceded by Vicente Filísola	Captain General of Guatemala; 1822–1823	Succeeded by Vicente Filísola
Preceded by Vicente Filísola	Political Chief of San Salvador; 1823	Succeeded by Consultive Junta
