= Battle of Membrillar =

1814 battle of the Chilean War of Independence

- Part of the Chilean War of Independence
Date	20 March 1814
Location	Membrillar, Itata River
Result	Patriot victory

Belligerents
Chile; United Provinces	Viceroyalty of Peru

Commanders and leaders
Juan Mackenna	Gabino Gaínza

Strength
Unknown	Unknown

Casualties and losses
Unknown	Unknown

The Battle of Membrillar occurred on 20 March 1814, during the War of Chilean Independence.

== Background ==
Prior to the fall of Talca in early March, Juan Mackenna had been positioned along the Itata river with a small division of patriot troops, whilst Bernardo O'Higgins had remained with the main body of the army in Concepción. After Talca fell to Royalist forces, however, Mackenna realised his lines of communication with O'Higgins were now cut and that he was isolated. Mackenna, the colonel of engineers on the patriot General Staff, formed a solid defensive position, building three mutually supporting bastions on local hills on the north bank of the Itata river near Membrillar. The Royalist commander, Gabino Gaínza, had sent a vanguard of 400 men into the hills of Quilo, south of the Itata river, to prevent the two patriot commanders from reuniting. This force had been defeated in the Battle of El Quilo on the 19 March, forcing Gaínza to attempt a different plan. Gaínza instead decided to attack Mackenna's forces immediately, before then turning on O'Higgins. Chillán sent additional reinforcements, and Gaínza then crossed the Itata to attack.

== The battle ==
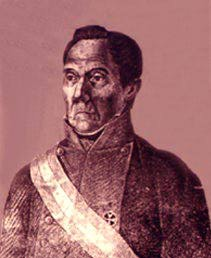
Gabino Gaínza y Fernández, the Royalist commander

The battle began on 20 March in chaos. A misinterpreted order resulted in confused skirmishes breaking out between the forward units of both armies. The Royalist forces made a disorganised assault on the Patriot trenches surrounding the field by the village of Membrillar; this attack was repelled and immediately the Royalist officer Manuel Barañao led a second attack, this time on the central positions held by Mackenna. Mackenna's forces held and he sent a counter-attack against the Royalists, comprising units led by Santiago Bueras, Hilario Vidal, Agustín Almanza and Balcarce Marks, driving Barañao's forces back. The Royalists continued their waves of attacks for several hours, but all were repulsed. When night fell, the driving rain and the dark encouraged the Royalists to retreat from the field.

== Aftermath ==
In the morning, Mackenna did not realise how much damage he had inflicted on the Royalists and instead focused on repairing the damage to his fortifications, expecting another attack. As a result, Gabino Gaínza was able to regroup and reorganise his forces.
