= Pedro María de Anaya =

Mexican general and interim president (1794–1854)

Pedro María Anaya
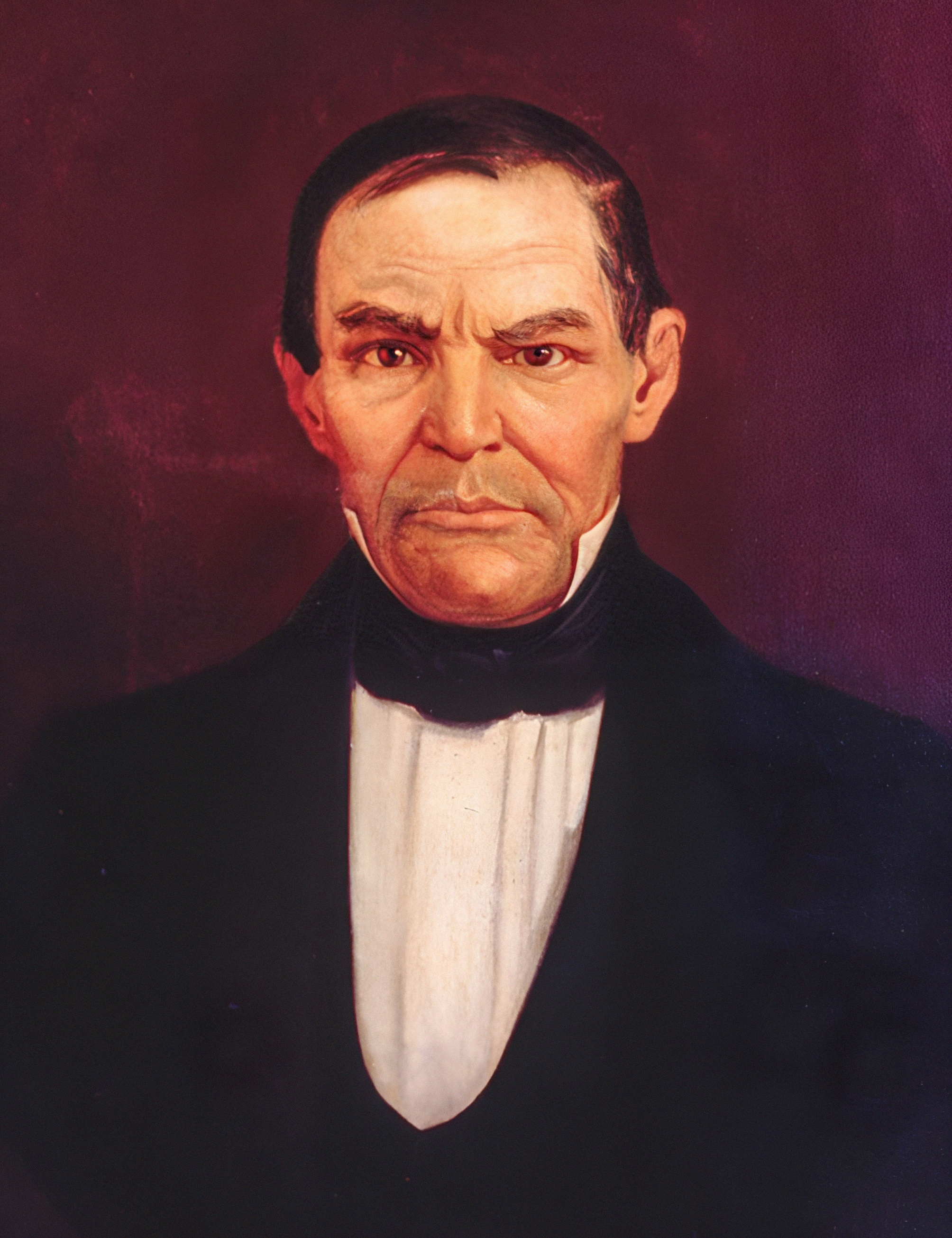
- Portrait of Pedro María de Anaya

17th President of Mexico
- In office 13 November 1847 – 8 January 1848
- Preceded by: Manuel de la Peña y Peña
- Succeeded by: Manuel de la Peña y Peña
- In office 2 April 1847 – 20 May 1847
- Preceded by: Antonio López de Santa Anna
- Succeeded by: Antonio López de Santa Anna

Minister of War and the Navy
- In office 22 September 1852 – 8 January 1853
- President: Mariano Arista; Juan Bautista Ceballos
- Preceded by: Manuel de María y Sandoval
- Succeeded by: Santiago Blanco Duque de Estrada
- In office 9 January 1848 – 2 June 1848
- President: Manuel de la Peña y Peña
- Preceded by: Ignacio Mora y Villamil
- Succeeded by: Manuel de María y Sandoval
- In office 15 August 1845 – 30 December 1845
- President: José Joaquín de Herrera
- Preceded by: Pedro García Conde
- Succeeded by: Juan Nepomuceno Almonte

Governor of the Federal District
- In office 10 July 1849 – 31 December 1849
- Preceded by: Pedro Jorrín
- Succeeded by: Miguel María de Azcárate

President of the Chamber of Deputies
- In office 30 October 1830 – 30 November 1830
- Preceded by: José Antonio Sastre
- Succeeded by: Andrés Quintana Roo

Personal details
- Born: 20 May 1794 Huichapan, Kingdom of Mexico Viceroyalty of New Spain (now Hidalgo, Mexico)
- Died: 21 March 1854 (aged 59) Mexico City, Mexico
- Party: Liberal

Military service
- Allegiance: Spain; Three Guarantees; Mexico
- Branch/service: Mexican Army
- Years of service: 1811–1854
- Rank: Brigadier general
- Battles/wars: Mexican War of Independence; Mexican Annexation of Central America; Battle of Mejicanos; Spanish attempts to reconquer Mexico; Battle of Tampico; Mexican–American War; Battle of Churubusco

Pedro Bernardino María de Anaya y Álvarez (20 May 1794 – 21 March 1854) was a Mexican general and liberal politician who served twice as interim president of Mexico during the Mexican–American War. He began his career in the royalist army, joined the Army of the Three Guarantees in 1821, and served in Vicente Filísola’s expedition that occupied the former Captaincy General of Guatemala for the First Mexican Empire. Between his two presidencies he commanded Mexican troops at the Battle of Churubusco.

== Early life ==
Anaya was born in Huichapan in the modern-day state of Hidalgo on 20 May 1794 and baptized the next day as Pedro Bernardino Anaya y de Álvarez. His parents were Pedro José Anaya y Maldonado and María Antonia de Álvarez, both Spanish criollos. After primary schooling he studied philosophy and theology with a view to the priesthood, then left that path for a military career.

== Royalist service and independence ==
He entered the royalist army in 1811 as a cadet in the Regimiento de Tres Villas, after the Mexican War of Independence had already begun. He rose to captain on 31 August 1819 and, according to later biographical summaries, fought in some twenty actions with his hometown company, the Dragones de la Sierra Gorda, on the Spanish side.

On 20 June 1821 he adhered to the Plan of Iguala and passed to the Army of the Three Guarantees, with which he entered Mexico City at the consummation of independence. One account places him in the Trigarante action at the hacienda of La Huerta, near Toluca.

== Filísola expedition and Central America, 1822–1823 ==
After independence Anaya was assigned to the Mexican force sent under General Vicente Filísola into the former Captaincy General of Guatemala. The Junta Consultiva of Guatemala had declared annexation to the Mexican Empire on 5 January 1822. The Mexican Congress sanctioned the union on 10 July 1822. Filísola’s so-called División Auxiliar entered Guatemala City on 12 June 1822 to take over from Gabino Gaínza and to enforce the annexation against republican resistance, especially in San Salvador.

Anaya served as a captain. In late August 1822, during a dispute over ceremonial seating in Guatemala Cathedral, Filísola had the young captain represent the División Auxiliar at the commemoration of independence. In an incidental but documented trace of Anaya’s presence in Central America. He was named squadron commander on 17 January 1823. Filísola occupied San Salvador on 9 February 1823, then, after Iturbide’s fall, convened a Central American congress that declared separation from Mexico on 1 July 1823. Filísola requested relief of his commands; the Mexican government had already authorised the division’s return. The Mexican forces left Guatemala City on 3 August 1823.

== Early republican career ==
Anaya was promoted to lieutenant colonel in 1828 and elected deputy to the Chamber of Deputies for the State of Mexico from 1828 to 1830. He served briefly as president of the Chamber in 1829 during the session that voted extraordinary powers to President Vicente Guerrero, and again from 30 October to 30 November 1830.

In 1829 he took part in the campaign against the Spanish Barradas Expedition at Tampico alongside Antonio López de Santa Anna and was brevetted colonel. That December, as commandant-general of Mexico City, he headed the defence of the National Palace on 23 December 1829 against the conservative revolt that overthrew the provisional government of José María Bocanegra, but could not prevent its fall.

He took leave from the army for health in 1831, returned in 1832, was confirmed colonel in 1833, given command of the National Palace garrison, and brevetted brigadier general the same year during the presidency of Valentín Gómez Farías, a promotion later described as a reward for loyalty to the liberal party. He then moved into civilian office as postmaster general. After being removed he spent most of the centralist decade without employment. A colonel’s pension was restored in 1841; in 1843–1844 and again in 1846 he headed the Battalion of Invalids. He sat in the Senate in 1844–1845 and presided over that chamber from 28 December 1844 to 31 January 1845.

== Minister of War, 1845 ==
Under President José Joaquín de Herrera he was Minister of War and the Navy from August to December 1845, a post from which ministers were then resigning in quick succession because popular opinion favored war with the United States while Herrera preferred a more moderate course. On 2 December 1845, answering a request from Foreign Minister Manuel de la Peña y Peña, Anaya submitted a readiness memorandum that treated reconquest of the disputed northern lands as the military object and listed the battalions and guns he judged necessary for Alta and Baja California. After Herrera’s fall in December 1845 Anaya left public office, opposing the policies of President Mariano Paredes.

When Gómez Farías returned to power in 1847, Anaya was president of Congress and signed Gómez Farías’s controversial wartime decree nationalizing church property.

== First presidency ==
When the Revolt of the Polkos broke out, Anaya stood behind Gómez Farías. Santa Anna returned to broker a settlement, deposed Gómez Farías, and had Anaya named substitute president while he went to face the American landing at Veracruz. Congress elected him on 1 April 1847; he took the oath that same day.

Anaya was authorized to place the capital under a state of siege and spent the term trying to overcome the issues that blocked a united war effort, with states resisting contributions and making separate bargains with one another. After the Battle of Cerro Gordo, in which the Americans broke the defenses on the road to Mexico City, Congress granted the president extraordinary faculties but withheld the power to make a peace treaty or alienate national territory, and declared anyone who negotiated with the Americans a traitor. A commission was created to legislate if Congress could not sit. On 2 April Anaya convened a junta on whether the capital should be defended if there was no reasonable chance of holding it. Supply and budget problems were laid out and the cabinet endorsed guerrilla warfare. When Santa Anna returned to the capital, Anaya surrendered the presidency to him.

== Battle of Churubusco ==
Anaya then took a field command. At the head of a brigade, and together with General Manuel Rincón and the Saint Patrick's Battalion, he helped defend the convent and bridge of Churubusco on 20 August 1847 on the southern approaches to Mexico City. Mexican accounts credit him with helping to throw back American forces. He was burned in an artillery explosion. After the ammunition was exhausted the position was surrendered and he was taken prisoner. When U.S. General David E. Twiggs asked for the remaining munitions, Anaya replied, "Si hubiera parque, no estaría usted aquí" (“If I had any ammunition, you would not be here”).

He was released after the armistice between Santa Anna and Winfield Scott. As the government and Congress moved to Querétaro, he was again named president.

== Second presidency ==
Upon taking office he declared his support for the federal system as the only one fit to meet the crisis, warning that constitutional experiments at that moment would deliver Mexico to its enemies, and promised that persons and property would be protected. He took military precautions on a rumor that Scott would push on toward San Luis Potosí. Congress forbade public officials to seize private property, freed the cultivation of tobacco, tried to dissolve the general commandancies, and named Aguascalientes as an alternate seat of government if the Americans took Querétaro. A minority of deputies refused any negotiation that involved territorial cession; lack of quorum then cut the sessions short. Empty magazines, empty treasuries, and the loss of the capital made continuation of the war increasingly unreal.

The legislature of the State of Mexico asked that no peace be signed before the states were heard, and each legislature was to name two commissioners. Governor Ramón Adame of San Luis Potosí called for the war to continue. Guerrilla bands were already forming in the countryside. Anaya made a demonstration with the troops still under his hand, numbered in one account at sixteen thousand. Governors gathered at Querétaro without agreeing on a course. The Congress of Chihuahua suggested letting the United States take sparsely populated northern districts that were already being raided by independent Indian nations, in return for help closing the arms-and-plunder trade on the frontier.

Ending the tobacco monopoly removed a large piece of federal revenue. Under the law that had named him interim president, the term ended on 8 January 1848. Anaya handed the office back to Peña y Peña and became Minister of War, following that administration through the close of the war and the Treaty of Guadalupe Hidalgo. After the treaty the government returned to Mexico City.

== Later life ==
He was again Minister of War under Peña y Peña in 1848, governor of the Federal District from 10 July to 31 December 1849, and postmaster general in 1848–1849 and 1850–1852. He sat on the Mexico City municipal council in 1851 and, as director general of posts from 1852 to 1854, was once more Minister of War under Mariano Arista from September 1852. He remained a few days under President Juan Bautista Ceballos and resigned as another coup prepared Santa Anna’s return. Santa Anna nevertheless kept him as postmaster. Anaya died in Mexico City on 21 March 1854 after an attack of pneumonia that killed him within hours; an obituary appeared in El Siglo Diez y Nueve the next day.

== See also ==
- List of heads of state of Mexico
- Central America under Mexican rule
- Battle of Churubusco
- Revolt of the Polkos

Political offices
Preceded by Antonio López de Santa Anna	President of Mexico; 2 April – 20 May 1847	Succeeded by Antonio López de Santa Anna
Preceded by Manuel de la Peña y Peña	President of Mexico; 13 November 1847 – 8 January 1848	Succeeded by Manuel de la Peña y Peña
