= Battle of Ayutuxtepeque (1823) =

Battle fought during the Filisola campaign in El Salvador between 1823

- Part of Filísola's campaign in El Salvador
Date	7 February 1823
Location	Ayutuxtepeque, El Salvador
Result	Mexican victory

Belligerents
Mexico	El Salvador

Commanders and leaders
(Mexico) Vicente Filísola (Mexico) Cayetano Bosque	(El Salvador) Antonio Cañas (El Salvador) Fernando Alcolsa †

Casualties and losses
Unknown	Unknown

The Battle of Ayutuxtepeque took place during Filisola's campaign in El Salvador, it was a battle led by imperial troops under the command of Vicente Filísola, the Salvadoran troops under the command of Antonio José Cañas which ended in a Salvadoran defeat.

== Background ==
On February 6, at night, they stealthily occupied the poorly defended fortifications of Milingo (today Delgado) and El Volcán.

=== Battle of El Atajo ===
Battle of El Atajo
- Part of Filísola's campaign in El Salvador
Date	7 February 1823
Location	El Atajo, El Salvador
Result	Mexican victory

Belligerents
(Mexico) Mexican Empire	El Salvador

Commanders and leaders
(Mexico) Vicente Filísola (Mexico) Fernando Cortázar	(El Salvador) Máximo Cordero

Strength
250 - 300	100

Casualties and losses
Unknown	Unknown

On February 7, the Salvadoran forces led by Maximo Cordero and the Mexican forces, led by Vicente Filísola and Francisco Cortázar, engaged in combat in El Atajo where they were rejected 2 times until Colonel Cortázar arrived and after 2 hours of combat he seized the Salvadoran trenches.

== The battle ==
After the combat at El Atajo, he vigorously attacked Ayutuxtepeque. During this combat, Captain Fernando de Alcolsa was killed by a grenade. Colonel Antonio José Cañas could not contain the invasion ending in a Mexican victory, the Salvadorans were forced to retreat to Mejicanos.

== Aftermath ==
After this, Filísola's forces attacked Callejon del Diablo which was poorly defended by 20 Salvadorans. After 2 hours of combat, the position was taken. Vicente Filísola followed through Mejicanos, where the Salvadorans were completely defeated, after this on February 9, Filísola entered in San Salvador and declared it annexed to the First Mexican Empire.

== See also ==
- Central America under Mexican rule
- Battle of Mejicanos (1823)
