= Capitulation of Gualcince =

Battle fought during the Filisola campaign in El Salvador in 1823

- Part of the Mexican annexation of El Salvador and Filísola's campaign in El Salvador
Date	21 February 1823
Location	Gualcince, Honduras
Result	Mexican victory: End of the War with El Salvador

Belligerents
(Mexico) Mexican Empire	El Salvador

Commanders and leaders
(Mexico) Vicente Filísola	(El Salvador) Manuel Arce (surrendered) (El Salvador) Mariano Prado (surrendered) (El Salvador) Rafael Castillo (surrendered) (El Salvador) Feliciano Viviani (surrendered)

Strength
Unknown	Unknown

Casualties and losses
Unknown	Unknown

The Capitulation of Gualcince occurred during the Mexican annexation of El Salvador, on February 21, 1823, when Vicente Filísola after occupying San Salvador continued with a division and forced him to surrender his weapons and surrender.

== Background ==
Before the fall of San Salvador, the army evacuated the city, under the command of Colonel Antonio José Cañas; General Manuel José Arce was carried in a bunk, due to his serious illness. In the city of Olocuilta, the Salvadoran Army organizes and forms a War Junta, which decided to go to the city of Granada to help the anti-imperialists, gave command of the troop Colonel Antonio José Cañas, appointing Colonel Feliciano Viviani as Second Chief; they evacuated the city and went to Honduras through Zacatecoluca.

== The capitulation ==
After Vicente Filísola captured San Salvador he continued with a division after the Salvadoran force under the command of Antonio José Cañas, Rafael Castillo and Mariano Prado after a short combat the Salvadorans were forced to surrender and capitulate to the Mexicans in the Town of Gualcince. There Filísola not only issued and officers who wanted to leave the province in this way ended the war with El Salvador.

== Aftermath ==
Arce went to the United States of the North, and from the British establishment of Belize he wrote to Filisola thanking him for his human and generous behavior; but without denying by his expressions the firmness and dignity of his character Delgado remained in a hacienda.

On March 6 the Brigadier Vicente Filísola appoints Colonel Felipe Codallos, Mayor and Governor of the province of El Salvador, and leaves for Guatemala.

== See also ==
- Central America under Mexican rule
