= Battle of El Quilo =

Battle of el Quilo
- Part of the Chilean War of Independence
Date	19 March 1814
Location	El Quilo, Ránquil, near Ñipas
Result	Patriot victory

Belligerents
Chilean patriots	Royalists

Commanders and leaders
Bernardo O'Higgins	Manuel Barañao

Strength
Greater than 400	400

Casualties and losses
Unknown	Unknown

The Battle of El Quilo, fought during the Chilean War of Independence, occurred at el Quilo, on the southern bank of the Itata river, on 19 March 1814.

== Background ==
By January 1814, Royalist forces had received reinforcements from the Viceroy of Peru and had taken the Patriot stronghold of Talca in March. This had split the line of communication between the two main Patriot armies, led by Bernardo O'Higgins and Juan Mackenna respectively. Gabino Gaínza, the Royalist commander, sent Manuel Barañao with a vanguard of troops, some 400 strong, across the Itata river to prevent O'Higgins from reuniting his army with Mackenna's, resulting in the Battle of El Quilo.

== Battle ==
Barañao's force comprised around 400 men and had been placed in defensive positions on the south side of the Itata river, supported by the main body of Gaínza's men on the other side. O'Higgins immediately launched an attack without pausing to assess the situation, relying on his larger force and aggression. Barañao's men did not receive reinforcements from Gaínza during the battle and were forced to retreat from their positions.

== Aftermath ==
Concerned that if he pursued Barañao, the Royalist commanders would recombine their forces and defeat him, O'Higgins instead entrenched his existing position and stayed on his bank of the river. In turn, the Royalist forces turned north across the river against the forces of Mackenna, leading to the Battle of Membrillar a few days later.
