= Revolt of the Polkos =

Coup d'état in Mexico (1847)

- Part of Mexican–American War
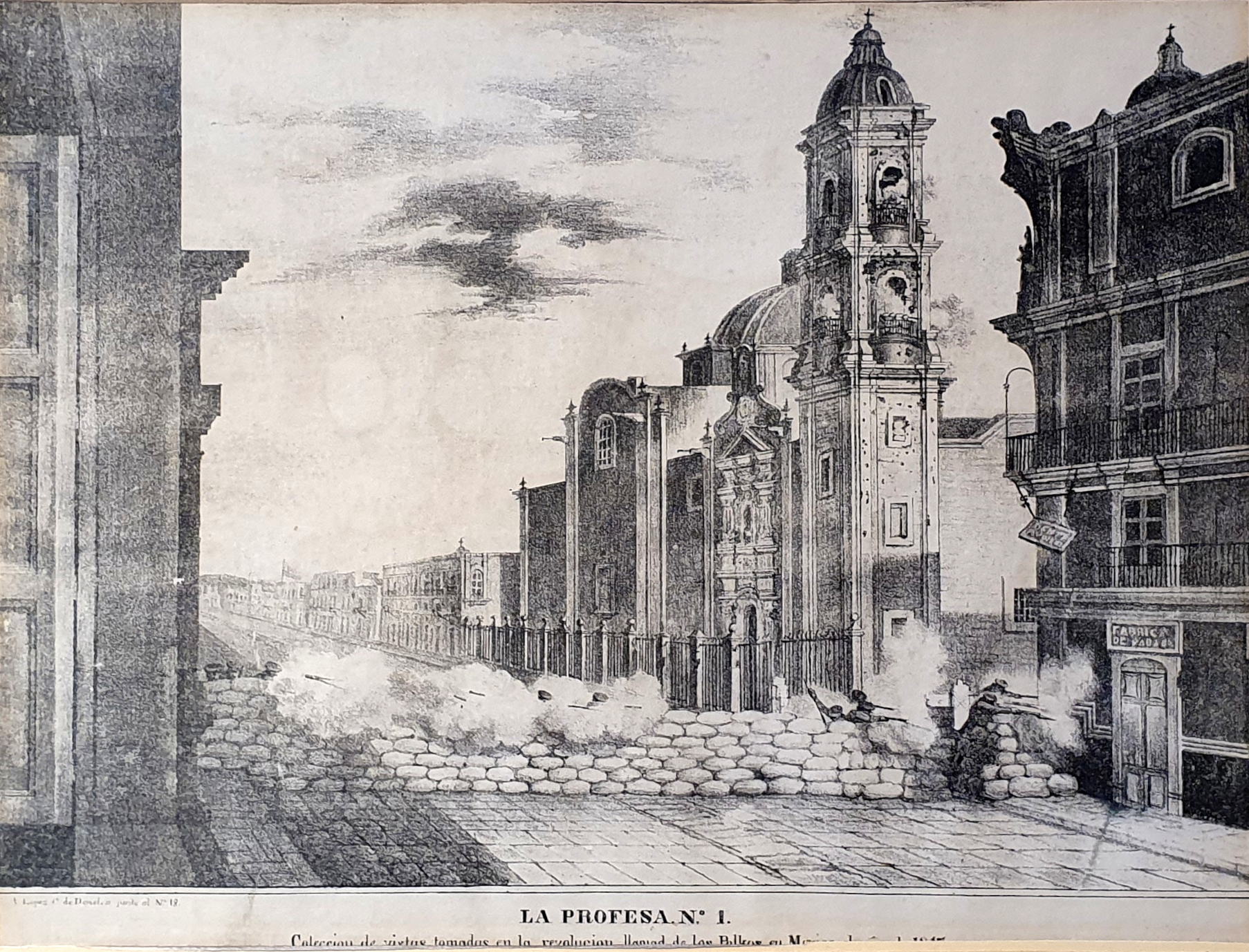
- Combats in front of "La Profesa" church
Date	February 26 – March 23, 1847
Location	Mexico City, Mexico
Result	President Valentín Gómez Farías is deposed.

Belligerents
Mexico (Rebels)	Mexico (Government)

Commanders and leaders
Matías Peña y Barragán; José Mariano Salas; Pedro María de Anaya	Valentín Gómez Farías; Antonio López de Santa Anna

The Revolt of the Polkos was a coup d'état in Mexico that was launched on February 27, 1847, during the Mexican-American War. The coup was initiated by militias stationed at the Mexican capital with the aim of overthrowing President Valentín Gómez Farías. It would eventually succeed, and Gómez Farías was replaced by Pedro María de Anaya.

It was the second successful coup that Mexico experienced during the Mexican-American War, and Gómez Farías himself had ascended to the presidency in the aftermath of the fall of President Mariano Paredes, who was overthrown in August 1846 for his poor handling of the war. It was also the second non-consecutive time that Gómez Farías was serving as President of Mexico. He had been president in 1833 during which he had attempted to pass many anti-clerical measures.

As the government was struggling to finance the war, the Gómez Farías administration in January, 1847 decided upon nationalizing church lands and selling them to the amount of fifteen million pesos. The measure was met with difficulties and controversy, with conservatives fearing the revival of the 1833 anticlerical campaign, and moderate liberals questioning the effectiveness of such a controversial decree. Violent resistance throughout the country began in January, but it was not until February 27 that the Revolt of the Polkos broke out in the capital. Polkos was a term used to refer to the middle class professionals that made up the militias involved in the revolt.

Meanwhile Santa Anna was returning to Mexico City from the Battle of Buena Vista to focus on Winfield Scott's expedition at Veracruz. He received news of the revolt en route, and eventually took the role of arbitrator, siding with the rebels and deposing Gómez Farías.

== Background ==
The Mexican American War began under the presidency of Mariano Paredes, who, after suffering catastrophic losses throughout the north of the country and ending with American troops under Zachary Taylor, ensconced as far as Saltillo, was overthrown in August 1846. José Mariano Salas became interim president.

He also engaged in constitutional reform by restoring the federalist Constitution of 1824, after a decade of crises culminating in the war had discredited the Centralist Republic of Mexico and led to a resurgence of support for the old constitution. The former dictator Santa Anna proclaimed his support for the federal system and was invited back into the country to help the war effort. New presidential elections were held in December 1846 and were won by Santa Anna and Valentín Gómez Farías, who would precede to share power. Both men had already ruled together in 1833 during which a controversial anticlerical campaign had been carried out, culminating in Santa Anna switching sides and overthrowing Gómez Farías.

The government was struggling to finance the war, a problem worsened by corruption in the finance ministry, which did not inspire confidence when the government proposed an audit of property owners. On January 7, 1847, a measure was introduced to congress that was signed by four of five members of a financial ministry commission, who endorsed the seizure of fifteen million pesos from the church by nationalizing and then selling its lands, which in turn alarmed Gómez Farías’ opponents into fearing that he was reviving the anti-clerical campaign of 1833.

The decree was signed by President of Congress Pedro María de Anaya, and Gómez Farías approved it with the support of Finance Minister Zubieta. The latter was given instructions to avoid any fraud, or hiding of wealth that would impede the efficacy of the measure. Tenants on church lands were to be fined if they did not hand over their rent to government agents, instead of the church. Minister of Relations José Fernando Ramírez recommended the application of the relevant Indian laws in anticipation of political agitation in the churches. Minister of War Valentín Canalizo urged the utmost severity in enforcing laws against those upsetting the public order.

Local opposition to the decree was more marked. The legislatures of Queretaro, Puebla, and Guanajuato petitioned congress to nullify the decree. The State of Durango refused to enforce it, and the State of Queretaro proposed an alternative plan to fund the war effort. Tenants who lived on church lands were also resistant to the enforcement of the decree.

The liberal paper El Monitor Republicano was incredulous that of all available options for raising funds, the government had chosen to nationalize church lands in the middle of a war without sounding public opinion, and it reminded its readers that the last time Gómez Farías had tried to nationalize church lands in 1833, it ended with the overthrow of the liberal government.

Ramirez resigned after clashes with the cabinet, including difficulties in finding buyers of church lands. On January 26, President Gómez Farías named a junta charged with carrying out the sales of church lands. The legal secretaries Cuevas and Mendez were fined for not wishing to participate. A measure was taken to audit the finance ministry to reduce corruption in general, and the relevant officials were also obliged to present a report every four days on the progress of the church land sales and to explain any factors that were causing any delays.

At the same time, developments on the battlefield also affected the political situation in Mexico. Although the Battle of Buena Vista ended in a stalemate, Santa Anna's retreat was perceived as an American victory and intensified domestic tensions. Soon afterward, several states refused to implement the January laws. When news of the defeat and the subsequent revolts reached Mexico City, clerical and conservative elites launched the Revolt of the Polkos against the government's confiscatory laws.

There were demonstrations in the capital as early as January 15t but the government was obstinate in carrying out its policy of nationalizing church lands. The Oaxaca garrison pronounced against the government on February 21. Mazatlán followed, and much as when there had been revolts against the first presidency of Gómez Farías, the rebels began to call for Santa Anna, with whom Gómez Farías was sharing power, to take over the government.

Meanwhile, peaceful opposition against the nationalization law continued. The liberal deputy Mariano Otero protested the measure, and the new finance minister, José Luis Huici, refused to sign it.

== Rebellion ==
Sensing that members of the newly-formed national guard at the capital were not sympathetic to the government, Gomez Farias tried to move them to locations in which they would not be a threat to the government. He intended to move the Independence Battalion away from the University of Mexico, located next to the National Palace. He sent on February 24 troops who were led by his own son to expel the Independence Battalion from their temporary barracks. The battalion was a militia that was made up of middle class professionals, and their expulsion from the city threatened the livelihoods of their families. That resulted in protest and outrage, followed by the arrest of certain members of the Independence Battalion.

On February 27, five national guard battalions proclaimed against the government. They released a manifesto excoriating the government for pursuing a divisive policy, instead of uniting the country in the war effort and seeking a means of funding the military that was backed by national consensus. That came to be known as the Revolt of the Polkos because the young middle-class men who made up the militias stationed throughout the capital were known for dancing the polka. The rebels were joined by General José Mariano Salas, who had already played a role during the war of overthrowing President Mariano Paredes. General Matías de la Peña Barragán, the chief of the rebels. met with Valentín Canalizo on February 30 and negotiated on the matter of an arrangement, with Pena insisting on the deposition of Gomez Farias. The negotiations came to nothing, and the revolt continued.

Meanwhile, news arrived that Santa Anna had won the Battle of Buena Vista, which took place on February 22 to February 23, but in reality, it had been a draw. Santa Anna was heading back to Mexico City to arrange defenses against the forces of Winfield Scott, who had just landed at Veracruz. He was at the town of Matehuala, on the way from Angostura, to San Luis Potosi, when received news that there had been a revolution against the government of Gómez Farías.

Upon arrival in San Luis Potosi on March 10, he wrote two letters, one to Gómez Farías and one to Peña Barragán, in which he ordered them to suspend hostilities. They did so and awaited the arrival and the arbitration of Santa Anna On his way to the capital, he was met by representatives from both sides of the conflict who hoped to sway him to their cause. On March 21, representatives of the Congress including Mariano Otero and José María Lafragua, set out to present Santa Anna with an offer to assume the presidency. He continued receiving representatives of various interests and was congratulated for his "victory" at Buena Vista. Ignacio Trigueros was named new governor of the federal district, and Pedro María de Anaya was named the new commandant general.

In the peace settlement, Congress abolished the office of vice president, thereby removing Gómez Farías from office, and named Pedro María de Anaya as the new president.

== Sources ==
- Conway, Christopher, and Gustavo Pellon. The U.S.-Mexican War: A Binational Reader. Hackett Publishing, 2010, 116.
- Costeloe, Michael P. "The Mexican Church and the Rebellion of the Polkos." The Hispanic American Historical Review 46, no. 2 (May 1, 1966): 170–178.
- Fowler, Will. Santa Anna of Mexico. Lincoln: University of Nebraska Press 2007.
- Frazier, Donald. The United States and Mexico at War: Nineteenth-Century Expansionism and Conflict. New York: Macmillan Reference USA, 1998, 329.
- Heidler, David Stephen, and Jeanne T. Heidler. The Mexican War. Greenwood Publishing Group, 2006, 113-115.
- Howe, Daniel Walker. What Hath God Wrought: The Transformation of America, 1815–1848. New York: Oxford University Press US, 2007, 781–782.
- MacLachlan, Colin M., and William H. Beezley. Mexico's Crucial Century, 1810–1910: An Introduction. Lincoln, NE: University of Nebraska Press, 2011, 62–74.
- Santoni, Pedro. Mexicans at Arms: Puro Federalists and the Politics of War, 1845–1848. Fort Worth: Texas Christian University Press, 1996, 182–195.
