= Consultive Junta (El Salvador) =

Salvadoran provisional government

Consultive Junta Junta Consultiva
- Military junta
- Formation: 25 May 1823
- Extinction: 17 June 1823
- Country: El Salvador

Executive branch
- Supreme Political Chief: Mariano Prado
- Governor of San Salvador: José Justo Milla
- Military Commander: José Rivas
- Headquarters: San Salvador

The Consultive Junta (Spanish: Junta Consultiva) was the government of the province of El Salvador from 25 May 1823 to 17 June 1823.

The junta was composed of:

- Mariano Prado, Supreme Political Chief
- Colonel José Justo Milla, Intendant and Governor of the Province of San Salvador
- Colonel José Rivas, Military Commander

Political offices
| Preceded by Felipe Codallos | Political Chief of San Salvador; 1823 | Succeeded by Mariano Prado |
