= Capture of San Salvador (1823) =

Battle fought during the Filisola campaign in El Salvador in 1823

- Part of Filísola's campaign in El Salvador
- Commanded by: Vicente Filísola
- Objective: Annexing El Salvador to the Mexican Empire
- Date: February of 1823
- Executed by: Mexican Imperial Army
- Outcome: Mexican victory
- Casualties: None

The Capture of San Salvador was the action that concretized the Mexican annexation of El Salvador, it occurred on February 9 when Vicente Filísola enters San Salvador waving the imperial flags and assuming the command of head of state.

== Background ==
On February 7, salvadorans were defeated and the Mexican troops captured the town of Mejicanos and continued their advance towards San Salvador. After these combats, the Salvadorans ended up being weakened.

== Capture ==
The Salvadoran forces that they were defending San Salvador fled the city that same day under the command of Antonio Jose Cañas for the Olocuilta path to Gualcince, Filísola choose not to enter San Salvador until 2 days later, Filísola captured San Salvador in February 9 of 1823 and became governor of the province. The Salvadoran soldiers who fled the city with a seriously ill Arce retreated to Honduras under the command of Antonio Jose Cañas, where they surrendered to Filísola near the city of Gualcince on February 21.

== See also ==
- Manuel José Arce
- Vicente Filisola
- Central American under Mexican rule
