= Mejicanos =

- District
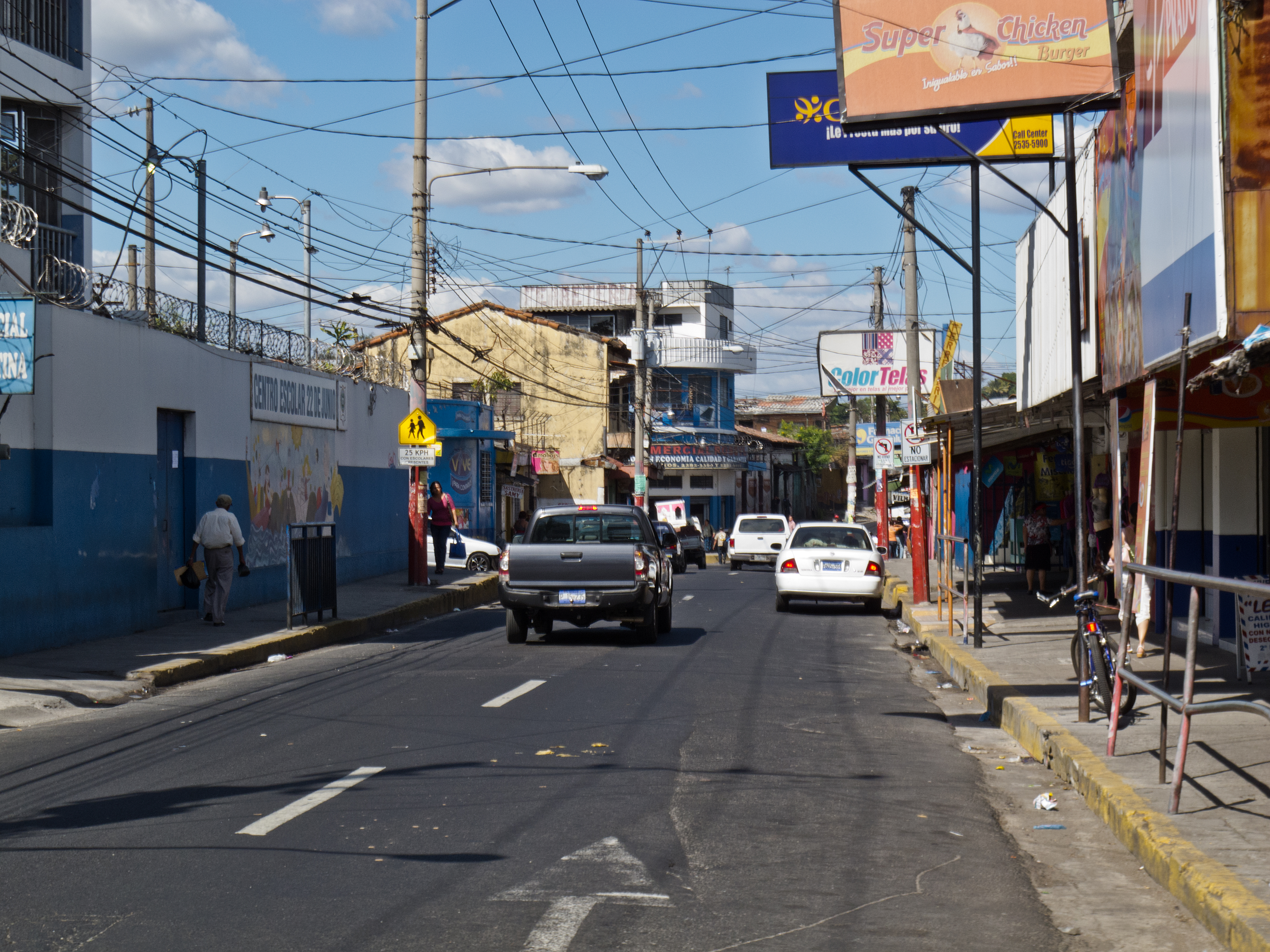

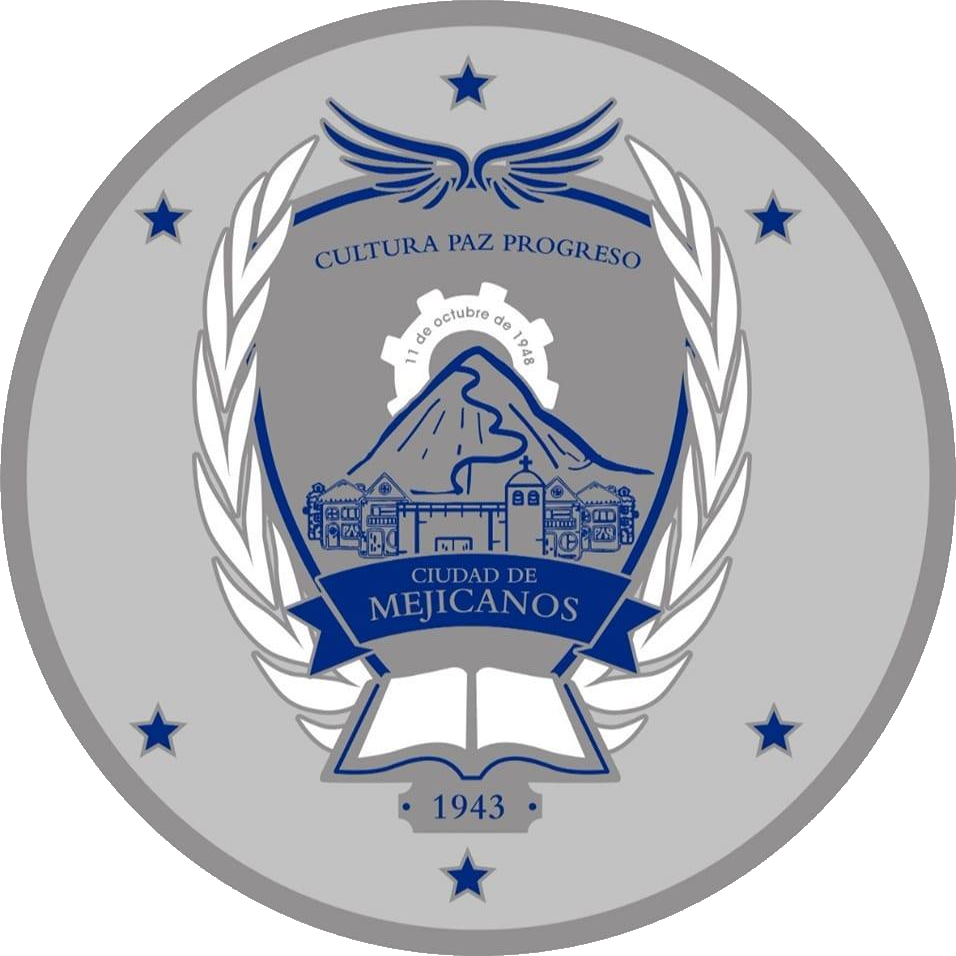
- Coat of arms
- Motto(s): Cultura, Paz, Progreso (Culture, Peace, Progress)
- Location in El Salvador
- Coordinates: 13°44′N 89°13′W
- Country: El Salvador
- Department: San Salvador Department
- Metro: San Salvador Metropolitan Area
- Founded as town: 7 October 1873
- Founded as City: 11 October 1948

Government
  - Type: Democratic Republic
  - Mayor: Saúl Meléndez

Area
  - District: 22.12 km^{2} (8.54 sq mi)
- Elevation: 712 m (2,336 ft)

Population (2020)
  - District: 141,352
  - Density: 9,579/km^{2} (24,810/sq mi)
  - Urban: 141,352
- Time zone: UTC−6 (Central Standard Time)
- SV-SS: CP 1120
- Area code: + 503
- Website: Official in Wordpress

Mejicanos is a district of San Salvador Centro municipality in the San Salvador department of El Salvador.

Mejicanos is a city located in San Salvador Department and part of the San Salvador metropolitan area. At the 2009 estimate it had 160,751 inhabitants. It has been characterized by its typical food "Yuca Frita con Merienda".

It has a municipal market, where the local citizens can buy groceries, vegetables, dairy products, meat, pupusas, etc. Many of the things available in the local market are produced in the surrounding villages, like vegetables.

It is located in a strategic point because is in the main route to other towns or municipalities, like Cuscatancingo, Mariona, San Ramon, San Salvador, etc. However it has-single lane roads, which accounts for the frequent traffic jams in the center of the city.

It has always been characterized by being a disorganized city, like other cities in El Salvador. Even though it has a municipal market people use the streets to sell their products.

Because the average altitude of the city is around 600 meters above sea level, the climate is typically warm.

As of February 2007 many bus routes go through Mejicanos.

- Route 32 goes from San Salvador's downtown (El Centro) to La Montreal (Although is Avenida Montreal is well known just for La Montreal).
- Route 23 goes from San Salvador's downtown (El Centro) to San Ramón.
- Route 6 goes from San Salvador's downtown (El Centro) to Mariona.
- Route 24 goes from San Salvador's downtown (El Centro) to Cuscatancingo.
- Route 33A goes from San Salvador's downtown (El Centro) to Delicias Norte (El Pito).
- Route 33B goes from San Salvador's downtown (El Centro) to Canton San Roque (El Pito).

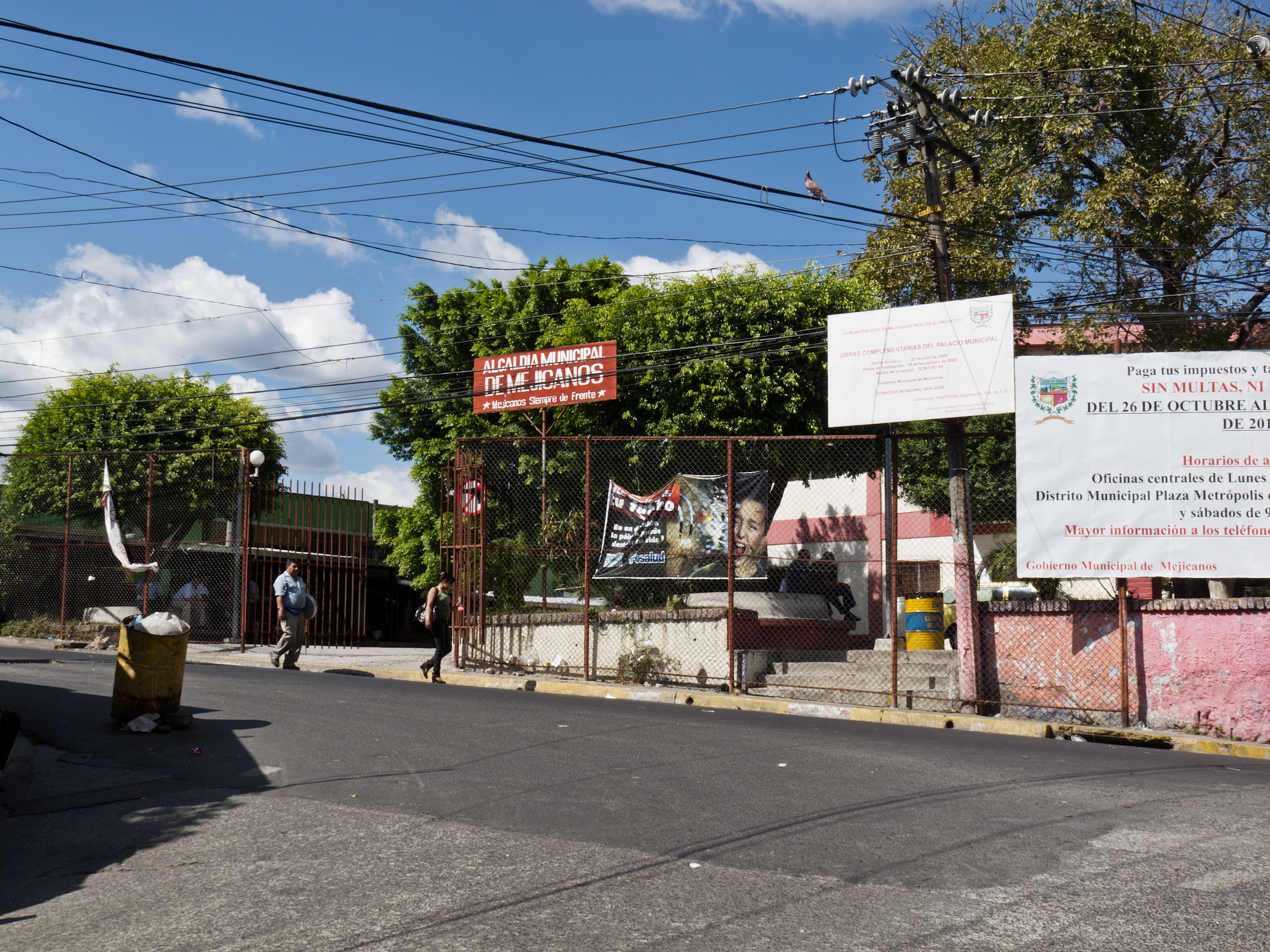
City Hall (Alcaldía) of Mejicanos

== History ==
In 1524, the Spanish conquered and colonized the territory of Cuscatlán, now El Salvador. Indigenous allies and aborigines (Tlaxcaltecas, Aztecs, and Acolhuas) from the valley of Anahuac, a Mexican territory, arrived with them. After conquering the land, they settled north of the capital, were known as "Mexicans” and founded three core groups: one group was to the north, which is now San Salvador, where the City of Mejicanos is located; the second was in Barrio de Sonsonate; and the third was Usulután, today Canton Santa Maria.

The city’s first named was "Villa of Mejicanos", and it later became the "City of Mejicanos. On 7 February 1823, General Vicente Filísola following orders of the Mexican Imperial Army, battled against Salvadoran Republic Army of Colonel Antonio José Cañas, substitute for Commander Manuel José Arce, who became ill. The Salvadorans were opposing the unconditional territory takeover by the Government of Emperor Agustín de Iturbide. Later, the City of Mejicanos stood out for its trade of goods in the streets among farmers.
