= Agustín Arrieta =

Mexican painter (1803–1874)

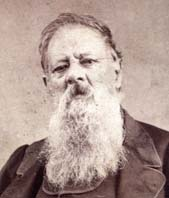
- Born: 29 August 1803; Santa Ana Chiautempan, New Spain
- Died: 22 December 1874 (aged 71); Puebla City, Mexico
- Known for: Genre Painting
- Notable work: Tertulia en pulquería, 1851

José Agustín Arrieta (29 August 1803 – 22 December 1874) was a Mexican genre painter or costumbrista painter known for his scenes of everyday life in nineteenth-century Puebla, the city in which he lived most of his life. He was very prolific, however, as a still life painter, depicting many typical Mexican foods and dishes.

== Early years and training ==
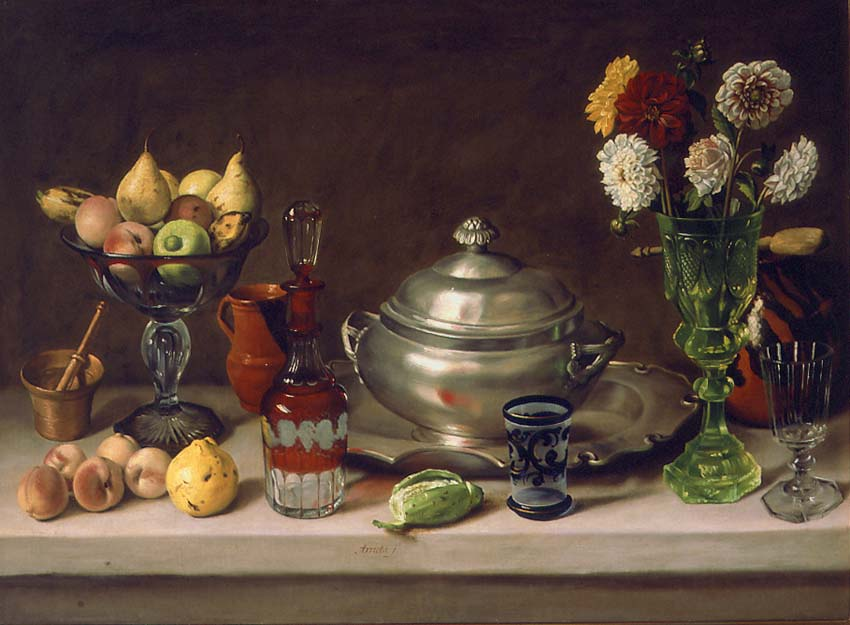
Still life entitled Dining Table, c. 1857–1859

The son of Tomás Arrieta, of Basque origin, and of Rita María Fernández, Agustín Arrieta was brought as a young boy to the city of Puebla, where he lived for the rest of his life. There is little documentary evidence of this assertion, except for his certificate of marriage to María Nicolasa Lorenzana Varela, dated 29 August 1826, and documents that demonstrate his membership in and participation in competitions of the Academy of Fine Arts in Puebla and the Academy of San Carlos. His time as a student at the Academy of Fine Arts in Puebla coincided with the presence of the professors Lorenzo Zendejas, Salvador del Huerto, López Guerrero, and the brothers Caro and José Manzo. Although he was a member of the academy, he decided to establish his own workshop, where he began to paint genre scenes and other subjects incomprehensible to the elitist clientele of the city of Puebla, from whom he received only modest sums for his works. Neither did the recognition conferred on him by the painters of Puebla in the Guía de Forasteros of 1852 improve his economic circumstances. Indeed, in order to support himself, he had to accept employment as a concierge at the State Congress.

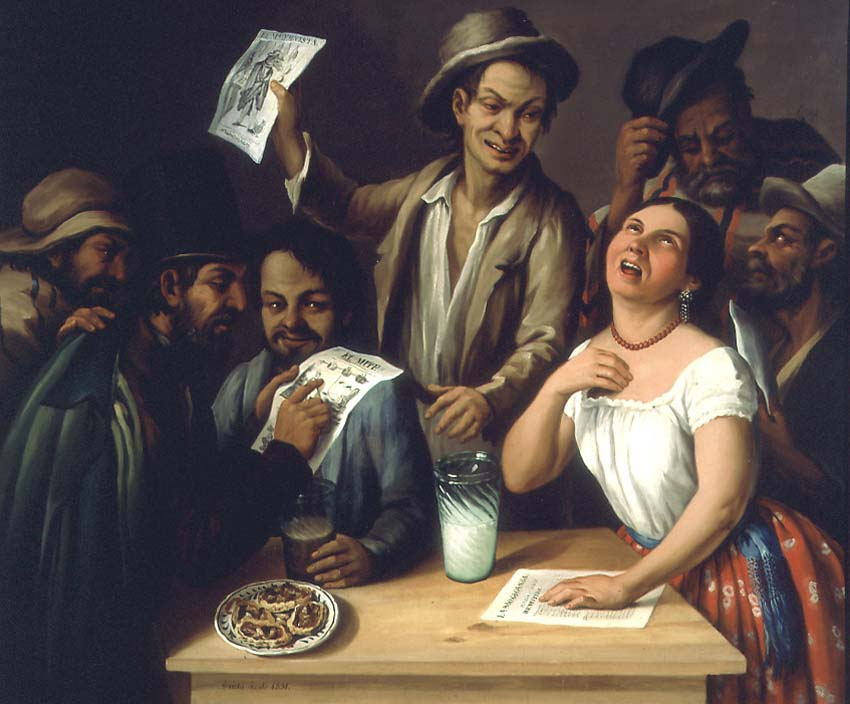
Tertulia de pulquería, 1851

Arrieta gradually mastered the techniques of drawing, composition, color, anatomy, and balance that he had learned at the academy. Combined with his natural talent, these would carry him into his mature period, when his paintings achieved a character of their own. His critics, however, point out errors in the composition of his still lifes and genre scenes, as well as the repetition of certain elements and figures. They also find the influence of Bartolomé Esteban Murillo and Diego Rodríguez de Silva y Velázquez in his work. The least interesting part of his oeuvre is his religious painting, of which there are a few examples in the churches of Puebla, such as the canvases in the Church of San Juan de Dios, commissioned in 1852: a Death of Saint Joseph, a Mary Magdalene, and a Calvary.

What distinguishes Arrieta's work is its depiction of everyday life and customs in nineteenth-century Puebla: clothing, gastronomy, and small trades, as well as human virtues and defects, are the elements that are highlighted and repeated. His works provide accurate portrayals of Mexican types such as the chinaco, the china poblana, the soldier, the water-carrier, the priest, the gentleman, the beggar, and many others. Arrieta was fascinated by mundane scenes such as the one depicted in his Tertulia de pulquería – set in one of the pulque bars of which there was no shortage in Puebla – or by street fights or market scenes, to which he lent a festive, anecdotal air. Other genre paintings by Arrieta include La sorpresa, La cocina poblana, Vendedores de horchata, and Agualojera.

== Arrieta and naturalism ==
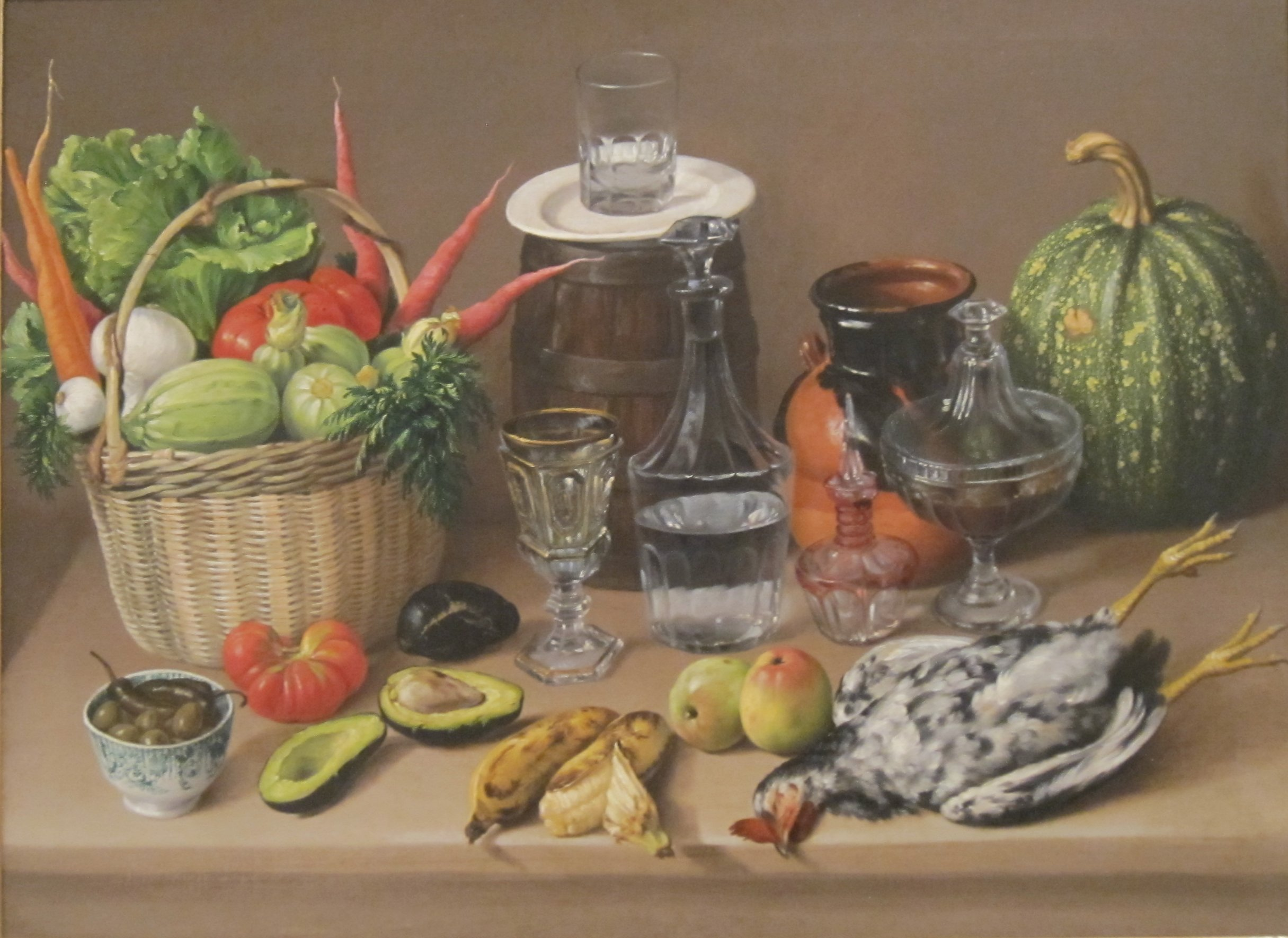
Still Life, c. 1870

It is fascinating how Arrieta sought to recover the pictorial genre of the still life charged with symbolism, which had been very common in the 16th century before developing in the 17th century into a simple representation of nature. The Academy of San Carlos did not even include still-life painting on its curriculum, but Arrieta undertook to salvage the genre, portraying exotic Mexican foods and utensils used specifically in the cuisine of Puebla. The most attractive features of his still lifes are the realism of the textures, the brilliant colors of the fruit, and the realistic rendering of glass, although his critics have objected to the lack of any logic between certain opposing elements, such as his representation of a hieratic cat next to a chicken.

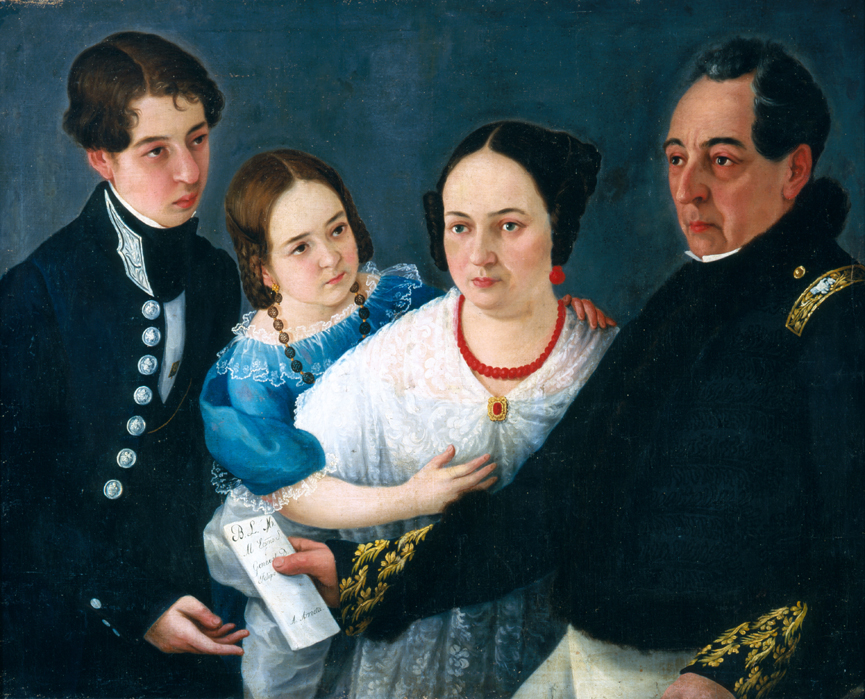
General Don Felipe Codallos' family portrait, 1838

Arrieta also painted portraits of several important figures in the society of Puebla, but his critics, including the historian Guillermo Prieto, have pointed out deficiencies in his handling of anatomy, as for example his rendering of hands, as well as the poor quality of his drapery.

With his ideas that went against the current of his time and place, Arrieta enjoyed scant popularity and lived in poverty all his life. The reputation of this important Mexican painter, a pioneer of the nationalist school, was rehabilitated by Luis Bello y Zetina in his book Pinturas Poblanas, written in 1943.

Bernardo Olivares Iriarte, a critic and historian of the art of Puebla, described Arrieta's works in 1874 as “compositions of sufficient merit, owing to the truth and complete verisimilitude he has achieved in them. Everyone agrees that, up to now, [Arrieta] has had no rival in the city in works of this kind.”

== Selected works ==
- Agualojera – Agualoja Vendor
- Antonia Ferrer de Freitas
- Cantina – Interior of an Inn
- El chinaco y la china
- La cocina poblana – The Poblano Kitchen
- El costeño – The Boy from the Coast
- El claco de risa (Un hombre en harapos rodeado de niños) – The Sound of Laughter (A man in rags surrounded by children)
- La Familia Mexicana (La Pensativa) – The Mexican Family (The Pensive Woman)
- Intervención – The Intervention
- El mandadero – The Errand Boy
- Raphael Archangel
- Retrato de la familia del General Don Felipe – Portrait of the Family of General Don Felipe
- El Requiebro – The Flirtatious Remark
- San Pascual Bailón
- La Servienta – The Servant Girl
- La sorpresa – The Surprise
- Tertulia de pulquería – Gathering in the Pulque Bar
- Untitled painting of an elderly woman holding a cat, a young girl, and an elderly man
- Untitled painting of an elderly woman holding a cat
- Vendedores de horchata – Horchata Vendors
- Viejo con niño – Old Man with Boy

== Gallery of selected works ==
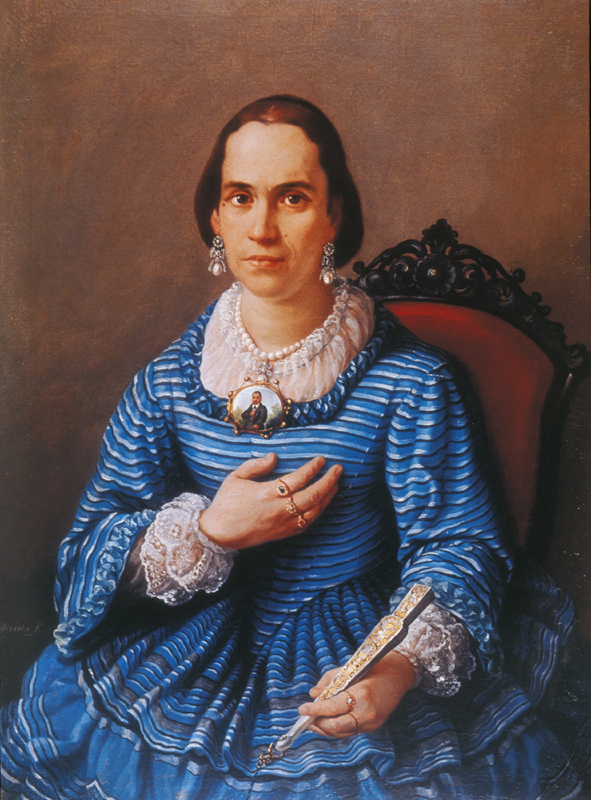

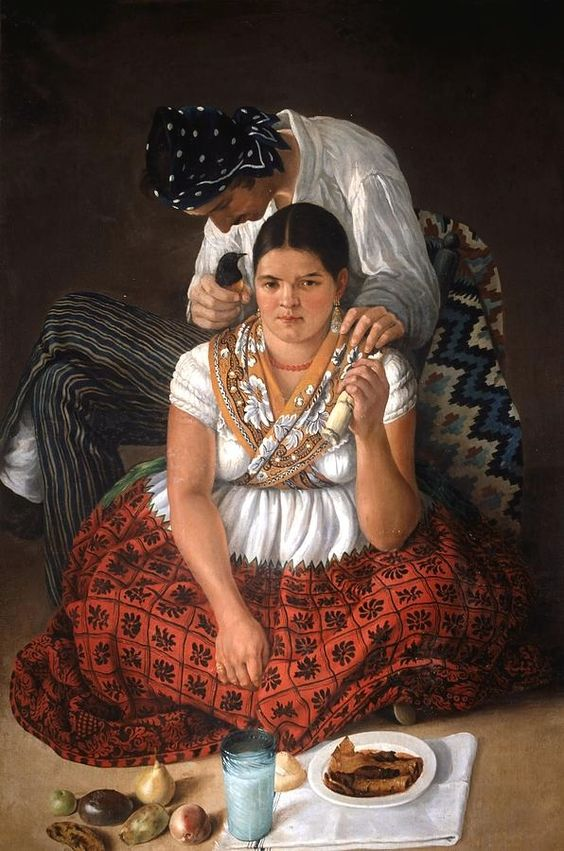

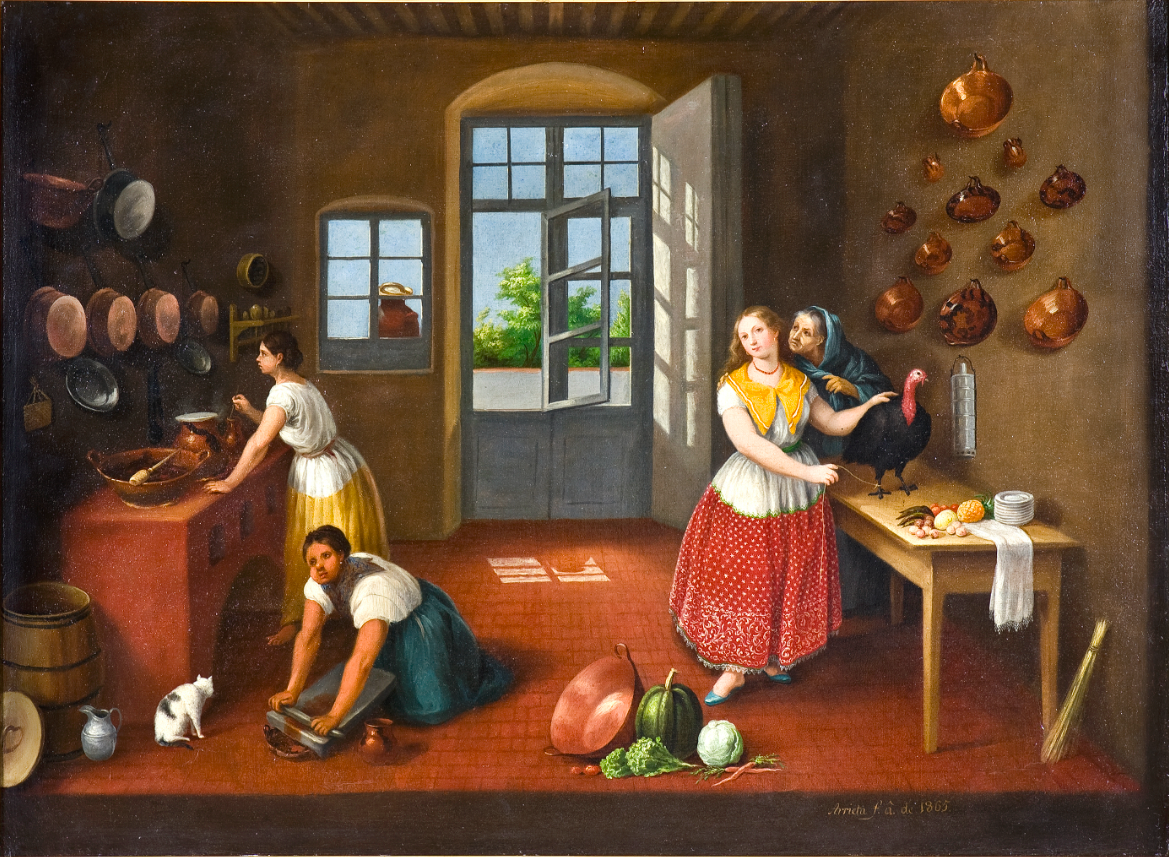

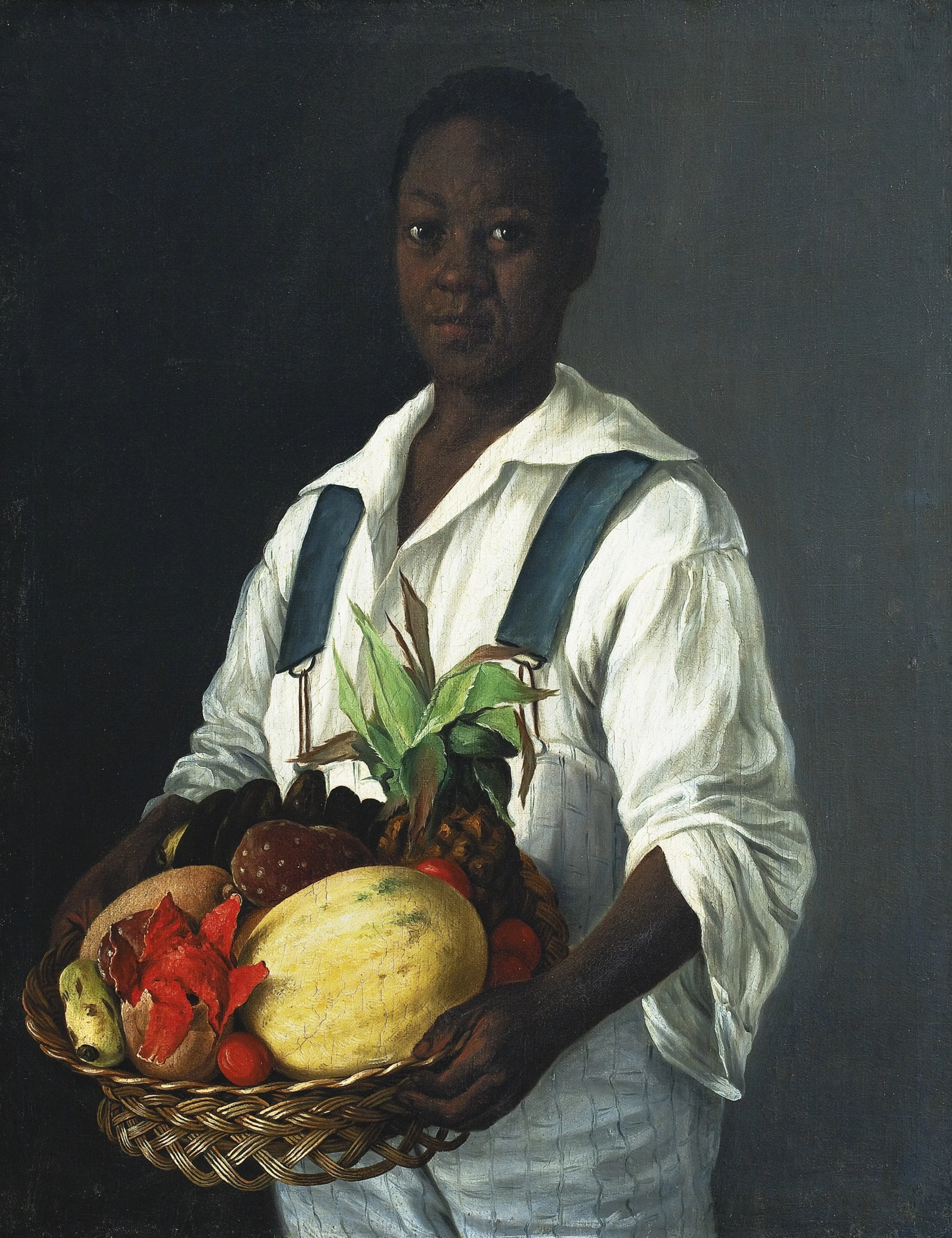

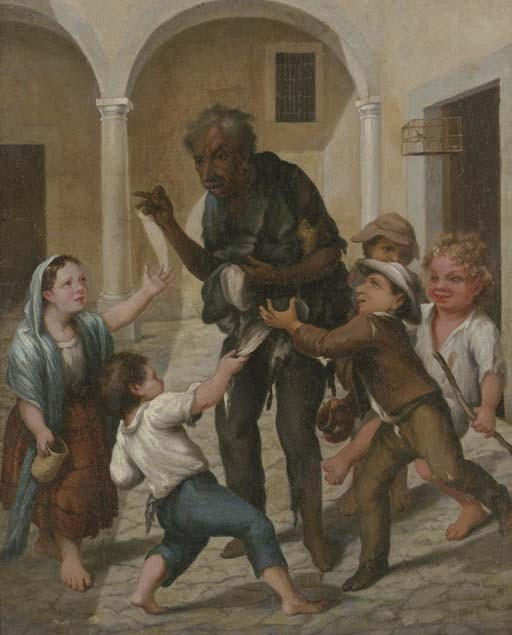

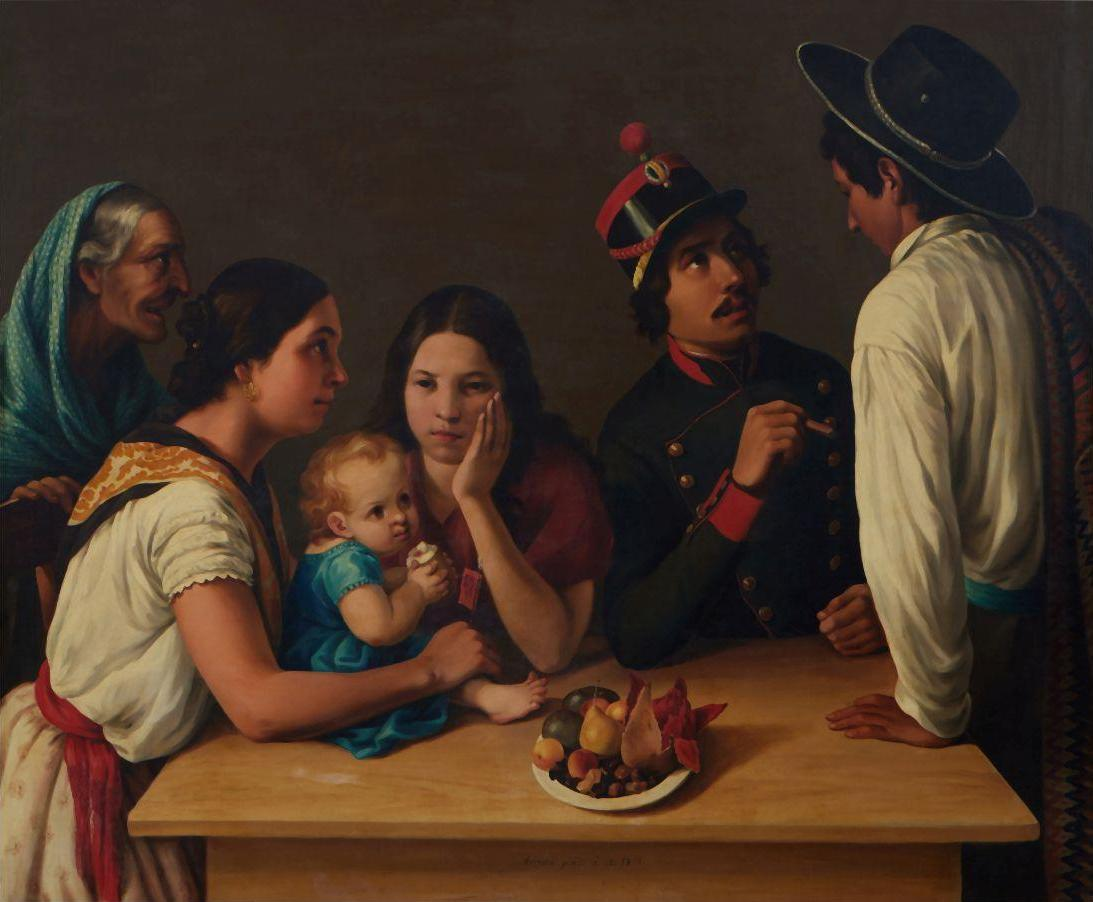

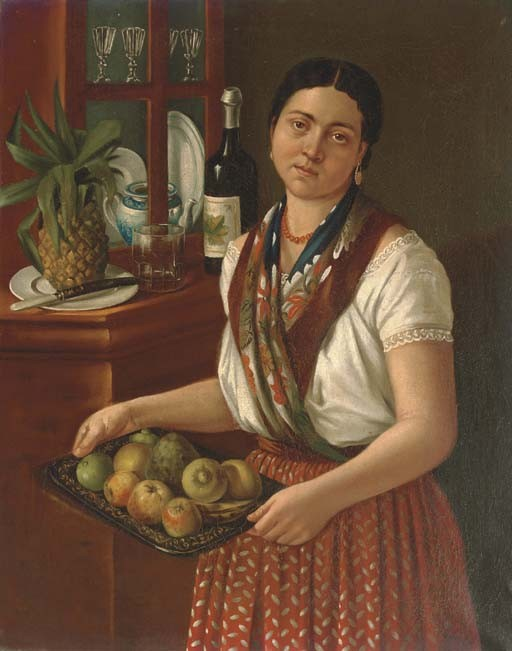

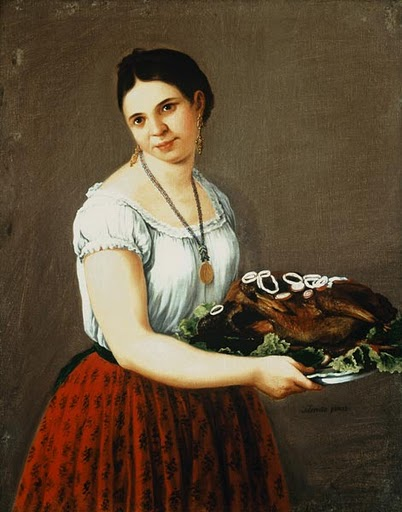

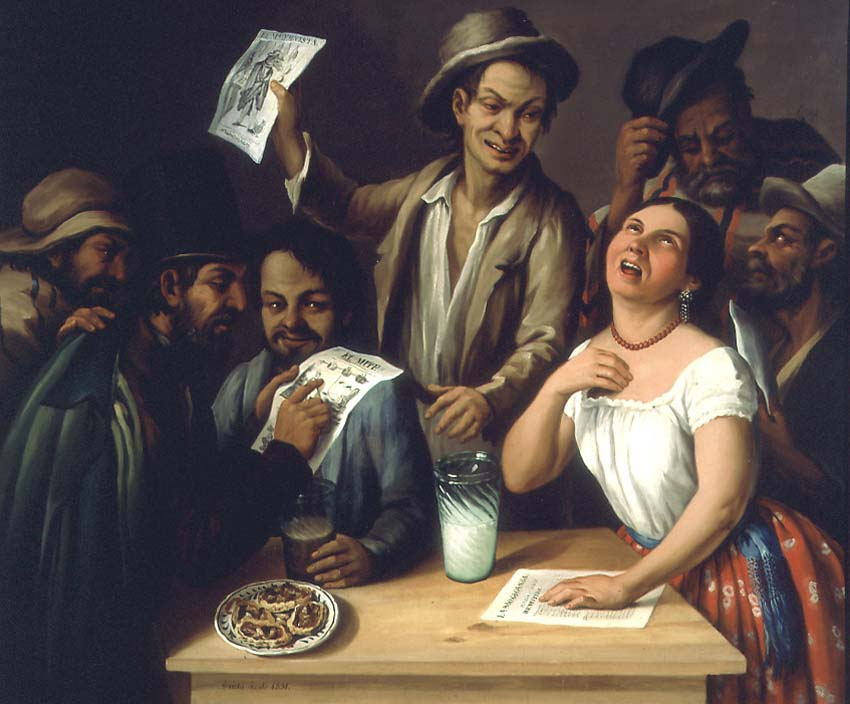

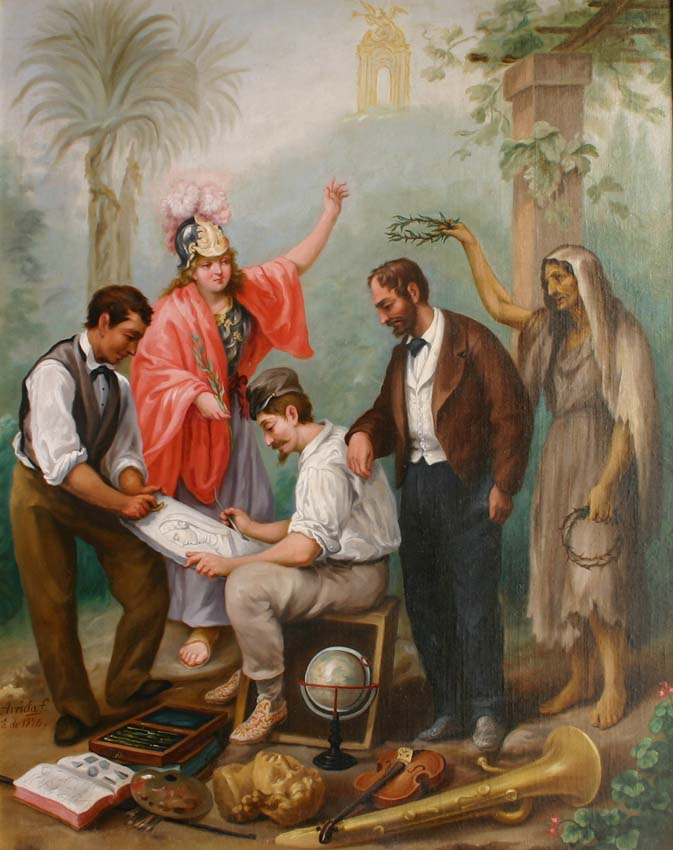

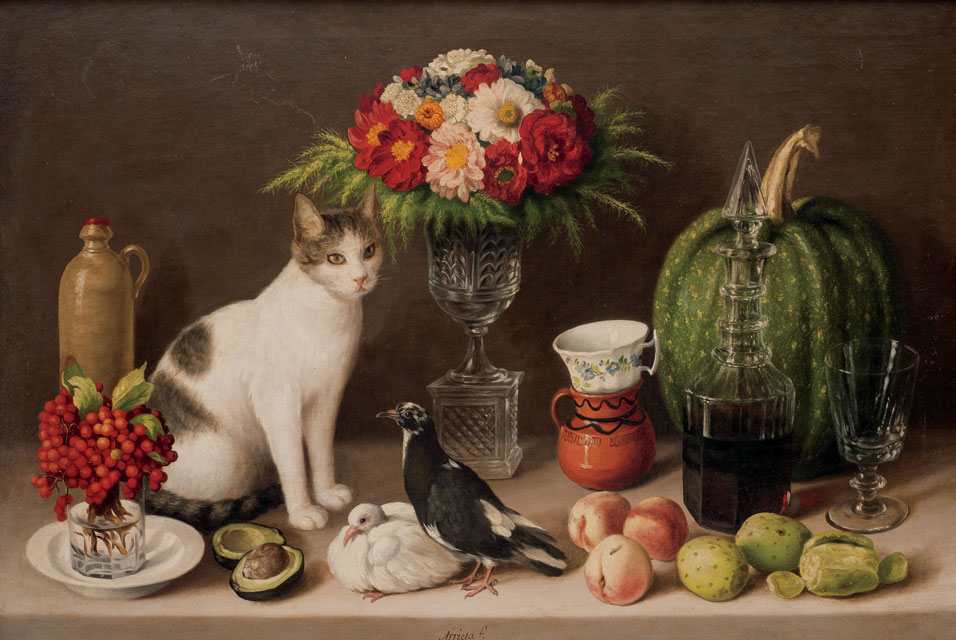

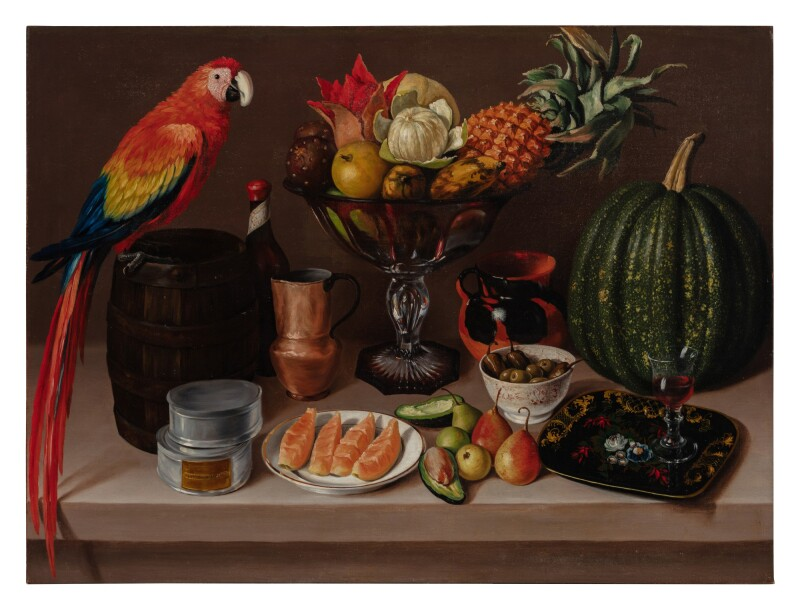

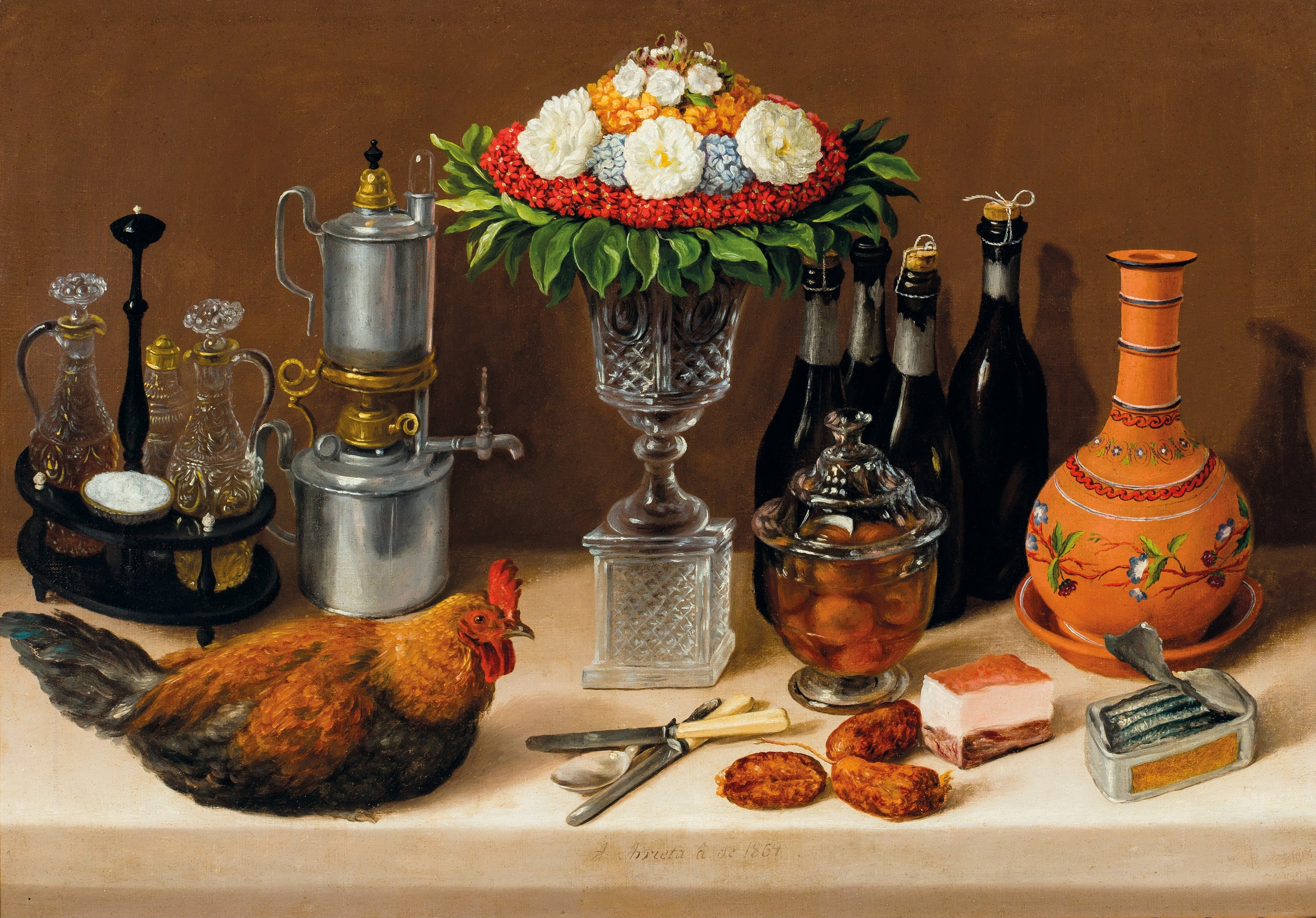
