= Vicente Filísola =

Mexican general and politician

General Vicente Filísola
- Filísola in old age. Frontispiece of Genaro García, La cooperación de México en la independencia de Centro América

2nd Captain General of Central America
- In office 7 March 1823 – 1 July 1823
- President: Supreme Executive Power
- Preceded by: Felipe Codallos
- Succeeded by: Position abolished
- In office 23 June 1822 – 22 November 1822
- Monarch: Agustín I
- Preceded by: Gabino Gaínza
- Succeeded by: Felipe Codallos

2nd Political Chief of Guatemala
- In office 23 June 1822 – 1 July 1823
- Preceded by: Gabino Gaínza
- Succeeded by: Tomás O'Horan

3rd Political Chief of El Salvador
- In office 9 February 1823 – 7 May 1823
- Preceded by: José Matías Delgado
- Succeeded by: Felipe Codallos

Personal details
- Born: Vincenzo Filizzola c. 1785 Kingdom of Naples
- Died: July 23, 1850 (aged 64–65) Mexico City, Mexico
- Occupation: Military officer
- Awards: Order of Guadalupe

Military service
- Allegiance: Spain (1804–1821); Mexico (1821–1850)
- Branch/service: Spanish Army; Mexican Army
- Years of service: 1804–1850
- Rank: Captain (Spain); Division general (Mexico)
- Battles/wars: Napoleonic Wars; Peninsular War; Mexican War of Independence; Mexican annexation of Central America; Battle of Mejicanos; Battle of Ayutuxtepeque; Capture of San Salvador; Capitulation of Gualcince; Texas Revolution; Mexican–American War

Vicente Filísola (born Vincenzo Filizzola; also spelled Filisola; c. 1785 or 1789 – 23 July 1850) was an Neapolitan-born Spanish and Mexican general and political official. After serving the Spanish Crown in the Peninsular War and in New Spain, he joined the Army of the Three Guarantees in 1821, entered Mexico City at the head of one of its divisions on 24 September 1821, and was promoted to brigadier in the First Mexican Empire.

Sent to the former Captaincy General of Guatemala as commander of the División Auxiliar and, from June 1822, as captain general and political chief, Filísola administered the annexation of Central America to the Mexican Empire, conducted the 1822–1823 campaign that occupied San Salvador, convened the congress that declared Central American independence after the Empire collapsed, and on the return march helped keep Chiapas within Mexico.

In 1836 he was second-in-command of the Mexican army in the Texas Revolution. After the capture of Antonio López de Santa Anna at San Jacinto he directed the withdrawal of the remaining Mexican forces, an act for which he was accused of cowardice and later acquitted by court-martial in 1841. Late in life he presided over Mexico’s Supreme Tribunal of War and Navy and published two major documentary defenses of his Central American and Texas commands. He died of cholera in Mexico City on 23 July 1850.

== Early life and Spanish service ==
Very little contemporary documentation survives for Filísola’s childhood. He was born Vincenzo Filizzola in the Kingdom of Naples, either at Ravello or at nearby Rivello; published dates vary, but most place it c. 1785 or in 1789 His family moved to Spain while he was a child. He enlisted in the Spanish army on 17 March 1804, served in the Peninsular War against Napoleonic France, and by 1810 held the rank of second lieutenant with decorations for combat service.

== Service in New Spain and Mexican independence ==
Filísola was sent to New Spain in 1811, after the outbreak of the Mexican War of Independence. He served as a royalist officer against the insurgency, becoming captain of artillery in 1813 and captain of grenadiers in 1814, and by the mid-1810s had entered the circle of Agustín de Iturbide. Lucas Alamán later recorded a conversation between the two men after the 1815 failure against the fort of Cóporo, in which Iturbide spoke of the ease with which independence might be achieved if royalist and insurgent officers came to terms.

By 1820–21 Filísola commanded the jurisdiction of Maravatío in the intendancy of Valladolid. In late March 1821 Iturbide invited him to join the Plan of Iguala at the head of what became the 13th Division of the Army of the Three Guarantees, a force of about 1,500 men. The division and neighboring units swore the plan at Zitácuaro.

During the Trigarante campaign he fought at the action of La Huerta near Toluca. After the Treaties of Córdoba, he was ordered to take possession of Mexico City ahead of the main army. On the afternoon of 24 September 1821 Filísola entered the capital with a force that Alamán put at 4,000 men of all arms, received the plaza from the last royalist authorities, and held the city until the main unit's triumphal entry on 27 September. Iturbide promoted him to brigadier general and named him a Knight of the National Order of Guadalupe in December 1821.

== Captaincy General of Guatemala, 1822–1823 ==
=== Mission and arrival ===
The Act of Independence of Central America left the old Kingdom of Guatemala divided between factions that favored a separate republic and those that favored union with Iturbide’s empire under the Plan of Iguala. Chiapas and the Conservative elite of Guatemala City leaned toward Mexico; San Salvador, under José Matías Delgado and Manuel José Arce, rejected annexation as illegitimate.

On 27 December 1821 Iturbide gave Filísola command of the expedition originally intended for another officer, with orders to protect those provinces that had sworn or were about to swear independence under the Plan of Iguala and to incorporate them to the Empire. The force, known as the División Auxiliar or División Protectora del Reino de Guatemala, marched by way of Chiapas. Filísola entered Guatemala City on 12 June 1822, at the invitation of the city’s ayuntamiento rather than as an unheralded occupier, and on 23 June succeeded Gabino Gaínza as captain general and political chief of the provinces of Guatemala.

=== Administration of the annexation ===
Most of the Central American provinces voted for union with Mexico in late 1821 and early 1822. On 4 November 1822 the imperial Ministry of War ordered the old captaincy general divided, provisionally and until the cortes made a permanent division, into three commandancies-general, independent of one another and answering directly to the ministries in Mexico City: Chiapas, capital Ciudad Real, under Miguel González Saravia; Sacatepéquez, capital Nueva Guatemala, under Filísola himself; and Costa Rica, capital León, under brigadier Manuel Rincón. Filísola published the order on 9 January 1823. It never took effect.

His administration depended on the Conservative merchant elite of Guatemala City, which supplied money, provisions, and auxiliary troops, and on a Mexican contingent that was never large enough to garrison the whole region by force.

=== Campaign against San Salvador ===
San Salvador remained the principal holdout. Filísola first tried to negotiate. Iturbide, impatient with the delay, ordered him to reduce the province by arms. In November 1822 Filísola left Guatemala City with about 2,000 men and opened a winter campaign in the west of the Salvadoran province. After occupying Santa Ana, Texistepeque, and neighboring towns, Mexican and allied Guatemalan forces fought Salvadoran troops around El Guayabal and Guazapa on 14 January 1823. Filísola offered Arce terms; Arce refused.

On 7 February 1823 Mexican troops took the town of Mejicanos and fought at Ayutuxtepeque. The Salvadoran remnants abandoned the capital. Filísola entered San Salvador on 9 February 1823 and the following day declared the province annexed to the Empire; he served as political chief of El Salvador from that date until 7 May. Remaining Salvadoran forces under Mariano Prado surrendered near Gualcince, Honduras, on 21 February. The occupation was short. News of the Casa Mata Plan and of Iturbide’s collapsing authority reached Filísola in late February. He left San Salvador on 6 March, leaving Felipe Codallos as governor, and returned to Guatemala City.

=== Congress of 1823 and the separation from Mexico ===
With the imperial premise gone, Filísola declined to hold Central America by force against a Mexican republic that no longer claimed it on the original terms. On 29 March 1823 he issued the decree convening a congress of the Central American provinces, using the mechanism contemplated in the 1821 Act of Independence. The assembly opened on 29 June 1823. Filísola addressed the delegates, stated that the decision was theirs, and on 1 July 1823 the congress declared the independence of the provinces from Mexico and created the United Provinces of Central America.

He asked to be relieved on 4 July because a Mexican officer could not serve another sovereign state; the new authorities asked him to remain until a replacement was arranged. The assembly ordered the Mexican division out on 16 July. Residents of Guatemala City raised the cost of the march, put at 36,000 pesos. Filísola left on 3 August by the road north and marched north through Chiapas, which remained with Mexico rather than joining the new federation. Central American accounts later accused him of occupation and extortion and treated the payment as the city sending an occupying army home. He answered them in a printed manifesto.

== Republican commands and the Texas empresario grant ==
Despite his identification with Iturbide, Filísola continued to hold senior rank under the Mexican Republic. He served on the Supreme Tribunal of War as early as 1832 and in January 1833 was named commandant general of the Eastern Interior Provinces (Coahuila y Tejas, Nuevo León, and Tamaulipas), with instructions that included the pacification of Texas. Illness forced him to give up the command for a time; he later resumed duty.

On 12 October 1831 he received an empresario contract to settle 600 families who were not Anglo-Americans in East Texas, on a tract that overlapped land earlier associated with the Cherokee in Texas. He did not fulfill the contract.

== Texas campaign of 1836 ==
When Antonio López de Santa Anna organized the 1836 expedition against the Texas revolt, he named Filísola, by then a general de división, second-in-command of the Ejército de Operaciones sobre Texas. Filísola did not command a pitched battle. Santa Anna drove ahead with a light striking force; Filísola was left with the heavy equipment, supply wagons, and livestock. Spring rains and flooded crossings on the Guadalupe, Colorado, and Brazos delayed the main body, which ran short of food and forage while Santa Anna detached himself toward Harrisburg.

Santa Anna was captured at the Battle of San Jacinto on 21 April 1836. Filísola, then between San Felipe and Fort Bend with about 1,000 men after sending Martín Perfecto de Cos forward, learned of the disaster the next day from wounded survivors, among them Captain Miguel Aguirre of the Tampico Regiment. The remaining Mexican forces in Texas, Filísola’s division and the division of José de Urrea, together several thousand men, concentrated near Fort Bend. A council of war under Filísola considered whether to advance on Sam Houston’s army or retire. Santa Anna, a prisoner, sent orders to withdraw east of the Colorado and then from Texas in exchange for his life and that of the other captives. Urrea and some officers argued for continuing the campaign. Filísola chose retreat, citing the condition of the army, the rains, the threat to the prisoners, and the captured commander’s order.

He directed the withdrawal of the remaining Mexican troops, a movement commonly estimated at about 4,000 men. On 24 May he ordered Juan José Andrade to dismantle the works at the Alamo and evacuate San Antonio de Béxar. He accepted the public articles of the Treaties of Velasco insofar as they required the army to retire. By the time the government of José Justo Corro, which held that a prisoner-president could not bind the republic, ordered him on 28 May not to give up territory already held, San Antonio had been evacuated and the army had crossed the Nueces. Filísola offered to turn back; the state of the troops made a counter-march impractical. The retreat continued to Matamoros. On 12 June Urrea replaced him in general command; Filísola turned his own troops over to Andrade and retired to Saltillo.

== Court-martial, writings, and later career ==
In Mexico Filísola was denounced as a coward and a traitor for abandoning Texas without another battle, even when his own troops had not been defeated in the field. Santa Anna, once free, shifted responsibility for the loss onto him. Filísola answered at once with a Representación dirigida al Supremo Gobierno, which the Republic of Texas printed in English in 1837 as Evacuation of Texas. He faced a formal court-martial and was acquitted in June 1841.

He was then employed again on the northern frontier and, during the Mexican–American War, is described in standard biographical notices as commanding one of the three divisions of the Mexican army, with service connected to the concentrations at Toluca and San Luis Potosí. After the peace of 1848 he became president of the Supreme Tribunal of War and Navy, the office he held when he published his two-volume Memorias para la historia de la guerra de Tejas (1848–1849).

== Death ==
Filísola died of cholera in Mexico City on 23 July 1850. He was buried at the cemetery of Nuestra Señora de los Ángeles. Funeral notices describe a large civic and official procession from his house on the street of Santa Clara.

== Writings ==
Filísola left two documentary corpora, each written to justify a controversial command.

- On Central America, his contemporary manifestos and official correspondence were gathered from family papers by Genaro García and published as La cooperación de México en la independencia de Centro América (1911), after many of the originals that had remained in Central America were lost.
- On Texas, the 1836 Representación and the later Memorias (begun, according to García, around 1840 and issued in 1848–49) are among the most important Mexican narrative sources for 1835–37. Carlos E. Castañeda translated a selection in The Mexican Side of the Texas Revolution (1928). Wallace Woolsey’s English version of the full memoirs appeared only in 1985.

== See also ==
- First Mexican Empire
- Central America under Mexican rule
- Gabino Gaínza
- Felipe Codallos
- Pedro María de Anaya
- Manuel José Arce
- Texas Revolution
- Treaties of Velasco
- José de Urrea

Political offices
Preceded by José Matías Delgado	Governor of El Salvador; 1823	Succeeded by Felipe Codallos
Preceded by Gabino Gaínza	Chief of State of Central America; 1823	Succeeded by First Triumvirate
