= Timeline of San Salvador =

The following is a timeline of the history of the city of San Salvador, El Salvador.

== Prior to 20th century ==
- 1525 – San Salvador founded by Spaniard Gonzalo de Alvarado.
- 1526 – "Settlement destroyed by natives."
- 1528 – San Salvador refounded by Spaniard Diego de Alvarado.
- 1823 - San Salvador is occupied by Mexican imperial forces
- 1831 – San Salvador becomes capital of the Central American Union.
- 1840 – San Salvador becomes capital of El Salvador.
- 1841 – University of El Salvador founded.
- 1842 – Catholic Diocese of San Salvador established.
- 1849 – Cemetery of Distinguished Citizens established.
- 1854 – April 16: Earthquake.
- 1870 – National Palace built.
- 1890 – Siglo XX newspaper begins publication.

== 20th century ==
=== 1900s–1960s ===
- 1911
  - Liberty Monument erected in Duenas Park.
  - National Palace rebuilt.
- 1917
  - Earthquake.
  - National Theatre of El Salvador opens.
- 1920 – Population: 80,100.
- 1921
  - Siman (shop) in business.
  - Casa Presidencial (government residence) built.
- 1923 – Ilopango military airfield begins operating.
- 1932 – Estadio Jorge "Mágico" González (stadium) built.
- 1934 – Flood.
- 1935 – Parque Cuscatlán (park) established.
- 1936 – El Diario de Hoy newspaper headquartered in San Salvador.
- 1949 – Tribuna Libre newspaper begins publication.
- 1950
  - Club Deportivo Atlético Marte formed.
  - Population: 161,951.
- 1951
  - Cathedral burns down.
  - Organization of Central American States headquartered in city.
- 1953 – Iglesia de María Auxiliadora (El Salvador) (church) built.
- 1955 – Cine Avenida (cinema) opens (approximate date).
- 1956 – Metropolitan Cathedral of San Salvador construction begins.
- 1958 – El Salvador Amateur Radio Club headquartered in city.
- 1960 – Alianza Fútbol Club active.
- 1964
  - José Napoleón Duarte becomes mayor.
  - Biblioteca Nacional Francisco Gavidia (library) building constructed.
- 1965 – Jesuit Central American University founded.
- 1969 – "Metroplan 80" (city plan) created.

=== 1970s–1990s ===
- 1970
  - Metrocentro shopping mall in business.
  - Carlos Antonio Herrera Rebollo becomes mayor.
- 1971
  - Teatro Presidente opens.
  - Population: 337,171.
- 1972 – Wester Hotel in business.
- 1974 – José Antonio Morales Ehrlich becomes mayor.
- 1975 – International Trade and Convention Center opens.
- 1976
  - Estadio Cuscatlán (stadium) opens.
  - José Napoleón Gómez becomes mayor.
- 1977 – February 28: Political demonstration; crackdown.
- 1978 – Hugo Guerra becomes mayor.
- 1979 – Julio Adolfo Rey Prendes becomes mayor.
- 1980
  - March 24: Archbishop Óscar Romero assassinated.
  - El Salvador International Airport opens.
- 1981 – October 24: Bombing.
- 1982 – Alejandro Duarte becomes mayor.
- 1985 – José Antonio Morales Ehrlich becomes mayor again.
- 1986 – October 10: 1986 San Salvador earthquake.
- 1988
  - December: Car bombing.
  - Armando Calderón Sol becomes mayor.
- 1989
  - November 11: FMLN attacks.
  - November 16: Murder of six Jesuits
  - Diario Co Latino newspaper in publication.
- 1992 – Population: 415,346.
- 1994 – Mario Valiente becomes mayor.
- 1995 – Centro Comercial Galerias shopping mall in business.
- 1996 – Homies Unidos (community group) founded.
- 1997
  - Hilton Hotel in business.
  - Héctor Silva becomes mayor.
- 1999 – Museo de la Palabra y la Imagen opens.

== 21st century ==
- 2002
  - RN-5 highway opens.
  - San Salvador Fútbol Club formed.
- 2003
  - Teatro Luis Poma and Museo de Arte de El Salvador building open.
  - Carlos Rivas Zamora becomes mayor.
- 2005 – Sister city relationship established with Los Angeles, USA.
- 2006 – Violeta Menjívar becomes mayor.
- 2007 – Population: 316,090.
- 2009
  - World Trade Center San Salvador built.
  - Norman Quijano becomes mayor.
  - RN-21 highway opens.
- 2010
  - June: Bus attacks.
  - Torre El Pedregal built.
- 2011 – Parque del Bicentenario (park) established.
- 2014 – Air pollution in San Salvador reaches annual mean of 42 PM2.5 and 77 PM10, more than recommended.

== See also ==
- San Salvador history
- List of mayors of San Salvador 1964–present
- History of El Salvador

== Bibliography ==
- A.A. MacErlean (1912). "San Salvador". Catholic Encyclopedia. New York.
- "San Salvador". Collier's Encyclopedia. New York: P.F. Collier & Son. 1928. hdl:2027/mdp.39015073301890.
- Mario Lungo (2000). "Downtown San Salvador: housing, public spaces, and economic transformation". In Mario Polèse and Richard E. Stren (ed.). The Social Sustainability of Cities: Diversity and the Management of Change. University of Toronto Press. ISBN 978-0-8020-8320-3.
