= Battle of Mejicanos (1823) =

Battle fought during the Filisola campaign in El Salvador in 1823

- Part of the Mexican annexation of El Salvador and Filísola's campaign in El Salvador
Date	7 February 1823
Location	Mejicanos, El Salvador 13°44′N 89°13′W
Result	Mexican Victory: Filísola continues its advance towards San Salvador

Belligerents
(Mexico) Mexican Empire	El Salvador

Commanders and leaders
(Mexico) Vicente Filísola (Mexico) José Luis Ojeda (Mexico) Pedro María Anaya	Unknown

Strength
2000	Unknown

Casualties and losses
13 dead 40 injured	100 dead
- Location within El Salvador

The Battle of Mejicanos or also known Combat of Mejicanos was a confrontation between Salvadoran troops and Mexican troops led by General Vicente Filísola during the Mexican annexation of El Salvador.

== The battle ==
The battle occurred on February 7, 1823, where the confrontation between Salvadorans and Mexicans would take place, resulting in a Mexican victory with 13 Mexican casualties and some wounded while the Salvadorans suffered 100 casualties.

== Aftermath ==
After the Mexican victory, the Mejicanos would occupy the city, the Mexicans advanced to San Salvador where a confrontation would occur that would end with a Mexican victory where El Salvador was annexed to the Mexican Empire, swearing loyalty to it until its dissolution.

== See also ==
- History of El salvador
- Timeline of San Salvador
- Central America under Mexican rule
- Vicente Filisola
- Manuel José Arce
