= José Rivas (Salvadoran military figure) =

Central American military officer

Military Commander of the Consultive Junta
- In office 25 May 1823 – 17 June 1823
- Preceded by: Position established
- Succeeded by: Position abolished

Personal details
- Born: 18th century
- Died: 19th century
- Occupation: Military officer

Military service
- Allegiance: El Salvador
- Rank: Colonel
- Battles/wars: Mexican annexation of El Salvador

Colonel José Rivas (fl. 1823) was a Central American military officer. He served as the military commander of the Consultive Junta from 25 May to 17 June 1823.
