= Province of San Salvador =

Province of San Salvador Provincia de San Salvador
- 1821–1824
- Flag
- Status: Province
- Capital: San Salvador
- Common languages: Spanish
- Government: Federal Republic
- Political Chief
  - 1821-1821: Pedro Barriere (first)
  - 1823-1824: Mariano Prado (last)
- History
  - Established: 15 September, 1821
  - Independence of El Salvador: September 15, 1821
  - Battle of Llano El Espino (1822): March 1, 1822
  - Mexican annexation of El Salvador: February 9, 1823
  - Disestablished: 22 April, 1824
| Preceded by | Succeeded by |
| Intendancy of San Salvador | Central America under Mexican rule |
- Today part of: El Salvador

The Province of San Salvador (Spanish: Provincia de San Salvador) was a short-lived government established in what is today present El Salvador. This came following the Central American Act of Independence and dissolution of the Intendancy of San Salvador.

Pedro Barriere was appointed as the First Political Chief of San Salvador on September 21 after swearing allegiance to the new republic.

== History ==
Barriere was succeeded on 28 November, 1821 by José Matías Delgado, a prominent figure in the 1811 independence movement. El Salvador ceded from the Mexican Empire and soon after, the city's of Sonsonate and Santa Ana were occupied by the Guatemalan Army. Colonel Manuel José Arce was one of the commanders who repelled the Guatemalans in 1822.

Delgado was overthrown in February 1823, following the Mexican annexation of El Salvador. In June 1823, the government was reestablished with Mariano Prado appointed Provisional Political Chief until the government was abolished in 1824.

The Province of San Salvador was succeeded by the State of El Salvador (1824–1841) as part of the Federal Republic of Central America.

== See also ==
- Act of Independence of Central America
- History of El Salvador
- History of Central America
