= Antonio José Cañas =

Salvadoran politician (1785–1844)

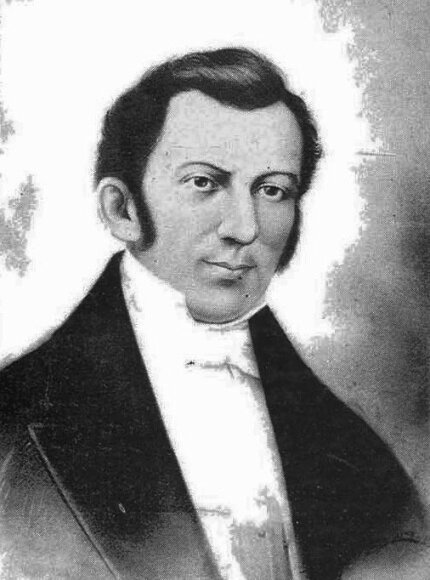

Head of State of El Salvador
- In office 15 April 1840 – 20 September 1840; Provisional Head of State
- Preceded by: Municipal Council of San Salvador
- Succeeded by: Norberto Ramírez
- In office 23 May 1838 – 11 July 1839; Provisional Head of State
- Preceded by: Timoteo Menéndez
- Succeeded by: Francisco Morazán

Personal details
- Born: Antonio José Cañas Quintanilla; 26 October 1785 San Vicente, Captaincy General of Guatemala
- Died: 24 February 1844 (aged 58) El Salvador
- Party: Independent
- Occupation: Politician, diplomat, military officer

Military service
- Battles/wars: Mexican annexation of El Salvador; Mexican annexation of El Salvador; Battle of Ayutuxtepeque; Battle of San Salvador

Antonio José Cañas Quintanilla (26 October 1785 – 24 February 1844) was a Salvadoran military officer, diplomat, and politician. For two brief periods he was head of state of the State of El Salvador, within the Federal Republic of Central America (1839 and 1840).

The Central American provinces declared independence from Spain on September 15, 1821. Cañas was one of the commissioners named by the legislature of El Salvador to oppose annexation to the Mexican Empire in 1822. Central America as a whole nevertheless supported annexation, and the region became part of the Mexican Empire in 1822. In 1823 Agustín de Iturbide was overthrown, less than a year after he was proclaimed Emperor, and the Empire came to an end. Central America withdrew from Mexico and formed a federal republic.

In May 1824, President James Monroe granted United States recognition to this new Republic of Central America. The United States became the first nation to do so, and shortly thereafter Monroe received the Central American ambassador, Antonio José Cañas. Cañas's objectives were to gain protection from Mexico, and perhaps also from Spain, and to negotiate a commercial treaty. He was also interested in securing aid for a proposed interoceanic canal across Central America. The United States refused to sign a security treaty and was not interested in the canal, but it was interested in a commercial treaty. The treaty was signed December 5, 1825.

Nearly 150 years later, U.S. President John F. Kennedy addressed a summit meeting of Central American presidents in San José, Costa Rica with the following words:

In 1825 a son of El Salvador, and a citizen of Central America — Antonio José Cañas — the first minister accredited by the United Provinces of Central America to the United States, delivered an invitation to Secretary of State Henry Clay. He asked him to send representatives to the first Inter-American Congress at Panama, a meeting at which, he said, the struggling new nations of the hemisphere "might consider upon and adopt the best plan for defending the states of the New World from foreign aggression, and... raise them to that elevation of wealth and power, which, from their resources, they may attain."

Today, 138 years later, we are gathered in this theater in pursuit of those same goals: the preservation of our independence, the extension of freedom, and the elevation of the welfare of our citizens to a level as high as "from our resources" we can attain. And today I have come from the United States at the invitation of a Central America which, with Panama, is rapidly attaining a unity of purpose, effort and achievement which has been unknown since the dissolution of that earliest federation.

In May 1838, Salvadoran head of state Timoteo Menéndez named Cañas a minister without portfolio. He began working diligently to organize the public administration into four departments: hacienda (finance), guerra (war), relaciones (foreign affairs) and gobernación (interior). In Salvadoran history, Cañas is considered the first minister of each of these four cabinet departments.

On May 23, 1839, Menéndez provisionally turned over power to Colonel Cañas. He served until July 11, 1839. He was succeeded by General Francisco Morazán, who served until February 1840.

On April 15, 1840, the Municipal Council of San Salvador named Cañas head of state of El Salvador for a second time. He served until September 20, 1840, when a revolt by General Francisco Malespín forced his resignation. (Malespín had intended to rule through Cañas, but Cañas was not agreeable.) After José Damián Villacorta rejected the appointment, Senator Norberto Ramírez took over the government.

Political offices
Preceded by Timoteo Menéndez	Head of State of El Salvador (provisional); 1839	Succeeded by Francisco Morazán
Preceded by Municipal Council of San Salvador (acting)	Head of State of El Salvador (provisional); 1840	Succeeded by Norberto Ramírez
