= Gabino Gaínza =

Spanish military officer (d. 1829)

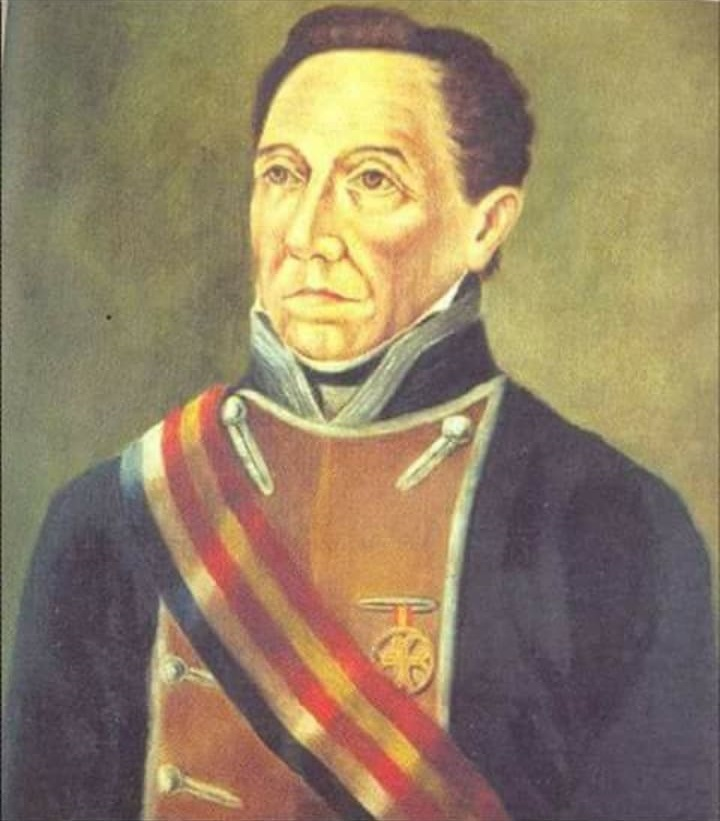

1st Captain General of Central America
- In office 5 January 1822 – 23 June 1822
- Monarch: Agustín I
- Preceded by: Position established
- Succeeded by: Vicente Filísola

1st Chief Political Officer of the Province of Guatemala
- In office 15 September 1821 – 23 October 1822
- Preceded by: Position established
- Succeeded by: Vicente Filísola

1st Chief Political Officer of the Province of Guatemala
- In office 5 March 1821 – 15 September 1821
- Preceded by: Position established
- Succeeded by: Carlos de Urrutia and Montoya

Captain General of Chile
- In office 19 July 1814 – 26 December 1814
- Preceded by: Juan Francisco Sánchez
- Succeeded by: Mariano Osorio

Personal details
- Born: Gabino Gaínza y Fernández de Medrano; 20 October 1753 (or 1760) Vizcaya or Guipúzcoa, Basque Country
- Died: 1829 Mexico
- Occupation: military and political

Military service
- Allegiance: Army of Spain
- Rank: general

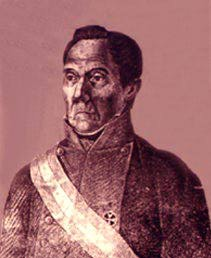
Gabino Gaínza, captain general of Guatemala

Gabino or Gavino Gaínza y Fernández de Medrano (October 20, 1753 or 1760, depending on the source, Guipúzcoa, País Vasco, Spain – c. 1829, Mexico City) was a Spanish military officer and politician in Spain's American colonies. During the Latin American wars of independence, he initially fought on the royalist side, in Chile. Later, in Guatemala, he supported independence and became the first president of a united Central America extending from Soconusco (in Chiapas) through Guatemala, El Salvador, Honduras, Nicaragua and Costa Rica.

== Military career ==
He arrived in Peru in 1783 as a Spanish military officer. There he participated in the repression of the indigenous rebellion headed by Túpac Amaru. Afterwards, he was transferred to Guayaquil as a colonel in charge of the fleet of gunboats in the port. In Guayaquil in 1799, he married Gregoria Rocafuerte, the sister of the future Ecuadoran patriot and president Vicente Rocafuerte. He was 46 and she was 20.

His military career continued without any setbacks. He was appointed in 1792 knight of the Order of St. John. He was a confidant of several Peruvian viceroys. He was promoted to brigadier and given command of the Battalion Infante Don Calres in Lima in 1811.

== Royalist chief in the war in Chile ==
In January 1814, he was sent to Chile by Viceroy José Fernando de Abascal y Sousa as captain general of the kingdom and commanding general of the royalist forces. He replaced Juan Francisco Sánchez, a captain who led the royalist forces in Chillán after the death of Brigadier Antonio Pareja.

The instructions of Viceroy Abascal were to revive the war against the Chilean insurgents, which had fallen into a state of inactivity. Gaínza embarked from El Callao at the head of a force of 125 chosen men. This was augmented by the addition of 700 militiamen from Chiloé, after the arrival in Chile.

The landing of Gaínza in Arauco on January 31, 1814, could not be prevented by the troops of Bernardo O'Higgins, commander of the insurgents in this sector. In Arauco on February 3, 1814, he met with numerous Mapuches and obtained promises of their support and recognition of old treaties with the crown, as well as the promise of Toqui (War Chief) Mañil to supply 6,000 soldiers.

Gaínza was also able to add the forces of Chillán to his command.

One of his columns, commanded by Ildefonso de Elorriaga, took Talca on March 3, 1814. In this action a small, isolated unit of patriots was massacred. This incident, together with the heroic death of the commander of the insurgents, Colonel Carlos Spano, provoked a political crisis in Santiago. The Superior Governing Council presided over by Agustín Eyzaguirre had abandoned Talca only a few days before, moving towards the capital with nearly all the royalist forces of Talca as their escort. One result of this embarrassing situation was the fall of the Council. Francisco de la Lastra took control of the government as Supreme Director.

The following day (March 4), Gaínza received another stroke of luck from one of his militia units, commanded by Clemente Lataño. This unit took prisoner José Miguel Carrera and Luis Carrera, old chiefs of the patriot army.

The successes of the royalist side had political repercussions among the insurgents. However, the outcome of the campaign became less certain with time. Neither side could achieve a decisive victory. Gaínza and his officers were alternately victorious and defeated in the following actions:

- The Battle of Cucha-Cucha
- The Battle of Gamero
- The Battle of El Quilo
- The Battle of El Membrillar
- The First Battle of Cancha Rayada
- The Battle of Guajardo
- The Battle of Río Claro
- The Battle of Quechereguas

At the conclusion of the last action, on April 5, 1814, both armies were exhausted and in terrible logistic conditions. After three months of operations under Gaínza's command, the royalists had increased the territory under their control, taking Talcahuano and Concepción, but the royalist force had been seriously weakened.

Because of this, the arrival of English Commodore James Hillyar with instructions from Viceroy Abascal to negotiate with the rebels was considered opportune. After negotiations, Gaínza signed the Treaty of Lircay, committing himself to leave the Province of Concepción. In exchange, he obtained promises of loyalty to Ferdinand VII on the part of the patriot envoys, Bernardo O'Higgins and Juan Mackenna.

Everything indicated that the treaty was nothing else except a way in which both sides could obtain a truce. Gaínza did not abandon his positions by the agreed date, nor did the rebels live up to the agreement.

Nevertheless, Viceroy Abascal was infuriated when he read the text of the Treaty of Lircay. He removed Gaínza from command, replacing him with Mariano Osorio. Not content with that, he had Gaínza court martialed in Lima, accused of exceeding his orders.

== Regaining prestige ==
Gaínza had to wait under guard for the conclusion of the court martial in Lima. In 1816, he was acquitted, but his reputation in the army was seriously damaged. Therefore, he moved to Quito, under the jurisdiction of the viceroy of New Granada.

At the beginning of 1820 Gaínza, further separated from superiors who distrusted him, obtained the position of general subinspector of the forces in the Viceroyalty of New Spain (Mexico) and the position of Captain General of Guatemala, with its five provinces: Guatemala, El Salvador, Honduras, Nicaragua and Costa Rica.

The new viceroy of Peru, Joaquín de la Pezuela, protested against this appointment, arguing that Gaínza was sympathetic to the rebels. The acting captain general of Guatemala, Carlos de Urrutia y Montoya, also protested, claiming that Gaínza's advanced age of 67 made him unfit for the position.

== Declaration of independence of Guatemala ==
Gaínza obtained the new position in spite of the opposition of Urrutia (who had suppressed a rebellion in August 1820). He assumed governmental power on March 9, 1821.

In August 1821, Mexico achieved its independence, under the rule of Emperor Agustín de Iturbide. Guatemala was technically a dependency of Mexico (New Spain). Gaínza adapted to the new situation by openly joining the independence side. On September 15, 1821, in the city hall of Guatemala City, the Kingdom of Guatemala was declared independent of Spain. On that day, Gaínza was one of the signers of the Act of Independence of Central America.

The city government decided that their act would have to be ratified by a national congress, to be inaugurated on March 1, 1822. Until that occurred, the royal officials, political, military and administrative, were to remain in their positions. In this way, Gaínza became, de facto, the first head of state of the independent nation of Central America (Jefe político in the words of the Act of Independence).

== The annexation to Mexico ==
However, there was one important point that the Act of Independence of September 15 did not address—the relation of the Kingdom of Guatemala to the recently created Mexican Empire.

On October 29, 1821, Mexican Emperor Iturbide sent Gaínza a message inviting Guatemala to form part of the Empire. Earlier he had written to encourage the Central Americans to send delegates to the constituent congress scheduled to meet in Mexico City. But the new letter ended with the announcement of a more concrete political reality—a large Mexican army had been sent to the border with Guatemala.

Gaínza answered a month later, on December 3, 1821, that it was necessary to consult with various city governments in order to respond to the invitation. He concluded his answer with the words "I hope that Your Excellency will suspend your decisions and stop the advance of your army until the arrival of my answer, which I will send by mail on January 3, 1822."

Two days after that date, Gaínza was able to send his response, although it was not complete. 32 city governments accepted annexation; 104 accepted with conditions; 2 opposed the plan; and another 21 felt that the question could be decided only by the congress scheduled to meet in March.

This last group was correct; although Gaínza's plan to consult the city governments bought some time, it was a clear violation of Article 2 of the Act of Independence: "Congress must decide the point of absolute general independence and fixm, in case of agreement, the form of government and the fundamental law of governance."

In addition, suspicions arose about the count. The secretary of the consultative junta that advised Gaínza, Mariano Gálvez, was accused of having manipulated the results to favor annexation.

But it was also true that many towns (Comayagua, Ciudad Real, Quetzaltenango, Sololá, the intendencias of Nicaragua) joined the Empire on their own initiative, jumping over the chain of command that included Guatemala City. There was much pressure to adopt this decision. Gaínza and the Consultative Provisional Junta thus declared the union of the Kingdom of Guatemala to the Mexican Empire in an act signed January 5, 1822 in Guatemala City.

The consequences included:

- On January 11, 1822, El Salvador denounced the annexation as illegitimate and declared itself in rebellion, and under the direction of José Matías Delgado and Manuel José Arce it prepared for armed resistance.
- On January 23, 1822, Iturbide named Gaínza provisional captain general of Guatemala.
- On February 25, 1822, Gaínza ordered an oath of adhesion to the Mexican Empire.
- On March 30, 1822, Iturbide gave Gaínza the title of lieutenant general of the Kingdom and offered him the position of governor of a province of the Empire or of Nueva Galicia, as a reward for his services. He was appointed Knight of the Grand Cross of the Imperial Order of Our Lady of Guadalupe.
- Gaínza asked for the dispatch of the Mexican troops already at the border (600 men under the command of Vicente Filísola) to Central America.
- On June 12, 1822 Filísola's troops arrived in Guatemala City.
- On June 23, 1822, by order of Iturbide, Gaínza turned over power to Filísola and left the country for Mexico.

== The conclusion ==
As far as is known, Iturbide did not fulfill his promises to Gaínza. The old soldier did not receive the government of a single island. All that is known is that he died in dire poverty in Mexico City around the year 1829.

His widow returned to Guayaquil, with his numerous decorations and an agreement of the city government of Guatemala City that granted her husband a military pension of 10,000 pesos for life annually from 1821, but there is no record that these payments were made.

Political offices
Preceded by None	Captain General of Central America; 1821–1822	Succeeded by Vicente Filísola
Military offices
Preceded by Juan Francisco Sánchez	Captain General of Chile; 1814	Succeeded by Mariano Osorio
