= Malespín's War =

Salvadoran and Honduran invasion of Nicaragua (1844–1845)

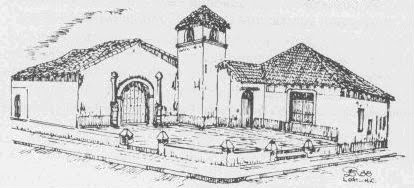
- Sketch of the San Juan de Dios chapel, which was looted by Francisco Malespín's invading forces during the end of the war.
| Date | 25 October 1844 – 13 February 1845 (3 months, 2 weeks and 5 days) |
| Location | Honduras, Nicaragua |
| Result | Allied victory; Peace Treaty signed between Francisco Malespín and José León Sandoval |

Belligerents
| El Salvador; Selva's Nicaragua; Honduras | Nicaragua; Central American Unionists |

Commanders and leaders
| Francisco Malespín; José Trinidad Muñoz; Francisco Ferrera; José Santos Guardiola | Casto Fonseca (executed); Emiliano Madriz (executed); Blas Antonio Sáenz; José Trinidad Cabañas; Gerardo Barrios |

Casualties and losses
| Unknown, but light | Unknown, but heavy |

Malespín's War (Spanish: Guerra de Malespín) was a Salvadoran and Honduran invasion of Nicaragua caused by the election of liberal democrat Manuel Pérez at the time of Central American turmoil dictated by Rafael Carrera's conservative dictatorship in Guatemala.

The war mostly took place in León, which was besieged by the invading forces on 27 November 1844, a siege which would last until 24 January 1845.

== Cause ==
On 1 April 1843 Supreme Director Pablo Buitrago y Benavente resigned and Parliament appointed Juan de Dios Orozco as Acting Supreme Director. Orozco was to oversee public elections, but those failed because no candidate obtained the required majority vote. Because of the failed elections, parliament elected liberal Manuel Pérez, with support from the de facto military dictator of Nicaragua, Casto Fonseca.

This concerned the conservative politicians mainly based in Granada. Under Pérez, Managua's council decided to move the jurisdiction policy of Granada towards the jurisdiction policy of León and Granadans feared that Managua would be controlled militarily by Fonseca, and that the leaders of Leonese liberalism would be a threat to them.

The conservative government in El Salvador under Francisco Malespín had at that time just avoided war with Guatemala after conservative dissidents, led by "liberal-turned-conservative" Manuel José Arce, attempted to invade El Salvador. The Governments of El Salvador and Honduras, led by Francisco Ferrera, then put blame for their internal unrest on the Nicaraguan liberals in León. The Nicaraguan liberals saw this as a threat of invasion, so they attacked Nacaome, Honduras on 23 October 1844, before they could form a military alliance, but were pushed back by the Hondurans. Malespín then began preparing to invade.

== Initial invasion ==
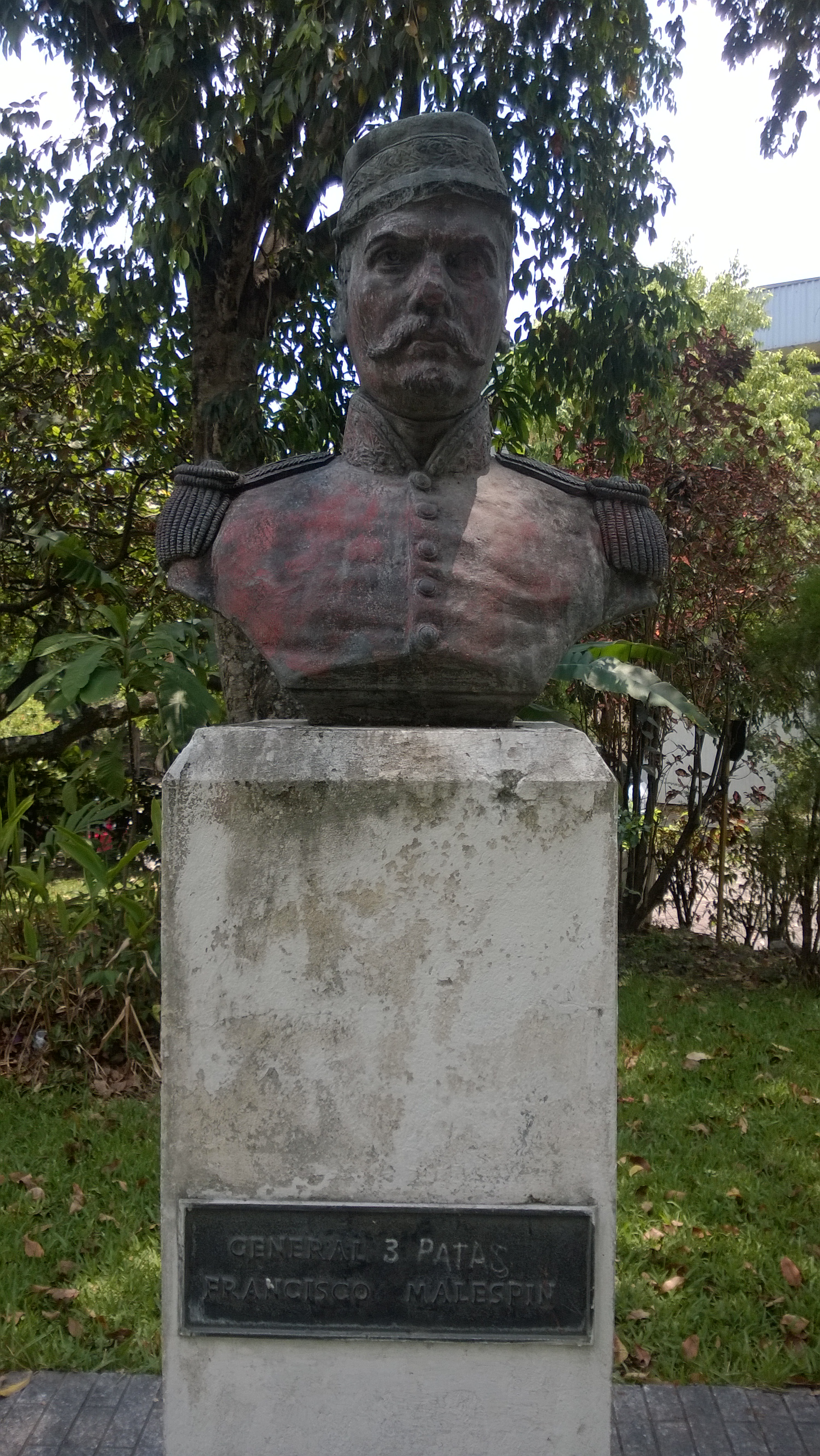
Bust of Francisco Malespín in the University of El Salvador.

On 25 October 1844 Malespín handed over the presidency to his Vice President, Joaquín Eufrasio Guzmán, and the Command of the Army, to his brother Calixto Malespín, and began leading his troops towards Nicaragua with military support from Honduras under José Santos Guardiola.

Manuel Pérez sent the Nicaraguan troops gathering in Chinandega to Chichigalp, thus preventing military action. However, this support given to Malespín provoked parliamentary opposition, and so Pérez was removed from office on 26 September and his duties were replaced by Emiliano Madriz. However, Pérez did not resign voluntarily and continued to work until 4 November.

On the night of 21 November the combined Armies of El Salvador and Honduras, known as the "Ejército Protector de la Paz" under the supreme command of Malespín, with Guardiola as second and José Trinidad Muñoz as third in command, set up camp at the Barranca de San Antonio gorge, and at 8 p.m. on 26 November they reached León and set up camp in the outskirts of the city.

=== Beginning the Siege of León ===
On 27 November at 3 p.m., Malespín, drunk, ordered the first attack, which ended disastrous for the attackers, however, the attack continued until 4 p.m., when allied troops ran out of ammunition and scores of their officers were killed or injured. Disorder ensued and the Honduran troops began to withdraw, but Malespín convinced them to stay in combat, not before Commander Manuel Quijano y García and 64 dragoons had already deserted. The attack continued under the command of Muñoz, who entrenched the following night, and by the morning of the next day, the allied troops were ready for an effective attack.

The Granadans offered their support to Casto Fonseca when he was besieged in León, under a pact to improve the regime; but the "Grand Marshal" replied that the government did not agree with rebels, that the Granadans should proceed as they saw fit, that he reserved giving them the punishment they deserved. The people of Granada had to arrange with Malespín to depose Fonseca's military absolutism as soon as possible. Initially, about 400 Matagalpa archers enlisted in the defense of León against the invading army, but due to the mistreatment they received from the liberal "Grand Marshal" and the breaking of the liberal-conservative alliance, they joined the occupying forces.

=== Situation in the capital ===
Some officers believed that Fonseca, though brave, was not competent enough to make a proper defense. José María Valle, "El Chelon", suggested that Fonseca hand over command to José Trinidad Cabañas. Fonseca considered the suggestion an insult, and consequently Valle withdrew and Cabañas became an object of suspicion for Fonseca. Faced with Fonseca's ineptitude and intransigence, Supreme Director Madriz took command of the defenses, which had to withstand 89 days of siege. The defense of Sutiava was entrusted to Gerardo Barrios.

== Attempted peace negotiations ==
In an attempt to avoid war, when the invading forces reached Barranca de San Antonio on 21 November, peace negotiations began at the hacienda "Satoca" located southeast of Somotillo. The Nicaraguan negotiators were Hermenegildo Zepeda and Gerónimo Carcache. The bases of the negotiations were set in León and they were categorically rejected.

On 1 December the peace negotiations resumed. The Nicaraguan delegates were Canon Desiderio Cortés and Anselmo Alarcón, representing León, José Francisco del Montenegro, Granada and Juan Ruiz, Rivas. Malespín insisted on imposing onerous conditions and the Leonese delegates withdrew.

== Selva's government ==
The differences between the Nicaraguans surfaced and the conservatives from Granada abandoned the liberals in León and on 8 December they sought support from the invading leader. Thus, Granada sided with Malespin, followed by Rivas.

Montenegro and Ruiz were the ambassadors sent by Granada and Rivas to Malespín, with the result of the creation of a provisional government in charge of Silvestre Selva based in Masaya, without the consent of León under siege. José María Estrada, future President of Nicaragua, was appointed Minister General.

After the establishment of Selva's Government, the eastern and southern departments recognised Malespin as "Protector of Nicaraguans" and even organised a regiment to serve under Selva, until the end of war.

=== Counter government ===
In early 1845, Blas Antonio Sáenz and José León Sandoval formed a counter-government against Selva in Masaya, where Sáenz was formally declared Supreme Director on 20 January. Also in early January 1845, Malespin appointed José Trinidad Muñoz as the new General Commander of Arms and began heading to León once again.

== Sutiava fire ==
A shipment of weapons for the Leonese, on a ship docked at the port of El Realejo in the department of Chinandega, accidentally fell into the hands of the invading forces (Malespin actually obtained information from an Englishman named Manning, an agent of Selva's government). Among the captured armament were 1,000 muskets and 200 rifles, in addition to 200 barrels of gunpowder, 200 quintals of lead, and 12,000 flints.

With the newly found equipment, on 22 January 1845, Salvadoran commanders Manuel Quijano y García and Ramón Belloso ordered the Matagalpa archers to set fire to the straw houses of Sutiava and occupied it, allowing the advance towards León.

=== Massacre of León ===
When Malespín entered León he executed many prominent citizens of Leonese society at the time, including Minister General Crescencio Navas, Supreme Director Emiliano Madriz and General Commander Casto Fonseca. He also allowed his troops to abuse the civilian population by raping women and stealing religious treasures from churches and houses as payment for "war expenses". The only house exempt from looting was Manning's.

He also ordered a raid on the atrium of the chapel San Juan de Dios, and the execution of priest Dionisio Urcuyo y Crespín, for defending the sick who were being massacred in the hospital Santa Catarina Mártir of which he was chaplain being parish priest of the church Saint John the Baptist of Sutiaba. A commemorative plaque was placed on the wall of the atrium where Father Crespin was executed. Canon Desiderio Cortés was also executed, but the liberal leaders, Cabañas and Barrios, managed to escape and return to El Salvador.

Malespín then appointed Silvestre Selva in León, after he was overthrown in Masaya.

== Overthrow of Malespín and peace treaty ==
The Vice President of El Salvador, Joaquín Eufrasio Guzmán, conducted a coup against Malespin on 2 February 1845 and was joined by the greater part of the inhabitants of the capital, and a portion of the general's small army. They deposed Malespin and Guzmán assumed the executive office.

When Malespin, still in Nicaragua, heard of the news, he immediately accepted a negotiating delegation from Hermenegildo Zepeda and Gerónimo Carcache. In the Peace Treaty it stated that El Salvador and Honduras were to pay expenses for the lootings and massacres, as well as return all stolen weaponry, the resegaition of José Trinidad Muñoz to the governorship of León, and the extradition of Joaquín Rivera, Maximo Orellana, Miguel Álvarez Castro, José Trinidad Cabañas, Gerardo Barrios, Diego Vigil y Cocaña and Ramon Vijil. The corresponding peace treaty was signed by José León Sandoval, thus ending the war on 13 February 1845.

=== Attempted return to power ===
Because of the murders of Dionisio Urcuyo y Crespín and Desiderio Cortés, Bishop Jorge de Viteri y Ungo excommunicated Malespin on 23 February in the Cathedral of San Salvador. Malespín then left for Honduras where he received protection from President Coronado Chávez.

In late 1846, backed by forces from Honduras, Malespin invaded El Salvador to recover the presidency and he began marching towards San Salvador. He was assassinated by a group of indigenous people in the town of San Fernando on 25 November of the same year. His body was decapitated and his skull is still hung in Ciudad Delgado, where it is known as the "Cuesta de la Calavera".
