= List of wars involving Nicaragua =

This is a list of wars involving the Republic of Nicaragua.

Conflict	Combatant 1	Combatant 2	Results	Head of state
Nicaraguan Independence Movements (1811–1812)	Nicaraguan revolutionaries	Spanish Empire	Defeat: Revolts suppressed	José de Salvador y Antoli
Civil war of 1824 (1824)	Fiebres	Timbucos	Fiebres victory: José Anacleto Ordóñez is given the position of "Inspector General of Arms of the Federal Republic of Central America"	José Anacleto Ordóñez
Cerda-Argüello War (1827–1828)	Liberal Federalists	Conservative Federalists	Liberal victory: Execution of Manuel Antonio de la Cerda	Juan Argüello del Castillo
Flores' Rebellion (1834)	Nicaraguan Government	Anti-Constitutionalist Rebels	Government victory: Cándido Flores is defeated in Managua and later flees Granada	José Núñez
Invasion of Guanacaste (1836)	Nicaragua; Costa Ricans exiled	Costa Rica	Defeat: Withdrawal of Nicaraguan forces	Manuel Quijano
Malespín's War (1844–1845)	Nicaragua; Central American Unionists	El Salvador; Selva's Nicaragua; Honduras	Allied victory: Peace Treaty signed between Francisco Malespín and José León Sandoval	Emiliano Madriz Blas Antonio Sáenz Silvestre Selva
Recapture of San Juan del Norte (1848)	Nicaragua	United Kingdom; Kingdom of Mosquitia	Defeat: Nicaragua returned San Juan del Norte to Mosquitia.	José María Guerrero
Granada-León Civil War (1853–1855)	Legitimists	Democrats	Stalemate: Francisco Castellón hires William Walker and his mercenaries; The war continues as the Filibuster War	Fruto Chamorro Francisco Castellón
Filibuster War (1855–1857)	Allied Central American Army; Nicaragua; Costa Rica; El Salvador; Guatemala; Honduras; Legitimist Party	Filibusters; Walker's Nicaragua; Democratic Party	Central American alliance victory	Fruto Chamorro William Walker
Barrios' War of Reunification (1885)	El Salvador; Mexico; Costa Rica; Nicaragua	Guatemala; Honduras	Anti-Barrios victory: Failure to reunify Central America; Death of Justo Rufino Barrios	Adán Cárdenas
Nicaragua Crisis of 1895 (1894–1895)	Nicaragua	United Kingdom	Victory: Establishment of the Zelaya Department	José Santos Zelaya
Honduran Civil War (1906–1907)	Liberal Rebels; Nicaragua	Honduras; El Salvador	Victory: Dávila becomes President of Honduras	José Santos Zelaya
Estrada's Rebellion (1909–1910)	(Nicaragua) Liberal Government	(Nicaragua) Conservative Rebels; United States	Regime change: Estrada recognized as President of Nicaragua	José Santos Zelaya
Mena's Rebellion (1912)	(Nicaragua) Conservative Government; United States	(Nicaragua) Liberal Rebels	Government victory: Liberal rebels exiled to Panama	Adolfo Díaz
World War I (1918)	Allied Powers: France; United Kingdom; and Empire: Australia; Canada; Ceylon; Egypt; Newfoundland; New Zealand; India; South Africa; Russia (until 1917) (Note: The Russian Empire during 1914–1917, the Russian Republic during 1917. The Bolsheviks signed an armistice followed by a separate peace shortly after their armed seizure of power.); Italy (from 1915); United States (from 1917); Japan; Nicaragua; and others ...	Central Powers: Germany; Austria-Hungary; Ottoman Empire; Bulgaria (from 1915); and others ...	Allied Powers victory (see Aftermath of World War I)	Emiliano Chamorro Vargas
Constitutionalist War (1926 –1927)	(Nicaragua) Nicaraguan Government (Conservatives); Supported by: United States	(Nicaragua) Nicaraguan rebels (Liberals); Supported by: Mexico (provided weapons and supplies)	Peace of Tipitapa: Both sides agree to a presidential election to be supervised by the United States, with Adolfo Díaz remaining in power until then.; Both sides agree to disarm.; The Nicaraguan National Guard is established.	Emiliano Chamorro Vargas
Sandinistas War (1927–1933)	(Nicaragua) Conservative Government; United States	(Nicaragua) Sandinistas	Government victory: Sandinistas surrender their weapons	Adolfo Díaz
World War II (1941–1945)	Allies; United States; Soviet Union; United Kingdom; China; France; Poland; Canada; Australia; New Zealand; India; South Africa; Yugoslavia; Greece; Denmark; Norway; Netherlands; Belgium; Luxembourg; Czechoslovakia; Brazil; Mexico; Panama; Costa Rica; El Salvador; Guatemala; Honduras; Nicaragua; Dominican Republic; Cuba	Axis; Germany; Japan; Italy; Hungary; Romania; Bulgaria; Croatia; Slovakia; Finland; Thailand; Manchukuo; Mengjiang	Allied victory	Anastasio Somoza García
Costa Rican Civil War (1948)	Government of Costa Rica; Calderon forces People's Vanguard Party; Nicaraguan National Guard	National Liberation Army; Ulatista Forces; Caribbean Legion; Supported by: Guatemala; United States	Rebel victory: Overthrow of authoritarian president Teodoro Picado Michalski; Installation of a provisional government led by transitional president José Figueres Ferrer; Costa Rican military abolished after nearly half a century of its establishment; Constitutional assembly is elected; A new Constitution is created and enacted; Provisional government transfers power to Otilio Ulate	Víctor Manuel Román
Invasion of Costa Rica (1955)	Calderón forces Supported by: Nicaragua; Venezuela; Dominican Republic Guatemala (Diplomatic Support)	Costa Rica; Supported by: United States Organization of American States	Costa Rican government victory	Anastasio Somoza García
Dominican Civil War (1965)	Loyalist faction United States IAPF: Brazil; Paraguay; Nicaragua; Costa Rica; El Salvador; Honduras	Constitutionalist faction: Dominican Revolutionary Party; Social Christian Revolutionary Party; June 14th Revolutionary Movement	Loyalist victory: Ceasefire declared; Formation of the provisional government for new elections; Deposition of Juan Bosch of the presidency ratified; Organization of presidential elections in 1966 under international supervision; Election of Joaquín Balaguer as the new president; Establishment of the Fourth Dominican Republic on July 1, 1966	René Schick
Nicaraguan Revolution (1961–1990)	(Nicaragua) Somoza regime (1961–1979): National Guard; Contras (1981–1990): FDN; UDN; ARDE; MILPAS; Fifteenth of September Legion; KISAN/YATAMA; Supported by: United States: CIA; Honduras (from 1981) Other supporters: El Salvador; Guatemala (from 1983); Costa Rica (1982–1986); Panama (1981–1987 under Manuel Noriega); Chile (from 1973); Argentina (1976–1983); Israel; Saudi Arabia; Imperial State of Iran (until 1979); Islamic Republic of Iran (from 1979, indirectly); People's Republic of China; Poland; Romania; Taiwan; Colombia; Brazil; Portugal; Brunei	Sandinista National Liberation Front; MAP-ML (1978–1979); MILPAS; Junta of National Reconstruction (from 1979); Panama (1978–1979); Supported by: Cuba: Dirección de Inteligencia; Soviet Union Other supporters: East Germany (until 1989); Yugoslavia; Hungary (until 1989); Libya; North Korea; Bulgaria; Czechoslovakia (until 1989); Palestine Liberation Organization; Poland (until 1989); Algeria; France; Costa Rica (1978–1982); Mexico; Sweden (medical support); Canada (1984–1990, developmental aid); Venezuela (1978–1979); Chile (1970-1973); FPMR	Sandinista victory: Anastasio Somoza Debayle resigns and flees to Miami in July 1979, relinquishing control of the government.; A five-member provisional government takes its place.; The right-wing Contras begin an armed insurgency against the Sandinistas in 1981 which continues until 1990.; The Tela Accord is signed in 1989 and the Sandinista party is defeated in the 1990 election, bringing the armed revolution to an end.; Sandinistas led by Daniel Ortega are re-elected in 2006 and remain in power until today.	Anastasio Somoza Debayle Daniel Ortega
Miskito Conflict (1982–1987)	Nicaragua	Miskito Guerrillas	Victory: Guerillas defeated	Daniel Ortega
Operation Golden Pheasant (1988)	Nicaragua	United States; Honduras	Defeat: Withdrawal of Nicaraguan forces from Honduran territory	Daniel Ortega
Iraq War (2003–2004)	Iraq; Iraqi Kurdistan; MNF–I: United States; United Kingdom; South Korea; Italy; Poland; Australia; Georgia; Ukraine; Netherlands; Romania; Bulgaria; Denmark; Thailand; Spain; El Salvador; Honduras; Nicaragua; Dominican Republic	(Iraq) SCJL (Iraq) Naqshbandi Army ISI al-Qaeda (Iraq) FIA; Ansar al-Islam; IAI Mahdi Army; Special Groups; Badr Brigades; Kata'ib Hezbollah	Victory: Depletion of Iraqi insurgency, improvements in public security; Re-establishment of democratic elections; U.S.-Iraq Status of Forces Agreement	Enrique Bolaños
Isla Calero Conflict (2010)	Nicaragua	Costa Rica	Defeat: Withdrawal of Nicaraguan soldiers from Costa Rican territory; The International Court of Justice states that Costa Rica has sovereignty over the disputed territory	Daniel Ortega
