= Chinandega =

- Municipality
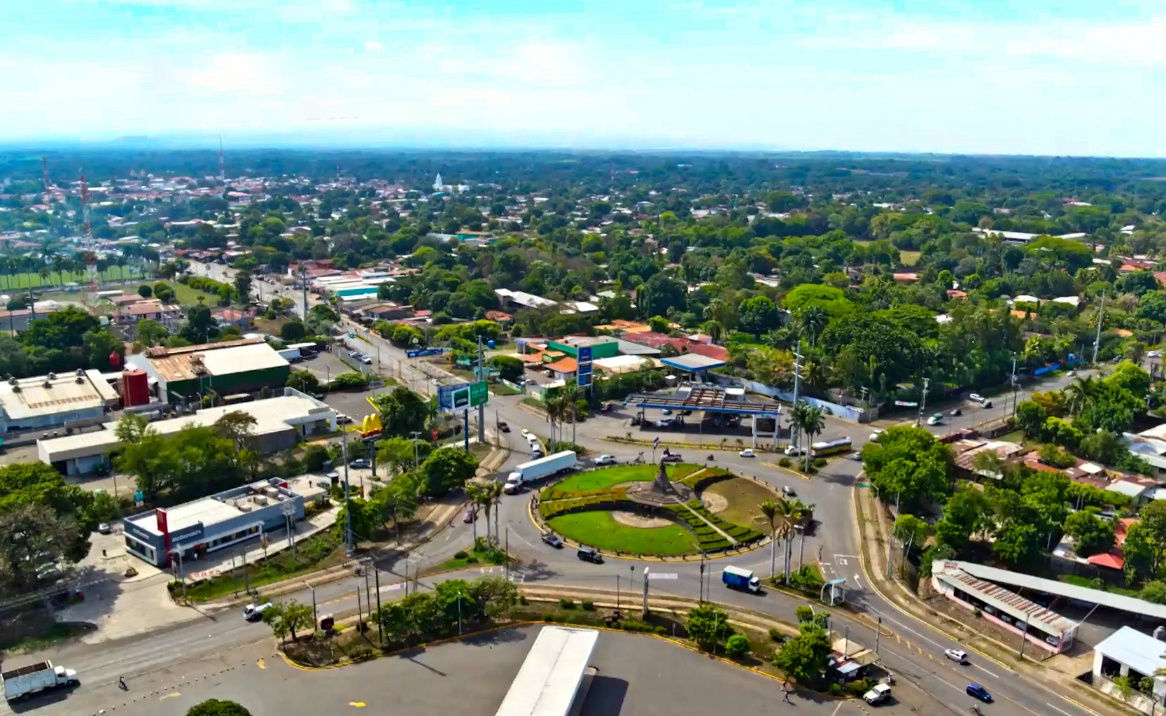
- Chinandega main roundabout.

- Flag Seal

- Location in Nicaragua
- Coordinates: 12°37′N 87°09′W
- Country: Nicaragua
- Department: Chinandega Department

Area
  - Municipality: 687 km^{2} (265 sq mi)

Population (2022 estimate)
  - Municipality: 137,539
  - Density: 200/km^{2} (519/sq mi)
  - Urban: 115,067 (6th Nicaragua)

Chinandega (Spanish pronunciation: [tʃinanˈdeɣa]) is a city and the departmental seat of Chinandega department in Nicaragua. It is also the administrative centre of the surrounding municipality of the same name. It is Nicaragua's 2nd most important city (economy) and 6th largest city, with a population of 115,067 (2022 estimate), and a total of 137,539 in the municipality. It is located about 134 kilometres (83 mi) northwest of Managua and about 72 kilometres (45 mi) southwest of El Guasaule, on the border with Honduras. Chinandega is situated about 20 kilometres (12 mi) from the Pacific Ocean.

The city is served by Chinandega Airport.

The region around Chinandega produces agricultural products, particularly oil, flour, peanuts, shrimp, and sugarcane, and distilled liquors.

The city's weather is warm and humid due to its location at a low altitude in the tropics.

== Geography ==
Located near the Nicaraguan border with Honduras, Chinandega sits on the CA-1 (Pan-American Highway). The department of Chinandega is 4,929 square kilometres (1,903 sq mi) in area and has a population of 378,970 distributed among thirteen municipalities: Chinandega (department seat), El Viejo, Corinto, Chichigalpa, Posoltega, El Realejo, Puerto Morazán, Villanueva, Somotillo, Santo Tomás del Norte, San Juan de Cinco Pinos, San Pedro del Norte and San Francisco del Norte.

Location of Chinandega department

The department has numerous beaches, natural reserves, historic towns, mangroves, and ancient churches; the volcano of San Cristóbal, the highest in Nicaragua, can be found here, as well as the other volcanoes of the San Cristóbal complex (El Chonco, Moyotepe, and Casita), and further east, the peninsula-forming Cosigüina volcano.

Chinandega is a center of agriculture growing sugarcane, bananas, peanuts, sesame seeds, cashews, oranges, and grains. It is a shrimping and fishing center and it manufactures salt and leather goods. The city is also home to the largest sugar mills and rum factory (Flor de Caña) in the country.

Natives of the department include Salomón Ibarra Mayorga, writer of the national anthem of Nicaragua; Tino López Guerra, composer of "Rey del Corrido"; the priest Tomás Ruiz, and athletes Vicente Padilla and Próspero González.

=== Climate ===
This area typically has a pronounced dry season. According to the Köppen Climate Classification system, Chinandega has a tropical savanna climate, abbreviated "Aw" on climate maps.

Climate data for Chinandega (1971–1990)
Month	Jan	Feb	Mar	Apr	May	Jun	Jul	Aug	Sep	Oct	Nov	Dec	Year
Mean daily maximum °C (°F)	34.5 (94.1)	35.4 (95.7)	36.1 (97.0)	36.4 (97.5)	34.2 (93.6)	32.6 (90.7)	33.4 (92.1)	33.2 (91.8)	31.9 (89.4)	31.9 (89.4)	32.4 (90.3)	33.4 (92.1)	33.8 (92.8)
Daily mean °C (°F)	26.4 (79.5)	27.2 (81.0)	28.0 (82.4)	28.7 (83.7)	27.9 (82.2)	26.6 (79.9)	26.9 (80.4)	26.8 (80.2)	26.0 (78.8)	26.0 (78.8)	26.1 (79.0)	26.1 (79.0)	26.9 (80.4)
Mean daily minimum °C (°F)	18.9 (66.0)	19.4 (66.9)	20.6 (69.1)	22.3 (72.1)	23.3 (73.9)	22.7 (72.9)	22.2 (72.0)	22.2 (72.0)	22.3 (72.1)	22.1 (71.8)	21.1 (70.0)	19.6 (67.3)	21.4 (70.5)
Average precipitation mm (inches)	1 (0.0)	0 (0)	7 (0.3)	14 (0.6)	309 (12.2)	313 (12.3)	193 (7.6)	271 (10.7)	404 (15.9)	330 (13.0)	63 (2.5)	84 (3.3)	1,988 (78.3)
Average precipitation days (≥ 1.0 mm)	0	0	1	2	12	16	13	16	20	18	6	1	105
Mean monthly sunshine hours	265.3	248.5	261.8	206.8	183.7	168.2	204.2	199.9	173.9	204.2	211.0	255.2	2,582.7
Source: National Oceanic and Atmospheric Administration

== History ==
The city of Chinandega has been nicknamed "the City of Oranges" (Ciudad de las Naranjas) and "the Hot City" (Ciudad Cálida). Its name is of Nahuatl origin; although its exact meaning is disputed, it may come from the words Chinamitl-tacalt, "place surrounded by reeds."

Chinandega was a small city during the colonial era, but its location among fertile flatlands and its position as a commercial center led to its eventual rise in importance. The Spanish chronicler Friar Antonio Vázquez Espinoza in his compendium and description of the West Indies described his 1613 visit to Chinandega:

"The town of Chinandega is comprised of many Indians, plentiful corn, and all of the fruits of the earth, and appears to be a piece of paradise."

Officially a settlement (poblado) from 1796, the city was planned by engineer Antonio Rojas. On March 30, 1835, a law was instituted that established a fair on December 8 of every year.

On March 15, 1836, during the government of José Núñez, it received the title of town (villa), and on September 2, 1839, it received the title of city.

On November 1, 1998, Chinandega was hit by massive flooding caused by Hurricane Mitch. The flooding resulted in many thousands of people losing their homes, as well as damages to infrastructure which had not been repaired as of 2009.

== Churches ==
=== Our Lady Santa Ana Parish ===
In accordance with its colonial past and colonial-era urban planning, the city is centered around a central park with the Romanesque-style Our Lady Santa Ana Colonial Church. It has withstood over a century of violent storms, earthquakes, and wars. The church was severely affected by an earthquake in 1885, and was later rebuilt into its current state. This is not the location of the original building in the seventeenth century, however. According to documents from Bishop Morel of Santa Cruz dated June 1751, "This church owns three naves on the river, with its sacristy and choir close by, two small bells, limestone walls, and tiled floors". Two ancient doors in Antigueño style open on the north and south flanks of the church; these survived the earthquakes, including the 1925 earthquake that damaged the façade and towers.

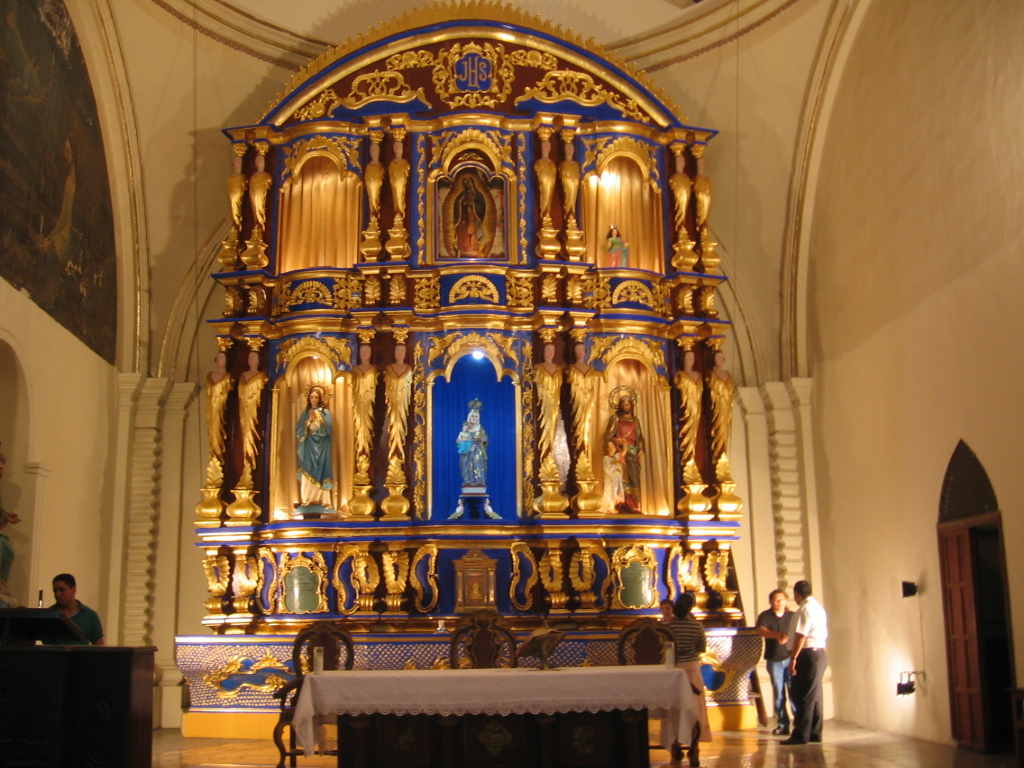
Our Lady Santa Ana Colonial Church

The feast day of Saint Anne is celebrated on July 26 of every year.

The church has been restored to its former colonial splendor, and awaits the announcement that will make it the seat of a new diocese, with the church itself becoming elevated to the status of cathedral.

=== El Calvario Parish ===
El Calvario ("Calvary") Parish is located in the neighborhood of the same name, and was built in 1874 by Bishop Monsignor Manuel Ulloa y Calvo. The first structure here was of adobe, but on October 11, 1885, this was destroyed by an earthquake and later rebuilt. Its patron is the Holy Name of Jesus, celebrated on the last Sunday of January every year. On May 17, the feast day of Saint Pascal Baylon is also celebrated in the parish. The church was recently restored by the COEN Foundation.

=== Sanctuary of Our Lady of Guadalupe ===
Of recent construction, its origins lie in a structure built in 1855 but destroyed in an earthquake in 1885. It was originally built as an offering to Our Lady of Guadalupe during an outbreak of cholera. After the outbreak, an image of Our Lady of Guadalupe was first displayed in the church on December 25, 1856, and Pope Pius IX elevated the church to the rank of sanctuary, the first church in Central America to earn this title. It was restored by the COEN Foundation and its principal feast day is celebrated on December 12, with processions during Holy Week being celebrated here as well.

=== Saint Anthony Church (Iglesia San Antonio) ===
This church also suffered from severe damage during the 1885 earthquake, after which it was enlarged. The church was unofficially associated with the city's aristocracy; elaborate weddings between members of the aristocracy were celebrated within its walls. In 1923, with the arrival of the Franciscans at the church, it was completely rebuilt. Its principal feast day falls on June 13 every year. There is also a procession that is held on January 1 of every year.

== Colonial buildings ==
Chinandega has many colonial-era buildings, though not to the extent of the Nicaraguan cities of León and Granada, since many of them were damaged during a 1928 bombardment by the Liberal forces, who had revolted against Conservative Adolfo Díaz. Most of the city was destroyed, and only the churches remained unharmed. The city does not have a code that protects colonial architecture as León and Granada do.

== Culture ==
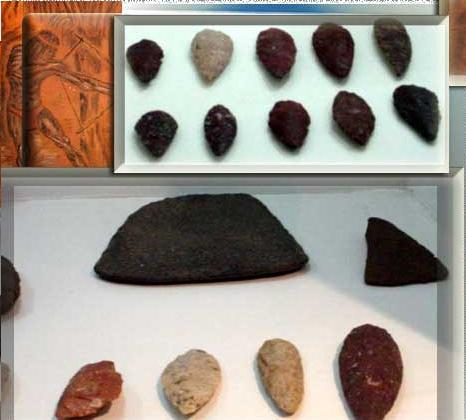
Artifacts in the Museo Municipal de Chinandega

Chinandega's cultural and historical riches date from before the Spanish conquest, when this region was inhabited by various Mesoamerican peoples, who had perhaps originated from the north, possibly from present-day Mexico. There is a museum in the city, "Enrique Mantica Deshon", which contains 1,200 archaeological artifacts of Pre-Columbian origin. There is also a municipal theater called "Rodrigo Callejas" which can seat 400 people.

== Sports ==
Chinandega is home to two football clubs who have both played in the country's top tier in recent years: Chinandega FC and VCP Chinandega. They share the Estadio Efraín Tijerino Mazariego in the northwest of town near the airport. Tigres de Chinandega also call the city home as a member of the Nicaragua Professional Baseball League. Several Major League Baseball players have been a member of Los Tigres, including Mark Minicozzi.

== Notable people ==
- Reynaldo Aguado Montealegre (born 1960), human rights activist
- Carlos Alonso (born 1979), former footballer
- Elí Altamirano (1934-2006), politician and trade unionist
- Russel Carrero (1950–1990), Olympic sprinter
- Oswaldo Mairena (born 1975) former relief pitcher for the Chicago Cubs and Florida Marlins
- Hermógenes L. Mora (born 1979), poet and writer
- Ana Violeta Navarro-Cárdenas (born 1971), political strategist and commentator
- Vicente Padilla (born 1977), former pitcher for the Philadelphia Phillies, Texas Rangers, Los Angeles Dodgers and Boston Red Sox
- Ileana Rodríguez (born 1939), academic in Latin American studies
- Bismarck Veliz (born 1993), footballer
- Samuel Wilson (born 1983), footballer
