= Tomás Valladares =

Nicaraguan politician

Brigadier Tomás Valladares

Supreme Director of Nicaragua Acting
- In office 7 November 1839 – 21 September 1840
- Preceded by: Hilario Ulloa (Acting)
- Succeeded by: Patricio Rivas (Acting)

Personal details
- Born: 1780
- Died: 1850s
- Political party: Democratic
- Children: Juan de la Cruz Valladares
- Occupation: Politician, military officer

Tomás Valladares (1780 – 1850s) was a liberal Nicaraguan politician, military officer with the rank of brigadier, member of the Democratic Party, and staunch Central American Unionist who served as acting Supreme Director of Nicaragua from 7 November 1839 to 21 September 1840. His son was Juan de la Cruz Valladares.

== Biography ==
=== Early career ===
Francisco Morazán had occupied Guatemala City in April 1829 and on 12 May 1830, released Dionisio de Herrera from prison and appointed him as Head of State of Nicaragua. On 1 March 1833 Herrera called a parliament, which would confirm him in this function. Valladares came to this vote as a delegate. He published his dissenting vote and reported the lack of freedom of choice for the delegates, since many people had come to the voting site, made mood for Herrera from the galleries and threatened dissenting voting behavior.

=== As Supreme Director ===
He was appointed a Brigadier by the Assembly when Casto Fonseca was appointed Grand Marshal in April 1839, and was handed over the position of Supreme Director after Hilario Ulloa stepped down on 7 November 1839, serving until 21 September 1840 when he handed over power to Patricio Rivas.

=== Later career ===
He was president of the Nicaraguan Congress from 1841 to 1843. In 1843, under the idea of Morazán's original attempt at restoring the Federal Republic of Central America before his execution in Costa Rica, Valladares commanded Nicaraguan troops trying to bring former Honduran Head of State, Joaquín Rivera Bragas, to power in El Salvador. They were subsequently defeated.

He was also defeated by Francisco Malespín in Choluteca, after attempting to lead a counter invasion into Honduras during Malespín's War.

== Publications ==
- Tomás Valladares: El senador que ejerce el S. P. E del estado de Nicaragua, á los habitantes del mismo, León, March 24, 1840, reprinted in Andrés Vega Bolaños: Gobernantes de Nicaragua, 82., 1944.

Political offices
| Preceded by Hilario Ulloa (acting) | Supreme Director of Nicaragua (acting); 1839 – 1840 | Succeeded by Patricio Rivas (acting) |
