= List of Hispanic American caudillos =

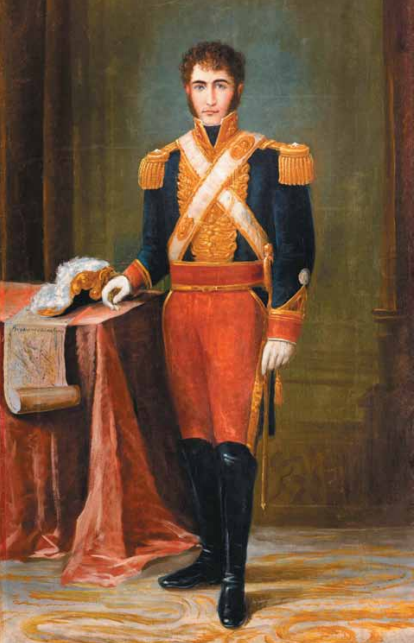
Carlos de Montúfar, considered one of the main Libertadores of Ecuador, and also considered the first Caudillo.

A caudillo (Spanish pronunciation: [kawˈdiʎo]; Old Spanish: cabdillo, from Latin capitellum, diminutive of caput "head". Caudillo means "little head" or "little chief") is part of the larger Iberian tradition of authoritarian leaders, with roots in the Iberian past, particularly in the Reconquista. A number of military leaders who were part of the Spanish American struggle for independence took on political roles in during the establishment of new sovereign nation-states. The establishment of military strong men as the head of new national governments did not generally come via elections, but many did have strong popular support. Caudillos often have a personalist connection with their popular followers, combining charisma and machismo ("manliness") and access to political and economic power. They often desire to legitimize their rule. Many caudillos brought order to their areas of control, but also resorted to violence with their armed supporters to achieve it. The early nineteenth century has been considered the "Age of Caudillos," but authoritarian regimes existed in the twentieth century as well, with caudillismo casting a long shadow.

== List of caudillos ==
=== Argentina ===
- José Félix Aldao
- Gregorio Aráoz de Lamadrid
- Nazario Benavídez
- Pedro Castelli
- Manuel Dorrego
- Pascual Echagüe
- Pedro Ferré
- Andrés Guazurary
- Santos Guayama
- Martín Miguel de Güemes
- Alejandro Heredia
- Juan Felipe Ibarra
- Juan Lavalle
- Estanislao López
- Ricardo López Jordán
- Bartolomé Mitre
- José María Paz
- Ángel Vicente Peñaloza
- Juan Perón
- Juan Facundo Quiroga
- Francisco Ramírez
- Julio Argentino Roca
- Juan Manuel de Rosas
- Juan Saá
- Antonino Taboada
- Justo José de Urquiza
- Felipe Varela
- Juan de Dios Videla

=== Bolivia ===
- José Ballivián
- Hugo Banzer
- Germán Busch
- Antonio Huachaca
- Manuel Isidoro Belzu
- Hilarión Daza
- Mariano Melgarejo
- Andrés de Santa Cruz
- Óscar Únzaga
- José Miguel de Velasco

=== Chile ===
- Arturo Alessandri
- Vicente Benavides
- José Miguel Carrera
- Ramón Freire
- Carlos Ibáñez del Campo
- Manuel Montt Torres
- Bernardo O'Higgins
- Augusto Pinochet
- Diego Portales
- José Joaquín Prieto

=== Colombia ===
- Sergio Arboleda
- Tomás Cipriano de Mosquera
- Jorge Eliécer Gaitán
- Alfonso López Pumarejo
- Rafael Núñez
- Aquileo Parra
- Gustavo Rojas Pinilla
- Rafael Uribe Uribe
- Marceliano Vélez

=== Costa Rica ===
- José Figueres Ferrer
- José María Castro Madriz, "Founder of the Republic"
- Juan Rafael Mora Porras
- Gregorio José Ramírez

=== Cuba ===
- Ignacio Agramonte
- Fulgencio Batista
- Fidel Castro
- Carlos Manuel de Céspedes
- Máximo Gómez
- Antonio Maceo

=== Dominican Republic ===
- Buenaventura Báez
- Joaquín Balaguer
- José Núñez de Cáceres
- Pedro Santana
- Rafael Trujillo, "The Benefactor"

=== Ecuador ===
- Juan José Flores
- Carlos de Montúfar, "The First Caudillo"
- Juan Pío de Montúfar
- Pedro de Montúfar
- Gabriel García Moreno
- Eloy Alfaro
- José María Velasco Ibarra
- José Joaquín de Olmedo

=== El Salvador ===
- Manuel José Arce
- Gerardo Barrios
- Francisco Dueñas
- Francisco Malespín
- Maximiliano Hernández Martínez
- Santiago González
- Tomás Regalado

=== Guatemala ===
- Justo Rufino Barrios
- Rafael Carrera
- Manuel Estrada Cabrera
- Serapio Cruz
- Miguel García Granados
- Efraín Ríos Montt
- Jorge Ubico

=== Honduras ===
- Tiburcio Carías Andino
- Luis Bográn
- Policarpo Bonilla
- José Trinidad Cabañas
- Francisco Ferrera
- Francisco Morazán
- José Cecilio del Valle, "The Wise"

=== Mexico ===
- Miguel Hidalgo
- Ignacio Allende
- Juan Aldama
- Juan Álvarez
- Plutarco Elías Calles, "El Jefe Máximo"
- Lázaro Cárdenas
- Venustiano Carranza, "Primer Jefe"
- Saturnino Cedillo
- Adolfo de la Huerta
- Porfirio Díaz
- Vicente Guerrero
- Agustín Guzmán, "Héroe Altense"
- Victoriano Huerta
- Agustín de Iturbide
- Manuel Lozada, "El Tigre de Alica"
- Francisco Xavier Mina
- Juan Cortina
- Ignacio Pesqueira
- José María Morelos
- Álvaro Obregón
- Pascual Orozco
- Antonio López de Santa Anna
- Santiago Vidaurri
- Pancho Villa, "The Centaur of the North"
- Emiliano Zapata

=== Nicaragua ===
- Juan Argüello
- Manuel Antonio de la Cerda
- Anastasio Somoza Debayle
- Casto Fonseca
- Anastasio Somoza García
- Bernardo Méndez de Figueroa, "El Pavo"
- José Trinidad Muñoz
- José Anacleto Ordóñez
- Daniel Ortega
- Augusto César Sandino
- Fulgencio Vega
- José Santos Zelaya

=== Panama ===
- Juan Eligio Alzuru
- José Domingo Espinar
- Tomás de Herrera
- José de Fábrega, "Liberator of the Isthmus"
- Manuel Noriega
- Omar Torrijos

=== Paraguay ===
- Eusebio Ayala
- José Gaspar Rodríguez de Francia, "El Supremo"
- Rafael Franco
- Carlos Antonio López
- Francisco Solano López
- Alfredo Stroessner

=== Peru ===
- Óscar Benavides
- Andrés Avelino Cáceres
- Ramón Castilla
- Luis Miguel Sánchez Cerro
- Alberto Fujimori
- Agustín Gamarra
- Antonio Gutiérrez de la Fuente
- Miguel Iglesias
- Augusto B. Leguía
- Lizardo Montero Flores
- Domingo Nieto
- Manuel Odría
- Nicolás de Piérola
- Felipe Santiago Salaverry
- Juan Crisóstomo Torrico
- Manuel Ignacio de Vivanco

=== Puerto Rico ===
- Francisco Ramírez Medina
- Manuel Rojas

=== Uruguay ===
- Gregorio Conrado Álvarez
- Timoteo Aparicio
- José Gervasio Artigas
- José Batlle y Ordóñez
- Venancio Flores
- Leandro Gómez
- Juan Antonio Lavalleja
- Lorenzo Latorre
- Manuel Oribe
- Fructuoso Rivera
- Aparicio Saravia

=== Venezuela ===
- José Tomás Boves
- Cipriano Castro
- Joaquín Crespo
- Juan Crisóstomo Falcón
- Juan Vicente Gómez
- Antonio Guzmán Blanco
- Santiago Mariño
- José Tadeo Monagas
- José Antonio Páez
- Marcos Pérez Jiménez
- Manuel Piar
- Carlos Rangel Garbiras
- José Félix Ribas
- José Antonio Yáñez
- Ezequiel Zamora
- Hugo Chávez
- Nicolás Maduro

== See also ==
- Caudillo
- Continuismo
