= Joaquín del Cossío =

President of Nicaragua

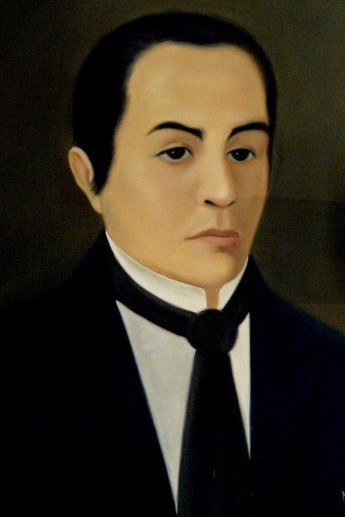

Supreme Director of Nicaragua Acting
- In office ?, 1839 – May 15, 1839
- Leader: Casto Fonseca
- Preceded by: José Núñez (First Transitional Government)
- Succeeded by: Patricio Rivas (Acting)
- In office July 27, 1839 – October 20, 1839.
- Preceded by: Patricio Rivas (Acting)
- Succeeded by: Hilario Ulloa (Acting)

Personal details
- Born: 2 September 1789 El Viejo, Captaincy General of Guatemala
- Died: unknown
- Party: Legitimist

Joaquín del Cossío (born in El Viejo on September 2, 1789) was a Nicaraguan politician, member of the Legitimist Party who served as acting Supreme Director of Nicaragua on two occasions, first alongside Evaristo Rocha until May 15, and again from July 27, to October 20, 1839.

José Núñez and Cossío were the most important figures in the Independence of Nicaragua, as they began the first and second transitional governments that lead to Nicaragua's independence.

== Biography ==
=== Independence of Central America ===
In 1824 he was a part of Governing Board of El Viejo presided over by Juan Bautista Salazar. Later that year, Colonel Juan Josê Salas, the leader of the ruling junta in León, appointed him governor of that city.

=== As Supreme Director ===
He later served as deputy Supreme Director under José Núñez, the first Supreme Director. Although, according to the constitution, the term of office of the Supreme Director lasted two years, on January 5, 1839, Núñez handed over power to Cossío, making him acting Supreme Director. Evaristo Rocha was to essentially take up the position after him but they ruled somewhat jointly until May 15. It is unknown when Cossío actually took office. On May 21, the legislature elected him as the new official Supreme Director. Like his predecessor, Cossío resigned before the official end of his term, handing over power to Hilario Ulloa.

==== Policies ====
By State Decree issued on August 27, 1839, he announced that the decision on the location of the Parliament, in accordance with the internal security and tranquility of the state, fell within the competence of the Supreme Directors. And by another State Decree, issued in León on September 2, 1839, the towns of San Fernando de Masaya, Santa Ana de Chinandega and El Viejo, rose to Villas.

He also signed a general amnesty by Decree of the Legislative Assembly of September 7, 1839.

Political offices
| Preceded by José Núñez (first transitional government) | Supreme Director of Nicaragua (acting alongside Rocha) (until may 15); 1839 | Succeeded by Patricio Rivas (acting) |

Political offices
| Preceded by Patricio Rivas (acting) | Supreme Director of Nicaragua (acting); 1839 | Succeeded by Hilario Ulloa (acting) |
