= Manuel Pérez (Nicaraguan politician) =

Nicaraguan politician

Manuel Pérez (1800 Granada – 1852) was a Nicaraguan Politician who served as the 3rd Supreme Director of Nicaragua from May 31, 1843 to November 4, 1844.

In 1843 Supreme Director Pablo Buitrago y Benavente, resigned and the Parliament appointed Juan de Dios Orozco as Acting Supreme Director, who served until the Parliament elected Pérez as the new Supreme Director of the State instead of the people, as the public elections failed and no candidate could achieve the required majority vote.

When President of El Salvador, Francisco Malespín invaded Nicaragua, Pérez sent the Nicaraguan troops gathering in Chinandega to Chichigalp, thus preventing military action. However, this support given to Malespín provoked parliamentary opposition, and so Pérez was removed from office on September 26, and his duties were replaced by Emiliano Madriz. However, Pérez did not resign voluntarily and continued to work until November 4.

Political offices
| Preceded by Juan de Dios Orozco (acting) | Supreme Director of Nicaragua; 1843 – 1844 | Succeeded by Emiliano Madriz (interim, in León); Blas Antonio Sáenz (provisional, in Masaya); Silvestre Selva (appointed by Malespín, in Masaya) |
