= Evaristo Rocha =

Nicaraguan politician

Evaristo Rocha was a conservative Nicaraguan politician who served as acting Supreme Director of Nicaragua between 5 April and 30 June 1839.

The first Nicaraguan Government was essentially a transitional government intended to prepare for the transition to a constitutional order. Although according to the constitution the term of office of the Supreme Director lasted two years, on 5 January 1839, the first Supreme Director, José Núñez transferred power to Joaquín del Cossío, making him acting Supreme Director, but Rocha essentially took that position. It is unknown when Cossío actually took office.

On 5 September 1849, Rocha welcomed the United States Ambassador to Nicaragua, Ephraim George Squier in El Viejo.

Political offices
Preceded by José Núñez (first transitional government)	Supreme Director of Nicaragua (acting alongside Cossío); 1839	Succeeded by Patricio Rivas (acting)
