= Quilaca =

- Village
- Location in Nicaragua
- Coordinates: 12.83227°N 87.47651°W
- Country: Nicaragua
- Department: Chinandega Department

Quilaca is a small village located in the Chinandega Department of Nicaragua. The village sits near the Gulf of Fonseca. The population of Quilaca has never been counted. Some nearby attractions include the Parroquia Santa Ana, Playa Las Penitas, and the Telica Volcano.
