= Commander-in-Chief of the Army (Nicaragua) =

- Comandante en Jefe del Ejército de Nicaragua
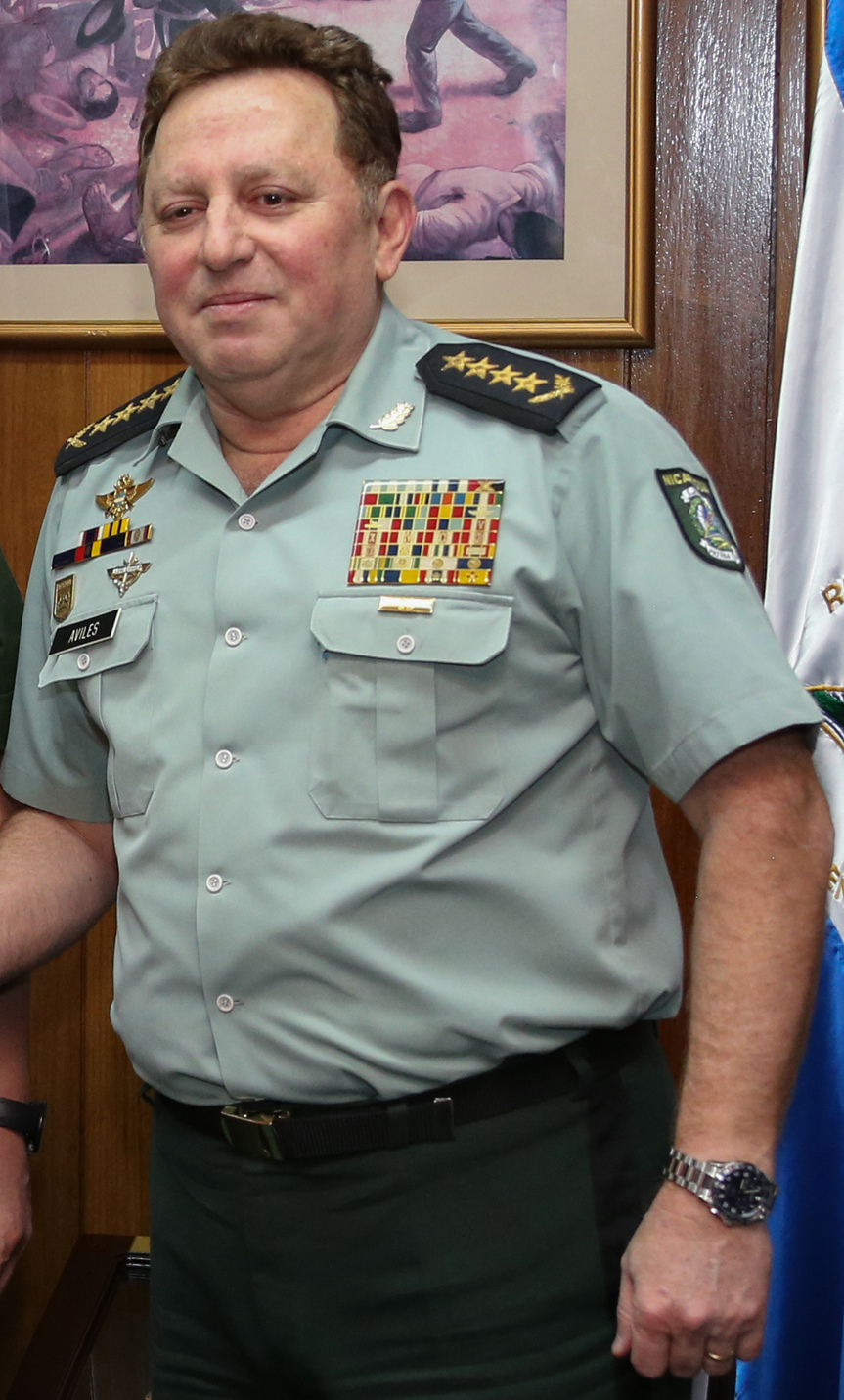
- Incumbent; Julio César Avilés Castillo since 21 February 2010
- Nicaraguan Armed Forces
- Reports to: Minister of Defence
- Precursor: Chief Director of the National Guard
- Formation: July 1979
- First holder: Humberto Ortega
- Website: Official website

The Commander-in-Chief of the Army (Spanish: Comandante en Jefe del Ejército de Nicaragua) is the professional head of the Armed Forces of the Republic of Nicaragua.

On 20 April 1823 José Anacleto Ordóñez would declare Nicaragua's independence in Granada and appointed himself General en Jefe del Ejército, Protector y Libertador de Granada, essentially establishing military absolutism in the state, with himself as the de facto military leader until he was deposed on 19 January 1825.

This military absolutism would be brought back after the assassination of Head of State José Zepeda on 25 January 1837, during the presidency of José Núñez, who appointed Bernardo Méndez de Figueroa as "General Commander of Arms".

== List of officeholders ==
=== Protector and Liberator of Granada ===
No.	Portrait	Name (born–died)	Term of office			Ref.
No.	Portrait	Name (born–died)	Took office	Left office	Time in office	Ref.
1	José Anacleto Ordóñez	General; José Anacleto Ordóñez (1778–1839)	20 April 1823	19 January 1825	1 year, 274 days	

=== General Commander of Arms ===
No.	Portrait	Name (born–died)	Term of office			Ref.
No.	Portrait	Name (born–died)	Took office	Left office	Time in office	Ref.
1	Bernardo Méndez de Figueroa	Colonel; Bernardo Méndez de Figueroa (1782–?)	1837	1839	1–2 years	
2	Casto Fonseca	Grand Marshal; Casto Fonseca (1800–1845)	1839	1845	5–6 years	
3	José Trinidad Muñoz	General; José Trinidad Muñoz (1790–1855)	1845	18 August 1855 †	9–10 years	

=== Commander-in-Chief ===
No.	Portrait	Name (born–died)	Term of office			Ref.
No.	Portrait	Name (born–died)	Took office	Left office	Time in office	Ref.
1	Humberto Ortega	Army general Humberto Ortega (1947–2024)	July 1979	21 February 1995	15 years, 7 months	
2	Joaquín Cuadra	Army general Joaquín Cuadra	21 February 1995	21 February 2000	5 years	
3	Javier Carrión McDonough	Army general Javier Carrión McDonough	21 February 2000	21 February 2005	5 years	
4	Moises Omar Halleslevens Acevedo	Army general Moises Omar Halleslevens Acevedo (born 1949)	21 February 2005	21 February 2010	5 years	
5	Julio Avilés Castillo	Army general Julio Avilés Castillo	21 February 2010	Incumbent	16 years, 198 days	
