= Silvestre Selva =

Nicaraguan politician (1777–1855)

Silvestre Selva Sacasa

Supreme Director of Nicaragua Appointed by Malespín, in Masaya
- In office 16 December 1844 – 20 January 1845
- Preceded by: Manuel Pérez; Emiliano Madriz (Interim, in León, after Pérez)
- Succeeded by: Blas Antonio Sáenz (Provisional, in Masaya)

Personal details
- Born: 31 December 1777 Granada, Captaincy General of Guatemala
- Died: 1855 (aged 77–78)
- Party: Legitimist

Silvestre Selva Sacasa (31 December 1777 – 1855) was a Nicaraguan politician of Basque origin, who, as a senator in the State Legislative Assembly, was appointed by the invading forces of Francisco Malespín to serve as provisional Supreme Director, served from 16 December 1844 to 20 January 1845 with headquarters in the city of Masaya.

== Biography ==
=== Background ===
Born on 31 December 1777 in Granada, he was the illegitimate son of Lieutenant General José Roberto Sacasa Marenco and Ubalda Rosalía Selva del Castillo Mayor. His father, José Roberto Sacasa Marenco, served as a councilman of the Granada City Council from 1774 to 1779, an appointment made by King Carlos IV and, on May 15, 1782, was appointed captain of the 1st Company of the Infantry Militia Battalion of Granada. Sacasa Marenco also held the office of mayor of Granada in 1785–1786 and later served as Deputy Minister of the Royal Hacienda de León until 1811, when he resumed his position as mayor of Granada.

Silvestre Selva was a maternal relative of Roberto Sacasa, the 10th President of Nicaragua.

=== Malespín's War ===
On 25 October 1844 the so-called Guerra de Malespín began when León was besieged by troops from El Salvador and Honduras under the command of General Francisco Malespín, a Salvadoran military ruler and a conservative convinced that he obtained the support of the Granadan legitimists.

José Francisco del Montenegro and Juan Ruiz were the ambassadors sent by Granada and Rivas to Malespín, with the result of the creation of a provisional government in charge of Senator Selva based in Masaya and without the consent of León, the seat of the government of Emiliano Madriz who as Supreme Director directed the defenses of the city, which was finally occupied with the subsequent looting of its churches.

==== Overthrow of Malespín ====
On 2 February 1845 Joaquín Eufrasio Guzmán, the Vice President of El Salvador, with support from much of San Salvador, declared himself President of El Salvador. Malespín, backed by Honduran forces, returned to El Salvador in an attempt to regain his presidency, thus ending the war in Nicaragua. Selva was able to escape from León, where he was stationed after Blas Antonio Sáenz and José León Sandoval formed a counter-government in Masaya, which on 20 January declared Sáenz as provisional Supreme Director, until Sandoval was elected on 4 April.

Preceded by Manuel Pérez; Emiliano Madriz (interim, in León, after Pérez)	Supreme Director of Nicaragua (appointed by Malespín, in Masaya); 1844 – 1845	Succeeded by Blas Antonio Sáenz (provisional, in Masaya)
