= Commander-in-Chief of the Army =

Commander-in-Chief of the Army may refer to:

- Commander-in-chief of the Argentine Army
- Commander-in-Chief of the British Indian Army
- Commander-in-Chief of the Chilean Army
- Commander-in-Chief of the German Wehrmacht
- Commander-in-Chief of the Indian Army
- Commander-in-Chief of the Kazakh Army
- Commander-in-Chief of Myanmar Army
- Commander-in-Chief of the Army (Nicaragua)
- Commander-in-chief of the Army (Nepal)
- Commander-in-Chief of the Pakistan Army
- Commander-in-Chief of the Russian Army
- Commander-in-Chief of the Royal Thai Army
