= Jacques Audiberti =

French writer and poet (1899–1965)

Jacques Séraphin Marie Audiberti (March 25, 1899 – July 10, 1965) was a French playwright, poet and novelist and exponent of the Theatre of the Absurd.

Audiberti was born in Antibes, France, the son of Louis Audiberti, a master mason, and his wife, Victorine. He began his writing career as a journalist, moving to Paris in 1925 to write for Le Journal and Le Petit Parisien. Later, he wrote more than 20 plays on the theme of conflicting good and evil.

He married Élisabeth-Cécile-Amélie Savane in 1926. They had two daughters, Jacqueline (born 1926) and Marie-Louise (born 1928). He died in Paris in 1965, aged 66, and is interred in the Cimetière de Pantin, Pantin, Ile-de-France Region, France.

== Biography ==
Jacques Audiberti was born on March 25, 1899, the only son of Louis Audiberti, a master mason in Antibes, and his wife, Victorine. From 1905 to 1914, he attended primary and secondary school in Antibes, which he had to interrupt for health reasons. He begins to publish poems and columns in the Réveil d'Antibes. Edmond Rostand, to whom he had sent some poems, sent him encouragement and an autographed photo, which Audiberti kept for a long time. He discovers cinema with wonder. From 1918 to 1924, he was a clerk at the Commercial Court where his father had been appointed judge. Audiberti moves to Paris. Recommended by a fellow student, Émile Condroyer, he joined Le Journal, which he left the following year for Le Petit Parisien, where he covered news in the Paris suburbs. Through Benjamin Péret, also a journalist at Le Petit Parisien, he came into contact with the Surrealism movement, without ever belonging to it. He was a frequent visitor to the National library. Two years later, he married a young schoolteacher from the West Indies, Élisabeth Cécile Amélie Savane (1899-1988), whose first names became the title of a poem published in 1936 and who became known as Amélie Audiberti[2], a translator of English. She was the first translator of George Orwell 1984 in 1950. They had two daughters: Jacqueline and Marie-Louise Audiberti.

In 1930, thanks to his father's financial support, Audiberti published his first collection of poems, L'Empire et la Trappe. Supported by Jean Paulhan, Audiberti contributed to various magazines and, in 1935, was appointed reporter for Le Petit Parisien. Among his acquaintances and friends were Jean Cassou, Valery Larbaud and Léon-Paul Fargue. In 1933, he began a correspondence with Jean Paulhan that would not be completed until 1965, a few weeks before his death. Race des hommes, a collection of poetry published by La NRF in 1937, won the Prix de poésie de l'Académie Mallarmé in 1938. On this occasion, Audiberti met Paul Valéry and Jean Cocteau. In 1939, Le Petit Parisien sent him to the Spanish border during the rout of the Republican army: "I'm living the Spanish Civil War. I vomit." Audiberti follows the exodus for the newspaper, then interrupts his collaboration when the paper comes under German control. Audiberti writes film reviews. He continues to write poetry and novels, while traveling: Aurillac, Toulouse, Val-d'Isère.

From 1941 to 1943, he worked for the newspaper Comœdia, for which he wrote numerous film reviews giving an insight into cinema under the Occupation. He befriended future filmmaker Jacques Baratier. He spends the end of the war in Antibes. There he translated the amorous episodes of La Jérusalem Délivrée under the title Les flèches d'Armide (1946, new edition 1993).

The Académie Française awarded him the Prix Jean-Reynaud in 1944.

From 1946 to 1952, he held a series of exhibitions of his gouaches, premiered his own plays, published novels and contributed to Lucie Faure fascicule in La Nef, entitled “L'Amour est à réinventer”, alongside Marcelle Auclair, Hervé Bazin, Émile Danoën and Roger Vailland, among others. He receives awards. He met Georges Vitaly, Suzanne Flon, Michel Piccoli, André Barsacq and others. With Italian writer Beniamino Joppolo and painter Camille Bryen, he developed “abhumanism” in 1952. The following year, François Truffaut convinced Audiberti to write articles for Cahiers du cinéma.

From 1954 to 1964, he published novels and enjoyed success in the theater. In 1962, the premiere of La Fourmi dans le corps at the Comédie-Française provoked a memorable battle between shocked subscribers and a more “informed” audience that made no secret of its enthusiastic support, while his friend Jacques Baratier adapted his novel La Poupée for the cinema. Audiberti contributed to the production, writing about it in an article published in Le Nouveau Candide, no. 78, in October.

In 1958, he was made an Officer of the Legion of Honour.

In 1964, Audiberti was awarded the Grand prix national des Lettres for his body of work, as well as the Prix des Critiques. From 1960 onwards, Marcel Maréchal, with his agreement and support, directed a number of his plays: L'Opéra du monde, Cavalier seul, La Poupée... Suffering from cancer, he underwent his first operation. He corresponds with François Mauriac.

Jacques Audiberti died in 1965, a few weeks before the publication of his novel Dimanche m'attend. His friend Claude Nougaro paid tribute to him that same year with his Chanson pour le maçon (Audiberti's father). He is buried in his in-laws' vault in the Parisian cemetery of Pantin (32nd division).

The town of Antibes pays tribute to him with a high school named after him. It created the Prix Audiberti in 1979.

In 2020, the Association des Amis de Jacques Audiberti created the “Prix Jeune Audiberti”, awarded following a writing competition reserved for young people under the age of 26.

== Works ==
=== Plays ===
- Le mal court (1947)
- L'effet Glapion (1959)
- Les Patients (1961)
- La Fourmi dans le corps (1962)
- Quoat-Quoat
- L'Ampélour
- Les femmes du bœuf

=== Poetry ===
- Des Tonnes de semence (1941)
- Toujours (1944)
- Rempart (1953)

=== Novels ===
- Le Maître de Milan (1950)
- Marie Dubois (1952)
- Les jardins et les fleuves (1954)
- Infanticide préconisé (1958)

=== Other ===
- La Poupée, a film scenario adapted from an earlier novel
- Dimanche m'attend, a diary published in (1965)
