= La Poupée (film) =

1962 film

- Film poster
- Directed by: Jacques Baratier
- Written by: Jacques Audiberti
- Produced by: Jacques Baratier; Claude Jaeger
- Starring: Zbigniew Cybulski
- Cinematography: Raoul Coutard
- Edited by: Léonide Azar
- Release date: 7 November 1962
- Running time: 95 minutes
- Countries: France; Italy
- Language: French

La Poupée ("The Doll") is a 1962 French-Italian science fiction film directed by Jacques Baratier. It was entered into the 12th Berlin International Film Festival. It was Baratier's final film. La Poupée is a surrealistic work, "part theater of the absurd, part musical with Greek chorus". Grand Guignol

In La Poupée, a rebel impersonates the leader of a fictional country, loosely modeled off Latin American dictators. His "wife" Marion (played by the crossdressing actor Sonne Teal) is in fact also a robot imposter, the Poupée.

== Cast ==
- Zbigniew Cybulski - Col. Prado Roth / The Rebel
- Sonne Teal - Marion / La Poupée
- Claudio Gora - Moren, the Banker
- Catherine Milinaire - Mirt
- Jean Aron - Prof. Palmas
- Sacha Pitoëff - Sayas
- Daniel Emilfork - Gant de Crin
- Jacques Dufilho - The Indian
- Gabriel Jabbour - Joachim
- Michel de Ré - Gervasio
- László Szabó - Pascuel
- Roger Karl - Terremoche
- Jean Galland - Gonziano
- Max Montavon - Scientist
