= MNCH =

MNCH can refer to:

- Chinandega Airport, Chinandega, Nicaragua, ICAO code MNCH
- Mancher Chatta railway station, Mancher Chatta, Pakistan, station code MNCH
- National Maternal, Neonatal & Child Health Program, a devolved program of the Pakistani Ministry of National Health Services, Regulation and Coordination
- University of Oregon Museum of Natural and Cultural History, Eugene, Oregon, United States
