= Cinco Pinos =

Cinco Pinos may refer to:

- San Juan de Cinco Pinos, colloquially known as Cinco Pinos, a town and municipality in Nicaragua
- Cinco Pinos (peak), a mountain in Sierra de Utiel, Spain
