= Hilario Ulloa =

Nicaraguan politician

Hilario Ulloa was a Nicaraguan politician who served as acting Supreme Director of Nicaragua from October 20 to November 7, 1839.

He married Rafaela Calvo. They lived in León and had a son, Manuel Ulloa y Calvo, who became Bishop of León on September 20, 1867.

Ulloa was a senator in the Legislative Assembly of the first Nicaraguan government, which was essentially a transitional government intended to prepare for the transition to a constitutional order. Although according to the constitution the term of office of the Supreme Director lasted two years, the second Supreme Director, Joaquín del Cossío, handed over power to Ulloa on October 20, 1839, making him Acting Supreme Director. When the transitional government ended and the first Supreme Director was elected in 1841, Ulloa completely retired from politics.

Political offices
Preceded by Joaquín del Cossío (acting)	Supreme Director of Nicaragua (acting); 1839	Succeeded by Tomás Valladares (acting)
