= Francisco Jiménez Rubio =

Nicaraguan politician

Franscisco Jiménez Rubio was a Nicaraguan Conservative politician. He served as acting Head of State in Nicaragua from 12 January 1838 – 13 March 1838 while it was a part of the Federal Republic of Central America. He oversaw the next election of Head of State and was succeeded by José Núñez.

Political offices
Preceded by José Núñez	Head of State of Nicaragua (acting); 1838	Succeeded by José Núñez
