= Benito Morales =

Nicaraguan politician and statesman

Head of State of Nicaragua
- In office December 1833 – 15 March 1834
- Preceded by: Dionisio de Herrera
- Succeeded by: José Núñez

Personal details
- Born: 1803 Matagalpa, Captaincy General of Guatemala, Viceroyalty of New Spain
- Died: 1889 (aged 85–86) León, Nicaragua
- Party: Legitimist

Benito Morales (1803–1889) was a conservative Nicaraguan politician and statesman who served as acting Head of State of Nicaragua from December 1833 to 15 March 1834.

== Family ==
Benito Morales married Adelaida Lacayo y Briones. One of his sons was Estanislao Morales is considered a hero in the Battle of San Jacinto. His other children lived in León.

He studied in the University of León.

=== Descendants ===
Children of Estanislao Morales were Dr. Estanislao Morales Morales and Marcelino Morales Morales (circa 1855-1920), the latter being the father of Beatriz Morales Otero (1885-1982), who She was the single mother of Julio Morales Orúe (1907-1978) and Adela Morales Orúe (June 1907 – December 2008), a son and daughter she had with Arístides Orúe Álvarez, originally from León. Cimodacea Morales Otero, daughter of Marcelino Morales Morales, married to General Ramon Tellez Salinas. Her daughter Haydee Tellez Morales, married to Victorino Miranda, parents of Jorge Miranda Tellez.

== Political career ==
=== In the Supreme Court of Justice ===
In 1830 Morales was elected Substitute Magistrate of the Supreme Court of Justice of Nicaragua. During May 1830, elections were held for the appointment of Second Head of State and Magistrates of the Superior Court of Justice, resulting in the following being elected:

- Gregorio Porras; Vice Chief
- Nicolás Buitrago; President of the Court
- Pedro Zeledón; Senior Judge
- Cándido Flores; Second Magistrate
- Cornelio Gutiérrez; Third magistrate
- Agustín Vijil; Prosecutor
- Juan J. Zavala, Pedro Oviedo and Benito Morales; Substitutes

=== As Head of State ===
After the Dionisio de Herrera left the government at the end of December 1833, Counselor Morales took over the Executive Branch temporarily, to end Herrera's constitutional term. The transfer of command took place on 15 March, as mentioned by Dr. José Núñez, in his message to the Legislative Assembly in November 1834. On 10 March the Representative Council appointed Núñez as Head of State of Nicaragua on an interim basis.

=== Later Political Endeavors ===
In 1866, when a discussion was taking place in the Senate and the Chamber of the Republic on the approval of the conduct of the Government of Nicaragua in the matter relating to General Gerardo Barrios, the opposition resolved to remove Ramón Alegría, substitute deputy for Matagalpa, from his seat, and appoint deputy Morales.

In 1880 Morales, appointed in congress, wanted to vote for Granadan politician Enrique Guzmán before Carlos Selva, another member of congress, accused Guzmán of assault.

In 1881 Morales was proposed as a pre-candidate for the vice-presidency, with Tomas Ayón as President, both from the western parts of the country.

=== War in Matagalpa ===
In 1881, when an Indian uprising took place in Matagalpa, Morales opposed the abuses of Prefect Gregorio Cuadra.

President Joaquín Zavala from the beginning attributed complicity to the Jesuits in the rebellion, despite the fact that he had no indication of evidence against them. In a letter that he addressed to Pedro Joaquín Chamorro Alfaro on April 3, 1881, four days after the events in Matagalpa transpired.

== Social Career and death ==
He was a member of the El Ateneo de León in 1880, and he was the head of the construction of the Cathedral of Matagalpa. He headed the list of donors for the continued construction of the Matagalpa Parish Church in 1884, after the expulsion of the Jesuits.

Morales died in León in 1889.

Political offices
| Preceded by Dionisio de Herrera | Head of State of Nicaragua (acting); 1833 – 1834 | Succeeded by José Núñez (acting) |
