= Hermógenes L. Mora =

Nicaraguan poet and writer

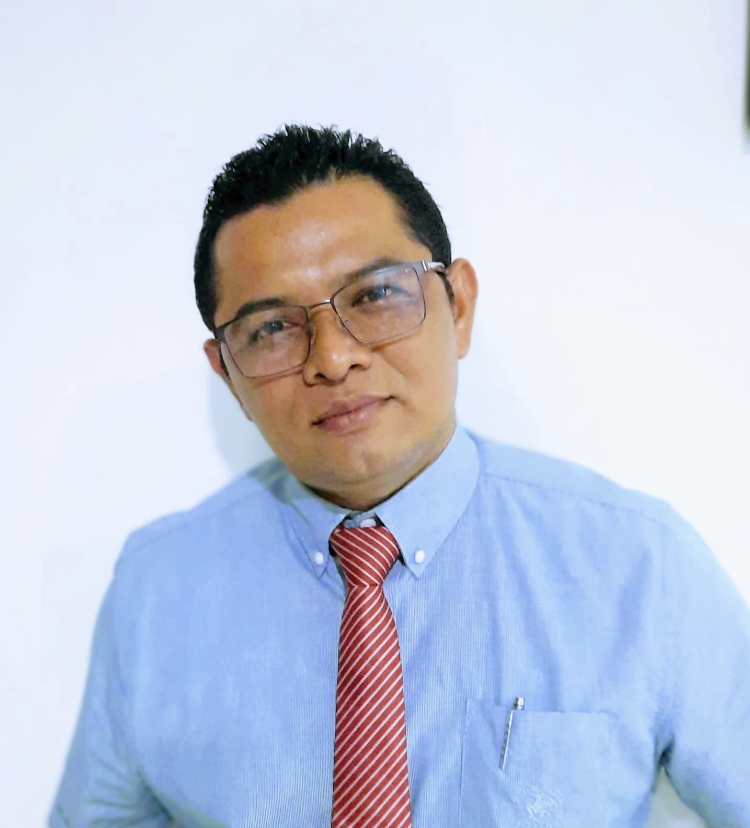
- Born: Hermógenes Leonel Guevara Mora; 19 April 1979; Chinandega, Nicaragua
- Occupations: poet, writer
- Years active: 2019 -
- Parents: Saturnino Sergio Guevara (father); Marta Stella Mora Figueroa (mother)

Hermógenes Leonel Guevara Mora, better known as Hermógenes L. Mora (born 19 April 1979 in Chinandega) is a Nicaraguan poet and writer.

== Biography ==
Mora has read books regularly since his childhood. He has always been an admirer of Rubén Darío.

He has lived in El Viejo, León, and later San José, Costa Rica and Panama City, Panama.

In his poetry and stories, he crudely describes the reality faced by his people.

== Selected works ==
- Poemas a los héroes de la revolución (2023)
- Tortura psicológica, crónica de un inmigrante (2022)
- Entre dos mundos (2021)
- Seis relatos para una tarde y una taza de café (2021) ISBN 978-9962136859
- Tabúes y realidades (utopías en versos) (2020) ISBN 978-9962135418
- Un plan para escapar (2019) ISBN 978-9962-12-961-5
