= Chinandega Airport =

Chinandega Airport Germán Pomares Ordoñez Airport
- IATA: none; ICAO: MNCH

Summary
- Airport type: Public
- Owner/Operator: INAC
- Serves: Chinandega
- Elevation AMSL: 246 ft / 75 m
- Coordinates: 12°38′22″N 87°08′15″W

Map
- Location in Nicaragua

Runways
Direction	Length		Surface
Direction	m	ft	Surface
10/28	757	2,484	Asphalt
- Google Maps GCM SkyVector

Chinandega Airport (Spanish: Pista Aérea Germán Pomares Ordoñez) (ICAO: MNCH) is an airport serving Chinandega, the capital of the Chinandega Department of Nicaragua. The airport is on the northwest edge of the city.

The Managua VOR-DME (Ident: MGA) is located 64.7 nautical miles (120 km) southeast of the airport.

== History ==
In the early 1980s, the airstrip was used primarily by light aircraft for aerial fumigation. The Chinandega Airport, also known as the El Picacho Airport, was renovated in 2010 by the Nicaraguan Civil Aeronautics Authority (INAC).

== See also ==
- List of airports in Nicaragua
- Transport in Nicaragua
