= Reynaldo Aguado Montealegre =

Nicaraguan human rights activist

Reynaldo Tadeo Aguado Montealegre (28 October 1960, Chinandega) is the President of the International Society for Human Rights in Nicaragua. (Sociedad Internacional para los Derechos Humanos, SID-HH-Nicaragua). He is a former FSLN political prisoner incarcerated in the prison "Zona Franca" in 1986 after being found guilty of spying for the United States.
