= San Juan de Cinco Pinos =

Cinco Pinos
- Municipality
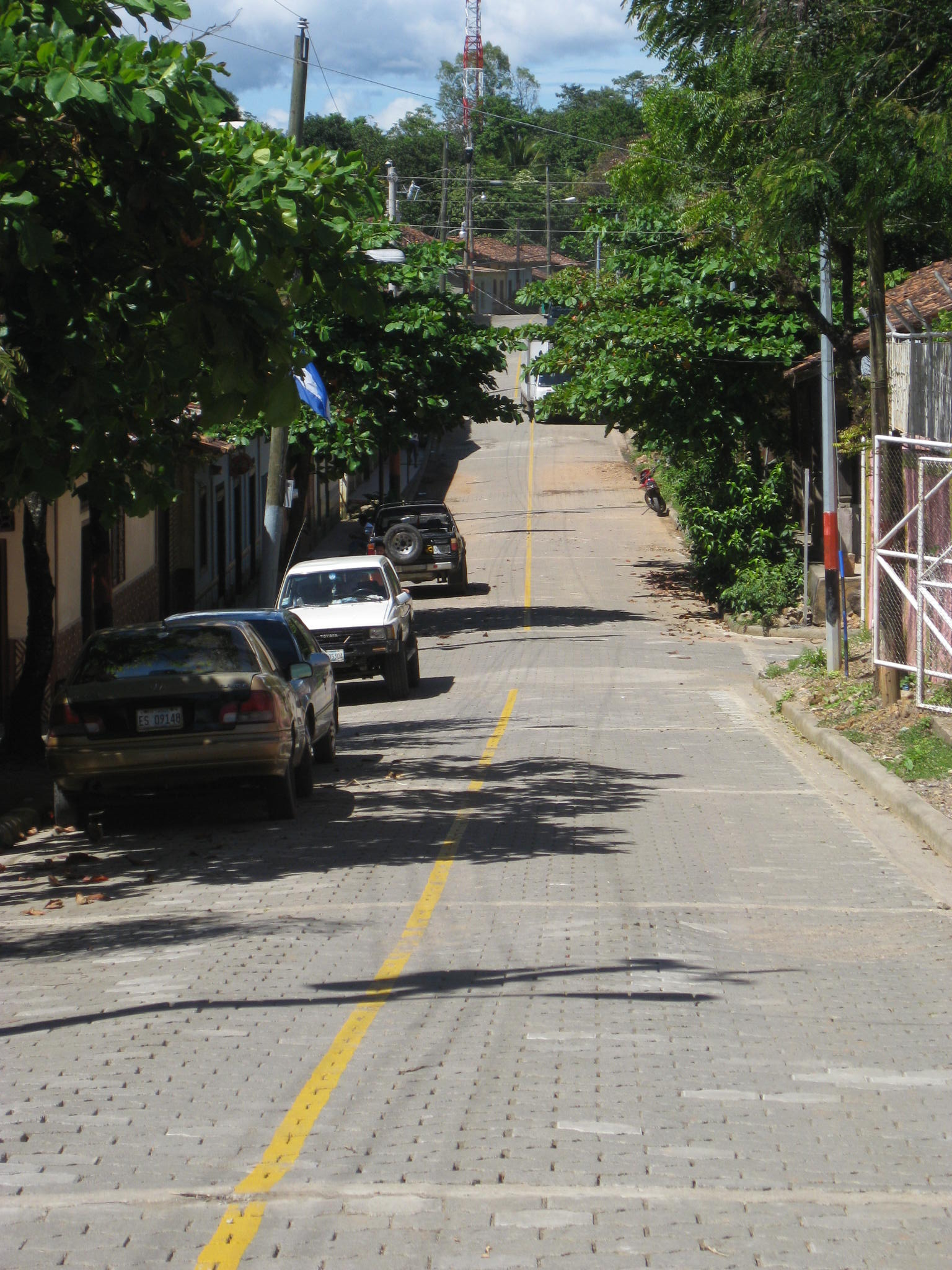
- Street in Cinco Pinos

- Location in Nicaragua
- Coordinates: 13°13′N 86°55′W
- Country: Nicaragua
- Department: Chinandega Department

Area
  - Municipality: 23 sq mi (60 km^{2})

Population (2005)
  - Municipality: 6,781
  - Density: 290/sq mi (110/km^{2})
  - Urban: 5,894

San Juan de Cinco Pinos, colloquially known as Cinco Pinos, is a town and a municipality in the north of the Chinandega Department in Nicaragua, situated between San Pedro del Norte and Santo Tomás del Norte.

== History ==
The town was founded in 1879 as a result of the migration of residents from neighboring Honduras. Prior to that time, there was a small village called Villa Salvadorita, 2 km west of the current location of Cinco Pinos. In the early 1950s, with the development of cotton cultivation, the town was renamed to San Juan de Cinco Pinos.

The festivities of the patron saint of Cinco Pinos is held in honor of San Caralampio. The event takes place every year from February 9 to 11, with the traditional Toro Huaco dance and chichero music.

== Geography ==
The population of San Juan de Cinco Pinos is mainly rural. Only 21% lives in the town of Cinco Pinos and the rest are scattered around the 14 comarcas of the municipality.

- El Carrizal
- El Cerro
- El Espino
- El Jícaro
- El Pavón
- El Zacatón
- La Honda
- La Montaña
- Las Lajitas
- Las Pozas
- Los Araditos
- Santa Fe
- Villa Camilo
- Villa Francia
