= Casto Fonseca =

Nicaraguan military general and politician

Grand marshal Casto Fonseca

General Commander of Arms Nicaragua
- In office 6 April 1839 – 20 January 1845
- Preceded by: Bernardo Méndez de Figueroa
- Succeeded by: José Trinidad Muñoz

Personal details
- Born: c. 1800; León, Captaincy General of Guatemala
- Died: 24 January 1845 (aged 44–45); León, Nicaragua

Military service
- Allegiance: Nicaragua (1834–1845)
- Rank: Colonel (1834–1837); Grand Marshal (1839–1844)
- Commands: Army of Nicaragua (1839–1845)

Casto Fonseca (c. 1800 – 24 January 1845) was a Nicaraguan military figure who served as the de facto military leader of Nicaragua from 6 April 1839 to 20 January 1845, preceded by Bernardo Méndez de Figueroa and succeeded by José Trinidad Muñoz.

Fonseca was a graduate in medicine and only had one son, Marcos Fonseca.

== Rise to power ==
=== Assassination of José Zepeda ===
On 25 January 1837 Fonseca and Méndez took the León barracks and took a man named Braulio Mendiola out of jail and commissioned him to arrest the head of state, José Zepeda, and officials of his government. Zepeda and some of his officials were killed, and later buried in the Cemetery of Guadalupe. After his death, José Núñez assumed leadership. Núñez did not arrest the rebels, but rather appeased Méndez and appointed him General Commander of Arms, but Mendiola was captured and executed.

=== Reestablishment of Military Absolutism ===
Méndez reestablished the military absolutism initiated by José Anacleto Ordóñez in 1823, even against the will of Núñez, who was at that point powerless to oppose. After Méndez's fall from power in 1839, Militarism would continue under Fonseca, who promoted himself to the highest rank of "Grand Marshal" and wore operetta garb.

He became the true arbiter of political life in Nicaragua, with the ability to even influence the elections of the supreme authorities of the State, which aroused the uncalmed traditional passionate hatreds.

== Malespín's War ==
Fonseca supported the parliamentary election of liberal Manuel Pérez as Supreme Director after public elections failed, and this concerned the conservative politicians mainly based in Granada. Under Pérez, Managua's council decided to move the jurisdiction policy of Granada towards the jurisdiction policy of León and Granadans feared that Managua would be controlled militarily by Fonseca, and that the leaders of Leonese liberalism would be a threat to them.

=== Beginning of the War ===
On 25 October 1844, Salvadoran President Francisco Malespín, handed over the presidency to his Vice President, Joaquín Eufrasio Guzmán, and began leading his troops towards Nicaragua with support from the Honduran Government under Francisco Ferrera. Pérez, lacking the prestige the situation required, resigned, and on 26 September 1844 Emiliano Madriz, based in León, was appointed interim Supreme Director. On 27 November the combined Armies of El Salvador and Honduras, known as the "Ejército Protector de la Paz" under the supreme command of Malespín, with José Santos Guardiola as second and José Trinidad Muñoz as third in command, are confronted by the few troops of Fonseca, concentrated in León, which is besieged. The first battles were disastrous for the attackers and the Hondurans began to withdraw, but Malespín convinced them to stay in combat, not before Manuel Quijano y García and 64 dragoons had already deserted León.

The Granadans offered their support to Fonseca under a pact to improve the regime; but he replied that the government did not agree with rebels, that the Granadans should proceed as they saw fit, and that he reserved giving them the punishment they deserved. Initially, about 400 Matagalpa archers enlisted in the defense of León against the invading army, but due to the mistreatment they received from Fonseca and the breaking of the liberal-conservative alliance, they joined the occupying forces.

=== Leon's Site ===
Some officers believed that Fonseca, though brave, was not competent enough to make a proper defense. José María Valle, "El Chelon", suggested that Fonseca hand over command to José Trinidad Cabañas. Fonseca considered the suggestion an insult, and consequently Valle withdrew and Cabañas became an object of suspicion for Fonseca. Due to Fonseca's ineptitude and intransigence, Madriz commanded the defenses of León.. The defenses of Sutiava was entrusted to Gerardo Barrios, who organized it for the resistance against the siege led by Malespín.

After a shipment of weapons was seized in the port of El Realejo, allowing the advance towards León, on 24 January Malespín entered the long-besieged city, and his troops looted and massacred it.

== Death and legacy ==
When Malespín entered León he executed many prominent citizens of Leonese society at the time, including Minister General Crescencio Navas and Supreme Director Emiliano Madriz. Barrios and Cabañas were able to escape and return to El Salvador, but Fonseca remained, and a drunk Malespín watched his execution.

He is considered by many as "Nicaragua's most tyrannical leader", and is viewed in that light.

Political offices
Preceded by Bernardo Méndez de Figueroa	General Commander of Arms; 1839 – 1845	Succeeded by José Trinidad Muñoz
