= Coronado Chávez =

President of Honduras

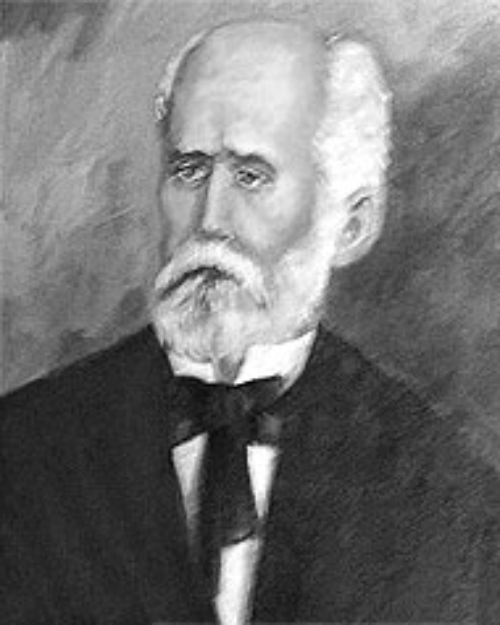

President of Honduras
- In office 8 January 1845 – 1 January 1847

Personal details
- Born: 8 November 1807
- Died: 22 June 1881 (aged 73) Asunción, Paraguay
- Party: Authentic Radical Liberal Party
- Spouse: Emilia Victoria Alfaro
- Children: 4

Coronado Chávez (8 November 1807 – 22 June 1881) was President of Honduras from 8 January 1845 to 1 January 1847. He was appointed by Francisco Ferrera as Vice President of Honduras from 1841 to 1843, and for the week prior to his taking office he had been a member of the council of ministers that was running Honduras along with Casto Alvarado. He was succeeded by Juan Lindo.

== Early life ==
Coronado Chávez was born to María Mercedes Chavez in 1807. He was a carpenter by trade. He would return to this job after an exile in El Salvador with Ferrera. He died in 1881 at the age of 73.

== Career ==
Chávez and Santos Guardiola, Francisco Ferrera, and Felipe Jáuregui formed a "clique" and operated in each other's interests. He worked in politics as Minister of Finance and both Minister of Exterior and Minister of War in 1843. In 1846, after Malespín's War, he took the title of Padre Conscripto, after the Roman title Pater Patriae. For this, he was ridiculed by some.

=== Presidency ===
His presidency began on 8 January 1845 after Francisco Ferrera's second term ended, being elected by the legislature. In that vote, he ran against José Santos Guardiola. Honduras' Constitution did not allow for a third term. However, Chávez is said to have acted as the puppet of Ferrera, who remained the effective leader. He defended himself, saying "not a single instance could be cited in which he [sic] allowed himself to be dictated to by any military leader or had acted subject to any such leader's will or caprice."

As president, he encouraged the growing of coffee and hat manufacturing. He exempted military veterans from paying their first fruits and tithes. He created the Literary Society of Honduras in 1846, which became the state university in 1850 under Juan Lindo. It was also renamed the Literary Academy of Tegucigalpa.

== See also ==
- List of presidents of Honduras
