= Emiliano Madriz =

Nicaraguan lawyer and politician

Supreme Director of Nicaragua Interim, in León
- In office 26 September 1844 – 24 January 1845
- Leader: Casto Fonseca
- Preceded by: Manuel Pérez
- Succeeded by: Blas Antonio Sáenz (Acting, Provisional in Masaya); Silvestre Selva (Appointed by Malespín, in Masaya)

Personal details
- Born: c. 1800 León, Captaincy General of Guatemala
- Died: 24 January 1845 León, Nicaragua
- Party: Democratic

Emiliano Madriz (c. 1800 – 24 January 1845) was a liberal Nicaraguan lawyer and politician who served as acting Supreme Director of Nicaragua from 26 September to 26 December 1844, and as the interim Supreme Director in León until 24 January 1845.

== Malespín's War ==
On 25 October 1844, Salvadoran President Francisco Malespín, handed over the presidency to his vice president, Joaquín Eufrasio Guzmán, and began leading his troops towards Nicaragua, with support from the Honduras.

The then Supreme Director, Manuel Pérez, avoided military action, and this support given to Malespín provoked parliamentary opposition, so he was removed from office on September 26, and his duties were replaced by Madriz, a member of the Legislative Assembly based in León.

=== Selva's Government in Masaya ===
The differences between the Nicaraguans surfaced and the conservatives from Granada abandoned the liberals in León and on 8 December they sought support from the invading leader. Thus, Granada sided with Malespin, followed by Rivas.

The Granadans moved the Legislative Assembly to Masaya, where on December 16, 1844, Silvestre Selva, a senator of the Legislative Assembly, was appointed Supreme Director, without the consent of León under siege.

=== Death ===
Some officers believed that Casto Fonseca, the commander of the defenses, though brave, was not competent enough to make a proper defense. José María Valle, "El Chelon", suggested that Fonseca hand over command to José Trinidad Cabañas, but Fonseca considered the suggestion an insult, and consequently Valle withdrew. Faced with Fonseca's ineptitude and intransigence, Madriz commanded the defenses of León, which had to withstand 89 days of siege. The defense of Sutiava was entrusted to Gerardo Barrios, who organized it for the resistance against the siege led by Malespín.

However, a shipment of weapons was seized allowing the advance through Sutiava towards León, and on 24 January 1845 they entered the city, massacring and looting it. And on the same date, Madriz was executed by firing squad under the direct order of Malespín.

Political offices
Preceded by Manuel Pérez	Supreme Director of Nicaragua (interim, in León); 1844 – 1845	Succeeded by Blas Antonio Sáenz (provisional, in Masaya); Silvestre Selva (appointed by Malespín, in Masaya)
