= Posoltega, Nicaragua =

Posoltega
- Municipality
- Location in Nicaragua
- Coordinates: 12°32′35″N 86°58′44″W
- Country: Nicaragua
- Department: Chinandega

Area
  - Municipality: 58 sq mi (149 km^{2})

Population (2005)
  - Municipality: 16,771
  - Density: 292/sq mi (113/km^{2})
  - Urban: 5,718

Posoltega (Spanish pronunciation: [posolˈteɣa]) is a municipality in the Chinandega department of Nicaragua.

The town and surrounding area suffered severe damage from Hurricane Mitch in 1998.

== International relations ==
=== Twin towns – Sister cities ===
Posoltega is twinned with:

- (United States) Bloomington, Indiana
