= Bernardo Méndez de Figueroa =

Nicaraguan military general (fl. 19th c.)

General Commander of Arms Nicaragua
- In office 26 January 1837 – 6 April 1839
- Preceded by: position created
- Succeeded by: Casto Fonseca

Personal details
- Born: 1782 León, Captaincy General of Guatemala
- Died: May 1839 (aged 56–57) San Juan del Norte, Mosquito Coast/Nicaragua
- Spouse: Tomasa Díaz y Cabeza
- Children: María Méndez Díaz de Figueroa
- Nickname: El Pavo

Military service
- Allegiance: Nicaragua (1823–1839)
- Rank: Colonel (1823–1839)
- Commands: Army of Nicaragua (1837–1839)
- Battles/wars: Battle of Espíritu Santo (1839)

Bernardo Méndez de Figueroa (1782 – May 1839) nicknamed "El Pavo" was a Nicaraguan military figure most notable for reestablishing military absolutism in Nicaragua in 1837 during the presidency of José Núñez.

He fell from power in April 1839 after he lost the Battle of Espíritu Santo and his position was taken by Casto Fonseca, who ruled until his death in 1845, and was replaced by José Trinidad Muñoz. Nicaragua would be run militarily for 18 years until Muñoz' death during the Filibuster War.

== Assassination of Jose Zepeda ==
On 25 January 1837 Méndez and Fonseca took the León barracks and a man named Braulio Mendiola out of jail. They instructed him to arrest the Head of State, José Zepeda, Colonel Román Valladares, Deputy Pascual Rivas and Captain Evaristo Berríos.

Zepeda and Colonel Balladares were killed and later buried in the Cemetery of Guadalupe. Deputy Head of State, José Núñez, assumed leadershipto finish Zepeda's term, which had two years left. Núñez did not arrest the rebels, but rather appeased Méndez and on 26 January appointed him General Commander of Arms, but Braulio Mendiola was executed.

== War with El Salvador ==
After the breaking of the Federal Pact in 1838, Honduras and Nicaragua declared war on El Salvador, where the federal government was located. In January 1839 Méndez, commanding a small Nicaraguan army, seized San Miguel and began marching towards San Salvador, achieving victory in Llanos del Jicaral, occupying San Vicente and advancing on Cojutepeque.

=== Imprisonment and Death ===
The Salvadoran army under the command of Francisco Morazán defeated the Nicaraguan army at the hacienda Espíritu Santo on 6 April 1839, returning Méndez to León where he was removed from office, replaced by Casto Fonseca, and imprisoned in San Juan del Norte under the responsibility of the Political Chief of Granada, Narciso Espinosa. Espinosa released Méndez and allowed him to live in a private house where he died shortly after, possibly in May 1839.

Political offices
Preceded by Position Created (Cleto Ordóñez in 1823)	General Commander of Arms; 1837 – 1839	Succeeded by Casto Fonseca
