= Puerto Morazán =

- Municipality
- Location in Nicaragua
- Coordinates: 12°57′N 87°11′W
- Country: Nicaragua
- Department: Chinandega

Population (2005)
  - Municipality: 13,328
  - Urban: 5,949

Puerto Morazán (Spanish pronunciation: [ˈpweɾto moɾaˈsan]) is a municipality in the Chinandega department of Nicaragua.

== International relations ==
=== Twin towns – sister cities ===
Puerto Morazán is twinned with:

- (England) Bristol, United Kingdom
