= El Viejo =

- Municipality
- Location in Nicaragua
- Coordinates: 12°40′N 87°10′W
- Country: Nicaragua
- Department: Chinandega

Government
  - Mayor: Maria Rodas Guevara (FSLN)

Area
  - Municipality: 492 sq mi (1,275 km^{2})

Population (2022 estimate)
  - Municipality: 91,446
  - Density: 185.8/sq mi (71.72/km^{2})
  - Urban: 52,840

El Viejo is a city and a municipality in the Chinandega department of Nicaragua.

== Overview ==
El Viejo is a small city near the city of Chinandega, noted for its particular gastronomic specialties, which include rosquillas (a type of doughnut), cajetas (a type of dulce de leche), bollitos de leche (a kind of scone), and a fruit particular to the region called the toncua, which is related to the papaya and is eaten with honey.

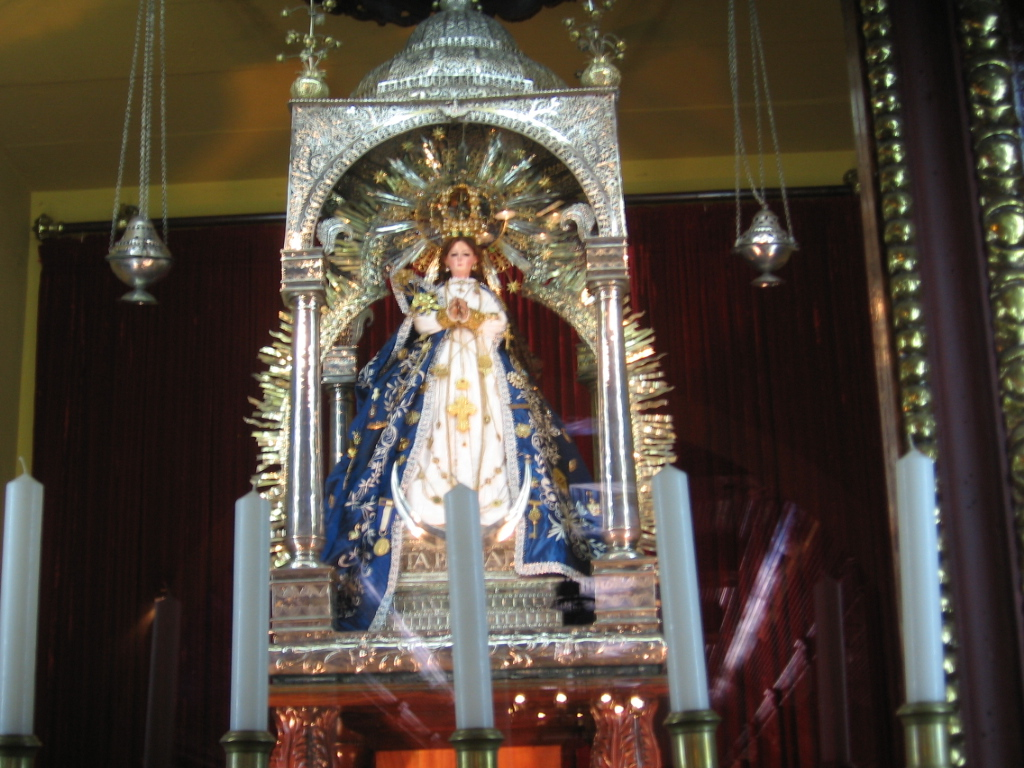
Virgen del Trono, El Viejo, Chinandega

El Viejo is also the site of a colonial-era church, the Basilica of the Immaculate Conception of Mary in El Viejo (Basílica Inmaculada Concepción de María en El Viejo), built in the 17th century. The image was crowned by the Pope in May 1989 via decree from December 1988. The church was elevated to the status of national religious sanctuary on 8 October 1995, and was declared a minor basilica on February 7, 1996, by Pope John Paul II, during his second visit to Nicaragua.

The basilica possesses a baptismal font dating from 1560, and also possesses a little statue of the Virgin Mary. Tradition states that Fray Pedro de Zepeda y Ahumada, brother of Teresa of Avila, traveling to El Realejo with the image, was forced to go to El Viejo due to a storm. The people of El Viejo were so taken by it that they wished for the image to stay in their town. However, Zepeda y Ahumada set off once more for El Realejo, but a second storm forced him back to El Viejo. Thus, he decided that this was a sign of divine intervention and left the image in El Viejo.

On December 6 of every year, the silver that is part of the little statue is washed before congregants in a ceremony called the lavado de la plata.

The city is twinned with Norwich in the United Kingdom.

== Notable people ==
- Joaquín del Cossío, Supreme Director of the State of Nicaragua
- Hermógenes L. Mora (1979 -), poet and author
- Vicente Padilla (1977 -), Major Baseball League player
- Roberto Sacasa (1840–1896), President of Nicaragua
