= José Zepeda =

Nicaraguan colonel and politician

Head of State of Nicaragua
- In office 23 April 1835 – 25 January 1837
- Preceded by: José Núñez
- Succeeded by: José Núñez

Personal details
- Born: 1784 León, Nicaragua, Captaincy General of Guatemala, Spanish Empire
- Died: 25 January 1837 (aged 52–53) León, Nicaragua
- Party: Liberal Federalist

José Zepeda (1784 – 24 January 1837) was a liberal Nicaraguan colonel and politician who served as Head of State of Nicaragua from 23 April 1835 until he was assassinated on 25 January 1837.

== Military career ==
He reached the rank of Colonel in the unionist army of General Francisco Morazán and participated in military actions such as the Battle of La Trinidad (1827), Battle of El Gualcho (1828), Battle of Las Charcas (1829), the Battle of Olancho and Las Vueltas del Ocote (1830).

== As Head of State ==
On 21 February 1835, the Legislative Assembly declared him elected as Head of State. He took office on 23 April of that year, along with Vice Chief José Núñez.

Under his administration, one of the most positive in the history of his country, reforms were carried out such as the establishment of the jury; The Court of Accounts was created, criminal proceedings were regulated and a good Penal Code was legislated. In addition, he organized the Supreme Court of Justice and prohibited the use of firearms.

He was also interested in instruction and education, regarding the clergy, he indicated that its members, to be ordained, had to have completed university studies; he reestablished the universities of León and Granada, regulated teaching in all branches and opened new schools. Along with these legislative actions, he founded an official newspaper, El Telégrafo Nicaragüense and the town of Rivas received the title of city.

Due to an anti-constitutionalist rebellion in 1834, a great reform of the federal Constitution was planned to take place in 1835, which was only agreed upon by Costa Rica and Nicaragua and consequently did not take effect.

=== Assassination ===
On 25 January 1837 Casto Fonseca, a graduate in medicine, and Colonel Bernardo Méndez de Figueroa "El Pavo", a man only notable for his fondness for gambling, stormed the León barracks and took a man named Braulio Mendiola out of jail, who was given a large escort by the assailants with orders to arrest Zepeda, Colonel Román Valladares, Deputy Pascual Rivas and Captain Evaristo Berríos.

Zepeda and Colonel Valladares, were killed and later buried in the Cemetery of Guadalupe. Vice Chief Núñez assumed the leadership of the State to finish his term, which had two years left to finish. Núñez did not arrest the rebels, but rather appeased Méndez and appointed him General Commander of Arms, but Mendiola was captured and executed for the killings.

Political offices
Preceded by José Núñez (acting)	Head of State of Nicaragua; 1835–1837	Succeeded by José Núñez
