= Jacques Baratier =

French film director

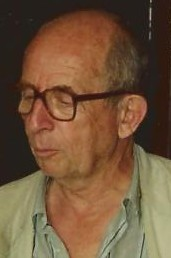
- Born: 8 March 1918; Montpellier, France
- Died: 27 November 2009 (aged 91); Antony, France
- Occupations: Film director Screenwriter
- Years active: 1948–2009

Jacques Baratier (8 March 1918 – 27 November 2009) was a French film director and screenwriter. He directed 21 films. His film Goha won the Jury Prize at the 1958 Cannes Film Festival. His 1962 film La poupée was entered for the 12th Berlin International Film Festival.

Goha was also shown as part of the Cannes Classics section of the 2013 Cannes Film Festival.

== Filmography ==
- Les Filles du soleil (1948)
- Désordre (1949)
- La Cité du midi (1951)
- La vie du vide (1952)
- Le Métier de danseur (1953)
- Histoire du palais idéal (1954)
- Paris la nuit (1955)
- Goha (1958)
- La Poupée (1962)
- Dragées au poivre (1963)
- Eves futures (1964)
- The Duke's Gold (1965)
- Voilà l'ordre (1966)
- Le Désordre à vingt ans (1967)
- Piège (1968)
- Les Indiens (1969)
- La Ville-bidon (1973)
- Vous intéressez-vous à la chose? (1974)
- Opération séduction (1975)
- L'Araignée de satin (1984)
- Rien, voilà l'ordre (2003)
