= Chichigalpa =

Chichigalpa Chichigalpan (nahuat)
- Municipality
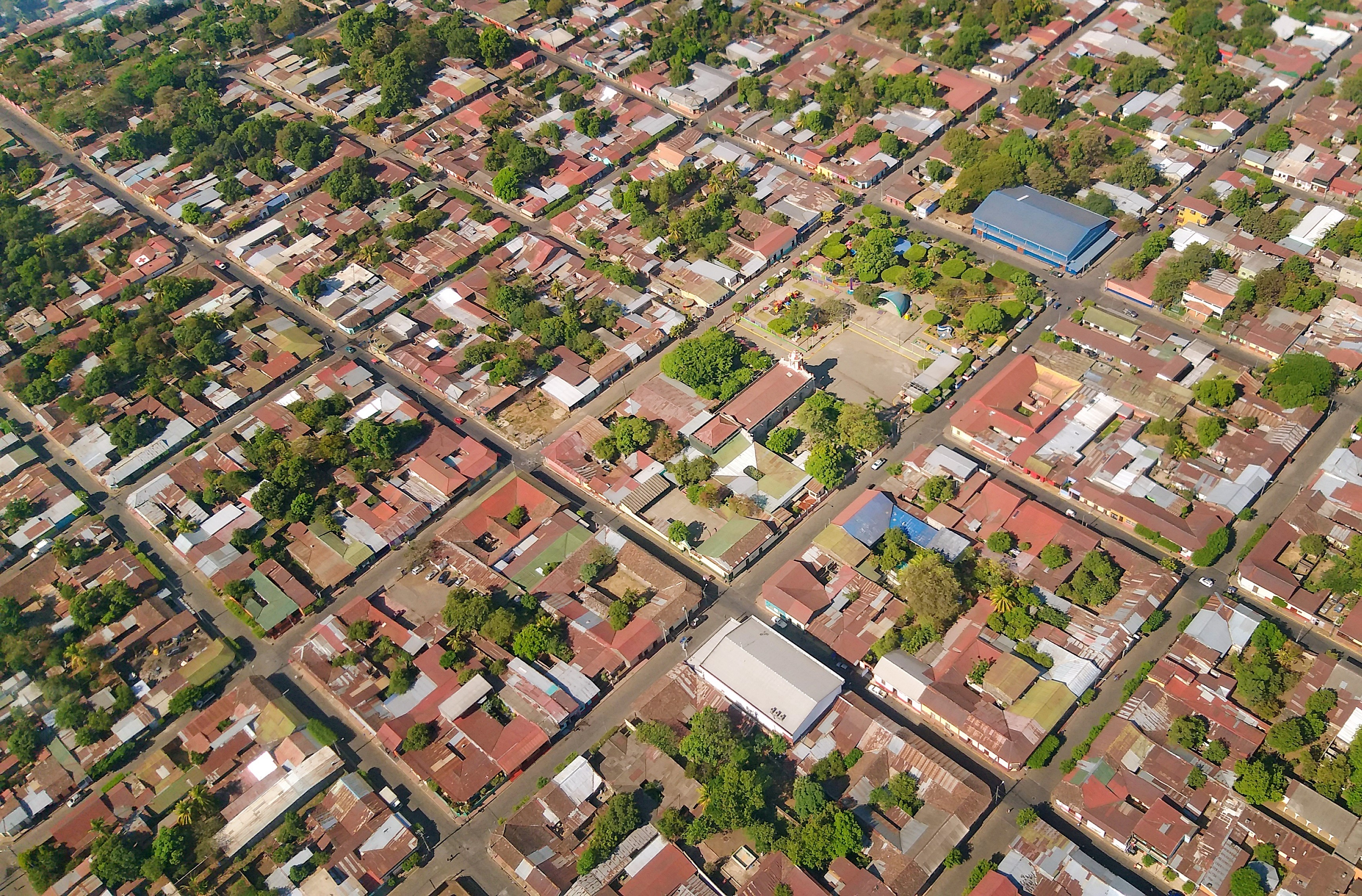
- Aerial view of Chichigalpa.

- Location in Nicaragua
- Coordinates: 12°34′N 87°02′W
- Country: Nicaragua
- Department: Chinandega Department
- Founded: 1839

Government
  - Mayor: Víctor Manuel Sevilla

Area
  - Municipality: 86 sq mi (223 km^{2})
  - Urban: 1.4 sq mi (3.5 km^{2})

Population (2022 estimate)
  - Municipality: 53,837
  - Density: 625/sq mi (241/km^{2})
  - Urban: 43,965
  - Urban density: 33,000/sq mi (13,000/km^{2})

Chichigalpa (Spanish pronunciation: [ˈtʃitʃiˈɣalpa]) o Chichicapan (nahuat) is a town and municipality in the Chinandega Department of Nicaragua.

== History ==
=== Pre-Columbian ===
It is presumed that Chichigalpa's first inhabitants arrived from the north. While their civilizations were not as advanced as those of the Aztecs and the Incans, they arrived at Chichigalpa due to a forced migration instituted by the Aztecs on weaker tribes. Of Toltec origin, the native people of Chichigalpa were presumed to be part of the Kingdom (Monexicado) of Chinandega and Tezoatega hence its name in nahuat nawat.

Initially, it was presumed that the town's name was linked to the nahuat term "chichiwal," which means breast, due to the volcano's shape resembling a breast. However, upon analyzing the town's linguistics, it became apparent that Chichigalpa was derived from the beautiful Chichigalpa river that flows through the city. In pre-colonial times, the river was utilized for washing clothes, bathing, and other purposes, which often made the water appear murky or "chichic" (meaning fermented or sour) due to the soap's cloudiness. "The fermented river" or "Chichicapan" gave the city its name.

=== Colonial Period ===
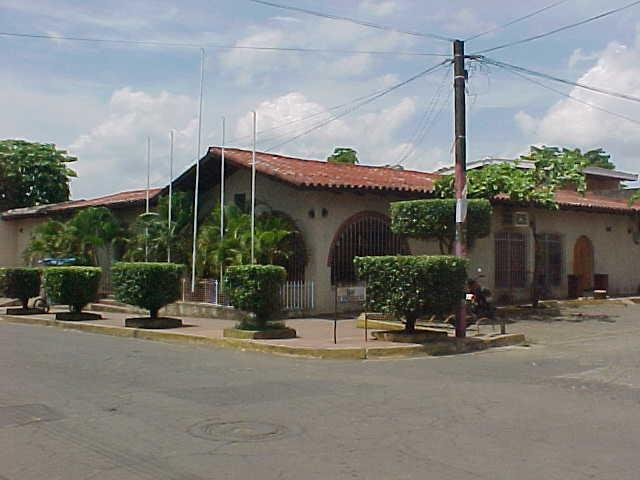
Town hall of Chichigalpa.

== Geography ==
=== Area ===
The municipality covers an area of 223 km^{2}, but only about 3.5 km^{2} make up the center of the municipality and its nearby surroundings. Chichigalpa is connected to the city of Chinandega by a paved road (15 km). The municipality connects to the Nicaraguan capital, Managua, through the Pan-American Highway. Chichigalpa forms part of the Western department of Chinandega. It is bordered to the north by the Cordillera Los Maribios (a mountain range), to the south by León, to the east by Posoltega, and to the west by the municipalities of El Realejo and Chinandega.

=== Climate ===
Chichigalpa is situated in tropical wet and dry climate (Köppen climate classification: Aw). The dry season last from November to April while the wet season extends from May to October. The average annual precipitation is of 1742 mm (68.58 in). Temperatures are usually the highest in the month of April. The average temperature is 30 °C (89 °F). Relative humidity is 68% and strong winds blow in a northeast to south direction predominantly.

== Today ==
=== Sugarcane ===
Sugar accounts for about 5% of Nicaragua's GDP, and the municipality of Chichigalpa has vast areas of sugarcane plantations. A large number of the sugar cane workers have been affected with a chronic kidney disease (CKD), Mesoamerican nephropathy. There is a growing scientific view that CKD is linked to harsh work conditions, particularly long hours exposed to sun without sufficient shade, rest and water. Dr Catharina Wesseling, an epidemiologist based at the Karolinska Institute in Sweden said that while other factors - such as pesticides, heavy metals and genetics – could also play a part, there was "absolutely no doubt" that CKD was an occupational disease.

=== Neighborhoods (Barrios y Comarcas) ===
The municipality is further divided into many neighborhoods (Barrios y Comarcas):

- Candelaria
- Camino de Jesús
- Carlos Fonseca I, II
- Concepción
- El Pueblito
- Erick Ramirez
- Juan Jose Briceño
- La Parroquia
- La Cruz
- Las Palmeras
- Los Lirios
- Mercedes
- Marvin Salazar I, II, III
- Modesto Ramón Palma
- Nueva Candelaria
- Nuevo Amanecer
- Quetzalia
- Ronald Altamirano II
- Reparto. 13 de Julio
- Santiago
- San Antonio
- Valle Viejo I, II
- Wells

== Bibliography ==
- Historia del Municipio de Chichigalpa, 2000
- Sinopsis Histórica de Chichigalpa
