= José León Sandoval =

Nicaraguan politician

José León Sandoval de la Cerda
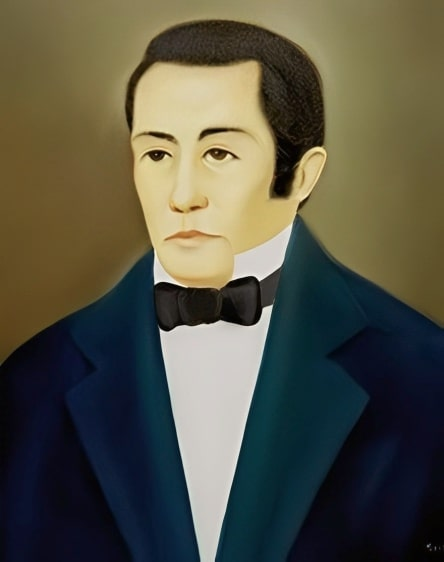

Supreme Director of Nicaragua
- In office April 4, 1845 – March 12, 1847
- Preceded by: Manuel Antonio Blas Sáenz (Acting, Provisional in Masaya)
- Succeeded by: Miguel Ramón Morales (Acting)

Personal details
- Born: 1789 Granada, Spanish Empire
- Died: October, 1854 Granada, Nicaragua
- Party: Republican
- Occupation: Politician

Military service
- Allegiance: Federal Republic of Central America, Nicaragua
- Rank: Brigadier General

José León Sandoval de la Cerda (1789 – 1854) was a Nicaraguan politician, member of the short lived centrist Republican Party, who served as 4th Supreme Director of Nicaragua from 4 April 1845 to 12 March 1847.

A mestizo descendant of the conquistador Gonzalo de Sandoval, Sandoval was a justice of the peace at the close of the colonial period in his native Granada, but he also worked in transporting goods on Lake Nicaragua and the Río San Juan.

Resentful of the privileges of Spanish officials and wealthier creoles, Sandoval supported independence from Spain and then opposed Nicaraguan incorporation into Iturbide's Mexican Empire. In 1825 he became political chief of Granada and later served in other government positions while rising in military rank.

A fervent unionist, he also served Francisco Morazán's federal government in San Salvador. He was supreme director of Nicaragua during the violent struggles among the caudillos Francisco Malespín, José María Vallé, José Trinidad Muñoz, and Bernabé Somoza. He was president of the Nicaraguan Congress from 1845 to 1846, and from 1853 to 1854. Although a liberal, Sandoval remained loyal to the elected governments, and under the conservative Fruto Chamorro, he directed Granada's defense against the siege begun in May 1854 by Máximo Jérez, during the beginning stages of the Filibuster War. Brigadier General Sandoval died in this defense and was buried in Granada.

== See also ==
- Laureano Pineda
- Filibuster War
- Francisco Castellón

== Bibliography ==
- Álvarez Lejarza, Emilio (1947). Ensayo biográfico del prócer José León Sandoval. Managua, Nic. C.A.: Editorial Atlántida. OCLC 9920513.

Political offices
Preceded by Blas Antonio Sáenz (acting, originally provisional in Masaya)	Supreme Director of Nicaragua; 1845 – 1847	Succeeded by Miguel Ramón Morales (acting)
