= San Pedro del Norte =

- Municipality
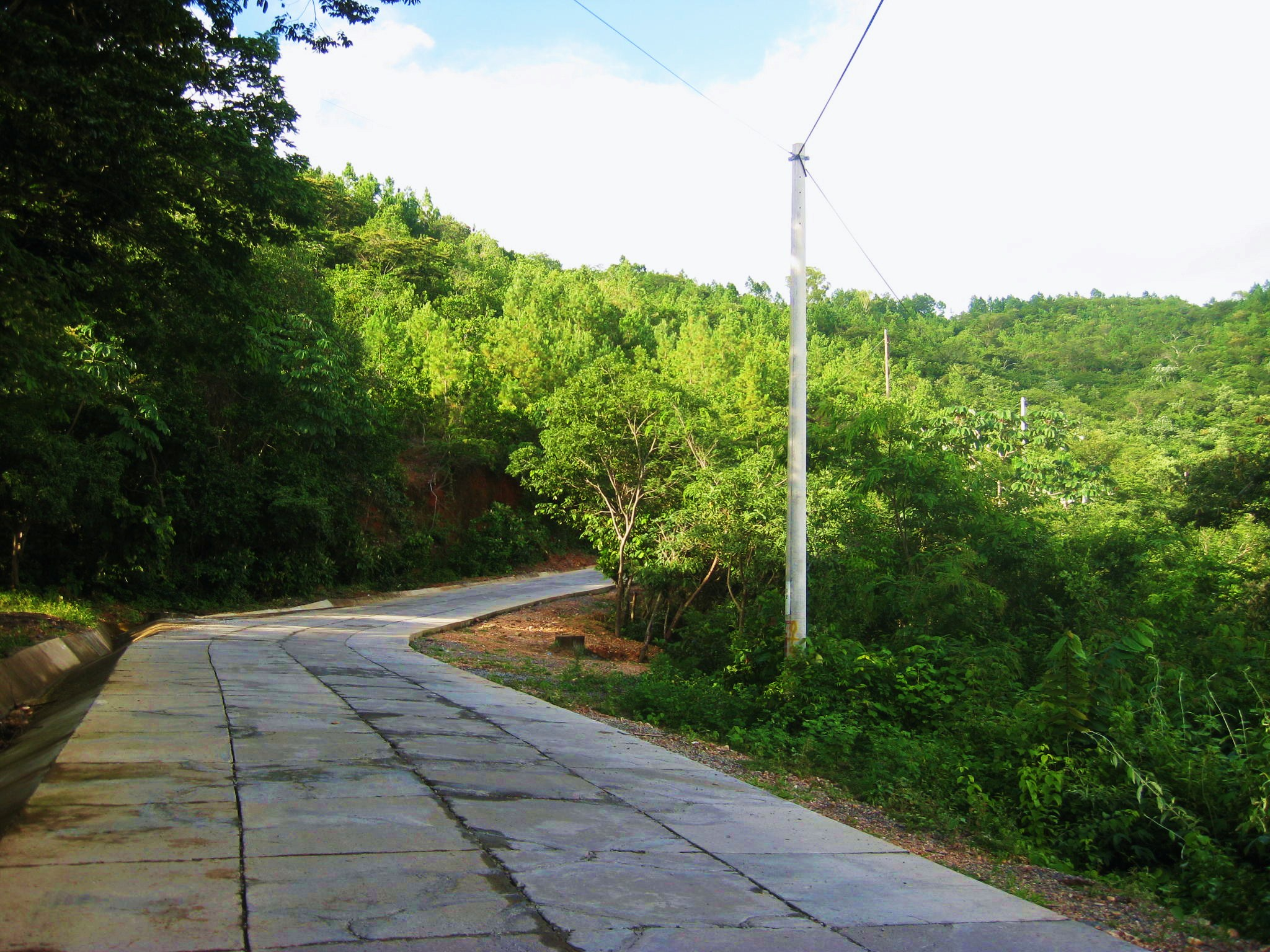

- Location in Nicaragua
- Coordinates: 13°16′N 86°53′W
- Country: Nicaragua
- Department: Chinandega

Area
  - Municipality: 28 sq mi (72 km^{2})

Population (2005)
  - Municipality: 4,719
  - Density: 170/sq mi (66/km^{2})
  - Urban: 651

San Pedro del Norte (Spanish pronunciation: [sam ˈpeðɾo ðel ˈnoɾte]) is a municipality in the Chinandega department of Nicaragua.

== Geography ==
The municipality have a territorial erea of 71.54 square kilometers. It's erea contains La Botija mountain range which borders Honduras in northwest. The rivers of Guasaule and Torondano crosses the municipality.
