= Joaquín Rivera =

Honduran politician

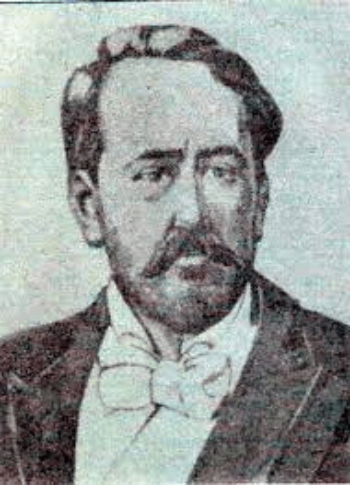

Joaquín Rivera Bragas (July 25, 1795, Tegucigalpa, Honduras - February 6, 1845, Comayagua, Honduras) was a Honduran politician and military leader who served as the Head of the State of Honduras under the Federal Republic of Central America from 7 January 1833 - 31 December 1836. He served for approximately four years, as was planned, after popular elections for the office were held and he was inaugurated. His Vice-Jefe was Francisco Ferrera. His period of rule was marked by peace and unity with the other states in the Federal Republic.

== See also ==
- List of presidents of Honduras
- José María Martinez Salinas
