= Manuel Antonio Blas Sáenz =

Nicaraguan politician

Supreme Director of Nicaragua Provisional
- In office January 20, 1845 – April 4, 1845
- Preceded by: Emiliano Madriz (interim in León); Silvestre Selva (appointed by Malespín, in Masaya)
- Succeeded by: José León Sandoval

Personal details
- Born: around 1800 Rivas, Captaincy General of Guatemala
- Died: unknown

Manuel Antonio Blas Sáenz (b. around 1800 in Rivas) was a Nicaraguan politician who served as acting Supreme Director of Nicaragua from February 13 to April 4, 1845. From January 20 to February 13, he served as provisional Supreme Director based in the city of Masaya, against the government of Silvestre Selva.

== Biography ==
=== Early Political Career ===
In July 1842 Sáenz engaged with Dionisio Zapata in border negotiations with Costa Rica. In 1843 Sáenz became a Senator in the Legislative Assembly, under Supreme Director Pablo Buitrago y Benavente, and initiated the law to found the first national newspaper in Nicaragua called "Registro Oficial".

=== Malespín's War ===
Silvestre Selva was appointed by the invading forces led by Francisco Malespín, as Supreme Director of Nicaragua. Sáenz and José León Sandoval declared Masaya the seat of government in early 1845 and formed a counter-government, where Sáenz was formally declared Supreme Director in January 20 of that year. On January 24, Malespín entered a long-besieged León, and his troops massacred it. He later returned to El Salvador where he was soon overthrown by Joaquín Eufrasio Guzmán and Fermín Palacios on February 15. Selva was able to escape from León after Malespín was overthrown.

=== After the War ===
The commander of the "Ejército Protector de Paz", the name of the army originally led by Malespín, José Trinidad Muñoz, was resigned to the governorship of León and Sáenz broke the peace treaty dictated by Malespín on March 3, 1845. In his speech at the opening of Parliament on March 10, Sáenz called for a nationwide unity to be formed which would bring international respect, internal security, credibility and common understanding.

Political offices
Preceded by Emiliano Madriz (interim, in León); Silvestre Selva (appointed by Malespín, in Masaya)	Supreme Director of Nicaragua (provisional); 1845	Succeeded by José León Sandoval
