= Somotillo =

- Municipality
- Location in Nicaragua
- Coordinates: 13°02′N 86°55′W
- Country: Nicaragua
- Department: Chinandega

Area
  - Municipality: 280 sq mi (725 km^{2})

Population (2022 estimate)
  - Municipality: 35,044
  - Density: 125/sq mi (48.3/km^{2})
  - Urban: 20,211

Somotillo is a town and a municipality in the Chinandega department of Nicaragua.

== Geography ==
According to the Instituto Nicaragüense de Estudios Territoriales (INETER), the municipality of Somotillo measures 724.71 km^{2} and lies approximately 41 meters above sea level. Physiographically, most of the municipality lies north and east of the Nicaraguan Depression or Graben in the western foothills of the central cordillera of the country. The area drains into the Pacific, largely through the Estero Real. The town of Somotillo is located on the northern bank of the Rio Gallo, also known as the Rio Grande. A seasonal stream known as the Tecomapa runs north of the town.

=== Hurricane Mitch ===
During Hurricane Mitch in 1998, these rivers overflowed their banks and threatened the town. The municipality was severely affected by Mitch and several deaths occurred.

The climate is a dry tropical one, with strongly pronounced rainy and dry seasons. Soils are of volcanic origin and are deep and fertile. The area is largely agricultural with some cattle ranching. Common crops in the area are maize, cotton, sesame, and wheat, mainly grown by smallholders and tenant farmers. The economy is also influenced by the long border with Honduras. A major highway passes through the town of Somotillo to the border crossing at Guasaule, creating customs and immigration jobs in Somotillo, as well as opportunities for smuggling. The most current census figures suggest a population of approximately 33,000.

== International relations ==
=== Twin towns – Sister cities ===
Somotillo is twinned with:

- (United States) Bennington, Vermont
