= Santo Tomás del Norte =

- Municipality
- Location in Nicaragua
- Coordinates: 13°11′N 86°56′W
- Country: Nicaragua
- Department: Chinandega

Area
  - Municipality: 15 sq mi (40 km^{2})

Population (2005)
  - Municipality: 7,124
  - Density: 460/sq mi (180/km^{2})
  - Urban: 1,229

Santo Tomás del Norte is a municipality in the Chinandega department of Nicaragua.

Santo Tomas is a small town surrounded by the Guasaule river. It divides Nicaragua and Honduras.

== History ==
In March 1984, contras and Honduran troops opened fire in the area killing a one year old child.
