= Chinandega Department =

Department of Nicaragua

Coordinates: 12°37′N 87°09′W

Chinandega Departamento de Chinandega
- Department
- Flag Coat of arms

- Location within Nicaragua
- Country: Nicaragua
- Capital: Chinandega

Area
  - Total: 4,822 km^{2} (1,862 sq mi)

Population (2023 estimate)
  - Total: 445,784
- ISO 3166 code: NI-CI

Chinandega is an administrative division and department in northwestern Nicaragua. It extends from the inland plains towards the Gulf of Fonseca in the Pacific coast. Its capital is Chinandega. The department is characterized by fertile plains, and coastal settlements including the major port Corinto.

== Etymology ==
The name Chinandega is derived from Nahuatl language word "Chinantecal" which means "neighbour of Chinantlan". This comes from a combination of two words, "Chinan" meaning temporary housing and "tlan" which means a "place" literally meaning the "place of temporary housing".

== History ==
The department was the location of the pre-Columbian Nahua kingdom of Teswatlan, and the indigenous inhabitants of Chinandega are the Chorotegas and the Nahuas. Nicaragua was occupied by the Spanish and the British later. Few of the colonial structures, that are referenced in early Christian ecclesiastical records from the 16th to the 18th centuries, still exist in the region. The department was formally established in 1839.

== Geography ==
Chinandega is located in northwestern Nicaragua, bordering Honduras to the north and extends inland from the Gulf of Fonseca on the Pacific coast. The department covers an area of 4,822 km^{2} (1,862 sq mi). Its capital is Chinandega, located 132 km (82 mi) from the national capital of Managua and 70 km (43 mi) from the Honduran border. The department includes thirteen municipalities: Chinandega, Chichigalpa, Cinco Pinos, Corinto, El Realejo, El Viejo, Posoltega, Puerto Morazán, San Pedro del Norte, Santo Tomás del Norte, San Juan de Cinco Pinos, Somotillo, and Villanueva. The port of Corinto functions as one of Nicaragua’s principal Pacific ports and functions as an important hub for exports.

The department's landscape consists of fertile inland plains, and coastal zones interspersed with wetlands and beaches. The Cosiguina Peninsula, extending into the Gulf of Fonseca, is located in the northwest corner of the department. There are several volcanic formations in the peninsula that form part of the Los Maribios volcanic complex. The San Cristóbal Volcano, at 1,745 m (5,725 ft), is the highest volcano in the country. There are several hot springs, and estuarys along the coast.

Chinandega has a tropical humid and dry climate, with a dry season from November to April and a rainy season from May to October.

== Demographics ==
As per 2023 estimate, Chinandega has an estimated population of 445,784 inhabitants.

== Culture ==
Chinandega has a mixed cultural and religious heritage shaped by early indigenous influence and post medieval colonial traditions. The Chorotega-Nicarao museum in Chinandega houses more than 1,200 archaeological artifacts including ceramics, jade, stone tools, and gold objects from the Pre-Columbian era. Religious heritage sites in the department include the parishes of Santa Ana and Guadalupe, which have several religious architecture and imagery from the colonial period.

Several municipalities in the department celebrate annual festivals in honour of specific religious and mythological figures. The "Lavada de la Plata" is celebrated annually on 6 December in honour of the virgin of El Viejo, and dates back to the early 16th century. The ritual consists of cleaning and offering various silver objects to El Veijo. Puerto Morazán celebrates an annual festival on 27 June in honour of the virgin Perpetuo Socorro, San Francisco del Norte in the second week of March to honour Senor de los Milagros, San Pedro del Norte on 29 June in honour of San Pedro and San Pablo, and Santo Tomás del Norte in the first week of way in honour of Santa Cruz.
