= José Núñez (politician) =

Nicaraguan Politician and Doctor

Salvador de la Patria José Núñez

Head of State of Nicaragua
- In office 10 March 1834 – 23 April 1835
- Leader: Bernardo Méndez de Figueroa
- Preceded by: Benito Morales (Acting)
- Succeeded by: José Zepeda
- In office 25 January 1837 – 12 January 1838
- Preceded by: José Zepeda
- Succeeded by: Francisco Jiménez Rubio (Acting)
- In office 13 March 1838 – 5 January 1839
- Preceded by: Francisco Jiménez Rubio (Acting)
- Succeeded by: Evaristo Rocha (Acting); Joaquín del Cossío (Acting, until May 15)

Personal details
- Born: 1800 Solentiname Islands, Captaincy General of Guatemala
- Died: 5 March 1880 (aged 79–80) León, Nicaragua
- Party: Legitimist
- Occupation: Doctor, Politician
- Nickname(s): El tarado de la Patria; The moron of the Fatherland

José Núñez (1800 – 5 March 1880) was a conservative Nicaraguan medical doctor and politician who served as the 11th, 13th, and 15th Supreme Chief of Nicaragua, and 1st Supreme Director of Independent Nicaragua.

Núñez and Joaquín del Cossío were the most important figures in the Independence of Nicaragua, as they began the first and second transitional governments that lead to Nicaragua's independence.

== Early life ==
Born around the year 1800 in the Solentiname archipelago located in Lake Nicaragua, where he spent his early years.

Fray Ramón Rojas sent him to study in the city of León. Later, he travelled to Chile, where he graduated with a degree in medicine and surgery in the city of Santiago. Back in Nicaragua, he practiced his profession in León, and later taught medicine at the University in that city.

== As Head of State of Nicaragua ==
=== First term ===
In December 1833, the administration of Dionisio de Herrera voluntarily ended in advance and was followed temporarily by advisor Benito Morales as head of the executive branch. On 10 March 1834, the Representative Council appointed Núñez as Head of State of Nicaragua on an interim basis. During his administration, the famous eruption of the Cosigüina volcano occurred, which caused chaos in much of Nicaragua.

==== Flores' Rebellion ====
On 29 May 1834, Colonel Cándido Flores, head of the military forces of Granada, ignored the government presided over in León by José Núñez and took up arms in Metapa and Granada, demanding the reform of the federal Constitution. With Núñez's patience exhausted, he used military force to subdue Flores, who, after being defeated in Managua on 18 August, fled to Granada, where he was unable to organize a resistance. Before the arrival of Núñez's forces, Flores fled from Granada to Costa Rica with his friends, and the city was left in the hands of a disorganized mob that committed lootings and robberies, especially in the houses of foreigners. Flores would die shortly after in Costa Rica, after being unable to return to Nicaragua.

On 23 April 1835, he handed over the command to José Zepeda and became Vice Chief.

=== Second term ===
==== Assassination of José Zepeda ====
On 25 January 1837 Casto Fonseca, a medical graduate, and Colonel Bernardo Méndez de Figueroa "El Pavo", known mostly for his love of gambling, stormed the León barracks. They freed a man named Braulio Mendiola out of jail, who was then escorted by the assailants with orders to arrest Zepeda, Colonel Román Valladares, Deputy Pascual Rivas and Captain Evaristo Berríos.

Zepeda and his partner in unionist battles, Colonel Balladares, were killed and later buried in the Cemetery of Guadalupe. Deputy Chief Núñez assumed the leadership of the State to finish Zepeda's term, which had two years left to finish. Núñez did not arrest the rebels, but rather appeased Méndez and appointed him General Commander of Arms, but the criminal Braulio Mendiola was captured and executed for the killings.

==== Military absolutism imposed by the Rebels ====
Bernardo Méndez reestablished the military absolutism initiated by José Anacleto Ordóñez, even against the will of Núñez, who was at that point powerless to oppose. After Méndez's fall from grace, Militarism would continue under the new General Commander of Arms, Casto Fonseca. Fonseca promoted himself to the highest rank of "Grand Marshal" and wore operetta garb, from 1837 until he died in 1845, during which time he became the true arbiter of political life in Nicaragua, with the ability to even influence the elections of the supreme authorities of the State, which aroused the uncalmed traditional passionate hatreds.

== Independence of Nicaragua ==
Núñez was constitutionally elected for his second term that began on 13 March 1838. Joaquín del Cossío was chosen as deputy chief, and Pablo Buitrago was appointed as minister general.

On 30 April 1838, Nicaragua became the first State of the Federal Republic of Central America to separate from the union. A Constituent Assembly was convened, which issued the Constitution of 1838, and on 20 December of that year, the friendship and alliance agreement known as the Oreamuno-Buitrago Treaty and a contract related to the sale of Costa Rican tobacco to Nicaragua were signed with Costa Rica.

=== First Transitional Government ===
The first Independent Nicaraguan Government was essentially a transitional government intended to prepare for the transition to a constitutional order, and so was the second one. Although according to the constitution, the term of office of the Supreme Director lasted two years, on 5 January 1839, Núñez transferred power to Joaquín del Cossío, making him acting Supreme Director, but Evaristo Rocha essentially took that position. It is unknown when Cossío took office.

== Death and legacy ==
Núñez died in León on 5 March 1880. The Legislative Assembly of Nicaragua gave him the honorary title of "Salvador de la Patria".

Political offices
Preceded by Benito Morales (acting)	Head of State of Nicaragua (acting); 1834 – 1835	Succeeded by José Zepeda

Political offices
Preceded by José Zepeda	Head of State of Nicaragua; 1837 – 1838	Succeeded by Francisco Jiménez Rubio (acting)

Political offices
Preceded by Francisco Jiménez Rubio (acting)	Supreme Director of Nicaragua (first transitional government); 1838 – 1839	Succeeded by Evaristo Rocha (acting); Joaquín del Cossío (acting, until may 15)
