= Francisco Ferrera =

Honduran politician

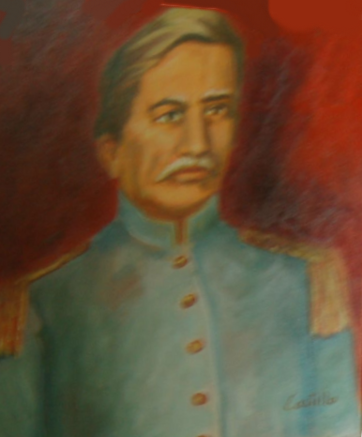

Head of State of Honduras
- In office 1833–1834
- Preceded by: Joaquín Rivera
- Succeeded by: Joaquín Rivera

President of Honduras
- In office 1 January 1841 – 31 December 1842
- Vice President: Coronado Chávez
- Preceded by: Francisco Zelaya y Ayes
- Succeeded by: Council of Ministers

President of Honduras
- In office 23 February 1843 – 31 December 1844
- Vice President: Coronado Chávez; Felipe Jáuregui
- Preceded by: Council of Ministers
- Succeeded by: Council of Ministers

Personal details
- Born: 29 January 1794 Cantarranas, Honduras
- Died: 10 April 1851 (aged 57) Chalatenango, El Salvador
- Party: Conservative Party
- Occupation: Lawyer, Statesman

Francisco Ferrera (29 January 1794 – 10 April 1851) was the president of Honduras. He was born in San Juan de Flores, Honduras.

Ferrera joined the guerrerista campaigns of General Francisco Morazán and participated brilliantly in the battles of The Trinidad and Gualcho. In addition, he saw action in the pacification of Olancho. In March 1832, Ferrera faced Vicente Domínguez in Yoro and later in Sonaguera and Trujillo, defeating him in both opportunities. Due to his bravery on the battlefield, he was promoted by General Morazán.

In October 1838, Ferrera rebelled against the federalist government of General Morazán and fought to make Honduras a free state. On 5 April 1839, he was defeated by General Morazán in the battle of the Spirit Santo in El Salvador. After that humiliating defeat, Ferrera took refuge in Nicaragua.

He was Provisional Chief of State of Honduras (1833–1834) and Constitutional President (1841–1844).

"The Republic, after the dissolution of the Federation, was inaugurated under a Conservative régime. On [11 January] 1840, the Congress was installed with ceremonies more religious than political. Forty-four Te Deum masses were sung on that day, and President Ferrera was 'besmoked with incense in the cathedral.'"

He was re-elected President in 1847, resigning that same year before taking office. Ferrera died in Chalatenango, El Salvador, on 10 April 1851.

== See also ==
- List of presidents of Honduras
