= Francisco Malespín =

President of El Salvador (1806–1846)

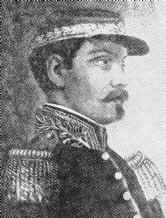

3rd President of El Salvador
- In office 7 February 1844 – 15 February 1845
- Vice President: Joaquín Eufrasio Guzmán
- Preceded by: Juan José Guzmán
- Succeeded by: Eugenio Aguilar

Personal details
- Born: 28 September 1806 Izalco, Intendancy of San Salvador
- Died: 25 November 1846 (aged 40) San Fernando, Chalatenango, El Salvador
- Party: Conservative
- Profession: military

Francisco Malespín Herrera (1806 – 25 November 1846) was a Salvadoran military officer and politician who served as the 3rd President of El Salvador from 1844 to 1845. He was elected in 1844 but was eventually deposed by his vice president Joaquín Eufrasio Guzmán after invading and overthrowing the liberal government in Nicaragua. He also led El Salvador to a short unsuccessful war against Guatemala. After being deposed, Malespín returned to El Salvador with forces from Honduras, but he was captured and assassinated. Some of Malespín's closest allies were Francisco Ferrera in Honduras as well as Juan Lindo, both conservatives. He was supported by Honduras after his downfall.

== Biography ==
Francisco Malespin was born on 28 September 1806 in Izalco, Intendancy of San Salvador. Francisco Malespín Herrera was the son of the marriage composed by Juan Malespín and Luisa Herrera and Rodríguez, who were domiciled in San Salvador in 1824. During the Central American Civil War (1826 - 1829), he was still young, he distinguished himself in the Battle of Mexico in 1828 and in the seizure of the Fortress of San Fernando de Omoa in Honduras in 1832.

=== Definitive annihilation of the State of Los Altos ===
Malespín stood out as the leader of the Conservative party and collaborated with General Rafael Carrera in Guatemala in his battles against Francisco Morazán and the liberal Creoles of the State of Los Altos.

When General Agustín Guzmán arrived in Quetzaltenango with the news that Morazán had triumphed in the city of Nueva Guatemala de la Asunción on 19 March 1840, the liberal Creole elite of the city declared the State of Los Altos in force again. Agustín whom Morazán had released from prison that night - did not know that Carrera had made Morazán think that he had obtained the triumph and then had crushed his forces. Carrera then sent Malespín to warn the Quiché and Cakchiquel communities to prepare again to fight the Quetzaltecos Creoles, and then left for Quetzaltenango determined to excite the Altes liberals; upon hearing this news, most of the members of the council fled and the few who remained wanted to retract and apologize for having tried to, but while the indigenous people of the region were chasing the Creoles who fled, Carrera arrested the members of the council who had stayed and then sent them to be shot, despite the claims of the Altense population who murmured "Massacre! Massacre!" As a result, the liberal Creoles were weakened and diminished, and the capital conservatives frightened; for their part, the indigenous populations of Quetzaltenango realized that they had a strong ally in Carrera.

== President of El Salvador ==
With Morazán defeated, Carrera and his army entered El Salvador and imposed a conservative regime, with Malespín as Commander of the State Arms and Jorge de Viteri y Ungo - a Guatemalan priest member of the ultra-conservative Aycinena Clan of Guatemala - as parish priest of San Salvador.

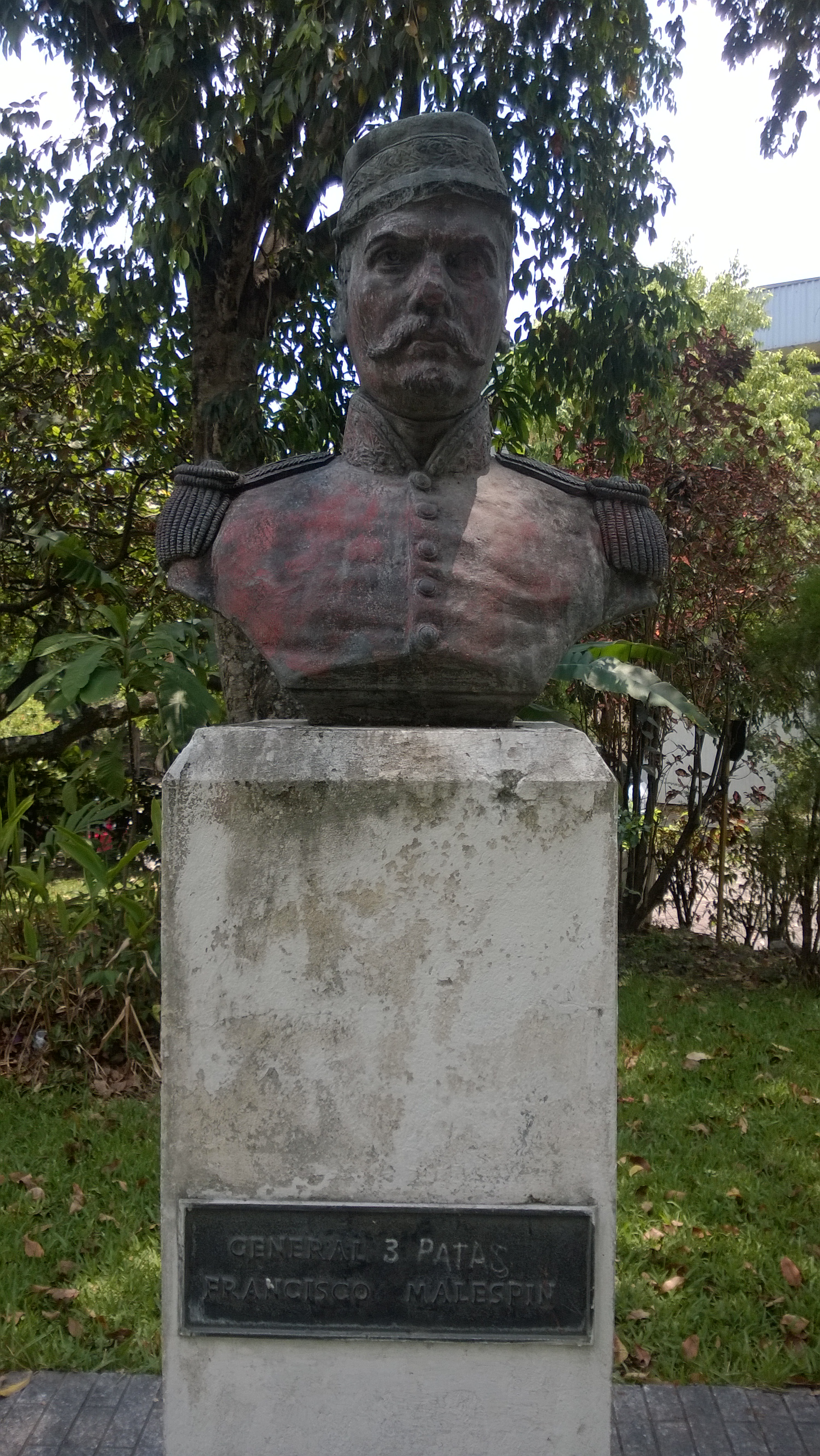
Bust of Francisco Malespín in the University of El Salvador.

With the support of Rafael Carrera and Francisco Ferrera, Malespín powerfully influenced the successive governments of Norberto Ramírez, Juan Lindo, José Escolástico Marín, Juan José Guzmán and Fermín Palacios. In 1842 his godfather, the priest Jorge de Viteri y Ungo, visited the Vatican where he managed to establish a diocese for El Salvador - which was created for him by Pope Gregory XVI through the Bull Universalis Ecclesia Procuratio on 28 September 1842, also elevating its parish to the rank of cathedral, known until then as El Sagrario Parish. On 28 January 1843, Viteri y Ungo was elected as the first Bishop of San Salvador, being consecrated the following day. On 25 September, he arrived in the city of San Salvador to take office and support his godson Malespín. On 7 February 1844, Fermín Palacios handed over the Presidency to General Malespín, who had been elected President of the Republic, for the constitutional period 1844 to 1846. As a representative of the conservatives, Malespín agreed with the Legislative Assembly to decree the restoration of the jurisdiction ecclesiastical to the Salvadoran Clergy, annulling the law of 26 August 1830 that had abolished said jurisdiction and that was issued during the government of the liberal José Damián Villacorta. On 25 October 1844, allied with the Honduran government in its fight against the Nicaraguan government, Malespín handed over the Presidency of the Republic to his vice president, General Joaquín Eufrasio Guzmán, and the Army Command to Calixto Malespín, his brother. Then he marched towards Nicaragua and in 1845 he occupied the city of León.

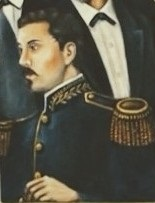
Malespin is considered one of the greatest conservative leaders in the 1840s.

Where he is remembered for his fondness for rum and his volatile character that caused excesses of his troops that burned down the city and looted the sacred objects of its churches. But on 15 February 1845, despite returning "victorious" from the campaign in Nicaragua, the Army ignored him and the Legislative Power declared his election as President of the Republic void, and he was replaced by Vice President Guzmán; In addition, due to the abuses committed - to which was added the execution of the priest Dionisio Urcuyo y Crespín - Bishop Viteri y Ungo excommunicated him on 23 February 1845 in the Cathedral of San Salvador.[8] Malespín fled to Honduras. where he received protection from President Coronado Chávez.

Political offices
Preceded by Fermín Palacios (acting)	President of El Salvador; 1844–1845	Succeeded by Joaquín Eufrasio Guzmán
