= Battle of La Trinidad =

Battle of the First Central American Civil War

- Part of First Central American Civil War
- Depiction of the Battle of La Trinidad
Date	11 November 1827
Location	La Trinidad, Honduras
Result	Protective Allied Army of the Law victory: Francisco Morazán is elected president of Honduras; Withdrawal of Federal Troops from Honduran territory

Belligerents
Federal Republic of Central America	Protective Allied Army of the Law

Commanders and leaders
José Justo Milla (POW); Colonel Hernández; Captain Rosa Medina	Francisco Morazán; Colonel Remigio Díaz; Colonel Román Valladares; Colonel Ramón Pacheco; Colonel José María Gutiérrez Osejo; Colonel José de Jesús Osejo; Captain Francisco Ferrera; Corporal José Trinidad Cabañas

Strength
2nd Federal Central American Battalion (approximately 1,500 men), cavalry, artillery.	Cavalry, soldiers from Honduras, El Salvador, and Nicaragua (approximately 650 men).

Casualties and losses
40 dead and wounded	

The Battle of La Trinidad occurred in Honduras in 1827, during the revolutionary period in Central America between 1811 and 1844.

== Background ==
The President of the Federal Republic of Central America, Salvadoran General Manuel José Arce, ordered Lieutenant General José Justo Milla, former Deputy Chief of the State of Honduras, to overthrow the de facto Honduran government under Dionisio de Herrera.

On January 19, 1827, Lieutenant General José Justo Milla marched out in command of the Second Federal Battalion crossing the Honduran borders and taking the town of Santa Rosa de Copán without much resistance. He then took possession of a tobacco factory, an important place in western Honduras, and headed for the city of Comayagua. Milla set up his headquarters in San Esteban, southwest of the Honduran capital.

== Siege of Comayagua ==
On April 4, 1827 while General Milla prepared to attack the city, Francisco Morazán was among the city's defense force. Milla ordered an advance and, without respite, faced the Honduran troops under heavy fire. The action ended in Milla's favor, who proceeded to set fire to the city. President of Honduras Dionisio Herrera was taken prisoner on May 9, 1827, who then capitulated the following day and was sent to Guatemala. While José Justo Milla was taking control, General Morazán managed to escape the city with Colonel Remigio Díaz and Colonel José Antonio Márquez. Morazán and his officers went to Tegucigalpa, where they were reinforced with 300 men and made plans to return to Comayagua. Before they could reach Comayagua, on the heights of Villa de San Antonio, they were attacked by an advance troop under the command of Colonel Hernández and Captain Rosa Medina. Morazán took a defensive position at the estate of La Maradiaga and entered into combat with on May 29, where Colonel Hernández and his invading forces were defeated. Morazán returned to Tegucigalpa and reinforced again.

== Allied Army ==
Francisco Morazán, having safe passage, went to Choluteca in the south of Honduras where he met with his family in Ojojona. He was then taken prisoner by the Commandant of Arms of Tegucigalpa. Being let out on bail some 23 days later, he was obliged to retire to El Salvador on July 28, 1827. Following this he went to León in Nicaragua where his friend, General José Anacleto Ordóñez Bermúdez, known as "Cleto" Ordóñez, provided him with 135 men. Later, he was joined by Salvadoran soldiers under the command of Colonel José Zepeda. Morazán, commanding the allied forces, managed to return to Choluteca where Colonel José Antonio Márquez was waiting with a division of men to join the "cause of liberty". The first Honduran town they arrived in was San Antonio de Texiguat which also offered support with arms and men.

== The Battle ==
Lieutenant General José Justo Milla discovered the presence of Francisco Morazán in the south of Honduras and quickly moved with his men to Tegucigalpa where he established his headquarters. Morazán went to the town of Sabanagrande to prepare for a decisive combat in the "Valle de la Trinidad".

At 9:00 in the morning of November 11, 1827, Colonel Ramón Pacheco made the first maneuver commanding his force of men to take a position at the road leading from Ojojona to the Valle de la Trinidad.

Colonel Remigio Díaz commanding his force of 150 men moved along the shore of a "Sicatacaro" ravine, heading northeast from Ojojona to the Valle de la Trinidad to attack the enemy's rear.

General Morazán along with Colonel Román Valladares in command of the other detachment of the Allied forces surrounded the "Caranguije" hill and attacked the right flank of the Federal forces.

The fighting intensified during the next five hours, and at 3:00 pm the Federal troops under Milla were crushed by the men under the command of General Francisco Morazán. Defeated, General José Justo Milla and some of his officers that survived fled the field of battle leaving documents, trunks, and other equipment behind. There were 40 casualties including wounded and dead.

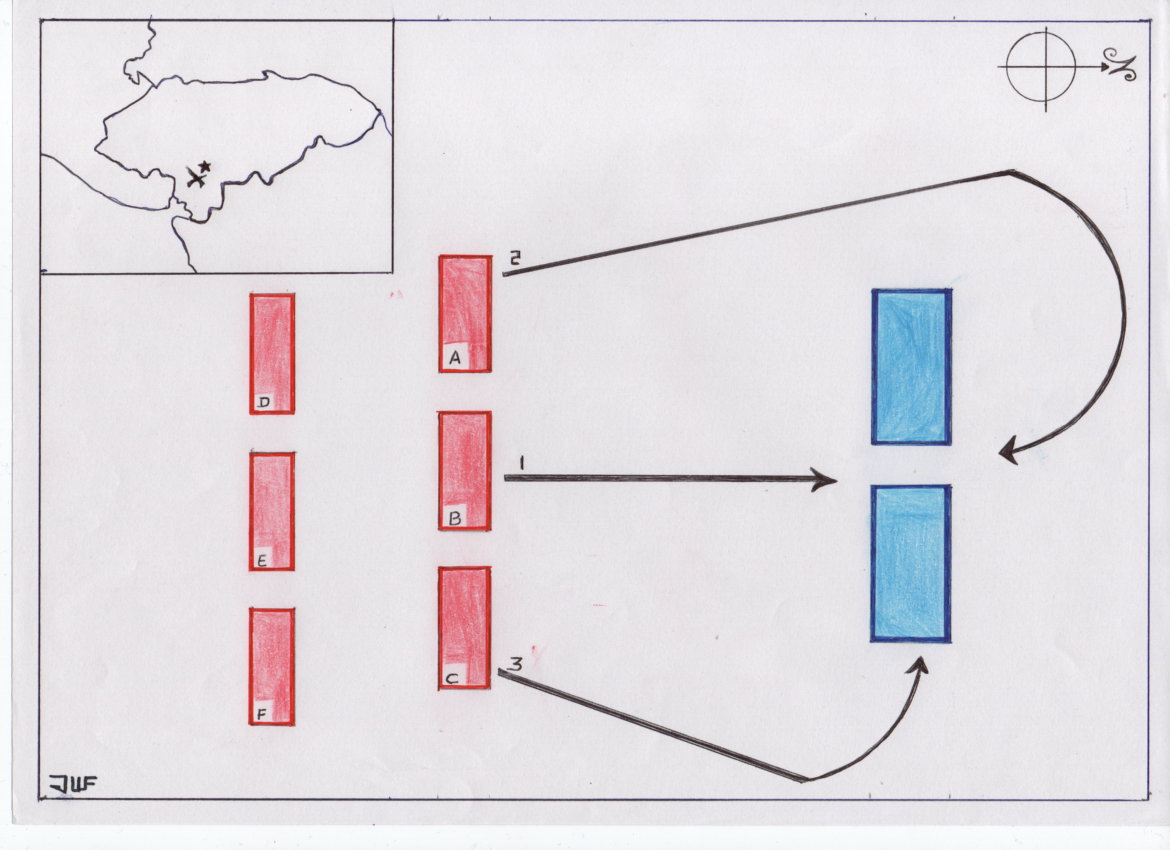
Plan of the Battle of La Trinidad, Honduras (1827). Movements: 1) B) Company under Colonel Ramón Pacheco (150 men). 2) A) Company under Colonel Remigio Díaz (150 men). 3) C) Company under Francisco Morazán and Colonel Román Valladares (150 men). D) Reinforcement company under Colonel José Zepeda (100 men). E) Reinforcement company under Colonel José María Gutiérrez Osejo (100 men). F) Reinforcement company under Captain Francisco Ferrera (100 men). In blue is the 2nd Federal Battalion and reinforcements of Hondurans and Guatemalans.

The rest of the Allied force under the command of Colonel José María Gutíerrez Osejo, Colonel José de Jesús Osejo, Colonel Leonés, and Captain Francisco Ferrera did not take part in the action.

After this victory, Morazán marched to Tegucigalpa and took the city on November 12. On the 26th of the same month he arrived at the capital Comayagua where he made a triumphal entrance and occupied the leadership of the State of Honduras which was temporarily held by Miguel Eusebio Bustamante. Morazán appointed Colonel José de Jesús Osejo as military commander of Comayagua and left in his command 200 men. In the same way, he appointed Colonel José María Gutiérrez Osejo as military commander of Tegucigalpa.

== Results ==
- General José Francisco Morazán Quezada was named President of the Government of Honduras on November 27, 1827. He then ordered his Allied troops to the north and west coasts to take control of the entire Honduran State.
- General José Justo Milla was taken prisoner in May 1829, prosecuted, and sentenced to exile from the Federal Republic of Central America for life. He then permanently resided in Mexico.
- Dionisio de Herrera was released from Guatemala and returned to Honduras in 1829.
- The Federal Republic of Central America began to destabilize due to actions of separatists that conspired against it, beginning the period of Central American revolutions.
- Following the second presidency of Francisco Morazán in the federal republic, the position fell to Diego Vigil Cocaña in 1838 who would be the last President of this federal union.

== See also ==
- First Central American Civil War
