= First Central American Civil War =

Military conflict in Central America from 1826 to 1829

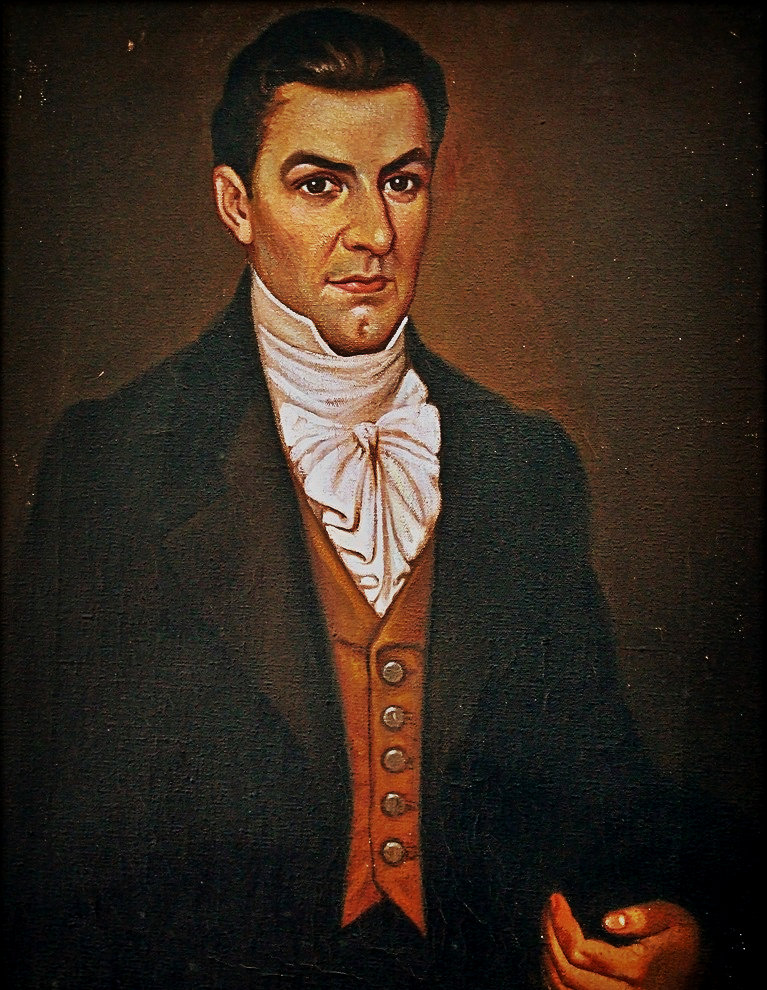
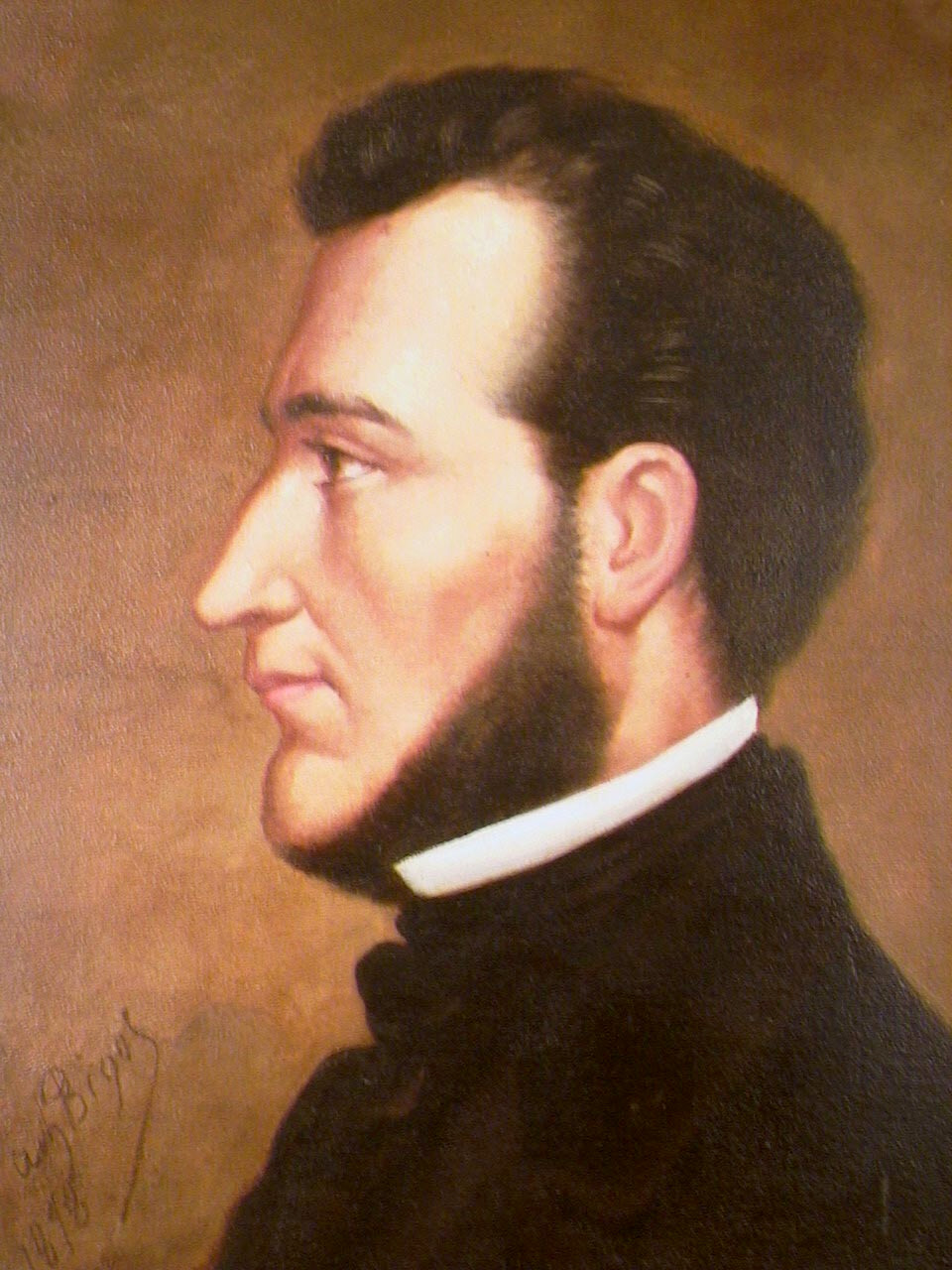
- Conservative leader President Manuel José Arce (left) and liberal leader General Francisco Morazán (right)
Date	6 September 1826 – 25 June 1829; (2 years, 9 months, 2 weeks and 5 days)
Location	Federal Republic of Central America, primarily in El Salvador, Honduras, and Guatemala
Result	Protective Allied Army of the Law victory: Manuel José Arce overthrown; Francisco Morazán elected president

Belligerents
Federal government; Conservatives; Loyalist provinces; Guatemala; Honduras (1827)	Anti-Arce rebels (Protective Allied Army of the Law after 1828); Liberals; Rebellious provinces; El Salvador; Honduras; Nicaragua

Commanders and leaders
Manuel José Arce; José Justo Milla; Mariano Aycinena (surrendered); Mariano Beltranena; Antonio Irisarri (POW)	Francisco Morazán; Dionisio de Herrera; Antonio Márquez; Manuel Arzú; Francisco Barrundia; Mariano Prado

Strength
4,000–4,900 soldiers	4,000 soldiers (1828)

Casualties and losses
Guatemala: 501 killed	El Salvador: 1,694 killed; Honduras: 125 killed; Nicaragua: 375 killed
- 15,000+ military and civilian killed, 819 military wounded

The First Central American Civil War (Spanish: Primera Guerra Civil Centroamericana), also known as the Federal War of 1826–1829 (Guerra Federal de 1826–1829), was a civil political and military conflict within the Federal Republic of Central America which lasted from 1826 until 1829. The civil war was fought between liberals led by General Francisco Morazán and conservatives led by General Manuel José Arce, the president of Central America and a former liberal.

The civil war began in September 1826 after Arce ordered the arrest of liberal Guatemalan governor Juan Barrundia. In October 1826, Federal troops took total control of Guatemala and Arce dissolved the Federal Congress in a self-coup. Arce launched military campaigns into El Salvador and Honduras in 1827 and fought liberal forces led by Morazán. In 1829, Morazán lead an invasion of Guatemala leading to the collapse of Arce's government.

== Background ==
=== Central American independence ===
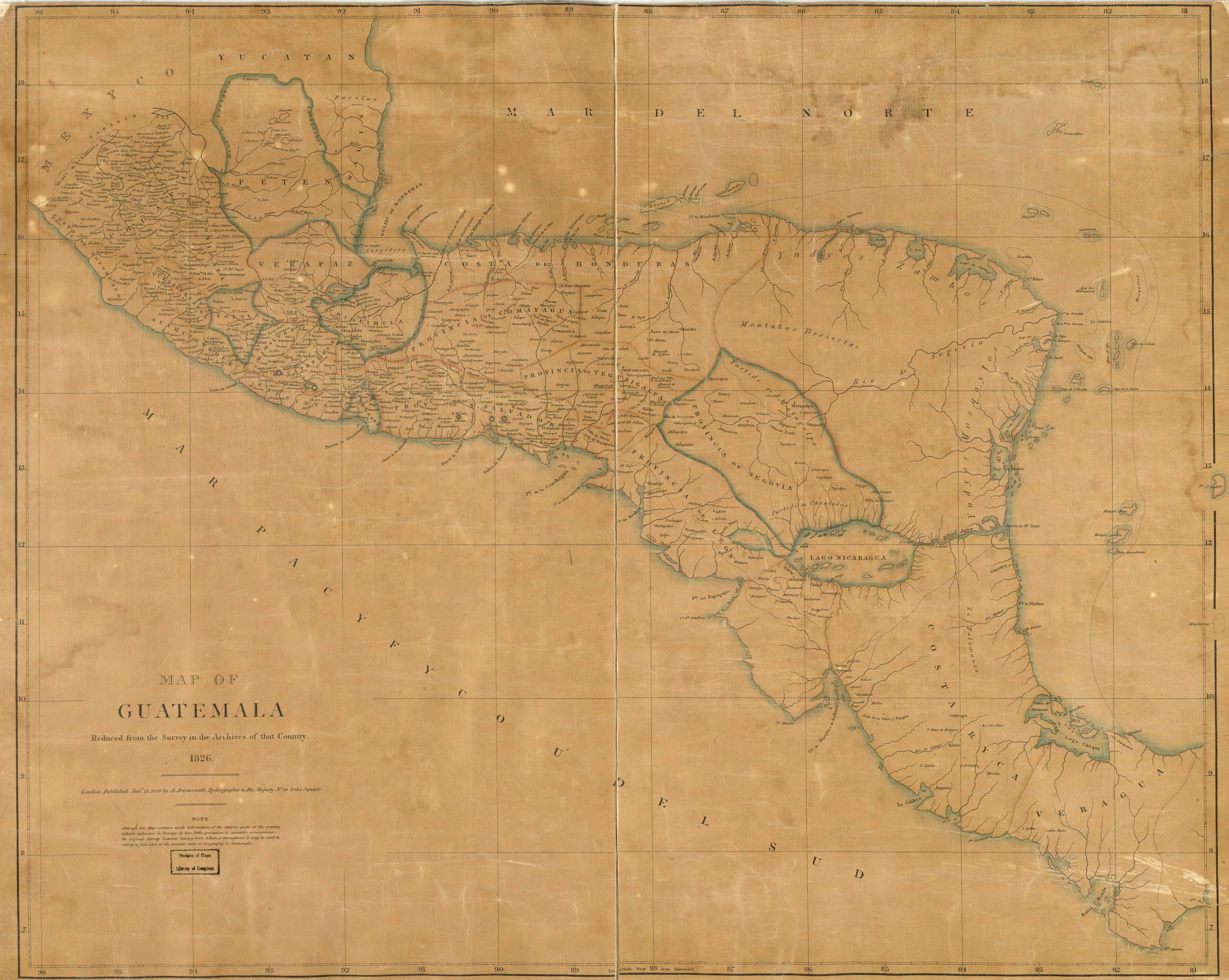
An 1826 map of the Federal Republic of Central America

Central America, at the time known as the Captaincy General of Guatemala (consisting of Costa Rica, El Salvador, Guatemala, Honduras, and Nicaragua), attempted to gain its independence from the Spanish Empire during the Spanish American wars of independence. In 1811, intellectuals in San Salvador led by General Manuel José Arce and priest José Matías Delgado launched a rebellion against colonial intendant Antonio Gutiérrez y Ulloa, but Spanish forces led by José Alejandro de Aycinena suppressed the rebellion. In 1813 and 1814, more rebellions occurred in the Nicaraguan cities of Granada and León, in Guatemala City, and again in San Salvador, but all were suppressed by the Spanish.

On 15 September 1821, the Captaincy General of Guatemala declared its independence from the Spanish Empire. Central American independence was bloodlessly attainted by the region's criollo elite "to prevent the consequences that would be fearful in the event that the people should proclaim it". Central America was briefly annexed by the First Mexican Empire from 1822 to 1823 before regaining its independence after Mexican emperor Agustín de Iturbide was deposed. On 1 July 1823, the National Constituent Assembly of Central America proclaimed the establishment of the United Provinces of Central America, later renamed to the Federal Republic of Central America in 1824 when its constitution was adopted.

=== Liberal–conservative conflict ===
The two largest political factions in the Federal Republic of Central America were the liberals and the conservatives. (Note: Contemporary conservatives in the Federal Republic of Central America referred to themselves as "moderates" instead of conservatives.) The liberals and conservatives were not organized political party but rather functioned as factions. Liberals supported foreign investments, laissez-faire economics, and the separation of church and state. Meanwhile, conservatives supported protectionism, maintaining the Catholic Church's influence in society, and maintaining the political status quo. Furthermore, the liberals promoted federalism and states' rights while the conservatives supported centralization and a strong federal government. They viewed each other as enemies and accused the other of "demagoguery, disorganization, and anarchism" ("demagogia, desorganización y anarquismo").

Arce, a liberal, defeated conservative José Cecilio del Valle in the 1825 presidential election and was inaugurated as President of Central America on 29 April 1825. Arce won after seven conservatives in the Federal Congress voted for him instead of for del Valle leading to some believing that Arce had formed a secret agreement with the conservatives. Guatemalan historian Alejandro Marure theorized that the conservatives elected Arce over del Valle as Arce was supposedly more likely to acknowledge legislative supremacy than del Valle. Liberal José Francisco Barrundia refused to become Arce's vice president, and liberals Mariano Gálvez and Pedro Molina Mazariegos refused cabinet appointments. These positions were instead filled with conservatives.

Amidst a conflict between the liberal government of Guatemala opposed the conservative-controlled Federal Congress, Arce initially attempted to remain neutral. The liberals viewed Arce's neutrality as a betrayal. In June 1825, liberal Guatemalan politicians refused to attend a ceremony commemorating the 2-year-anniversary of the National Constitution Assembly's establishment as places of honor were reserved for federal government officials. Arce—at the instruction of the Federal Congress—sent federal soldiers to Guatemala to force protesting politicians to attend as their attendance was required by federal law. Juan Barrundia, Guatemala's governor, threatened to raise an army to "contain the despotism of a tyrant (Arce)", after which, the Federal Congress appeased Guatemalan officials by providing the state government offices inside a federal building in Guatemala City; at the time, the state government lacked any offices in Guatemala City after moving the state capital from Antigua Guatemala.

== Course of the civil war ==
=== 1826 ===
==== Los Altos campaign ====
In 1826, the Guatemalan government stopped making payments to the federal government in protest of it bearing most of the federal republic's finances. When Arce was forming a federal army loyal to him, Juan Barrundia accused him of illegally arresting Guatemalans and arrested a federal military officer. In response, Arce had Juan Barrundia arrested on 6 September 1826, marking the beginning of the First Central American Civil War. Cirilo Flores Estrada became acting governor after Juan Barrundia's arrest. That month, federal troops commanded by Colonel Manuel Montúfar y Coronado marched from Guatemala City to Antigua Guatemala, Retalhuleu, and Tapachula.

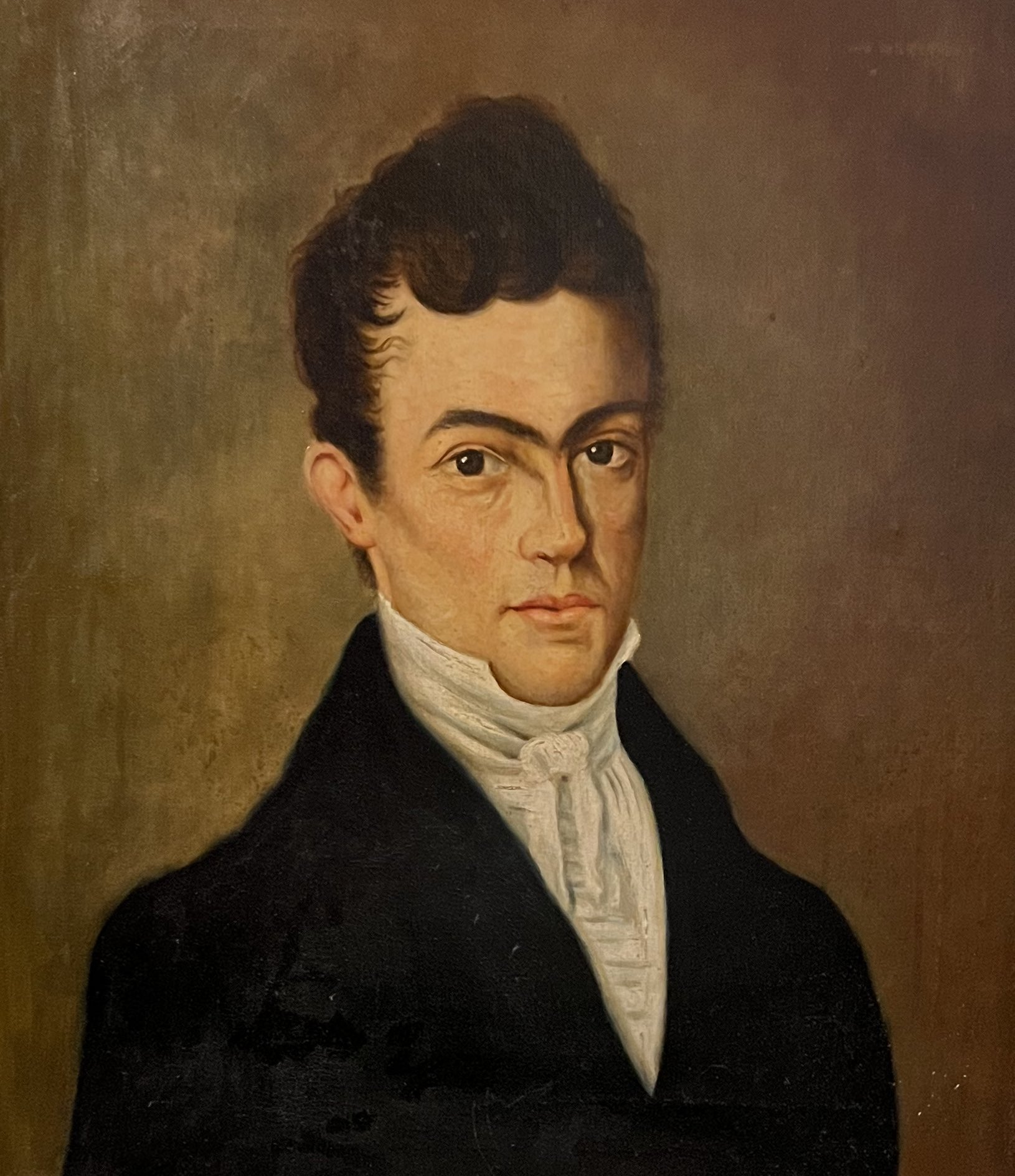
Mariano de Aycinena y Piñol, the conservative governor of Guatemala during the civil war

In October, a division federal troops commanded by Brigadier Francisco Cáscaras marched towards Quetzaltenango tasked with suppressing Flores' government. There, Flores was killed on 13 October by an Indigenous mob for his liberal and anti-clerical views. On 18 October, Cáscaras' troops fought Guatemalan troops commanded by Colonel José Pierzon at the Battle of Salcajá resulting in 40 deaths and a Guatemalan victory. They clashed again on 28 October at the Battle of Malacatán where 12 soldiers were killed and 5 more were wounded. The second battle was a federal victory. The success of the federal Los Altos campaign resulted in Arce's government asserting full control of Guatemala and he later appointed conservative Mariano de Aycinena y Piñol as Guatemala's governor.

==== Federal self-coup ====
On 10 October 1826, Arce issued a decree that dissolved the Federal Congress. He effectively staged a self-coup as the decree was illegal; he did not have the power to dissolve the Federal Congress. This was rejected by the Honduran head of state, Dionisio de Herrera, but Arce did not recognize Herrera's authority, claiming that Herrera's provisional mandate had expired and that he was in power illegitimately. The Federal Congress had called for new elections in Honduras, but Herrera ignored the decree and remained in power. For these reasons but under the guise of protecting Copán's tobacco plantations owned by the federal government, Arce decided to oust Herrera.

On 1 November 1826, liberal Salvadoran governor Juan Vicente Villacorta (who sent 300 soldiers to support federal forces in the Los Altos campaign) resigned and was succeeded by Mariano Prado, a liberal opponent to Arce. On 6 December, Prado "[invited] the 'free' States" ("invita a los Estados «libres»") of Costa Rica, Honduras, and Nicaragua to send representatives to El Salvador to "reestablish constitutional order in the Republic" ("restablezca en la República el orden constitucional"). He also called on federal legislators to meet in the Salvadoran city of Ahuachapán instead of Guatemala City, supposedly to prevent provincial politics from influencing their work; he wanted to restrict Guatemala's influence on the federal government. Honduras and Nicaragua accepted Prado's call in December 1826 while Costa Rica followed in April 1827.

=== 1827 ===
In February 1827, Arce temporarily gave presidential powers to Vice President Mariano Beltranena y Llano and marched federal troops to Ahuachapán and Santa Ana to suppress Prado. On 20 March, the Legislative Assembly of El Salvador issued a declaration that withdrew recognition of Arce's presidential authority. Salvadoran soldiers invaded Guatemala and clashed with federal troops personally led by Arce in Arrazola on the outskirts of Guatemala City on 23 March. The battle resulted in a federal victory. After this defeat, Prado built fortifications in San Salvador, El Salvador's capital city.

Herrera was appointed as Head of State of Honduras by the National Constituent Assembly on 16 September 1824. According to the 1825 constitution of Honduras, his mandate would end after three years on 16 September 1827. Arce ordered General José Justo Milla, Herrera's former deputy, to overthrow Herrera in 1827.

On 4 April 1827, Milla prepared for the attack on the city of Comayagua with 200 men, while General Francisco Morazán led the defense troops of the besieged city. Milla ordered the advance and relentlessly faced the Honduran troops under intense fire. The contest ended with the victory of Milla's forces who proceeded to burn down the capital. Herrera was taken prisoner on 9 May and was sent to Guatemala. Milla took control of the city while Morazán managed to leave the capital with Colonel Remigio Díaz and Colonel José Antonio Márquez, arriving in Tegucigalpa, there he is reinforced with 300 men and his intentions are to return to the Comayagua Valley, but at the height of Villa de San Antonio, was attacked by an advance troop under the command of Colonel Hernández and Captain Rosa Medina. Morazán took a defensive position at the La Maradiaga hacienda. In battle on 29 April, Hernández and his invading forces were defeated. Morazán returned to Tegucigalpa to strengthen himself further.

Francisco Morazán, with a safe-conduct, went to Choluteca in southern Honduras, where he met his family in Ojojona but was taken prisoner by the commander of arms of Tegucigalpa. He left on bail some 23 days later and was forced to flee to El Salvador on 28 July 1827, with intentions on fleeing to Mexico. He then moved to León, Nicaragua on 15 September 1827, where his friend General José Anacleto Ordóñez provided him with 135 men to recapture Comayagua. Salvadoran soldiers were then added to the command of Colonel José Zepeda.

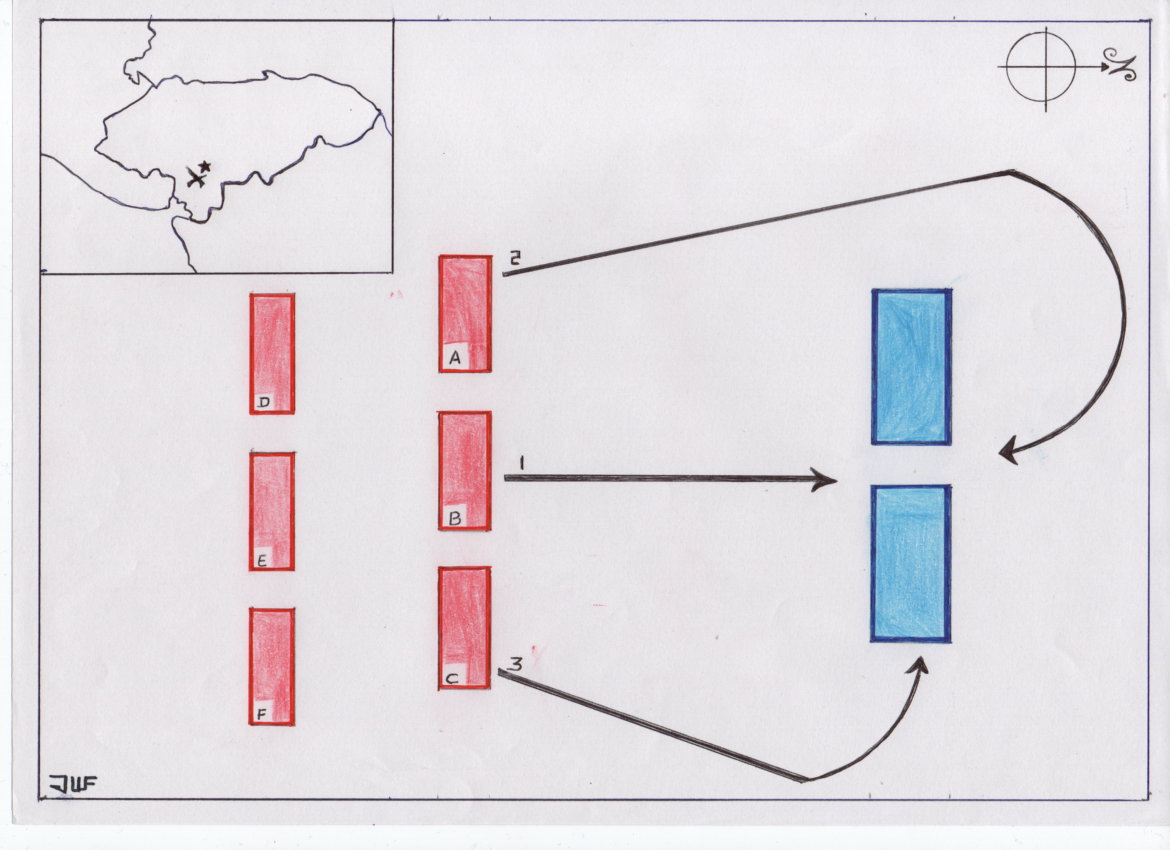
Troop movements of the Battle of La Trinidad; Morazán's forces are in red and Arce's forces are in blue.

In October 1827, Morazán entered Choluteca where Márquez awaited him with a division of men to join the liberating cause. The first Honduran town they arrived in was San Antonio de Texiguat. The town offered Morazán support with weapons and men.

Milla discovered the Morazán's presence in southern Honduras and quickly moved with his troops to Tegucigalpa, where he established his command headquarters. Morazán went to the town of Sabanagrande to prepare for a decisive fight in the Valle de la Trinidad.

At 9 a.m. on 11 November 1827, the first movement of maneuvers was carried out by Colonel Ramón Pacheco. He positioned himself to defend the Avenue that leads from Ojojona to the Valle de la Trinidad. He then attacked Milla's center line. Under the command of Colonel Remigio Díaz, a detachment of 150 men moved along the bank of the Sicatacaro ravine, headed northwest, from Ojojona to Valle la Trinidad and attacked the enemy rear. Morazán, together with Colonel Román Valladares, surrounded the Caranguije hill and attacked the right flank of the federal forces.

The combat intensified for five hours, at 3:00 p.m. the federal troops of Milla were crushed by the men under the command of Morazán. The defeated Milla and some of his surviving officers fled the battlefield, leaving documents, trunks, and other supplies. There were forty casualties between wounded and dead. The reservist force allied under the command of Colonel José María Gutiérrez Osejo and Captain Francisco Ferrera took no further action to pursue Milla. After this victory, Morazán marched to Tegucigalpa to recapture it on 12 November. On 26 November, he arrived at the capital Comayagua where he made his triumphal entry and occupied the headquarters of the State of Honduras which was interim chaired by Miguel Eusebio Bustamante. Morazán installed a new government in Honduras by appointing himself as Head of State of Honduras.

After his victory in La Trinidad, Morazán emerged as the leader of the liberal movement and became recognized for his military skills throughout the Federal Republic of Central America. Morazán received calls for help from liberals in El Salvador. Salvadorans opposed the new conservative congressmen and other government officials elected by the decree issued on 10 October 1826. Salvadorans demanded the restitution of former political leaders, but Arce argued that this measure was necessary to restore constitutional order.

After the battle, Arce ordered two thousand federal troops under the command of General Manuel Arzú to occupy El Salvador. Meanwhile in Honduras, Morazán began preparing to recapture El Salvador. He resigned as Head of State of Honduras and has Diego Vigil y Cocaña replace him. He went to Texiguat where he prepared and organized his troops for the Salvadoran campaign.

=== 1828 ===
In April 1828, Morazán went to El Salvador with a force of 1,400 men. This group of militants, known as the Protective Allied Army of the Law, was made up of small groups of Hondurans, Nicaraguans, and Salvadorans who contributed their own tools of war, others with the support of the Indigenous people who served as infantry. Some volunteers followed their liberal convictions, others worked for a political leader, others simply hoped to earn something for their efforts after the war ended. This was the combination of forces that joined Morazán in his fight against federal troops.

While the Salvadoran army faced off against federal forces in San Salvador, Morazán settled in the eastern part of the state. On 6 July, Morazán defeated Colonel Vicente Domínguez's troops at the El Gualcho ranch.

Morazán kept fighting around San Miguel defeating every platoon sent by Arzú from San Salvador. The defeats convinced Arzú to leave Montúfar in charge of San Salvador and to personally deal with Morazán. When the liberal caudillo became aware of Arzú's movements, he left for Honduras to recruit more troops. On 20 September 20, Arzú was near the Lempa River with five hundred men in search of Morazán when he learned that his forces had capitulated in Mejicanos and San Salvador.

Meanwhile, Morazán returned to El Salvador with a respectable army. Arzú, fighting illness, fled back to Guatemala, leaving his troops under the command of Lieutenant Colonel Antonio de Aycinena. The colonel and his troops were marching towards Honduran territory when they were intercepted by Morazán's men in San Antonio. On 9 October, Aycinena was forced to surrender. With the capitulation of San Antonio, El Salvador was finally free of federal troops. On 23 October, Morazán made his triumphal entry into the San Salvador Plaza. A few days later, he marched in Ahuachapán, to organize the army with goal of overthrowing conservative aristocrats and ecclesiastics from power in Guatemalan territory and implanting a constitutional order to restore order to the federal republic.

On 20 October 1828, the government of Aycinena appointed Antonio José de Irisarri as Minister of War, with the rank of colonel, to restore discipline in the ranks of the Guatemalan Army. Irisarri was taken prisoner and was only saved from execution when a soldier pleaded for his life; He was sent on foot to San Salvador bound by arms, where he was imprisoned for nine months.

Upon learning Irisarri's capture, Aycinena attempted to negotiate with Morazán. As he was determined to end the hegemony of the aristocrats and ecclesiastics Guatemalans, Morazán did not accept any deal.

=== 1829 ===
In Ahuachapán, Morazán did everything possible to organize a large army. He asked the government of El Salvador to provide him with 4,000 men, but he had to settle for 2,000. When he was in a position to act in early 1829, he sent a division under Colonel Juan Prem to enter Guatemalan territory and take control of Chiquimula. The order was carried out by Prem despite resistance offered by the enemy. Soon after, Morazán moved a small force near Guatemala City to force the enemy out of its trenches and cause the desertion of its troops. Meanwhile, Domínguez, who had left Guatemala City with six hundred foot soldiers to attack Prem, learned of the small force that was near Guatemala City. Domínguez changed his plans and went after the small force. This opportunity was seized by Prem who moved from Zacapa and then attacked Domínguez's forces, defeating them on 15 January 1829. After these events, Morazán ordered Prem to continue his march with the 1,400 men under his command and occupy the post of San José Pinula, near the Guatemalan capital.

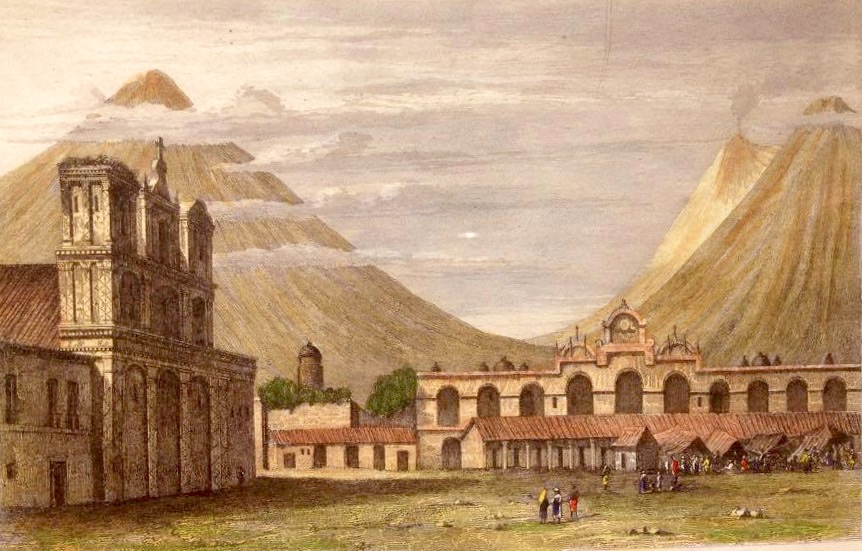
The Central Square of Antigua Guatemala

Meanwhile, the people of Antigua Guatemala organized against the conservative government of Aycinena in Guatemala and put the department of Sacatepéquez under the protection of Morazán. The allegiance of Sacatepéquez hastened Morazán's invasion into Guatemala. He placed his men in the town of San José Pinula near Guatemala City. Military operations in the capital began with small skirmishes in front of the government fortifications. On 15 February, one of the largest divisions of Morazán's army, under the command of Cayetano de la Cerda, was defeated in Mixco by federal troops. Due to this defeat, Morazán lifted the siege of the city and concentrated its forces in Antigua. A division of federal troops followed him from the capital under the command of Pacheco in the direction of Sumpango in Sacatepéquez and El Tejar in Chimaltenango with the purpose of attacking him in Antigua Guatemala. But Pacheco extended his forces, leaving some of them in Sumpango. When he arrived in San Miguelito on March 6 with a smaller army, he was defeated by Morazán, which once again raised the morale of the men of the liberal leader.

After San Miguelito's victory, Morazán's army increased in numbers when Guatemalan volunteers joined its ranks. On 15 March, when Morazán and his army were on their way to occupy their previous positions, he was intercepted by Colonel Prado's federal troops at the Las Charcas ranch. Morazán, in a superior position, crushed Prado's army. The battlefield was strewn with corpses, and the Allies took numerous prisoners and seized a considerable number of weapons. Subsequently, Morazán mobilized to regain his former positions in San José Pinula and El Aceituno, and again began a siege on Guatemala City. General Verveer tried to mediate between the State Government and Morazán, but they could not reach an agreement. Military operations continued with great success for the Allied Army.

To prepare the defense of the city and threatened by the troops of Morazán, Aycinena ordered on 18 March 1829 that the death penalty would be applied to everyone who aided the enemy. He made a proclamation invoking the defense of sanctity of the altars and issued a legal provision by which liberal leaders Molina Mazariegos, his son, Esteban Molina, Antonio Rivera Cabezas, and military leaders Ordóñez, Nicolás Raoul, and Isidoro Saget were declared enemies of the state.

On 12 April, Aycinena capitulated. The next day, the Plaza Central was occupied by Morazán's troops.

== Casualties ==
According to Colombian general José Francisco Córdova, a combined 15,000 civilians and military personnel were killed during the civil war. Guatemalan historian Alejandro Marure lists the total military deaths at 2,748 killed in action. Of the military personnel killed, 1,694 were Salvadorans; 501 were Guatemalans; 375 were Nicaraguans; and 125 were Hondurans. The allegiance of the remaining 53 fatalities is unknown. An additional 819 military personnel were wounded. Mexican historian Arturo Taracena Arriola notes that an uncounted number of deserters may have been murdered by civilians, a practice that was common in Central America at the time.

== Aftermath ==
"Each belligerent State reassumed sovereign power within itself, and the sovereign of this City (Guatemala) was reduced to a vain simulacrum. [...] The States have just triumphed and believed, as was natural, that they should give the law and have everything, as they had conquered." (Note: In Spanish: "Cada Estado de los beligerantes reasumió en sí un poder soberano, y el soberano de esta Ciudad (Guatemala) fue reducido a un vano simulacro. [...] Los Estados acababan de triunfar y creían, como era natural, que debían dar la ley y disponer de todo, como lo habían conquistado.")

— Federal Congress of Central America, 1829

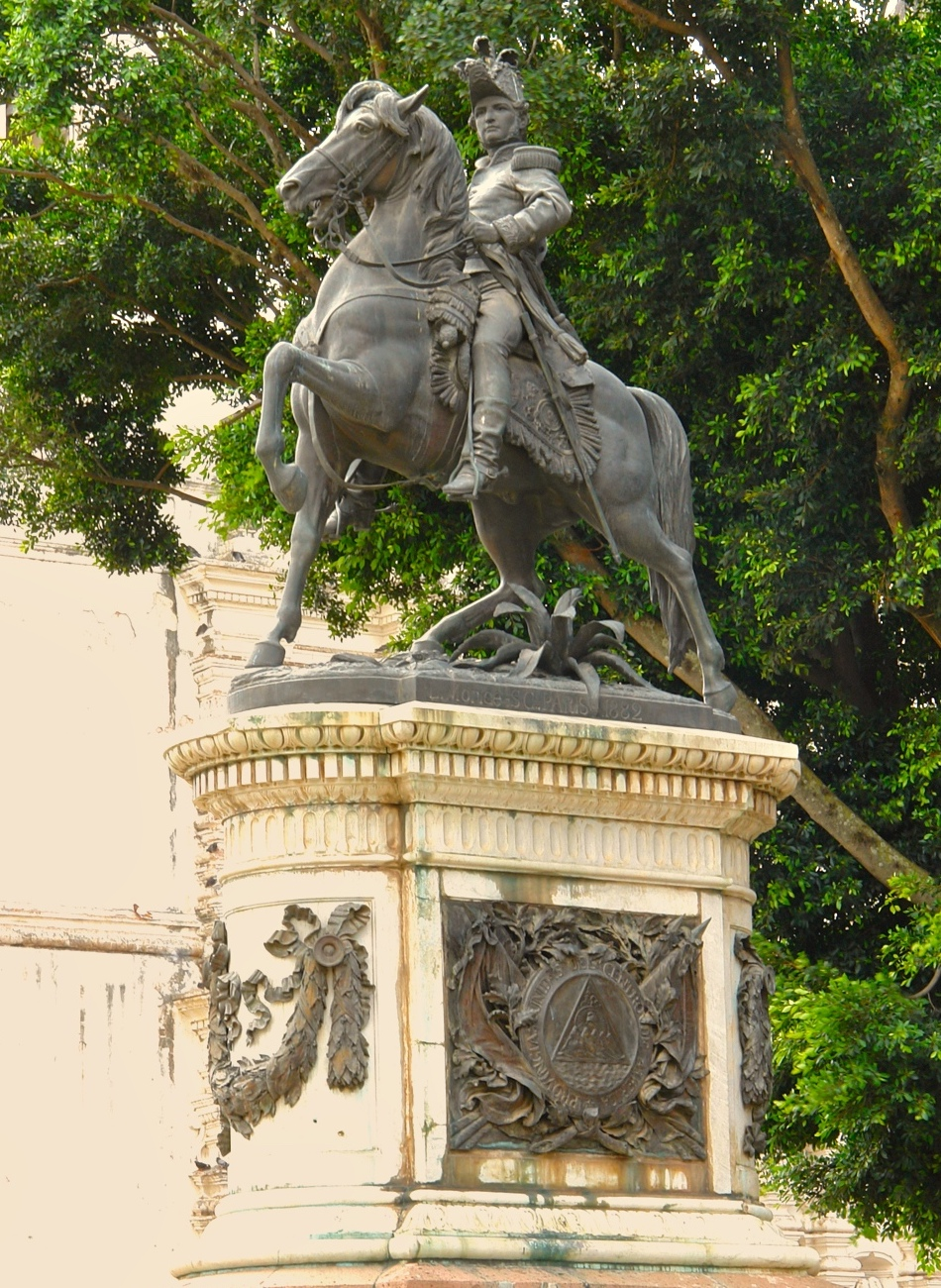
An statute of Francisco Morazán in Tegucigalpa, Honduras

Immediately after the surrender of Guatemala City on 13 April, Arce, Mariano Aycinena, Mariano Beltranena y Llano, and all the officials who had had a role in the war, were imprisoned. After these events, Morazán led Central America for three months until 26 June 1829 until the Federal Congress appointed Juan Barrundia as President of Central America. Morazán expelled Aycinena and Piñol, Guatemalan conservative aristocrats, and most of the members of the Aycinena Clan that he directed, along with his allies, members of the main regular orders, and senior clergy of the Catholic Church. Not content with the expulsions, he confiscated all their property.

On 4 June 1829, the Morazán government issued a law imposing the death penalty on all members of the Aycinena Clan who participated in Guatemala's conservative government, including Irisarri, prior to the return to the treasury of the wages from his three years of work and the confiscation of all his property. Irisarri escaped from the Salvadoran prison on 7 January 1830 and embarked from Acajutla for Guayaquil, Ecuador where he took refuge.

== See also ==
- History of Central America
- Second Central American Civil War (1838–1840)
