= Republic of Central America =

Republic of Central America may refer to:

- Federal Republic of Central America (1823–1839/1841), between Chiapas, Costa Rica, El Salvador, Guatemala, Honduras, and Nicaragua
- Confederation of Central America (1842–1845), between El Salvador, Guatemala, Costa Rica, Honduras, and Nicaragua
- Republic of Central America (1852–1854), between El Salvador, Honduras, and Nicaragua
- Republic of Central America (1889)
- Greater Republic of Central America (1895–1898), between El Salvador, Honduras, and Nicaragua
- Federation of Central America (1921–1922), between El Salvador, Guatemala, and Honduras

== See also ==
- Federal Republic of Central America–United States relations
- Greater Republic of Central America–United States relations
