= Juan Espinosa =

Juan Espinosa may refer to:

- Juan de Espinosa, Spanish Baroque painter
- Juan Espinosa (politician), Nicaraguan politician
- Juan Pablo Espinosa, Colombian actor
- Juan Javier Espinosa, president of Ecuador
- Juan Espinosa (field hockey), see 2010 Men's Hockey World Cup squads § Argentina

== See also ==
- Juan Espinoza (disambiguation)
