= Federal Republic of Central America–United States relations =

- Central America: United States

Relations between the Federal Republic of Central America, also known as the Central American Federation, and the United States were formally established in 1824 following the Federation's independence from Spain. Relations lasted until 1841 when the Federation dissolved and relations with the United States continued among the newly independent former member states of Costa Rica, El Salvador, Guatemala, Honduras, and Nicaragua.

== History ==
The United States recognized the Central American Federation following its independence from Spain on August 4, 1824. Recognition was given when President James Monroe received Antonio José Cañas, the founder of the Central American Federation, as Envoy Extraordinary and Minister Plenipotentiary.

On December 5, 1825, the Federation and the United States signed the Treaty of Peace, Amity, Commerce, and Navigation. The treaty was signed in Washington, D.C. by Secretary of State Henry Clay and Central American ambassador Antonio José Cañas. The treaty was ratified by both countries and it entered into force on August 2, 1826, when ratifications were exchanged in Guatemala City. Following the Federation's collapse in 1847, the treaty lost legal force.

In 1826, a legation office for the United States was established in Guatemala City. On May 3, John Williams presented his credentials after he was appointed Chargé d’Affaires by President John Quincy Adams. Today, the legation office is the current U.S. embassy to Guatemala.

The treaty increased revenue for the Federation whose economy was drastically poor. The United States not only was the largest trading partner of the Federation but also its biggest subsidizer. Prior to the signing of the treaty, trade with the U.S. amounted to $700,000 yearly, including $200,000 in smuggled goods due to customs inspection conducted in fraudulent manners. John Williams would assist the Federation in helping its economy grow. Williams opposed implementing an increase in tariffs calling it an "injustice". To help with agriculture, agricultural implements were admitted duty-free with funds sent to Europe to purchase the knowledge and machinery.

With the outbreak of the First Central American Civil War and Second Central American Civil War, the Federation was beginning to collapse and inevitably it did during the Second Civil War from 1838 to 1840. William Sumter Murphy was appointed as ambassador to the Federation under the title of Special and Confidential Agent of the United States to Central America. Murphy did not formally leave his post as ambassador until March 1842. And during the period from April 1844 to April 1853 began recognizing and establishing formal relations with the successor states of Costa Rica, El Salvador, Guatemala, Honduras, and Nicaragua. The Federation formally dissolved in 1841 ending relations between the two states.

== See also ==
- Foreign relations of the United States
- Costa Rica–United States relations
- El Salvador–United States relations
- Guatemala–United States relations
- Honduras–United States relations
- Nicaragua–United States relations
- Greater Republic of Central America–United States relations
- Latin America–United States relations
