= Central American Republic =

Central American Republic may refer to:

- Federal Republic of Central America, 1823–1839/1841 state encompassing modern-day Guatemala, El Salvador, Honduras, Nicaragua, Costa Rica, and Chiapas, Mexico
- Greater Republic of Central America, 1896–1898 political union between El Salvador, Honduras, and Nicaragua

== See also ==
- Federal Republic of Central America–United States relations
- Greater Republic of Central America–United States relations
