= 1827 Honduran coup d'état =

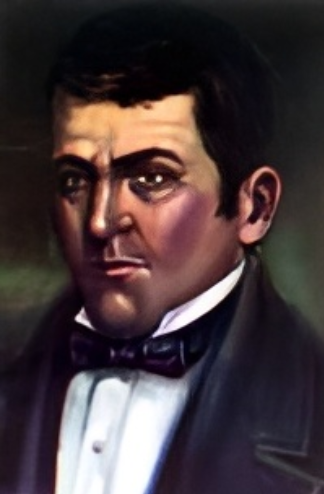
Dionisio de Herrera, who was overthrown in the coup d'état

The 1827 Honduran coup d'état was a military takeover of the Honduran government under Dionisio de Herrera, initiated on April 4 by the then Lieutenant General José Justo Milla.

The first constitution of Honduras, dated 11 December 1825, established four-year terms for the head of state, with Herrera's initial term to end on 16 September 1827. He was however unable to finish his term due to the coup d'état. The assembly took the position that his position was provisional.

== Background ==
Dionisio de Herrera was appointed governor of the province of Tegucigalpa on 23 March 1823. The first Congress of Honduras, a constituent assembly convened on 16 September 1824, and effected the union of Comayagua and Tegucigalpa, declaring them alternate capitals of Honduras, and chose Dionisio de Herrera as First Chief of the State of Honduras, with Lieutenant General José Justo Milla as his deputy. At the time Honduras was part of the short-lived Federal Republic of Central America, established in 1823.

The president of the Federal Republic of Central America, Manuel José Arce, opposed Herrera and the Liberal Party of Honduras. In October 1826 Arce dissolved Congress and the Senate, trying establish a centralist or unitary system, allying himself with the conservatives, by which he lost the support of his own party, the liberals. This brought him into conflict with both the federal government and the states, denounced by Herrera and Mariano Prado, Chief of State of El Salvador. On 1 November 1826 Herrera was attacked in his house; hired men fired from the street into his bedroom.

In December 1826 the conservative priest José Nicolás Irías Midence excommunicated Herrera, claiming that he was influenced by freemasons and heretics.

== Coup d'état ==
Arce called on the Honduran Army commanded by the deputy chief of state, José Justo Milla Pineda, to support Irías. On 4 April 1827 the siege of Comayagua began. On 10 May, after 36 days, the city was given up by the military chief Fernández.

== Aftermath ==
Herrera was taken prisoner May 9, and sent to Guatemala, where he remained in prison for two years.

On 15 March 1829 General Francisco Morazán and his army were intercepted by the federal troops of Colonel Prado in Las Charcas. Morazán held a superior position and crushed Prado's army. Later, Morazán moved to recover his former positions in Pínula and Aceytuno, putting him once more in control of Guatemala City, where he finally freed Herrera.

== See also ==
- Dionisio de Herrera
- Francisco Morazán
- José Justo Milla
- 1963 Honduran coup d'état
- 2009 Honduran coup d'état
