= Battle of San Salvador =

Battle of San Salvador can refer to:

- Battle of San Salvador (1822)
- Battle of San Salvador (1823)
