= Greater Republic of Central America–United States relations =

- Central America: United States

Relations between the Greater Republic of Central America, also known as the United Provinces of Central America, and the United States were formally established in 1896 following El Salvador, Honduras, and Nicaragua agreeing to form a union similar to the former Federal Republic of Central America. Relations lasted until 1898 when the Great Republic dissolved and relations with the United States continued with the individual states of El Salvador, Honduras, and Nicaragua.

== History ==
After the collapse of the Federal Republic of Central America in 1841 due to the first and second Central American Civil War's, three of the former member states of the Federal Republic of Central America, El Salvador, Honduras, and Nicaragua agreed to form the Greater Republic of Central America with the signing of the Treaty of Amapala on 25 June 1895.

Prior to the signing of the Treaty of Ampala, in the late 1880s, Guatemalan President Manuel Barillas pushed the idea in Guatemala and neighboring El Salvador and Honduras to recreate a Central American union like the long-dissolved Federal Republic of Central America. The pressure resulted in the nations of Guatemala, El Salvador, Honduras, and Nicaragua signing a treaty in San Salvador on 15 October 1889 which proclaimed the Republic of Central America. The republic was set to be established on 15 September 1890, to coincide with the date of independence of the original Federal Republic. On 22 June 1890, however, Salvadoran President Francisco Menéndez was assassinated and his successor, Carlos Ezeta, pulled out of the treaty, effectively killing the union before it was even formed. Guatemala refused to recognize Ezeta's presidency and declared war on El Salvador on 27 June 1890. The United States sent warships to the coasts of El Salvador and Guatemala to protect American interests in both countries and put pressure on both governments to end the war which the two agreed to do so on 21 August 1890. The treaty was signed by the five nations of Central America and legitimized Ezeta's government.

The United States formally recognized the Republic on 24 December 1896, with President Grover Cleveland noting the responsibilities toward the individual republics were" wholly unaffected." The United States was represented by a legation office in San José, Costa Rica which today is the American Embassy to Costa Rica. A legation office represented the Greater Republic in Washington, D.C.

On 29 November 1898, the Greater Republic of Central America was dissolved and the individual member states promptly resumed independent diplomatic relations with the United States. The U.S. was informed of the Republic's dissolution in a letter that arrived on 5 December.

== See also ==
- Foreign relations of the United States
- El Salvador–United States relations
- Honduras–United States relations
- Nicaragua–United States relations
- Federal Republic of Central America–United States relations
- Latin America–United States relations
