= France national football team all-time record =

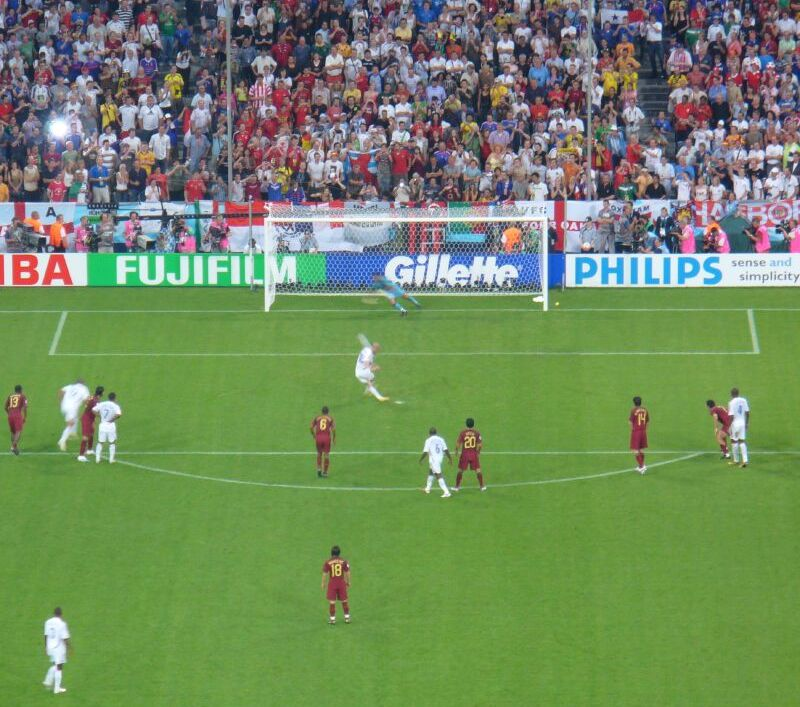
France contesting a match against Portugal at the 2006 FIFA World Cup.

The list shown below shows the France national football team all-time international record against opposing nations. The stats are composed of FIFA World Cup, UEFA European Championship, UEFA Nations League, FIFA Confederations Cup, and Summer Olympics matches, as well as numerous international friendly tournaments and matches. (Note: A non-senior, young France team played at 1984 Summer Olympics, which they won. Since 1992 Summer Olympics, only under-23 teams are allowed to compete in the tournament. Thus, France's Summer Olympics matches, since the 1984 Games, will not be counted on this list.)

The France national football team represents the nation of France in international football. It is fielded by the French Football Federation and competes as a member of UEFA. The team played its first official match on 1 May 1904 against Belgium. France and Belgium have since contested 75 official matches against each other, the most all-time between each team. Aside from Belgium, France have contested matches against almost 90 other national teams. Of the 90 teams, France have not lost to 40 of them having earned a perfect winning percentage against 26 of the teams. With France winning 3-1 against Senegal during the 2026 FIFA World Cup, the Ireland national team from 1882 to 1950 is now the only team that France has not beaten. France has contested this team only once.

== Competition records ==
=== FIFA World Cup record ===
Year	Result	Position	GP	W	D*	L	GS	GA
(Uruguay) 1930	Group stage	7th	3	1	0	2	4	3
(Italy) 1934	First round	9th	1	0	0	1	2	3
(France) 1938	Quarter-finals	6th	2	1	0	1	4	4
(Brazil) 1950	did not qualify							
(Switzerland) 1954	Group stage	11th	2	1	0	1	3	3
(Sweden) 1958	Third place	3rd	6	4	0	2	23	15
(Chile) 1962	did not qualify							
(England) 1966	Group stage	13th	3	0	1	2	2	5
(Mexico) 1970	did not qualify							
(West Germany) 1974	did not qualify							
(Argentina) 1978	Group stage	12th	3	1	0	2	5	5
(Spain) 1982	Fourth place	4th	7	3	2	2	16	12
(Mexico) 1986	Third place	3rd	7	4	2	1	12	6
(Italy) 1990	did not qualify							
(United States) 1994	did not qualify							
(France) 1998	Champions	1st	7	6	1	0	15	2
(South Korea) (Japan) 2002	Group stage	28th	3	0	1	2	0	3
(Germany) 2006	Runners-up	2nd	7	4	3	0	9	3
(South Africa) 2010	Group stage	29th	3	0	1	2	1	4
(Brazil) 2014	Quarter-finals	7th	5	3	1	1	10	3
(Russia) 2018	Champions	1st	7	6	1	0	14	6
(Qatar) 2022	Runners-up	2nd	7	5	1	1	16	8
(Canada) (Mexico) (United States) 2026	Fourth place	4th	8	6	0	2	20	10
Total	17/23	2 Titles	81	45	14	22	156	95

=== UEFA European Championship record ===
Year	Result	Position	GP	W	D*	L	GS	GA
(France) 1960	Fourth place	4th	2	0	0	2	4	7
(Spain) 1964	did not qualify							
(Italy) 1968	did not qualify							
(Belgium) 1972	did not qualify							
(Socialist Federal Republic of Yugoslavia) 1976	did not qualify							
(Italy) 1980	did not qualify							
(France) 1984	Champions	1st	5	5	0	0	14	4
(West Germany) 1988	did not qualify							
(Sweden) 1992	Group stage	6th	3	0	2	1	2	3
(England) 1996	Semi-finals	4th	5	2	3	0	5	2
(Belgium) (Netherlands) 2000	Champions	1st	6	5	0	1	13	7
(Portugal) 2004	Quarter-finals	5th	4	2	1	1	7	5
(Austria) (Switzerland) 2008	Group stage	15th	3	0	1	2	1	6
(Poland) (Ukraine) 2012	Quarter-finals	8th	4	1	1	2	3	5
(France) 2016	Runners-up	2nd	7	5	1	1	13	5
(Europe) 2020	Round of 16	11th	4	1	3	0	7	6
(Germany) 2024	Semi-finals	4th	6	2	3	1	4	3
Total	11/17	2 Titles	49	23	15	11	73	53

=== UEFA Nations League record ===
UEFA Nations League record
League phase												Finals								
Season	LG	GP	Pos	Pld	W	D	L	GF	GA	P/R	RK	Year	Pos	Pld	W	D*	L	GF	GA	Squad
2018–19	A	1	2nd	4	2	1	1	4	4	Same position	6th	(Portugal) 2019	did not qualify							
2020–21	A	3	1st	6	5	1	0	12	5	Same position	1st	(Italy) 2021	1st	2	2	0	0	5	3	Squad
2022–23	A	1	3rd	6	1	2	3	5	7	Same position	12th	(Netherlands) 2023	did not qualify							
2024–25	A	2	1st	8	5	1	2	14	8	Same position	3rd	(Germany) 2025	3rd	2	1	0	1	6	5	Squad
Total				24	13	5	6	35	24	1st		Total		4	3	0	1	11	8	1 Title

*Draws include knockout matches decided on penalty kicks.
**Group stage played home and away. Flag shown represents host nation for the finals stage.
**Red border indicates the finals stage will be held on home soil

=== FIFA Confederations Cup record ===
Year	Result	Position	GP	W	D*	L	GS	GA
(Saudi Arabia) 1992	did not qualify							
(Saudi Arabia) 1995	did not qualify							
(Saudi Arabia) 1997	did not qualify							
(Mexico) 1999	Withdrew							
(South Korea) (Japan) 2001	Champions	1st	5	4	0	1	12	2
(France) 2003	Champions	1st	5	5	0	0	12	3
(Germany) 2005	did not qualify							
(South Africa) 2009	did not qualify							
(Brazil) 2013	did not qualify							
(Russia) 2017	did not qualify							
Total	2/10	2 Titles	10	9	0	1	24	5

== Head-to-head record ==
Key
Positive balance (more Wins)
Neutral balance (Wins = Losses)
Negative balance (more Losses)

Updated as of France vs. Italy on 12 November 2026.

Opponent	Played	Won	Drawn	Lost	Goals for	Goals against	Goal difference	% Won	Confederation
Albania	9	7	1	1	20	4	+16	77.78%	UEFA
Algeria	1	1	0	0	4	1	+3	100%	CAF
Andorra	5	5	0	0	14	0	+14	100%	UEFA
Argentina	13	3	4	6	14	18	-4	23.08%	CONMEBOL
Armenia	5	5	0	0	14	2	+12	100%	UEFA
Australia	6	4	1	1	14	4	+10	66.67%	OFC/AFC
Austria	26	14	3	9	43	41	+2	53.85%	UEFA
Azerbaijan	4	4	0	0	18	1	+17	100%	UEFA
Belarus	6	3	2	1	10	6	+4	50%	UEFA
Belgium	80	31	19	30	141	164	-23	38.75%	UEFA
Bolivia	1	1	0	0	2	0	+2	100%	CONMEBOL
Bosnia and Herzegovina	6	3	3	0	8	4	+4	50%	UEFA
Brazil	16	6	4	6	20	25	-5	37.5%	CONMEBOL
Bulgaria	23	11	4	8	41	26	+15	47.83%	UEFA
CAF XI	1	1	0	0	2	0	+2	100%	CAF
Cameroon	3	2	1	0	5	3	+2	66.67%	CAF
Canada	2	1	1	0	1	0	+1	50%	CONCACAF
Chile	6	3	1	2	14	7	+7	50%	CONMEBOL
China	2	1	0	1	3	2	+1	50%	AFC
Colombia	5	4	0	1	10	6	+4	80%	CONMEBOL
CONCACAF XI	1	1	0	0	5	0	+5	100%	CONCACAF
Costa Rica	2	2	0	0	5	3	+2	100%	CONCACAF
Croatia	12	7	3	2	22	12	+10	58.33%	UEFA
Cyprus	8	7	1	0	27	2	+25	87.5%	UEFA
Czechoslovakia	20	7	4	9	29	34	-5	35%	UEFA
Czech Republic	4	1	2	1	4	5	-1	25%	UEFA
Denmark	19	9	2	8	23	42	-19	47.37%	UEFA
East Germany	7	2	2	3	8	7	+1	42.86%	UEFA
Ecuador	2	1	1	0	2	0	+2	50%	CONMEBOL
Egypt	1	1	0	0	5	0	+5	100%	CAF
England	35	11	6	18	49	81	-32	31.43%	UEFA
England Amateurs	8	1	0	7	4	61	-57	12.5%	UEFA
Estonia	1	1	0	0	4	0	+4	100%	UEFA
Faroe Islands	6	6	0	0	22	0	+22	100%	UEFA
FIFA XI	1	1	0	0	5	1	+4	100%	FIFA
Finland	11	10	0	1	22	5	+17	90.91%	UEFA
Georgia	4	3	1	0	7	1	+6	75%	UEFA
Germany	35	16	8	11	53	50	+3	45.71%	UEFA (including West Germany)
Greece	10	7	2	1	26	9	+17	70%	UEFA
Gibraltar	2	2	0	0	17	0	+17	100%	UEFA
Honduras	1	1	0	0	3	0	+3	100%	CONCACAF
Hungary	23	8	3	12	32	48	-16	34.78%	UEFA
Iceland	17	12	5	0	46	15	+31	70.59%	UEFA
Iran	1	1	0	0	2	1	+1	100%	AFC
Iraq	1	1	0	0	3	0	+3	100%	AFC
Ireland Amateurs	1	0	0	1	1	2	-1	0%	UEFA
Israel	11	5	5	1	19	7	+12	45.45%	UEFA
Italy	43	12	11	20	62	90	-29	27.91%	UEFA
Ivory Coast	4	2	1	1	6	3	+3	50%	CAF
Jamaica	1	1	0	0	8	0	+8	100%	CONCACAF
Japan	6	4	1	1	14	5	+9	66.67%	AFC
Kazakhstan	2	2	0	0	10	0	+10	100%	UEFA
Kuwait	2	2	0	0	5	1	+4	100%	AFC
Latvia	1	1	0	0	7	0	+7	100%	UEFA
Lithuania	4	4	0	0	5	0	+5	100%	UEFA
Luxembourg	19	17	1	1	74	12	+62	89.47%	UEFA
Malta	2	2	0	0	10	0	+10	100%	UEFA
Mexico	7	5	1	1	15	6	+9	71.43%	CONCACAF
Moldova	2	2	0	0	6	2	+4	100%	UEFA
Morocco	7	5	2	0	16	6	+10	71.43%	CAF
Netherlands	31	15	5	11	53	57	-4	48.39%	UEFA
New Zealand	1	1	0	0	5	0	+5	100%	OFC
Nigeria	2	1	0	1	2	1	+1	50%	CAF
Northern Ireland	9	6	3	0	21	5	+16	66.67%	UEFA
Norway	16	8	4	4	26	16	+10	50%	UEFA
Paraguay	6	4	2	0	15	4	+11	66.67%	CONMEBOL
Peru	2	1	0	1	1	1	0	50%	CONMEBOL
Poland	18	9	6	3	31	18	+13	50%	UEFA
Portugal	29	19	4	6	52	31	+21	65.52%	UEFA
Republic of Ireland	19	10	5	4	25	15	+10	52.63%	UEFA
Romania	16	8	5	3	21	16	+5	62.5%	UEFA
Russia	7	4	1	2	15	10	+5	57.14%	UEFA
Saudi Arabia	1	1	0	0	4	0	+4	100%	AFC
Scotland	17	9	0	8	27	16	+11	52.94%	UEFA
Senegal	2	1	0	1	3	2	+1	50%	CAF
Serbia	5	3	2	0	8	4	+4	60%	UEFA
Slovakia	4	2	1	1	6	2	+4	50%	UEFA
Slovenia	3	3	0	0	10	2	+8	100%	UEFA
South Africa	5	3	1	1	11	3	+8	60%	CAF
South Korea	3	2	1	0	9	3	+6	66.67%	AFC
Soviet Union	12	2	6	4	13	18	-5	16.67%	UEFA
Spain	39	13	7	19	44	73	-29	33.33%	UEFA
Sweden	24	13	5	6	37	23	+14	54.17%	UEFA
Switzerland	39	16	11	12	70	63	+7	41.03%	UEFA
Togo	1	1	0	0	2	0	+2	100%	CAF
Tunisia	5	2	2	1	7	4	+3	40%	CAF
Turkey	8	6	1	1	16	6	+10	75%	UEFA
United States	4	3	1	0	11	1	+10	75%	CONCACAF
Ukraine	14	8	5	1	29	8	+21	57.14%	UEFA
Uruguay	10	3	4	3	7	8	-1	30%	CONMEBOL
Wales	6	4	1	1	14	4	+10	66.67%	UEFA
Yugoslavia	26	9	7	10	41	39	+2	34.62%	UEFA

Opponent	Played	Won	Drawn	Lost	Goals for	Goals against	Goal difference	% Won
All	949	484	196	269	1721	1278	+442	51%
