= Battle of San Salvador (1822) =

- Part of the Mexican annexation of El Salvador and Arzu's campaign
Date	3 June 1822
Location	San Salvador, El Salvador
Result	Initial Mexican victory: San Salvador is occupied and looted; Eventual Salvadadoran victory: Salvadoran forces regroup and recapture San Salvador

Belligerents
(Mexico) Mexican Empire	El Salvador

Commanders and leaders
(Mexico) Manuel Arzú	(El Salvador) Manuel José Arce (El Salvador) Antonio Cañas (El Salvador) Rafael Castillo

Strength
1,000 men	Unknown

Casualties and losses
Some dead	Some dead 27 houses burned

The Battle of San Salvador or also known Sacking of San Salvador was a military action on June 3, 1822 in the town of San Salvador during Mexican annexation of Central America with the purpose of opposing the annexation to Mexico.

== Battle ==
In June 1822, a Guatemalan force under Manuel Arzú invaded the province of San Salvador and easily evaded the defenses and took the capital. The Guatemalans scattered and sacked San Salvador. The troops from the province regrouped and due to Manuel Arzú's poor organization, they took the Guatemalans by surprise and defeated them.

== See also ==
- Central America under Mexican rule
- Manuel Arzú
- Central American Uprising of 1821
