= La Granadera =

1823–1839 national anthem of the Federal Republic of Central America

English: The Grenadier
- National anthem of the Federal Republic of Central America and the Confederation of Central America
- Lyrics: Rómulo Ernesto Durón
- Music: Unknown
- Adopted: 1823
- Relinquished: 1839

Audio sample
- La Granadera: file; help

Instrumental recording of the anthem

La Granadera (Spanish for "The Grenadier") was the national anthem of the Federal Republic of Central America from 1823 until 1839, as well as the unofficial anthem of the Confederation of Central America from 1842 to 1844. The composer of the music is unknown; the words were written by Rómulo Ernesto Durón.

== Lyrics ==
Spanish lyrics	English translation
Ya se ve, Patria mía, en tu oriente Nuevo sol esparcir claridad; Ya podemos con voz reverente Pronunciar: Dios, Unión, Libertad. Cambiarán ya tu vida y tu suerte Un solo hombre tus hijos serán; Ya entre ellos no habrá guerra o muerte Y dichosos tu bien labrarán. Ya podrás alcanzar pura gloria, De tus próceres sueño tenaz; Y el laurel de tu espléndida historia Será signo de triunfos de paz. Salve, Patria, tu hermosa bandera Luce al viento del cielo el color; A su sombra juramos doquiera A vencer o morir por tu honor.	In your orient, it can be seen, my Fatherland, A new sun that spreads a shining light; We can now with a reverent voice Proclaim: God, Union, Liberty. Your life and fortune shall change All of your children shall be as one; There shall not be war nor death amongst them And in happiness their prosperity they’ll forge. May you reach pure glory, Of your heroes’ tenacious dream; And let the laurels of your splendid history Be a sign of triumphs of peace. Hail, your beautiful flag, O Fatherland It flies in the winds as the color of your sky; And under your shadow we solemnly swear To prevail or die for your honor.
