= Anderson–Gual Treaty =

1824 treaty between the United States and Gran Colombia

The Anderson–Gual Treaty (formally, the General Convention of Peace, Amity, Navigation, and Commerce) was an 1824 treaty between the United States and Gran Colombia. It is the first bilateral treaty that the United States concluded with another American country.

The treaty was concluded in Bogotá on 3 October 1824 and signed by U.S. diplomat Richard Clough Anderson and by Gran Colombian minister Pedro Gual Escandón. It was ratified by both countries and entered into force in May 1825.

The commercial provisions of the treaty granted reciprocal most-favored-nation status.

The treaty contained a clause that stated it would be in force for 12 years after ratification by both parties; the treaty therefore expired in 1837.

It served as the basis for the formation of a similar treaty with Mexico.

== See also ==
- United States–Central America Treaty
