= United States–Central America Treaty =

1825 treaty between the United States and Federal Republic of Central America

The United States–Central America Treaty (formally, the Treaty of Peace, Amity, Commerce, and Navigation between the United States of America and the Federal Republic of Central America) is an 1825 treaty between the United States and the Federal Republic of Central America. It was the second bilateral U.S. treaty concluded with a sovereign state in the Americas.

The treaty was concluded on 5 December 1825 in Washington, D.C. by U.S. Secretary of State Henry Clay and Central American ambassador Antonio José Cañas. The treaty was ratified by both countries and it entered into force on 2 August 1826 when ratifications were exchanged in Guatemala City.

The treaty was patterned after the 1824 Anderson–Gual Treaty between the U.S. and Colombia. Like the Anderson–Gual Treaty, the 1825 treaty granted reciprocal most-favored-nation trading status. The articles of the treaty that addressed commercial and navigation matters expired after 12 years. When the Federal Republic of Central America formally ceased to exist in 1847, the treaty lost its legal force and became moot.
