= Protective Allied Army of the Law =

- Ejército Aliado Protector de la Ley
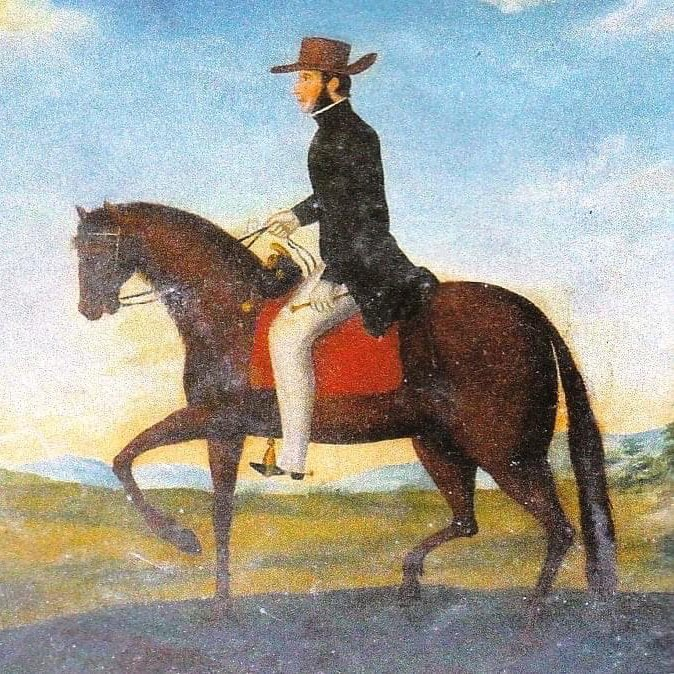
- General Morazán and the Allied Army’s triumphal entrance into San Salvador following the campaign of 1832.
- Active: 1828-1850s
- Country: Federal Republic of Central America
- Allegiance: Liberal Party of Central America, General Francisco Morazán
- Type: Army
- Size: Around 1,400 men
- Nickname(s): Allied Protective Army, Liberals, Morazánico Army.
- Engagements: First Central American Civil War, 1840 Invasion of Guatemala City, Battle of San José, Alajuela Uprising, Battle of La Arada

The Protective Allied Army of the Law (Spanish: Ejército Aliado Protector de la Ley) was a military force established by General Francisco Morazán during the First Central American Civil War in 1828. Morazán made his first public appearance as Commander in Chief of the force on 9 June 1829, in front of the Chamber of Deputies in Guatemala.

The Army was composed of primarily Honduran, Salvadoran and Nicaraguan volunteers. Some indigenous soldiers served as well.

== History ==
The force was established and led by Morazán in an effort to preserve the Federal Republic and Liberal rule in the nation after President Arce dissolved the congress. The Allied army engaged in countless battles across Central America and was responsible for Morazán's most notable victory, the Battle of La Trinidad. The engagement took place on November 11, 1827, between the Allied Army and the Federal Troops, both composed of men from across Central America. After the Allied Army defeated the 2nd Battalion, Morazán was proclaimed President of Honduras on November 27, 1827, and the Allied Army was sent up north and west to take control of the entire Honduran State.

== See also ==
- History of Central America
- First Central American Civil War
- Francisco Morazán
