= Juan Espinoza =

Juan Espinoza may refer to:

- Juan Carlos Espinoza (Honduran footballer) (born 1958), Honduran football midfielder and football manager
- Juan Espinoza (Ecuadorian footballer) (born 1987), Ecuadorian football centre-back
- Juan Carlos Espinoza (Chilean footballer) (born 1991), Chilean football right-back
- Juan Espinoza Medrano District, district in the province of Antabamba, Peru
