= Confederation of Central America =

Former country in Central America (1842-1845)

The Confederation of Central America La Confederación de Centroamérica
- 1842–1845
- Flag Coat of arms
- Anthem: "La Granadera" "The Grenadier" (Unofficial)
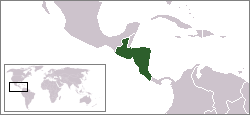
- Claimed territories of the Confederation
- Status: Confederation
- Capital: San Miguel
- Common languages: Spanish and various indigenous languages
- Religion: Catholicism
- Demonym: Central American
- President
  - 1842-1845: Antonio José Cañas
  - 1845: Fruto Chamorro Pérez

Population
  - 1842: ~2,000,000
Preceded by
Costa Rica
El Salvador
Guatemala
Honduras
Nicaragua
Succeeded by
Costa Rica
El Salvador
Guatemala
Honduras
Nicaragua

The Confederation of Central America (Note: Also sometimes called the Central American Confederation.) (Spanish: La Confederación de Centroamérica), was an attempt at unifying Central America. It first was a loose confederation of multiple Central American republics, created in 1842 to revive the Federal Republic of Central America, which had fallen in 1841.

It was one of many failed attempts to re-unify Central America after the initial federation, and like the others, it fell in a couple of years due to instability.

The confederation appointed Antonio José Cañas as its ruler with the title of supreme delegate, but each state retained its own head of state, and the effective authority of this office was practically nonexistent.

Fruto Chamorro Pérez was the last supreme delegate of the Confederation, which effectively dissolved in mid-1845 due to rivalries caused by conservative and liberal governments in each of the member states.

The Confederation bordered Mexico to the north and west, the Mosquito Kingdom and British Honduras to the east, and the Republic of New Granada to the south. After the Federal Republic of Central America had broken up into many republics, namely El Salvador, Costa Rica, Guatemala, Honduras, and Nicaragua, the region was still unstable. The Confederation lasted 3 years, from 1842-1845.

== Background ==
=== Spanish Central America ===
The Spanish conquered Central America in the 16th century. The region was divided into several audiencias (jurisdictions) until, in 1542, it was organized into a single audiencia extending north to the Isthmus of Tehuantepec and south to the Isthmus of Panama. Spain transferred control of the Yucatán Peninsula to New Spain (modern-day Mexico) in 1560, and transferred control of Panama to Peru seven years later. In 1568, the Central American audiencia was reorganized as the Captaincy General of Guatemala. The captaincy was subdivided into corregimientos, gobiernos, greater mayorships, and intendancies.

=== Independence of Central America ===
The Cortes of Cádiz (a Spanish constitutional congress in Cádiz) drafted the Spanish Constitution of 1812, which made Spain a constitutional monarchy. Ferdinand repealed the liberal constitution after returning to power in 1814, since he wanted to rule as an absolute monarch. His refusal to rule as a constitutional monarch and the desire of colonial leaders for greater local autonomy led to independence rebellions throughout Spain's American colonies. The rebellions were primarily led by liberals who supported the 1812 constitution's Enlightenment ideals. Conservatives joined the independence movements in 1820, when Ferdinand was forced by Colonel Rafael del Riego to restore the 1812 constitution. On 15 September 1821, Central American colonial leaders declared independence from Spain and signed the Act of Independence of Central America. They established the Consultive Junta to temporarily govern the region until a permanent government could be established. Most government administrators, including Brigadier General Gabino Gaínza (the final captain general of Guatemala), retained their positions.

After independence, Central American leaders were ideologically divided about whether to remain independent or to join the First Mexican Empire; monarchists supported annexation, opposed by republicans and nationalists. Mexican Regent (and later Mexican Emperor) Agustín de Iturbide asked the Consultive Junta to join the First Mexican Empire in November 1821, and the junta voted for annexation on 5 January 1822. The Mexicans sent Brigadier General Vicente Filísola to enforce the annexation. Liberals in Costa Rica, El Salvador, and Nicaragua resisted Mexican attempts to annex the region. Liberals and conservatives fought in Costa Rica's Ochomogo War, which ended with the liberals gaining control of the country. Liberal rebels in El Salvador, led by Delgado and Arce, resisted two invasions by Filísola in 1822 and 1823. The former ended with an armistice and Mexican withdrawal; the latter resulted in Filísola overthrowing Delgado as the political leader of El Salvador (forcing Arce to flee to the United States) and capturing the city of San Salvador. General José Anacleto Ordóñez launched a rebellion against conservative Nicaraguan political leader Miguel González Saravia y Colarte, capturing several cities. Ordóñez's rebellion continued after Central America declared its independence from Mexico.

On 19 March 1823, Iturbide abdicated the Mexican throne. When news of Iturbide's abdication reached Filísola on 29 March, he called for Central American political leaders to establish a congress to determine the region's future. The Mexican Constituent Congress ordered Mexican forces in Central America to cease hostilities on 1 April, and the Central American congress convened on 24 June. Except for the state of Chiapas, it declared Central American independence from Mexico on 1 July.

=== Federal Republic of Central America ===
After Central America (then the Captaincy General of Guatemala) declared its independence from the Spanish Empire in September 1821, it was annexed by the First Mexican Empire in January 1822 before regaining its independence and forming a federal republic in 1823. The Federal Republic of Central America adopted its constitution, based on that of the federal government of the United States, in November 1824. It held its first presidential election in April 1825, during which liberal politician Manuel José Arce was elected as the country's first president. Arce subsequently aligned himself with the country's conservatives due to liberal opposition to the concessions he granted conservatives to secure his election as president. The republic was politically unstable, experiencing civil wars, rebellions, and insurrections by liberals and conservatives.

=== Collapse of the Federal Republic ===
The cracks of the Federal Republic were already showing in 1838, as on 30 May of that year, the Federal Republic declared any of the states could become an independent republic. Nicaragua declared independence on 30 April. Honduras followed on 26 October, followed by Costa Rica on 15 November. On February 2, 1839, all of Central America's elected government officials left office. On 17 April, Guatemalan President Rafael Carrera issued a decree dissolving the Federal Republic of Central America; the Federal Congress accepted his decree on 14 July. On 30 January 1841, El Salvador declared independence from the Federal Republic of Central America. Due to the last member state leaving, the Federal Republic officially collapsed. At the fall of the federal republic, four of its five successor states were led by opponents of federal rule and proponents of their respective states' secession: Braulio Carrillo (Costa Rica), Francisco Malespín (El Salvador), Carrera (Guatemala), and Francisco Ferrera (Honduras).

== Start of the Confederation ==
Delegations from El Salvador, Honduras, and Nicaragua met at Chinandega in March 17, 1842, and on 11 April, they had a declaration in seven articles establishing a "gobierno national provisorio", with Antonio Jose Canas as the head of the state of the Confederation, called a "Supreme Delegate". However, Guatemala and El Salvador did not send any delegates.

== Dissolution ==
The Confederation's life was brief and turbulent. Great Britain denied it diplomatic recognition, its relations with Guatemala were tense, and to make matters worse, a bloody war broke out between the three confederated states because in El Salvador the conservatives, led by Francisco Malespín, seized power; while in Nicaragua, the liberals of León governed in rivalry with the conservatives of Granada. While El Salvador and Guatemala were going to send delegates, this was futile.

In mid-1845, newly appointed Supreme Delegate Chamorro Pérez proposed a draft of a new pact to the States, but his term ended without any decision being made. By that time, the Confederation was practically dissolved.

== Sources ==
- Bernal Ramírez, Luis Guillermo & Quijano de Batres, Ana Elia, eds. (2009). Historia 1 El Salvador [History 1 El Salvador] (PDF). Historia El Salvador (in Spanish). El Salvador: Ministry of Education. ISBN 9789992363683. Archived from the original (PDF) on 28 May 2022.
- Bolaños Geyer, Enrique (2018). "La Independencia de Nicaragua" [The Independence of Nicaragua]. Enrique Bolaños Biblioteca (in Spanish). Archived from the original on 31 March 2022.
- Flemion, Philip F. (1 November 1973). "States' Rights and Partisan Politics: Manuel José Arce and the Struggle for Central American Union". The Hispanic American Historical Review. 53 (4). Duke University Press: 600–618. doi:10.1215/00182168-53.4.600. ISSN 0018-2168. JSTOR 2511902. OCLC 5791727748.
- Foster, Lynn V. (2007). A Brief History of Central America (2nd ed.). New York City: Facts on File. ISBN 9780816066711. OCLC 72161924.
- Jiménez González, Victor Manuel, ed. (2009). Chiapas: Guía para descubrir los encantos del estado [Chiapas: A Guide to Discovering the Charms of the State] (in Spanish). Mexico City: Editorial Océano de México, SA de CV. ISBN 978-607-400-059-7.
- Karnes, Thomas L. (1961). The Failure of Union: Central America, 1824–1960. Chapel Hill, North Carolina: University of North Carolina Press. ISBN 9780807808160. OCLC 484694.
- Kenyon, Gordon (1 May 1961). "Mexican Influence in Central America, 1821–1823". The Hispanic American Historical Review. 41 (2). Duke University Press: 175–205. doi:10.1215/00182168-41.2.175. ISSN 0018-2168. JSTOR 2510200. OCLC 5548601156.
- Meléndez Chaverri, Carlos (2000). José Matías Delgado, Prócer Centroamericano [José Matías Delgado, Central American Hero] (in Spanish). Vol. 8 (2nd ed.). San Salvador, El Salvador: Dirección de Publicaciones e Impresos. ISBN 9789992300572. OCLC 1035898393.
- Munro, Dana G. (1918). Kinley, David (ed.). The Five Republics of Central America; Their Political and Economic Development and Their Relations with the United States. New York City: Oxford University Press. LCCN 18005317. OCLC 1045598807.
- Obregón Quesada, Clotilde María (2002). Nuestros Gobernantes: Verdades del Pasado para Comprender el Futuro [Our Governors: Truths of the Past to Comprehend the Future] (in Spanish) (2nd ed.). San José, Costa Rica: Editorial Universidad de Costa Rica. ISBN 9789977677019. OCLC 53218900.
- Stanger, Francis Merriman (February 1932). "National Origins in Central America". The Hispanic American Historical Review. 12 (1). Duke University Press: 18–45. doi:10.2307/2506428. JSTOR 2506428. OCLC 19342161.
