= Dionisio de Herrera =

First Head of State of Honduras

Head of State of Honduras
- In office 1824–1827
- Preceded by: office created
- Succeeded by: José Justo Milla

Head of State of Nicaragua
- In office 1830–1833
- Preceded by: Juan Espinosa
- Succeeded by: Benito Morales

Personal details
- Born: 9 October 1781 Choluteca, Spanish Empire
- Died: 13 June 1850 (aged 68) San Vicente, El Salvador
- Party: Liberal Party
- Occupation: Lawyer, Statesman
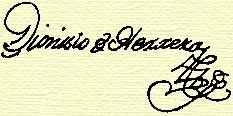
- Signature

José Dionisio de la Trinidad de Herrera y Díaz del Valle (9 October 1781 – 13 June 1850) was a Liberal Honduran politician, head of state of Honduras from 1824 to 1827 and head of state of Nicaragua from 1830 to 1833. During his terms, Honduras and Nicaragua were states within the Federal Republic of Central America. Herrera was an uncle of the Liberal Central American general Francisco Morazán.

== Education ==
From a land-owning family, Herrera studied at the University of San Carlos of Guatemala, where he earned a law degree and came in contact with the liberal ideas of the French Revolution. He was a tutor of his nephew, General Morazán.

== Public office ==
In 1820 he occupied his first public office, as secretary of the town government of Tegucigalpa. On 16 September 1824 he became the first head of state of Honduras, after the independence of Central America from Spain and from Mexico. Colonel José Justo Milla was his vice-head of state. During his term he decreed the first territorial subdivisions of Honduras, creating the departments of Comayagua, Tegucigalpa, Santa Bárbara, Yoro, Olancho and Choluteca (department). He also promulgated the first constitution of the country (state), on 11 December 1825.

He survived an assassination attempt on November 3, 1826.

The government of Herrera was overthrown on 10 May 1827 in a coup d'état led by Colonel Milla and aided by Honduran Conservatives. Herrera was sent as a prisoner to Guatemala, where he remained until 1829.

Thereafter he was elected head of state of Nicaragua, taking office on 12 May 1830. He exercised this office until November 1833, relying on the support of General Morazán. He tried to implement various Liberal reforms, but unsuccessfully, due to the opposition of the clergy. In 1835 he was elected head of state of El Salvador, but he declined the office. In 1838 he retired from politics, working as a teacher in the city of San Vicente, El Salvador. He remained there until his death in 1850.

Political offices
Preceded by none	Head of state of Honduras; 1824–1827	Succeeded by José Justo Milla
Preceded by Juan Espinosa; Acting	Head of state of Nicaragua; 1830–1833	Succeeded by Benito Morales; Acting
