= Manuel Arzú =

Mexican and Nicaraguan military officer

Interim Governor of Nicaragua
- In office 4 January 1825 – 2 April 1825
- Preceded by: José Anacleto Ordóñez
- Succeeded by: Manuel Antonio de la Cerda

Personal details
- Born: Manuel Arzú y Delgado y Nájera; 1775 New Spain
- Died: 15 February 1835 (aged 59–60) Guatemala City, Federal Republic of Central America
- Occupation: Military officer

Military service
- Allegiance: Spanish Empire; Mexican Empire; Central America
- Rank: Colonel
- Battles/wars: Mexican annexation of El Salvador; Anacleto's rebellion; First Central American Civil War

Manuel Arzú y Delgado y Nájera (1775 – 15 February 1835) was a Mexican and Nicaraguan military officer who held the position of interim governor of Nicaragua in 1825.

== Biography ==
Manuel Arzú y Delgado y Nájera was born in 1775 in New Spain. He served for the Spanish Empire as a military officer. In 1822, while serving for the First Mexican Empire, Arzú was placed in charge of a military force and was tasked with suppressing Salvadoran resistance to Mexican annexation. His forces captured San Salvador on 5 April 1822 and forced its defenders to abandon the city.

In 1824, while serving for the Federal Republic of Central America, Arzú commanded federal soldiers to crush a rebellion in Nicaragua led by José Anacleto Ordóñez. After he crushed the rebellion, he was named as Nicaragua's interim governor from 4 January 1825 until 2 April 1825, when he was replaced with Manuel Antonio de la Cerda.

He established Guatemala's first military academy.
