= Juan Espinosa (politician) =

Nicaraguan politician

Juan Espinosa was a Nicaraguan politician who, as President of the Representative Council, served as acting Head of State of Nicaragua from 8 November 1829 to 10 May 1830, in the absence of Dionisio de Herrera who was initially elected as Head of State.

== Political career ==
On 1 November 1829, the new Legislative Assembly of the State met in Rivas at the request of the Federal Government of Central America to elect liberal Dionisio de Herrera as the Head of State as a peacemaker in order to restore peace in Nicaragua after a bloody civil conflict.

However, Herrera was only able to assume command only a few months later, so the Executive Power was provisionally handed over to Espinosa, President of the Representative Council, on 8 November 1829.

=== As Head of State ===
Thanks to the intervention of the Federal Government, it was possible to put an end to the anarchy in Nicaragua, which characterized the government of Vice Chief Juan Argüello del Castillo since 1825, and to establish a relative tranquility in the country.

On 30 January 1830 Espinosa declared the city of Granada the seat of the Supreme Powers of the State, thus making a new transfer of the capital city of Nicaragua.

Herrera arrived from Guatemala in April 1830, and he was handed the Executive Power on 10 May.

Political offices
Preceded by Juan Argüello del Castillo	Head of State of Nicaragua (acting); 1829 – 1830	Succeeded by Dionisio de Herrera
