= El Salvador–United States relations =

- El Salvador: United States

According to the 2012 U.S. Global Leadership Report, 55% of Salvadorans approve U.S. leadership, with 19% disapproving and 26% uncertain, the fourth-highest rating for any surveyed country in the Americas.

== Historical relations ==
The history of U.S.-El Salvador relations encompasses some controversial moves and operations by the United States, e.g. the U.S.-involvement in the Salvadoran Civil War and interference in Salvadoran elections, such as during the 2004 presidential election.

== Cultural relations ==
On 10 June 2014, UNICEF reported a significant increase in the numbers of unaccompanied Salvadoran children seeking to enter the United States without their parents:

According to US Government statistics, over 47,000 unaccompanied children have been detained on the southwestern US border over the past eight months, almost double the number of children detained between October 2012 and September 2013. The United Nations High Commissioner for Refugees estimates that at least 10,000 additional children will attempt to enter the US without their parents before the end of September.

=== Friendship Day between U.S. and El Salvador ===
On March 9, 2017, with 66 votes in favor, the Salvadoran Legislative Assembly approved the declaration of June 15 as “Friendship Day between El Salvador and United States.” The initiative was studied by the Committee for Cultural and Educational Affairs of the Legislative Assembly to commemorate the establishment of diplomatic relations between the two countries on June 15, 1863. The bilateral relations between the two countries have strengthened through joint programs and initiatives such as Partnership for Growth, the Millennium Challenge Corporation compacts (MCC) with El Salvador, known in El Salvador as FOMILENIO I and II, and the U.S. support to initiatives such as the Alliance for Prosperity. The “Friendship Day between the United States and El Salvador Decree” exemplifies the close bilateral relationship and aims to highlight the continued commitment to working together to improve safety and promote prosperity in El Salvador.

== Political relations ==
On January 11, 2018, The Washington Post reported that, in a discussion protecting immigrants from El Salvador, Haiti, and African countries, U.S. president Donald Trump asked, "Why are we having all these people from shithole countries come here?" After the report was released, Trump denied on Twitter that he used the term, "shithole countries", but said that he used tough language in regards to the countries. Meanwhile, a spokesperson for the United Nations condemned Trump's comment, describing it as "racist". El Salvador President Salvador Sanchez Ceren said that he "vigorously rejected" the comments that were attributed to Trump.

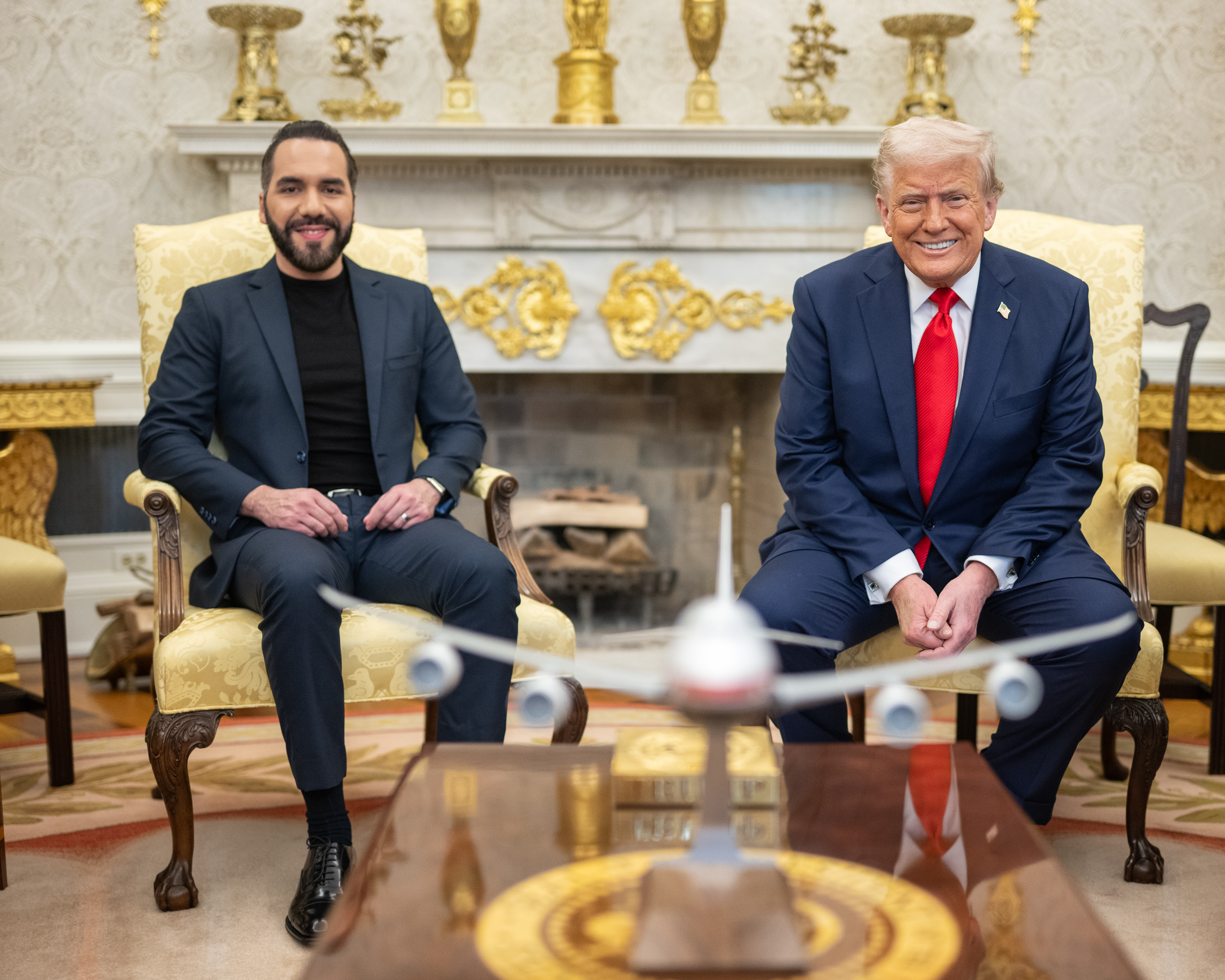
U.S. President Donald Trump meets with El Salvador President Nayib Bukele in April 2025 at the Oval Office.

U.S.-Salvadoran relations remain close and strong. U.S. policy towards the country promotes the strengthening of El Salvador's democratic institutions, rule of law, judicial reform, and civilian police; national reconciliation and reconstruction; and economic opportunity and growth. El Salvador has been a committed member of the coalition of nations fighting against terrorism and has sent 10 rotations of troops to Iraq to support Operation Iraqi Freedom.

U.S. ties to El Salvador are dynamic and growing. More than 19,000 American citizens live and work full-time in El Salvador. Most are private businesspersons and their families, but a small number of American citizen retirees have been drawn to El Salvador by favorable tax conditions. However, following the Salvadoran government's controversial decision to cut ties with Taiwan in favor of the People's Republic of China in August 2019, some Republican senators like Marco Rubio had demanded that economical aid to the country be cut and their expulsion from Alianza Para Prosperidad (a U.S.-supported program to help El Salvador, Honduras and Guatemala with education and healthcare to reduce illegal immigration to the United States). The Embassy's consular section provides a full range of citizenship services to this community. The American Chamber of Commerce in El Salvador is located at World Trade Center, Torre 2, local No. 308, 89 Av. Nte. Col. Escalón.

=== Donald Trump's second Presidency ===
Upon the re-election of President Donald Trump and now Secretary of State Marco Rubio, cooperation on matters of illegal immigration has increased. Bukele offered to begin taking migrants of any nationality from the United States, even going as far as to offer to house American criminals with a violent record. In exchange for taking in those sent by the Trump administration, Bukele requested the return of MS-13 leadership. MS-13 leadership leaving the U.S. could hamper an investigation into ties between gangs and the Salvador government.

El Salvador–United States relations faced renewed strain over the wrongful deportation of Kilmar Abrego Garcia, a Salvadoran migrant who had lived legally in Maryland for 14 years. In March 2025, Garcia was deported amid a broader immigration crackdown, despite lacking a criminal record and having a pending legal case. On April 10, 2025, the U.S. Supreme Court ordered his return, but the Trump administration acknowledged only that Garcia was “alive and secure” in a Salvadoran prison. A federal judge criticized the administration's failure to provide clarity on efforts to repatriate him, especially as President Trump prepared to meet Salvadoran President Nayib Bukele later that month. On 14 April 2025, President Nayib Bukele met President Donald Trump in the Oval Office at the White House. In July 2026, Presidents Bukele and Trump met also privately in the Oval Office.

== Resident diplomatic missions ==
of El Salvador in the United States

- Washington, D.C. (Embassy)
- Aurora, Colorado (Consulate-General)
- Boston, Massachusetts (Consulate-General)
- Charlotte, North Carolina (Consulate-General)
- Chicago, Illinois (Consulate-General)
- Dallas, Texas (Consulate-General)
- Doral, Florida (Consulate-General)
- Duluth, Georgia (Consulate-General)
- El Paso, Texas (Consulate-General)
- Elizabeth, New Jersey (Consulate-General)
- Fresno, California (Consulate-General)
- Houston, Texas (Consulate-General)
- Las Vegas, Nevada (Consulate-General)
- Los Angeles, California (Consulate-General)
- McAllen, Texas (Consulate-General)
- Nashville, Tennessee (Consulate-General)
- New York City (Consulate-General)
- Omaha, Nebraska (Consulate-General)
- Plainview, New York (Consulate-General)
- Saint Paul, Minnesota (Consulate-General)
- Salt Lake City, Utah (Consulate-General)
- San Antonio, Texas (Consulate-General)
- San Bernardino, California (Consulate-General)
- San Francisco, California (Consulate-General)
- Seattle, Washington (Consulate-General)
- Silver Spring, Maryland (Consulate-General)
- Springdale, Arkansas (Consulate-General)
- Tucson, Arizona (Consulate-General)
- Woodbridge, Virginia (Consulate-General)

of the United States in El Salvador

- San Salvador (Embassy)

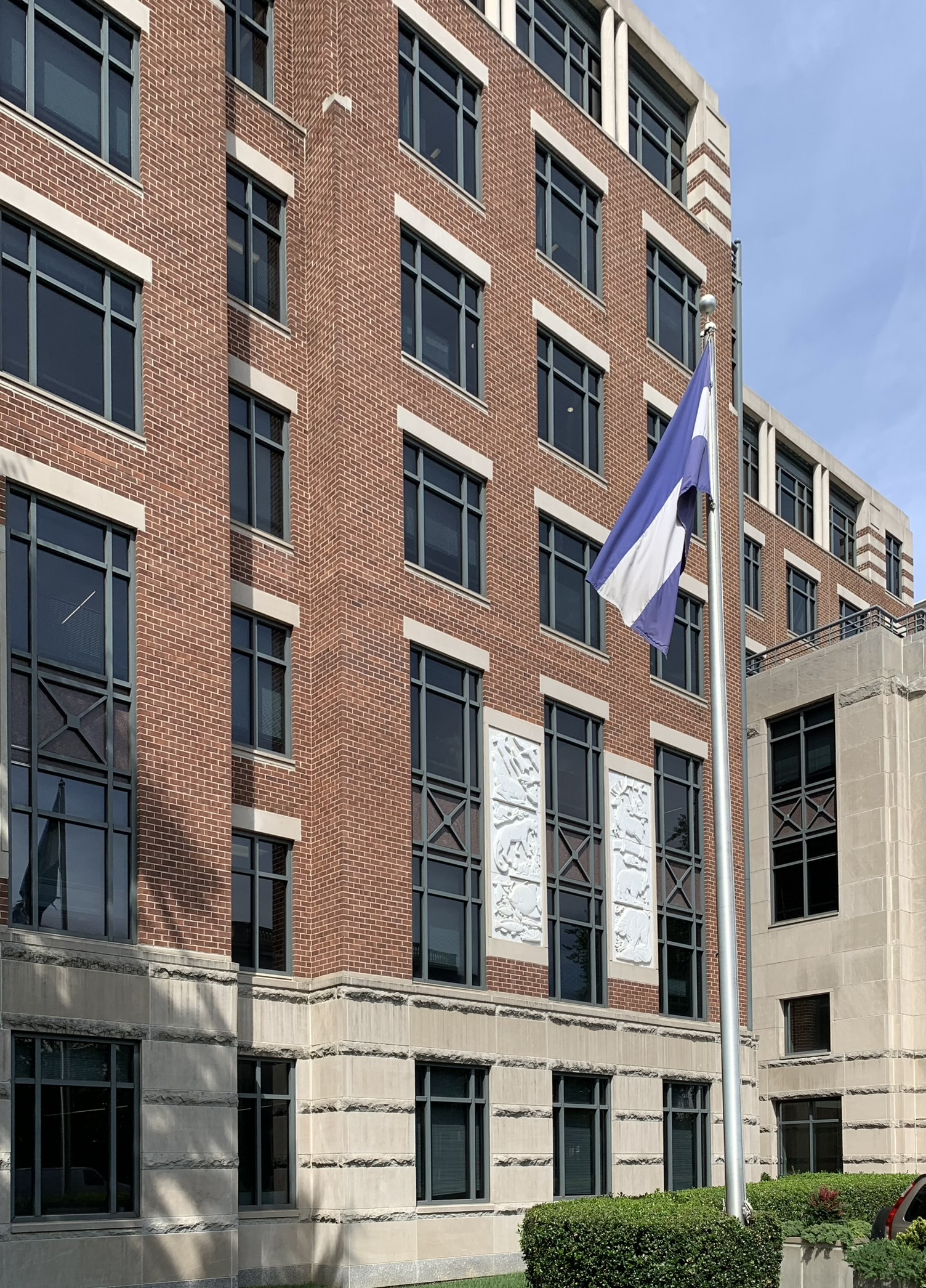
Building hosting the Embassy of El Salvador in Washington, D.C.

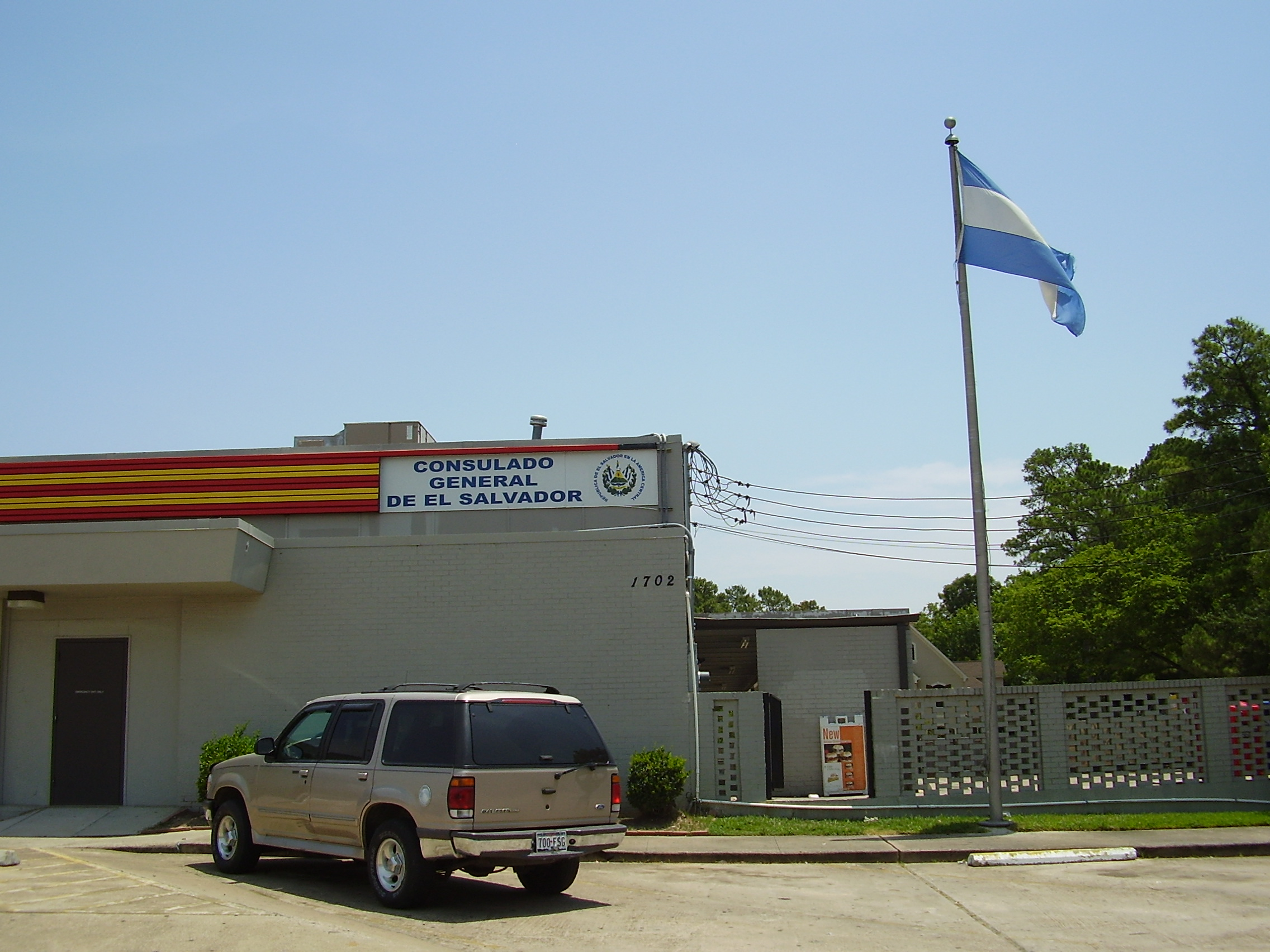
Consulate-General of El Salvador in Houston

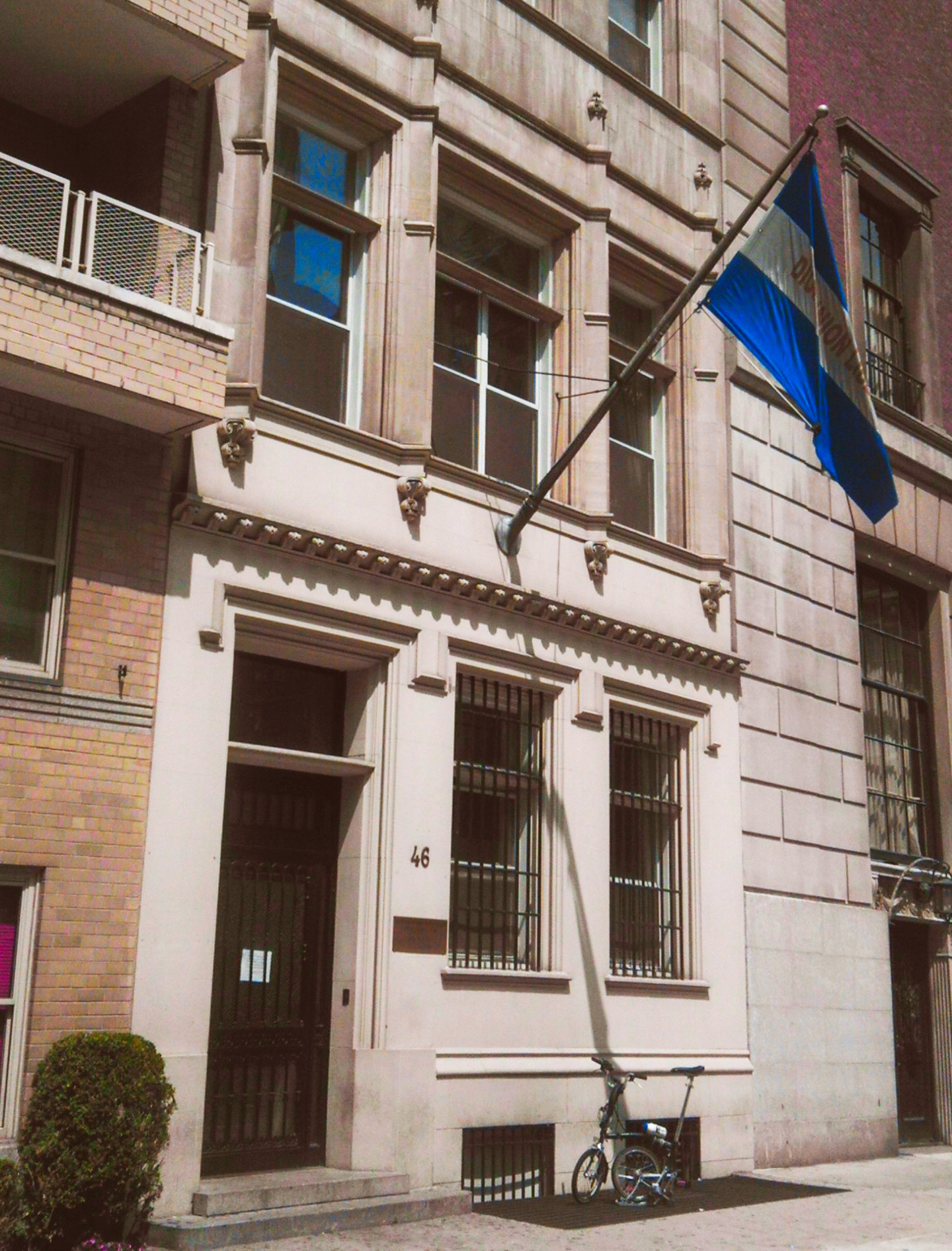
Consulate-General of El Salvador in New York City

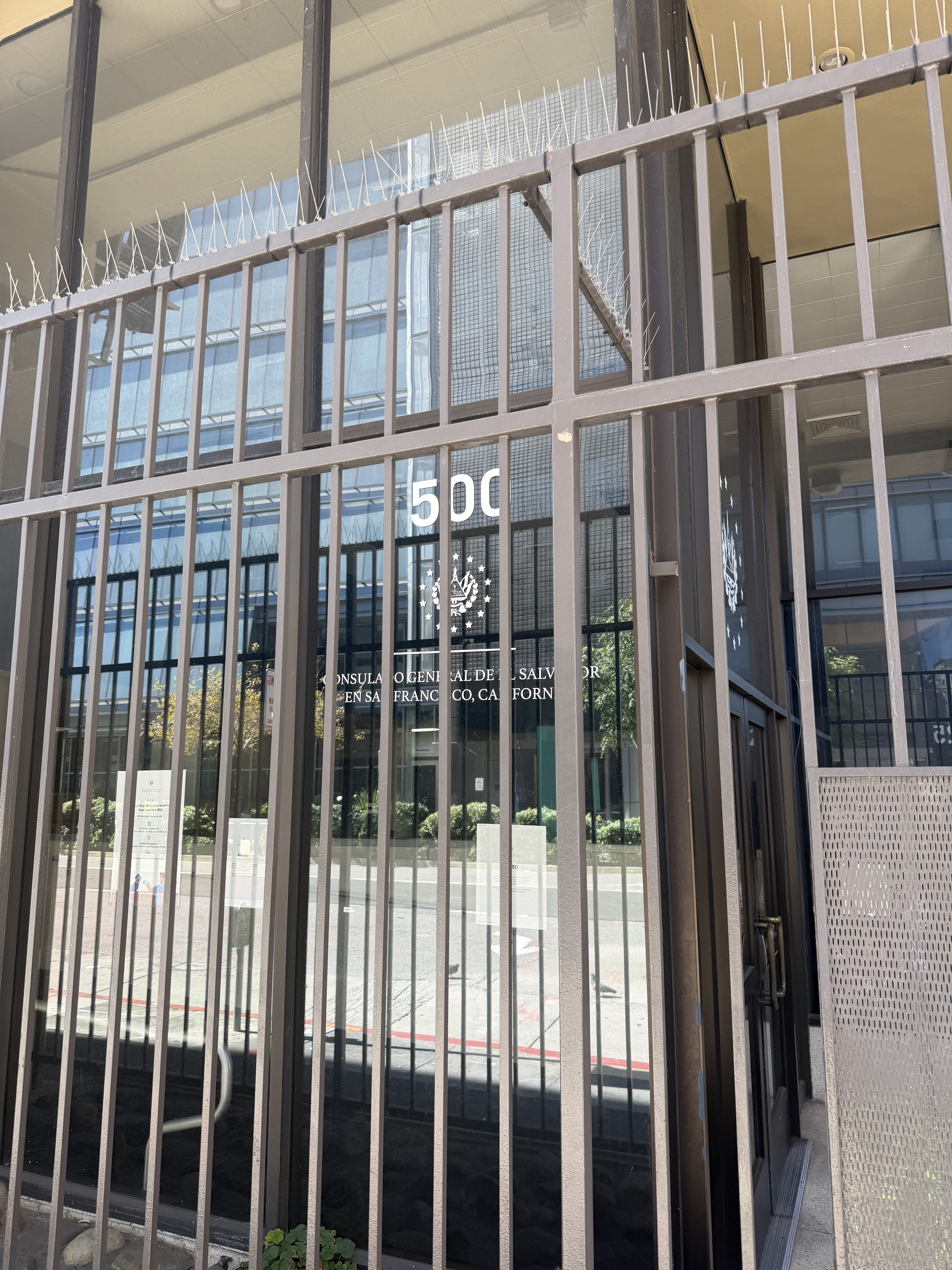
Consulate-General of El Salvador in San Francisco

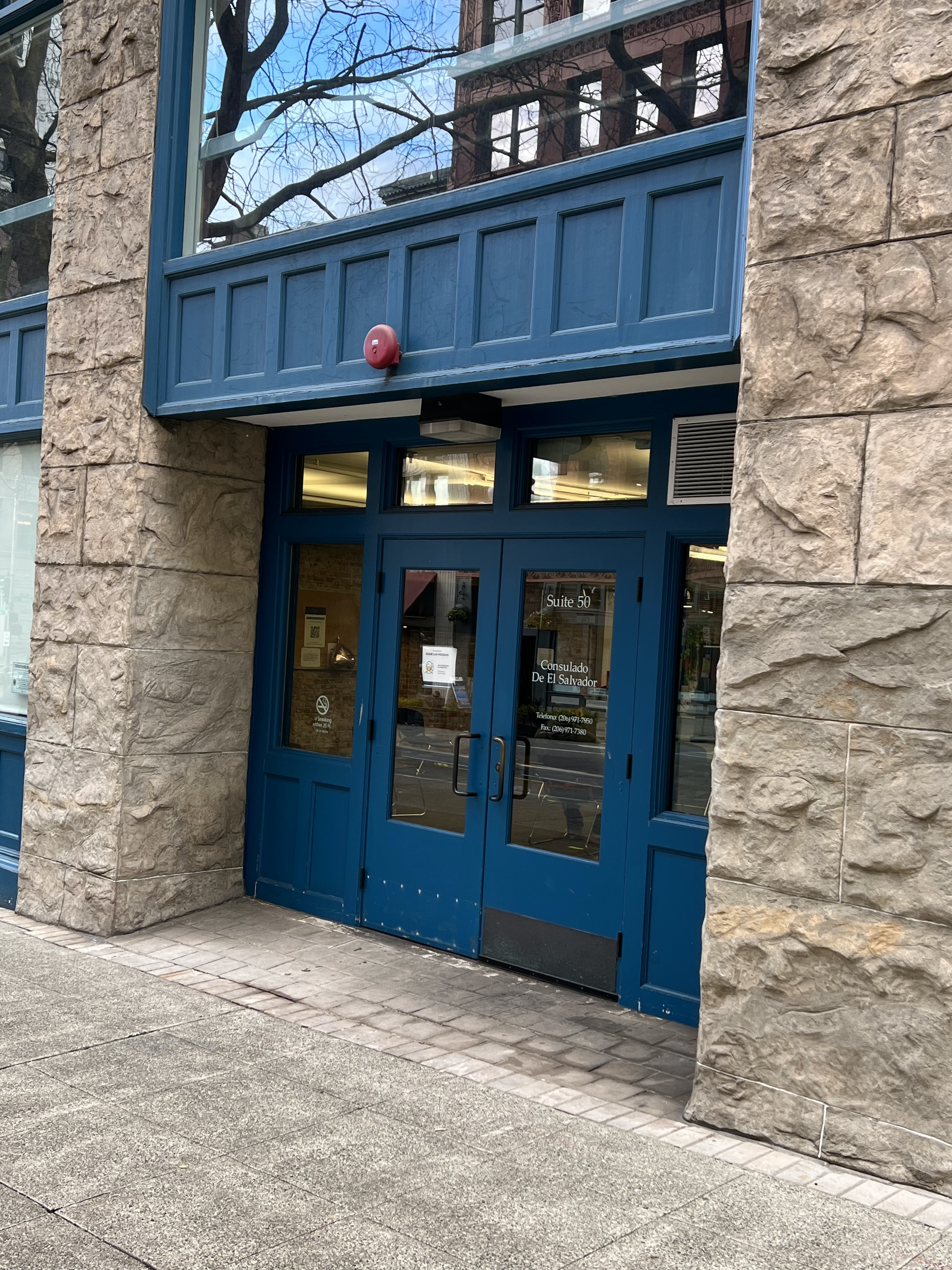
Consulate-General of El Salvador in Seattle
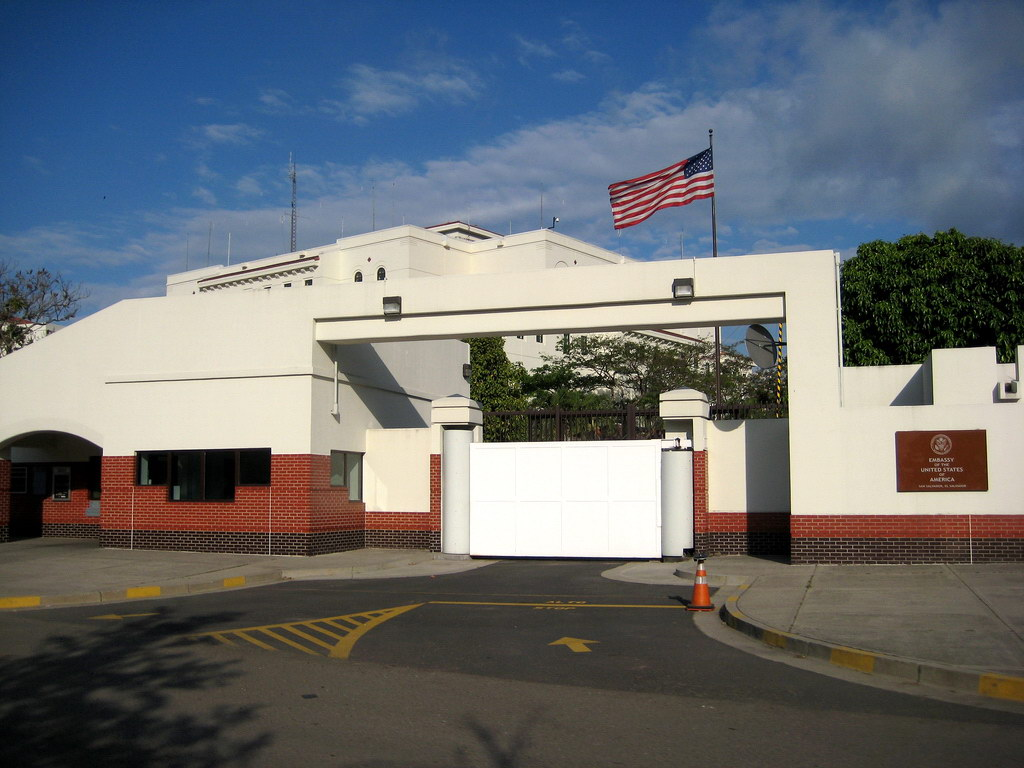
Embassy of the United States in San Salvador

== See also ==
- Salvadoran Americans
