= Sabanagrande, Honduras =

Sabanagrande
- Municipality
- Location in Honduras
- Coordinates: 13°48′N 87°16′W
- Country: Honduras
- Department: Francisco Morazán

Area
  - Municipality: 255 km^{2} (98 sq mi)

Population (2023)
  - Municipality: 23,943
  - Density: 93.9/km^{2} (243/sq mi)
  - Urban: 3,413

Sabanagrande is a municipality in the Honduran department of Francisco Morazán.

People make a living by planting corn and beans and selling them on the market. Many people also sell rosquillas. Cattle is also raised and cheese and other products are sold.
