= La Trinidad, Comayagua =

La Trinidad
- Municipality
- Location within Honduras
- Coordinates: 14°43′N 87°40′W
- Country: Honduras
- Department: Comayagua

Area
  - Total: 86 km^{2} (33 sq mi)

Population (2015)
  - Total: 4,633
  - Density: 54/km^{2} (140/sq mi)

La Trinidad (Spanish pronunciation: [la tɾiniˈðað]) is a municipality in the Honduran department of Comayagua.
