= Cleto Ordóñez =

Supreme Chief of Nicaragua (1824–1825)

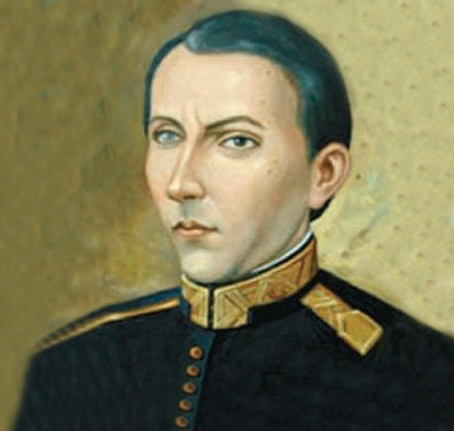

De facto Supreme Chief of Nicaragua
- In office August 1824 – 4 January 1825
- Preceded by: Pablo Méndez
- Succeeded by: Manuel Arzú

Personal details
- Born: José Anacleto Ordóñez Bermúdez; 1778 Granada, Captaincy General of Guatemala
- Died: 1839 (aged 60–61) San Salvador, El Salvador
- Occupation: Soldier, politician

Military service
- Rank: General

José Anacleto Ordóñez Bermúdez (1778–1839), also known as Cleto Ordóñez, and nicknamed "El tuerto Ordóñez" by his detractors, was a liberal Nicaraguan soldier, politician and prominent Central American unionist who served as de facto Supreme Chief of Nicaragua from August 1824 to 4 January 1825.

== Family ==
Ordóñez was the illegitimate child of captain Diego de Irigoyen he had with María Isidora Bermúdez, a woman of African descent. He was the paternal brother of the priest Policarpo Irigoyen (1775–1829), parish priest of the town of Managua and president of the governing board that was formed with headquarters in that town.

== Military career ==
=== Rebellion ===
Ordóñez launched a rebellion against the government of Miguel González Saravia y Colarte on 16 January 1823, capturing various cities across the country, and declaring the independence of Granada, against the ideas of Nicaraguan annexation to the Mexican Empire.

=== Civil war ===
In 1824 a civil war broke out fueled by political unrest between the liberals (fiebres or calandracas) led by Ordóñez and the conservatives (serviles or timbucos) led by Crisanto Sacasa y Parodi.

This chaotic situation is evidenced by the existence of simultaneous Governing Boards in León, Granada, Managua and El Viejo. In Granada, the situation was more complex because, between 20 April 1823 and 4 January 1825, two contradictory Boards coexisted. The second, also known as the Revolutionary Government Junta, was presided over by Ordóñez and was also made up of Raimundo Tiffer, Ignacio Marenco, Solano Castrillo, Manuel Sandoval and Nicolás de la Rocha Zapata. Ordóñez ruled as the de facto Supreme Chief of Nicaragua from August 1824 to 4 January 1825.

=== Inspector General of Arms ===
After the pacification of the state of Nicaragua and before returning to Guatemala, Manuel José Arce sent Bishop Nicolás García Jerez, a monarchist opposed to Independence, and the priest Policarpo Irigoyen into exile, both in rebellion against the federalist government of Manuel Arzú. Ordóñez was offered the position of Inspector General of Arms of the Federal Republic of Central America. Once installed in Guatemala, Ordóñez became Inspector General of Arms for Central America and a member of the Federal Government's War Advisory Board.

Being elected President of the Federal Republic, Arce yielded to the flattery of the Guatemalan oligarchy, and on 6 September 1825, he took Juan Burrindia, Head of State of Guatemala, prisoner and dissolved the Federal Legislative Assembly. All this earned him the contempt of Ordóñez, who ridiculed him during an official banquet. This incident sealed the enmity between the two, President Arce accused Ordóñez of conspiracy and imprisoned him.

== Later life and death ==
At the beginning of 1827, Ordóñez escaped from prison fleeing to El Salvador where he joined the Guatemalan liberals. In March he was designated as one of the heads of the federalist army that advanced into Guatemala. On 23 March, the first confrontation took place and he demonstrated his mettle by being the only leader who resisted in his position, guaranteeing the withdrawal of the other troops.

He died in 1839 in San Salvador, receiving official honors in recognition of his services to the federal cause in Central America. His remains rest in the church of San Esteban.
