= Second Central American Civil War =

Military conflict between 1838 and 1840

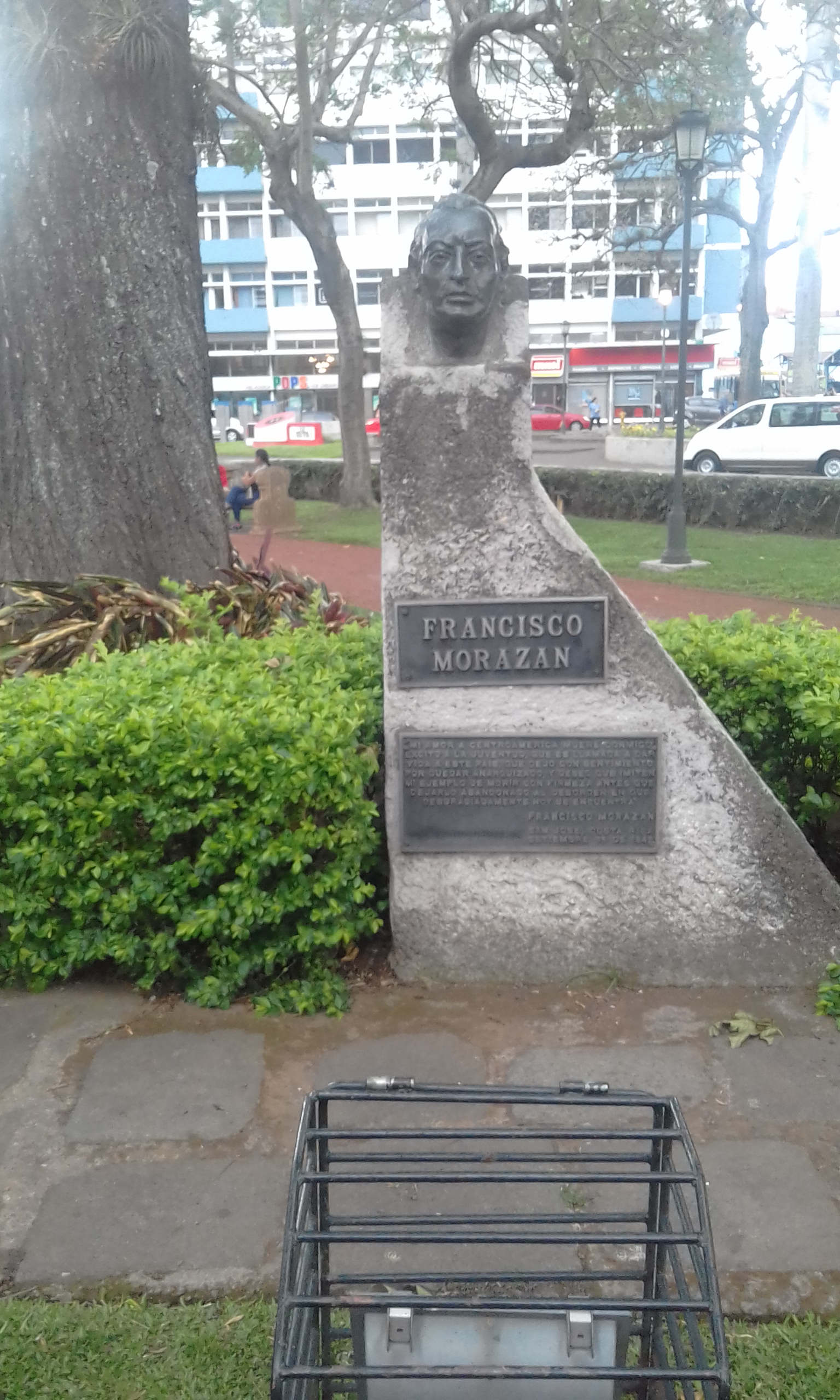
- Bust of Morazán where he was executed putting an end on the Second Central American Civil War
Date	1838–1840
Location	Central America
Result	Separatist victory
Territorial changes	Dissolution of the Federal Republic of Central America

Combatants
Unionists: Federal Republic of Central America; El Salvador	Separatists: Guatemala; Nicaragua; Honduras

Commanders and leaders
Francisco Morazán; José Trinidad Cabañas; Indalecio Cordero	Rafael Carrera; Francisco Ferrera; Bernardo Méndez

The Second Central American Civil War or the Second Central American Federal War was a military conflict in Central America between 1838 and 1840.

== Background ==
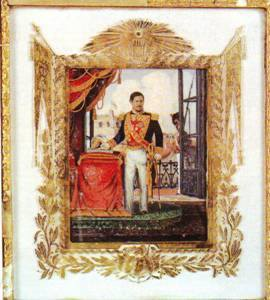
General Carrera portrait celebrating the foundation of the Republic of Guatemala in 1847

=== Separation of Costa-Rica from the Federal Pact ===
A military coup brought to the Headquarters of Costa Rica, in May 1838, Mr. Braulio Carrillo, a character judged by some to be a good Head of State and by others to be a tyrant. In reality, Carrillo maintained order in his country, but he established himself as the arbiter of the destinies of that town. The laws that he enacted tended to consolidate him, he suppressed freedom and persecuted anyone who hindered him. On June 25, 1838, an extraordinary Assembly declared him Supreme Head of the State.

Carrillo began by ordering deputies and senators to leave their positions in the Federal Congress and Senate, and had the State Assembly declare, on November 14 of the same year, Costa Rica in the fullness of its sovereignty. Costa Rica has since formed an independent nation.

=== Dissolution of the Federal Authorities ===
On May 18, 1838, the Federal Congress, meeting in San Salvador, authorized the States to organize themselves regardless of national laws, while the Fundamental Charter of the Republic was reformed, and as such, the Head of Honduras, Justo Herrera, who had been in command since 1837, called a Constituent Assembly, who declared, on October 12, 1838, the sovereignty and independence of the country.

In such circumstances, separated from the Federal Pact, Nicaragua first, Honduras later and Costa Rica last, it was not possible to hold elections for the renewal of the authorities of the Republic, whose constitutional period was about to end, so, when the February 2, 1839, without deputies to Congress, Magistrates to the Supreme Court and Chief of the Executive having been elected, the Republic remained headless and the Federal Pact was effectively dissolved.

=== Separation of Guatemala ===
By 1837, numerous grievances voiced by rural masses against the liberal government of Guatemala led to an uprising. Rafael Carrera rallied both indigenous and poor peasants of mixed race in the east and south of the country into an armed resistance with the aim of restoring part of the colonial traditions that the liberals had abandoned. Francisco Morazán, the president of Central America, repeatedly drove Carrera's forces out of cities and towns, but Carrera's followers would retake places as soon as Morazán's army left.

The Assembly of Guatemala, meeting in January 1839, declared General Carlos Salazar Head of State, and Mariano Rivera Paz returned to the Government Council. Carrera revolted again against the constituted Government. He marched quickly over the city of Guatemala, which he managed to occupy after a short resistance. Carrera placed Rivera Paz in leadership, and Salazar took the path of exile.

One of Rivera Paz's first acts was to declare that the State of Guatemala resumed its independence (Decree of April 17) forming the country into the departments of Guatemala, Sacatepéquez, Verapaz and Chiquimula, a decree that earned the approval of the Assembly of the Federal Republic of Central America on the following July 14.

== Conflict ==
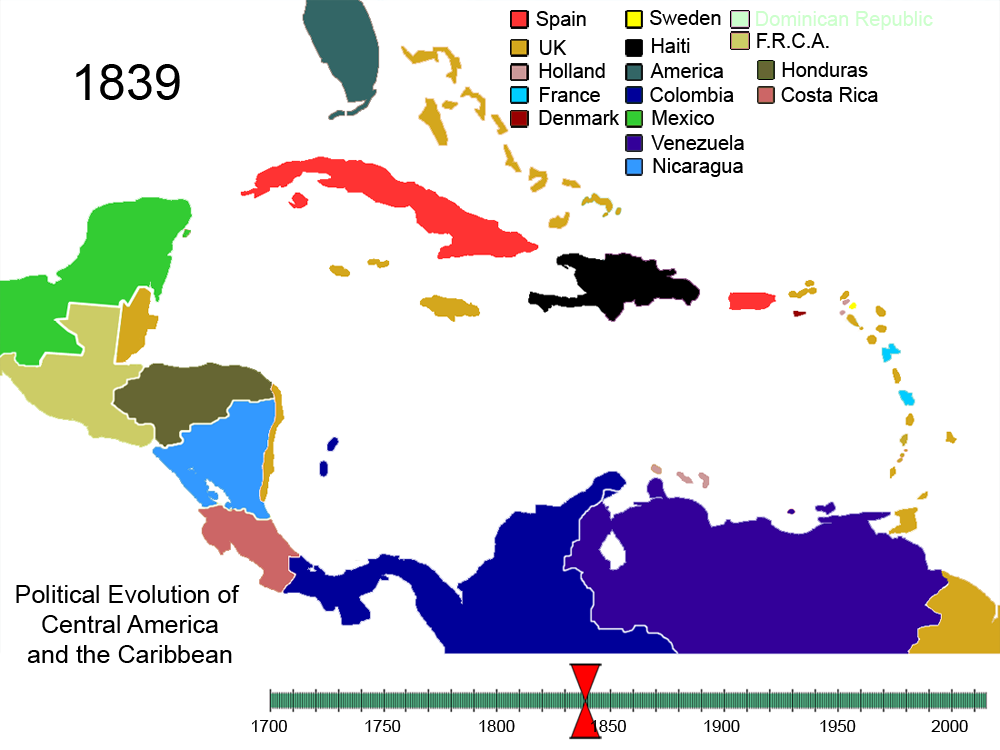
By 1839 Central America became five independent small nations

After the breaking of the Federal Pact in 1838, Honduras and Nicaragua declared war on El Salvador, where the federal government was located. Morazán in El Salvador was fighting on two fronts: against Guatemala and against Honduras. He invaded and occupied Guatemala again in 1838, but without being able to hold it, and thus, always victorious on the battlefield, he was unable to face the strength of his enemies leave a permanent work, nor avoid chaos.

Not achieving his victorious day of 1838 nothing other than accentuate the differences between Guatemalans and Salvadorans.

While on the part of Honduras, General Francisco Ferrera, who became chief of the army of his country, invaded El Salvador with a contingent of 1,500 Hondurans and Nicaraguans, who were easily defeated by the Morazan troops, inferior in number, on April 5, 1839, in El Espíritu Santo, colonel dying in action Colombian Benítez, one of Morazán's most loyal collaborators.

Ferrera requested new reinforcements from Nicaragua and organized "the peacekeeping army of Central America», with which he invaded El Salvador again, reaching Cojutepeque, but was defeated in San Pedro Perulapán by the federal army, under the command of Morazán, on September 25, 1839.

The triumph of San Pedro was the last hope of the federals. Jose Trinidad Cabañas, second of Morazán and future president of Honduras, invaded his country and occupied Comayagua and Tegucigalpa, forcing the separatist authorities to withdraw to Olancho, but on January 31, 1840, he was defeated in the Llano del Potrero and two months later the same Morazán was decisively defeated in Guatemala, which he invaded for the last time in a vain attempt to revive the dying Federation.

The defeat of Morazán in Guatemala and that of Cabañas in Honduras marked the end of the Central American unity.

== Consequences ==
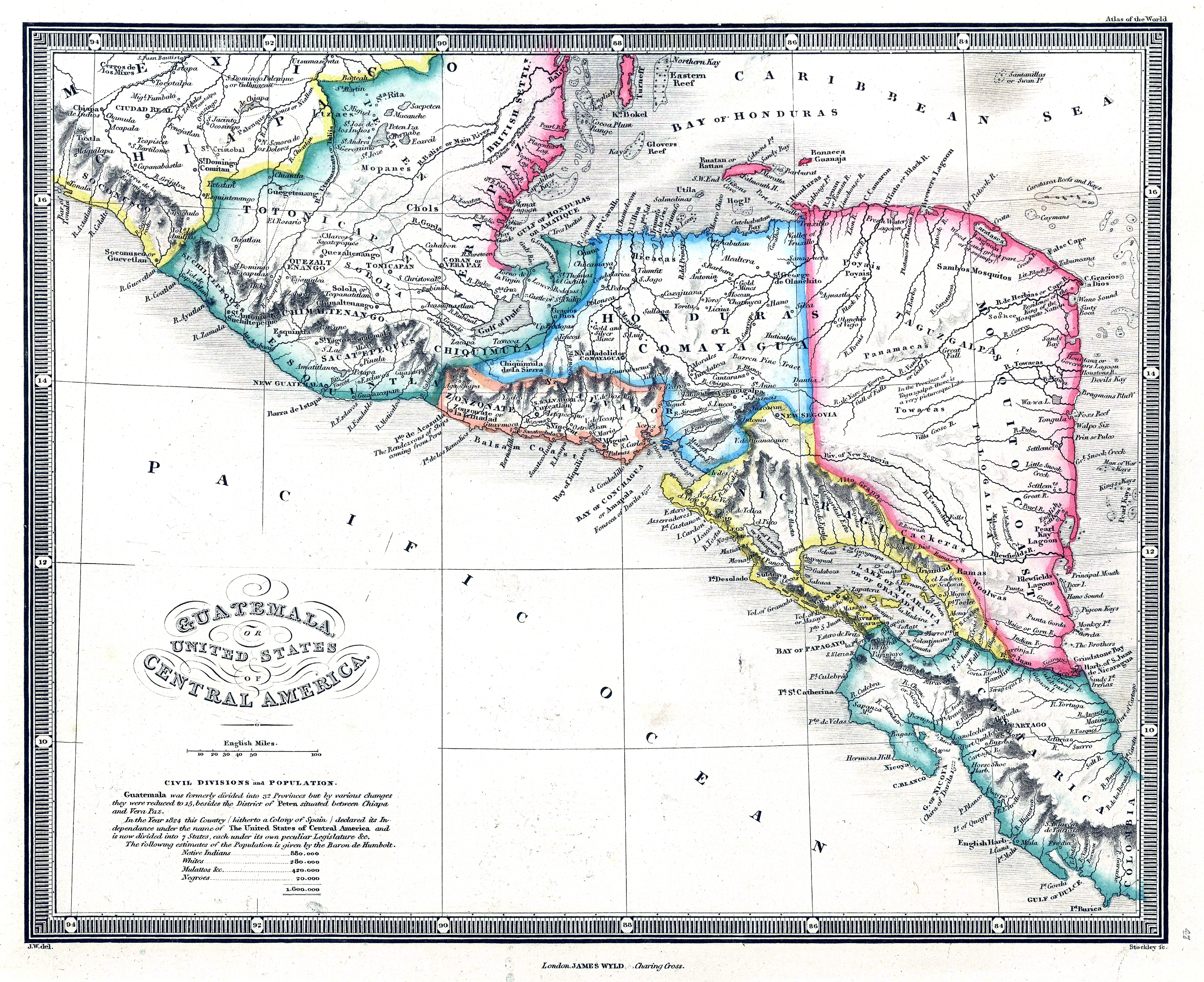
Federal Republic of Central America; with the exception of the Kingdom of Mosquitia, which was a British Protectorate until 1860.

Morazán returned to San Salvador, and although welcomed with respect, he was defeated and he considered it preferable to choose the path of ostracism, marching with a group of his supporters to settle in David, which was then part of the Republic of Colombia.

On February 1, 1841, El Salvador also declared itself separated from the federal pact, which was already a fact since the Armistice of Saint Vincent with Honduras, on June 5, 1839, had established in its article 8.9 that "The Contracting States, they mutually guarantee their independence, sovereignty and freedom."

The dissolution of the Federation offered a unique opportunity for the ambitions of foreign powers to expand their domains at the expense of the dissolved nationality reduced to five divided and weak States.

On April 20, 1839, the United Kingdom occupied the island of Roatán, on the coast of Honduras, and Mexico occupied Soconusco, on the border with Guatemala, in 1842.

The greatest danger came from Great Britain, which saw the opportunity to recover the territory lost in the first national war sixty years before.

In a last attempt to reunite Central America, Francisco Morazán, invaded Costa Rica and was president of that nation until a rebellion broke out and he was executed.
