= José Justo Milla =

First Vice President of Honduras

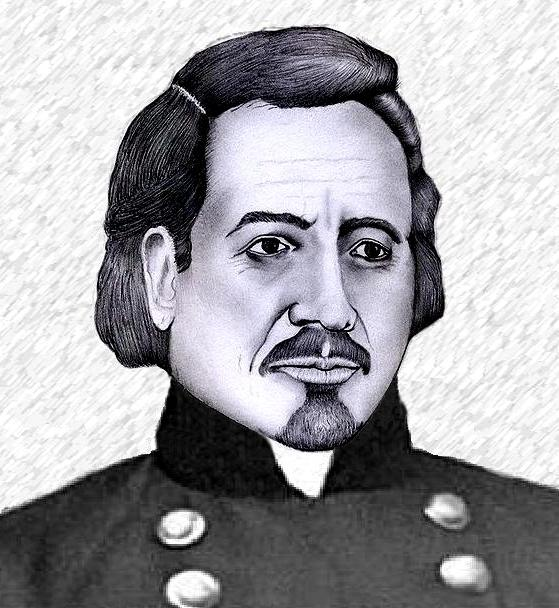
José Justo Milla

José Justo Milla Pineda (1794 in Gracias – 1838) was a Honduran military leader who was the governor of the state of Honduras within the Federal Republic of Central America from 10 May 1827 to 13 September 1827. He was a member of the Liberal Party of Honduras. He fled his office in 1827 after losing to Francisco Morazán in the Battle of La Trinidad. Justo Milla spent the remainder of his life in Mexico, where he died, never living to see the dissolution of the Central American Republic and the independence of Honduras.
