= José Alejandro de Aycinena =

Politician and military personnel (1767–1826)

Colonel José Alejandro de Aycinena
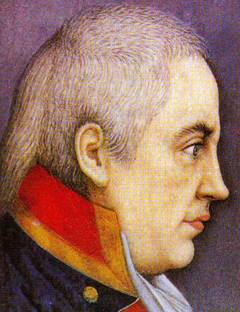

Colonial Intendant of San Salvador
- In office 3 December 1811 – August 1812; Provisional Colonial Intendant
- Monarch: José I
- Preceded by: José Batres y Asturias
- Succeeded by: José Peinado y Pezonarte

Personal details
- Born: 24 April 1767 Antigua Guatemala, Guatemala, Spanish Empire
- Died: 26 May 1826 (aged 59)
- Party: Independent
- Spouse: Mariana de Micheo y Delgado
- Children: 1
- Relatives: Aycinena Family
- Education: Universidad de San Carlos de Guatemala
- Occupation: Military, politician

Military service
- Allegiance: Spain
- Branch/service: Spanish Army
- Rank: Colonel
- Commands: Infantry Militias
- Battles/wars: 1811 Independence Movement

José Alejandro de Aycinena y Carrillo (24 April 1767 – 26 May 1826) was a Spanish military officer and politician who served as the Colonial Intendant of the Intendancy of San Salvador from 1811 to 1812.

== Early and personal life ==
José Alejandro de Aycinena y Carrillo was born on 24 April 1767 in Antigua Guatemala, Guatemala, which was then a part of the Spanish Empire. His father was Juan Fermín de Aycinena e Irigoyen (es), a member of the conservative Aycinena Family (es), and his mother was Ana María Carrillo y Gálvez de Corral. He was the Rector of the M. I. University of Guatemala and the Attorney of the Real Audiencia of Guatemala.

== Military career ==
Aycinena y Carrillo was a Colonel in the Spanish Army and was in command of the Milicias de Infantería (Infantry Militias). On 5 November 1811, 400 Salvadorans led by José Matías Delgado and Manuel José Arce in the Intendancy of San Salvador declared independence and overthrew its Colonial Intendant, Antonio Gutiérrez y Ulloa. Gutiérrez y Ulloa was replaced by José Mariano Batres y Asturias by the independence leaders. Aycinena y Carrillo was sent into San Salvador to crush the rebellion. On 3 December 1811, after suppressing the independence movement, Aycinena y Carrillo became the Colonial Intendant of San Salvador to bring "tranquility and betterment" to the intendancy. His term as Colonial Intendant ended in August 1812 when he was elected as Advisor of the State of the Real Audiencia of Guatemala, being replaced by José María Peinado y Pezonarte.

== Death ==
Aycinena y Carrillo died on 26 May 1826.

Political offices
Preceded by José Batres y Asturias (provisional)	Colonial Intendant of San Salvador; 1811–1812 (provisional)	Succeeded by José Peinado y Pezonarte
