= Albert Planasdemunt i Gubert =

Spanish politician (1929–2021)

Member of the Parliament of Catalonia
- In office 10 April 1980 – 20 March 1984
- Constituency: Girona

Mayor of Breda
- In office 23 May 1983 – 25 May 1991
- Preceded by: Jordi Puiggalí i Llorca
- Succeeded by: Jordi Iglesias Salip

Member of the Diputació de Girona
- In office 1979–1980

Personal details
- Born: 17 November 1929 Breda, Spain
- Died: 18 May 2021 (aged 91)
- Party: CDS

Albert Planasdemunt I Gubert (17 November 1929 – 18 May 2021) was a Spanish politician. A member of the Democratic and Social Centre, he served in the Parliament of Catalonia from 1980 to 1984.

== Biography ==
Planasdemunt studied to be a mechanical technician and began working as an industrialist. In the 1979 Spanish local elections, he became a member of the municipal council of Breda as part of the Centrists of Catalonia. He served in the Diputació de Girona from 1979 to 1980 before representing the Province of Girona in the Catalan Parliament following his victory in the 1980 Catalan regional election.

In 1982, he became President of the Democratic and Social Centre in the Catalan Parliament, but successfully ran for Mayor of Breda in 1983 as an independent. He was re-elected in 1987 and rejoined the municipal council in 1991. He retired following the 2011 Spanish local elections but continued as a substitute.

Albert Planasdemunt I Gubert died on 18 May 2021 at 91.
