= Intendancy of San Salvador =

Administrative division of New Spain

Intendancy of San Salvador Intendencia de San Salvador
- 1785–1821
- Flag Coat of arms

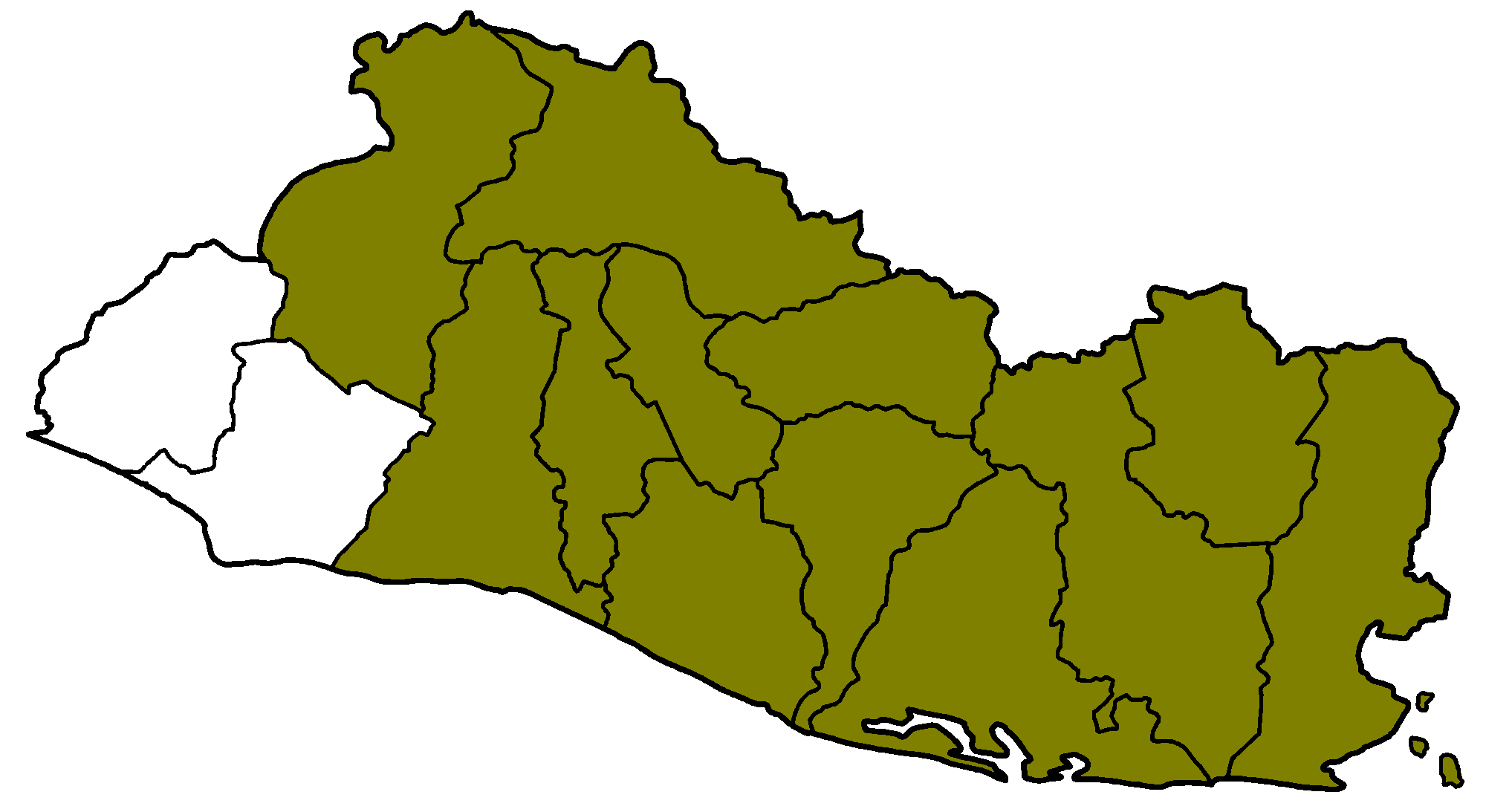
- Territory controlled by the intendancy is shaded.
- Status: Spanish colony
- Capital: San Salvador
- Common languages: Spanish
- Religion: Roman Catholicism
- Government: Intendancy
- King
  - 1785–1788: Charles III
  - 1788–1808: Charles IV
  - : 1808–1808, 1813–1821: Ferdinand VII
  - 1808–1813: Joseph I
- Colonial Intendant
  - 1786–1789: José Ortiz de la Peña (first)
  - 1819–1821: Pedro Barriere (last)
- Historical era: Bourbon Reforms
  - Established: 1785
  - Independence of Central America: 15 September 1821
  - Disestablished: 21 September 1821

Population
  - 1778: 117,436
  - 1800: 145,906
Preceded by	Succeeded by
Greater Mayorship of San Salvador	Province of San Salvador
- Today part of: El Salvador

The Intendancy of San Salvador (Spanish: Intendencia de San Salvador) was an administrative division of the Captaincy General of Guatemala, itself an administrative division of the Viceroyalty of New Spain which was a part of the Spanish Empire.

The intendancy was formed in 1785 as a part of the Bourbon Reforms and was formed along with the intendancies of Ciudad Real, Comayagua, and León. It was dissolved in 1821 following the signing of the Act of Independence of Central America on 15 September of that year that established the United Provinces of Central America, which San Salvador joined as a province.

== History ==
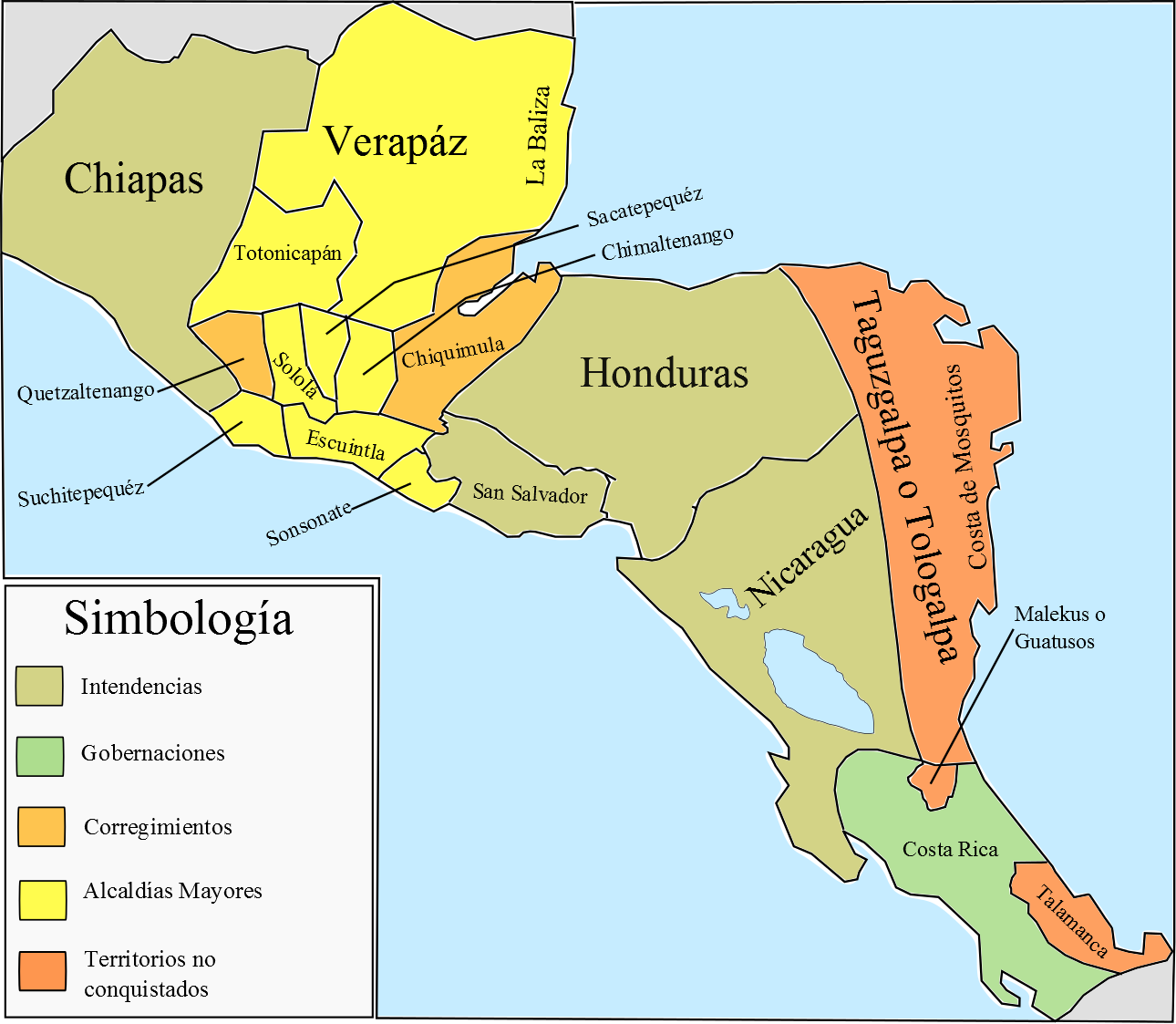
The Intendancy of San Salvador and the rest of the Captaincy General of Guatemala at the beginning of the 19th century

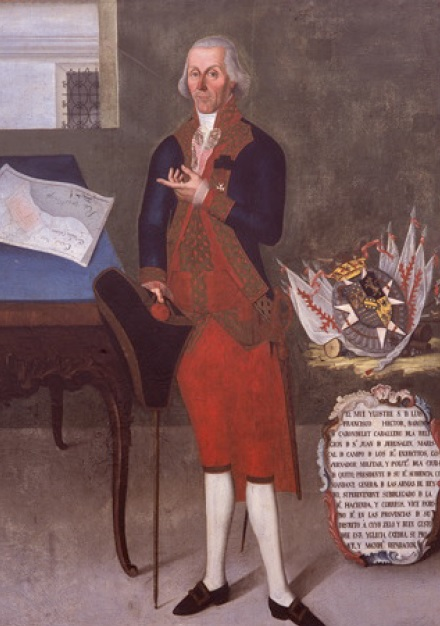
Francisco Luis Héctor de Carondelet, intendant of San Salvador from 1789 to 1791

=== Establishment ===
Prior to 1785, the region of modern-day El Salvador was governed by the Greater Mayorship of San Salvador, a remnant of Habsburg rule in the area. During the Bourbon Reforms of the late 1700s, reformists sought to reorganize the relationship between the Spanish Crown and the colonies that made up the Spanish Empire by further centralizing governance of the colonies and taking away autonomy from wealthy elites, but the attempts at such reforms caused resistance among Creoles that began gaining influence in Spanish governance. As a part of the reform, the Intendancy of San Salvador was created, as were the intendancies of Ciudad Real, Comayagua, and León, which took away significant amounts of power and influence of the Captaincy General of Guatemala in the areas affected.

=== Late 18th century (1785–1800) ===
The Intendancy of San Salvador was created by royal decree issued by the monarch Charles III of Spain on September 17, 1785, as part of the Bourbon Reforms, which sought to improve Spanish administration over the colonies through the centralization of administrative functions in the office of intendant and through economic and social reforms implemented by the Bourbon dynasty upon its accession to the Spanish throne with Philip V.

To exercise the office of first intendant, the Royal Audiencia of Guatemala selected the licentiate José Ortiz de la Peña, who had previously served as an oidor (a judicial official) of the Royal Audiencia of Guatemala; the reason for his selection was that, as an oidor, he had studied the problems of tax collection, labor, and the cultivation of indigo (which was the principal product produced in the territory of the intendancy and the main export product of the Captaincy General of Guatemala) and was therefore considered capable of stimulating indigo cultivation while ensuring that landowners had labor and paid taxes. Ortiz held the office as governor-intendant (which implied military command) and was responsible for organizing the territory.

In 1789, Francisco Luis Héctor de Carondelet was appointed governor-intendant. He worked to stabilize the territory, pursued smuggling along the coasts, fought piracy (fortifying ports and strategic locations), attempted to reorganize the militias, freed agriculture from judicial obstacles, introduced silkworm cultivation, requested the removal of the tobacco monopoly, reorganized the indigo growers' board as a mortgage bank, established a vaccination board, set population policies, protected consumers, regulated weights and measures used by vendors, attempted to regulate the sale of crown lands, established primary and artisan schools, and founded the town of Dulce Nombre de María.

In 1791, Carondelet was replaced by José Antonio María de Aguilar. He was the first legal advisor appointed in this intendancy and the first to exercise the office as corregidor-intendant; the change in title was due to the fact that the office did not include military command. He held the position until 1793.

In 1794, the ship El Activo, commanded by Lieutenant Salvador Meléndez y Bruna (a member of the nautical and cartographic expedition of Alejandro Malaspina), arrived in the Gulf of Fonseca and explored and mapped the Salvadoran coast; in his diary, he noted that cannonballs fired by the galleons of the South Sea Armada in 1688 were embedded in the rocks at the southwestern end of Meanguera.

In 1793, Ignacio Santiago Ulloa was appointed corregidor-intendant, serving until his death on January 1, 1798. After Ulloa's death, the intendancy was governed by provisional intendants, which allowed criollos to hold different offices; the first of these provisional intendants was José Antonio María de Aguilar, who held the office for a second time until his death on September 15, 1799, and was succeeded by Bernardo José de Arce (who was also the father of Manuel José Arce (first president of Central America) and himself a figure in the Central American independence movement through his participation in later independence movements in San Salvador), who served until 1800.

=== 1800–1821 ===
In 1798, the king had appointed Luis de Arguedas as intendant, but he was unable to take office due to health problems; thus in 1800 the Guatemalan Royal Audiencia appointed the treasurer Luis Martínez Navarrete as interim intendant, and Antonio Isidro Palomo as legal advisor. In 1801 Navarrete left office for health reasons, and the San Salvador city council protested so that the first-vote alcalde ordinario would serve as interim intendant (and not the legal advisor); this was done, with Ventura Calera serving in 1801, followed in subsequent years by José Rosi and Buenaventura de Viteri. Antonio Isidro Palomo exercised the office in the period between the end of one municipal term and the assumption of the next. In 1804 the Guatemalan Royal Audiencia appointed Francisco Vallejo as interim intendant.

In 1804, Antonio Gutiérrez y Ulloa assumed the office of intendant (who would be the first officially appointed by the king since 1798); he wrote the book Estado general de la Provincia de San Salvador, in which he described the condition of the populations that formed part of the intendancy, presenting the information in two parts, the first published in 1807 and the second in 1811.

==== French occupation of Spain, independence movements, and the Constitution of Cádiz ====
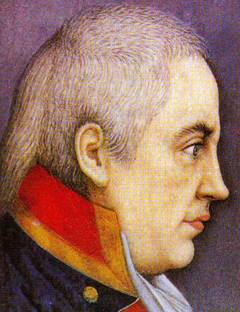
Colonel José Alejandro de Aycinena, who was chosen by the San Salvador city council as candidate for the draw to elect the member of the Supreme Central Junta, and who was intendant of San Salvador from December 3, 1811 to June 25, 1812

In 1808, Spain was invaded by the troops of Napoleon Bonaparte, and the royal family was imprisoned; shortly thereafter, the Supreme Central Junta was formed to fight the French. This news reached the intendancy in October of that year, and the different authorities swore loyalty to the new government; likewise, voluntary donations were offered to finance the war against the French.

===== Election of member to the Supreme Central Junta and deputy to the Cortes =====
On January 22, 1809, the Supreme Central Junta called on the municipal councils to select by lot a candidate, who would compete (together with those chosen by the other councils) in a draw at the seat of their Royal Audiencia, in order to designate a representative to the junta.

In the San Salvador council (presided over by alcaldes ordinarios Gregorio de Castraciones and Ventura Calera), a selection was made among Vicente de Aycinena (marquis of Aycinena), Colonel José Alejandro de Aycinena, Bernardo José Pavón, and José Matías Delgado, with Colonel José de Aycinena being chosen; in Santa Ana (presided over by alcaldes José Vicente Vides and José Miguel Cárcamo), a selection was made among José Miguel de Cárcamo, José Ciriaco Méndez, and Domingo Figueroa, with Figueroa being chosen; in San Miguel (led by José María de Hoyos and José Manuel Escolán), a draw was held among Miguel Barroeta, Rafael Barroeta, and Manuel Antonio de Molina, with Miguel Barroeta being selected; and in San Vicente (with alcaldes José María Cevallos and Ramón Quintanilla), a selection was made among Manuel Antonio de Molina, the marquis of Aycinena, Joaquín Arechavala, and José Cecilio del Valle, with the latter being chosen.

The final draw among the candidates was held in Guatemala in November, and was won by Alejandro Ramírez (candidate of the councils of Sonsonate, Comayagua, and Granada); however, due to his resignation, another draw was held in March 1810. Likewise, the resignation of Valle required the San Vicente council (led by alcaldes Manuel Jiménez Basurto and Antonio José Cañas) to hold a new draw in January among Manuel Antonio de Molina, José Matías Delgado, and Jacobo de Villa Urrutia, with Molina being selected. Finally, in the definitive draw in Guatemala in March, Bernardo Pavón was selected; however, he was unable to make the journey, as the Supreme Central Junta was replaced by the Council of Regency of Spain and the Indies.

The Council of Regency ordered on February 14, 1810 that the municipal councils (which were provincial capitals) select by lot a deputy to the Cortes of Cádiz, intended to draft the first Spanish constitution. News of the call reached the Kingdom of Guatemala in June of that year; thus, on June 26, with José Matías Delgado, Manuel José Arce, and José Ignacio Ávila as candidates, the San Salvador council chose Ávila as deputy; he traveled to Spain in 1811, took office on July 11 of that year, and was one of the deputies who promulgated the Constitution of Cádiz on March 12, 1812.

===== Independence movements and the Constitution of Cádiz =====
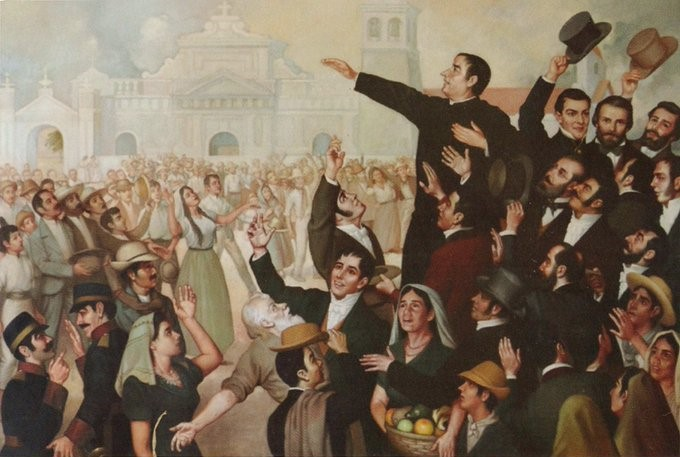
Painting by Luis Vergara Ahumada showing the priest José Matías Delgado encouraging the population during the first independence movement of 1811

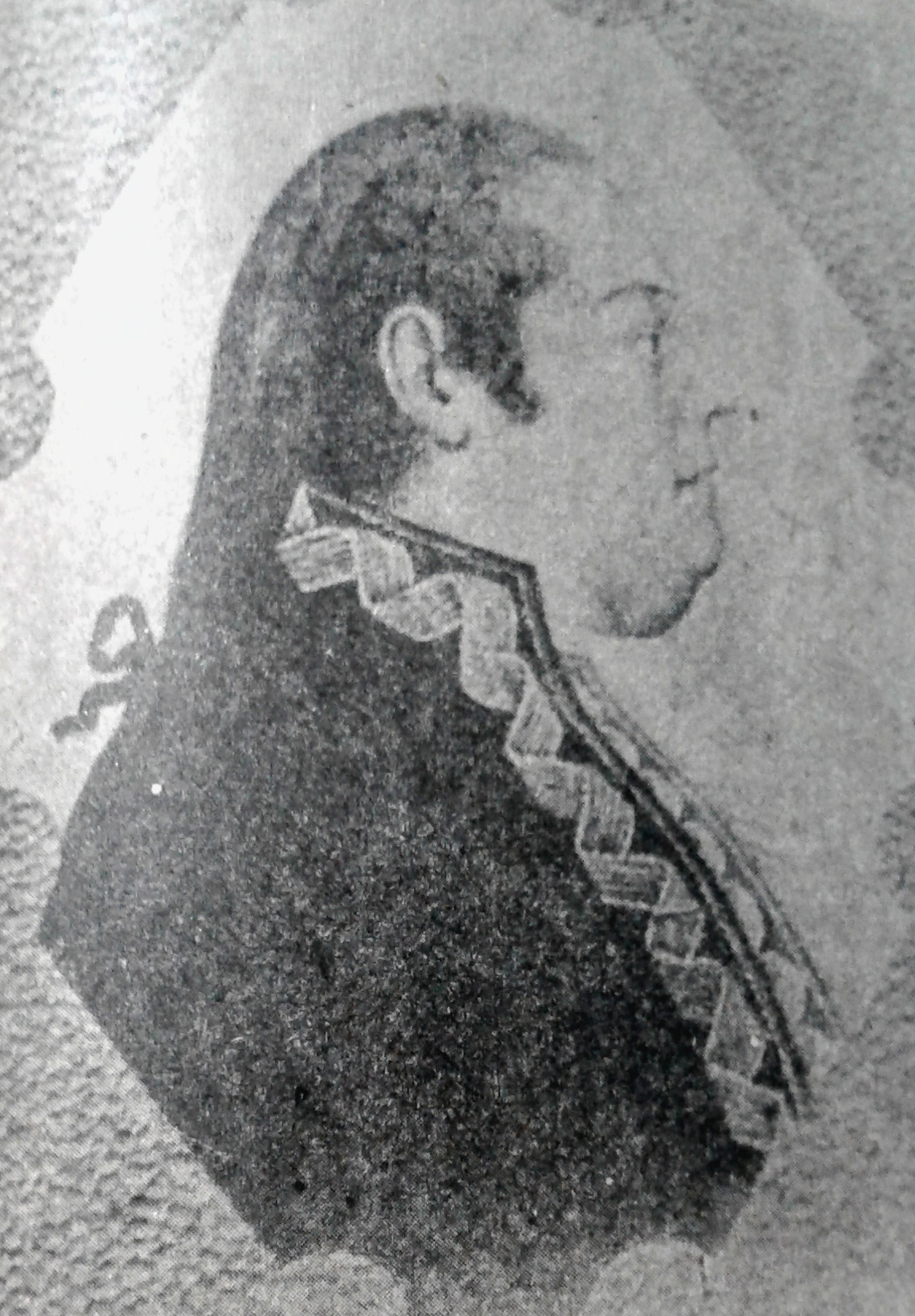
José María Peinado, intendant of San Salvador from 1812 to 1814 and from 1818 to 1819

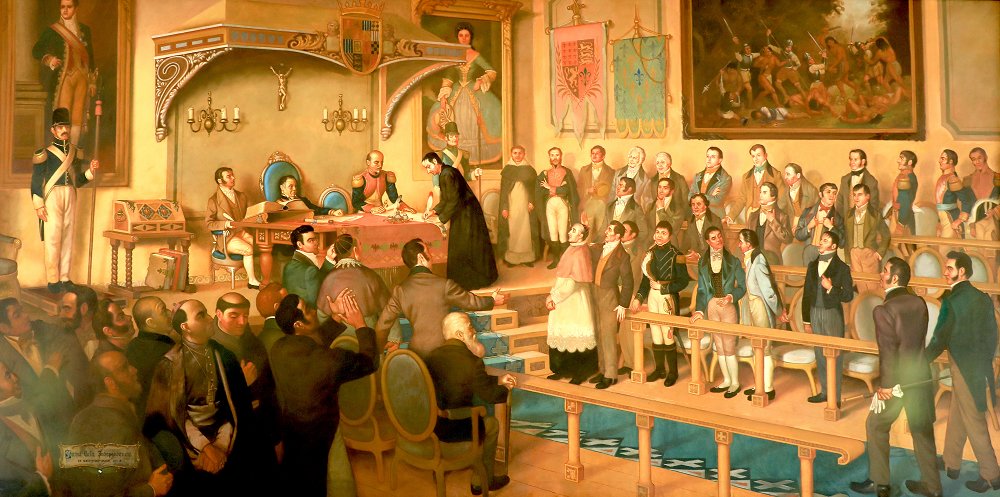
The signing of the Act of Independence of Central America.

On June 9, 1810, the tribunal of fidelity was established in Guatemala City, composed of artillery commander José Méndez de Quiroga, oidor Joaquín Bernardo Campusano, and war auditor Joaquín Ibáñez; it handled all cases of sedition against the Spanish Crown. The tribunal existed until February 20, 1811, and among those sentenced were Justo Zaldívar and Valentín Porras, from San Alejo, who were imprisoned and had their property confiscated in 1810 for promoting independence ideas.

On 5 November 1811, the First independence movement of San Salvador overthrew intendant Antonio Gutiérrez y Ulloa and José Mariano Batres y Asturias replaced him as interim intendant. This in turn led to independence uprisings in other towns. In december, the movement ended with the suppression of the uprisings and the surrender of the rebels in San Salvador after negotiations with the delegation sent from Guatemala to pacify the intendancy, composed of Colonel José Alejandro de Aycinena who took office as new intendant on 3 December 1811, José María Peinado as representative of the Guatemalan council, and the priest Mariano Vidaurre. Aycinena suppressed remnants of the independence movement and left the office of intendant after being elected Councillor of State, resigning theintendancy in 1812 in favor of José María Peinado y Pezonarte, who was appointed in his place. During his administration, on September 16, 1812, a copy of the Constitution of Cádiz arrived in San Salvador, and celebrations for the event were held on October 8. According to that text, all persons born in Spanish dominions (including indigenous peoples and mestizos) were citizens, and all settlements with more than 1,000 inhabitants became municipalities with their own councils. Peinado y Pezonarte governed San Salvador until he was replaced by José Méndez de Quiroga during the 1814 Independence Movement. He was in office until 1817 when he was succeeded by two interim intendants: Juan Miguel de Bustamante, who served from 1817 to 1818, and Simón Gutiérrez, who only served in 1818.

By decree of the Cortes of May 23, the former Captaincy General of Guatemala was divided politically into two provinces (Guatemala and Nicaragua and Costa Rica), with the Intendancy of San Salvador remaining within Guatemala; the intendants would thereafter also hold the title of political chief.

In 1813, the first elections to the Cortes were held, and Manuel José Arce was elected as deputy, but he was unable to travel to Spain due to lack of funds. Elections were also held for the provincial deputation of Guatemala, and José Matías Delgado was elected for San Salvador; the deputation began its sessions on September 2 of that year.

At the beginning of 1814, the second independence movement took place, which was less successful than the previous one. Miguel de Larreynaga was also elected as deputy to the Cortes, but was unable to travel due to King Ferdinand VII restoring the pre-1808 system of government.

==== Return of absolutism, and later restoration of the Constitution of Cádiz ====
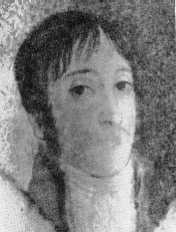
Pedro Barriere, last intendant of San Salvador from 1819 to 1821

On May 4, 1814, the Constitution of Cádiz was repealed and absolute monarchy was restored; because Peinado had helped draft the instructions to the deputy to the Cortes of Guatemala, he was removed from office, and the position passed to José Méndez de Quiroga until his death in 1817, being replaced provisionally by the legal lieutenant Juan Miguel de Bustamante until 1818, when he was replaced by Simón Gutiérrez; in that same year of 1818, José María Peinado was again appointed intendant, serving until his death in 1819, when he was replaced by Pedro Barriere.

In the intendancy, as in the rest of Spanish America, the return to absolutism in 1814 was seen as a political regression. Intellectuals again feared the tribunal of the Holy Office, freedom of the press was suppressed, indigenous communities were again required to pay tribute, and landowners were disillusioned by the destruction of the possibility of independence from the monopoly of large merchants.

Peinado y Pezonarte reassumed office in 1818 but died in office in 1819. He was succeeded by Pedro Barriere.

On March 10, 1820, the Constitution of Cádiz came back into force, leading to the reestablishment of the 1813 provincial deputation of Guatemala (with José Matías Delgado as deputy for San Salvador); elections were held for deputies to the Cortes, and for this occasion the intendancy was divided into two electoral provinces (San Salvador and San Miguel), with José María Álvarez and José Matías Delgado elected. Álvarez ultimately became deputy for the entire intendancy, but died before traveling to Spain and was replaced by San Salvador councilman Mariano Gómez, who also could not travel due to lack of funds. Later, on September 19, 20, and 21, elections were held for deputies to the provincial deputation of Guatemala, organizing the intendancy into two electoral districts: San Salvador and San Miguel; José Matías Delgado was again elected for San Salvador, and for San Miguel the priest Manuel Antonio de Molina; the deputation was installed on November 7.

On May 8, 1821, the Spanish Cortes issued a decree establishing provincial deputations in overseas intendancies where they did not exist. As a result, the intendancy became the Province of San Salvador.

On 15 September 1821, José Cecilio del Valle, José Matías Delgado, Gabino Gaínza, and other Central American leaders drafted and signed the Act of Independence of Central America in Guatemala City, declaring the independence of the Central American provinces of Guatemala, San Salvador, Honduras, Nicaragua, and Costa Rica from Spain and establishing the United Provinces of Central America. With this act, the Province of San Salvador proclaimed its independence together with the entire Captaincy General of Guatemala, with Pedro Barriere as the last colonial intendant. On 21 September 1821, the Intendancy of San Salvador accepted the declaration of independence and was dissolved; it became the Province of San Salvador, a part of the United Provinces of Central America, (Note: Later known as the Federal Republic of Central America.) with Barriere as its political chief. He served as political chief until 28 November 1821.

== Governance ==
=== Overview ===
When the mayorship was transformed into an intendancy in 1785, Mayor Manuel Fradique y Goyena remained in his position until 1786 when he was replaced by José Ortiz de la Peña as the first colonial intendant. He was replaced by Francisco Luis Héctor de Carondelet in 1789. During his tenure, indigo production decreased as a result of the reduction of the local indigenous population. He recruited Spanish laborers to do the work of the indigenous people, which later resulted in a significant increase of a lighter-skinned populace in northern El Salvador today, notably in the Chalatenango Department, who are the descendants of the laborers. He was considered the "best colonial intendant" of San Salvador during the intendancy.

In 1791, Carondelet became the governor of the Governate of Louisiana and was replaced by José Antonio María de Aguilar, who only served two years, and was replaced by Ignacio Santiago Ulloa in 1793. Ulloa died on 1 January 1798 and was succeeded by eight interim intendants from 1798 until 1805 when Antonio Gutiérrez y Ulloa was appointed as intendant.

=== Intendant ===
The Spanish monarch, following recommendations of the Council of the Indies, selected a male individual to govern as intendant. Initially the office was that of governor-intendant and later corregidor-intendant, as it was considered not to have a military function; after the independence movement of 1814, the title reverted to governor-intendant. They were generally appointed for a period of five years and received a salary of 4,000 pesos annually.

Each of them was originally from Spain, and thus had to undertake the journey to America (which took around five months); after which they presented themselves at the seat of the Guatemalan Royal Audiencia, where they paid the media anata (a payment used for the juicio de residencia at the end of the term for which they had been appointed; all officials were subject to this trial so that their administration could be investigated and reported to the monarch and the Council of the Indies), after which they took the oath of office and were sent to the capital of the intendancy, where they appeared before the cabildo to assume their post.

Their powers, according to the Ordinance of Intendants of New Spain of 1786 (which was the legal basis of this intendancy), were stipulated in the so-called four causes, which were: treasury, justice, war, and police. Of these, the treasury was the primary cause for the establishment of the intendancies, whose purpose was to achieve better administration of the royal treasuries; the causes of justice and war referred to the judicial and governmental functions previously performed by the alcaldes mayores; and the cause of police referred to the promotion of the province's progress.

Among their functions were: presiding over the cabildo of the capital; distributing crown lands with the approval of the Superior Treasury Board (which, presided over by the president-governor and captain general of Guatemala, in his capacity as superintendent of the treasury, was the highest authority in matters of justice, treasury, military affairs, finances, etc.); personally visiting all the towns each year; ordering the preparation of maps of their jurisdiction; promoting industry, agriculture, trade, construction, and reconstruction of bridges, churches, and roads; ensuring that the local magistrates kept their towns orderly and sanitary; ensuring the eradication of idlers; ensuring the effective collection of tribute in indigenous towns; confirming the new alcaldes of municipal councils and indigenous cabildos; supplying the troops; and, in matters of justice, acting as judges of second instance (hearing appeals of decisions already issued), having the first appeal (the second being the Royal Audiencia of Guatemala), and exercising first instance in cases of treasury and war.

One of the functions that, according to the 1786 ordinance of intendants, they were supposed to have and could not exercise was the vice-patronage (authority to authorize religious leaders); this was due to opposition from the archbishopric of Guatemala, in order to prevent the formation of a bishopric in San Salvador, and the consequent loss of tithes (a 10 percent tax on produced goods, which went to the seat of the diocese and archdiocese).

=== Government officials ===
To assist him in his administrative and judicial functions, the intendant had a legal lieutenant and ordinary advisor; this was a jurist who represented the intendant, advised him on legal matters, and performed the functions of a judge of first instance; and in the absence of the intendant, he assumed the government. Initially these were peninsular lawyers, but gradually creole lawyers also held the position. From 1786 to 1821 the legal advisors of the intendancy were José Antonio María de Aguilar, Antonio Isidro Palomo, Juan Miguel de Bustamante, Isidro Marín, and Pedro Barriere.

With regard to the Royal Treasury, there were two ministers in charge of the royal treasuries who transmitted the orders and rulings of the intendant in this matter. In addition to them, there were: the administrations of alcabalas and Barlovento, which consisted of a respective chief, an interventor, a supervisor or vista, an official, a clerk, a chief revenue guard, six roving guards, twelve receiving offices, and fourteen commissariats in the districts or partidos; the promoter of the Royal Treasury, who was a jurist representing the interests of the crown in any litigation; four notaries; a mortgage official; four procurator officials; the administrations of the monopolies of mail, tobacco, gunpowder, and playing cards; the Government Board (composed of the intendant, the treasurer and accountant of the royal treasuries; in which the administrators of the aforementioned monopolies also participated), which met once a week to coordinate financial administration and address fiscal problems; and the Royal Treasury Board (composed of the intendant, legal advisor, administrators of the royal treasuries, and the fiscal promoter), which met occasionally to deal with matters concerning tax collection and whose consultations were sent to the Superior Treasury Board.

Other institutions were: the consular deputation, dependent on the Consulate of Commerce; the defender of pious works; the municipal board (one for each town council), intended to improve oversight of the assets of cities and towns, and which had its own steward of municipal revenues; the vaccination board; the consolidation board; and the directorate of the Montepío of indigo growers, responsible for providing credit to producers of that product, whose General Board (presided over by the intendant) operated with representation from the districts or partidos, the municipal councils, and growers, and whose directorate was composed of a director, a treasurer, an accountant, a secretary, and a clerk.

Initially, command of the militia was in the hands of the governor-intendant; however, when the title changed to corregidor-intendant, an official in Guatemala was appointed as commander, the last being Colonel José Rosi (commander of the militias from 1806 to 1821).

=== Subdelegates and deputy subdelegates ===
For better administration of the territory, the intendant appointed subdelegates of the Royal Treasury and deputy subdelegates in the different entities into which the territory was divided. Deputy subdelegates were assigned the four causes of their district (justice, police, treasury, and war), or, if the head town of their district had a municipal council, they handled only two causes (justice and police) while the alcaldes ordinarios handled the other two causes; on the other hand, subdelegates handled only two causes (treasury and war, and only in districts without deputy subdelegates or alcaldes could they exercise the other two causes).

Both subdelegates and deputy subdelegates had to be Spaniards (peninsular or creole), royal officials or alcaldes ordinarios were not eligible, and their term lasted five years. They were tasked with inspecting the finances of their jurisdictions and maintaining close correspondence with the intendant, and were subject to a juicio de residencia at the end of their term (as were the intendant and other royal officials). They were prohibited from distributing merchandise and from having a business.

=== Local governments ===
The function and organization of towns with municipal councils continued to be the same as under the previous mayor's office. In addition, these institutions promoted economic activity by proposing measures in plenary sessions, with the regidores responsible for implementing them.

The positions of regidor in the municipal council continued to be sold and auctioned publicly; by the beginning of the 19th century these cost 300 pesos for simple posts and 600 pesos for double posts in San Miguel and San Vicente, while in San Salvador they cost 400 pesos for simple posts and 800 pesos for double posts.

Municipal councils, as they had done during the time of the mayor's office, appointed alcaldes of the Santa Hermandad—gradually referred to as pedáneo alcaldes in documents—to administer justice in rural areas (towns, estates, valleys or hamlets, sites, etc.). Meanwhile, indigenous or ladino (mestizo, Afro-descendant, hispanicized indigenous, and poor Spanish) neighborhoods or settlements could have their own respective authorities (alcaldes, syndic, etc.), as in the previous mayor's office.

Due to the increase in the Spanish population, the intendant of San Salvador (under the authority granted by Article 40 of the ordinance of intendants) could appoint two local alcaldes, with ordinary civil jurisdiction, in those towns with many Spanish inhabitants; this meant that the traditional Spanish municipal councils (San Salvador, San Vicente, and San Miguel) began to lose jurisdiction over the territory of their former provinces.

Although indigenous cabildos continued to have the same functions and organization as in the previous mayor's office, they acquired important economic roles due to their human and agricultural resources. In fact, it was required that members of the cabildo be engaged in agriculture and industry.

=== Changes during the enforcement of the Spanish Constitution of 1812 ===
==== Intendant as subordinate political chief ====
During the first (between 1812 and 1814) and second (between 1820 and 1821) constitutional periods, due to the enforcement of the Constitution of Cádiz, and with the intendancy being part of the Province of Guatemala, the intendant also received the title of subordinate political chief. Subdelegates and deputy subdelegates did not undergo any change and continued to exercise the same functions until the establishment of judges of letters (as dictated by the Constitution), which did not occur during the existence of this intendancy.

As subordinate political chief, the intendant, according to the instruction of June 23, 1813, was responsible for: presiding over the municipal council (without vote except in the case of a tie) of the capital of the intendancy; serving as the channel through which the superior political chief (of Guatemala) communicated the laws to be published in the territory, ensuring their observance; serving as the channel through which the municipal councils of his territory communicated with the superior political chief and the provincial deputation; maintaining order and tranquility in the towns of his jurisdiction; submitting the accounts of the towns of his territory to the provincial accounting office of municipal revenues; and not undertaking any public works without the consent of the superior political chief.

==== Constitutional municipal councils ====
With the Constitution, towns with sufficient population had a constitutional municipal council, whose members were elected each year (with alcaldes and half of the regidores and procuradores síndicos replaced annually); elections were held in December, so that members would take office on January 1. As previously noted, the one located in San Salvador was presided over by the intendant as subordinate political chief. Members could be from all social classes and castes (the former indigenous, ladino, and neighborhood cabildos were abolished—especially in the second constitutional period—and replaced by this new jurisdiction, in which all could participate); they could also be elected as deputies or members of the provincial deputation.

In towns with populations of 1,000 inhabitants or more, there was a municipal council composed of two alcaldes, 8 to 12 regidores, and one procurador; while towns with populations between 1,000 and 100 inhabitants were led by one alcalde, 2 to 6 regidores, and one procurador.

To be a member of a municipal council, one had to: be a citizen in full exercise of rights; be at least 25 years old; have resided in the town for at least five years; not be a public employee appointed by the king (or the current central government), except for military personnel; and could not leave office without legal cause. Members could not hold office again until two years had passed.

Those towns with populations of 1,000 inhabitants or more had their own municipal council composed of two alcaldes, 8 to 12 regidores, and one procurador; while towns with populations between 1,000 and 100 inhabitants were led by one alcalde, 2 to 6 regidores, and one procurador; at the same time, during this period the alcalde or first-vote alcalde also served as district chiefs (replacing deputy subdelegates). However, the restoration of absolutism in 1814 reversed this measure until it was reinstated in 1820 with the return of the Constitution.

According to the instruction of 1813, constitutional municipal councils were responsible for: supervising the repair of streets and bridges, the cleaning of plazas, the functioning of markets and lighting, and the supply of food; promoting and supervising the formation of health boards and hospitals; maintaining communal lands and plantations; taking measures to ensure and protect persons and their property; administering municipal funds; collecting contributions; maintaining schools; promoting agriculture, commerce, and industry; overseeing troop lodging and supplies; providing continuous information to the superior political chief, sending him detailed reports every three months on the inhabitants of the province (as well as epidemics, health conditions, irregularities in hospitals, public works, and the annual renewal of their members); and coordinating with the superior political chief for the administration of grain warehouses, requesting additional funds, submitting annual accounts of local administration, and arranging troop lodging and supplies. If they caused grievances to residents, these could appeal to the superior political chief, who (after consulting the provincial deputation) could sanction the council if deemed appropriate.

They were responsible for administering civil and ordinary justice in first instance in those towns where no subdelegate or deputy subdelegate resided; this function, which had previously been exercised by alcaldes ordinarios, according to the Constitution was to be carried out by judges of letters, but since these were not established, municipal councils exercised it. In addition, they had to administer justice in disputes between plaintiff and defendant (as courts of peace).

==== Deputies ====
During both constitutional periods, elections were held to choose deputies to the Cortes; the priest José Ignacio Ávila was the only one who managed to travel and serve, and the only one designated by the San Salvador council (as he was elected in 1810 to be part of the Cortes that drafted the Constitution of 1812). In 1813 Manuel José Arce was elected; in 1814 Miguel de Larreynaga; and in 1820—in the second constitutional period—the priests José María Álvarez (who died and was replaced by Mariano Gómez) and José Matías Delgado were elected for San Salvador and San Miguel respectively; none of them managed to take part in the Cortes.

To be a deputy, according to the Constitution of 1812, one had to: be over 25 years old; have been born in the province or have resided in it for more than seven years; have sufficient annual income from one's own property. In addition, the deputy could belong to the secular or regular clergy.

==== Members of the provincial deputation of Guatemala ====
As members of the provincial deputation of Guatemala (which was responsible for promoting the economy and progress of the province), the intendancy elected: the priests José Matías Delgado and Manuel Antonio de Molina, the former in both constitutional periods (in 1813 for the entire intendancy and in 1820 for the electoral district of San Salvador) and the latter in the second constitutional period (for the electoral district of San Miguel) that preceded independence and the transformation of the intendancy into a province.

According to the Spanish Constitution of 1812, to be a member of the provincial deputation one had to: be over 25 years old, have been born or have resided in the province for at least seven years, be in full exercise of rights, and have sufficient means to live decently.

==== Elections ====
Elections, according to what was stipulated in the Constitution of 1812, were indirect, carried out in a multi-stage system composed of parish, district, and provincial assemblies.

For the election of deputies to the Cortes and members of the provincial deputation, citizens met in their respective parish, where they formed the parish assembly and proceeded to elect (by voice vote) compromisarios, whose number varied depending on the population (reaching up to 31 in the most populated); these met in a separate place to choose by secret ballot one to three or more parish electors. These electors then met in the council houses of the district capitals (in the intendancy there were two: San Salvador and San Miguel); they formed the district assemblies, generally presided over by the highest local authority; they elected by secret ballot and written slips the district electors. Finally, these went to the capital of the intendancy; they formed the provincial assembly, presided over by the subordinate political chief; and voted by writing on a list the person they supported; whoever received half plus one of the votes was elected as deputy, and likewise they chose an alternate; and the following day they elected the member of the provincial deputation.

In the case of constitutional municipal councils, the election was initially similar, with the difference that it was the citizens (in the parish assembly) who chose the parish electors, either by writing their name on slips of paper or by approaching the assembly table to tell the secretary whom they supported (the secretary recording it in the presence of the voter). The following day, the parish electors met, formed an assembly (together with the person presiding over the parish assembly), and secretly chose by written ballot the members of the municipal council.

== Administrative division ==
Subdelegations or partidos of the Intendancy of San Salvador.

Tenencias or districts of the Intendancy of San Salvador

The territory of the Intendancy of San Salvador was organized into subdelegations or partidos subdivided into tenencias (also called districts or partidos, this latter designation not to be confused with the true partidos mentioned above) composed of several towns that were within the municipal jurisdiction of the settlements with cabildo or municipal council: San Salvador, San Vicente, San Miguel, and Santa Ana (the latter from 1806).

In total, the intendancy was divided into 4 subdelegations, 17 tenencias, and about 127 towns. The subdelegations and the tenencias that composed them were:

- Subdelegation of Santa Ana: composed of the tenencias of Santa Ana and Metapán.
- Subdelegation of San Salvador: composed of the tenencias of San Salvador, Opico, Tejutla, Chalatenango, Cojutepeque, and Sensuntepeque.
- Subdelegation of San Vicente: composed of the tenencias of Olocuilta, Zacatecoluca, and San Vicente.
- Subdelegation of San Miguel: composed of the tenencias of San Miguel, Usulután, Gotera, and San Alejo.

The subdelegation of San Salvador was administered by the intendant himself, while in the other subdelegations a subdelegate of the Royal Treasury was appointed for their administration; on the other hand, each tenencia was led by a deputy subdelegate or by alcaldes ordinarios when it was the seat of a municipal council, the exception to this rule being the Metapán tenencia (which was administered by alcaldes appointed by the intendant, due to the wealth of its quarries; this situation persisted until 1810 when a deputy subdelegate was appointed), other exceptions to the rule were the tenencias of Zacatecoluca and Chalatenango, in which a subdelegate of the Royal Treasury was appointed for their administration. In total, the tenencias led by a deputy subdelegate (in addition to Metapán, from 1810) were: Cojutepeque, Olocuilta, Usulután, Gotera, San Alejo, Sensuntepeque, Opico, Tejutla; while the tenencias administered by their alcaldes (in addition to Metapán before 1810) were: San Salvador, San Vicente, San Miguel (these three by their respective alcaldes ordinarios) and Santa Ana (the latter from 1806 having its own municipal council presided over by alcaldes ordinarios).

== Economy ==
In 1782, the Spanish Crown reduced tariffs and fees obstructing trade between mainland Spain and the American colonies which greatly increased the imports and exports between Spain and its colonies. As a result, the economy and population of not only the Intendancy of San Salvador, but all of the colonies increased significantly. During Spanish rule, indigo was the intendancy's primary export that dominated the economy. Guatemala's power and economy were notably deprived, not only as a result of losing San Salvador in 1785, but also because the value of indigo exports it lost in the process were very significant.
