= Pedro Barriere =

Salvadoran politician

Colonel Pedro Barriere
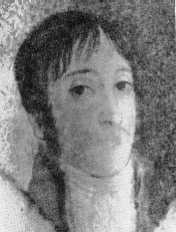

1st Political Chief of San Salvador
- In office 21 September 1821 – 28 November 1821
- Preceded by: Position established
- Succeeded by: José Matías Delgado

Colonial Intendant of San Salvador
- In office 1819 – 21 September 1821; Interim Colonial Intendant
- Monarch: Ferdinand VII
- Preceded by: José María Peinado
- Succeeded by: Position abolished

Personal details
- Born: Pedro Ortiz de la Barriere; 1768 Santo Domingo, Captaincy General of Santo Domingo
- Died: 18 May 1827 (aged 58–59) Milingo, El Salvador
- Spouse: Ana Paulina Pajares Palacios (m. 1812; died 1819)
- Occupation: Politician, military officer, lawyer

Military service
- Allegiance: Spain (until 1821); El Salvador (1821); Mexico (1822–?); Central America (1827)
- Years of service: 18th century – 1827
- Rank: Colonel
- Battles/wars: First Central American Civil War; Battle of Milingo †

Pedro Ortiz de la Barriere (1768 – 18 May 1827) was a Spanish politician, military officer, and lawyer who served as the colonial intendant of the Intendancy of San Salvador from 1819 until 1821. He also served the first head of state of the Province of San Salvador (modern-day El Salvador) after the signing of the Act of Independence of Central America from September to November 1821. He was killed in action at the Battle of Milingo during the First Central American Civil War.

== Early life ==
Pedro Ortiz de la Barriere was born in 1768 in Santo Domingo, Captaincy General of Santo Domingo, which was part of the Spanish Empire. His father was Pedro Barriere, who was of French descent, and his mother was Josefa de Castro, who was of Spanish descent. Barriere had six older siblings: Juana, Francisca, Josefa, Ana, María, and José. He graduated from the Saint Thomas Aquinas University in Santo Domingo where he earned his doctorate in 1796. Barriere moved to the Captaincy General of Cuba in November 1800 to work as a lawyer.

== Political career ==
Barriere entered the service of the colonial government at the end of the eighteenth century. On 3 December 1802, he was appointed as an advisor to the government of the Intendancy of San Salvador after the resignation of Manuel Clavijo, but it took until 17 April 1804 for him to assume office due to suspicions about his French ancestry. In 1813, Barriere was appointed as an advisor to the government of the Intendancy of Comayagua; he assumed office on 31 July 1813. In 1818, he returned to San Salvador and was given the additional duties of being the legal advisor to Colonial Intendant José María Peinado. At some point, Barriere attained the rank of lieutenant. In 1819, following Peinado's death, Barriere succeeded Peinado as colonial intendant in an interim capacity. On 15 September 1821, the Act of Independence of Central America was signed in Guatemala City, of which Barriere was a signatory; Barriere remained as the political chief of San Salvador and swore allegiance to Central American independence.

Various liberal political leaders called upon Barriere to hold elections to send representatives to the Consultive Junta—the Central American government—and in response, he called for the formation of a "junior economic and consultive junta" ("junta subalterna económica y consultiva"). On 4 October 1821, Barriere retracted his pledge to form a junta resulting in unrest; he ordered soldiers to disperse crowds of protestors and ordered the arrests of Manuel José Arce, Domingo Antonio de Lara, Juan Manuel Rodríguez, Manuel Castillo, and Mariano Fagoaga. Barriere sent those he had arrested to Guatemala, fearing that they would lead a popular revolution against him in El Salvador. Barriere sent a report of the incident to the Consultive Junta in Guatemala, and in response, on 11 October, the Consultive Junta named Salvadoran priest José Matías Delgado to replace Barriere as political chief in order to maintain peace in San Salvador and Delgado released the men who Barriere had arrested. Although Delgado was named as Barriere's successor on 11 October, Delgado did not actually replace Barriere until 28 November.

After being replaced as colonial intendant, Barriere moved to Guatemala and obtained the rank of colonel. On 19 April 1822, the government of the First Mexican Empire bestowed him the title of "Honorary Oidor of the Audiencia of Guatemala" for his service to the empire; on 2 July 1822, Barriere swore his allegiance to the empire.

== Death ==
During the First Central American Civil War, Barriere became an ally of Arce who had since become President of the Federal Republic of Central America. Barriere was killed in action during the Battle of Milingo near Suchitoto against Francisco Morazán's forces.

== Personal life ==
On 8 May 1812, Barriere married Ana Paulina Pajares Palacios, who was the daughter of Antonio Victoriano Pajares and Juana Felipa Palacios. Barriere had two step children: Antonio and Juana. Pajares died in 1819.

== See also ==
- President of El Salvador

Political offices
New office	Political Chief of San Salvador; 1821	Succeeded by José Matías Delgado
Preceded by José María Peinado	Colonial Intendant of San Salvador (interim); 1819–1821	Office abolished
