= Antonio Gutiérrez y Ulloa =

Spanish politician and bureaucrat

5th Colonial Intendant of San Salvador
- In office 28 June 1805 – 5 November 1811
- Monarchs: Carlos IV (until 1808); Fernando VII (1808); José I (from 1808)
- Preceded by: Antonio Isidro Palomo
- Succeeded by: José Batres y Asturias

Personal details
- Born: 14 June 1771; Toro, Spain
- Died: 1831 (aged 59–60)
- Occupation: Politician

Antonio Basilio Gutiérrez y Ulloa (14 June 1771 – 1831) was a Spanish politician and bureaucrat. He held various offices in Spain, San Salvador, New Spain, and Mexico. His most notable political office was being the Colonial Intendant of the Intendancy of San Salvador from 1805 until he was deposed in the 1811 Independence Movement. Unlike other Spanish colonial administrators, Gutiérrez y Ulloa held no military background.

== Early life ==
Antonio Gutiérrez y Ulloa was born in Toro, Spain, on 14 June 1771. His parents were Nicolás Gutiérrez y Vitoria and Francisca de Ulloa y Sánchez Morales. He had a brother named Juan Gutiérrez y Ulloa. In 1797, he was appointed to the position of Tribune of the Major Accounting Office of Madrid.

== Colonial Intendant of San Salvador ==
On 28 June 1805, Gutiérrez y Ulloa was appointed as the Colonial Intendant of San Salvador, being the first to hold the office in an official capacity since Ignacio Santiago Ulloa in 1798. He was described as "infatuated" and "difficult" and was unpopular with those residing in San Salvador. In 1807, Gutiérrez y Ulloa held a census for the intendancy.

On 5 November 1811, José Matías Delgado, Manuel José Arce, and 400 armed supporters overthrew Gutiérrez y Ulloa by forcing his resignation, declaring "There is no King, no Intendant, or Captain General, we only have to obey our mayors." The independence movement was eventually crushed by Spanish forces under José Alejandro de Aycinena later in the year who became Colonial Intendant on 3 December 1811. His resignation was not officially accepted by the Real Audiencia of Guatemala until 26 September 1812.

== Later life ==
On 10 August 1814, Gutiérrez y Ulloa was appointed as Mayor of Guadalajara. On 18 July 1817, he was appointed as a finance minister of Mexico City by royal decree, but later he returned to Guadalajara on 7 November 1820. Gutiérrez y Ulloa supported the ascension of Agustín de Iturbide as Emperor of the First Mexican Empire in 1822.

== Death ==
Gutiérrez y Ulloa died in 1831.

== Orders and decorations ==
Spain

- Knight of the Order of Charles III (19 September 1804)

== Publications ==
- Estado General de la Provincia de San Salvador: Reyno de Guatemala. (Año de 1807)

Political offices
Preceded by Antonio Isidro Palomo (provisional)	Colonial Intendant of San Salvador; 1805–1811	Succeeded by José Batres y Asturias (provisional)
