= José Matías Delgado =

Salvadoran independence leader (1767–1832)

Presbyter José Matías Delgado
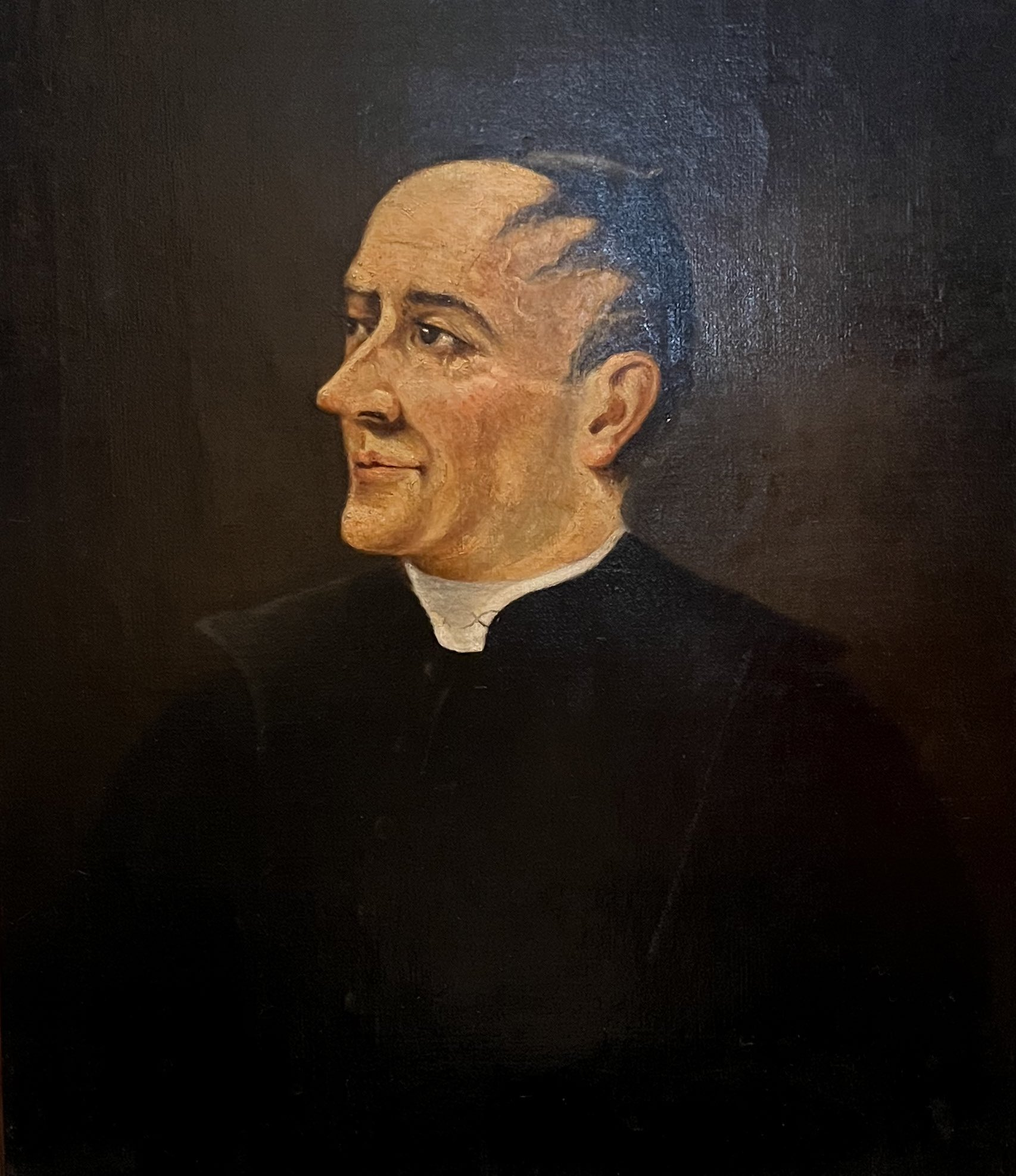
- Painting of José Matías Delgado (1910)

2nd Political Chief of San Salvador
- In office 28 November 1821 – 9 February 1823
- Monarch: Agustín I
- Preceded by: Pedro Barriere
- Succeeded by: Vicente Filísola

2nd President of the National Constituent Assembly of the United Provinces of Central America
- In office 24 June 1823 – 10 July 1823
- Preceded by: Vicente Filísola (as Superior Political Chief)
- Succeeded by: First Triumvirate

1st President of the Junta of Government of San Salvador
- In office 10 November 1822 – 5 December 1822
- Preceded by: Office established
- Succeeded by: José Mariano Calderón

40th President of the National Assembly of El Salvador
- In office 13 May 1832 – 9 June 1832
- Preceded by: Francisco González
- Succeeded by: Domingo Fagoaga

Deputy of the National Assembly of El Salvador
- In office 13 May 1832 – 8 September 1832

Personal details
- Born: José Matías Delgado y de León; 24 February 1767 San Salvador, New Spain, Spanish Empire
- Died: 12 November 1832 (aged 65) San Salvador, Federal Republic of Central America
- Resting place: El Rosario Church, San Salvador, El Salvador; 13°41′51″N 89°11′19″W
- Party: Independent
- Education: Tridentine College; University of San Carlos
- Occupation: Politician, priest
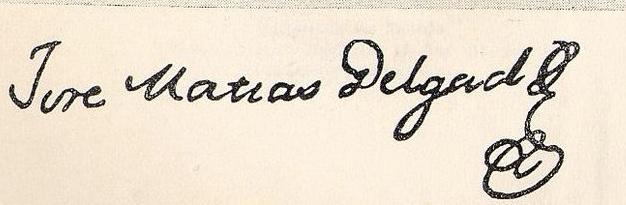
- Signature

Ordination history
History
Priestly ordination
- Date: 27 December 1794
- Place: University of San Carlos, Guatemala City, New Spain, Spanish Empire

José Matías Delgado y de León (24 February 1767 – 12 November 1832) was a Salvadoran politician, priest, and independence leader who was the second political chief of El Salvador. He also served as the president of the National Constituent Assembly of the United Provinces of Central America in 1823 and the president of the National Assembly of El Salvador in 1832.

He was a prominent leader in the independence movement of El Salvador from the Spanish Empire. He opposed El Salvador's proposed merger with Guatemala or Mexico. From 28 November 1821 to 9 February 1823, he was the Political Chief of San Salvador. He later served as the President of the Constituent Assembly of the United Provinces of Central America from 24 June 1823 to 1 July 1823.

== Early life ==
José Matías Delgado y de León was born on 24 February 1767 in San Salvador, then a part of the Spanish Empire's Greater Mayorship of San Salvador. His parents were Pedro Delgado y Matamoros (a Panamanian) and Marina Ana de León Mexía (a Guatemalan). Delgado was the couple's third son, and in total, he had six siblings. Through Delgado's mother, he was a direct descendent of Spanish conquistador Sancho de Barahona, a companion of Pedro de Alvarado who led the Spanish conquest of El Salvador in the 16th century. Delgado was baptized on 4 March.

In Delgado's youth, he studied humanities at the San Antonio Franciscan convent. He entered the Tridentine College and Seminary of Our Lady of the Assumption in Guatemala City on 16 December 1782 where he studied jurisprudence and canon law on a scholarship from Cayetano Francos y Monroy, the archbishop of Guatemala. Delgado eventually transferred to the University of San Carlos where he was ordained as a priest in the Catholic Church on 27 December 1794. He completed his Doctorate of Canon Law, Sacred Theology, and Civil Jurisprudence in 1796.

On 12 August 1797, Delgado was appointed as a curate in San Salvador's parish. There, he worked as an ecclesiastical judge and served as a member of San Salvador's Tribunal of the Holy Office. In 1801, he was the synodal examiner for the Diocese of Nicaragua. In 1802, Delgado suggested reconstructing the Parochial Church of San Salvador, and this reconstruction project began in 1808. It was completed the following decade and is now known as the El Rosario Church.

== Independence movement ==
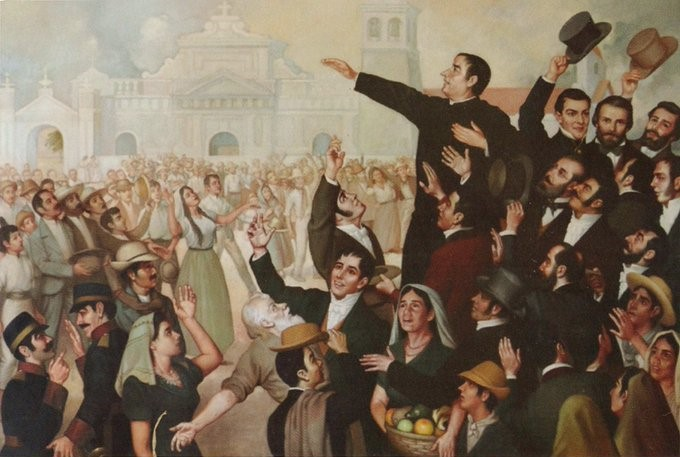
A painting of the First Independence Movement celebration in San Salvador. At the centre, José Matías Delgado.

In 1808, Napoleon Bonaparte invaded Spain and deposed King Ferdinand VII, replacing him with Joseph I, Napoleon's brother, beginning the Peninsular War. The Spanish colonies in the Americas did not recognize Joseph I as their King, and pro-independence sentiments began to arise.

Since 28 June 1805, the Colonial Intendant of San Salvador was Antonio Gutiérrez y Ulloa. He was described as "infatuated" and "difficult" and was unpopular with those residing in San Salvador.

In San Salvador, he became a leader of the independence movement. Together with his nephew Manuel José Arce, he was among those who issued the first Cry for Independence in Central America on 5 November 1811 in San Salvador. On this date, he is said to have rung the bells of the Church of La Merced as a public cry for liberty. The rebellion began with confiscating 3,000 guns and the funds in the royal treasury. The provincial intendant, Gutiérrez de Ulloa, was removed, as were most governmental employees.

The rebels held the government for nearly a month before royal authority was restored from Guatemala. Delgado's brothers Juan and Miguel were also members of the independence movement.

In 1813, Delgado was elected a provincial deputy to the council in Guatemala City and became director of the Tridentino Seminary there. He was not in El Salvador at the time of the second insurrection in 1814 and did not take part in it.

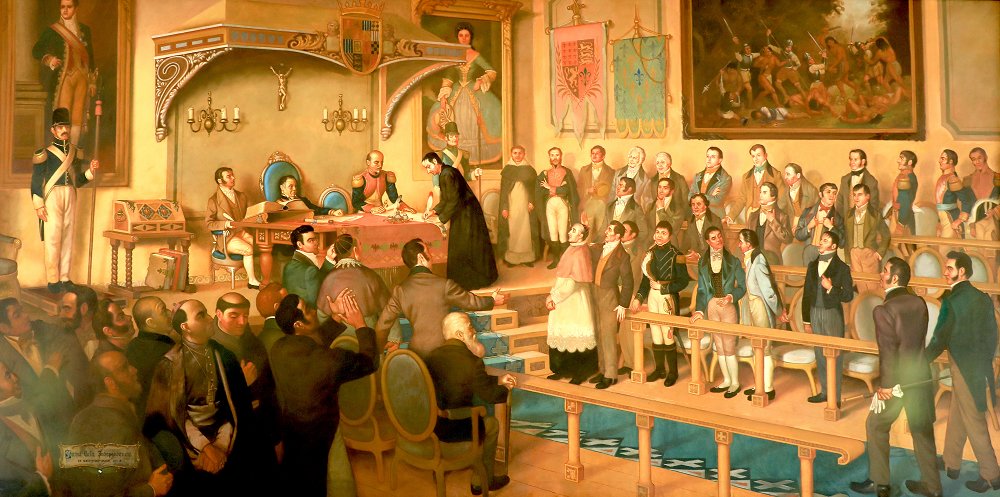
A painting by Chilean painter Luis Vergara Ahumada, depicting the signing of the Act by Father José Matías Delgado

He was elected provincial deputy again in 1820, and on 15 September 1821, he was among those who signed the Act of Independence of Central America in Guatemala City. On 28 November 1821, he became political chief of the province of San Salvador.

== As head of state of El Salvador ==
When the Central American governmental junta voted to join the Mexican Empire (5 January 1822), Delgado (and many other Salvadorans) opposed this. On 11 January 1822, in San Salvador, the city government, presided over by Padre Delgado, and many members of the public protested the decision. Also, on 11 January, the government of El Salvador seceded from Guatemala to remain outside the Mexican Empire.

In April 1822, Colonel Manuel Arzú, in command of Guatemalan troops, occupied the Salvadoran cities of Santa Ana and Sonsonate. On 3 June 1822, Arzú entered San Salvador, reaching the Plaza Major. Nine hours of fighting resulted in many casualties, burned houses, and plundering, but the Guatemalans then withdrew. Delgado's nephew, Colonel Manuel José Arce, was one of the commanders of the Salvadoran defenders. On 6 June 1822, Salvadoran troops reoccupied Santa Ana, and later Ahuachapán and Sonsonate.

On 2 December 1822, fearing further encroachment from Guatemala, El Salvador officially asked for annexation to the United States. A delegation was sent to the United States to negotiate.

That same month, Brigadier Vicente Filísola, Captain General of Guatemala (within the Mexican Empire), marched toward San Salvador. He entered the city on 9 February 1823, declaring respect for people and goods but also the annexation of the province to Mexico. This was the end of José Matías Delgado's government.

== Later life ==
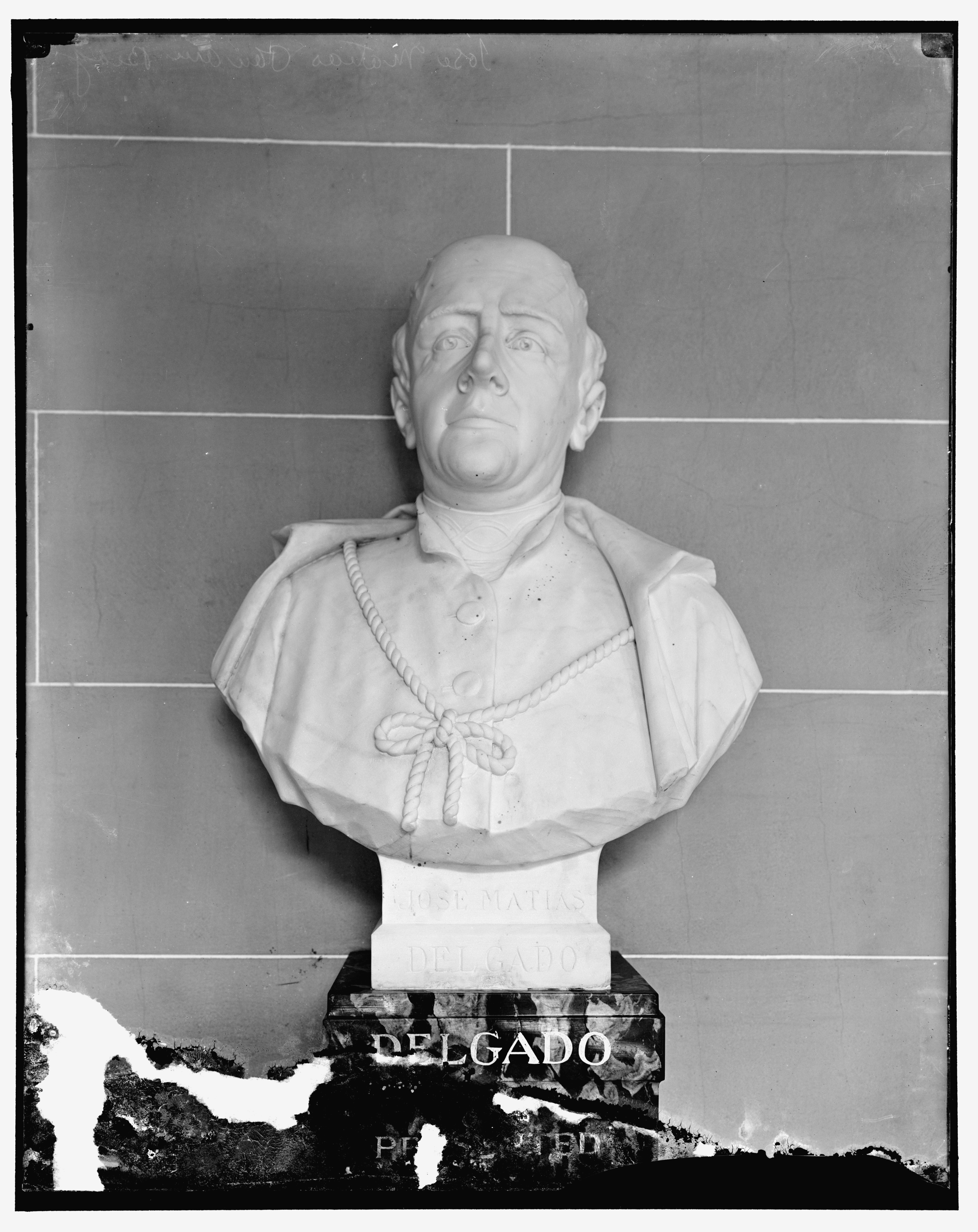
Bust of Delgado

Central America declared its independence on the fall of Mexican Emperor Agustín de Iturbide in 1823. Delgado was elected one of the representatives to the constituent congress of the Federal Republic of Central America. This congress met in Guatemala beginning on 24 June 1823, and Delgado was chosen to preside.

On 5 May 1824, he was named the first bishop of San Salvador by the local civil authorities and not by the Catholic Church. This entangled him in a serious and long-lasting controversy with the Archbishop of Guatemala and with Popes Leo XII and Pius VIII, which lasted until his death.

In 1824, he bought, in Guatemala, with public money, the first official printing press in El Salvador. It was used to publish the first Salvadoran newspaper, El Semanario Político Mercantil. The first issue appeared on 31 July 1824.

In 1832, Delgado was elected as a member of the National Assembly of El Salvador after the prior National Assembly was deposed by Central American president Francisco Morazán. Delgado served from 13 May to 8 September. He also served as its president from 13 May to 9 June and was succeeded by Colonel Domingo Fagoaga.

Delgado died due to poor health on 12 November 1832 at 8:30 p.m. in San Salvador, El Salvador, then still a part of the Federal Republic of Central America. His funeral was held in Greater Plaza (now Liberty Plaza) and he was buried in the El Rosario Church.

== Legacy ==
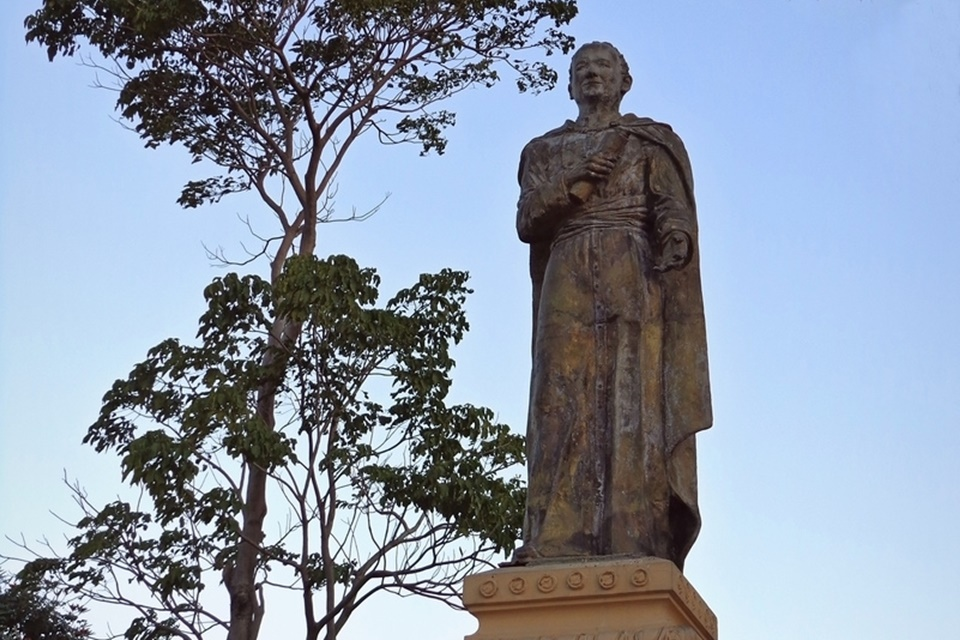
Statue of José Matías Delgado in San Salvador

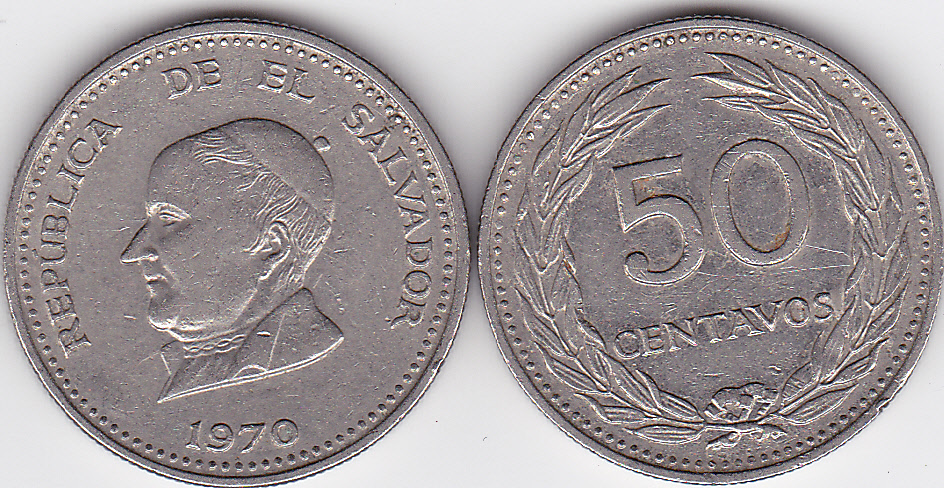
Delgado on the 50 cent colón

On 22 January 1833, National Assembly of El Salvador posthumously bestowed Delgado the title of "Meritorious of the Fatherland" ("Benemérito de la Patria") and ordered a painting of him to be created and displayed in the legislative chamber. On 24 January 1967, the renamed Legislative Assembly of El Salvador further bestowed him the title "Father of the Central American Fatherland" ("Padre de la Patria Centroamericana").

Delgado has been portrayed in various statues and monuments in El Salvador including a bust installed on Independence Avenue in San Salvador in 1902 and a statue dedicated on 14 September 1913 in Arce Park (although it was destroyed by the 1986 San Salvador earthquake). On 23 October 1935, the Indigenous pueblos of Aculhuaca, Paleca, and San Sebastián Texincal were merged to form the town of Delgado. It was later upgraded to a city on 17 September 1968. The José Matías Delgado University was established on 15 September 1977.

== See also ==
- Ciudad Delgado
- José Matías Delgado University
- National Order of José Matías Delgado

Political offices
Preceded by Pedro Barriere	Political Chief of San Salvador; 1821–1823	Succeeded by Vicente Filísola
New office	President of the Junta of Government of San Salvador; 1822	Succeeded by José Mariano Calderón
Preceded by Vicente Filísola	President of the Constituent Assembly of the United Provinces of Central America; 1823	Succeeded by First Triumvirate
Preceded by Francisco González	President of the National Assembly of El Salvador; 1832	Succeeded by Domingo Fagoaga
