= Colonial Intendant of San Salvador =

Spanish colonial position

- Intendente colonial de San Salvador
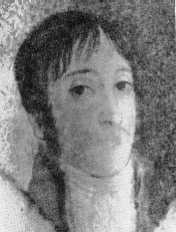
- Pedro Barriere, the office's final holder.
- Status: Abolished
- Reports to: King of Spain
- Formation: 1786
- First holder: José Ortiz de la Peña
- Final holder: Pedro Barriere
- Abolished: 21 September 1821

The Colonial Intendant of San Salvador (Spanish: Intendente colonial de San Salvador) was a political position created in 1786 to govern the Intendancy of San Salvador, modern-day El Salvador, that was a part of the Captaincy General of Guatemala, which itself was a part of the Viceroyalty of New Spain, a Spanish colony. The position was abolished on 21 September 1821 with the independence of Central America.

== List of Colonial Intendants ==
No.	Portrait	Name (Birth–Death)	Term of office		Political Affiliation	Refs
No.	Portrait	Name (Birth–Death)	Took office	Left office	Political Affiliation	Refs
1		José Ortiz de la Peña (?–?)	1786	1789	Independent	
2		Francisco Luis Héctor de Carondelet (1748–1807)	1789	1791	Independent	
3		José Antonio María de Aguilar (1758–1799)	1791	1793	Independent	
4		Ignacio Santiago Ulloa (?–1789)	1793	1 January 1798	Independent	
–		José Antonio María de Aguilar (1758–1799)	1 January 1798	15 September 1799	Independent	
–		Bernardo José de Arce (?–?)	15 September 1799	1800	Independent	
–		Luis Martínez Navarrete (?–?)	1800	1801	Independent	
–		Luis de Argueda (?–?)	1801	1802	Independent	
–		José Justiniano Rosi (?–?)	1802	1803	Independent	
–		Buenaventura de Viteri (?–?)	1803	1804	Independent	
–		Francisco Vallejo (?–?)	1804	1804	Independent	
–		Antonio Isidro Palomo (?–?)	1804	28 June 1805	Independent	
5		Antonio Gutiérrez y Ulloa (1771–1831)	28 June 1805	5 November 1811	Independent	
–		José Mariano Batres y Asturias (?–?)	5 November 1811	3 December 1811	Independent	
–		José Alejandro de Aycinena (1767–1826)	3 December 1811	August 1812	Independent	
6		José María Peinado y Pezonarte (1769–1820)	August 1812	1814	Independent	
–		José Méndez de Quiroga (?–1817)	1814	1817	Independent	
–		Juan Miguel de Bustamante (?–?)	1817	1818	Independent	
–		Simón Gutiérrez (1780–?)	1818	1818	Independent	
7		José María Peinado y Pezonarte (1769–1819)	1818	1819	Independent	
–		Pedro Barriere (1768–1827)	1819	21 September 1821	Independent	

== See also ==
- President of El Salvador
- President of the Federal Republic of Central America

== Bibliography ==
- Cruz Pacheco, José Santa; Cadenas y Vicent, Vicente (1981). "Relacion de los Alcaldes Mayores de San Salvador" [Relation of the Greater Mayors of San Salvador]. Hidalguía – La Revista de Genealogia, Nobelza y Armas [Hidalguía - The Magazine of Genealogy, Nobility and Arms] (in Spanish). Vol. 166–167. Madrid, Spain: Publicación Bimenstral. pp. 469–480. ISSN 0018-1285.
- Meléndez Chaverri, Carlos (1961). José Matías Delgado, Prócer Centroamericano [José Matías Delgado, Central American Procreator] (in Spanish). Vol. 8 (2 ed.). San Salvador: Directorate of Publications and Prints, National Council for Culture and Art (published 2000). pp. 9–343. ISBN 9992300574.
