= Girona Provincial Council =

Local government body

The Diputació de Girona (in Spanish: Diputación de Girona) is a public institution that provides direct services to citizens and technical, economic and technological support to the municipalities of the province of Girona (221 municipalities) in the autonomous community of Catalonia, Spain. It also coordinates certain municipal services and organizes services of a supra-municipal nature. Its headquarters are located in the city of Girona.

== History ==
The Diputación Provincial de Gerona began operating on 5 May 1822 in a building on Plaça del Vi (Plaça del Vi in Catalan), on the corner with Cuesta del Puente de Piedra. It functioned for sixteen months, until 1823, and did not resume its activity until the return of the Liberal Regime in 1836.

In 1924, during the dictatorship of Primo de Rivera, the Mancomunitat was dissolved and the deputies came to be appointed directly by the central authorities. The regime’s hostility to Catalanism during this period led the Diputación to focus on other areas, such as drafting the statutes of the Provincial Savings Bank, purchasing the Arab Baths, or developing policy on railways.

With the fall of the Primo de Rivera dictatorship and the establishment of the Second Spanish Republic, a series of changes took place, alongside the restoration of Catalan autonomy and the reinstatement of the Generalitat: from 14 April 1931 all documents began to be written in Catalan instead of Spanish, and handwritten records were replaced by typewritten ones. The Diputación itself was dissolved and became a delegated commissioner of the Generalitat. One of the priorities of this period was the teaching of the Catalan language. In addition, there was significant activity in the field of cultural heritage (works at Sant Pere de Rodes, Santa Maria de Vilabertran and the citadel of Roses, for example).

During Franco’s dictatorship, the Diputación granted Francisco Franco several honours: he was named Hijo Adoptivo of the province of Gerona and awarded the Gran Cruz Laureada de San Fernando shortly after the end of the Spanish Civil War, appointed Honorary President of the Diputación on 18 February 1944, and given the province’s gold medal in 1959. This last distinction was withdrawn on 26 July 2005.

From the death of the dictator Franco in 1975 until the first democratic municipal elections in 1979, the members of the Diputación still were not chosen at the ballot box. In this period, notable developments included the start of the Girona Art Museum project and the creation of the Girona Tourist Board. The first democratic president was Joan Vidal Gayolà. From 1980 onwards, the minutes were once again drafted in Catalan, new aid schemes were created for the municipalities, and policies were implemented to improve telephone and television coverage, public services and heritage-related projects.

== Composition ==
The governing bodies of the Provincial Council are: the president, the vice-presidents, the corporation, the plenary and the standing committees.

Following the 2023 Spanish local elections, the composition of the Diputación was as follows:

Current composition of the Diputación after the 2023 Spanish local elections
Political party	Votes	%	Deputies
Junts per Catalunya–Compromís Municipal (JUNTS–CM)	80,613	28.34%	10
Esquerra Republicana de Catalunya–Acuerdo Municipal (ERC–AM)	64,771	22.77%	8
Partido de los Socialistas de Cataluña–Candidatura de progreso (PSC–CP)	40,050	14.07%	5
Popular Unity Candidacy (CUP)	23,251	8.17%	2
Tots per l'Empordà (Txl’E)	12,787	4.49%	1
Independientes de la Selva (IdSELVA)	8,071	2.83%	1

=== Distribution of seats by judicial districts ===
Judicial district					Txl’E	IdSELVA	Deputies
Figueres	2	1	1				4
Girona	3	2	2	2			9
La Bisbal d'Empordà	1	2	1		1		5
Olot	1	1					2
Puigcerdà	1						1
Santa Coloma de Farners	2	2	1			1	6
Total	10	8	5	2	1	1	27
