= José Mariano Calderón =

Central American Independence Leader

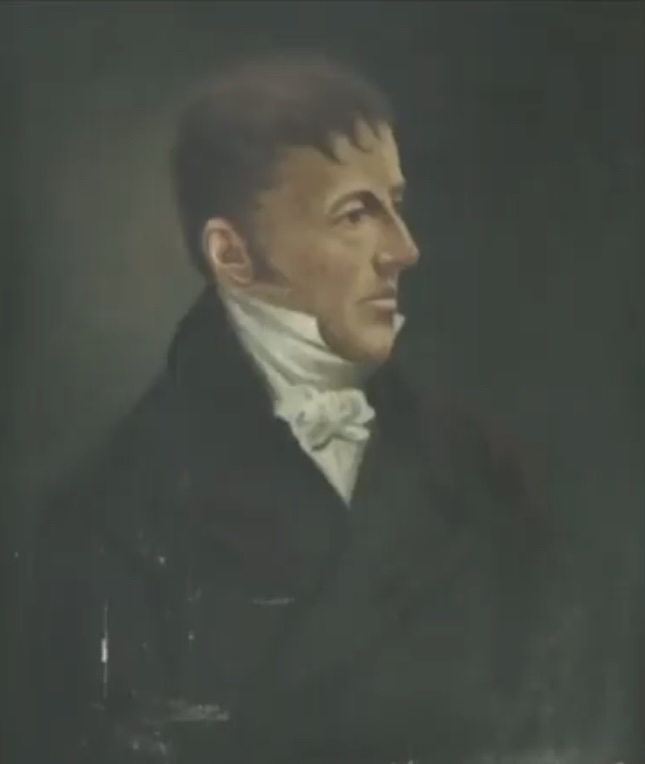
José Mariano Calderón

José Mariano Calderón y San Martín was one of the signers of the Act of Independence of Central America, and was the president of the constituent assembly that drafted the Constitution of El Salvador.

== Biography ==
José Mariano Calderón was born in 1774 in the department of San Vicente of the city of San Vicente, which was part of the Municipality of San Salvador.

The son of Mariano Antonio Calderón de la Barca and Teodora de San Martín, he completed his primary and secondary education in what is now El Salvador and Guatemala, and upon graduation entered the Tridentine Seminary, being ordained as a priest on October 9, 1803.

He was curate to the parish priest of Metapán, and later became a beneficiary priest in Zacatecoluca from June 1810. He preached to his parishioners the ideas of freedom and independence since the Independence Movement of 1811.

Later he was appointed priest of Santiago Texacuangos on July 13, 1820 (where he worked until the day of his death, except for some interruptions). In 1821 he was elected in Chiquimula as part of the Guatemalan Provincial Council, and signed the Central American Independence Act. He later became a member of the Consultation Board that governed Central America from independence, being one of the signatories of the annexation to the First Mexican Empire of Agustín de Iturbide.

He returned to the parish of Santiago Texacuangos, where he gave asylum to the refugees and persecuted by the Mexican general Vicente Filísola during the invasion of Mexico to the Province of San Salvador. Later he was representative for Chalatenango before the National Assembly of Guatemala, where he signed the Act of Independence of Central America from Mexico.

From March 14, 1824 to April 17, 1824, he was provisional president of the constituent assembly of the State of El Salvador, which drafted the first constitution of El Salvador. Some time later he returned to take charge of the parish of Santiago Texacuangos, where he died on April 9, 1826.
