= Breda, Spain =

Breda
- Municipality
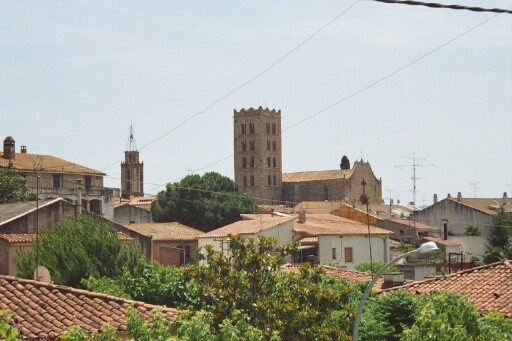
- Breda, with the belltower of Sant Salvador

- Flag

- Location in Catalonia Breda (Spain)
- Coordinates: 41.75°N 2.56°E
- Country: Spain
- Community: Catalonia
- Province: Girona
- Comarca: Selva

Government
  - Mayor: Dídac Manresa Molins (2015)

Area
  - Total: 5.0 km^{2} (1.9 sq mi)

Population (2025-01-01)
  - Total: 3,969
  - Density: 790/km^{2} (2,100/sq mi)
- Website: breda.cat

Breda (Catalan pronunciation: [ˈbɾɛðə]) is a village in the province of Girona and autonomous community of Catalonia, Spain. The municipality covers an area of 5.09 square kilometres (1.97 sq mi) and the population in 2014 was 3,751.
