= Mariano Beltranena y Llano =

Guatemalan politician

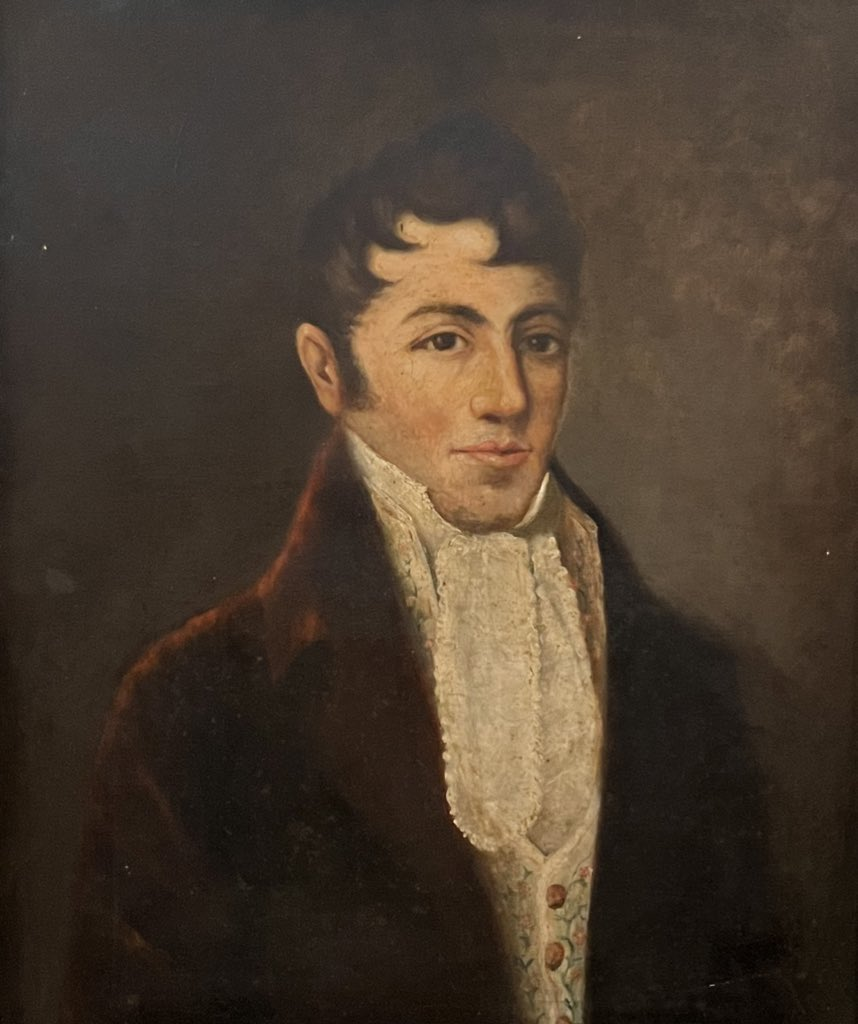
Mariano Beltranena y Llano

Mariano Eligio Ramón de Beltranena y Llano (17 November 1781 – 27 May 1866) was a Liberal Guatemalan politician who served as interim president of the Federal Republic of Central America from 13 April 1829 to 14 June 1829. He also served as vice president prior to being interim president after José Cecilio del Valle resigned as Manuel José Arce's vice president.

He was born in Villa Nueva, Guatemala, one of at least 14 children of Pedro José de Beltranena (son of Martín de Beltranena and Ana María de Ayzinena) and María Josefa del Llano (daughter of Manuel del Llano and Francisca Xaviera de Naxera). His family came from Navarre, Spain.

He died in Matanzas, Cuba on 27 May 1866.

== See also ==
- List of presidents of Guatemala
- José Francisco Barrundia
