= Act of Independence of Central America =

1821 declaration of Guatemalan independence from the Spanish Empire

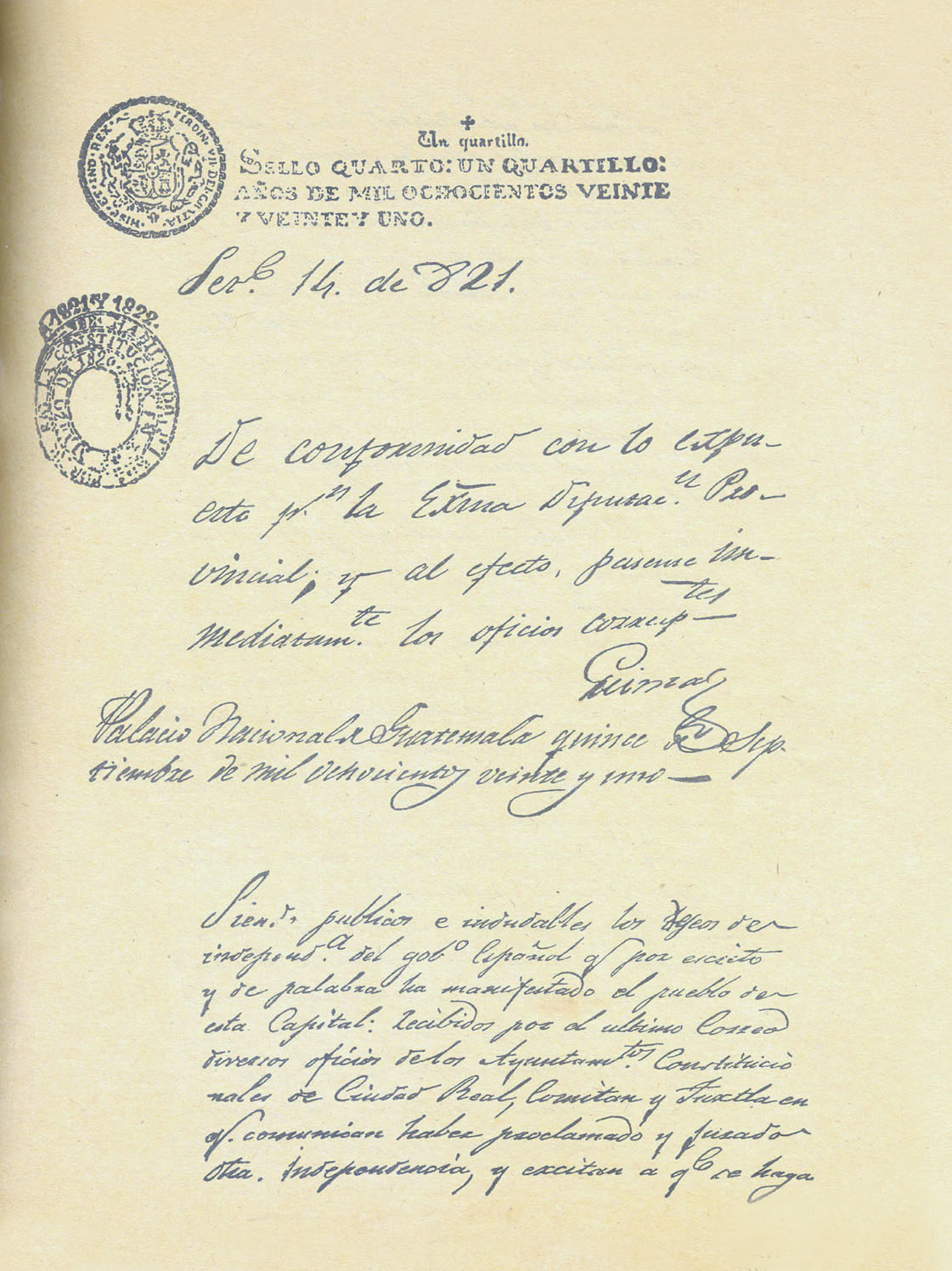
- A scan of the act of independence

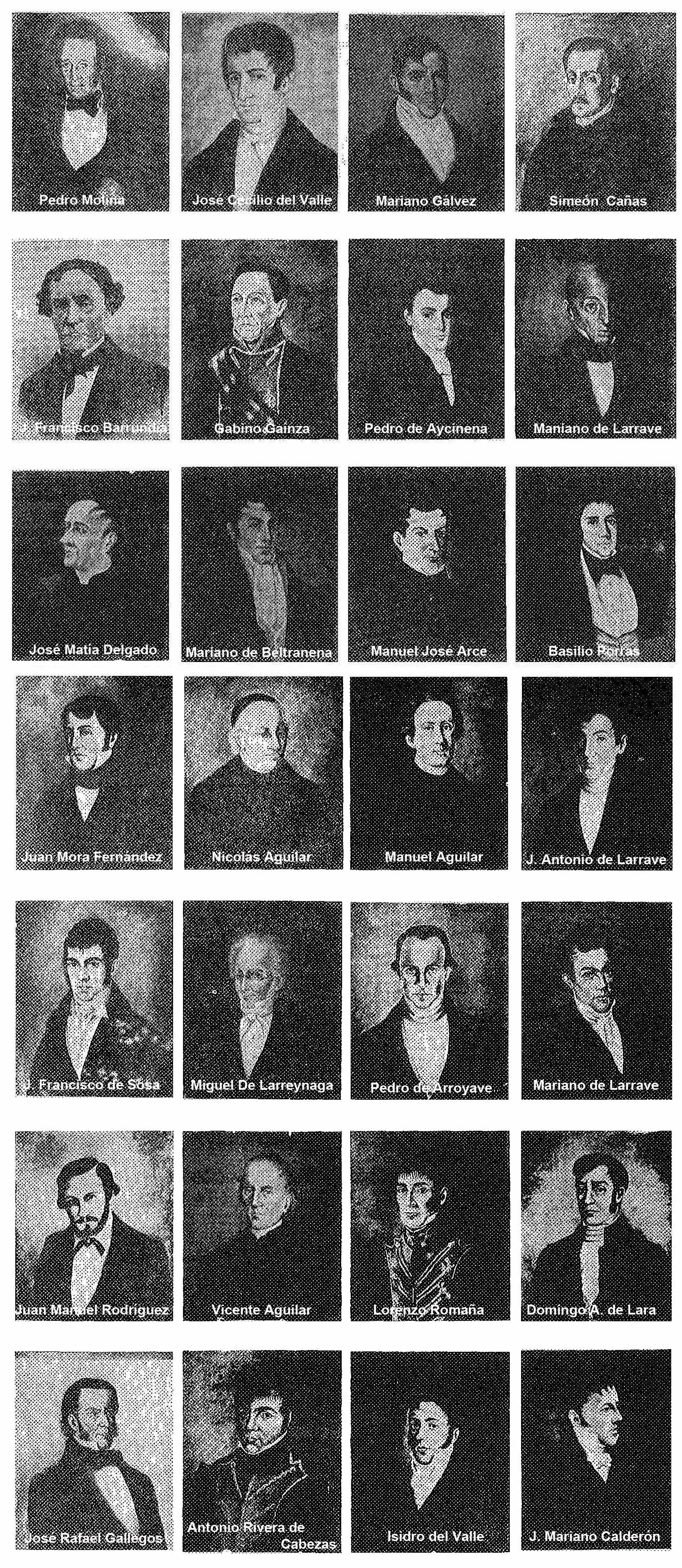
- Signers of the Act of Independence
- Ratified: 15 September 1821
- Location: Legislative Assembly of El Salvador
- Author: José Cecilio del Valle
- Signatories: 13 representatives of the provinces of the Captaincy General of Guatemala
- Purpose: To announce separation from the Spanish Empire and provide for the establishment of a new Central American state

The Act of Independence of Central America (Spanish: Acta de Independencia Centroamericana), also known as the Act of Independence of Guatemala, is the legal document by which the Provincial Council of the Province of Guatemala proclaimed the independence of Central America from the Spanish Empire and invited the other provinces of the Captaincy General of Guatemala (Note: As part of the adoption of the Spanish Constitution of 1812, the Cortes of Cádiz consolidated the seven historic provinces of the Captaincy General of Guatemala into only two: the Province of Guatemala (consisting of the former provinces of Guatemala, Belize, Chiapas, Honduras and El Salvador) and the Province of Nicaragua y Costa Rica. These newly combined provinces officially existed from 1812 to 1814 and from 1820 until their independence. In the Act of Independence of Central America and contemporary correspondence, Central American writers generally continued to refer to the seven historic divisions of the region as "provinces," despite the recent administrative reorganization.) to send envoys to a congress to decide the form of the region's independence. It was enacted on 15 September 1821.

== Independence movements ==
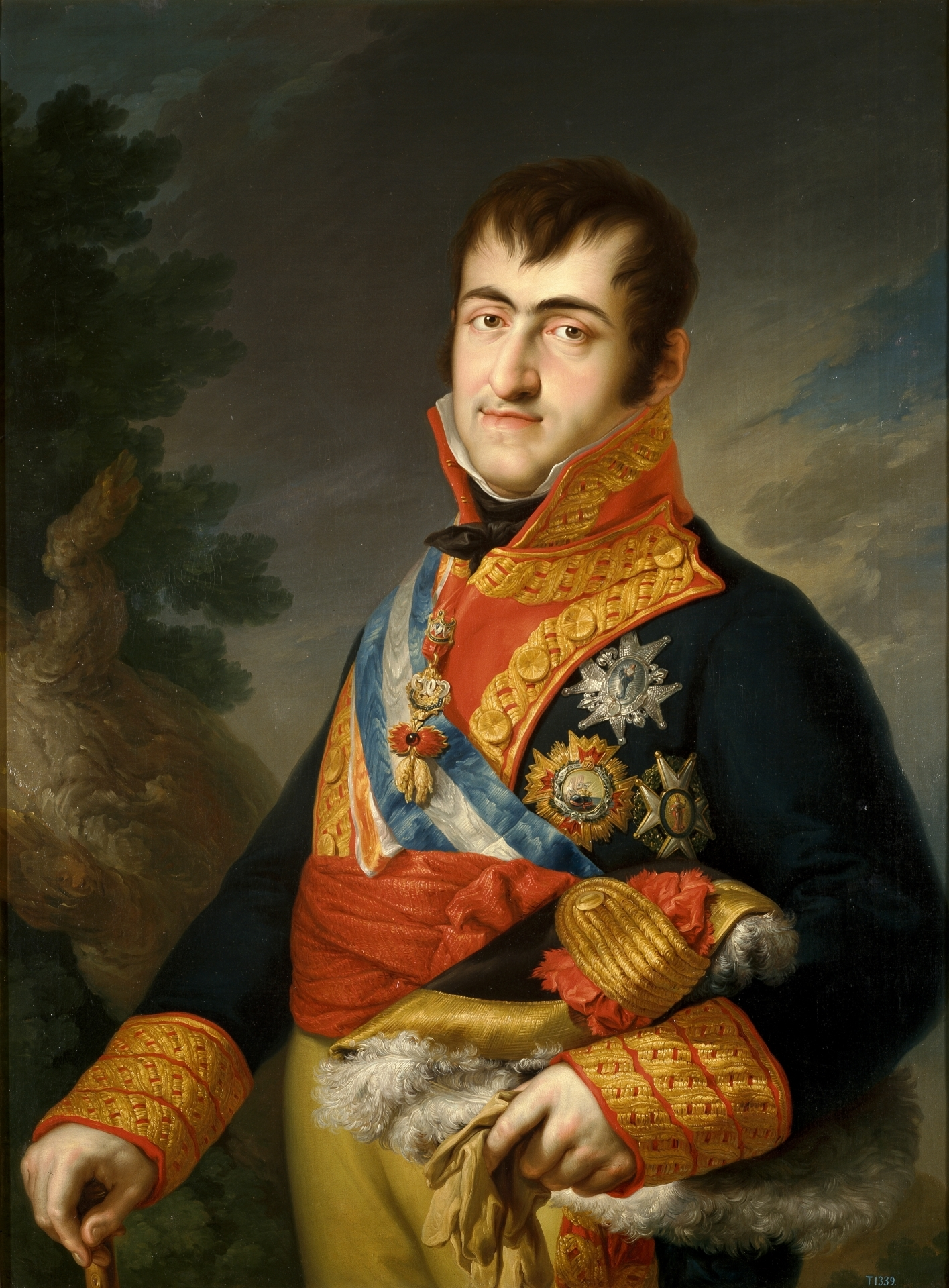
Ferdinand VII of Spain, who ruled during the separation of most of the Spanish American territories from the rest of the empire

By the turn of the nineteenth-century, it became clear that several unique regional identities had formed in Central America, although the authority for self-governance that each of these regions held was less discernible. Eventually though, the divisions would result in the dominance of Guatemala City and the wider area of Guatemala, which held the seat of the captaincy general, the only university in Central America, and most importantly, a large population of Peninsulares (people born in Spain). The other regions, Comayagua (modern Honduras), Nicaragua, San Salvador (modern El Salvador), and Costa Rica, were less prosperous than Guatemala, but each held varying degrees of loyalty to the Spanish crown. The combination of the American and French Revolutions, the control of Peninsular Spaniards over Central America, and Spain's role in the Peninsular War would set the stage for independence movements.

The events of the Peninsular War—in particular the removal of Ferdinand VII from the Spanish throne—inspired and facilitated a series of revolts in El Salvador and Nicaragua, aimed at winning greater political autonomy for Central America. Though quickly suppressed, these uprisings formed part of the general political upheaval in the Spanish world that led to the Spanish Constitution of 1812. Between 1810 and 1814 the Captaincy General of Guatemala elected seven representatives to the new Cortes of Cádiz and formed locally elected provincial governing councils.

However, shortly after his restoration to power in 1814, Ferdinand repudiated the 1812 constitution, dissolved the Cortes, and suppressed liberalism in peninsular Spain, which provoked renewed unrest in the Spanish Americas. The brief restoration of the constitution during the Liberal Triennium beginning in 1820 allowed the Central American provinces to reestablish their elected councils, which then became focal points for constitutionalist and separatist sentiments. In 1821 the provincial council of Guatemala began to openly discuss a declaration of independence from Spain.

== Promulgation of the Act ==
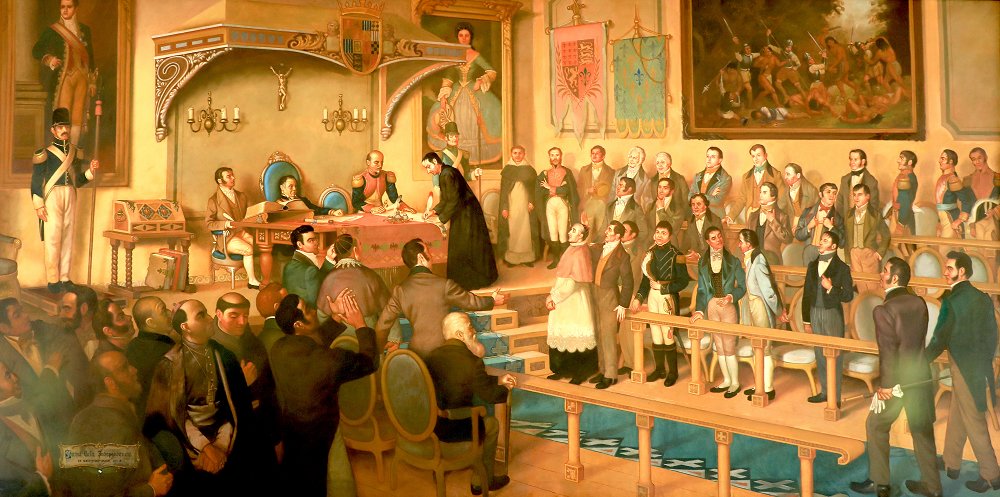
A painting by Chilean painter Luis Vergara Ahumada, depicting the signing of the Act by Father José Matías Delgado

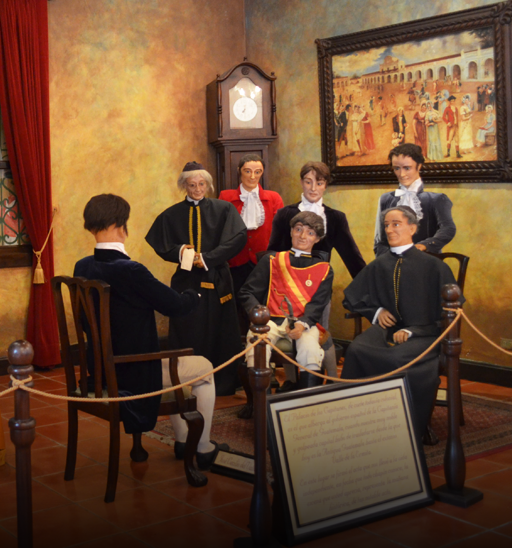
The representation of the signature of the act of independence on September 15, 1821 in Xetulul Park, in Guatemala. The Salvadoran priest Dr. José Matías Delgado y de León, last commissioner of the Holy Office in the Mayor's Office, highlights.

In September the discussion turned toward an outright declaration of independence from Spain, and a document announcing the act was drawn up and debated. The 15 September council meeting at which independence was finally declared was chaired by Gabino Gaínza, and the text of the Act itself was written by Honduran intellectual and politician José Cecilio del Valle and signed by representatives of the various Central American provinces, including José Matías Delgado, José Lorenzo de Romaña and José Domingo Diéguez. The meeting was held at the National Palace in Guatemala City, the site of which is now Centennial Park.

The Province of San Salvador accepted the decision of the Guatemalan Council on 21 September, and the Act was seconded by the provincial councils of Comayagua on 28 September and of Nicaragua and Costa Rica on 11 October. However, the other provinces were reluctant to accept the primacy of Guatemala in a new Central American state, and the form of the new polity that would succeed the Captaincy General was not at all clear.

The increasing lack of political cohesion in Central America took new forms after the independence acts were accepted. Divisions within the urban centers of San Salvador, Comayagua, and Nicaragua, split those regions in half. In Costa Rica, its isolation from the rest of Central America combined with its previous loyalty to Spain and the rivalry between San José and Cartago to alienate it from the government in Guatemala. As Central America faced disintegration, two solutions presented themselves. The success of neighboring Mexico in its own war of independence led some in Central America to see it as the region's best chance of continued unity, while others wished for absolute independence for their own gain, for idealistic reasons, or because they feared Mexico could not protect their economic interests.

== Aftermath and union with Mexico ==
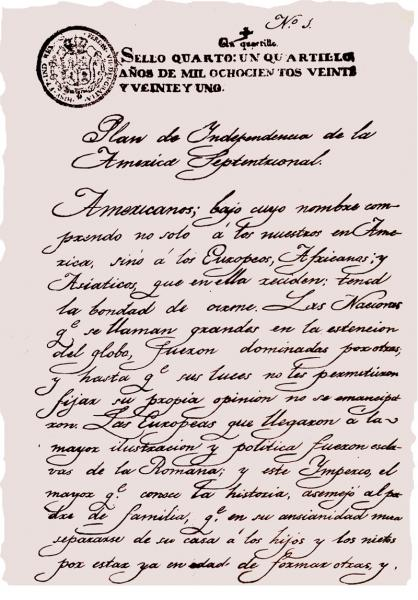
The Plan of Iguala

Article 2 of the Act of Independence provided for the formation of a congress to "decide the point of absolute general independence and fix, in case of agreement, the form of government and the fundamental law of governance" for the new state. This constituent assembly was meant to meet the following March, but the opportunity never came. Instead, on 29 October 1821 the president of the provisional governing council of newly independent Mexico, Agustín de Iturbide, sent a letter to Gabino Gaínza (now the president of the interim government of Central America) and the council of delegates representing the provinces of Chiapas, El Salvador, Honduras, Nicaragua and Costa Rica with a proposal that Central America join the Mexican Empire under the terms of the Three Guarantees of the Treaty of Córdoba.

These guarantees, otherwise known as the Plan of Iguala, promised the continuation of the Catholic faith in the region, final independence from Spain, and the creation of a constitutional monarchy. However, most importantly for Central America, the plan called for unity among the various regional entities of northern Spanish America under one kingdom. This division had already been proposed, first by Charles II of Spain and then in the Cortes of 1820. It was intended that the Spanish colonies would be split into two kingdoms, with one encompassing the territories north of modern-day Panama and the other encompassing New Granada and the lands south of it. While the proposed division did not occur as planned, the plan did establish a legal precedent for the idea of political unity between Mexico, Guatemala, and the "Provincias Internas" and helped set the stage for the unification with Mexico.

The various provincial and municipal governments of Guatemala were consulted and votes taken, with the five provinces excepting El Salvador voting in favor and with El Salvador opposing. On 5 January 1822, Gaínza sent a letter to Iturbide accepting Central America's annexation, and all the territories of Central America were incorporated into the Mexican Empire. They would remain united with Mexico for less than two years before seceding to form the Federal Republic of Central America as the Mexican Empire fell.

=== Signatures ===
- Gabino Gaínza Fernández de Medrano
- José Matías Delgado
- Manuel Antonio de Molina
- Mariano de Larrave
- Mariano de Aycinena y Piñol
- Mariano Beltranena y Llano
- José Antonio de Larrave
- Pedro de Arroyave
- José Mariano Calderón
- Antonio Rivera Cabezas
- Ysidoro de Valle y Castriciones
- José Domingo Diéguez (Secretary)
- Lorenzo de Romaña (Secretary)

== See also ==
- Declaration of Independence of the Mexican Empire
