= Provincial deputation =

Provincial deputation can refer to:

- Provincial deputation (Spain)
- Provincial deputation in Spanish America
