= Manuel José Arce =

President of the Federal Republic of Central America

General Manuel José Arce
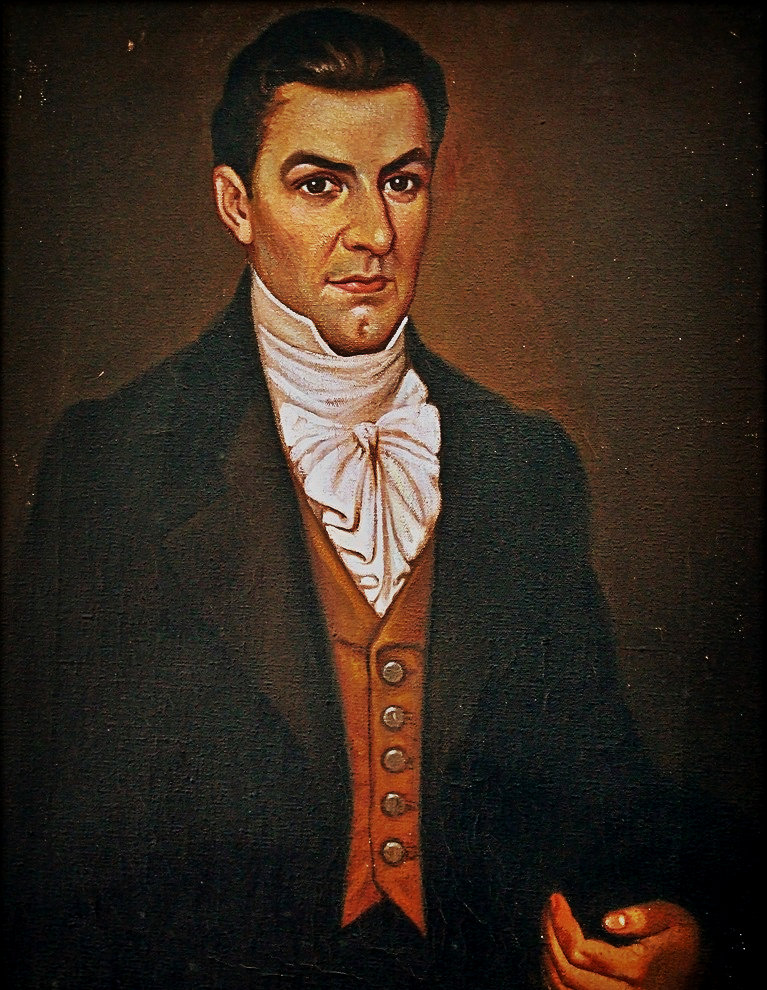

1st President of the Federal Republic of Central America
- In office 29 April 1825 – 14 February 1828
- Vice President: Mariano Beltranena y Llano
- Preceded by: Position established
- Succeeded by: Mariano Beltranena y Llano (interim)

Personal details
- Born: Manuel José Arce y Fagoaga; 1 January 1787 San Salvador, Intendancy of San Salvador, New Spain
- Died: 14 December 1847 (aged 60) San Salvador, El Salvador
- Resting place: Military Museum of the Armed Forces of El Salvador
- Party: Liberal
- Occupation: Politician, military officer

Military service
- Rank: General
- Battles/wars: Mexican invasion of El Salvador • Capitulation of Gualcince; First Central American Civil War; Domínguez's expedition to Honduras

Manuel José Arce y Fagoaga (1 January 1787 – 14 December 1847) was a Salvadoran statesman and military officer who served as the first president of the Federal Republic of Central America from 1825 to 1829.

== Background ==
Manuel José Arce was the son of Spaniard Bernardo José de Arce, the Colonial Intendant of the Intendancy of San Salvador from 1800 until 1801, and Antonia Fagoaga. He was born in the Intendancy of San Salvador, what is now El Salvador. In 1801 he was sent to Guatemala to continue his education. There he graduated in philosophy from the Colegio de San Francisco Borja. He began the study of medicine at the Universidad de San Carlos de Borromeo, but it was interrupted because of his father's sickness. In December 1808, he married Felipa de Aranzamendi y Aguiar in San Salvador.

== Independence movement ==
Arce joined the movement for independence from Spain, joining in the first Cry for Independence on 5 November 1811 in San Salvador. It was led by his uncle, José Matías Delgado, the vicar of San Salvador. The rebels held the government for nearly a month before royal authority was restored from Guatemala. Arce was also involved in the second uprising that began 22 January 1814. This cost him four years in prison.

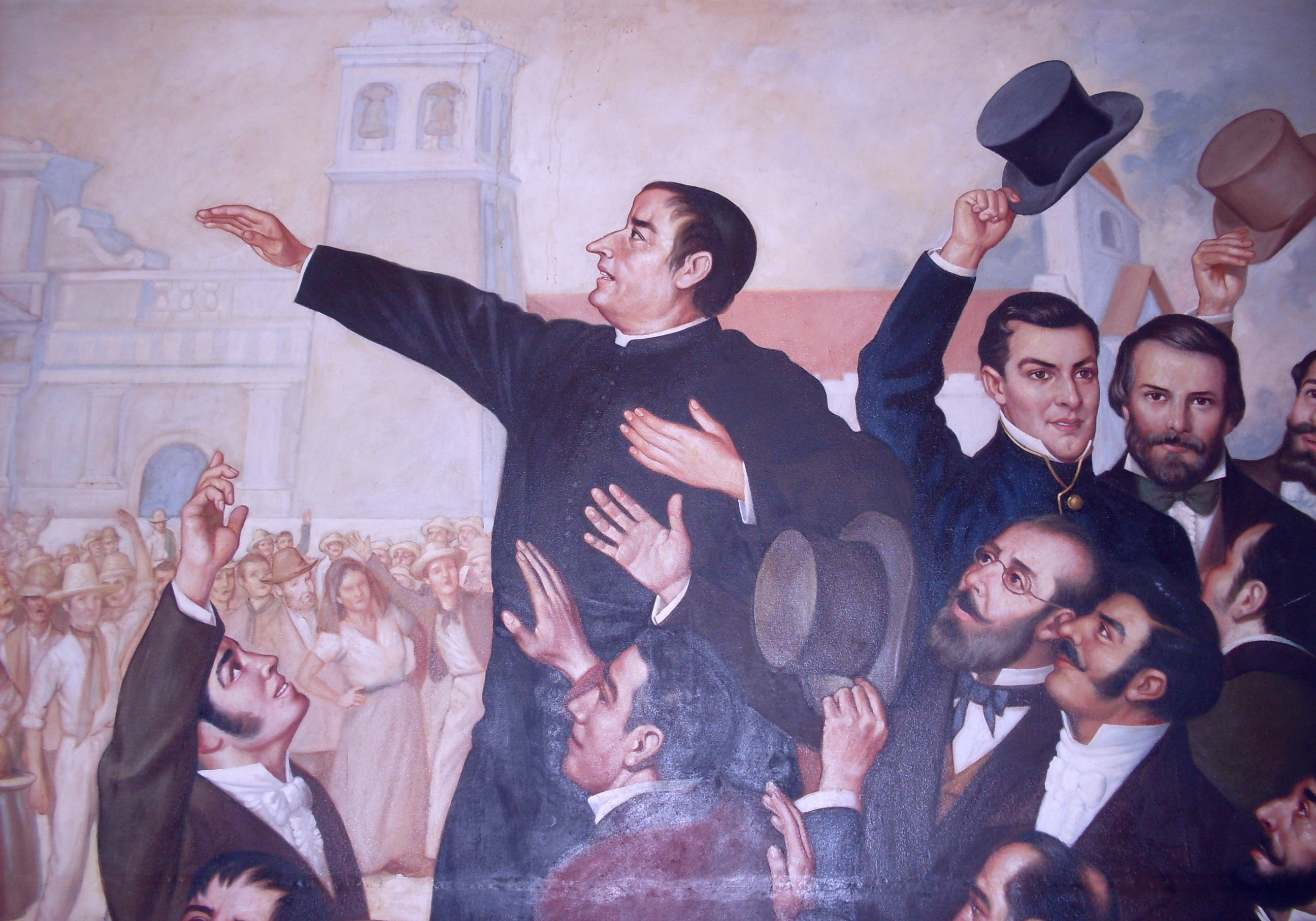
Some of the leaders of the Cry for Independence on 5 November 1811 in San Salvador. (such as José Matías Delgado, Manuel José Arce and Juan Manuel Rodríguez) appear in the picture of Luis Vergara Ahumada.

He strongly opposed the Mexican Empire of Agustín de Iturbide and its efforts to annex Central America. In April 1822 Manuel Arzú, in command of Guatemalan troops supporting Mexico, occupied the cities of Santa Ana, El Salvador, and Sonsonate. On 3 June 1822, Arzú entered San Salvador, reaching the Plaza Mayor. Nine hours of fighting resulted in many casualties and burned houses. Colonel Arce was one of the commanders of the Salvadoran defenders.

Arce was also a member of the resistance towards the movement that was requesting annexation to the United States. The government of El Salvador had requested annexation to the United States on 2 December 1822.

In October 1823 he left the United States to return to El Salvador. He stopped in Mexico. There he tried to raise a force to liberate Cuba from Spanish rule but it failed.

== As president ==
Also in October 1823 he was elected a member of the executive triumvirate of Central America. He accepted this post on 15 March 1824 on his return to the country, serving until 20 October 1824. During this time the government succeeded in pacifying Nicaragua, with a minimum of violence.

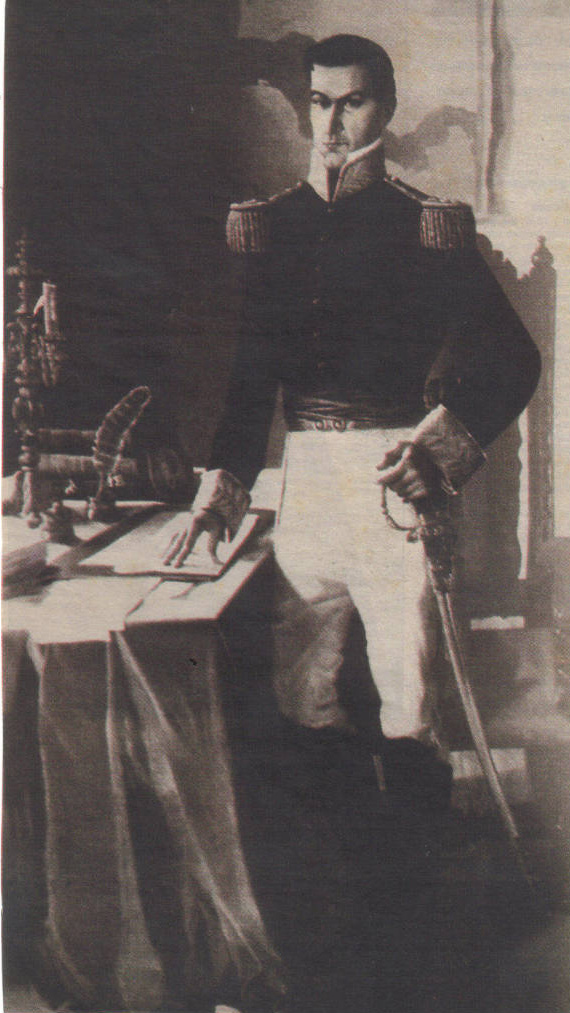
General Manuel José Arce; decorated Salvadoran General and president of the Federal Republic of Central America from 1825 to 1829.

Presidential elections were held in 1825, and José Cecilio del Valle won the most votes. The Liberals, however, controlled the federal Congress, and they decided that Valle had not won an absolute majority. They chose Arce as president. He served from 29 April 1825 to 13 April 1829.

He soon lost the support of the Liberals in Congress. After 1826 neither house of the federal Congress met. Arce obtained some support from the clergy and the Conservative Party, but there were difficulties with the State of Guatemala. He deposed the Guatemalan state governor, Juan Barrundia, a Liberal, and replaced him. The Salvadoran state government was angry and rebelled, and a civil war started that lasted from 1826 to 1829. On 1829 Arce called Vice President Mariano Beltranena y Llano to temporarily exercise the presidency, but when Arce wanted to resume it, Beltranena refused and remained in office until April 1829 when the liberals troops entered Guatemala City and overthrew his administration.

== Later life ==
In 1832 he was in Soconusco in (then of Guatemala, now part of Mexico), where he organized a military expedition against the federal government of Francisco Morazán. Arce was defeated on 24 February 1832.

He finally returned to El Salvador in 1842, but soon he fled to Honduras and Guatemala. In April and May 1844 he directed some armed attempts to overthrow Francisco Malespín in El Salvador. He returned again to the country in the middle of 1845. He left politics for a more private life in 1846, working on his book Brief Indications for the Reorganization of Central America.

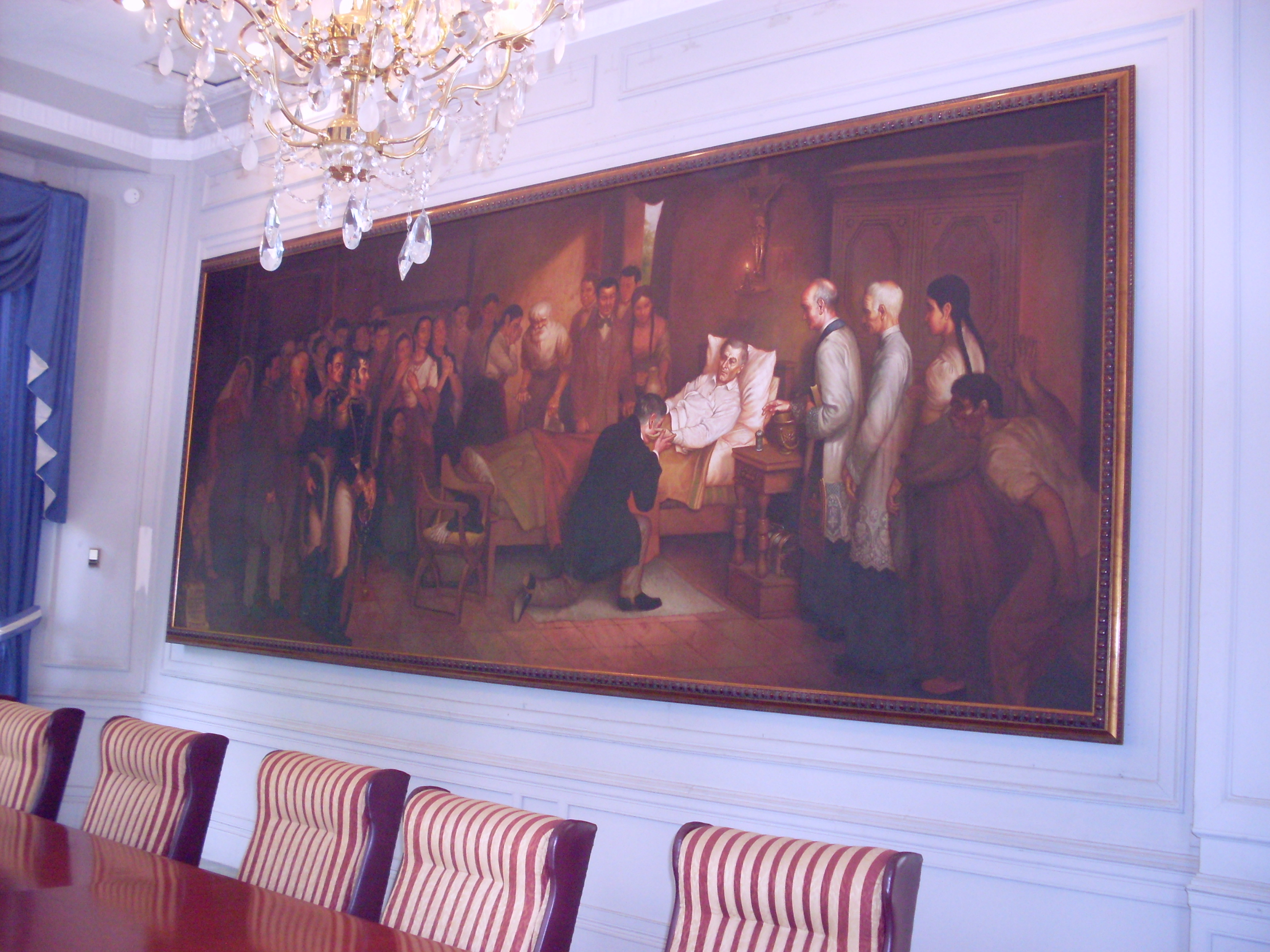
Manuel José Arce death, in the national palace in San Salvador

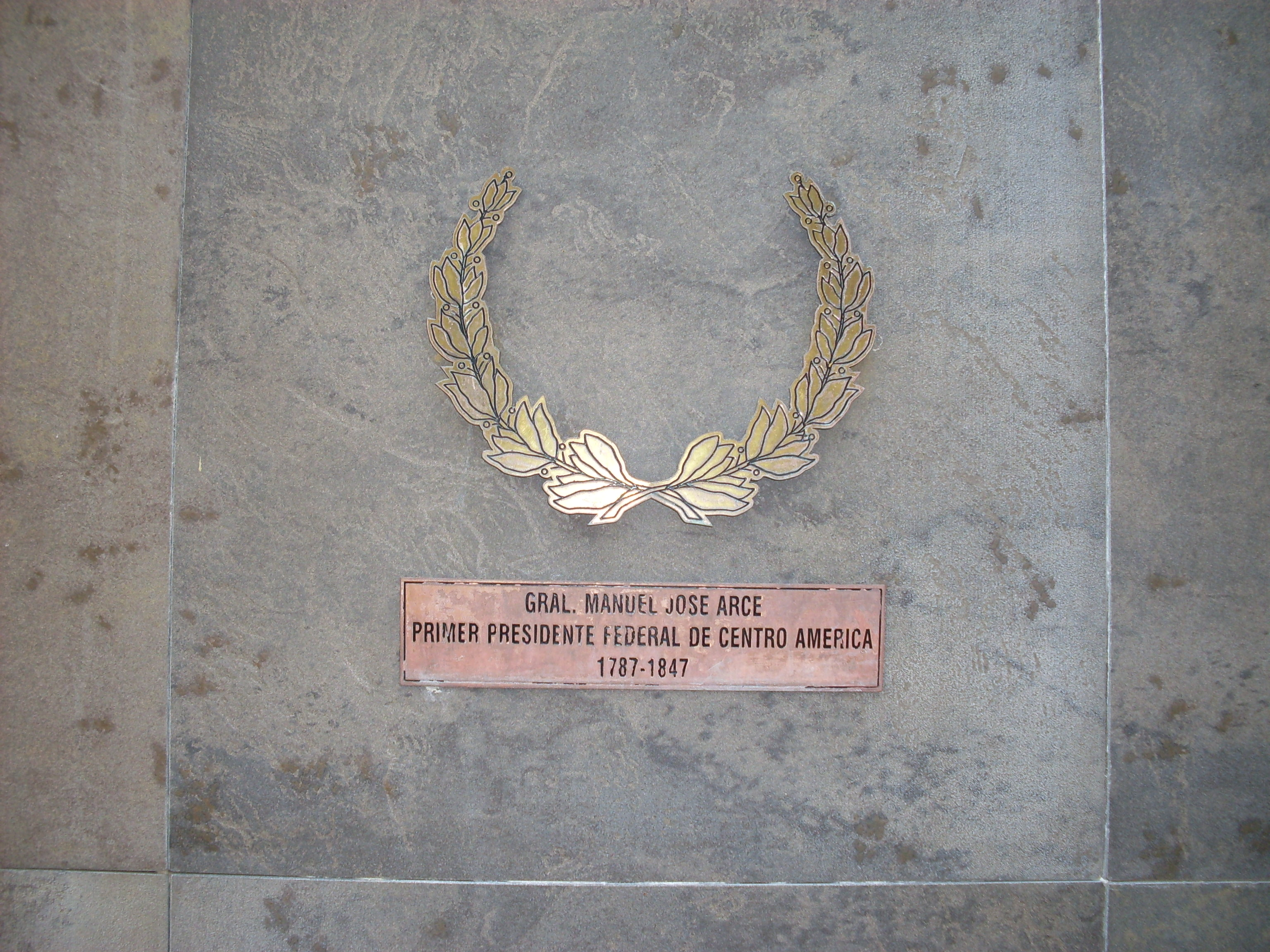
Niche containing the remains of Manuel José Arce in the Monument to the National Heroes in the El Zapote Barracks in San Salvador, El Salvador.

Arce died in poverty in San Salvador on 14 December 1847. His remains were interred at La Merced Church in San Salvador until 7 January 2003 when his remains were relocated to the Military Museum of the Armed Forces of El Salvador.

On 28 November 1947 the Legislature elevated the town of El Chilamatal to a city, renaming it in the process city of Ciudad Arce.

Political offices
Preceded by José Cecilio del Valle	President of Central America; 1825–1829	Succeeded by Mariano Beltranena y Llano
