= Captaincy General of Guatemala =

1609–1821 Spanish colony in Central America

Captaincy General of Guatemala Capitanía General de Guatemala (Spanish)
- 1527–1821
- Flag Coat of arms
- Motto: Plus ultra "Further Beyond"
- Anthem: Marcha Real "Royal March"
- New Spain in 1794, with the Captaincy General of Guatemala shown in pink

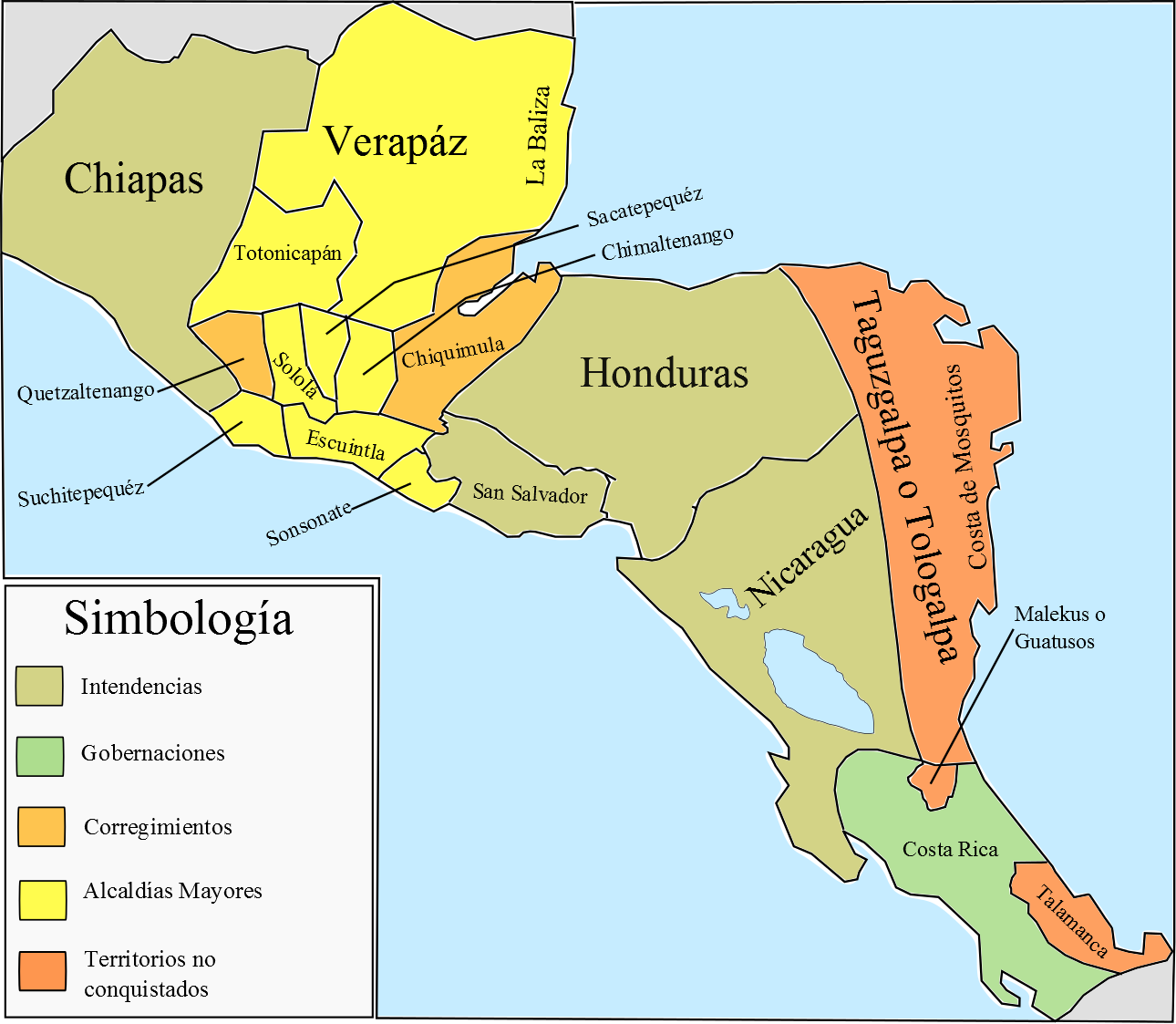
- The captaincy general in 1800
- Status: Captaincy general of the Spanish Empire (New Spain)
- Capital: Santiago de Guatemala (1527–1776); Guatemala City (1776–1821)
- Common languages: Spanish (official); Mayan languages; Nawat; Lenca
- Religion: Catholicism
- Government: Captaincy general
- King
  - 1527-1556: Charles I (first)
  - 1808-1821: Ferdinand VII (last)
- Captain General
  - 1527-1541: Pedro de Alvarado
  - 1821: Gabino Gaínza (last)
- Legislature: Real Audiencia of Guatemala
- Historical era: Spanish America
  - Established by King Charles I: 1527
  - Disestablished: 15 September 1821

Population
  - 1778: 811,675
Preceded by	Succeeded by
Cuzcatlan; Indigenous peoples of the Americas	Captaincy General of Guatemala (Mexico)
- Today part of: Belize, Costa Rica, El Salvador, Guatemala, Honduras, Mexico, Nicaragua

The Captaincy General of Guatemala (Spanish: Capitanía General de Guatemala), also known as the Kingdom of Guatemala (Spanish: Reino de Guatemala), was an administrative division of the Spanish Empire, under the viceroyalty of New Spain in Central America, including present-day Costa Rica, Nicaragua, Honduras, El Salvador, Guatemala, and the Mexican state of Chiapas. The governor-captain general was also president of the Royal Audiencia of Guatemala, the superior court.

== Antecedents ==
Colonization of the area that became the Captaincy General began in 1524. In the north, the brothers Gonzalo and Pedro de Alvarado, Hernán Cortés and others headed various expeditions into Guatemala and Honduras. In the south Francisco Hernández de Córdoba, acting under the auspices of Pedro Arias Dávila in Panama, moved into what is today Nicaragua.

=== Moving of the capital ===
The colonial coat of arms of Antigua Guatemala and Guatemala City.

The capital of Guatemala has moved many times over the centuries. On 27 July 1524, Pedro de Alvarado declared the Kaqchikel city Iximche the first regional capital, styled Santiago de los Caballeros de Guatemala ("St. James of the Knights of Guatemala"). However, hostilities between the Spaniards and the Kaqchikel soon made the city uninhabitable.

In 1526 the Spanish founded a new capital at Tecpán Guatemala. Tecpán is the Nahuatl word for "palace". Tecpán is sometimes called the "first" capital because it was the first permanent Spanish military center, but the Spaniards soon abandoned it due to Kaqchikel attacks that made defense of the city untenable.

In 1527, the capital was moved to the Almolonga Valley to the east, on the site of today's San Miguel Escobar district of Ciudad Vieja, near Antigua Guatemala. This settlement was destroyed by a catastrophic lahar from Volcan de Agua in 1541, and the survivors abandoned the site.

In 1543, the capital was again refounded several kilometres away at Antigua Guatemala. Over the next two centuries, this city would become one of the richest of the New World capitals. However, it too was destroyed, this time by a devastating series of earthquakes, and the city was ordered abandoned in 1776.

The final and current capital is the modern-day Guatemala City.

=== Role of the church ===
The Church played an important role in the administration of the overseas possessions of the Spanish crown. The first dioceses were established in León, Nicaragua and Guatemala in 1534. Another diocese was created in Chiapas in 1539. The dioceses of Guatemala and Chiapas were suffragan to the Archdiocese of Seville, until 1546 when they were placed under the Archdiocese of Mexico. The Diocese of León was made suffragan to Archdiocese of Lima in 1546. Another short-lived diocese was set up in Verapaz, Guatemala in 1559. Along the Caribbean coast, there were several attempts to establish a diocese in Honduras—which finally succeeded in 1561 with the Diocese of Comayagua—which was placed under the Archdiocese of Santo Domingo.

In 1543 the territory of the kingdom was defined with the establishment of the Audiencia of Guatemala, which took most of Central America as its jurisdiction. This audiencia, along with the one in Lima, took over the territory of the first Audiencia of Panama. It was the first institution to define Central America (with the exception of Panama) as a region within the Spanish Empire.

== Establishment ==
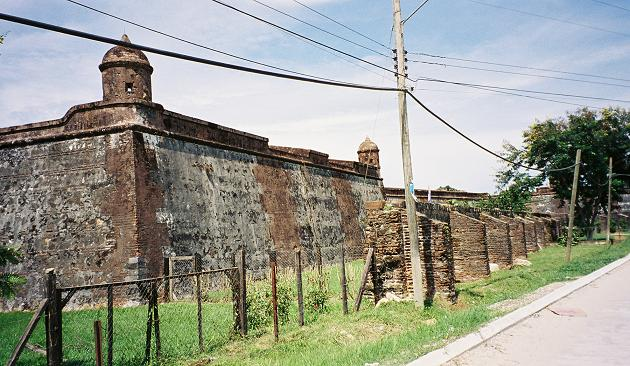
The Fort of San Fernando, Omoa. Built by the Spaniards to defend against pirates.

In 1609 the area became a captaincy general, when the governor and Audiencia president was also granted the title of captain general to deal with foreign threats to the area from the Caribbean, granting the area autonomy in administrative and military matters. Around the same time Habsburg Spain created other captaincies general in Puerto Rico (1580), Cuba (1607) and Yucatán (1617).

In the 17th century, a process of uniting the church hierarchy of Central America also began. The dioceses of Comayagua and León became suffragan to the Archdiocese of Mexico in 1620 and 1647, respectively. Finally, in the 18th century, Guatemala was raised to an archdiocese in 1743 and the dioceses of León, Chiapas and Comayagua were made suffragan to it, giving the region unity and autonomy in religious matters.

As part of the Bourbon Reforms in 1786 the crown established a series of intendancies in the area, which replaced most of the older corregimientos. The intendants were granted broad fiscal powers and charged with promoting the local economy. The new intendancies were San Salvador (El Salvador), Ciudad Real (Chiapas), Comayagua (Honduras), and León (Nicaragua).

The governor-captain general-president of Guatemala became the superintendente general of the territory and functioned as the de facto intendant of Guatemala proper. The agricultural, southern region of Costa Rica remained under a civil and military governor with fiscal oversight only over military expenses; the expenses of the civil government were handled by the intendant of León. These intendancies helped shape local political identity and provided the basis of the future nations of Central America.

== Independence ==
With the removal of Ferdinand VII during the Peninsular War, independence movements broke out in the intendancies of San Salvador and León in 1811, which were quickly suppressed. In 1812 the Cortes of Cádiz divided the region into two provinces: Guatemala (consisting of Guatemala, Belize, Chiapas, Honduras and El Salvador) and Nicaragua y Costa Rica. These provinces existed from 1812 to 1814 and once again from 1820 to 1821, the period during which the Spanish Constitution of 1812 was in effect. The two provinces elected seven deputies to the Cortes during the first period.

The jefe político superior (governor) of Guatemala remained the Captain General of Central America and Chiapas. The Captaincy General ended in 1821 with the signing of the Act of Independence of Central America, after which the regional elite supported the Plan of Iguala and joined the First Mexican Empire by annexation. With the exception of Chiapas, the region peacefully seceded from Mexico in July 1823, establishing the United Provinces of Central America. While the region remained politically cohesive for a short time, centrifugal forces soon pulled the individual provinces apart by 1842.
