= 1833 Central American federal election =

| ← 1830 | late 1833 | 1835 → |
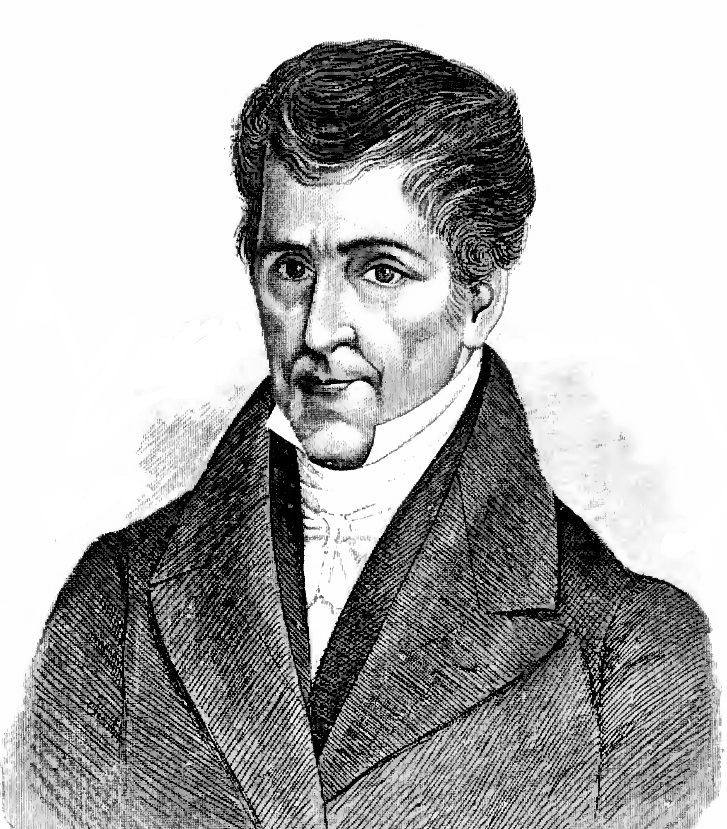

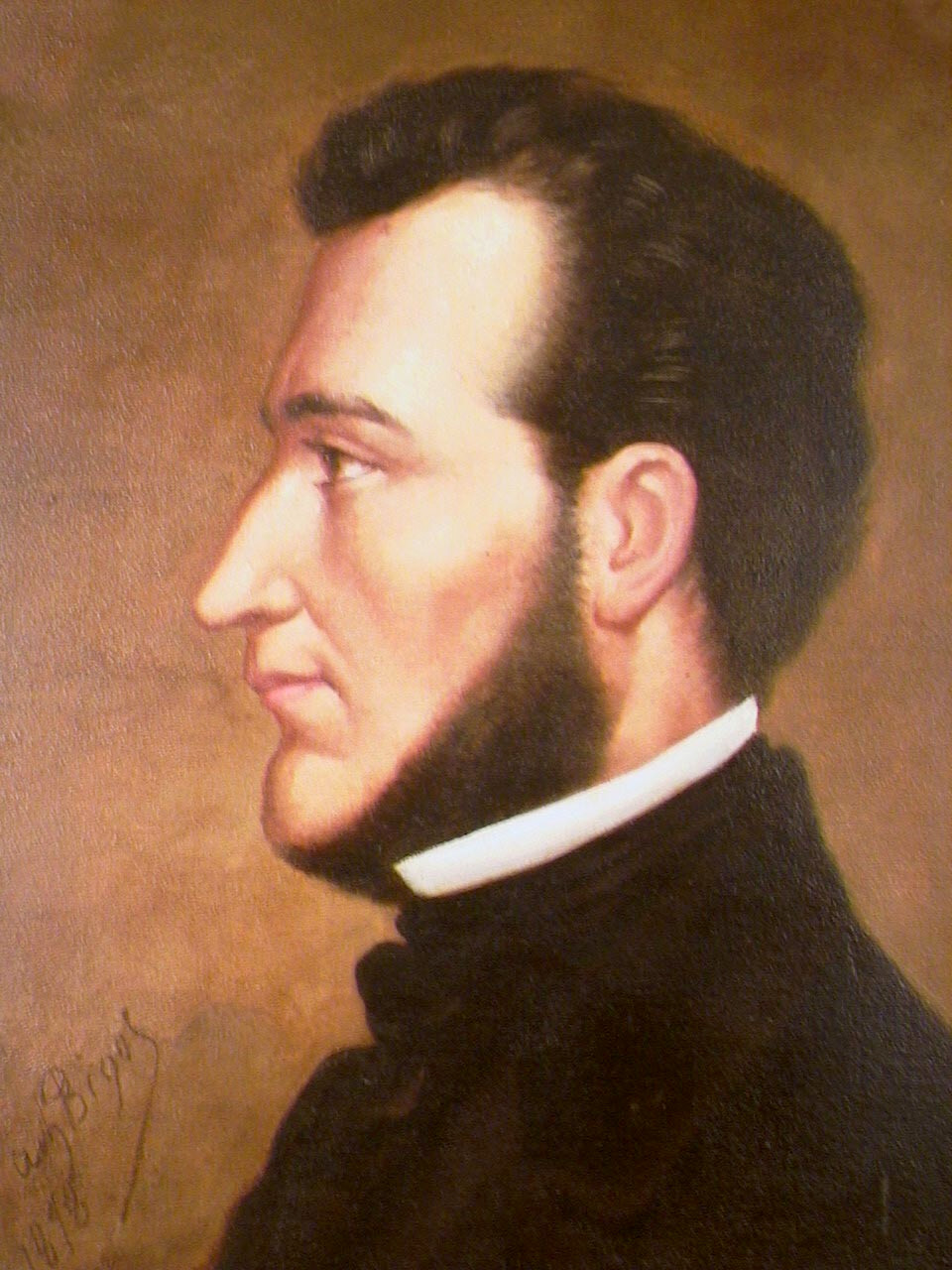
| Nominee | José Cecilio del Valle | Francisco Morazán |
| Party | Conservative | Liberal |
| Home state | Honduras | Honduras |
President before election
Francisco Morazán
Liberal
Elected President
José Cecilio del Valle
Conservative

Federal elections were held in the Federal Republic of Central America in late 1833.

Incumbent president Francisco Morazán's first four-year term as president had led to him becoming very unpopular among the liberal elites that were his main supporters, due to him moving the federal capital from Guatemala to El Salvador. As a result, moderate conservative leader José Cecilio del Valle was elected president.

Valle died before taking the oath while traveling between Honduras and Guatemala. On 2 June 1834, the Federal Congress for a new presidential election to be held for February 1835. José Gregorio Salazar served as interim president between the two elections.
