= 1835 Central American federal election =

← 1833	2 February 1835
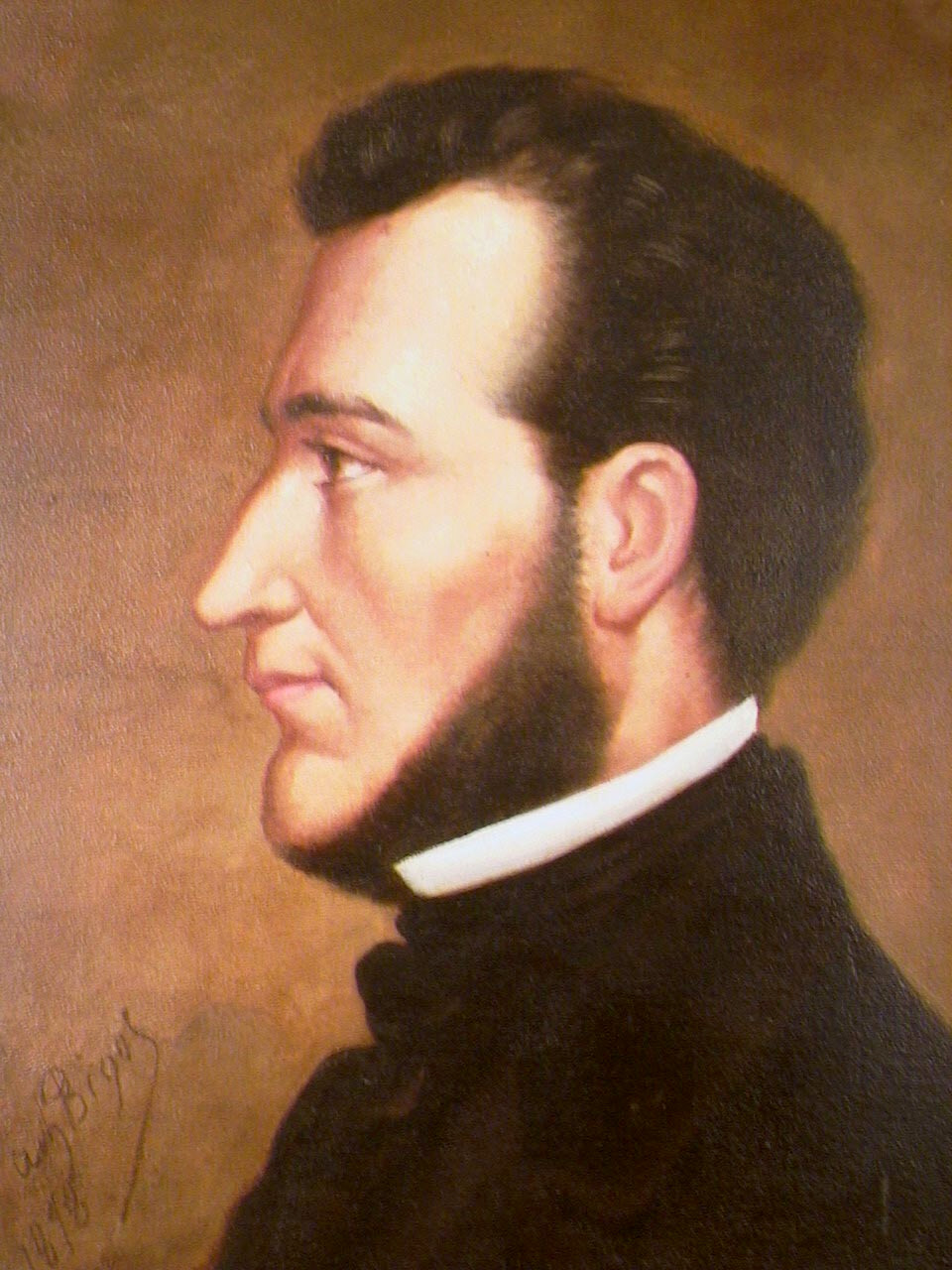
Nominee	Francisco Morazán
Party	Liberal
Home state	Honduras
President before election
José Gregorio Salazar
Liberal
Elected President
Francisco Morazán
Liberal

Early presidential elections were held in the Federal Republic of Central America on 2 February 1835 following the unexpected death of president-elect José Cecilio del Valle during a journey from his native Honduras and the Federation's capital in Guatemala to take the oath. Valle had been elected in June 1834 and was due to take office in 1835.

The elections saw former president and Liberal leader Francisco Morazán win virtually unopposed. However, they were to be the last elections in the Federation, as it was dissolved in 1839, before the end of Morazán's term in office.
