= 1825 Central American federal election =

- 21 April 1825
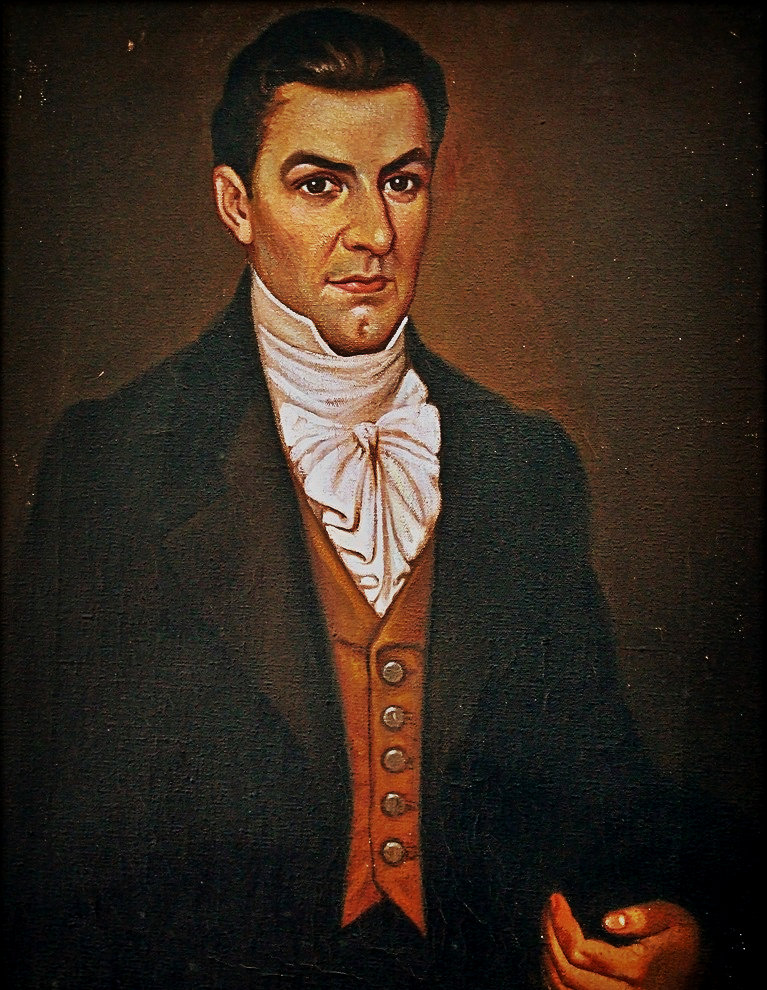

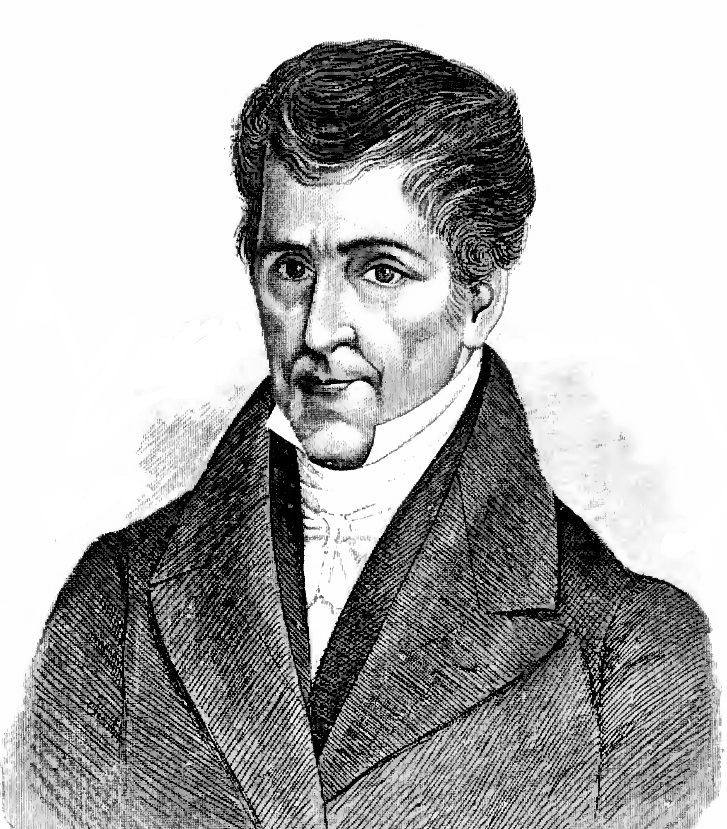
Nominee	Manuel José Arce	José Cecilio del Valle
Party	Liberal	Conservative
Home state	El Salvador	Honduras
Electoral college	34	41
Congressional vote	22	5
Elected President
Manuel José Arce
Liberal

General elections were held in the Federal Republic of Central America in 1825 to elect the President of Central America, a post established by the 1824 Central American constitution. The Liberal-dominated Federal Congress called the election, which was held in all five member states; Costa Rica, El Salvador, Guatemala, Honduras and Nicaragua. The two main parties were the Liberals and the Conservatives.

In order to win, a candidate had to receive a majority of the votes in the 82-member electoral college. If no candidate received a majority, Congress would elect the president. Conservative candidate José Cecilio del Valle received 41 votes, one short of a majority. As a result, a vote in Congress was held between del Valle the liberal Manuel José Arce. Despite del Valle receiving the most votes in the electoral college, the Liberal-led Congress elected Arce by 22 votes to five, much to the outrage of Valle and his supporters.

== Results ==
Candidate	Party	Electoral college		Congressional vote	
Candidate	Party	Votes	%	Votes	%
José Cecilio del Valle	Conservatives	41	51.90	5	18.52
Manuel José Arce	Liberals	34	43.04	22	81.48
Alejandro Díaz Cabeza de Vaca		2	2.53		
José María Castilla		1	1.27		
José Santiago Milla		1	1.27		
Total		79	100.00	27	100.00
Total votes		79	–		
Registered voters/turnout		82	96.34		
Source: Hernández de León, Flemion

== Aftermath ==
Arce tried to appease Valle by offering him the Vice-Presidency, but Valle declined. Although he retired from Congress without calling for an uprising, the First Central American Civil War broke out in 1826 as Arce's centralism and authoritarian government caused an uprising of the Liberals in El Salvador and Honduras after Arce dissolved the Parliament in Guatemala the same year. Arce would eventually resign as president and the war would only end when rebel leader Francisco Morazán took over Guatemala in 1829, calling for new elections soon afterwards.
