= List of heads of state of the Federal Republic of Central America =

President of the Federal Republic of Central America
- Presidente de la República Federal de Centro América
- Coat of arms of the Federal Republic of Central America

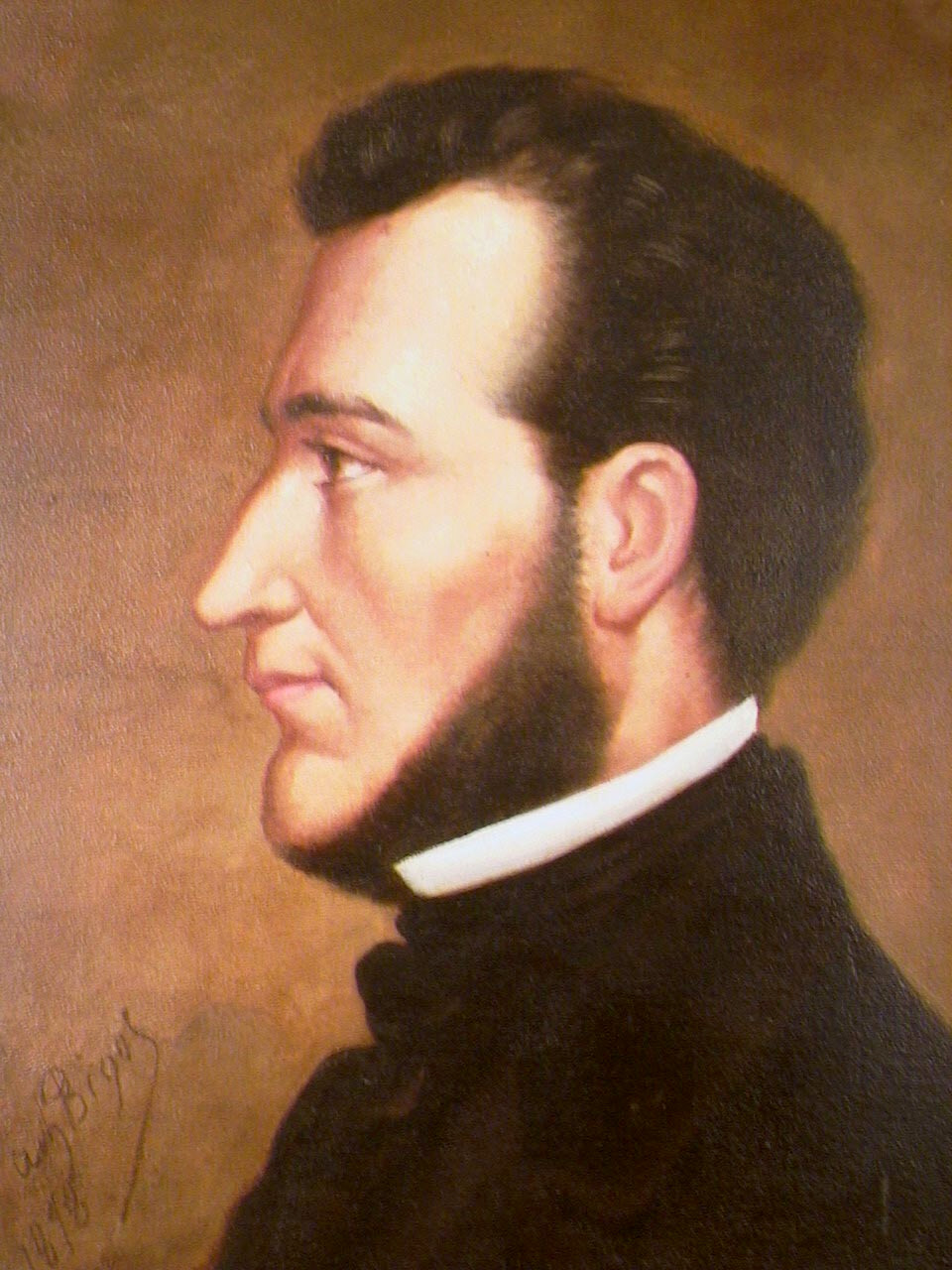
- Longest serving Francisco Morazán; 16 September 1830 – 16 September 1834; 14 February 1835 – 1 February 1839
- Style: His Excellency
- Appointer: Electoral college
- Term length: 4 years
- Precursor: Captain General of Guatemala
- Formation: April 1825
- First holder: Manuel José Arce
- Final holder: Diego Vigil y Cocaña (interim)
- Abolished: 31 March 1840
- Superseded by: President of Costa Rica; President of El Salvador; President of Guatemala; President of Honduras; President of Nicaragua

This is a list of heads of state of the Federal Republic of Central America from its founding in 1821/1823 until its dissolution in 1840.

== Heads of state ==
=== Superior Political Chiefs ===
No	Portrait	Head of State	Term of office			Party
No	Portrait	Head of State	Took office	Left office	Time in office	Party
1		Gabino Gaínza	15 September 1821	5 January 1822	112 days	Independent
Part of the First Mexican Empire (5 January 1822 – 1 July 1823)
2		José Matías Delgado	1 July 1823	10 July 1823	9 days	Independent

=== First Triumvirate ===
No	Portrait	Head of State	Term of office			Party
No	Portrait	Head of State	Took office	Left office	Time in office	Party
1		Pedro Molina Mazariegos	10 July 1823	4 October 1823	86 days	Liberal
2		Antonio Rivera Cabezas	10 July 1823	4 October 1823	86 days	Liberal
3		Juan Vicente Villacorta Díaz	10 July 1823	4 October 1823	86 days	Liberal

=== Second Triumvirate ===
No	Portrait	Head of State	Term of office			Party
No	Portrait	Head of State	Took office	Left office	Time in office	Party
1		Tomas O'Horan	4 October 1823	29 April 1825	1 year and 207 days	Independent
2		José Santiago Milla Pineda Arriaga	4 October 1823	5 February 1824	124 days	Independent
3		Juan Vicente Villacorta Díaz	6 October 1823	15 March 1824	161 days	Liberal
4		José Cecilio del Valle	5 February 1824	29 April 1825	1 year and 83 days	Conservative
5		Manuel José Arce	15 March 1824	20 October 1824	219 days	Liberal
6		José Manuel de la Cerda y Aguilar	20 October 1824	29 April 1825	191 days	Independent

=== Presidents ===
Political parties

Conservative
Liberal

No.	Portrait	Name (Birth–Death)	Elected	Term of office			Political affiliation	Ref.
No.	Portrait	Name (Birth–Death)	Elected	Took office	Left office	Time in office	Political affiliation	Ref.
—	José Cecilio del Valle	José Cecilio del Valle (1780–1834)	1825	Election nullified by the Federal Congress			Conservative	
1	Manuel José Arce	Manuel José Arce (1787–1847)	1825	29 April 1825	14 February 1828	2 years and 291 days	Liberal	
–	Mariano Beltranena y Llano	Mariano Beltranena y Llano (1781–1866); Interim President	–	14 February 1828	13 April 1829	1 year and 58 days	Conservative	
–	Francisco Morazán	Francisco Morazán (1792–1842); De Facto President	–	13 April 1829	25 June 1829	73 days	Liberal	
–	José Francisco Barrundia	José Francisco Barrundia (1787–1854); Interim President	–	25 June 1829	16 September 1830	1 year and 81 days	Liberal	
2	Francisco Morazán	Francisco Morazán (1792–1842)	1830	16 September 1830	16 September 1834	4 years and 0 days	Liberal	
–	José Cecilio del Valle	José Cecilio del Valle (1780–1834)	1833	Died in 1834 before assuming office			Conservative	
–	José Gregorio Salazar	José Gregorio Salazar (1773–1838); Interim President	–	16 September 1834	14 February 1835	151 days	Liberal	
(2)	Francisco Morazán	Francisco Morazán (1792–1842)	1835	14 February 1835	1 February 1839	3 years and 352 days	Liberal	
–	Diego Vigil y Cocaña	Diego Vigil y Cocaña (1799–1845); Interim President	–	1 February 1839	31 March 1840	1 year and 59 days	Liberal	

== See also ==
- Federal Republic of Central America
