= Constitution of 1824 =

Constitution of 1824 may refer to:

- The 1824 Constitution of Mexico
- The Brazilian Constitution of 1824
- The Constitution of the Federal Republic of Central America
