= 1830 Central American federal election =

- 1830
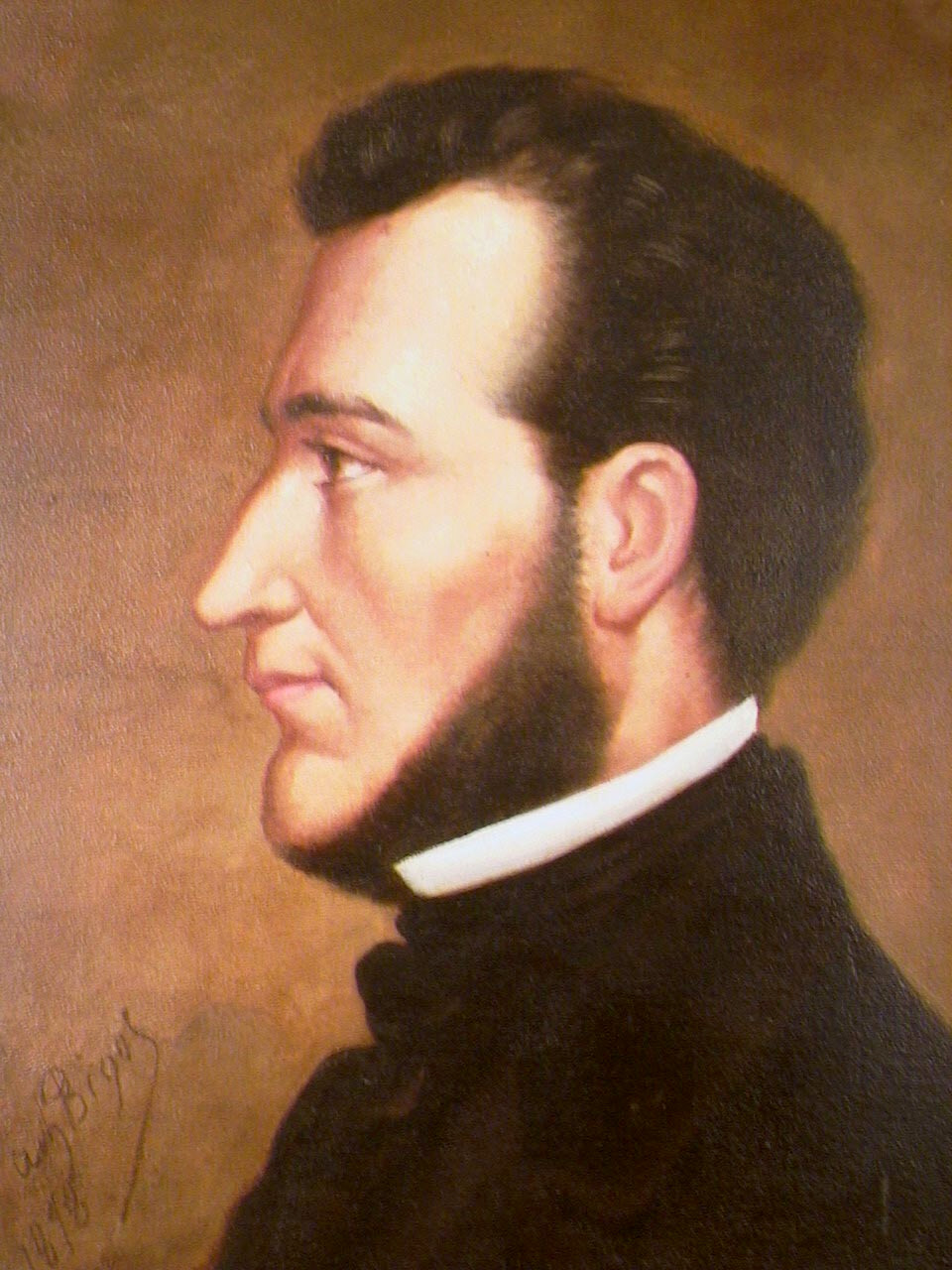

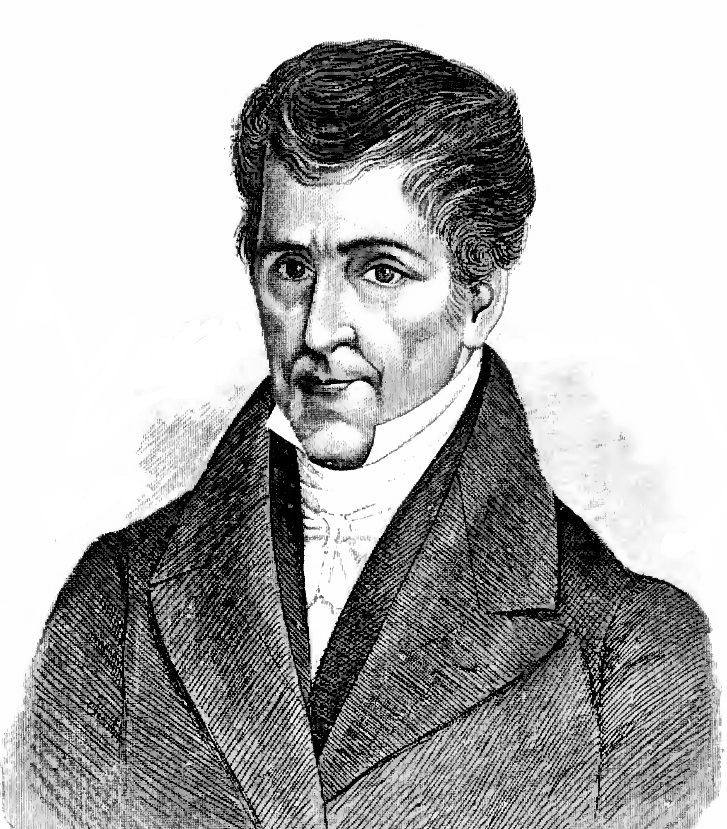
Nominee	Francisco Morazán	José Cecilio del Valle
Electoral vote	202	103
President before election
José Francisco Barrundia (interim)
Liberal
Elected President
Francisco Morazán
Liberal

Federal elections were held in the Federal Republic of Central America in 1830. They followed the victory of rebel liberal leader Francisco Morazán in the First Central American Civil War in 1829 when he took Guatemala City. Following the end of the war, Morazán urged Congress for new elections.

The main presidential candidates were conservative leader José Cecilio del Valle and Morazán himself. After the popular vote, Morazán obtained 202 electoral votes and Valle 103, still less than required for both to win according to the constitution, a situation that had also occurred in the 1825 elections. This time the liberal-dominated Congress chose to respect the popular vote, which favoured Morazán, proclaiming him president for a four-year term. Valle accepted the results.
