= The Mitre Law =

Argentinian law (passed 1907)

The Mitre Law, or Ley 5315 is a law passed in Argentina in 1907. The law overall did not enact any new principals, but its purpose was to justify and simplify the concession laws and overall regulations in Argentina with regard to the railroad industry. It was more of a gesture to foreign investors that had initially invested in building the Argentinian railroad system in the 19th century. The rail industry was very profitable for foreign investors in the 20th century, and the Mitre Law ensured that similar regulations would be continued and thus Argentina hoped for increased investment into their developing economy. it had the effect of an increase in foreign investments in railroads notably from British companies. Since Argentina lacked the iron and coal resources that were essential to an expanding economy during the industrial revolution, the Argentinian government had to offer generous deals with foreign investors because of the lack of such resources. The law permitted all railway companies, and not just foreign owned ones, to import most of their raw materials tax-free.

== Criticisms of the Mitre Law ==
The Mitre Law follows similar practices of Liberalism in other Latin American countries, meaning opening their economies to European countries such as Great Britain, and France, also including lower tax rates to promote business growth. The Mitre Law included a clause that ensured that a 3% tax on net profits from the rail industry would go back to rebuilding and maintaining stations across Argentina. Investors however did not like this tax, even though low, it would slow profitability over time.

== See also ==
- Economy of Argentina
