= Constitution of the Federal Republic of Central America =

Former constitution of the Federal Republic of Central America

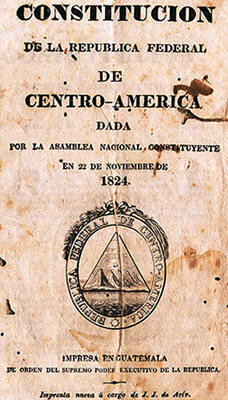

Overview
- Jurisdiction: Federal Republic of Central America
- Created: 12 June 1824
- Presented: 4 July 1824
- Ratified: 22 November 1824
- System: Federal presidential republic

Government structure
- Branches: 3
- Chambers: Bicameral
- Executive: President
- Judiciary: Supreme Court
- Federalism: Federation
- Electoral college: Yes
- First legislature: 6 February 1825
- First executive: 29 April 1825
- First court: 29 April 1825
- Repealed: 17 April 1839
- Location: Guatemala City, Guatemala

The constitution of the Federal Republic of Central America (Spanish: constitución de la República Federal de Centro América) was the governing document of the Federal Republic of Central America from 1824 to 1839. It was inspired by both the United States Declaration of Independence and the Spanish Constitution of 1812

== History ==
On 1 July 1823, Central America declared its independence from Mexico after having been a part of Mexico since January 1822. The political leaders who declared independence from Mexico established the National Constituent Assembly, and the assembly was tasked with drafting a constitution for the newly independent United Provinces of Central America (later named the Federal Republic of Central America).

On 28 June 1824, the National Constituent Assembly drafted the country's constitution. It was published on 4 July, and on 22 November, the assembly officially ratified the constitution. The constitution was repealed upon the dissolution of the Federal Republic of Central America on 17 April 1839.

== Contents ==
The constitution established a federal government composed of a legislative, executive, and judicial branch. All officials in these branches were elected through indirect elections. The legislative branch consisted of the Federal Congress (itself composed of the Senate and the Council of Deputies); the executive branch consisted of the president, the vice president, and the cabinet; and the judicial branch consisted of the Supreme Court. The constitution granted most of the federal government's power, including the executive power, to the Federal Congress; American historian William F. Slade described the federal government established by the constitution as a "parliamentary dictatorship".

== Historical assessment ==
The Central American constitution was loosely based on the United States federal government, the United States Declaration of Independence, and the 1812 Spanish constitution. Central American historians have criticized the constitution as being "too idealistic", and cited this as a contributing factor to the collapse of the Federal Republic of Central America.
