= María Dolores Bedoya =

Guatemalan activist (1783–1853)

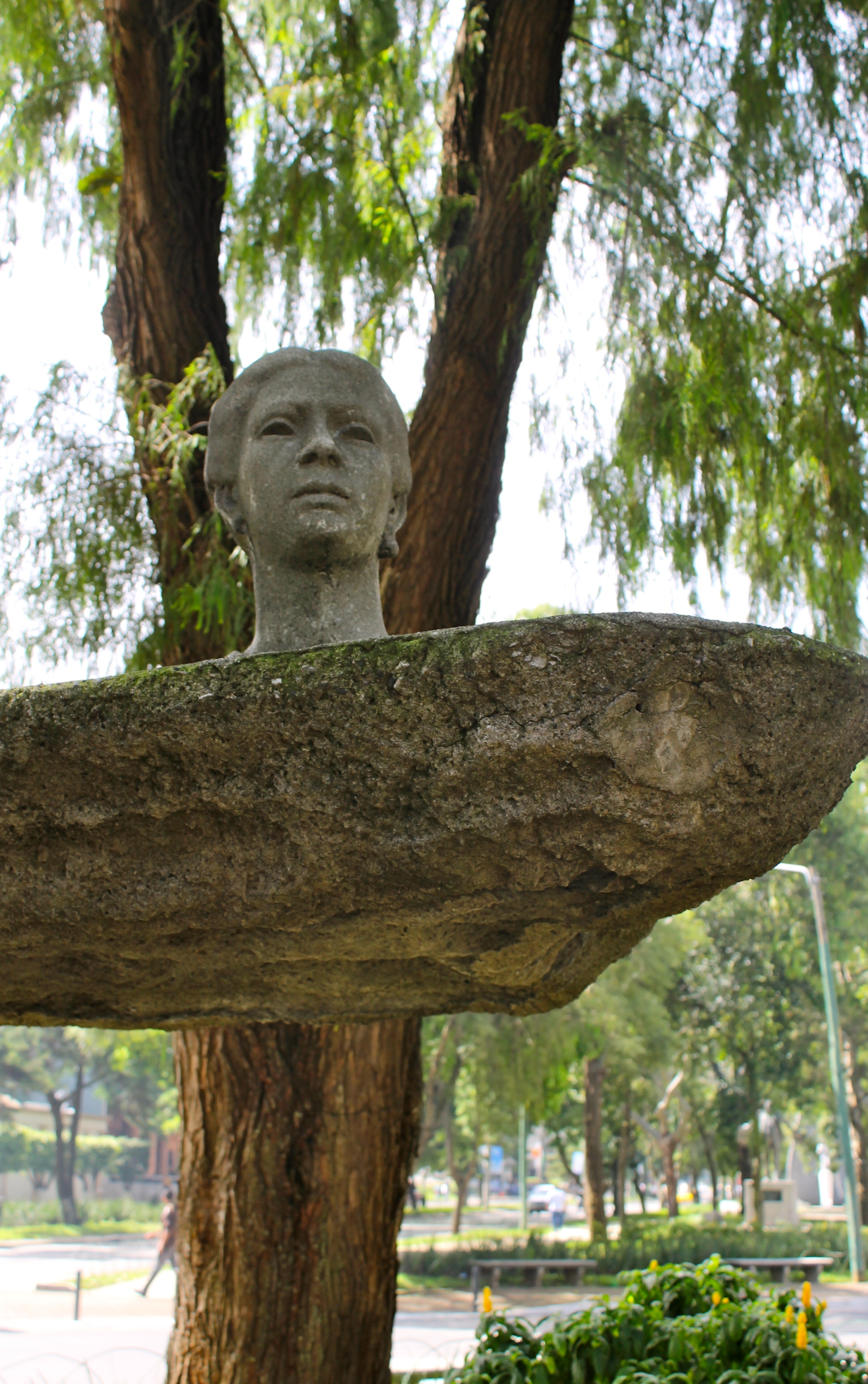
- A monument to María Dolores Bedoya in Guatemala
- Born: September 20, 1783; Escuintla, Captaincy General of Guatemala
- Died: July 9, 1853 (aged 69); Guatemala City, Republic of Guatemala
- Occupation: Activist
- Spouse: Pedro Molina Mazariegos
- Children: 2

María Dolores Bedoya de Molina (September 20, 1783 – July 9, 1853) was a Guatemalan activist. She is remembered for her role in the movement for Central America's independence from Spain in the early 19th century.

== Biography ==
Bedoya was born in Guatemala in 1783. In 1804, she married physician (and later politician and independence leader) Pedro Molina. The couple moved to Granada, Nicaragua, where Molina served as a battalion doctor until 1811; they returned to Guatemala in 1814.

Bedoya is remembered for her role in Central America's quest for independence from the Spanish Empire. She is credited with mobilizing women to participate in the independence movement. She is said to have travelled the streets of Guatemala City on the eve of September 15, accompanied by Basilio Porras, to garner support for independence.

On September 15, 1821, while nobility gathered to debate the issue of independence, Bedoya led a celebration among a crowd of advocates outside the palace. With music, fireworks, and a lively crowd, Bedoya's celebration is said to have spurred on the decision to sign for independence, as those inside the palace heard their noises and feared being attacked by the group.

Bedoya's brother Mariano was assassinated in 1821 and the Molina-Bedoya family left Guatemala City for Verapaz. Her husband later became Head of State of Guatemala from 1823 to 1831.

The couple lived their remaining years in political exile in Antigua, Guatemala. Bedoya died in 1853 after suffering from a long-term illness.

== Legacy ==
Bedoya's contributions to the independence movement have a limited presence in written records because of social attitudes to women at the time. Today, she is recognized as a Guatemalan national hero. As a tribute, in part, to her role in garnering support for independence, and to commemorate Independence Day, people in Guatemala parade through the streets on September 14.

One of her dresses is displayed in the Guatemalan National History Museum. In 1983, on the 200th anniversary of her birth, a statue of Bedoya was erected outside of a school named in her honour in Guatemala City. On September 15, 2018, the biographical Guatemalan film, Dolores Bedoya: Una Mujer de Coraje, premiered in theatres across the country.
