= Antonio Rivera Cabezas =

Mexican politician

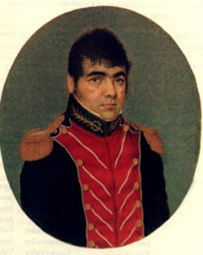
Antonio Rivera

Antonio Rivera Cabezas (died May 8, 1851) was a Liberal Central American lawyer and politician. From July 10, 1823, to October 4, 1823, he was a member of the first executive triumvirate that governed the Federal Republic of Central America. From March 9, 1830, to February 10, 1831, he was head of state of Guatemala.

Rivera was a cadet in the militia, a position reserved for the sons of noble families. He became a lawyer during the Spanish colonial period.

Rivera held many political positions. He was a provincial deputy under the Spanish. He was also a supporter of independence from Spain and one of the signers of the declaration of independence on September 15, 1821. He was a deputy to the first Central American constituent congress. After annexation of Central America to Mexico, he was a deputy to the Mexican congress. He was a member of the governing triumvirate of the federation in 1823, political chief of the department of Guatemala in 1824, secretary of finance of the federation in 1835, and a district judge in 1832 and 1837.

As a member of the triumvirate, on July 1, 1823, he signed the declaration of independence of Central America from Spain, Mexico, and all other countries.

He was also an author of several satirical works on popular economics.

From March 9, 1830, when the Assembly removed Doctor Pedro Molina, to February 10, 1831, Rivera was head of state of Guatemala, within the federation. During his administration, the country enjoyed a period of peace. He worked to reestablish schools that had been destroyed during the wars of independence and introduced new schools in Chiquimula. He also founded a school in Guatemala City and another in Quetzaltenango, and introduced the Lancastrian Method.

He ordered a census to be held. He tried to improve the administration of justice and created the Division of Departmental Roads (Dirección de Caminos Departamentales), which still exists today. However, due to the continuous defamations of his Conservative opponents, he resigned his office in 1831.

When the Conservatives took power, he was going to be shot, but the intervention of several friends saved his life. He went into exile in Chiapas. When he tried to return through Honduras he was arrested at Jocotán, Chiquimula and accused of conspiracy. He managed to take refuge in El Salvador, where he was allied with Doctor Pedro Molina.

He died in 1851. He was buried with little ceremony.
