= Federal Republic of Central America =

Former country in Central America (1823–1839/1841)

Coordinates: 13°41′56″N 89°11′29″W

Federal Republic of Central America República Federal de Centro América
- 1823–1839/1841
- Flag Coat of arms
- Motto: Dios, Unión, Libertad "God, Union, Liberty"
- Anthem: La Granadera "The Grenadier"
- An orthographic projection of the world with the Federal Republic of Central America in green and its uncontrolled territorial claims (British Honduras and Mosquito Coast) in light green
- Capital: Guatemala City (until 1834); Sonsonate (1834); San Salvador (from 1834)
- Common languages: Spanish and various indigenous languages
- Religion: Catholicism
- Demonym: Central American
- Government: Federal presidential republic
- President
  - 1825–1828: Manuel José Arce (first)
  - 1829, 1830–1834, 1835–1839: Francisco Morazán (last)
- Legislature: Federal Congress (Note: From 1823 to 1825, the National Constituent Assembly served as the de facto legislature of Central America.)
  - Upper house: Senate
  - Lower house: Chamber of Deputies
- Historical era: Spanish American wars of independence
  - Independence from the Spanish Empire: 15 September 1821
  - Independence from the First Mexican Empire: 1 July 1823
  - Constitution adopted: 22 November 1824
  - Dissolution: 17 April 1839
  - El Salvador declares its independence: 30 January 1841

Area
  - Total: 200,000 sq mi (520,000 km^{2})

Population
  - 1824: 1,287,491
  - 1836: 1,900,000
- Currency: Central American real
Preceded by
First Mexican Empire
Succeeded by
Costa Rica
El Salvador
Guatemala
Honduras
Los Altos
Nicaragua

The Federal Republic of Central America (Spanish: República Federal de Centro América), initially known as the United Provinces of Central America (Provincias Unidas del Centro de América), was a sovereign state in Central America that existed between 1823 and 1839/1841. The republic was composed of five states (Costa Rica, El Salvador, Guatemala, Honduras, and Nicaragua), and a Federal District from 1835 to 1839. Guatemala City was its capital city until 1834, when the seat of government was relocated to San Salvador. The Federal Republic of Central America was bordered on the north by Mexico, on the south by Gran Colombia and on the east by the Kingdom of Mosquitia and British Honduras, both claimed by the federal republic.

After Central America (then the Captaincy General of Guatemala) declared its independence from the Spanish Empire in September 1821, it was annexed by the First Mexican Empire in January 1822 before regaining its independence and forming a federal republic in 1823. The Federal Republic of Central America adopted its constitution, based on that of the federal government of the United States, in November 1824. It held its first presidential election in April 1825, during which liberal politician Manuel José Arce was elected as the country's first president. Arce subsequently aligned himself with the country's conservatives due to liberal opposition to the concessions he granted conservatives to secure his election as president. The republic was politically unstable, experiencing civil wars, rebellions, and insurrections by liberals and conservatives. From 1827 to 1829, it fell into a civil war between conservatives who supported Arce and liberals who opposed him. Liberal politician Francisco Morazán led the liberals to victory, and was elected president in 1830. The republic descended into a second civil war from 1838 to 1840, by the end of which the states of Central America declared independence and the federal republic ceased to exist.

Historians have attributed the country's political instability to its federal system of government and its economic struggles. Agricultural exports were insufficient and the federal government was unable to repay its foreign loans, despite favorable terms. Central America's economic troubles were caused in part by the federal government's inability to collect taxes and inadequate interstate infrastructure.

Central American politicians, writers, and intellectuals have called for the reunification of Central America since the dissolution of the Federal Republic of Central America. There have been several attempts by the republic's successor states during the 19th and 20th centuries to reunify Central America through diplomatic and military means, but none succeeded in uniting all five former members for more than one year. All five former members of the Federal Republic of Central America are members of the Central American Integration System (SICA), an economic and political organization that promotes regional development.

== Names ==
The country's initial name, adopted at independence from the First Mexican Empire on 1 July 1823, was the United Provinces of Central America (Spanish: Provincias Unidas del Centro de América). (Note: "Provincias Unidas del Centro de América" is literally "United Provinces of the Center of America" in English.) Upon the adoption of the country's constitution on 22 November 1824, the United Provinces of Central America changed its name to the Federal Republic of Central America (República Federal de Centro América). In the years shortly after independence, some official government documents referred to the country as the Federated States of Central America (Estados Federados del Centro de América). The federal republic has also been referred to as the Federation of Central America (Federación de Centro América).

== Background ==
=== Colonial Central America ===
The Spanish conquered Central America in the 16th century. The region was divided into several audiencias (jurisdictions) until, in 1542, it was organized into a single audiencia extending north to the Isthmus of Tehuantepec and south to the Isthmus of Panama. Spain transferred control of the Yucatán Peninsula to New Spain (modern-day Mexico) in 1560, and transferred control of Panama to Peru seven years later. In 1568, the Central American audiencia was reorganized as the Captaincy General of Guatemala. The captaincy was subdivided into corregimientos, gobiernos, greater mayorships, and intendancies.

Central America had a caste system, with Spaniards at the top, mixed-race individuals in the middle, and Africans and indigenous Central Americans at the bottom. Spaniards owned most of the region's land and wealth, and indigenous people composed most of its labor force. The Catholic Church dominated all aspects of Central American society during Spanish colonial rule. Although the region's indigenous inhabitants were gradually forced by colonial officials to convert to Catholicism, they retained many of their cultural traditions.

=== Central American independence ===
The Spanish king Ferdinand VII was overthrown in 1808 by the French emperor Napoleon, who installed his brother Joseph as king of Spain. Spain's colonies in the Americas (including the Captaincy General of Guatemala) did not recognize Joseph as the legitimate king and established provisional governments, known as juntas, which continued to recognize Ferdinand as king. Although the Central American colonial government remained loyal to Ferdinand, some criollo leaders in Central America wanted greater autonomy. In November 1811, José Matías Delgado and Manuel José Arce launched a rebellion in San Salvador against Spanish rule which was defeated by loyalist forces. Additional independence rebellions occurred in December 1811 in Nicaragua; in 1813 in Guatemala; and in 1814 in San Salvador. All were defeated by loyalist forces, but pro-independence sentiment spread among Central American leaders.

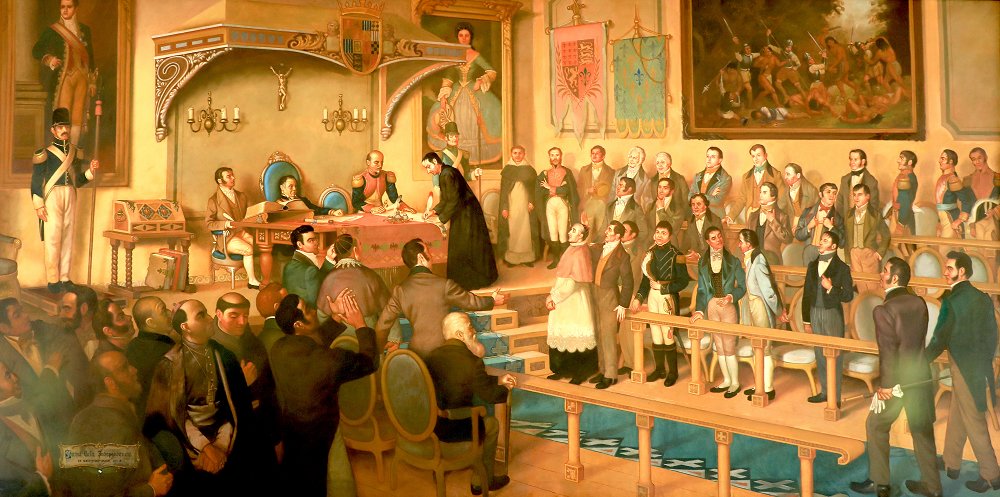
Firma del Acta de Independencia by Luis Vergara Ahumada (20th century)

The Cortes of Cádiz (a Spanish constitutional congress in Cádiz) drafted the Spanish Constitution of 1812, which made Spain a constitutional monarchy. Ferdinand repealed the liberal constitution after returning to power in 1814, since he wanted to rule as an absolute monarch. His refusal to rule as a constitutional monarch and the desire of colonial leaders for greater local autonomy led to independence rebellions throughout Spain's American colonies. The rebellions were primarily led by liberals who supported the 1812 constitution's Enlightenment ideals. Conservatives joined the independence movements in 1820, when Ferdinand was forced by Colonel Rafael del Riego to restore the 1812 constitution. On 15 September 1821, Central American colonial leaders declared independence from Spain and signed the Act of Independence of Central America. They established the Consultive Junta to temporarily govern the region until a permanent government could be established. Most government administrators, including Brigadier General Gabino Gaínza (the final captain general of Guatemala), retained their positions.

After independence, Central American leaders were ideologically divided about whether to remain independent or to join the First Mexican Empire; monarchists supported annexation, opposed by republicans and nationalists. Mexican Regent (and later Mexican Emperor) Agustín de Iturbide asked the Consultive Junta to join the First Mexican Empire in November 1821, and the junta voted for annexation on 5 January 1822. The Mexicans sent Brigadier General Vicente Filísola to enforce the annexation. Liberals in Costa Rica, El Salvador, and Nicaragua resisted Mexican attempts to annex the region. Liberals and conservatives fought in Costa Rica's Ochomogo War, which ended with the liberals gaining control of the country. Liberal rebels in El Salvador, led by Delgado and Arce, resisted two invasions by Filísola in 1822 and 1823. The former ended with an armistice and Mexican withdrawal; the latter resulted in Filísola overthrowing Delgado as the political leader of El Salvador (forcing Arce to flee to the United States) and capturing the city of San Salvador. General José Anacleto Ordóñez launched a rebellion against conservative Nicaraguan political leader Miguel González Saravia y Colarte, capturing several cities. Ordóñez's rebellion continued after Central America declared its independence from Mexico.

On 19 March 1823, Iturbide abdicated the Mexican throne. When news of Iturbide's abdication reached Filísola on 29 March, he called for Central American political leaders to establish a congress to determine the region's future. The Mexican Constituent Congress ordered Mexican forces in Central America to cease hostilities on 1 April, and the Central American congress convened on 24 June. Except for the state of Chiapas, it declared Central American independence from Mexico on 1 July.

== History ==
=== National Constituent Assembly ===
==== Drafting the constitution ====
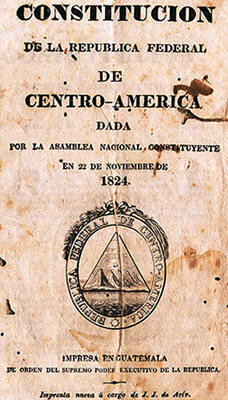
The constitution of the Federal Republic of Central America

At Central America's independence from Mexico, the Central American congress established the United Provinces of Central America. The following day, the congress reorganized as the National Constituent Assembly and tasked itself with drafting a constitution for newly-independent Central America. José Matías Delgado was Central America's provisional president until 10 July 1823, when the National Constituent Assembly appointed a triumvirate consisting of Arce, Juan Vicente Villacorta and Pedro Molina Mazariegos. Since Arce was in the United States when the triumvirate was established, Antonio Rivera Cabezas was appointed as his substitute. The three rotated executive power on a monthly basis.

Initially, the National Constituent Assembly was composed of delegates from El Salvador and Guatemala; Costa Rica, Honduras, and Nicaragua did not send their delegates until October 1823, refusing to send them until Mexican soldiers withdrew from Central America. The National Constituent Assembly consisted of 64 delegates, distributed across Central America. (Note: The 64 delegates were distributed as follows: 28 delegates from Guatemala, 13 from El Salvador, 11 from Honduras, eight from Nicaragua, and four from Costa Rica.) The National Constituent Assembly was the de facto government of Central America until the constitution was adopted. Its two political factions were the liberals and the conservatives; the liberals supported federalism, and the conservatives supported centralism.

The National Constituent Assembly drafted the constitution on 12 June 1824, and published it on 4 July. The constitution was inspired by the federal government of the United States, the United States Declaration of Independence, and the Spanish Constitution of 1812. On 22 November, the constitution was formally adopted after all 64 members of the assembly signed it. The National Constituent Assembly dissolved itself on 23 January 1825, and was succeeded by the Federal Congress on 6 February.

==== Guatemalan mutiny ====
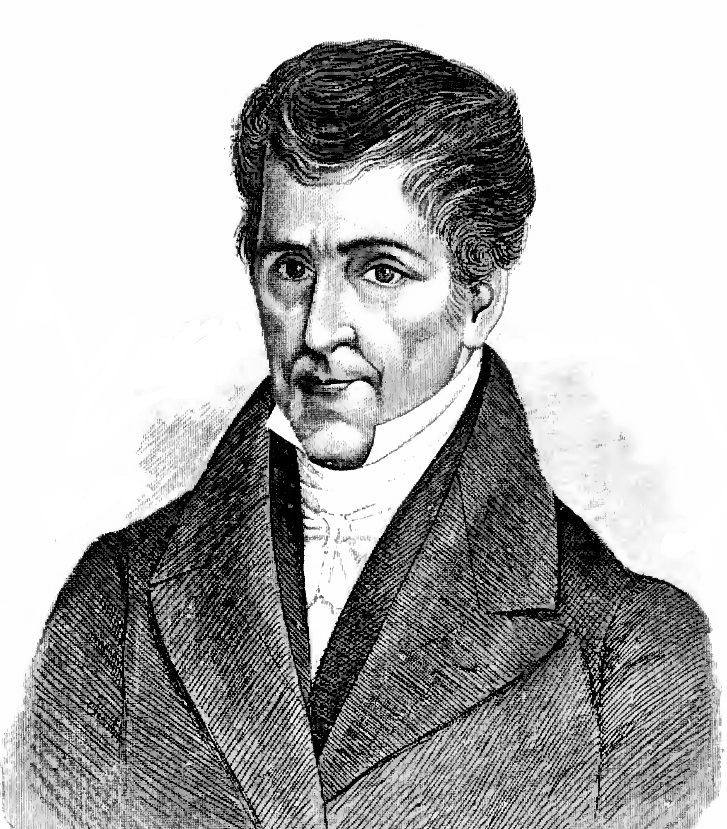
A drawing of José Cecilio del Valle

On 14 September 1823, Captain Rafael Ariza y Torres began an insurrection in Guatemala City (the capital city) because the Central American government was unable to pay its debts to the military. Although Ariza pledged his loyalty to the National Constituent Assembly, many assembly members fled the city and called on soldiers from Chiquimula, Quetzaltenango, and San Salvador to suppress the insurrection. Neither Ariza's rebels nor Colonel José Rivas and his 750 soldiers from San Salvador wanted a battle. Conservatives took advantage of the situation, and forced the triumvirate to resign on 6 October. They installed a second, less-liberal triumvirate consisting of Arce, José Cecilio del Valle, and Tomás O'Horan. Since Arce and Valle were outside the country when the second triumvirate was formed, José Santiago Milla and Villacorta were substitutes. Valle and Arce did not sit on the triumvirate until February and March 1824, respectively.

The second triumvirate ordered Rivas to march 150 soldiers into Guatemala City and, soon afterwards, Ariza fled into exile in Mexico. The National Constituent Assembly then returned to Guatemala City. The Salvadoran government ordered Rivas to remain near Guatemala City and verify that the assembly was functioning. On 12 October 1823, Rivas determined that the National Constituent Assembly was suppressing civil liberties and marched back into the city. On 17 October, believing that Rivas was acting on behalf of El Salvador, 200 soldiers from Quetzaltenango arrived in Guatemala City and skirmished with his forces. After a few days, the assembly drafted an agreement to appease both sides. Rivas' forces withdrew to El Salvador, and the soldiers from Quetzaltenango returned home.

==== Internal conflict in Nicaragua ====
Liberals and conservatives had been fighting for control of Nicaragua since Ordóñez launched his rebellion against the pro-Mexico Nicaraguan government in 1823. The liberals had control of León (the liberal capital) and Granada, and the conservatives controlled Managua (the conservative capital), Rivas and Chinandega. Clashes resulted in hundreds of deaths. In October 1824, the second triumvirate sent Colonel Manuel Arzú to attempt to mediate peace between the liberals and conservatives. The mediation failed, and Arce led a federal invasion of Nicaragua on 22 January 1825 to end the civil conflict. His invading force got the liberals and conservatives to sign an armistice without engaging in combat. Arce dissolved both rival governments, and their leaders were exiled from Nicaragua.

=== Presidency of Manuel José Arce ===
==== 1825 election ====
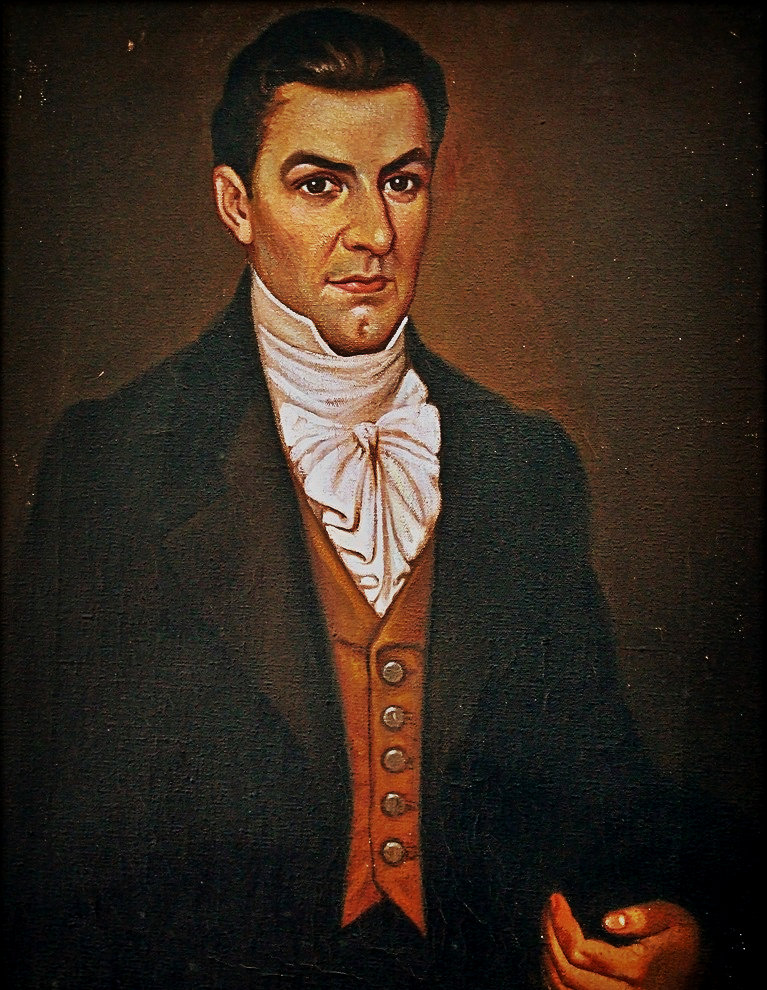
A painting of Manuel José Arce

The federal republic's first presidential election was held on 21 April 1825. Arce was the liberals' candidate, and Valle the conservatives' choice. During the election, 41 of the 82 electors voted for Valle; 34 voted for Arce, four voted for other candidates, (Note: The other candidates were Alejandro Díaz Cabeza de Vaca (two votes) and José María Castilla and José Santiago Milla (one vote each).) and three did not vote due to complications in receiving votes from their electoral districts. No candidate received a majority; the constitution required a majority, and the Federal Congress was tasked with electing the president instead. The congress voted 22–5 to elect Arce president. Valle was entitled to become vice president since he was the runner-up in the election, but refused to accept the position; so did liberal José Francisco Barrundia. Ultimately, the conservative Mariano Beltranena became Arce's vice president. Arce and Beltranena took office on 29 April.

Arce's electoral victory angered conservatives who backed Valle, and alienated liberals (particularly Guatemalan liberals) because he had won the votes of conservative senators by promising to allow the Federal Congress to decide if a Catholic archdiocese would be created in El Salvador; the conservatives opposed the archdiocese because Delgado, a liberal symbol of Salvadoran independence, would have become archbishop. The liberals considered Arce's compromise with the conservatives as betraying his liberal positions. Liberals Molina Mazariegos and Mariano Gálvez refused to accept cabinet appointments as secretary of relations and secretary of finance, respectively, due to this perceived betrayal. Arce appointed conservatives to his cabinet as a result, which led to liberals continuing to accuse him of betraying the liberal cause.

==== Path to civil war ====
Juan Barrundia, José Francisco Barrundia's brother, opposed the federal government and was one of Arce's foremost critics. He moved Guatemala's capital back to Guatemala City from Antigua Guatemala in mid-1825 (reversing the 1823 move) and seized private property to establish state government offices, since the federal government still occupied the state's government buildings. After Juan Barrundia threatened to raise an army to "contain the despotism of a tyrant" (referring to Arce), the Federal Congress agreed to vacate the building used by the federal treasury and give it to the Guatemalan state government.

In August 1825, in response to the arrival of 28 French warships in the Caribbean Sea, Arce called for the army to raise 10,000 soldiers to defend their country against a European invasion. The Congress of Deputies approved Arce's plan; the Senate vetoed it, however, citing a lack of funding. In mid-1826, Arce reduced his troop requirement to 4,000. Guatemalan liberals in the Federal Congress contacted French military officer Nicolás Raoul to help draft a military code to prevent Arce from controlling the military, and Arce expelled Raoul from the country. Eventually, Arce and the Federal Congress compromised; the congress approved the raising of 4,000 soldiers, and Raoul oversaw recruitment. Despite a minor rebellion in Costa Rica led by José Zamora, who called himself a "vassal of the king of Spain", the feared European invasion did not take place. As the liberals tried to circumvent his role as commander-in-chief, Arce refused to implement laws passed by the Federal Congress; the liberals began impeachment proceedings against him on 2 June 1826. Salvadoran liberals, still loyal to Arce, did not attend the impeachment proceedings and prevented the congress from reaching the quorum necessary to begin them. Ten days later, the Guatemalan liberals abandoned their impeachment attempt.

Arce sent federal soldiers to arrest Raoul in July 1826, accusing him of insubordination by sending letters to Arce calling for his resignation. Juan Barrundia sought to defend Raoul and sent 300 Guatemalan soldiers to arrest the federal soldiers' commander, arguing that the federal government needed a state governor's permission to move soldiers within a state. When Arce sought to formally condemn Juan Barrundia, liberal Guatemalan senators boycotted the meeting and the Senate failed to reach the quorum necessary to condemn Barrundia. Despite Senate inaction, Arce had Barrundia arrested and removed from office on 6 September for attempting to conspire against the federal republic. In response to Barrundia's arrest, Lieutenant Governor Cirilo Flores moved the Guatemalan state government to Quetzaltenango and passed several anti-clerical laws. An indigenous mob, spurred by conservatives and the church, attacked and killed Cirilo on 13 October for passing the laws. Arce invaded Quetzaltenango and defeated those who continued to support the remnants of Cirilo's government on 28 October.

==== First civil war ====
In October 1826, Arce called for a special election to install a new Guatemalan government; the conservatives won, and Mariano Aycinena became governor of Guatemala on 1 March 1827. After the election, many liberals fled Guatemala for El Salvador in search of assistance from its liberals to regain power. They spread rumors that Arce was controlled by the Guatemalan conservatives and that would establish a centralized government. Arce called for an extraordinary congress to convene in Cojutepeque on 10 October to reestablish constitutional order, since the Federal Congress consistently failed to reach a quorum after Juan Barrundia's arrest. The call for an extraordinary congress was unconstitutional, because it exceeded Arce's presidential duties. On 6 December, in response to Arce's call for an extraordinary congress, Mariano Prado (the liberal acting governor of El Salvador) called for delegates from all the states except Guatemala to convene their own extraordinary congress in Ahuachapán. Ultimately, neither congress convened.

Prado ordered Salvadoran soldiers to the El Salvador–Guatemala border in late December 1826 to prepare to overthrow Arce. Aycinena declared leading Guatemalan liberals, including Molina Mazariegos and Rivera Cabezas, as outlaws in Guatemala in early March 1827. Prado ordered his soldiers to invade Guatemala in response, beginning the First Central American Civil War without a formal declaration of war. Honduras supported El Salvador's invasion, but Arce's federal soldiers defeated the invasion in a 23 March battle at Arrazola (near Guatemala City). Arce launched a counter-invasion into El Salvador and was defeated on 18 May at Milingo, near San Salvador.

While Arce was campaigning in El Salvador, he sent a division of soldiers commanded by Colonel José Justo Milla into Honduras to arrest liberal Honduran Governor Dionisio de Herrera. Milla's forces captured the Honduran capital of Comayagua on 10 May 1827 after a 36-day siege, and captured Herrera. Francisco Morazán—secretary general of Honduras in 1824, a Honduran state senator, and a military officer—was captured shortly afterwards in Tegucigalpa; Morazán escaped and fled to Nicaragua, where he rallied an army of Honduran exiles to oppose Arce. his forces were supported by Nicaraguan rebels led by Ordóñez, who launched an anti-Arce rebellion in León. Morazán's army defeated Milla's army at the Battle of La Trinidad on 10 November 1827, recapturing Comayagua and Tegucigalpa.

Arce offered to hold a presidential election in early 1828 in an attempt to appease the liberals, who declined his offer. He resigned the presidency on 14 February and fled to Mexico; Beltranena succeeded Arce as interim president. Morazán invaded El Salvador in June 1828 with an army of Honduran and Nicaraguan soldiers, capturing San Salvador on 23 October. In late 1828, Morazán raised 4,000 soldiers for an invasion of Guatemala. Beltranena's government warned its citizens that Morazán's primary objective was to destroy the Catholic Church; Morazán refuted the Guatemalan government's warning, saying that his Christian "Protective Allied Army of the Law" ("Ejército Aliado Protector de la Ley") did not seek to destroy the church and sought only to liberate Guatemala from "the wrongs [they had] suffered" (los males que habéis sufrido"). He invaded in January 1829, and began besieging Guatemala City on 5 February. The city surrendered on 12 April and Morazán's soldiers entered it the following day, ending the civil war.

=== Presidency of Francisco Morazán ===
==== Consolidating power ====
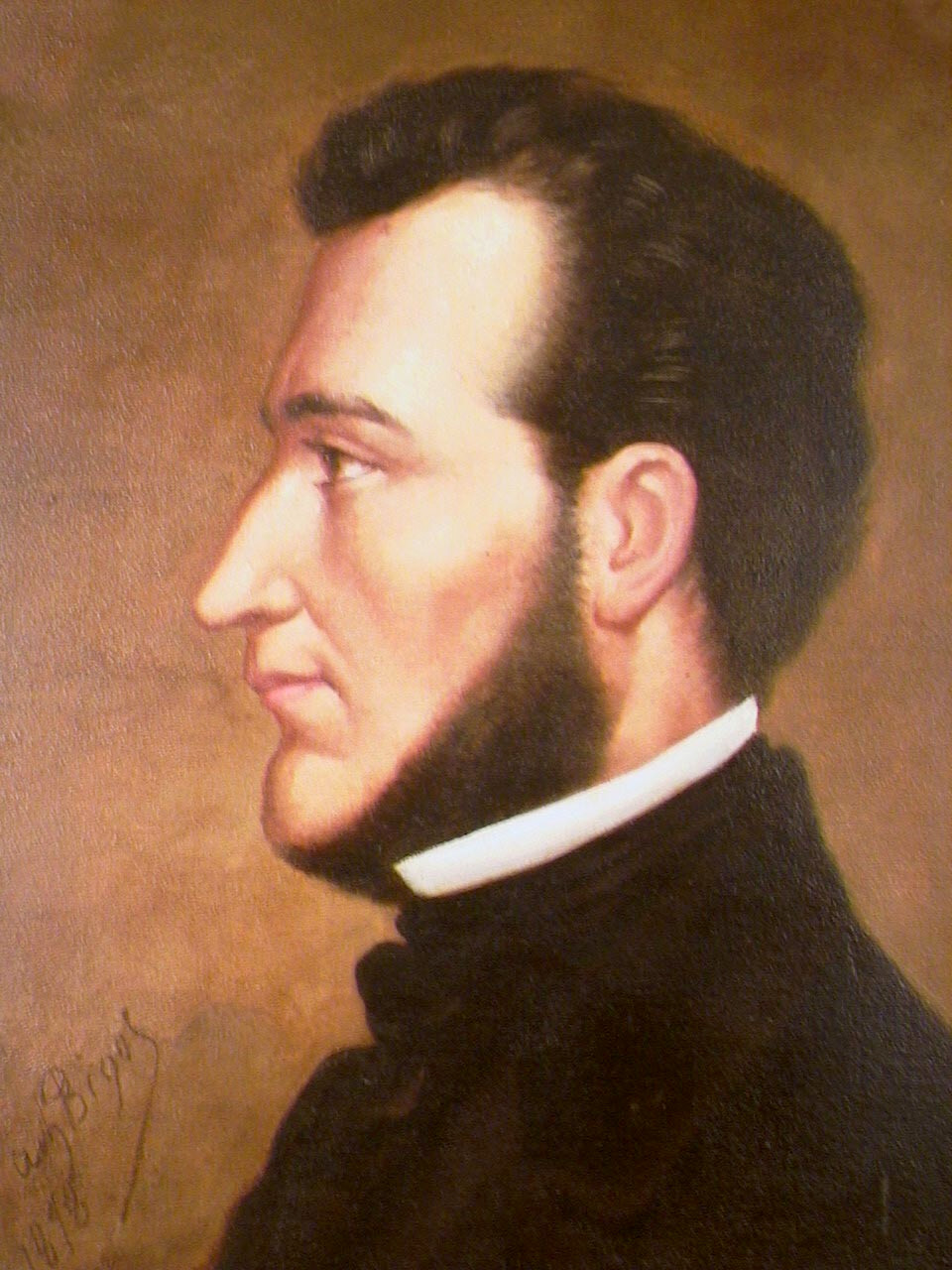
A painting of Francisco Morazán

After capturing Guatemala City in April 1828, Beltranena was removed from the presidency; Morazán became the de facto president of Central America, but did not officially assume office. On 22 June 1829, Morazán appointed a new Federal Congress. It elected José Francisco Barrundia, the Senate's senior member, as Central America's interim president three days later. At Morazán's instruction, the Federal Congress declared all legislation passed after September 1826 null and void. Many leading conservatives were imprisoned or exiled under threat of death after the civil war, and many also had their property confiscated. Morazán also cracked down on the church. He expelled many members of the clergy from the country for supporting the conservatives, confiscated Church properties, and forced the church to reduce the number of priests and nuns in the country.

Morazán ran for president in the 1830 federal election. Although he finished first, with 202 electoral votes, he did not win a majority. (Note: The total electoral votes cast were 202 for Francisco Morazán, 103 for José Cecilio del Valle, and an unknown number of votes for José Francisco Barrundia, Antonio Rivera Cabezas, and Pedro Molina Mazariegos.) Similar to 1825, the Federal Congress was given the authority to elect the president; the liberal-dominated congress voted for Morazán, and he took office on 16 September. The Federal Congress elected Prado as Morazán's vice president.

==== 1831–1832 conservative invasion ====
In May 1829, Morazán sent a letter to the Mexican minister of external relations falsely claiming that Central American refugees fleeing to Mexico were actually enemy forces who sought to "chain and submit their towns to the Spanish yoke" ("encadenar y someter sus pueblos al yugo español"). He asked the Mexican government to extradite the refugees back to Central America. Receiving no reply, José Francisco Barrundia sent a letter to Mexican president Vicente Guerrero in November 1829 with the same request; Guerrero did not respond either. After Central American Minister of Relations Manuel Julián Ibarra sent a third request to the Mexican government to extradite the refugees in December 1829, Mexico said that it could grant the Central American request.

Arce threatened to invade the Federal Republic of Central America in late 1831 from Soconusco (a territory along the Pacific coast claimed by Central America and Mexico over which neither had full control) to reclaim the presidency. General Ramón Guzmán, mayor of the Honduran city of Omoa, declared a state of rebellion in November 1831, raised a Spanish flag in the city, and sent ships to Cuba to ask for support from conservative archbishop Ramón Casaus y Torres (exiled by Morazán in 1829). This was followed by a second conservative invasion force, led by Colonel Vicente Domínguez, that entered Central America from British Honduras and supported Guzmán's rebellion and invaded inland Honduras. The Honduran cities of Opoteca and Trujillo also declared themselves in a state of rebellion. José María Cornejo, the conservative governor of El Salvador, supported Arce's invasion and declared El Salvador's secession from the federal republic on 7 January 1832.

On 24 February 1832, Raoul led federal soldiers into Soconusco and fought Arce's rebel army in the town of Escuintla. He defeated Arce's outnumbered army, and the victorious soldiers looted the town. After this defeat, Arce fled back to Mexico. Morazán invaded El Salvador in mid-March and captured San Salvador on 28 March, proclaiming himself the provisional governor of El Salvador on 3 April. Cornejo and 38 other Salvadoran political leaders were arrested and imprisoned in Guatemala for their involvement in the rebellion. Honduran soldiers under Colonel Francisco Ferrera began a siege of Omoa in March, recaptured Trujillo in April, and recaptured Opoteca in May. Reaching the Central American coast, Guzmán's Spanish reinforcements were arrested by Honduran soldiers. He continued to resist federal forces in Omoa until 12 September, when his soldiers mutinied and turned him over to federal custody. This ended the rebellion; Guzmán was executed the following day, and Domínguez (captured by federal forces during the fall of Opoteca) was executed on 14 September.

==== Rebellions ====
On 1 April 1829, Costa Rica seceded from the Federal Republic of Central America "without separating itself" ("sin separarse") from the federal republic. The Costa Rican government justified its secession by saying that the federal government had ceased to exist. It rejoined the federal republic in February 1831 after recognizing Morazán as Central America's president and renouncing its declaration of secession. Morazán defeated July 1829 rebellions in Honduras and Nicaragua, and a rebellion in Honduras in January 1830.

In May 1832, Prado resigned as vice president of Central America to become the governor of El Salvador; however, he was not popular among El Salvador's residents for helping Morazán overthrow Arce in the civil war and Cornejo earlier in 1832. Prado imposed a tax to help raise funds for the state government. The tax was unpopular with Salvadorans – particularly indigenous Salvadorans, who saw it as a restoration of tribute to the white population that was abolished in 1811. San Salvador rebelled against Prado on 24 October, forcing his government to temporarily move to Cojutepeque. Similar rebellions against Prado broke out in Ahuachapán, Chalatenango, Izalco, San Miguel, Tejutla and Zacatecoluca, but were quickly suppressed by Salvadoran soldiers.

On 14 February 1833, indigenous laborer Anastasio Aquino launched a rebellion in San Juan Nonualco and Santiago Nonualco in response to indigenous killings by Ladinos (mixed-race people) the month before. Aquino and 2,000 supporters (known as the Liberation Army) marched on San Vicente, capturing it the following day. The Liberation Army proclaimed him as San Vicente's political chief. Indigenous Salvadorans in Cojutepeque, Ilopango, San Martín, San Pedro Perulapán, and Soyapango supported Aquino's rebellion. Initial efforts by Salvadoran soldiers to suppress the rebellion were defeated by the Liberation Army in San Vicente and Zacatecoluca, but Aquino's army was defeated in battle by Morazán in San Vicente on 28 February. This ended the rebellion; Aquino was captured in April and executed on 24 July, with his body publicly displayed in San Vicente.

==== 1830s constitutional reforms ====
In 1831, Salvadoran conservatives called for political reforms in the federal government. Reforms included allowing the president to veto laws passed by the Federal Congress, abolishing the electoral college and implementing direct elections, and restricting eligibility to hold office to landowners. The arrest of these conservatives after Morazán's military victory in El Salvador in 1832 led political leaders across the federal republic to call for political reforms. Nicaragua declared independence on 3 December 1832, citing fears of federal authoritarianism after Morazán's invasion of El Salvador, and said that it would not rejoin the federal republic until the federal constitution was reformed. That month, Costa Rica proposed establishing a National Constituent Assembly to pass a constitutional reform; th assembly began on 20 April 1833. On 13 February 1835, the Federal Congress approved constitutional reforms drafted by the National Constituent Assembly. The reforms were minor, and only Nicaragua (which renounced its secession after the reforms were completed) and Costa Rica ratified them.

==== Federal capital move to San Salvador ====
Morazán and the Federal Congress wanted to move the national capital from Guatemala City beginning in 1830, since they wanted the capital in a better defensive position and the federal government felt that the city's residents hated it due to the civil war. Morazán wanted to move the capital to San Salvador, but conservative Salvadoran political leaders resisted his proposal and seceded from the federal republic in January 1832. The federal government moved the national capital from Guatemala City to the Salvadoran city of Sonsonate on 5 February 1834, but Salvadoran politicians did not want it to move the capital to the city.

Salvadoran Governor Joaquín de San Martín believed that Morazán's moving the federal capital to San Salvador was an attempt to remove him as governor, and saw the capital's temporary relocation to Sonsonate as a threat. After nearly all of the Salvadoran state assembly resigned on 15 May 1834 due to rising tensions between San Martín and Morazán, San Martín announced his intention to resign; however, he retained his gubernatorial powers. In late May, Morazán invaded El Salvador to force San Martín out of office. Morazán captured San Salvador on 6 June, and San Martín resigned six days later. San Martín was succeeded as provisional governor by Carlos Salazar (José Gregorio Salazar's brother), and by José Gregorio Salazar on 13 July. As provisional governor, José Gregorio Salazar defeated a rebellion launched by San Martín which sought to restore him to power.

San Salvador became the federal capital in June 1834 to symbolize the liberal victory over the conservatives in the 1827–1829 civil war. The federal government established the Federal District around the city on 7 February 1835 in accordance with article 65 of the federal constitution, which called for a federal district in the country's capital when "circumstances permitted". The district covered a 20-mile (32 km) radius around San Salvador and extended 10 miles (16 km) south to the Pacific Ocean. All federal-government offices relocated to the Federal District. El Salvador temporarily moved its state government from San Salvador to Cojutepeque before permanently relocating to San Vicente on 21 September.

==== 1833 and 1835 presidential elections ====
During the late 1833 presidential election, the electoral college chose Valle as Central America's next president. Valle defeated Morazán because many voters and politicians opposed Morazán's use of military force to settle disputes between liberals and conservatives, and saw Valle as a moderate who could offer peace. Valle died of illness on 2 March 1834 while he was traveling to Guatemala to become president. As Morazán finished second in the election and retained the presidency; on 2 June, the federal government called for a new presidential election the following year. On 2 February 1835, the electoral college re-elected Morazán as Central America's president and José Gregorio Salazar as Morazán's vice president; they were sworn in on 14 February.

=== Second civil war and dissolution ===
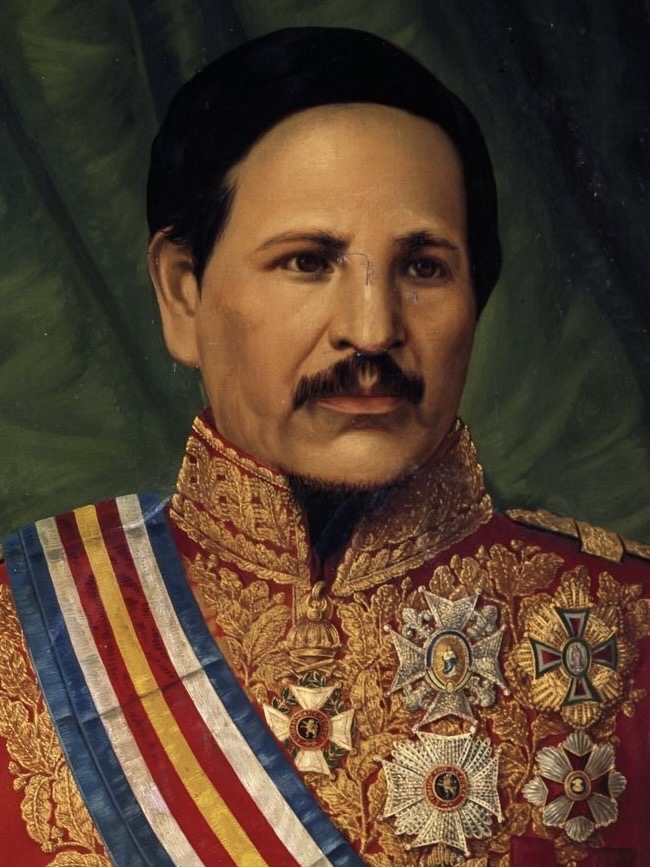
Painting of Rafael Carrera

On 30 May 1838, the Federal Congress convened and declared that each of the federal republic's five states was free to establish any form of republican government. Nicaragua seceded from the Federal Republic of Central America on 30 April 1838. Honduras did the same on 26 October, followed by Costa Rica on 15 November. On 2 February 1839, all of Central America's federally elected government officials (including Morazán) left office. They had no successors, since no federal election was held. On 17 April, Guatemalan President Rafael Carrera issued a decree dissolving the Federal Republic of Central America; the Federal Congress accepted his decree on 14 July. On 30 January 1841, El Salvador declared independence from the Federal Republic of Central America. At the fall of the federal republic, four of its five successor states were led by opponents of federal rule and proponents of their respective states' secession: Braulio Carrillo (Costa Rica), Francisco Malespín (El Salvador), Carrera (Guatemala), and Francisco Ferrera (Honduras).

== Government and politics ==
=== Federal government ===
Political organization of the Central American federal government

According to the federal constitution, the government of the Federal Republic of Central America was "popular, representative, and federal". All elected officials were appointed with indirect elections; voters chose electors who would vote on their behalf, rather than voting directly for candidates seeking public office. In presidential, vice-presidential and legislative elections, there were three rounds of voting; voters chose electors in the first round, electors voted for a further set of electors in the second round, and those electors voted for candidates seeking public office in the third round. Voting was compulsory.

The federal republic's government was divided into legislative, executive and judicial branches, with no term limits. The Federal Congress was its bicameral legislative branch. The Chamber of Deputies (the lower house) consisted of 41 deputies allocated across the states, (Note: The deputy allocation for the lower house of the Federal Congress was: 18 deputies from Guatemala, nine from El Salvador, six each from Honduras and Nicaragua, and two from Costa Rica.) with one deputy per 30,000 people. Each deputy was accompanied by a supplement deputy. Half of the Chamber of Deputies' members were elected annually. The Senate (the upper house) consisted of two senators from each state, for a total of ten senators. The Senate, which first met on 24 April 1825, acted as a de facto executive council that approved legislation passed by the Council of Deputies. An advisory body to the president, it could also review Supreme Court rulings. One-third of the Senate's members were elected every year. The Council of Deputies could override a Senate legislative veto with a two-thirds majority, or a three-fourths majority for tax legislation. From 1824 to 1838, there were a total of 11 congressional terms.

The president led the executive branch. Elected to a four-year term, he was the commander-in-chief of the Federal Army. The president had a cabinet of three secretaries (ministers): the secretary of relations, the secretary of war, and the secretary of the treasury. Article 111 of the federal constitution allowed the president to seek consecutive re-election once, after which he must leave office for at least one term before being eligible for re-election a second time. The president was relatively weak in comparison with other contemporary Latin American presidents, particularly because he could not veto or pocket veto legislation, could not send legislation back to the Federal Congress for reconsideration, and was required to enact all laws passed by the Federal Congress within fifteen days. The authors of the federal constitution sought to oppose a caudillo-like president with dictatorial powers by implementing checks on presidential power to ensure legislative supremacy. Rodrigo Facio Brenes, a 20th-century Costa Rican lawyer and rector of the University of Costa Rica, described the presidency of the Federal Republic of Central America as "merely decorative".

The Supreme Court of Justice was established on 2 August 1824 as the federal republic's judicial branch. It consisted of six justices, two of whom were elected every two years. The first justices took office on 29 April 1825. The Supreme Court could not enforce its rulings on unconstitutional laws passed by the Federal Congress, since its rulings were subject to Federal Congress review.

=== Armed forces ===
The Federal Republic of Central America found it difficult to maintain its federal army. Before Central American independence, few Central Americans pursued a military career. Guatemalan historian Manuel Montúfar y Coronado wrote that "military influence was unknown in Central America; before Independence, there was no military career" ("el influjo militar fue desconocido en Centro América; antes de la Independencia, no había carrera militar"). The Central American federal army originated as rebel groups who resisted annexation to Mexico in 1822 and 1823, and was not formally established as a political entity until 1829.

Although the president was commander-in-chief of the federal army, only the Federal Congress had the authority to raise and maintain armies and to declare war and peace. In July 1823, the Central American federal army had 10,000 soldiers. The legislature increased the size of the federal army to 11,800 soldiers in December of that year, organized into two light battalions, two squadrons, and one artillery brigade. The federal army established defensive garrisons along the Caribbean coast in case Spain attempted to reassert control of the region. George Alexander Thompson, a British diplomat who visited Central America in 1825, said that the federal army would only have been able to resist a Spanish invasion with guerrilla warfare.

By the end of 1829, the Central American federal army (now called the Protective Allied Army of the Law) totaled 4,000 soldiers. That year, the Federal Congress reduced the maximum size of the federal army to 2,000 soldiers due to general distrust by the states of the power and influence of the federal army. Each state was instructed to provide soldiers to the federal army. (Note: Contribution to the federal army's 1829 strength limit of 2,000 soldiers was divided among the federal republic's states as follows: 829 soldiers from Guatemala, 439 from El Salvador, 316 each from Honduras and Nicaragua, and 100 from Costa Rica.) The federal peacetime army, as established by the Federal Congress in 1829, consisted of three infantry brigades, one artillery brigade, and one cavalry regiment. By 1831, only 800 federal soldiers remained; the state militias had more soldiers and were better funded and equipped. During the 1830s, the federal army's military supremacy over the state militias relied on the discipline of its soldiers and public perception that a caudillo-like figure led the federal army. In 1836, Morazán said that the federal army had been reduced to "a handful of ancient veterans that have survived the greatest dangers" ("un puñado de antiguos veteranos que han sobrevivido a los mayores peligros").

=== Administrative divisions ===
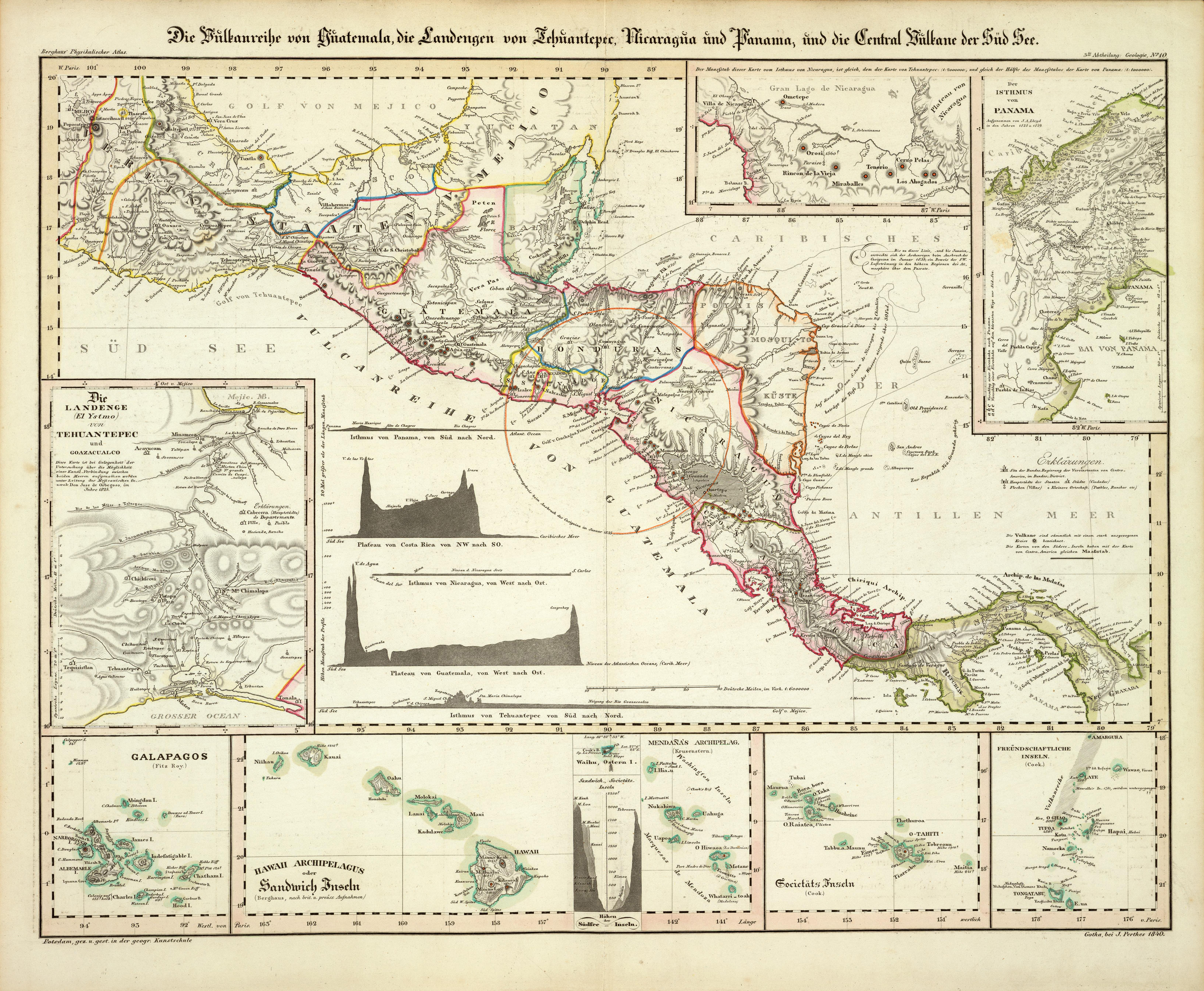
An 1840 map of the federal republic by cartographer Heinrich Berghaus

The federal republic consisted of five states: Costa Rica, El Salvador, Guatemala, Honduras, and Nicaragua. Each state was subdivided into 45 partidos (districts). From 7 February 1835 to 3 May 1839, the Federal District was centered around San Salvador as the national capital. Briefly, from 1838 to 1839, the federal government considered separating Los Altos from Guatemala and elevating it to the status of a state. Although Guatemala claimed Belize as part of its territory, coastal Belize was occupied by the British. Guatemala and Mexico claimed sovereignty over Soconusco, but neither had full control of the region. Portions of Soconusco were effectively independent, but its leaders preferred union with Central America. Central America bordered the Mosquito Coast on the Caribbean, which it claimed as part of its territory. The Federal Republic of Central America covered approximately 200,000 square miles (520,000 km^{2}) and spanned about 900 miles (1,400 km) north to south between the 8th and 18th parallel north.

On 5 May 1824, the National Constituent Assembly ordered each of the federal republic's five states to draft a constitution and install state-level legislative, executive, and judicial branches similar to those of the federal government. Each state could elect legislators, a governor, and judicial officials in indirect elections. Like the Senate at the federal level, each state's Senate was an executive council which advised the state governor. All the states drafted and ratified their constitutions by April 1826. The federal constitution recognized each state government as "free and independent" ("libre e independiente"), and the state governments could administer internal affairs not mandated for the federal government by the federal constitution.

States of the Federal Republic of Central America
State	Location (borders c. 1835–1838)	Capital city	State constitution adopted	Population (1824)	Population (1836)
Costa Rica	A map of Costa Rica within the Federal Republic of Central America	Cartago	25 January 1825	70,000	150,000
El Salvador	A map of El Salvador within the Federal Republic of Central America	San Salvador (until 1834); Cojutepeque (1834); San Vicente (1834–1839); San Salvador (from 1839)	12 June 1824	212,573	350,000
Federal District	A map of the Federal District within the Federal Republic of Central America	San Salvador (1835–1839)	Not applicable	212,573	50,000
Guatemala	A map of Guatemala and the disputed territory of Belize within the Federal Republic of Central America	Antigua Guatemala (until 1825); Guatemala City (from 1825)	11 October 1825	660,580	700,000
Honduras	A map of Honduras within the Federal Republic of Central America	Comayagua	11 December 1825	137,069	300,000
Nicaragua	A map of Nicaragua within the Federal Republic of Central America	León	8 April 1826	207,269	350,000

=== Political factions ===
The two major political factions of the Federal Republic of Central America were the liberals (also known as fiebres) and the conservatives (Note: During the existence of the Federal Republic of Central America, the conservatives did not refer to themselves as "conservatives" but as "moderates" ("moderados").) (also known as serviles). The factions were not organized political parties. Liberals and conservatives saw each other as enemies, accusing each other of "demagoguery, disorganization, and anarchism" ("demagogia, desorganización y anarquismo").

Liberals supported a federal government and the devolution of power to the country's states, considering the centralized colonial government inherently defective and radical change necessary. They attempted to implement freedom of religion in 1823. Resistance from the predominantly-Catholic population prevented implementation of the reform, however, and Catholicism was established as the country's official religion. In 1825, an executive decree required all Catholic clergymen in the country to swear an oath of allegiance to the federal republic. The clergy opposed the decree, seeing it as diminishing the power of the Catholic Church. Liberals also supported laissez-faire economic policies, free trade, and foreign immigration in an effort to improve the economy. They were primarily supported by the upper middle class and intellectuals.

Conservatives supported centralizing power around the national government, believing that the colonial centralized government structure before independence was preferable to a new system of government (federalism) which might be a burden on society. They supported protectionist economic policies and defended the role of the Catholic Church in Central American society as an arbiter of morality which preserved the status quo. The conservatives viewed Protestantism as inferior to Catholicism, and believed that the country's indigenous population should be subservient to the ruling white and mestizo population. They primarily received support from wealthy landowners, established colonial-era families, and the clergy.

=== Foreign relations ===
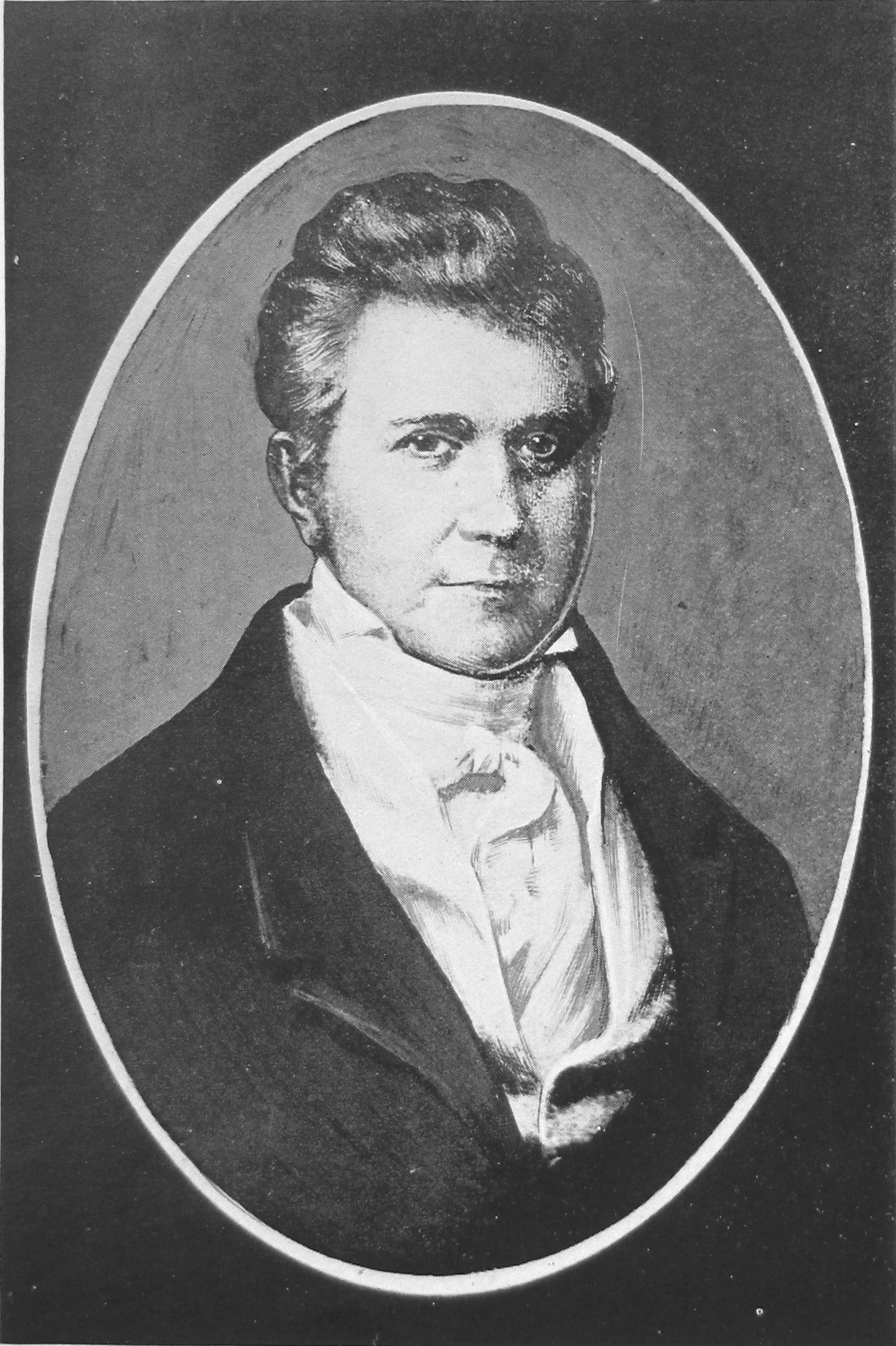
John Williams, the United States' first chargé d'affaires to Central America

The federal republic sent diplomats to Gran Colombia, France, the Holy See, Mexico, the Netherlands, the United Kingdom and the United States, and received diplomats from Chile, France, Gran Colombia, Hanover, Mexico, the Netherlands, the United Kingdom, and the United States. Mexico recognized Central American independence in August 1823. On 15 March 1825, federal diplomats signed a treaty with Gran Colombia ensuring the existence of a "perpetual confederation" ("confederación perpetua") between the countries; the treaty was ratified on 12 September. Although France, the Holy See, the Netherlands, and the United Kingdom sent diplomats to the Federal Republic of Central America, they recognized Central America's independence only after the federal government had collapsed in the late 1830s.

The United States recognized the independence of the Federal Republic of Central America from Spain on 4 August 1824 when U.S. President James Monroe received Cañas as Central America's envoy to the United States. The two countries signed the Treaty of Peace, Amity, Commerce, and Navigation on 5 December 1825. On 3 May 1826, Central America received U.S. Chargé d'Affaires John Williams in Guatemala City. William S. Murphy was the last U.S. diplomat assigned to Central America; he left his post in March 1842 after the federal republic had collapsed.

On 16 June 1825, the Federal Congress passed a law approving construction of a canal in Nicaragua to connect the Pacific Ocean and the Caribbean Sea. The congress approved a contract with the government of the Netherlands to develop the canal project in October 1830, but the Dutch government canceled the contract the following year due to the Belgian Revolution. The Nicaraguan government asked the federal government in 1833 and 1838 to build a canal, but the federal government took no action on either request.

=== National symbols ===
While resisting the Mexican attempt to annex Central America in 1822, Arce's forces waved a horizontal blue, white, and blue triband inspired by the flag of Argentina. The flag of the Federal Republic of Central America, adopted on 21 August 1823, was based on Arce's 1822 design. The adopted flag retained the blue, white, and blue horizontal triband design, with the country's coat of arms in the center. The federal republic's coat of arms was an equilateral triangle; within the triangle were a rainbow at the top, a Phrygian cap with beams of light emanating from it in the center, and five rounded volcanoes surrounded by two oceans (the Pacific and Atlantic Oceans) at the bottom. Surrounding the triangle was an oval with the name of the country within it.

The federal republic's national anthem was "La Granadera", written by Rómulo E. Durón. Its national motto – "God, Union, Liberty" ("Dios, Unión, Libertad") – was adopted on 4 August 1823, replacing the motto "God keep you many years" ("Dios guarde a Ud. muchos años") in use before independence.

== Demographics ==
=== Population ===
In 1824, Central America had a population of 1,287,491. By 1836, it had an estimated population of 1,900,000; the estimate, by federal administrator Juan Galindo, "largely over-estimated" the number of whites and excluded Honduras' indigenous population. Central America was the most densely populated country in the Americas. Its population was unevenly distributed across the states, with over half in Guatemala in 1824. The constitution granted political representation in the Federal Congress in proportion to population, so the population imbalance gave Guatemala greater representation in the legislature than the other states.

=== Ethnic composition ===
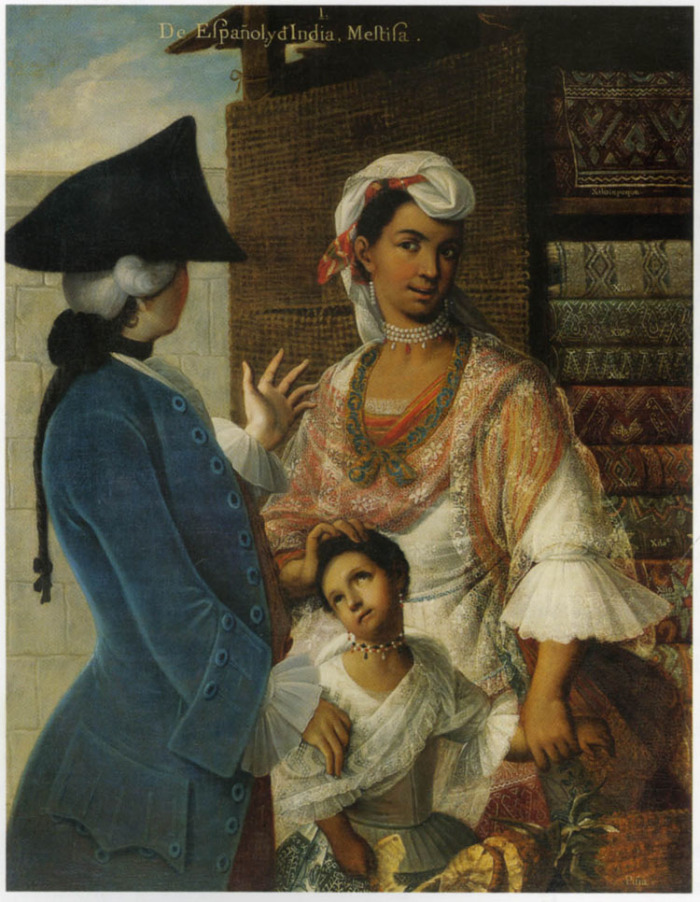
An 18th-century painting by Miguel Cabrera of a white man, an indigenous woman and a mixed-race child, the three major ethnic groups of the Federal Republic of Central America

Central America was not ethnically homogenous. In 1824, 65 percent of the population was indigenous, 31 percent was mixed (Ladino or mestizo), and four percent was white (Spanish or criollo). There was a small population of Blacks, and Galindo described the black population in 1836 as "too inconsiderable to be taken into consideration". Ethnic composition varied throughout the Central American states. In 1824, up to 70 percent of Guatemala's population was indigenous; El Salvador, Honduras, and Nicaragua were almost entirely composed of mestizos, and Costa Rica self-reported that it was 80 percent white.

Population of Central America (1836)
State	Ethnic group			
State	Indigenous	Mixed	White	Total
Costa Rica	25,000	—	125,000	150,000
El Salvador	70,000	210,000	70,000	350,000
Federal District	20,000	20,000	10,000	50,000
Guatemala	450,000	150,000	100,000	700,000
Honduras	—	240,000	60,000	300,000
Nicaragua	120,000	120,000	110,000	350,000
Total	685,000	740,000	475,000	1,900,000

Central America's white and mixed population primarily spoke Spanish, and the majority indigenous population spoke their indigenous languages. Most Central Americans in the federal republic were illiterate, and the federal and state governments lacked the funding to invest in schools. Morazán established universities in San Salvador and León in the early 1830s, although they lacked funding and professors.

=== Religion ===
Catholicism was the largest and the official religion of the Federal Republic of Central America. Initially, Catholicism was the only religion that could be practiced publicly. Public worship as part of any other religion was prohibited until May 1832, when the Federal Congress issued a decree permitting public practice of any religion (a right reinforced by an 1835 constitutional amendment). The Catholic Church influenced Central American politics, but the president and any Supreme Court justice were not allowed to be members of the clergy; only one of each state's two senators could be a clergyman. Papal bulls issued by the pope to Central America had to be approved by the Federal Congress before they became effective.

=== Cities ===
In 1836, twenty-nine settlements were designated as cities in Central America.

Location of the 29 settlements officially designated as cities in the Federal Republic of Central America (1836)

== Economy ==
=== Currency ===
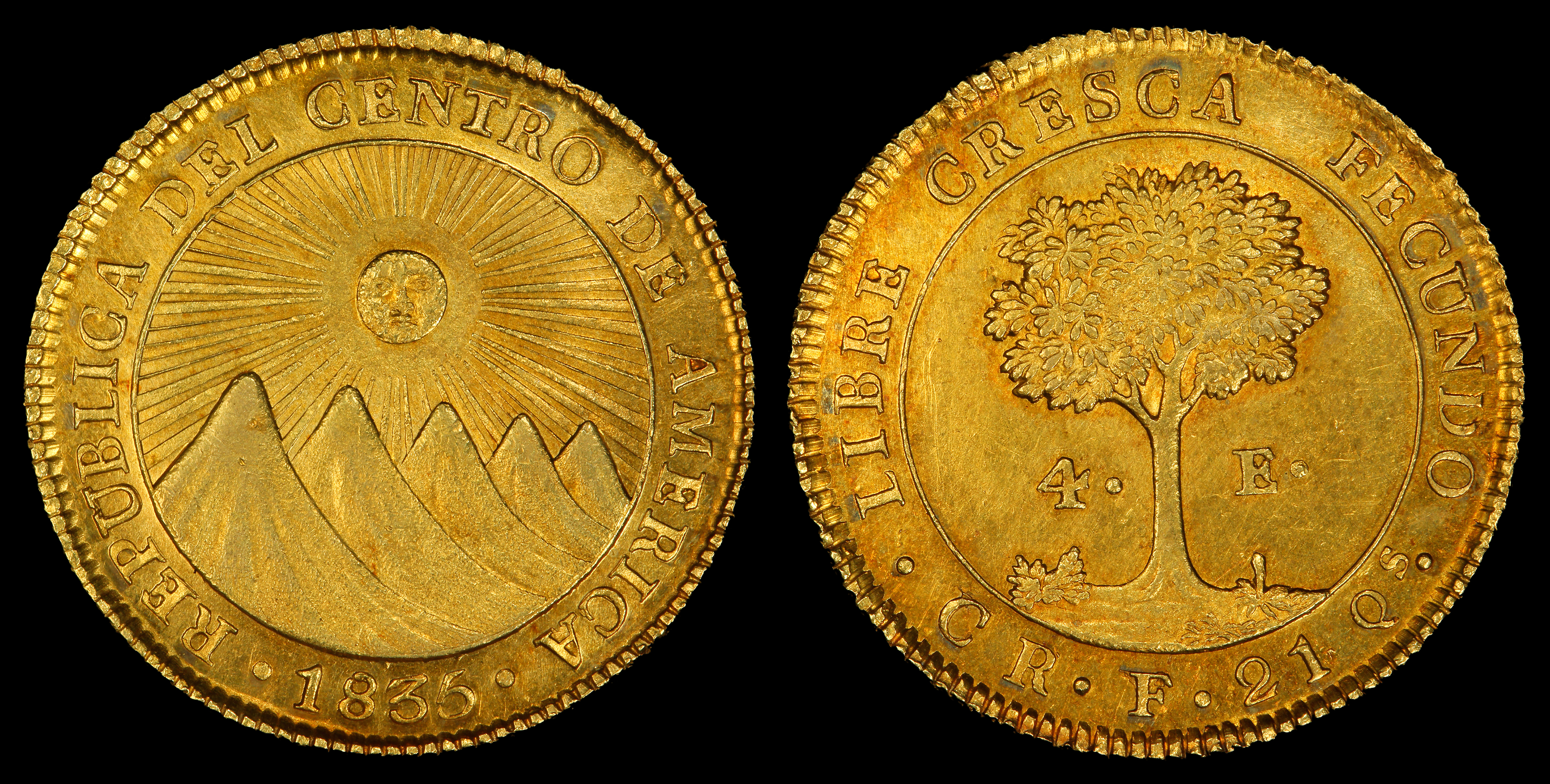
A four-escudo coin struck in 1835 at the San José mint; 697 were minted.

On 19 March 1824, the National Constituent Assembly passed a law that prohibited the minting of coins with "the bust, coat of arms, or whatever other emblems which are typical and distinctive of the Spanish monarchy" ("el busto, escudo de armas o cualesquiera otros emblemas que sean propios y distintivos de la monarquía española"). The law also ordered the creation of a new currency. The obverse would depict the country's coat of arms, and the reverse would depict a tree with the phrase "Grow Free and Fertile" ("Libre Cresca Fecundo").

The Central American currency, known as the "national currency", was divided into escudos, pesos, and reales. One escudo equaled two pesos, and one peso equaled eight reales. Escudos were struck in gold in denominations of 1/2, 1, 2, 4, and 8; pesos were struck in gold in denominations of 1 and 2; reales were struck in silver in denominations of 1/4, 1/2, 1, 2, and 8. The coins were minted in Guatemala City, San José, and Tegucigalpa.

=== Problems ===
Unfortunately, neither in the Republic nor the state [Guatemala] has there been presented a truly creative plan for the treasury. A routine spirit, pusillanimous and without coordination and system, has prevailed in establishing taxes, thus proving that we have inherited from Spain financial ineptitude.

— Mariano Gálvez, treasurer of Guatemala, 1829

Thomas L. Karnes, a history professor at Arizona State University, described the Federal Republic of Central America's economy as "chaotic". The federal republic constantly struggled to have enough money to finance its governmental obligations. In 1826, Williams wrote to United States Secretary of State Henry Clay that Central America's economic situation was "most unpromising". Robert S. Smith, an economics professor at Duke University, described the federal treasury as "chronically empty". When Arce assumed the presidency in 1825, the treasury contained only 600 pesos.

Under Spanish colonial rule, Central America's economy was reliant on agriculture because the region lacked abundant natural resources; the Federal Republic of Central America continued to rely on an agricultural economy. The federal republic's largest source of income was the export of lumber products, indigo, cochineal, bananas, coffee, cacao, and (especially) tobacco; tobacco exports generated 200,000 to 300,000 pesos of income annually. Although agricultural exports provided the federal republic with much of its income, it was still reliant on foreign loans to finance everyday governance. Many of these foreign loans were granted at greatly discounted rates, but still fell into default. The federal government defaulted on its foreign debt, which totaled GB£163,300 (equivalent to US$15,351,507 in 2025), in 1828. In October 1823, the National Constituent Assembly had pledged to pay off the country's internal debt (a total of 3,583,576 pesos); by February 1831, however, the debt had increased to 4,768,966 pesos.

Infrastructure between and within the federal republic's states was poor due to Central America's large areas of dense forest and mountainous terrain. Indigenous slaves had built and maintained Central America's road network, but construction and maintenance of the roads nearly ended when slavery was abolished on 17 April 1824 by federal decree. Degradation of the country's infrastructure reduced interstate commerce and industry. Outbreaks of leprosy, smallpox, and typhoid fever also hindered labor productivity.

Guatemala's economy was the strongest of the five states, financing most of the federal government's civil and military expenses; some states contributed to the federal government only intermittently due to strained economic conditions. Guatemala was responsible for paying almost half of the federal republic's foreign debt until the 1828 default.

== Legacy ==
=== Historical assessment ===
The states of the Isthmus from Panama to Guatemala will perhaps form a confederation. This magnificent location between the two great oceans could in time become the emporium of the world. Its canals will shorten the distances throughout the world, strengthen commercial ties with Europe, America, and Asia, and bring that happy region tribute from the four quarters of the globe. Perhaps some day the capital of the world may be located there, just as Constantine claimed Byzantium was the capital of the ancient world.

— Simón Bolívar about the potential of an independent Central American nation in Jamaica Letter (1815)

Richard A. Haggerty, an editor for the Federal Research Division of the Library of Congress, described the Federal Republic of Central America as "unworkable" but the "only successful political union of the Central American states" after the end of Spanish colonial rule. El Salvador's Ministry of Education described the federal republic as a "political laboratory" ("laboratorio político") for ideas such as republicanism and constitutionalism.

Some experts criticized the federal constitution as "too idealistic", as a major component of the federal republic's collapse. Liberal Guatemalan politician Lorenzo Montúfar said that in "adopting the federal system, [the federal republic] obtained for result, wars, and disasters". Nicaraguan journalist Pedro Joaquín Chamorro wrote that attempting to emulate the United States' federalism created divisions between Central America's states where a centralized government would have succeeded. According to El Salvador's Ministry of Education, the federal constitution was a "fatal conclusion that led to anarchy and disorganization" ("conclusión fatal que llevó la anarquía y la desorganización"). University of Massachusetts research scholar Lynn V. Foster described the federal republic during the 1820s as "more like a loose confederation of small independent nations than a single republic" due to the great amount of power and influence wielded by local officials in their states compared to the federal government. Guillermo Vázquez Vicente, an economics professor at King Juan Carlos University, wrote that achieving the constitution's ideals for the federal republic was "impossible" ("imposible") without a coherent political, economic, and social plan. He cited the failure to reach the constitution's republican ideals and separatist sentiment in the five states as an "insurmountable impediment" ("impedimento insalvable") to achieving national unity.

Other experts disagree that the constitution, or federalism, were the primary cause of the Federal Republic of Central America's collapse. Franklin D. Parker, a history professor at the University of North Carolina at Greensboro, said that the federal republic's political leaders' failure to abide by and enforce the constitution's provisions ultimately resulted in its collapse. Liberal Central American historian Alejandro Marure attributed "all of the misfortunes which the nation suffered" to Arce's attempts to appease both liberals and conservatives during the 1820s. Honduran lawyer and politician Ramón Rosa wrote in his biography of Valle that Morazán's 1835 re-election brought "the ruin of the Central American Republic" ("la ruina de la República centroamericana"), saying that Morazán's use of military force to settle disputes instead of compromising undermined the federal government. Nicaraguan writer Salvador Mendieta said that a primary cause of the federal republic's collapse was a lack of efficient communication infrastructure between and within the states. Philip F. Flemion, a history professor at San Diego State University, attributed the collapse of the federal republic to "regional jealousies, social and cultural differences, inadequate communication and transportation systems, limited financial resources, and disparate political views". Smith noted the federal republic's "financial maladministration" and "abortive economic development" as playing at least a small role in its collapse.

=== Reunification attempts ===
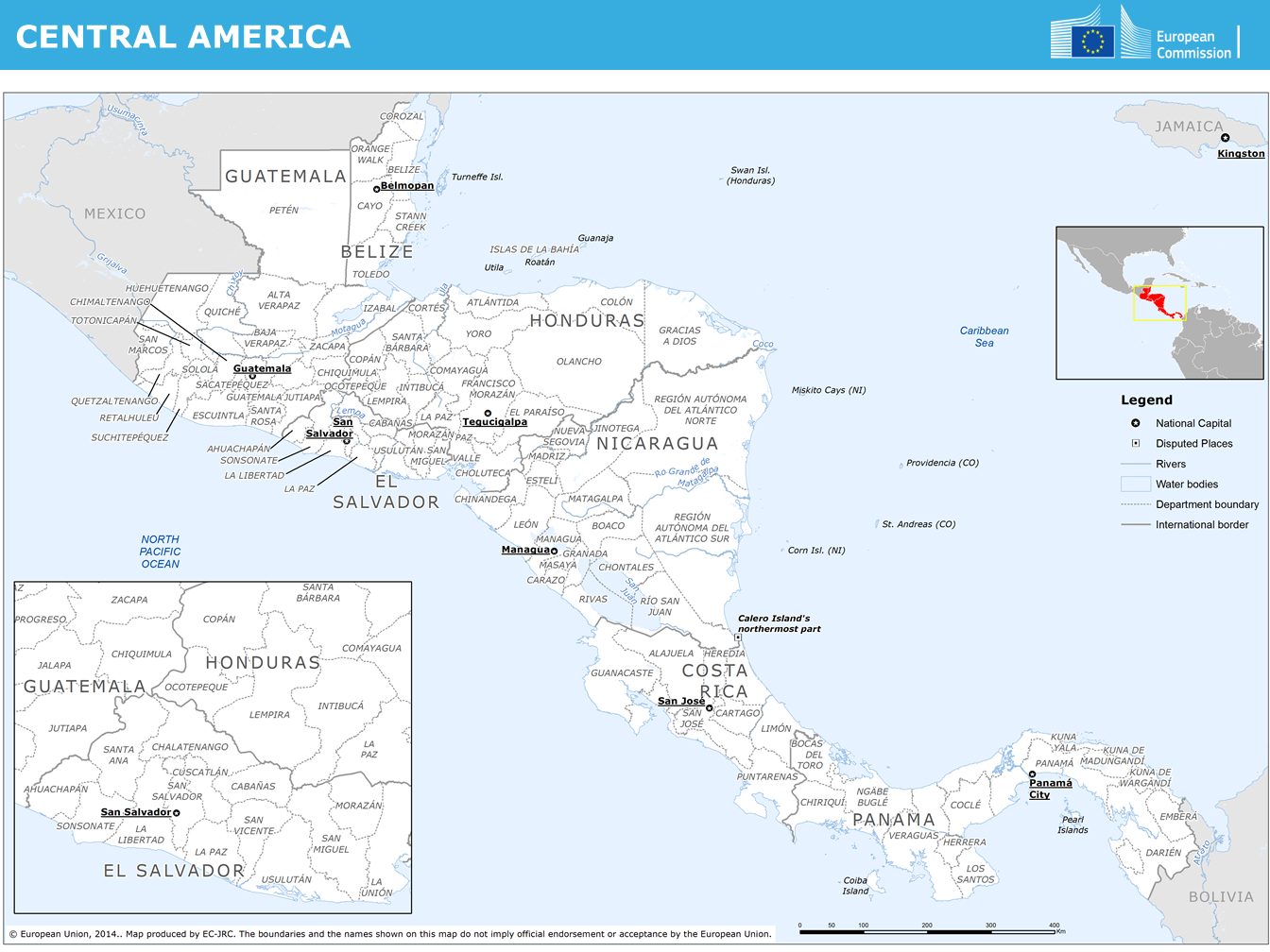
A map by the European Commission with Central America's modern borders

As early as 1842, some Central Americans sought to reunite the region. Several attempts have been made at reunification by diplomacy or force during the 19th and 20th centuries, but none lasted longer than a few months or involved all five former members of the Federal Republic of Central America. According to Guatemalan historian Julio César Pinto Soria, Central America has failed to achieve reunification primarily due to the power of oligarchs in the federal republic's former states who see reunification as an impediment to their goals.

Delegations from El Salvador, Honduras, and Nicaragua proclaimed Antonio José Cañas the president of a new federal government on 17 March 1842, but the governments of Costa Rica and Guatemala did not recognize the proclamation. Cañas' government ended in 1844, when El Salvador and Honduras invaded Nicaragua for granting asylum to Salvadoran and Honduran political exiles. Francisco Morazán also tried to reunite Central America by force in 1842 when he became the political leader of Costa Rica. After leading an invasion of Nicaragua, he was defeated, deposed, and executed by firing squad on 15 September of that year.

In 1848, delegates from El Salvador, Honduras, and Nicaragua met in Tegucigalpa to draft a new constitution for Central America. Further meetings were held the following year in León, during which the delegations signed a treaty to elect a Central American president, vice president, and national legislature. The Central American legislature declared the establishment of a Central American union on 9 October 1852, but resistance from the Nicaraguan Legitimist Party and the outbreak of civil war in Nicaragua led to the union's failure by 1854. Neither El Salvador nor Nicaragua ratified the union's constitution.

In 1876, Guatemalan president Justo Rufino Barrios called for all five former members of the Federal Republic of Central America to send delegations to Guatemala City to negotiate the restoration of a united Central American country, but Barrios' invasion of El Salvador later that year ended the planned negotiations. On 28 February 1885, Barrios declared the establishment of the Central America Federation and proclaimed himself as its president. Honduras accepted Barrios' declaration, but Costa Rica, El Salvador, and Nicaragua rejected it. Barrios invaded El Salvador on 29 March 1885 to force it to join the Central American Union, and was killed during the Battle of Chalchuapa on 2 April. Guatemalan forces withdrew from El Salvador, ending Barrios' attempt to reunite Central America.

On 20 June 1895, delegations from El Salvador, Honduras, and Nicaragua signed the Treaty of Amapala and declared the formation of the Greater Republic of Central America. The treaty allowed Costa Rica and Guatemala to join if their governments wished to do so. The United States established diplomatic relations with the republic in December 1896. The first session of the Executive Federal Council (the country's legislature) was held on 1 November 1898, when the country's constitution was adopted and its name was changed to the United States of Central America. On 13 November, Salvadoran General Tomás Regalado Romero overthrew President Rafael Antonio Gutiérrez and declared El Salvador's withdrawal from the United States of Central America. On 29 November, the Executive Federal Council dissolved the union after failing to stop El Salvador's secession. The most recent attempt to reunite Central America was the short-lived Federation of Central America of 1921 to 1922 that collapsed after Guatemalan president Carlos Herrera was overthrown.

Salvadoran president Nayib Bukele has expressed a desire to reunite Central America. In some speeches since assuming office in 2019, he said that Central America should be "one single nation". Bukele reaffirmed his belief in 2024 that Central America should reunite, saying that the region would be stronger if united but he needed "the will of the peoples" ("la voluntad de los pueblos") to achieve reunification.

== See also ==
- History of Central America
