= Tomás O'Horan =

Mexican politician

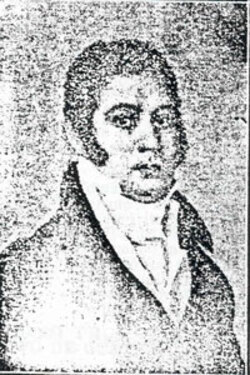
Tomás Antonio O'Horán y Argüello (1775–1848)

Tomás Antonio O'Horán y Argüello (1775–1848) was a Mexican lawyer, magistrate and senator, resident most of his life in Mérida, Yucatán in Mexico.

Tomas was born somewhere in the Yucatán region, the son of John O'Horan, a native of County Cork, Ireland, and María Gertrudis de Argüello y Monte, of Campeche. John had come to the Yucatán region by way of the Canary Islands.

Tomas was educated at the Seminario Conciliar of Campeche from about 1794 to 1799 and subsequently was a professor of law there. He served from October 1823 to April 1825 as a member of the Second Triumvirate (ruling council) of the United Provinces of Central America, serving as Chairman every third month. He served in the Mexican Senate representing Yucatán in 1835. Subsequently, he was also a magistrate in Mérida.

Tomas married Gertrudis Escudero de la Rocha with whom he had several children.

One of his sons, Tomás O'Horán y Escudero (1819–1867) became a general in the Mexican armed forces who fought against the French invasion in 1862, and was appointed Governor and Military Commander of the State of Mexico by Benito Juárez, but later served as Prefect of the Valley of Mexico under the French, and was shot by the forces of Benito Juárez in 1867 after they re-took Mexico City.

Another son, Agustín Jorge O'Horán Escudero (1828–1884) was a medical doctor for whom the oldest hospital in Mérida is named.
