= Pedro Molina Mazariegos =

Mexican politician

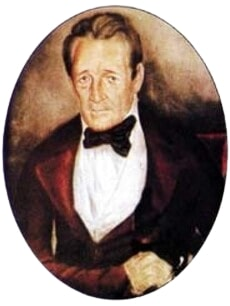
Pedro Molina

Pedro José Antonio Molina Mazariegos (April 29, 1777, Guatemala — September 21, 1854) was a Central American politician, considered one of the founders of liberalism in Guatemala.

== Career ==
At the head of a party named Los Cacos (The Thieves), he fought for the independence of Central America from Spain. Los Cacos were opposed by Los Serviles (The Slaves).

In 1802 he was a professor at the Universidad de San Carlos de Guatemala. He married María Dolores Bedoya in 1804. In 1820 he formulated a plan for the reform of medical education. His plan was accepted and put into practice.

He was a physician and a journalist. He founded El Editor Constitucional (later known as El Genio de la Libertad) on July 24, 1820. On March 10, 1848 he founded El Album Republicano. Because of his vocal opposition to the government, he was held for a time incommunicado in the Castle of San José.

From July 10, 1823 to October 4, 1823 he served on the first executive triumvirate of the newly independent Federal Republic of Central America, and was the triumvirate's first president. Later, he was president of the states of Guatemala (August 23, 1829 to February 10, 1831) and Los Altos (December 28, 1838 to January 27, 1840) within the federation.

Preceded by Juan Barrundia	Chief of State of Guatemala; 1829–1831	Succeeded by Gregorio Márquez
Preceded by Governing Junta	Chief of State of Los Altos; 1838–1840	Succeeded by Governing Junta
