= José Cecilio del Valle =

Honduran philosopher and politician

Jose Cecilio del Valle
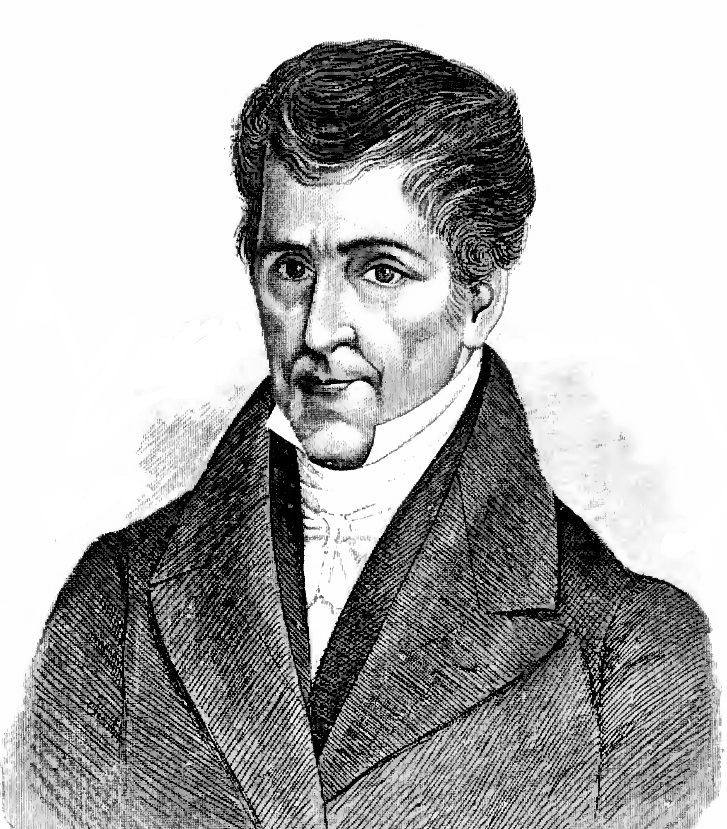

President-elect of the Federal Republic of Central America (Died before taking office)
- Preceded by: Francisco Morazán
- Succeeded by: José Gregorio Salazar

Foreign Minister of Mexico
- In office February 22, 1823 – April 2, 1823
- Monarch: Agustín de Iturbide
- Preceded by: Jose Manuel de Herrera
- Succeeded by: Lucas Alamán

Mayor of Guatemala City
- In office January 1, 1821 – June 1821
- Preceded by: None
- Succeeded by: Pedro Molina Mazariegos

Personal details
- Born: 22 November 1780 Choluteca, Honduras
- Died: March 2, 1834 (aged 53)
- Party: Conservative
- Spouse: Josefa Valero
- Education: San Carlos University, Guatemala
- Profession: Diplomat; Lawyer
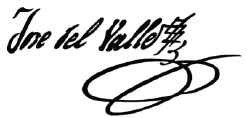
- Signature

José Cecilio Díaz del Valle (22 November 1780 – 2 March 1834) was a philosopher, politician, lawyer, and journalist and one of the most important figures in Central America during the transition from colonial government to independence, displaying a wide-ranging expertise in public administration management.

Valle was nicknamed 'The Wise'. He was a moderate.

== Personal life ==
=== Early years ===
José Cecilio del Valle was born on November 22, 1780, in the village of Choluteca, located near the Choluteca River. This village belonged to the former province of Tegucigalpa (now Honduras), during the Spanish domination. He was the legitimate son of Jose Antonio del Valle and Gertrudis Díaz del Valle. Both members of the most distinguished Spanish families of the Kingdom of Guatemala, who, therefore, had obtained the main political and military jobs. Their wealth consisted mainly of valuable estates of livestock. But that wasn't enough to provide their favorite son with a good education. Tegucigalpa lacked good schools, the only ones available were supported by private donations. Given this situation, Jose Antonio del Valle had to move his family to Guatemala City, where he hoped young Jose would be better formed. Jose Cecilio was only 9 years old when he arrived to Guatemala.

== Education ==
In Guatemala City he attended the University of San Carlos where he earned a bachelor's degree in 1794. Then in 1799 he earned a degree in civil and canonical law and a licentiate degree in law in 1803. His mentor was Father José Antonio Liendo y Goycochea.

== Politics ==
In 1821 he was elected mayor of Guatemala City, position he held until June (1821). The same year Central America became independent from Spanish rule. Jose del Valle was the one who wrote the Act of Independence of Central America. Up to this date, there is a controversy in relation to this document because del Valle did not sign it. Most historians however, agreed that he was not supposed to sign such document. In 1822 Central America became part of the short lived Mexican Empire under Agustín de Iturbide.

Valle was elected a 'Guatemalan Representative' before the Mexican Congress. On August 27, 1822, Valle was imprisoned along with other representatives on charges of conspiring against the Mexicans. After months in prison (February 1823), he was released and appointed Foreign Minister for the Mexican Government. The same year Central America gained its independence from Mexico. In January 1824 he returned to Guatemala where he was part of the second triumvirate that governed the Provinces of Central America.

In 1825 José del Valle ran for president of the Federal Republic of Central America against Manuel José Arce. Apparently he won the election obtaining more votes. But Congress had a different interpretation. The candidates went to second round and Arce was declared winner. Following his defeat, Valle retired from politics and devoted himself to writing.

In 1830 President Francisco Morazán offered him to be ambassador to France, and or the Vice presidency. He declined both and instead went on to become Director of the Economic Society and Director of San Carlos University's Fine Arts department.

== Correspondence ==
Jeremy Bentham and Valle corresponded. Before his death, Bentham sent a lock of his hair to Valle.

== Death ==
In 1834 he defeated incumbent Francisco Morazán in the general election but never took over the presidency. He died on the road that leads from the farm "La Concepción" to Guatemala City, on March 2, 1834, where he was supposed to be treated for an illness. The government decreed three days of mourning after his death. His death was marked by national mourning and bells tolling throughout the Republic, as he was one of the few prominent figures respected by Liberals and Conservatives alike.

== Legacy ==
The Honduran Government awards a medal for distinguished service named "Orden Civil José Cecilio del Valle", and there is a University named after him in Tegucigalpa.

November 22 is a holiday because of his Birthday.

José Cecilio Del Valle is featured on the Honduran 100 Lempira banknote since 1951.

A later family member of Jose Cecilo was Jorge Del Valle Zamora and was ambassador of Honduras to Mexico in the 20th century.

== See also ==
- History of Central America

Preceded by (none)	President of Central America; 1823–1825	Succeeded by Manuel José Arce
