= Liberalism and conservatism in Latin America =

Liberalism and conservatism in Latin America have unique historical roots as Latin American independence began to occur in 1808 after the French Revolution and the subsequent Napoleonic Wars that eventually engulfed all of Europe. French revolutionaries in the 1790s began an intellectual awakening called the Enlightenment, which opened the door for ideas of positivism in Latin American society and people in Latin America turned to liberal ideologies as liberalism means the idea of liberty, equality and popular sovereignty.

During the early 19th century in Latin America, liberalism clashed with conservative views as liberals wanted to end the dominance of the Catholic Church, class stratification and slavery. These issues for many years strongly affected the way that Latin American society was organized. The majority of liberals believed in a democratic system of government, but this system would create many changes and much confusion in Latin American communities in the early 19th century. On the other hand, conservatism favored existing systems and hierarchies. Conservatives believed chaos and social disorder would break out if the political system were liberalized. Latin American conservatives generally believed in class stratification and opposed radical change in government in Latin America.

Simón Bolívar, a key leader in the early independence movements in the 19th century, pushed for a centralized government that spanned the entire Northern Andes and a united Latin America. Military and political leaders opposed him strongly, and accused him of seeking dictatorship. This fear of central power came from the regional divisions in Latin American politics. The contest between liberals and conservatives in Latin America, while sweeping in effect, was largely fought between members of the landed, white or creole elite. Creoles were the children of immigrated European families. Systems in place from the colonial period—such as slavery, patronage by the elite and debt peonage—meant that the great mass of Indians, Africans and people of mixed race had little, if any power compared to the very small creole ruling class. Although Indians, Africans, and people of mixed race had little power compared to that of the Creoles and white elites, they were still victims of conflict and violence caused by the conflicting ideologies of liberalism and conservativism. These individuals would often find themselves more vulnerable to labor extractions, liberal reformism, and mercantile violence than creole elites. Thus the concern that liberalization would lead to "disorder" that the conservatives spoke about is considered by some historians as a veiled or transparent fear of race war.

Caudillos soon came to power in some Latin American societies, such as Mexico. Caudillos were people of either progressive or conservative thought, who promised protection and restoration of traditional ways to the people. They were generally pragmatic, believing in a ruling system of what works best. Caudillos used military force to hold society together. One of the most prominent figures was General Antonio López de Santa Anna, a conservative caudillo in Mexico who represented the unstable politics of early post-independence in Latin America. Santa Anna went back and forth between holding power and being exiled, serving as president of Mexico eleven times and playing key roles in both military successes, such as defeating a French invasion in 1838, and losses, including the loss of Texas in 1836. In contrast, figures like the Argentine liberal Domingo Faustino Sarmiento strongly criticized the caudillo system, arguing that the dominance of military leaders in Argentina created a threat to democracy. Since the 1980s, there have been several neo-liberal economic reforms across Latin America, in order to support expansive industrialization.

In most countries the old parties had been replaced by populist or leftist parties. Only in Colombia (Liberal Party and Conservative Party), Honduras (Liberal Party and conservative National Party), Paraguay (liberal PLRA and conservative Colorado Party), and Uruguay (liberal Colorado Party and the conservative National Party) do the two historical parties remain influential. Argentina still has the liberal Radical Civic Union, Nicaragua has three liberal parties: the PLC, the ALN and the PLI which trace back to the old Democratic Party and in the Dominican Republic, the conservative Social Christian Reformist Party claims to be the successor of the historic Red Party.
