= List of members of the XII Legislative Assembly of El Salvador =

Former members of the Salvadoran legislature

XII Legislative Assembly
←	XI	XIII	→
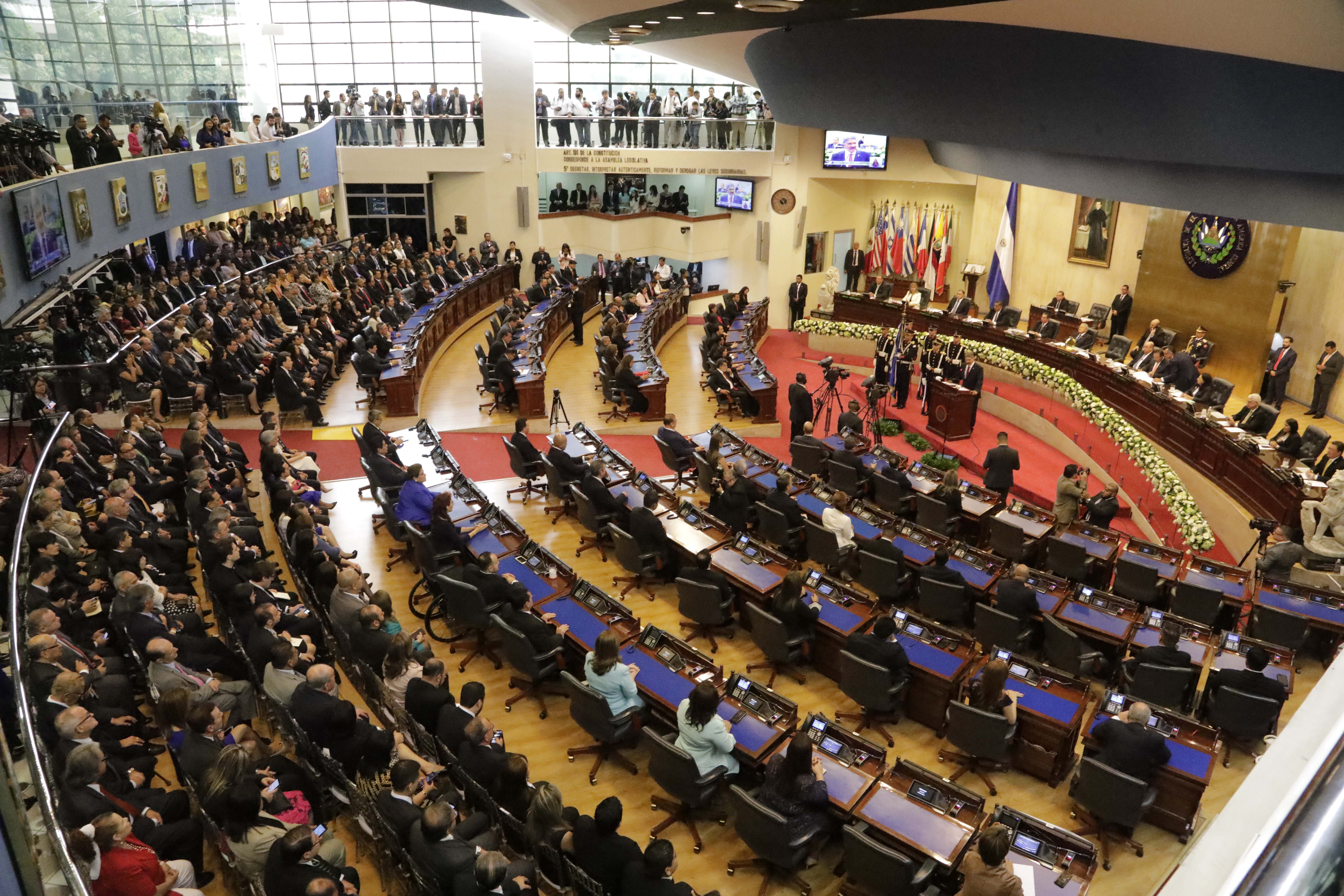
- The XII Legislative Assembly in session

Overview
- Legislative body: Legislative Assembly
- Meeting place: Blue Room
- Term: 1 May 2018 – 1 May 2021
- Election: 4 March 2018
- Government: ARENA (37); GANA (10); PCN (9)
- Opposition: FMLN (23); PDC (3); CD (1); Ind. (1)

Legislative Assembly
- Members: 84
- President: Norman Quijano (2018–2019); Mario Ponce (2019–2021)

The following is a list of all eighty-four (84) members of the XII Legislative Assembly of El Salvador (2018–2021). The session began on 1 May 2018 and ended on 1 May 2021.

== Composition by department ==
The following table displays the final composition of the XII Legislative Assembly.

Department	Seats	Number of deputies by party						
Department	Seats	ARENA	FMLN	GANA	PCN	PDC	CD	Ind.
Ahuachapán	4	2	1	—N/a	1	—N/a	—N/a	—N/a
Cabañas	3	1	1	—N/a	1	—N/a	—N/a	—N/a
Chalatenango	3	1	1	—N/a	1	—N/a	—N/a	—N/a
Cuscatlán	3	1	1	—N/a	1	—N/a	—N/a	—N/a
La Libertad	10	5	3	1	1	—N/a	—N/a	—N/a
La Paz	4	2	1	1	—N/a	—N/a	—N/a	—N/a
La Unión	3	2	1	—N/a	—N/a	—N/a	—N/a	—N/a
Morazán	3	1	1	1	—N/a	—N/a	—N/a	—N/a
San Miguel	6	2	2	1	—N/a	1	—N/a	—N/a
San Salvador	24	12	6	2	1	1	1	1
San Vicente	3	1	1	—N/a	1	—N/a	—N/a	—N/a
Santa Ana	7	3	1	1	1	1	—N/a	—N/a
Sonsonate	6	2	2	1	1	—N/a	—N/a	1
Usulután	5	2	2	1	—N/a	—N/a	—N/a	—N/a
Total	84	37	23	10	9	3	1	1

== List of deputies ==
Composition of the XIII Legislative Assembly by department on 1 May 2018

Department	Deputy	Political affiliation
Ahuachapán	Ricardo Ernesto Godoy Peñate	Nationalist Republican Alliance
Ahuachapán	Norma Guisela Herrera de Portillo	Farabundo Martí National Liberation Front
Ahuachapán	José Serafín Orantes Rodríguez	National Coalition Party
Ahuachapán	Arturo Simeón Magaña Azmitia	Nationalist Republican Alliance
Cabañas	Carlos Armando Reyes Ramos	Nationalist Republican Alliance
Cabañas	Lorenzo Rivas Echeverría	Grand Alliance for National Unity
Cabañas	José Luis Urías	National Coalition Party
Chalatenango	Audelia Guadalupe López Vásquez	Farabundo Martí National Liberation Front
Chalatenango	Reynaldo Antonio López Cardoza	National Coalition Party
Chalatenango	Julio César Fabián Pérez	Nationalist Republican Alliance
Cuscatlán	Mario Antonio Ponce López	National Coalition Party
Cuscatlán	Milton Ricardo Ramírez Garay	Farabundo Martí National Liberation Front
Cuscatlán	Alberto Armando Romero Rodríguez	Nationalist Republican Alliance
La Libertad	Rina Idalia Araujo de Martínez	Farabundo Martí National Liberation Front
La Libertad	Rodrigo Ávila Avilés	Nationalist Republican Alliance
La Libertad	Raúl Beltrán	National Coalition Party
La Libertad	Norma Cristina Cornejo Amaya	Farabundo Martí National Liberation Front
La Libertad	Felissa Guadalupe Cristales Miranda	Nationalist Republican Alliance
La Libertad	Karla Elena Hernández Molina	Nationalist Republican Alliance
La Libertad	René Gustavo Escalante Zelaya	Nationalist Republican Alliance
La Libertad	José Manuel de Jesús Flores Cornejo	Farabundo Martí National Liberation Front
La Libertad	Ricardo Andrés Velásquez Parker	Nationalist Republican Alliance
La Libertad	Francisco José Zablah Safie	Grand Alliance for National Unity
La Paz	Rosa Alma Cruz Marinero	Farabundo Martí National Liberation Front
La Paz	Bonner Francisco Jiménez Belloso	Nationalist Republican Alliance
La Paz	Rosa María Romero	Nationalist Republican Alliance
La Paz	Mario Alberto Tenorio Guerrero	Grand Alliance for National Unity
La Unión	Jorge Luis Rosales Ríos	Nationalist Republican Alliance
La Unión	Mario Andrés Martínez	Nationalist Republican Alliance
La Unión	David Ernesto Reyes Molina	Farabundo Martí National Liberation Front
Morazán	Mariano Dagoberto Blanco Rodríguez	Nationalist Republican Alliance
Morazán	Catalino Antonio Castillo Argueta	Farabundo Martí National Liberation Front
Morazán	Guadalupe Antonio Vásquez Martínez	Grand Alliance for National Unity
San Miguel	Lucía del Carmen Ayala de León	Nationalist Republican Alliance
San Miguel	Reinaldo Alcides Carballo Carballo	Christian Democratic Party
San Miguel	José Edgar Escolán Batarsé	Nationalist Republican Alliance
San Miguel	Dina Yamileth Argueta Avelar	Farabundo Martí National Liberation Front
San Miguel	Rodolfo Antonio Martínez	Farabundo Martí National Liberation Front
San Miguel	Numan Pompilio Salgado García	Grand Alliance for National Unity
San Salvador	Damián Alegría	Farabundo Martí National Liberation Front
San Salvador	Marta Evelyn Batres Araujo	Nationalist Republican Alliance
San Salvador	Yolanda Anabel Belloso de Carranza	Farabundo Martí National Liberation Front
San Salvador	Roberto Leonardo Bonilla Aguilar	Independent
San Salvador	Silvia Alejandrina Castro Figueroa	Nationalist Republican Alliance
San Salvador	Tomás Emilio Corea Fuentes	Nationalist Republican Alliance
San Salvador	Nidia Díaz	Farabundo Martí National Liberation Front
San Salvador	Ana María Margarita Escobar López	Nationalist Republican Alliance
San Salvador	Guillermo Antonio Gallegos Navarrete	Grand Alliance for National Unity
San Salvador	Carlos Alberto García Ruiz	Farabundo Martí National Liberation Front
San Salvador	José Andrés Hernández Ventura	Nationalist Republican Alliance
San Salvador	Juan José Martel	Democratic Change
San Salvador	Carmen Milena Mayorga Valera	Nationalist Republican Alliance
San Salvador	Osiris Luna Meza	Grand Alliance for National Unity
San Salvador	Rodolfo Antonio Parker Soto	Christian Democratic Party
San Salvador	René Alfredo Portillo Cuadra	Nationalist Republican Alliance
San Salvador	Norman Noel Quijano González	Nationalist Republican Alliance
San Salvador	David Ernesto Reyes Molina	Nationalist Republican Alliance
San Salvador	Eeileen Auxiliadora Romero Valle	National Coalition Party
San Salvador	Karina Ivette Sosa de Rodas	Farabundo Martí National Liberation Front
San Salvador	Yanci Guadalupe Urbina González	Farabundo Martí National Liberation Front
San Salvador	Mauricio Ernesto Vargas Valdez	Nationalist Republican Alliance
San Salvador	Patricia Elena Valdivieso de Gallardo	Nationalist Republican Alliance
San Salvador	Marcela Guadalupe Villatoro Alvarado	Nationalist Republican Alliance
San Vicente	Luis Roberto Angulo Samayoa	National Coalition Party
San Vicente	María Elizabeth Gómez Perla	Farabundo Martí National Liberation Front
San Vicente	Donato Eugenio Vaquerano Rivas	Nationalist Republican Alliance
Santa Ana	Jorge Adalberto Josué Godoy Cardoza	Nationalist Republican Alliance
Santa Ana	Hortensia Margarita López Quintana	Farabundo Martí National Liberation Front
Santa Ana	Mario Marroquín Mejía	Nationalist Republican Alliance
Santa Ana	Juan Carlos Mendoza Portillo	Grand Alliance for National Unity
Santa Ana	José Francisco Merino López	National Coalition Party
Santa Ana	Jorge Uriel Mazariego Mazariego	Christian Democratic Party
Santa Ana	José Javier Palomo Nieto	Nationalist Republican Alliance
Sonsonate	José Antonio Almendáriz Rivas	National Coalition Party
Sonsonate	Mayteé Gabriela Iraheta Escalante	Nationalist Republican Alliance
Sonsonate	Silvia Estela Ostorga de Escobar	Nationalist Republican Alliance
Sonsonate	Santos Adelmo Rivas Rivas	Grand Alliance for National Unity
Sonsonate	Jaime Orlando Sandoval Leiva	Farabundo Martí National Liberation Front
Sonsonate	Javier Antonio Valdez Castillo	Farabundo Martí National Liberation Front
Usulután	Ana Lucía Baires de Martínez	Farabundo Martí National Liberation Front
Usulután	Manuel Orlando Cabrera Candray	Nationalist Republican Alliance
Usulután	Mauricio Roberto Linares Ramírez	Nationalist Republican Alliance
Usulután	Jorge Schafik Handal Vega Silva	Farabundo Martí National Liberation Front
Usulután	Manuel Rigoberto Soto Lazo	Grand Alliance for National Unity

== Bibliography ==
- "Grupos Parlamentarios" [Parliamentary Groups]. Legislative Assembly of El Salvador (in Spanish). Archived from the original on 26 March 2019.
