= List of members of the XIII Legislative Assembly of El Salvador =

Members of the Salvadoran legislature

XIII Legislative Assembly
←	XII	XIV	→
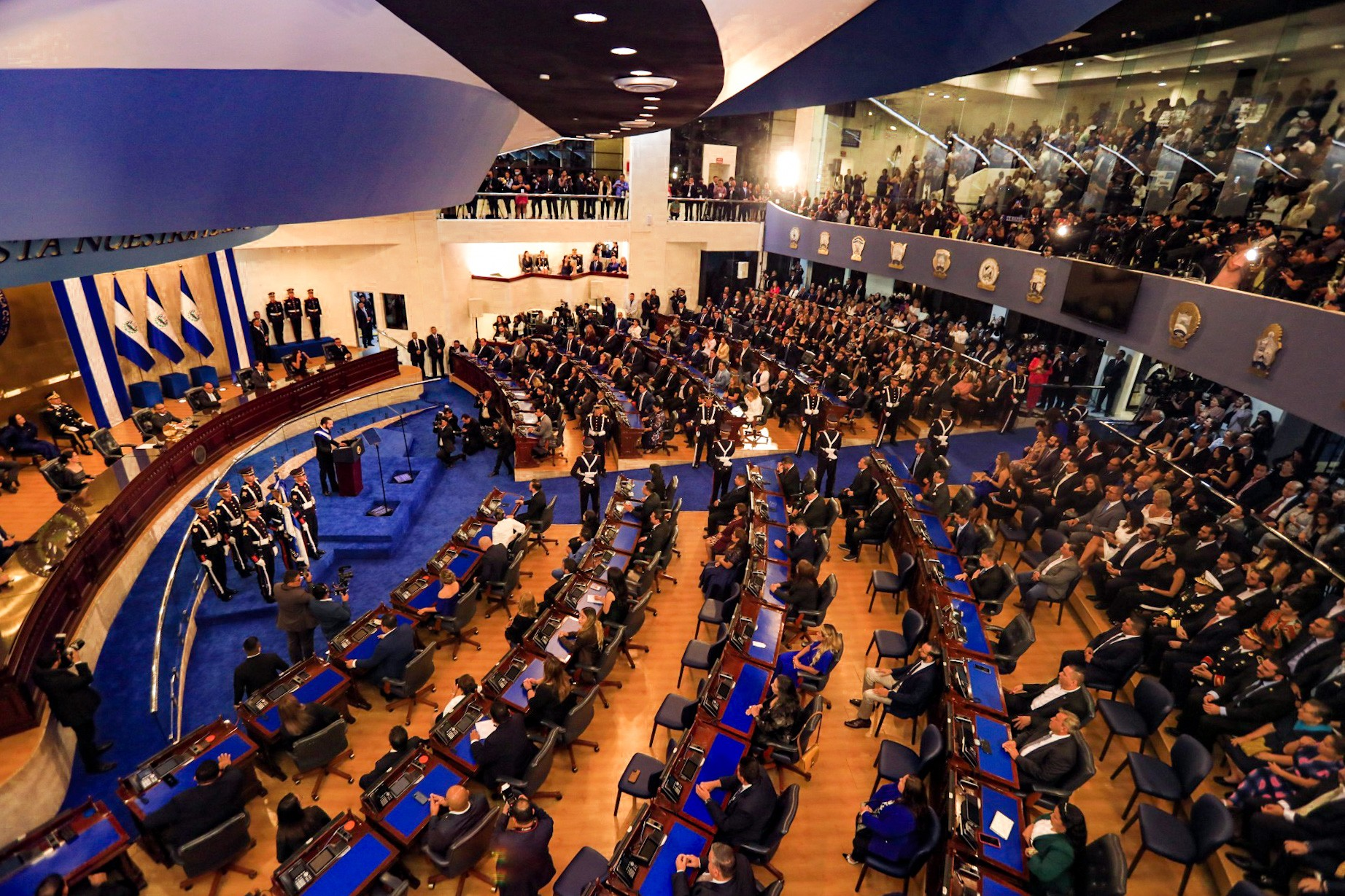
- The XIII Legislative Assembly in session

Overview
- Legislative body: Legislative Assembly
- Meeting place: Blue Room
- Term: 1 May 2021 – 1 May 2024
- Election: 28 February 2021
- Government: NI (56); GANA (3); PCN (2); PDC (1); Ind. (5)
- Opposition: ARENA (11); FMLN (4); NT (1); V (1)

Legislative Assembly
- Members: 84
- President: Ernesto Castro (NI)

The following is a list of all eighty-four (84) members of the XIII Legislative Assembly of El Salvador (2021–2024). The session began on 1 May 2021 and will end on 1 May 2024.

== Leadership ==
The following table displays the Legislative Assembly's leadership, which was elected on 1 May 2021.

Office	Holder	Political affiliation	Department	Term
President	Ernesto Castro	Nuevas Ideas	San Salvador	2021–2024
First Vice President	Suecy Callejas	Nuevas Ideas	San Salvador	2021–2024
Second Vice President	Rodrigo Ayala	Nuevas Ideas	San Salvador	2021–2024
Third Vice President	Guillermo Gallegos	Grand Alliance for National Unity	San Salvador	2021–2024
First Secretary	Elisa Rosales	Nuevas Ideas	San Salvador	2021–2024
Second Secretary	Numan Salgado	Grand Alliance for National Unity	San Miguel	2021–2024
Third Secretary	Serafín Orantes	National Coalition Party	Ahuachapán	2021–2022
Third Secretary	Reynaldo Cardoza	National Coalition Party	Chalatenango	2022–2024
Fourth Secretary	Reinaldo Carballo	Christian Democratic Party	San Miguel	2021–2024

== Composition by department ==
The following table displays the current composition of the XIII Legislative Assembly.

Department	Seats	Number of deputies by party								
Department	Seats	NI	ARENA	FMLN	GANA	PCN	PDC	NT	V	Ind.
Ahuachapán	4	2	1	—N/a	—N/a	1	—N/a	—N/a	—N/a	—N/a
Cabañas	3	2	—N/a	—N/a	—N/a	—N/a	—N/a	—N/a	—N/a	1 (Note: Originally elected as a member of ARENA, but later left the party to become an independent.)
Chalatenango	3	2	—N/a	—N/a	—N/a	1	—N/a	—N/a	—N/a	—N/a
Cuscatlán	3	2	1	—N/a	—N/a	—N/a	—N/a	—N/a	—N/a	—N/a
La Libertad	10	7	2	—N/a	1	—N/a	—N/a	—N/a	—N/a	—N/a
La Paz	4	3	1	—N/a	—N/a	—N/a	—N/a	—N/a	—N/a	—N/a
La Unión	3	2	—N/a	—N/a	—N/a	—N/a	—N/a	—N/a	—N/a	1
Morazán	3	2	—N/a	1	—N/a	—N/a	—N/a	—N/a	—N/a	—N/a
San Miguel	6	3	—N/a	1	1	—N/a	1	—N/a	—N/a	—N/a
San Salvador	24	17	3	1	1	—N/a	—N/a	1	1	—N/a
San Vicente	3	2	—N/a	—N/a	—N/a	—N/a	—N/a	—N/a	—N/a	1
Santa Ana	7	5	1	—N/a	1	—N/a	—N/a	—N/a	—N/a	—N/a
Sonsonate	6	4	1	—N/a	—N/a	—N/a	—N/a	—N/a	—N/a	1 (Note: GANA's deputy from Sonsonate died in office in 2020, and his successor left the party to become an independent.)
Usulután	5	3	1	1	—N/a	—N/a	—N/a	—N/a	—N/a	—N/a
Total	84	56	11	4	4	2	1	1	1	4

== List of deputies ==
Composition of the XIII Legislative Assembly by department on 1 May 2021

Department	Deputy	Political affiliation
Ahuachapán	Luis Armando Figueroa Rodríguez	Nuevas Ideas
Ahuachapán	Ricardo Ernesto Godoy Peñate	Nationalist Republican Alliance
Ahuachapán	José Serafín Orantes Rodríguez	National Coalition Party
Ahuachapán	Estuardo Ernesto Rodríguez Pérez	Nuevas Ideas
Cabañas	Rodil Amílcar Ayala Nerio	Nuevas Ideas
Cabañas	José Ilofio García Torres	Nuevas Ideas
Cabañas	Carlos Armando Reyes Ramos (Note: Originally elected as a member of ARENA, later became an independent.)	Independent
Chalatenango	Francisco Alexander Guardado Deras	Nuevas Ideas
Chalatenango	Reynaldo Antonio López Cardoza	National Coalition Party
Chalatenango	Saúl Enrique Mancía	Nuevas Ideas
Cuscatlán	Jonathan Isaac Hernández Ramírez	Nuevas Ideas
Cuscatlán	Janneth Xiomara Molina	Nuevas Ideas
Cuscatlán	Alberto Armando Romero Rodríguez	Nationalist Republican Alliance
La Libertad	Walter Amílcar Alemán Hernández	Nuevas Ideas
La Libertad	Romeo Alexander Auerbach Flores (Note: Originally elected as a member of GANA, later became an independent.)	Independent
La Libertad	Rodrigo Ávila Avilés	Nationalist Republican Alliance
La Libertad	Salvador Alberto Chacón García	Nuevas Ideas
La Libertad	Erick Alfredo García Salguero	Nuevas Ideas
La Libertad	José Francisco Lira Alvarado	Nationalist Republican Alliance
La Libertad	Norma Idalia Lobo Martel	Nuevas Ideas
La Libertad	Sandra Yanira Martínez Tobar	Nuevas Ideas
La Libertad	Ricardo Humberto Rivas Villanueva	Nuevas Ideas
La Libertad	Rebeca Aracely Santos de González	Nuevas Ideas
La Paz	Walter David Coto Ayala	Nuevas Ideas
La Paz	Marcela Balbina Pineda Erazo	Nuevas Ideas
La Paz	Herbert Azael Rodas Díaz	Nuevas Ideas
La Paz	Rosa María Romero	Nationalist Republican Alliance
La Unión	Jorge Luis Rosales Ríos	Independent
La Unión	Edwin Antonio Serpas Ibarra	Nuevas Ideas
La Unión	William Eulises Soriano Herrera	Nuevas Ideas
Morazán	José Bladimir Barahona Hernández	Nuevas Ideas
Morazán	Jaime Dagoberto Guevara Argueta	Farabundo Martí National Liberation Front
Morazán	Juan Alberto Rodríguez Escobar	Nuevas Ideas
San Miguel	Francisco Eduardo Amaya Benítez	Nuevas Ideas
San Miguel	Dina Yamileth Argueta Avelar	Farabundo Martí National Liberation Front
San Miguel	Reinaldo Alcides Carballo Carballo	Christian Democratic Party
San Miguel	Suni Saraí Cedillos de Interiano	Nuevas Ideas
San Miguel	Caleb Neftalí Navarro Rivera	Nuevas Ideas
San Miguel	Numan Pompilio Salgado García	Grand Alliance for National Unity
San Salvador	Rodrigo Javier Ayala Claros	Nuevas Ideas
San Salvador	Yolanda Anabel Belloso de Carranza	Farabundo Martí National Liberation Front
San Salvador	Carlos Hermann Bruch Cornejo	Nuevas Ideas
San Salvador	Suecy Beverley Callejas Estrada	Nuevas Ideas
San Salvador	Ernesto Alfredo Castro Aldana	Nuevas Ideas
San Salvador	Ana María Margarita Escobar López	Nationalist Republican Alliance
San Salvador	Ana Magdalena Figueroa Figueroa	Nuevas Ideas
San Salvador	Rubén Reynaldo Flores Escobar	Nuevas Ideas
San Salvador	Guillermo Antonio Gallegos Navarrete	Grand Alliance for National Unity
San Salvador	Francisco Josué García Villatoro	Nuevas Ideas
San Salvador	Dania Abigail González Rauda	Nuevas Ideas
San Salvador	Christian Reynaldo Guevara Guadrón	Nuevas Ideas
San Salvador	Iris Ivonne Hernández González	Nuevas Ideas
San Salvador	Edgardo Antonio Meléndez Mulato	Nuevas Ideas
San Salvador	Aronnette Rebeca Mencía Díaz	Nuevas Ideas
San Salvador	Claudia Mercedes Ortiz Menjívar	Vamos
San Salvador	René Alfredo Portillo Cuadra	Nationalist Republican Alliance
San Salvador	Katheryn Alexia Rivas González	Nuevas Ideas
San Salvador	Héctor Leonel Rodríguez Uceda	Nuevas Ideas
San Salvador	Elisa Marcela Rosales Ramírez	Nuevas Ideas
San Salvador	Dennis Fernando Salinas Bermúdez	Nuevas Ideas
San Salvador	José Asunción Urbina Alvarenga	Nuevas Ideas
San Salvador	Marcela Guadalupe Villatoro Alvarado	Nationalist Republican Alliance
San Salvador	John Tennant Wright Sol	Nuestro Tiempo
San Vicente	Gerardo Balmore Aguilar Soriano	Nuevas Ideas
San Vicente	Edgar Antonio Fuentes Guardado	Nuevas Ideas
San Vicente	Donato Eugenio Vaquerano Rivas	Independent
Santa Ana	Jorge Alberto Castro Valle	Nuevas Ideas
Santa Ana	Lorena Johanna Fuentes de Orantes	Nuevas Ideas
Santa Ana	Felipe Alfredo Martínez Interiano	Nuevas Ideas
Santa Ana	Juan Carlos Mendoza Portillo	Grand Alliance for National Unity
Santa Ana	Cruz Evelyn Merlos Molina	Nuevas Ideas
Santa Ana	José Javier Palomo Nieto	Nationalist Republican Alliance
Santa Ana	Amílcar Giovanny Zaldaña Cáceres	Nuevas Ideas
Sonsonate	José Raúl Chamagua Noyola	Nuevas Ideas
Sonsonate	Samuel Aníbal Martínez Rivas	Nuevas Ideas
Sonsonate	Mauricio Edgardo Ortiz Cardona	Nuevas Ideas
Sonsonate	Silvia Estela Ostorga de Escobar	Nationalist Republican Alliance
Sonsonate	Santos Adelmo Rivas Rivas	Grand Alliance for National Unity
Sonsonate	Héctor Enrique Sales Salguero	Nuevas Ideas
Usulután	Ana Maricela Canales de Guardado	Nuevas Ideas
Usulután	Raúl Neftalí Castillo Rosales	Nuevas Ideas
Usulután	Marleni Esmeralda Funes Rivera	Farabundo Martí National Liberation Front
Usulután	Mauricio Roberto Linares Ramírez	Nationalist Republican Alliance
Usulután	Ángel Josué Lobos Rodríguez	Nuevas Ideas
