= Rosa Amelia Guzmán =

Salvadoran journalist, feminist and suffragette

Rosa Amelia Guzmán was a Salvadoran journalist, feminist and suffragette. Her 1950 speech to the Constituent Assembly was instrumental in women gaining, not just the right to vote, but the rights of citizenship on 14 September. She was one of the first four women elected to serve in the Legislative Assembly of El Salvador.

== Activism ==
As early as 1935, leading intellectual women in El Salvador, including Guzmán, Tránsito Huezo Córdova de Ramírez, Claudia Lars, Matilde Elena López, María Loucel, Ana Rosa Ochoa and Lilian Serpas, were broadcasting programs over El Salvador's first private radio station, La Voz de Cuscatlán discussing social and political issues. In 1945, Guzmán and Ana Rosa Ochoa founded the journal Tribuna Femenina (Feminist Tribune) as the official voice of the Association of Democratic Women of El Salvador. The goal of the Association was to attain suffrage for all women in a democratic society. In 1947, Guzmán, Ochoa, Huezo Córdova and others joined with Graciela de Alfaro Jovel, Marina de Barrios, Luz Cañas Arocha, Lucila de González, Salvadora de Marroquín, Clara Luz Montalvo, Olivia Montalvo, María Cruz Palma (later de Yáñes), Ada Gloria Parreles, Laura de Paz, Estebana Perla, Soledad de Rivera Escobar, María Álvarez de Guillén and Faustina Villegas to form Liga Femenina Salvadoreña (LFS) (Salvadoran Feminist League). Later that same year, Guzmán and Ochoa were the representatives of the LFS at the Primer Congreso Interamericano de Mujeres, held in Guatemala City, Guatemala to discuss international peace initiatives, regional suffrage and civil liberties strategies.

When the LFS received their full charter in 1948, the organization began looking at the current laws and how to better protect women and children's socio-economic, civic and political rights. In 1950, Guzmán and the LFS pressed Reynaldo Galindo Pohl, head of the Constituent Assembly to grant women the right to vote. Though amendments to the law were passed to allow women to vote, their participation in the political process was limited as they were not allowed to serve as parliament members or as president, as women were not full citizens. Guzmán presented arguments to the legislature and was able to persuade them that all Salvadorans over the age of 18 had equal citizenship without regard to gender. Because the change to the constitutional definition of citizenship went into effect on 14 September 1950, that day is celebrated as the day of "legal equality of Salvadoran women".

Upon their success, the LFS then pressed for ordinances to protect the rights of children, including those born out of wedlock, orphans, or delinquents. In the same year, the Tribuna Femenina changed its name to Heraldo Femenino and widened its scope to include economic parity for women. Around this time, Guzmán's name began appearing as Rosa Amelia Guzmán de Araujo, as she had married former president Arturo Araujo, who was an engineer. They had one child, Armando Araujo. In 1956, Guzmán de Araujo, Inés Inocente González, Blanca Ávalos de Méndez and María Isabel Rodríguez, were elected to serve as the first female Deputies in the Legislative Assembly of El Salvador. When her husband died in 1967, Guzmán de Araujo was left in a state of near poverty. The Legislature voted to provide her with a pension of ₡300 per month.

== Sources ==
- García Guevara, Aldo V. (2007). Military Justice and Social Control: El Salvador, 1931--1960. ISBN 978-0-549-26663-1.
- Márquez Espinosa, Esaú; Ortiz Herrera, María del Rocío (2015). "Rosa Amelia Guzmán: La feminista que se volvió diputada de la Asamblea Legislativa de El Salvador [Rosa Amelia Guzmán: The feminist who became a deputy of the Legislative Assembly of El Salvador]". Sociedades encauzadas: geografía, historia y realidad [Channeled Societies: Geography, History and Reality] (PDF) (in Spanish) (Primeraición ed.). Tuxtla Gutiérrez, Mexico: Universidad de Ciencias y Artes de Chiapas. pp. 337–340. ISBN 978-607-8410-14-9. Archived from the original (PDF) on 16 January 2020.
- Navidad Salvador, José Gilberto; Opico Rivas, José Ulices (April 2014). La Construcción del Rol en el Personaje Femenino de la Narrativa de Guerra y Posguerra Civil Salvadoreña (PDF) (Thesis) (in Spanish). San Salvador, El Salvador: Ciudad Universitaria.
