= List of members of the XIV Legislative Assembly of El Salvador =

Members of the Salvadoran legislature

XIV Legislative Assembly
←	XIII	XV	→
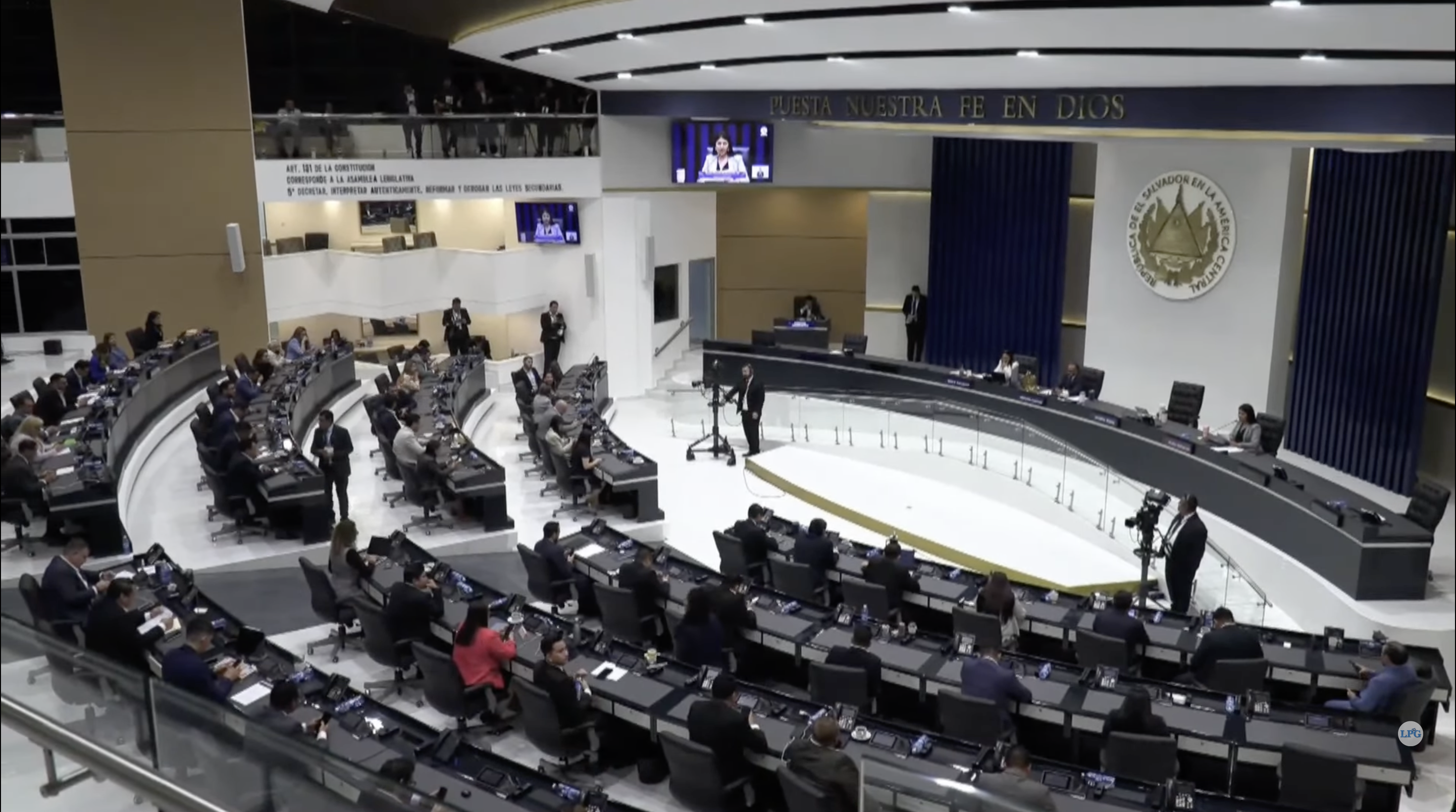
- The XIV Legislative Assembly in session

Overview
- Legislative body: Legislative Assembly
- Meeting place: Blue Room
- Term: 1 May 2024 – 1 May 2027
- Election: 4 February 2024
- Government: NI (54); PCN (2); PDC (1)
- Opposition: ARENA (2); V (1)

Legislative Assembly
- Members: 60
- President: Ernesto Castro

The following is a list of all sixty (60) members of the XIV Legislative Assembly of El Salvador. The session began on 1 May 2024 and will end on 1 May 2027. The XIV Legislative Assembly was the first since 1988 to have 60 seats instead of 84, as on 7 June 2023, the XIII Legislative Assembly voted to reduce the number of seats.

== Leadership ==
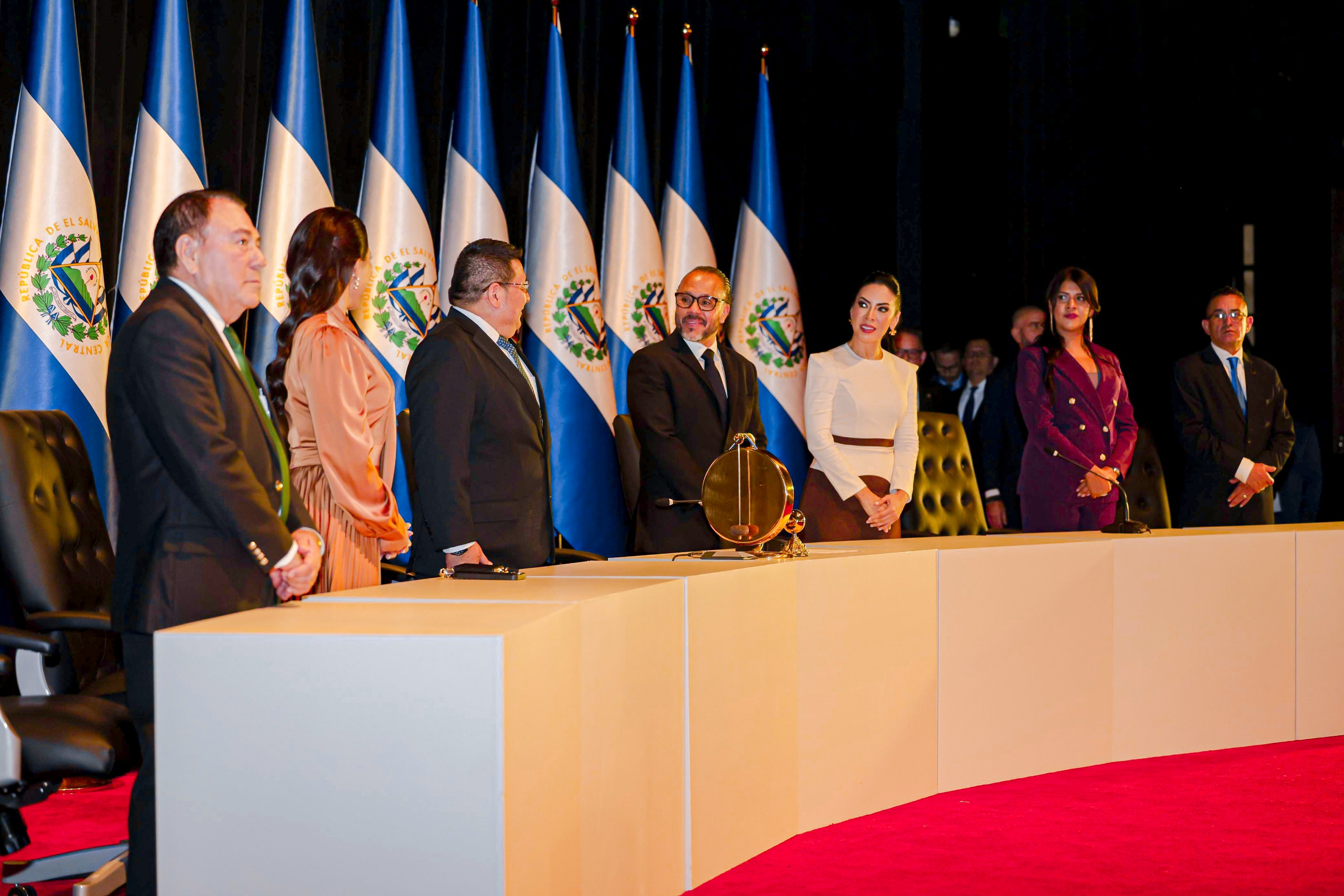
The leadership of the XIV Legislative Assembly

The following table displays the Legislative Assembly's leadership, which were elected on 1 May 2024.

Office	Holder	Political affiliation	Department	Term
President	Ernesto Castro	Nuevas Ideas	San Salvador	1 May 2024 – 1 May 2027
First Vice President	Suecy Callejas	Nuevas Ideas	San Salvador	1 May 2024 – 1 May 2027
Second Vice President	Rodrigo Ayala	Nuevas Ideas	San Salvador	1 May 2024 – 6 June 2024
Second Vice President	Alexia Rivas	Nuevas Ideas	San Salvador	6 June 2024 – 1 May 2027
First Secretary	Elisa Rosales	Nuevas Ideas	San Salvador	1 May 2024 – 1 May 2027
Second Secretary	Reynaldo Cardoza	National Coalition Party	Chalatenango	1 May 2024 – 1 November 2025
Second Secretary	Serafín Orantes	National Coalition Party	Ahuachapán	1 November 2025 – 1 May 2027
Third Secretary	Reinaldo Carballo	Christian Democratic Party	San Miguel	1 May 2024 – 1 May 2027

== Composition by department ==
The following table displays the composition of the XIV Legislative Assembly upon election in February 2024.

Department	Seats	Number of deputies by party				
Department	Seats	NI	ARENA	PCN	PDC	V
Ahuachapán	3	2	—N/a	1	—N/a	—N/a
Cabañas	2	2	—N/a	—N/a	—N/a	—N/a
Chalatenango	2	1	—N/a	1	—N/a	—N/a
Cuscatlán	2	2	—N/a	—N/a	—N/a	—N/a
La Libertad	7	6	1	—N/a	—N/a	—N/a
La Paz	3	3	—N/a	—N/a	—N/a	—N/a
La Unión	2	2	—N/a	—N/a	—N/a	—N/a
Morazán	2	2	—N/a	—N/a	—N/a	—N/a
San Miguel	5	4	—N/a	—N/a	1	—N/a
San Salvador	16	14	1	—N/a	—N/a	1
San Vicente	2	2	—N/a	—N/a	—N/a	—N/a
Santa Ana	5	5	—N/a	—N/a	—N/a	—N/a
Sonsonate	5	5	—N/a	—N/a	—N/a	—N/a
Usulután	4	4	—N/a	—N/a	—N/a	—N/a
Total	60	54	2	2	1	1

== List of deputies ==
The following table lists the deputies elected to the Legislative Assembly on 4 February 2024, however, the results were not announced until 18 February due to delays in counting. The deputies are arranged in alphabetical order by department.

Department	Deputy	Political affiliation
Ahuachapán	José Serafín Orantes Rodríguez	National Coalition Party
Ahuachapán	Estuardo Ernesto Rodríguez Pérez	Nuevas Ideas
Ahuachapán	Herbert Antonio Sierra Rivera	Nuevas Ideas
Cabañas	Nancy Yanira Alfaro Márquez	Nuevas Ideas
Cabañas	José Francisco Menjívar Barahona	Nuevas Ideas
Chalatenango	Reynaldo Antonio López Cardoza	National Coalition Party
Chalatenango	Saúl Enrique Mancía	Nuevas Ideas
Cuscatlán	Jonathan Isaac Hernández Ramírez	Nuevas Ideas
Cuscatlán	Janneth Xiomara Molina	Nuevas Ideas
La Libertad	Walter Amílcar Alemán Hernández	Nuevas Ideas
La Libertad	Salvador Alberto Chacón García	Nuevas Ideas
La Libertad	Sharon Sweet Alexandra Hernández de Canjura	Nuevas Ideas
La Libertad	Sandra Patricia Interiano Zarceño	Nuevas Ideas
La Libertad	José Francisco Lira Alvarado	Nationalist Republican Alliance
La Libertad	Norma Idalia Lobo Martel	Nuevas Ideas
La Libertad	Ricardo Humberto Rivas Villanueva	Nuevas Ideas
La Paz	Walter David Coto Ayala	Nuevas Ideas
La Paz	Adolfo Antonio Rivas Ramírez	Nuevas Ideas
La Paz	Herbert Azael Rodas Díaz	Nuevas Ideas
La Unión	José Óscar Robles Sorto	Nuevas Ideas
La Unión	William Eulises Soriano Herrera	Nuevas Ideas
Morazán	José Bladimir Barahona Hernández	Nuevas Ideas
Morazán	Juan Alberto Rodríguez Escobar	Nuevas Ideas
San Miguel	Francisco Eduardo Amaya Benítez	Nuevas Ideas
San Miguel	Reinaldo Alcides Carballo Carballo	Christian Democratic Party
San Miguel	Andrés Antonio Miranda Martínez	Nuevas Ideas
San Miguel	Caleb Neftalí Navarro Rivera	Nuevas Ideas
San Miguel	Erick Josué Romero Portillo	Nuevas Ideas
San Salvador	Rodrigo Javier Ayala Claros	Nuevas Ideas
San Salvador	Suecy Beverley Callejas Estrada	Nuevas Ideas
San Salvador	Ernesto Alfredo Castro Aldana	Nuevas Ideas
San Salvador	Ana Magdalena Figueroa Figueroa	Nuevas Ideas
San Salvador	Rubén Reynaldo Flores Escobar	Nuevas Ideas
San Salvador	Francisco Josué García Villatoro	Nuevas Ideas
San Salvador	Diana Teresa González Fuentes	Nuevas Ideas
San Salvador	Dania Abigaíl González Rauda	Nuevas Ideas
San Salvador	Christian Reynaldo Guevara Guadrón	Nuevas Ideas
San Salvador	Edgardo Antonio Meléndez Mulato	Nuevas Ideas
San Salvador	Claudia Mercedes Ortiz Menjívar	Vamos
San Salvador	Katherin Alexia Rivas González	Nuevas Ideas
San Salvador	Elisa Marcela Rosales Ramírez	Nuevas Ideas
San Salvador	Dennis Fernando Salinas Bermúdez	Nuevas Ideas
San Salvador	Marcela Guadalupe Villatoro Alvarado	Nationalist Republican Alliance
San Salvador	Benjamín Zavaleta López	Nuevas Ideas
San Vicente	Helen Morena Jovel de Tobar	Nuevas Ideas
San Vicente	Edgar Antonio Fuentes Guardado	Nuevas Ideas
Santa Ana	Lorena Johanna Fuentes de Orantes	Nuevas Ideas
Santa Ana	Felipe Alfredo Martínez Interiano	Nuevas Ideas
Santa Ana	Cruz Evelyn Merlos Molina	Nuevas Ideas
Santa Ana	Claudia Carolina Toledo de Morán	Nuevas Ideas
Santa Ana	Amílcar Giovanny Zaldaña Cáceres	Nuevas Ideas
Sonsonate	José Raúl Chamagua Noyola	Nuevas Ideas
Sonsonate	David Alexander Cupido Ayala	Nuevas Ideas
Sonsonate	Samuel Aníbal Martínez Rivas	Nuevas Ideas
Sonsonate	Mauricio Edgardo Ortiz Cardona	Nuevas Ideas
Sonsonate	Héctor Enrique Sales Salguero	Nuevas Ideas
Usulután	Ana Marisela Canales de Guardado	Nuevas Ideas
Usulután	Raúl Neftalí Castillo Rosales	Nuevas Ideas
Usulután	Johana Paola Hernández Batres	Nuevas Ideas
Usulután	Ángel Josué Lobos Rodríguez	Nuevas Ideas

== List of commissions ==
On 1 May 2024, the Legislative Assembly reduced the number of legislative commissions from 20 to 8. The following table lists the commissions and their leaders for the XIV Legislative Assembly.

Commission	Chairperson	Secretary	Narrator
Politics	Ernesto Castro	Alexia Rivas	Christian Guevara
Finance and Budget	Christian Guevara	William Soriano	Caleb Navarro
Salvadorans in the Exterior, Legislation, and Government	Ana Figueroa	Reynaldo Cardoza	Walter Alemán
National Security and Justice	Caleb Navarro	Walter Coto	Raúl Castillo
Children and Social Integration	Suecy Callejas	Lorena Fuentes	Rubén Flores
Technology, Tourism, and Investment	Rodrigo Ayala	William Soriano	Dania González
Infrastructure and Development	Salvador Chacón	Elisa Rosales	Felipe Interiano
Health, Agriculture, and the Environment	Ricardo Rivas	Juan Rodríguez	Saúl Mancía
Installation (temporary)	Suecy Callejas	William Soriano	Mauricio Ortiz
Transition (temporary)	Raúl Castillo	Reinaldo Carballo	Serafín Orantes
