= Violeta Menjívar =

Salvadoran politician

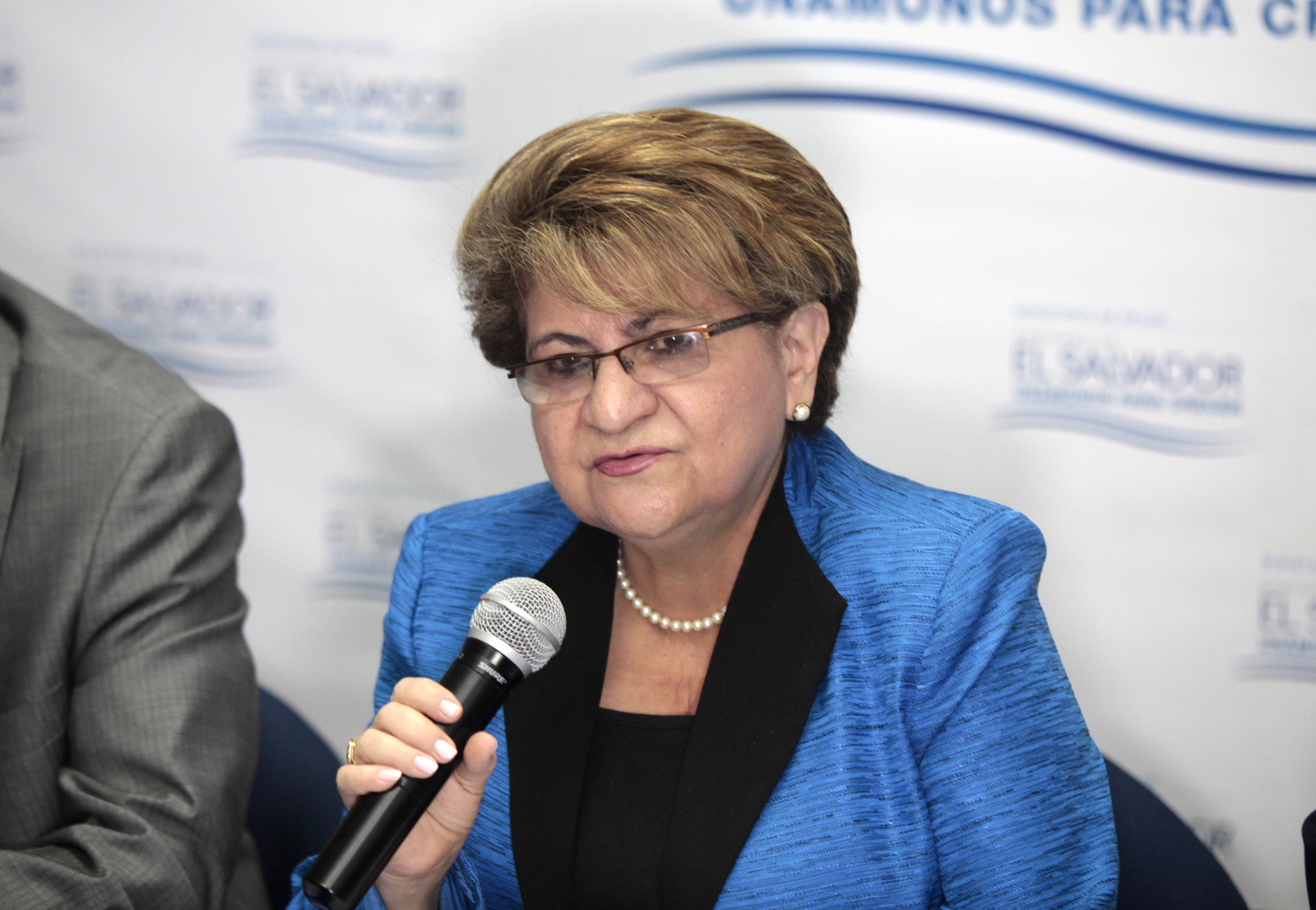

Minister of Health and Social Welfare of El Salvador
- In office 1 June 2014 – 1 June 2019
- Preceded by: María Isabel Rodríguez
- Succeeded by: Ana Orellana

123rd Mayor of San Salvador
- In office 1 May 2006 – 1 May 2009
- Preceded by: Carlos Rivas Zamora
- Succeeded by: Norman Quijano

Personal details
- Born: 1952 (age 73–74) Arcatao, El Salvador
- Party: Farabundo Martí National Liberation Front

Elvia Violeta Menjívar Escalante (born 1952 in Arcatao) is a Salvadoran politician affiliated with the Farabundo Martí National Liberation Front. She has been Minister of Health and Social Welfare since 1 June 2014. She is the former mayor of San Salvador.

Born Elvia Violeta Menjívar in Arcatao, Chalatenango, she studied medicine at the University of El Salvador. In 1979 she became a member of the Fuerzas Populares de Liberación "Farabundo Martí" or FPL, one of five leftist organizations that united to form the current Farabundo Martí National Liberation Front (generally known by its Spanish-language acronym FMLN). During the civil war she provided medical aid to combatants and civilians in the Chalatenango Department.

In 1992 she was elected deputy to the Legislative Assembly of El Salvador, representing the FMLN, a position for which she was re-elected in 2000 and 2003. She was designated by her party as the candidate for the Mayor of San Salvador elections in 2005, defeating the conservative candidate of ARENA, Rodrigo Samayoa. She is the first woman to serve as mayor of San Salvador. She lost in the election of January 18, 2009 to Norman Quijano of the ARENA party.

Political offices
Preceded by Carlos Rivas Zamora	Mayor of San Salvador; 2006-2009	Succeeded by Norman Quijano
