= COVID-19 pandemic in El Salvador =

Ongoing COVID-19 viral pandemic in El Salvador

- Disease: COVID-19
- Pathogen: SARS-CoV-2
- Location: El Salvador
- First outbreak: Wuhan, China
- Index case: Metapán, Santa Ana
- Arrival date: 20 June 2021 (5 years, 4 months and 4 weeks)
- Confirmed cases: 201,967
- Recovered: 172,556
- Deaths: 9,915
- Fatality rate: 4,9%
- Vaccinations: 4,659,970 (total vaccinated); 4,397,817 (fully vaccinated); 11,459,448 (doses administered)

Government website
- Official Statistics—Government of El Salvador

The COVID-19 pandemic in El Salvador was a part of the worldwide pandemic of coronavirus disease 2019 (COVID-19) caused by severe acute respiratory syndrome coronavirus 2 (SARS-CoV-2). The virus was confirmed to have reached El Salvador on 18 March 2020. On 31 March 2020, the first COVID-19 death in El Salvador was confirmed. As of 19 September 2021, El Salvador reported 102,024 cases, 3,114 deaths, and 84,981 recoveries. As of that date El Salvador had arrested a total of 2,424 people for violating quarantine orders, and 1,268,090 people had been tested for the virus.

Transparency International cited El Salvador and Colombia as examples of an "explosion of irregularities and corruption cases" related to the handling of the pandemic in Latin America. The Ministry of Health and Ministry of Treasury, along with other 18 government institutions are currently under investigation by the Attorney General's Office.

== Background ==
On 12 January 2020, the World Health Organization (WHO) confirmed that a novel coronavirus was the cause of a respiratory illness in a cluster of people in Wuhan City, Hubei Province, China, which was reported to the WHO on 31 December 2019.

The case fatality ratio for COVID-19 has been much lower than SARS of 2003, but the transmission has been significantly greater, with a significant total death toll.

== Timeline ==
Cases

Deaths

=== February 2020 ===
On 19 February 2020 Minister of Health Ana Orellana chaired the meeting of the Expanded Health Cabinet to review international health protocols in response to the COVID-19 epidemic. She announced that there were no confirmed cases in the country, that security protocols had been activated at El Salvador International Airport, and assessed the measures under the government’s preventive plan.

=== March 2020 ===
On March 6, El Salvador government declared yellow alert in the country a few hours after Costa Rica reported the first confirmed case in that country.

On March 11, after the World Health Organization classified COVID-19 as a pandemic, President Nayib Bukele declared suspension of all educative activities in public and private schools all over the country for 21 days, followed by a solicitude to the Legislative Assembly of declaring state of emergency and state of exception, in spite of not having any COVID-19 confirmed cases. The Office of the Attorney for the Defense of Human Rights of El Salvador head, Apolonio Tobar, considered the actions taken by the government as "improvised". On 12 March Minister of Health Orellana stated that children, pregnant women and those aged 60 or over would not be required to undergo the 30-day quarantine. On 13 March, Bukele declared a red alert on the country. As the night of 14 March, both decrees were approved, declaring state of emergency for 30 days and state of exception for 15 days, accompanied by prohibition of people circulation.

On March 16, a diplomatic dispute between El Salvador and Mexico developed when President Bukele accused the Mexican government of "being irresponsible" allowing a dozen people with COVID-19 to board a plane bound for El Salvador International Airport. Mexican foreign secretary Marcelo Ebrard said "all flights to El Salvador, including the one mentioned by the president [Bukele], have been cancelled"; furthermore, Mexican deputy health minister Hugo López-Gatell Ramírez denied the charge, and declared that tests showed the individuals in question were virus-free.

President Nayib Bukele banned public gathering of more than 500 people, prohibited most international travellers and shut down educational institutions on 17 March. An infectologist who avoided the quarantine after a trip to Germany is being investigated.

On March 18, President Bukele announced the first confirmed case of COVID-19 in El Salvador, which was detected in the Hospital Nacional General "Arturo Morales", in Metapán. The case was identified as a male and according to the General Direction of Migration and Foreigners (Dirección General de Migración y Extranjería) he was in Italy, where presumably he was infected Two more cases were confirmed on 20 March.

On March 21, El Salvador declared a 30-day curfew in response to the coronavirus crisis.

On March 29, the Legislative Assembly approved a new decree in order to extend the exception regime for 15 days more.

On March 30, hundreds of citizens defied restrictions and went to the streets to demand the promised help.

On March 31, the first COVID-19 death in El Salvador was confirmed—a woman over 60 who arrived from United States on 12 March who was classified in a critical state.

=== April 2020 ===
On 1 April, the government had established 96 centers (facilities) of quarantine, with 4,276 people being retained in them, according with the official website. Furthermore, the second death was confirmed, an 89-year-old man from San Francisco Gotera, who resulted negative in the first test, but turned out positive in a second one practiced on 31 March.

On 2 April, 5 more cases were confirmed, totalizing 46 cases in the country.

On 3 April, the government confirmed the third death— a 60-year-old man who returned from the United States on 14 March, showing symptoms for COVID-19 and turned out positive on 30 March.

On 4 April, the first two recovered patients were reported by the government. A 37-year-old man who arrived from Italy and a 46-man who arrived from Spain.

On 6 April, President Bukele announced the obliged home quarantine will be extended for 15 days more starting from 20 April, this is because the last quarantine term would terminate on 19 April. President Bukele said he ordered the police to be "more strict" in order to guarantee the measures taken by the government. The government also announced they have registered until that day 78 COVID-19 confirmed cases, also reporting one more death and three recoveries. Furthermore, the fourth death was reported by the government— a 41-year-old man who arrived from Guatemala on 15 March.

On 7 April, the fifth death was confirmed, a 69-year-old male surgeon who arrived the country from Canada.

On 9 April, the government reported a sixth death.

On 11 April, the government inaugurated two hospitals: the first one in Jiquilisco and the second in Tecoluca, with the purpose of attending up to 500 COVID-19 infected people.

On 15 April, the International Monetary Fund announced the approval of 389 million dollars to El Salvador, with the purpose of strengthening the most affected places of the country.

On 16 April, the Supreme Court of El Salvador ruled that the government couldn't confiscate vehicles, property or arrest people for allegedly failing to comply with quarantine order without congressional legislation approving the measures. Bukele stated his intentions to defy the ruling. Over 2,000 people had already been arrested for violations of quarantine restrictions. Also, the seventh death was reported by the government, a 4-year-old child who died on Hospital Bloom.

On 22 April, the government confirmed the eight death, a 62-year-old man who arrived from the United States.

Following an outbreak of alleged gang violence in late April that killed 77 people, President Bukele imposed a lockdown on prisons containing gang members on 26 April. Under the government's crackdown, gang members were locked in crowded cells for 23 hours a day; cells were barricaded with plywood and sheets of metal; mobile and wifi signals were blocked, and rival gang members were mixed together. Human Rights Watch has criticized the treatment of prisoners as humiliating, degrading and endangering their health in the midst of the COVID-19 pandemic.

On 27 April, the ninth death was confirmed—a 48-year-old-man who had kidney failure.

On 30 April, the tenth COVID-19 death was reported by the Ministry of Health—a 56-year-old man who was infected locally.

=== May 2020 ===
President Nayib Bukele's "containment centers" where thousands of Salvadorans have been detained for more than a month at a time without judicial review, came under criticism from human rights advocates. The government has reported 1,265 cases and 26 deaths from the COVID-19 pandemic as of 17 May.

=== June 2020 ===
On 22 June, President Bukele dedicated the first phase of the Hospital El Salvador, a permanent conversion of the former International Fair and Convention Center (CIFCO) in San Salvador. At the inauguration of the first phase of the hospital President Bukele claimed it would be largest hospital in Latin America built exclusively to treat COVID-19 patients, with a capacity of 1,000 ICU beds when fully built out.

=== September 2021 ===
On 25 September, President Bukele Nayib Bukele said that the Central American nation will begin administering a third dose of COVID-19 vaccine to various groups including the elderly, healthworkers and people with underlying health conditions.

== Statistics ==
=== Charts ===
The graphs show the development of the pandemic starting from 18 March 2020, the day when the first case was detected in Metapán.

==== Cumulative number of confirmed cases, active cases, recoveries and deaths ====
View source data.

==== New cases per day ====
View source data.

==== Deaths per day ====
View source data.

==== Recoveries per day ====
View source data.

==== Tests per day ====
View source data.

Sources:

- Lab-Dat.
- Official statistics.

== Vaccination ==
El Salvador is one of the leading countries in Central America concerning the vaccination against COVID-19. By the end of May 2021, El Salvador has administered 28.11 doses per 100 people which corresponds to 1,832,228 doses. El Salvador's total supply of vaccines as of May 2021 equals 4 million doses which covers 30.8% of the Salvadoran population. 417,000 doses have been delivered through the COVAX mechanism, a global initiative that seeks equitable access to COVID-19 vaccines. Furthermore, El Salvador has received vaccine doses as a result of vaccine diplomacy, notably 150,000 doses of the CoronaVac vaccine donated by China along with two million doses of the Chinese immunizer that the nation had purchased. The remaining vaccine doses consist of the AstraZeneca/Oxford vaccine that the country has purchased. The Salvadoran president Nayib Bukele has donated thousands of vaccine doses to several Honduran towns as a respond to pleas for vaccine supply that Honduran mayors have posted on social media.

== See also ==
- COVID-19 pandemic in North America
- COVID-19 pandemic by country
- 2020 in Central America
- History of smallpox in Mexico
- HIV/AIDS in Latin America
- 2013–2014 chikungunya outbreak
- 2009 swine flu pandemic
- 2019–2020 dengue fever epidemic
