= Sandra Yanira Martínez Tobar =

Salvadoran meteorologist and politician (1959–2026)

Sandra Martínez
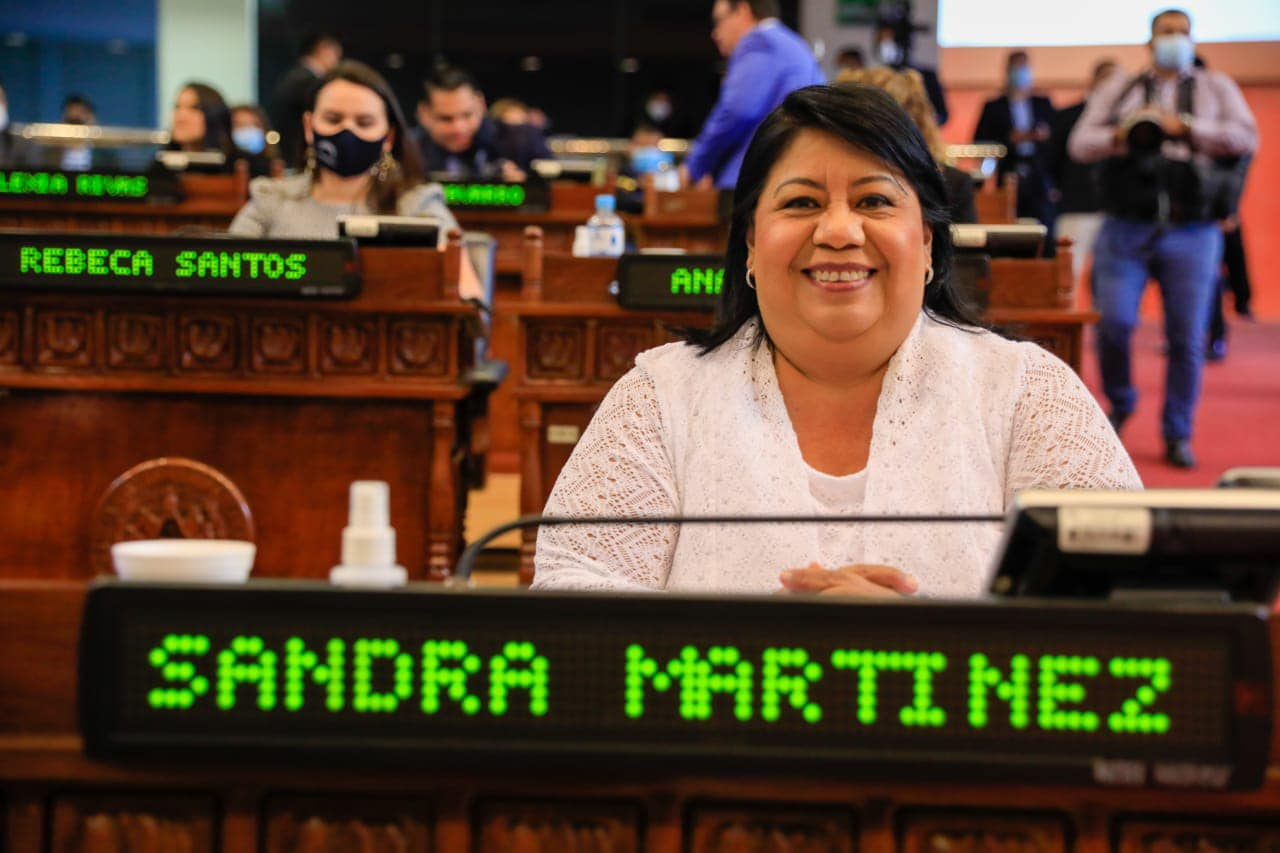
- Martínez in 2021

Deputy of the Legislative Assembly of El Salvador from La Libertad
- In office 1 May 2021 – 1 May 2024

Personal details
- Born: Sandra Yanira Martínez Tobar; 1959 San Salvador, El Salvador
- Died: 25 October 2026 (aged 67)
- Party: Nuevas Ideas
- Education: University of El Salvador
- Occupation: Politician, meteorologist

Sandra Yanira Martínez Tobar (1959 – 25 October 2026) was a Salvadoran pioneer in the field of meteorology, being the first woman to work in the National Meteorological Service later known as the Environmental Observatory of the Ministry of Environment and Natural Resources, from where she retired in 2019. During the legislative and municipal elections on February 28, 2021, she was elected deputy of the Legislative Assembly of El Salvador for La Libertad Department during the period from 1 May 2021 to 1 May 2024.

== Weather career ==
Martínez's interest in meteorology began at the age of 19 through a scholarship program promoted by the National Meteorological Service through the University of El Salvador. She was a fellow in the World Meteorological Organization, where she obtained a specialty in aeronautical, hydrological, and maritime. She also graduated from the University of El Salvador. In addition, she carried out studies in the office of the National Oceanic and Atmospheric Administration. She was certified and accredited as a meteorologist and hydrologist from the United States Department of Commerce, among other studies carried out in Spain, Guatemala, and the United States.

She worked for 19 years in aeronautical meteorology at Comalapa and Ilopango airports.

=== "Weather girl" meme ===
In 2017, she was mentioned as a trending topic on social networks when compared to other television presenters who read weather reports. However, at that time, Martínez took the situation with grace and, in response, elaborated with more details about her academic and professional training that have qualified her for her position. In El Salvador News, she returned in 2020 as "Weather girl."

=== Retirement ===
On 6 December 2019, she retired at the age of 60, after 17 years of work in the Ministry of Environment and Natural Resources, and after 23 more years in the Agriculture portfolio. She withdrew due to carrying out work for the vindication of working women in science.

"Science doesn't make you a millionaire, but it gives you satisfaction in what you do, you can learn and help the population to prevent and mitigate disasters."

=== Reporting ===
After she left the Ministry of the Environment, she made a complaint to the institution concerning malpractice that spanned almost four decades. In an interview conducted by the Pencho y Aída program of Radio Fuego El Salvador, her first statements were made. She revealed how the sale of a 100-year historical archive on the meteorological conditions of El Salvador was carried out as recycled paper. Although initially, no progress came of the complaint, eventually, Nayib Bukele as president, responded to the complaint by firing the then meteorology manager.

== Political career ==
In 2021, she was launched as a candidate for deputy of Nuevas Ideas in La Libertad. She joined as president of the Environment Commission on May 6, 2021, on behalf of New Ideas in compliance with article 40 of the internal regulations of the Legislative Assembly of El Salvador. She did not obtain enough votes to stand for re-election in the 2024 legislative election, however, after Rebeca Santos' candidacy was canceled and Erick García resigned from the Legislative Assembly, Nuevas Ideas selected Martínez as one of its replacement candidates for La Libertad. Martínez did not win re-election.

== Death ==
Martínez died on 25 October 2026, at the age of 67.

== See also ==
- List of members of the XIII Legislative Assembly of El Salvador
