= Saúl Enrique Mancía =

Salvadoran politician

Deputy of the Legislative Assembly of El Salvador from Chalatenango
- Incumbent
- Assumed office 1 May 2021

Personal details
- Born: 1983 or 1984 (age 42–43)
- Party: Nuevas Ideas
- Other political affiliations: Farabundo Martí National Liberation Front
- Education: University of El Salvador
- Occupation: Politician

Saúl Enrique Mancía (born 1983 or 1984) is a Salvadoran politician and communications specialist who has served as a deputy of the Legislative Assembly from the department of Chalatenango since 2021. He serves as a member of the agriculture commission and the public works, transportation, and housing commission. Mancía is a member of Nuevas Ideas.

== Early life ==
Saúl Enrique Mancía was born in 1983 or 1984.

Mancía graduated from the University of El Salvador in 2014 as a Bachelor of Journalism. Mancía and José Raúl Hernández Maldonado published a joint thesis regarding the 2012–2014 Salvadoran gang truce on 26 August 2014.

From October 2009 to August 2012, Mancía worked as a general producer for National Television of El Salvador. From October 2013 to February 2014, he worked as a producer for Channel 29.

== Early political career ==
From May 2009 to May 2012, Mancía served as an alderman on the San Ignacio municipal council as a member of the Farabundo Martí National Liberation Front.

From August 2012 to July 2019, Mancía served as a communications technical specialist for the National Medication Directorate. From 8 August 2019 to 15 August 2020, he served as the chief of promotion, advertising, and communications for the government of Salvadoran President Nayib Bukele.

Mancía has experience working in the agriculture and livestock industries.

== Deputy of the Legislative Assembly ==
Mancía ran as a candidate for deputy to the Legislative Assembly from the department of Chalatenango during the 2021 legislative election. He ran as a candidate from Nuevas Ideas and was the party's second candidate in Chalatenango, after Francisco Alexander Guardado Deras. During his campaign, Mancía criticized the political opposition in the Legislative Assembly for its reaction to the COVID-19 pandemic and for blocking Bukele's political agenda within the legislature. He also claimed that the incumbent deputies from Chalatenango "have never represented the department and have never carried out actions which really benefited the department's population" ("nunca han representado al departamento y jamás han realizado acciones que beneficien realmente a la población de la localidad"). Mancía was elected as a deputy on election day with 14,059 marks. He was the third of three proprietary deputies elected, and Krissa Osiris Marín Jiménez was elected as Mancía's supplement deputy.

Mancía is a permanent member of the agriculture commission and the public works, transportation, and housing commission, on which he holds the position of orator; Mancía was also a member of an ad hoc commission to study and draft the Water Resources Law in June 2021. Regarding the law, he stated that its objective was to guarantee that every community in El Salvador had access to drinking water. In April 2022, the Legislative Assembly approved a bill which was proposed by Mancía which increased penalties for individuals who steal livestock. Mancía supports the expansion of Uber or public transportation methods similar to Uber within El Salvador, stating in January 2023 that its expansion "is necessary" ("es necesario") for the "modernization" ("modernización") of the country's public transportation system. On 13 June 2023, Mancía voted to reduce the number of municipalities in El Salvador from 262 to 44. Before the law was approved, he proposed an amendment to the bill—which had been proposed by Bukele on 1 June—to reassign the district of San Fernando from Chalatenango Norte to Chalatenango Centro. Although he did not give a reason for the amendment, it was approved regardless.

During Nuevas Ideas' July 2023 primary elections ahead of the 2024 legislative election, Mancía was elected as the party's first of two candidates for Chalatenango's two seats (Note: In June 2023, the Legislative Assembly voted to reduce the number of seats in the Legislative Assembly from 84 to 60. As a result, Chalatenango's seat count was reduced from 3 to 2.) in the Legislative Assembly with 910 votes. Hugo Dagoberto Mata Portillo was elected as Mancía's supplement deputy. On 13 February 2024, after vote counting for the legislative election had been delayed by the Supreme Electoral Court due to technical issues, the TSE announced that Mancía had won one of Chalatenango's legislative seats and the National Coalition Party's Reynaldo Cardoza won the second seat; Mancía won 19,282 marks. Mancía is the orator of the health, agriculture, and environment commission.

== Personal life ==
Mancía is married. In May 2022, he and his wife took out a US$111,000 loan from the Mortgage Bank to purchase a plot of land in San Salvador.

== Electoral history ==
Year	Office	Type	Party	Main opponent	Party	Votes for Mancía				Result	Swing
Year	Office	Type	Party	Main opponent	Party	Total	%	P.	±%	Result	Swing
2021	Deputy of the Legislative Assembly	General	NI	N/A		14,059	N/A	3rd	N/A	Won	Gain
2024	Deputy of the Legislative Assembly	General	NI	N/A		19,282	N/A	1st	N/A	Won	Hold

== Publications ==
Mancía has authored one thesis:

1. Qualitative Content Analysis: The Construction of the "Truce with the Gangs" Concept in the Journalistic Information of the "Nation" Section of La Prensa Gráfica (2014, University of El Salvador; OCLC 490604191)
