= María Isabel Rodríguez (government official) =

Salvadoran physician, politician (b. 1922)

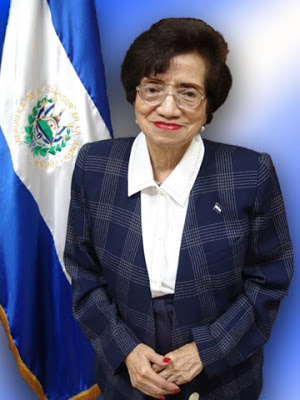

Minister of Health and Social Welfare of El Salvador
- In office 1 June 2009 – 1 June 2014
- President: Mauricio Funes
- Preceded by: Guillermo Maza
- Succeeded by: Violeta Menjívar

Deputy of the Legislative Assembly of El Salvador
- In office 1956–1957

Rector of the University of El Salvador
- In office 1999–2007
- Preceded by: José Benjamín López Guillén
- Succeeded by: Rufino Quezada

Personal details
- Born: November 5, 1922 (age 103) San Salvador, El Salvador
- Occupation: Physician, academic

María Isabel Rodríguez (born November 5, 1922) is a Salvadoran physician, academic, and government official. In 1956, she became one of the first group of four women to enter the Legislative Assembly. From 1999 to 2007, she was the rector of the University of El Salvador. She was appointed El Salvador's Minister of Health in 2009, a position she held until 2014.

== Early life ==
Rodríguez was born in San Salvador, El Salvador, on November 5, 1922. She earned her medical degree from the University of El Salvador in 1949 (despite being warned by the dean against joining such a "man's profession"). She completed postgraduate degrees in cardiology and physiological sciences in Mexico.

In 1954, she returned to her alma mater and began a career as cardiovascular physiologist and biomedical researcher.

== Political career ==
In May 1956, she was elected to the Legislative Assembly, one of the first four women to enter the Legislative Assembly. However, she resigned from the Legislative Assembly in January 1957.

In 2009, she was appointed Minister of Health of El Salvador. Rodriguez has been credited for her role in establishing healthcare reform in that country.

At the end of her term in 2014, she was named Presidential Advisor on Health and Education, working to achieve universal health coverage and universal high-quality education in her country.

== Academic career ==
In 1967, she was appointed Dean of the Faculty of Medicine of the University of El Salvador, a position she held until 1971. She left El Salvador in 1972 after the university faced military intervention (part of the run-up to the Salvadoran Civil War).

From 1972 to 1994, Rodríguez worked as a consultant for the Pan American Health Organization/World Health Organization, supporting the Representative Office in developing teaching and research centres, as well as health and science programs, in Latin American countries, including Mexico, the Dominican Republic, and Venezuela. From 1985 to 1994, she worked as a consultant for the International Health Training Program, based in Washington, D.C.

In 1994, Rodríguez returned to the University of El Salvador as an advisor and professor in the Faculty of Medicine. Over the course of her career, she authored over one hundred publications in the fields of biomedicine, medical education, international health, primary health care, and university policy.

In 1999, she was elected rector of the university, a position she held until 2007. She was the first woman to hold this position.

In 2015, she was a founding member of the Pan-American Academy of the History of Medicine, established at the University of Costa Rica. Since then, she has served on its board of directors as Honorary Vice President for the Central America and Caribbean Section.

== Awards and honours ==
In 2015, the Pan American Health Organization/World Health Organization named her a Public Health Hero of the Americas, their highest distinction. She has been awarded honorary doctorates from at least 12 universities, including the University of Guadalajara and Central American University.

María Isabel Rodríguez was featured in Shaping The World, an art exhibition of artistic photography by Theo Chalmers in which the Pan American Health Organization presents artistic photos of public health leaders who seized research for health to improve health and health equity. Her photo is available here.

== Personal life ==
Rodríguez currently lives in San Salvador, El Salvador. She turned 100 in November 2022.
