= Liga Femenina Salvadoreña =

Liga Femenina Salvadoreña (Salvadoran Women's League), was a women's organization in El Salvador, founded in 1947.

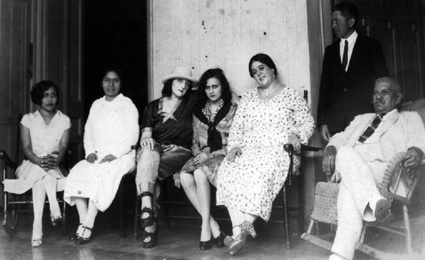
Liga Femenina Salvadoreña

It is known for the role it played in the campaign for women's suffrage.

The women's movement organized late in El Salvador. The dictator Maximiliano Hernández Martínez introduced a limited form of conditional women's suffrage in hope of securing more voters in 1939, but the conditions were so high that 80% of women were still not eligible to vote.

Salvadoran women participated in the struggle for democracy against Martínez and the democratization process that followed his fall, and the first three women's organizations were founded in the 1940s: the Asociación de Mujeres Democráticas de El Salvador (AMD) (Association of Democratic Women of El Salvador) with their paper Feminist Tribute under Rosa Amelia Guzmán (1944), the Frente Democrático Femenino (FDF) with its paper Democratic Woman under Matilde Elena López (1945), and the Liga Femenina Salvadoreña (1947) under Ana Rosa Ochoa with its paper Heraldo Femenino.

The Liga Femenina Salvadoreña, while being the last of the three, were known to be the most feiminst one; while the other two were more focused on the democratization as such, the Liga Femenina Salvadoreña focused primarily on women's issues and equality. Full women's suffrage was finally introduced in 1950.
