= Blanca Ávalos de Méndez =

Salvadoran politician

Deputy of the Legislative Assembly of El Salvador
- In office 1956–1960

Personal details
- Party: Revolutionary Party of Democratic Unification
- Occupation: Politician

Blanca Alicia Ávalos de Méndez was a Salvadoran politician. In 1956 she became one of the first group of women to be elected the Legislative Assembly. She remained a member until 1960.

== Biography ==
Ávalos was a Revolutionary Party of Democratic Unification (PRUD) candidate in the 1956 parliamentary elections. With the PRUD winning all 54 seats, she became one of the first group of four women to enter the Legislative Assembly. She was re-elected in 1958, serving until 1960.
