= 1956 Salvadoran legislative election =

- 15 May 1956
- All 54 seats in the Legislative Assembly; 28 seats needed for a majority
| Party | Leader | Vote % | Seats | +/– |
|---|---|---|---|---|
| PRUD | Óscar Osorio | 94.36 | 54 | 0 |
This lists parties that won seats. See the complete results below.
Results by constituency
| President of the Legislative Assembly before | President of the Legislative Assembly after |
|---|---|
| José María Peralta Salazar; PRUD | René Carmona Dárdano; PRUD |

Legislative elections were held in El Salvador on 15 May 1956. The result was a victory for the Revolutionary Party of Democratic Unification, which won all 54 seats. The election saw four women elected as deputies, the first in the history of El Salvador.

== Results ==
| Party | Votes | % | Seats | +/– |
|---|---|---|---|---|
| Revolutionary Party of Democratic Unification | 552,000 | 94.36 | 54 | 0 |
| National Action Party | 33,000 | 5.64 | 0 | New |
| Total | 585,000 | 100.00 | 54 | 0 |
Source: Nohlen

== Elected Members ==
| Department | Deputy | Political affiliation |
|---|---|---|
| San Salvador | René Carmona Dárdano | Revolutionary Party of Democratic Unification |
| San Salvador | Herbert Lewy van Severen | Revolutionary Party of Democratic Unification |
| San Salvador | Víctor Manuel Esquivel Rodríguez | Revolutionary Party of Democratic Unification |
| San Salvador | Carlos Zepeda | Revolutionary Party of Democratic Unification |
| San Salvador | María Isabel Rodríguez | Revolutionary Party of Democratic Unification |
| San Salvador | Blanca Ávalos de Méndez | Revolutionary Party of Democratic Unification |
| San Salvador | Jorge Lucifer Lardé y Larín | Revolutionary Party of Democratic Unification |
| San Salvador | Rafael Fernández Saravia | Revolutionary Party of Democratic Unification |
| Santa Ana | Roberto Antonio Barahona | Revolutionary Party of Democratic Unification |
| Santa Ana | Raúl Méndez Flores | Revolutionary Party of Democratic Unification |
| Santa Ana | José Rodolfo Bolaños | Revolutionary Party of Democratic Unification |
| Santa Ana | Miguel Ángel Miranda Aparicio | Revolutionary Party of Democratic Unification |
| Santa Ana | Luis Alonso Rendón | Revolutionary Party of Democratic Unification |
| Santa Ana | Roberto Bustamante Lemus | Revolutionary Party of Democratic Unification |
| Chalatenango | José Cándido Morales | Revolutionary Party of Democratic Unification |
| Chalatenango | Carlos Serrano García | Revolutionary Party of Democratic Unification |
| Chalatenango | Salvador Victorino Romero | Revolutionary Party of Democratic Unification |
| Sonsonate | Abraham Francisco Castillo Souza | Revolutionary Party of Democratic Unification |
| Sonsonate | Alonso de León | Revolutionary Party of Democratic Unification |
| Sonsonate | Esteban Falla | Revolutionary Party of Democratic Unification |
| Cuscatlán | Mauricio Velásquez Arévalo | Revolutionary Party of Democratic Unification |
| Cuscatlán | Rafael Aráuz Rodríguez | Revolutionary Party of Democratic Unification |
| Cuscatlán | Rafael Antonio Echeverría | Revolutionary Party of Democratic Unification |
| Ahuachapán | Alfonso Onofre Salaverría | Revolutionary Party of Democratic Unification |
| Ahuachapán | Erasmo Antonio Saldaña | Revolutionary Party of Democratic Unification |
| Ahuachapán | Alejandro Barrientos Leiva | Revolutionary Party of Democratic Unification |
| La Paz | Ricardo Rubio Velásquez | Revolutionary Party of Democratic Unification |
| La Paz | Eugenio Velasco | Revolutionary Party of Democratic Unification |
| La Paz | Julio Alberto Domínguez Sosa | Revolutionary Party of Democratic Unification |
| La Libertad | Joaquín Castro Canizales | Revolutionary Party of Democratic Unification |
| La Libertad | José Mauricio Mixco | Revolutionary Party of Democratic Unification |
| La Libertad | José Ernesto Granados | Revolutionary Party of Democratic Unification |
| La Libertad | Miguel Ángel Luna | Revolutionary Party of Democratic Unification |
| Cabañas | Juventino Arteaga | Revolutionary Party of Democratic Unification |
| Cabañas | Manuel Atilio Escobar | Revolutionary Party of Democratic Unification |
| La Unión | José Dolores Guardado | Revolutionary Party of Democratic Unification |
| La Unión | Carlos Antonio Gudiel Godínez | Revolutionary Party of Democratic Unification |
| La Unión | Adán Dolores Dheming | Revolutionary Party of Democratic Unification |
| San Vicente | Francisco Arriola Velasco | Revolutionary Party of Democratic Unification |
| San Vicente | Óscar Gertrudis López | Revolutionary Party of Democratic Unification |
| San Vicente | Manuel Pérez Merino | Revolutionary Party of Democratic Unification |
| Morazán | Heriberto Reyes | Revolutionary Party of Democratic Unification |
| Morazán | Inés Inocente González | Revolutionary Party of Democratic Unification |
| Morazán | Eustacio Antonio Nolasco | Revolutionary Party of Democratic Unification |
| Usulután | Luis Villalta | Revolutionary Party of Democratic Unification |
| Usulután | Juan Ramón Jovel | Revolutionary Party of Democratic Unification |
| Usulután | Arturo Martínez Salgado | Revolutionary Party of Democratic Unification |
| Usulután | Gregorio Alfredo Campos | Revolutionary Party of Democratic Unification |
| Usulután | Rafael Rodríguez González | Revolutionary Party of Democratic Unification |
| San Miguel | Pedro Urquilla | Revolutionary Party of Democratic Unification |
| San Miguel | Miguel Kafie Parada | Revolutionary Party of Democratic Unification |
| San Miguel | Manuel Antonio Ortiz | Revolutionary Party of Democratic Unification |
| San Miguel | Luis Galileo Fernández | Revolutionary Party of Democratic Unification |
| San Miguel | Rosa Amelia Guzmán | Revolutionary Party of Democratic Unification |

== Bibliography ==
- Political Handbook of the world, 1956. New York, 1957.
- Benítez Manaut, Raúl. 1990. "El Salvador: un equilibrio imperfecto entre los votos y las botas." Secuencia 17:71-92 (mayo-agosto de 1990).
- Institute for the Comparative Study of Political Systems. 1967. El Salvador election factbook, March 5, 1967. Washington: Institute for the Comparative Study of Political Systems.
- Ruddle, Kenneth. 1972. Latin American political statistics. supplement to the statistical abstract of Latin America. Los Angeles: Latin American Center, UCLA.
- Williams, Philip J. and Knut Walter. 1997. Militarization and demilitarization in El Salvador's transition to democracy. Pittsburgh: University of Pittsburgh Press.
