= 1954 Salvadoran legislative election =

- March 1954
- All 54 seats in the Legislative Assembly; 28 seats needed for a majority
| Party | Leader | Seats | +/– |
|---|---|---|---|
| PRUD | Óscar Osorio | 54 | 0 |
This lists parties that won seats. See the complete results below.
Results by constituency
| President of the Legislative Assembly before | President of the Legislative Assembly after |
|---|---|
| José María Peralta Salazar; PRUD | José María Peralta Salazar; PRUD |

Legislative elections were held in El Salvador in March 1954. The result was a victory for the Revolutionary Party of Democratic Unification, which was the only party to contest the elections as the opposition Renovating Action Party claimed that they were rigged.

== Results ==
| Party | Seats | +/– |
|---|---|---|
| Revolutionary Party of Democratic Unification | 54 | 0 |
| Total | 54 | 0 |
Source: Nohlen

== Elected Members ==
| Department | Deputy | Political affiliation |
|---|---|---|
| San Salvador | Jorge Horacio Villavicencio | Revolutionary Party of Democratic Unification |
| San Salvador | José María Peralta Salazar | Revolutionary Party of Democratic Unification |
| San Salvador | Juan Antonio Martínez | Revolutionary Party of Democratic Unification |
| San Salvador | Felipe Serafín Quiteño | Revolutionary Party of Democratic Unification |
| San Salvador | Amílcar Zepeda | Revolutionary Party of Democratic Unification |
| San Salvador | Rodolfo Quintanilla Meyer | Revolutionary Party of Democratic Unification |
| San Salvador | René Carmona Dárdano | Revolutionary Party of Democratic Unification |
| San Salvador | René Galindo | Revolutionary Party of Democratic Unification |
| Santa Ana | Luis Alonso Rendón | Revolutionary Party of Democratic Unification |
| Santa Ana | Raúl Cienfuegos | Revolutionary Party of Democratic Unification |
| Santa Ana | José Della Torre | Revolutionary Party of Democratic Unification |
| Santa Ana | Germán Giammattei | Revolutionary Party of Democratic Unification |
| Santa Ana | Juan Francisco Sánchez Zaldaña | Revolutionary Party of Democratic Unification |
| Santa Ana | Salvador Cañas | Revolutionary Party of Democratic Unification |
| Chalatenango | Luis Amado Alas | Revolutionary Party of Democratic Unification |
| Chalatenango | José Cándido Morales | Revolutionary Party of Democratic Unification |
| Chalatenango | Gonzalo Miranda Peña | Revolutionary Party of Democratic Unification |
| Sonsonate | Abraham Francisco Castillo Souza | Revolutionary Party of Democratic Unification |
| Sonsonate | Salvador Gómez Reyna | Revolutionary Party of Democratic Unification |
| Sonsonate | Benjamín Eladio Canjura | Revolutionary Party of Democratic Unification |
| Cuscatlán | Francisco Díaz Nuila | Revolutionary Party of Democratic Unification |
| Cuscatlán | José Rodríguez Rivas | Revolutionary Party of Democratic Unification |
| Cuscatlán | Filiberto Antonio Alfaro | Revolutionary Party of Democratic Unification |
| Ahuachapán | Manuel Alonso Rodríguez | Revolutionary Party of Democratic Unification |
| Ahuachapán | Federico Alonso Corleto | Revolutionary Party of Democratic Unification |
| Ahuachapán | Álvaro Alfredo Betancourt | Revolutionary Party of Democratic Unification |
| La Paz | Ricardo Rubio Velásquez | Revolutionary Party of Democratic Unification |
| La Paz | Jesús Mauricio Rodríguez | Revolutionary Party of Democratic Unification |
| La Paz | Miguel Ángel Ramírez Peña | Revolutionary Party of Democratic Unification |
| La Libertad | José Mauricio Mixco | Revolutionary Party of Democratic Unification |
| La Libertad | Godofredo Dubón | Revolutionary Party of Democratic Unification |
| La Libertad | Manuel Contreras López | Revolutionary Party of Democratic Unification |
| La Libertad | Rafael Antonio Iraheta | Revolutionary Party of Democratic Unification |
| Cabañas | Gustavo Jiménez Marenco | Revolutionary Party of Democratic Unification |
| Cabañas | Abraham Alfredo Amaya Ruiz | Revolutionary Party of Democratic Unification |
| La Unión | Adán Dolores Dheming | Revolutionary Party of Democratic Unification |
| La Unión | Francisco Ventura Zelaya | Revolutionary Party of Democratic Unification |
| La Unión | Julio Othon Rank | Revolutionary Party of Democratic Unification |
| San Vicente | Miguel Tomás López | Revolutionary Party of Democratic Unification |
| San Vicente | Felipe Baltasar Carballo | Revolutionary Party of Democratic Unification |
| San Vicente | Manuel Rafael Reyes | Revolutionary Party of Democratic Unification |
| Morazán | Manuel Laínez Rubio | Revolutionary Party of Democratic Unification |
| Morazán | José Nolasco | Revolutionary Party of Democratic Unification |
| Morazán | Silvano Antonio Sánchez | Revolutionary Party of Democratic Unification |
| Usulután | Atilio Ramírez Amaya | Revolutionary Party of Democratic Unification |
| Usulután | Rosendo Aguilar Chavarría | Revolutionary Party of Democratic Unification |
| Usulután | Adrián Ortiz | Revolutionary Party of Democratic Unification |
| Usulután | José Abel Laguardia | Revolutionary Party of Democratic Unification |
| Usulután | Héctor Archer Milla | Revolutionary Party of Democratic Unification |
| San Miguel | Jesús Urquilla Bernabel | Revolutionary Party of Democratic Unification |
| San Miguel | Colombo Rosales | Revolutionary Party of Democratic Unification |
| San Miguel | Luis Escobar Argueta | Revolutionary Party of Democratic Unification |
| San Miguel | Manuel Atilio Guandique | Revolutionary Party of Democratic Unification |
| San Miguel | José Ernesto Benedetto | Revolutionary Party of Democratic Unification |

== Bibliography ==
- Political Handbook of the world, 1954. New York, 1955.
- Benítez Manaut, Raúl. 1990. "El Salvador: un equilibrio imperfecto entre los votos y las botas." Secuencia 17:71-92 (mayo-agosto de 1990).
- Institute for the Comparative Study of Political Systems. 1967. El Salvador election factbook, March 5, 1967. Washington: Institute for the Comparative Study of Political Systems.
