= Alberto Armando Romero Rodríguez =

Salvadoran politician

Deputy of the Legislative Assembly of El Salvador from Cuscatlán
- In office 1 May 2006 – 1 May 2024

Personal details
- Born: 29 August 1964 (age 61) Cojutepeque, El Salvador
- Party: Nationalist Republican Alliance

Alberto Armando Romero Rodríguez (born 29 August 1964) is a Salvadoran politician from the Nationalist Republican Alliance.

== Career ==
In September 2022, the Salvadoran Congress withdrew his constitutional immunity. He stood down at the 2024 Salvadoran legislative election.

== See also ==
- List of members of the XIII Legislative Assembly of El Salvador
