= Margarita Escobar =

Salvadoran politician

Deputy of the Legislative Assembly of El Salvador from San Salvador
- In office 1 May 2009 – 1 May 2024

Personal details
- Party: Nationalist Republican Alliance

Ana María Margarita Escobar López is a Salvadoran politician from the Nationalist Republican Alliance.

== Career ==
She stood down during the 2024 Salvadoran legislative election.

== See also ==
- List of members of the XIII Legislative Assembly of El Salvador
