= Ana Orellana =

Salvadoran doctor and politician

Minister of Health of El Salvador
- In office 1 June 2019 – 27 March 2020
- President: Nayib Bukele
- Preceded by: Violeta Menjívar
- Succeeded by: Francisco Alabi

Personal details
- Education: Evangelical University of El Salvador

Ana del Carmen Orellana Bendek is a Salvadoran medical doctor, medical trade unionist and politician. She served as Minister of Health of El Salvador between 2019 and 2020.

== Career ==
Orellana graduated in 1992 from the Evangelical University of El Salvador, obtained a postgraduate qualification in HIV and AIDS prevention, and completed diploma courses in the prevention of congenital diseases and primary healthcare. She has worked as a resident doctor at the San Vicente National Hospital.

Orellana headed the Jayaque Health Unit and also worked at the San Martín Social Security community clinic. She was also a representative on the Public Services International's Health Committee for Central America, Mexico and the Dominican Republic.

She has been a medical trade unionist, taking part in marches against the privatisation of healthcare and serving as general secretary of the Union of Medical Workers of the Salvadoran Social Security Institute between 2009 and 2010, a union of which she is a co-founder.

=== Minister of Health (2019–2020) ===
On 27 May 2019, newly elected President of El Salvador Nayib Bukele announced in a statement through Twitter that Orellana would be the new Minister of Health, emphasising that she is "a staunch advocate for the right to healthcare for all Salvadorans". She was sworn in on 1 June 2019.

In September 2019, Orellana witnessed the demolition of the old Maternity Hospital, stating that the new Rosales Hospital Complex would be built on the site. That month, she also announced that the shortage of cancer drugs had been resolved, stating that they were "guaranteeing 100% of the supply".

On 19 February 2020 Orellana chaired the meeting of the Expanded Health Cabinet to review international health protocols in response to the COVID-19 epidemic. She announced that there were no confirmed cases in the country, that security protocols had been activated at El Salvador International Airport, and assessed the measures under the government's preventive plan.

In early March 2020, despite the fact that El Salvador had not yet reported any COVID-19 cases, Orellana sent a letter to the Cuban ambassador initially requesting 3,000 doses of the drug Interferon alfa-2b to combat the virus. On 12 March Orellana stated that children, pregnant women and those aged 60 or over would not be required to undergo a 30-day quarantine following the decree approved on 11 March regarding border closures and the suspension of classes. She approved the decree issued on 21 May imposing a nationwide lockdown.

Orellana was succeeded on 27 May 2020 by her deputy vice minister Francisco Alabi. The reasons for her dismissal were not disclosed, but in the days leading up to it, Alabi had taken on a more active and visible role in the handling of the pandemic.

In September 2020, she was investigated by the Government Ethics Tribunal over the purchase of a batch of 800.000 face masks from a company owned by the family of deputy Gustavo Escalante.
