= 1952 Salvadoran legislative election =

- March 1952
- All 54 seats in the Legislative Assembly; 28 seats needed for a majority
Party	Leader	Vote %	Seats	+/–
PRUD	Óscar Osorio	100	54	+16
This lists parties that won seats. See the complete results below.
Results by constituency
President of the Legislative Assembly before	President of the Legislative Assembly after
José María Peralta Salazar; PRUD	José María Peralta Salazar; PRUD

Legislative elections were held in El Salvador in March 1952. The result was a victory for the Revolutionary Party of Democratic Unification, which was the only party to contest the elections as the opposition Renovating Action Party claimed that they were rigged.

== Results ==
Party	Votes	%	Seats	+/–
Revolutionary Party of Democratic Unification	700,979	100.00	54	+16
Total	700,979	100.00	54	+2
Source: Nohlen

== Elected Members ==
Department	Deputy	Political affiliation
San Salvador	Jorge Horacio Villavicencio	Revolutionary Party of Democratic Unification
San Salvador	José María Peralta Salazar	Revolutionary Party of Democratic Unification
San Salvador	Juan Antonio Martínez	Revolutionary Party of Democratic Unification
San Salvador	Felipe Serafín Quiteño	Revolutionary Party of Democratic Unification
San Salvador	Amílcar Zepeda	Revolutionary Party of Democratic Unification
San Salvador	Rodolfo Quintanilla Meyer	Revolutionary Party of Democratic Unification
San Salvador	René Carmona Dárdano	Revolutionary Party of Democratic Unification
San Salvador	José Tomás Mariano Cáceres	Revolutionary Party of Democratic Unification
Santa Ana	Juan José Baños Rodríguez	Revolutionary Party of Democratic Unification
Santa Ana	Salomón Alberto Duarte	Revolutionary Party of Democratic Unification
Santa Ana	José Della Torre	Revolutionary Party of Democratic Unification
Santa Ana	Carlos Manuel Lemus	Revolutionary Party of Democratic Unification
Santa Ana	Herbert Martínez	Revolutionary Party of Democratic Unification
Santa Ana	Adrián Edmundo Gabriel Molina	Revolutionary Party of Democratic Unification
Chalatenango	Luis Amado Alas	Revolutionary Party of Democratic Unification
Chalatenango	José Cándido Morales	Revolutionary Party of Democratic Unification
Chalatenango	Jorge de Jesús Alvergue	Revolutionary Party of Democratic Unification
Sonsonate	Rubén Alonso Rodríguez	Revolutionary Party of Democratic Unification
Sonsonate	Salvador Gómez Reyna	Revolutionary Party of Democratic Unification
Sonsonate	Benjamín Eladio Canjura	Revolutionary Party of Democratic Unification
Cuscatlán	Francisco Díaz Nuila	Revolutionary Party of Democratic Unification
Cuscatlán	Víctor Manuel Martínez	Revolutionary Party of Democratic Unification
Cuscatlán	Filiberto Antonio Alfaro	Revolutionary Party of Democratic Unification
Ahuachapán	Manuel Alonso Rodríguez	Revolutionary Party of Democratic Unification
Ahuachapán	Rafael Antonio Morán	Revolutionary Party of Democratic Unification
Ahuachapán	Álvaro Alfredo Betancourt	Revolutionary Party of Democratic Unification
La Paz	Ricardo Rubio Velásquez	Revolutionary Party of Democratic Unification
La Paz	Jesús Mauricio Rodríguez	Revolutionary Party of Democratic Unification
La Paz	Miguel Ángel Ramírez Peña	Revolutionary Party of Democratic Unification
La Libertad	Baltazar Polio	Revolutionary Party of Democratic Unification
La Libertad	Luis Mendoza	Revolutionary Party of Democratic Unification
La Libertad	Manuel Contreras López	Revolutionary Party of Democratic Unification
La Libertad	Rafael Antonio Iraheta	Revolutionary Party of Democratic Unification
Cabañas	Gustavo Jiménez Marenco	Revolutionary Party of Democratic Unification
Cabañas	Abraham Alfredo Amaya Ruiz	Revolutionary Party of Democratic Unification
La Unión	Adán Dolores Dheming	Revolutionary Party of Democratic Unification
La Unión	Héctor Manuel Gutiérrez	Revolutionary Party of Democratic Unification
La Unión	Pablo Antonio Ventura	Revolutionary Party of Democratic Unification
San Vicente	Florentino Ruperto Romero	Revolutionary Party of Democratic Unification
San Vicente	Felipe Baltasar Carballo	Revolutionary Party of Democratic Unification
San Vicente	Manuel Rafael Reyes	Revolutionary Party of Democratic Unification
Morazán	Manuel Laínez Rubio	Revolutionary Party of Democratic Unification
Morazán	Juan Francisco González	Revolutionary Party of Democratic Unification
Morazán	Silvano Antonio Sánchez	Revolutionary Party of Democratic Unification
Usulután	Atilio Ramírez Amaya	Revolutionary Party of Democratic Unification
Usulután	José Amadeo Cedillos	Revolutionary Party of Democratic Unification
Usulután	Adrián Ortiz	Revolutionary Party of Democratic Unification
Usulután	José Antonio Munguía	Revolutionary Party of Democratic Unification
Usulután	Héctor Archer Milla	Revolutionary Party of Democratic Unification
San Miguel	Jesús Urquilla Bernabel	Revolutionary Party of Democratic Unification
San Miguel	Colombo Rosales	Revolutionary Party of Democratic Unification
San Miguel	Manuel de Jesús Pérez	Revolutionary Party of Democratic Unification
San Miguel	Manuel Atilio Guandique	Revolutionary Party of Democratic Unification
San Miguel	José Ernesto Benedetto	Revolutionary Party of Democratic Unification

== Bibliography ==
- Political Handbook of the world, 1952. New York, 1953.
- Benítez Manaut, Raúl. 1990. "El Salvador: un equilibrio imperfecto entre los votos y las botas." Secuencia 17:71-92 (mayo-agosto de 1990).
- Institute for the Comparative Study of Political Systems. 1967. El Salvador election factbook, March 5, 1967. Washington: Institute for the Comparative Study of Political Systems.
- Williams, Philip J. and Knut Walter. 1997. Militarization and demilitarization in El Salvador's transition to democracy. Pittsburgh: University of Pittsburgh Press.
