= José Javier Palomo Nieto =

Salvadoran politician

Deputy of the Legislative Assembly of El Salvador from Santa Ana
- In office 1 May 2015 – 1 May 2024

Personal details
- Born: 23 April 1975 (age 50)
- Party: Nationalist Republican Alliance

José Javier Palomo Nieto (born 23 April 1975) is a Salvadoran politician from the Nationalist Republican Alliance.

== Career ==
He stood down during the 2024 Salvadoran legislative election.

== See also ==
- List of members of the XIII Legislative Assembly of El Salvador
