= 1958 Salvadoran legislative election =

- 23 March 1958
- All 54 seats in the Legislative Assembly; 28 seats needed for a majority
Party	Leader	Vote %	Seats	+/–
PRUD	José Lemus	100	54	0
This lists parties that won seats. See the complete results below.
Results by constituency
President of the Legislative Assembly before	President of the Legislative Assembly after
René Carmona Dárdano; PRUD	Víctor Manuel Esquivel Rodríguez; PRUD

Legislative elections were held in El Salvador on 23 March 1958. The result was a victory for the Revolutionary Party of Democratic Unification, which won all 54 seats unopposed after opposition candidates withdrew from the elections.

== Results ==
Party	Votes	%	Seats	+/–
Revolutionary Party of Democratic Unification	450,000	100.00	54	0
Total	450,000	100.00	54	0
Source: Nohlen

== Elected Members ==
Department	Deputy	Political affiliation
San Salvador	Carlos Zepeda	Revolutionary Party of Democratic Unification
San Salvador	Víctor Manuel Esquivel Rodríguez	Revolutionary Party of Democratic Unification
San Salvador	Samuel Antonio Castro	Revolutionary Party of Democratic Unification
San Salvador	Edgardo Guerra Hinds	Revolutionary Party of Democratic Unification
San Salvador	Enrique González Castro	Revolutionary Party of Democratic Unification
San Salvador	Francisco Valladares Velis	Revolutionary Party of Democratic Unification
San Salvador	Julio Suvillaga Zaldívar	Revolutionary Party of Democratic Unification
San Salvador	Blanca Ávalos de Méndez	Revolutionary Party of Democratic Unification
Santa Ana	Mario Castro Bethencourt	Revolutionary Party of Democratic Unification
Santa Ana	Jorge Hernández Colocho	Revolutionary Party of Democratic Unification
Santa Ana	Alfonso Simón Batlle	Revolutionary Party of Democratic Unification
Santa Ana	Raúl Méndez Flores	Revolutionary Party of Democratic Unification
Santa Ana	Rafael Avilés Villalta	Revolutionary Party of Democratic Unification
Santa Ana	Roberto Aguilar Guido	Revolutionary Party of Democratic Unification
Chalatenango	Carlos Serrano García	Revolutionary Party of Democratic Unification
Chalatenango	Luis Ángel Romagoza	Revolutionary Party of Democratic Unification
Chalatenango	Francisco Herbert Ayala	Revolutionary Party of Democratic Unification
Sonsonate	Sidney Mazzini Villacorta	Revolutionary Party of Democratic Unification
Sonsonate	Mauricio Eladio Castillo	Revolutionary Party of Democratic Unification
Sonsonate	Alfonso Trigueros Alcaine	Revolutionary Party of Democratic Unification
Cuscatlán	Rafael Aráuz Rodríguez	Revolutionary Party of Democratic Unification
Cuscatlán	César Buitrago	Revolutionary Party of Democratic Unification
Cuscatlán	Mariano Martínez Calderón	Revolutionary Party of Democratic Unification
Ahuachapán	Gilberto Sergio Calderón	Revolutionary Party of Democratic Unification
Ahuachapán	Alfonso Onofre Salaverría	Revolutionary Party of Democratic Unification
Ahuachapán	Miguel Méndez Salazar	Revolutionary Party of Democratic Unification
La Paz	José Ochoa Gómez	Revolutionary Party of Democratic Unification
La Paz	Óscar René Salegio	Revolutionary Party of Democratic Unification
La Paz	Antonia Portillo de Galindo	Revolutionary Party of Democratic Unification
La Libertad	Rafael Cabrera Martínez	Revolutionary Party of Democratic Unification
La Libertad	Arturo Argumedo	Revolutionary Party of Democratic Unification
La Libertad	Joaquín Castro Canizales	Revolutionary Party of Democratic Unification
La Libertad	Mario Harrison Morales	Revolutionary Party of Democratic Unification
Cabañas	Sotero Adalberto Orellana	Revolutionary Party of Democratic Unification
Cabañas	José Eduardo Morales	Revolutionary Party of Democratic Unification
La Unión	Miguel Ángel Molina	Revolutionary Party of Democratic Unification
La Unión	Carlos González Ansaldo	Revolutionary Party of Democratic Unification
La Unión	Luis Alonso Sánchez	Revolutionary Party of Democratic Unification
San Vicente	Jesús Méndez Barahona	Revolutionary Party of Democratic Unification
San Vicente	Gregorio Alfredo Funes	Revolutionary Party of Democratic Unification
San Vicente	Ricardo Martelli	Revolutionary Party of Democratic Unification
Morazán	Esteban Laínez Rubio	Revolutionary Party of Democratic Unification
Morazán	Armando Peña Quezada	Revolutionary Party of Democratic Unification
Morazán	Ciro Hildebrando Umaña	Revolutionary Party of Democratic Unification
Usulután	José de La Paz Gavidia	Revolutionary Party of Democratic Unification
Usulután	Luis Felipe Hidalgo	Revolutionary Party of Democratic Unification
Usulután	Carlos Alberto Aguilar Chavarría	Revolutionary Party of Democratic Unification
Usulután	Belarmino Laguardia	Revolutionary Party of Democratic Unification
Usulután	José Ferreiro	Revolutionary Party of Democratic Unification
San Miguel	Pedro Urquilla Espínola	Revolutionary Party of Democratic Unification
San Miguel	José Gabriel Laínez	Revolutionary Party of Democratic Unification
San Miguel	Fidel Rodríguez Quintanilla	Revolutionary Party of Democratic Unification
San Miguel	Manuel Antonio Ortiz	Revolutionary Party of Democratic Unification
San Miguel	Francisco José Alvarado	Revolutionary Party of Democratic Unification

== Bibliography ==
- Political Handbook of the world, 1958. New York, 1959.
- Eguizábal, Cristina. 1984. "El Salvador: elecciones sin democracia." Polemica (Costa Rica) 14/15:16-33 (marzo-junio 1984).
- Institute for the Comparative Study of Political Systems. 1967. El Salvador election factbook, March 5, 1967. Washington: Institute for the Comparative Study of Political Systems.
- Ruddle, Kenneth. 1972. Latin American political statistics. supplement to the statistical abstract of Latin America. Los Angeles: Latin American Center, UCLA.
