= Alexia Rivas =

Salvadoran politician

Second Vice President of the Legislative Assembly of El Salvador
- Incumbent
- Assumed office 6 June 2024
- President: Ernesto Castro
- Preceded by: Rodrigo Ayala

Deputy of the Legislative Assembly of El Salvador from San Salvador
- Incumbent
- Assumed office 1 May 2021

Personal details
- Born: Katheryn Alexia Rivas González
- Party: Nuevas Ideas
- Education: University of El Salvador
- Occupation: Politician

Katheryn Alexia Rivas González is a Salvadoran politician. She has served as the Second Vice President of the Legislative Assembly of El Salvador since 2024.

== Education ==
Rivas earned a degree in international relations from the University of El Salvador, where she also received a diploma in political economy in 2013. She is currently pursuing a bachelor’s degree in legal studies at the Panamerican University of El Salvador.

== Career ==
Professionally, she has worked in the private sector since 2015, and from 2019 to 2021 she served as the international affairs coordinator at the Ministry of Health’s Office of International Relations and Health Cooperation.

In the 2021 legislative election, Rivas got elected member of the Legislative Assembly for Nuevas Ideas party representing San Salvador Department. Rivas chaired the Woman and Gender Equality Committee. She got re-elected in the 2024 legislative election. She is member of the National Security and Justice and Political Committees.

On 6 June 2024 Rivas was elected and sworn in Second Vice President of the Legislative Assembly, to succeed Rodrigo Ayala.

On 28 June 2026, Rivas announced she will seek re-election as candidate of Salvadoran diaspora.
