= Numan Salgado =

Salvadoran politician

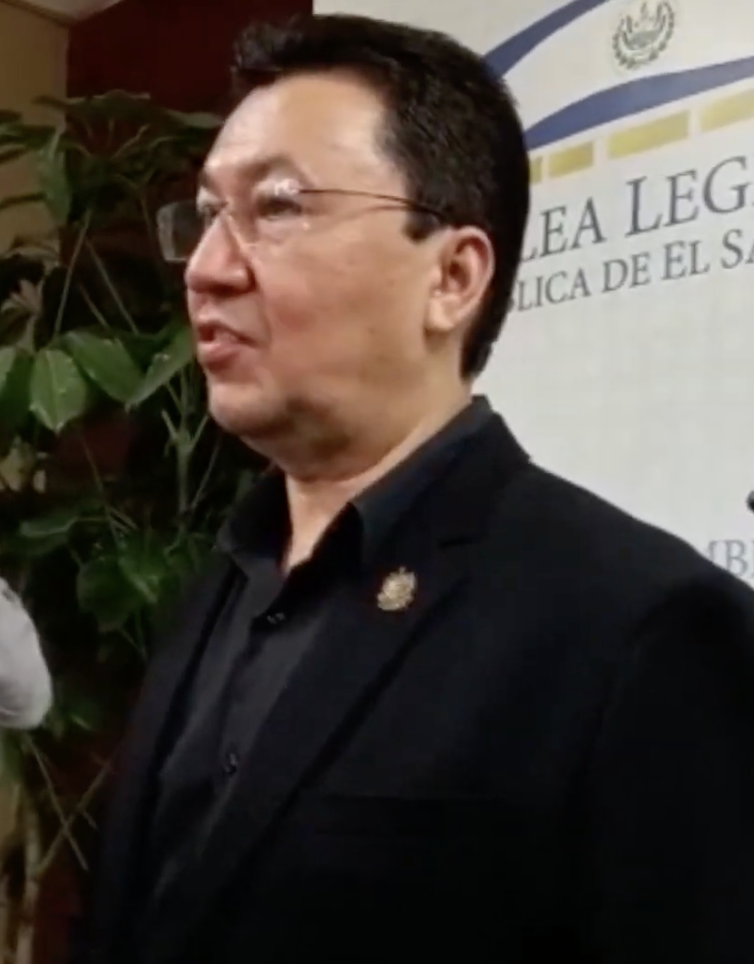
- Salgado in 2021

Deputy of the Legislative Assembly of El Salvador from San Miguel
- In office 1 May 2015 – 1 May 2024

Personal details
- Born: Numan Pompilio Salgado García; 11 January 1968 (age 58) El Salvador
- Party: Grand Alliance for National Unity
- Education: Captain General Gerardo Barrios Military School
- Occupation: Politician, lawyer, businessman

Numan Pompilio Salgado García (born 11 January 1968) is a Salvadoran politician, lawyer, and businessman who served as a deputy of the Legislative Assembly from 2015 to 2024. He also served as the first secretary of the Legislative Assembly from 2018 to 2021 and the second secretary from 2021 to 2024.

== Early life ==
Numan Pompilio Salgado García was born on 11 January 1968. He graduated from the Captain General Gerardo Barrios Military School as a bachelor in judicial sciences.

== Political career ==
During the 2012 legislative election, Salgado ran with the Grand Alliance for National Unity (GANA) seeking to be elected as a deputy to the Legislative Assembly, however, he was not elected.

During the 2015 legislative election, the Supreme Electoral Court suspended the candidacy of Sandra Salgado, his sister, as deputy to the Legislative Assembly. Salgado replaced his sister as one of GANA's candidate for deputy from San Miguel; Salgado was elected as a deputy. He was a member of the women and gender equality commission, the narrator of the foreign relations, Central American integration, and Salvadorans in the exterior commission, and the president of the youth and sport commission.

Salgado was re-elected in the 2018 legislative election. Salgado's supplement deputy was Gloria Elizabeth Gómez, his former sister-in-law. Salgado was the first secretary of the Legislative Assembly. He was also the narrator of the women and gender equality commission, the president of the foreign relations, Central American integration, and Salvadorans in the exterior commission, and the president of the youth and sport commission. In February 2020, Salgado defended President Nayib Bukele's ordering of 40 soldiers of the Salvadoran Armed Forces to enter the meeting room of the Legislative Assembly amidst a political stalemate regarding the approval of a US$109 million loan to fund his Territorial Control Plan.

Salgado was re-elected in the 2021 legislative election. Salgado's supplement deputy was Karla Yuriko Salgado, his niece. On 1 May 2021, he was elected as the second secretary of the Legislative Assembly. That same day, he voted with the Nuevas Ideas supermajority in the Legislative Assembly to remove the 5 justices of the Supreme Court's Constitutional Court and remove Attorney General Raúl Melara. He was a member of the public works, transportation, and housing commission. On 8 June 2021, Salgado voted in favor of adopting the Bitcoin Law to make bitcoin legal tender in El Salvador.

Salgado sought re-election in the 2024 legislative election; Salgado lost re-election.

== Personal life ==
Salgado owns the company Salgado Brothers Commercial San Miguel.

Salgado has a sister, Sandra, and a brother, Wilfredo, who formerly served as the mayor of San Miguel.
