= Matilde Elena López =

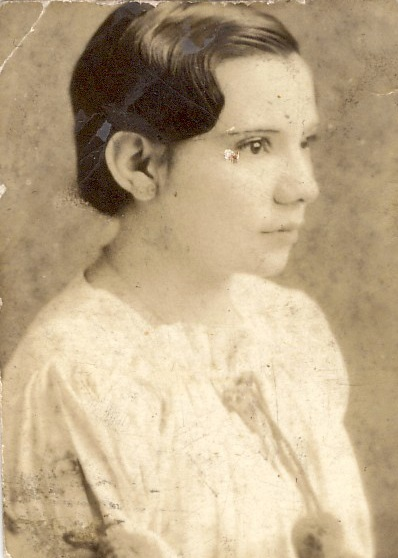
Inspired by the thought of Alberto Masferer. A pioneer of the Salvadoran essay, she is considered one of the figures of the Central American intelligentsia of the 20th century, she developed extensive literary work in favor of women's rights.

Matilde Elena López (20 February 1919 – 11 March 2010) was a Salvadoran poet, essayist, playwright and literary critic. Her most important works include “Masferrer, alto pensador de Centro América”, “Cartas a Grosa” and “La balada de Anastasio Aquino”.

During the 1940s she was part of the League of Anti-Fascist Writers, a group of young writers with leftist ideas. In April 1944, she participated in the popular movement that sought to overthrow the government of dictator Maximiliano Hernández Martínez. She studied at the University of San Carlos de Guatemala and the Universidad Central del Ecuador, and at from latter University she received a doctorate degree in philosophy.

In 1958 she joined the University of El Salvador where she worked as professor, director of the Department of Arts and Vice Dean of the Faculty of Humanities. She has also taught at the Universidad Centroamericana "Jose Simeon Cañas". Her 1978 play, The Ballad of Anastasio Aquino is dedicated to the Salvadoran indigenous leader Anastasio Aquino.

From 1997 until her death she was a member of the Academia Salvadoreña de la Lengua.

== Notable works ==
- Masferrer, alto pensador de Centroamérica (essay, 1954),
- Interpretación social del arte (essay, 1965),
- Dante, poeta y ciudadano del futuro (essay, 1965),
- Estudio-prólogo a las Obras escogidas de Alberto Masferrer (1971),
- Estudio-prólogo a las Obras escogidas de Claudia Lars (1973),
- Estudios sobre poesía (essay, 1973),
- La balada de Anastasio Aquino (play, 1978),
- Los sollozos oscuros (poetry, 1982),
- El verbo amar (poetry, 1997)
- Ensayos literarios (1998).
