= Suecy Callejas =

Salvadoran lawyer and politician

Suecy Callejas Estrada
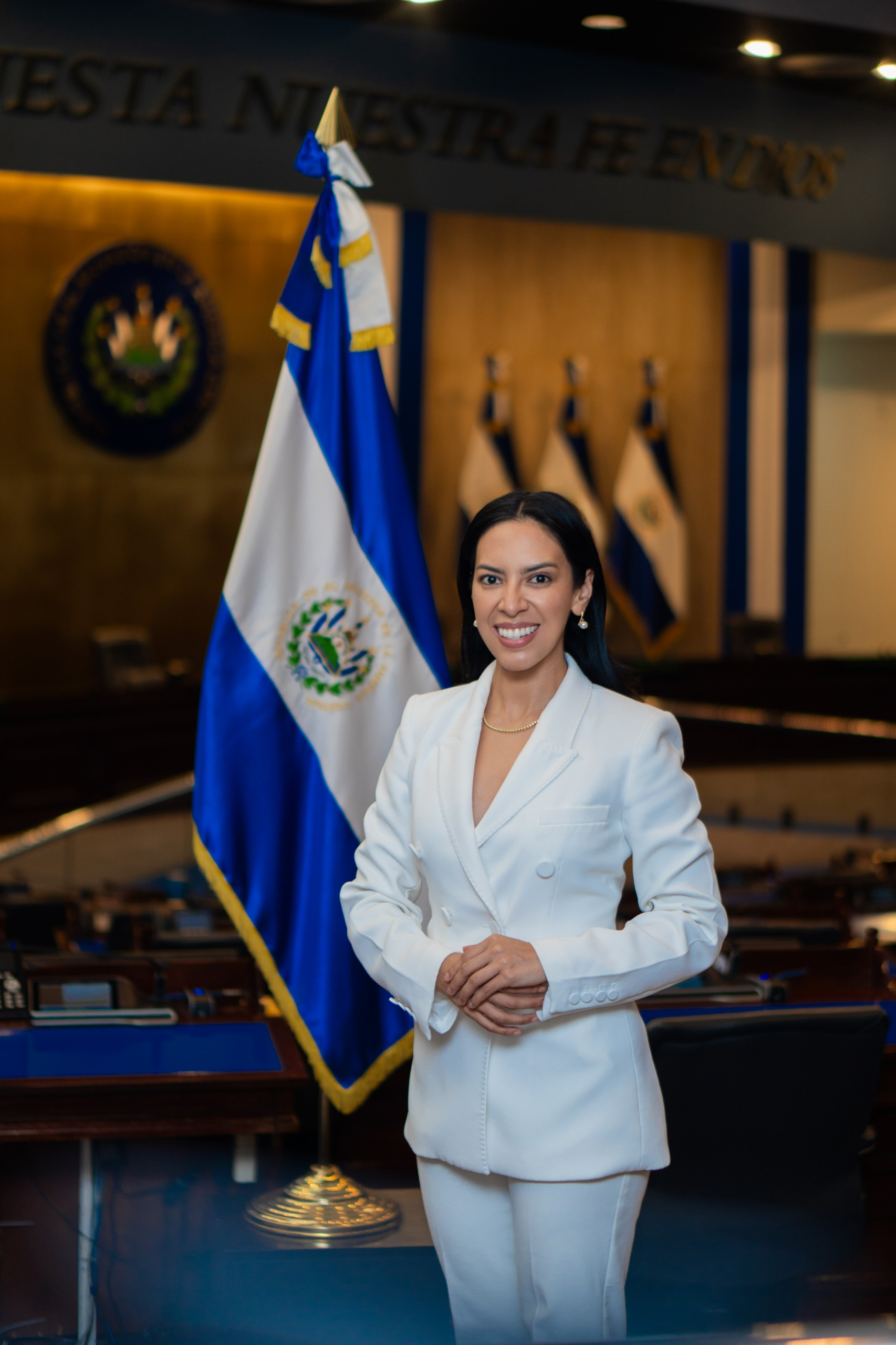

First Vice President of the Legislative Assembly of El Salvador
- Incumbent
- Assumed office 1 May 2021
- Preceded by: Serafín Orantes

Deputy of the Legislative Assembly of El Salvador from San Salvador
- Incumbent
- Assumed office 1 May 2021

Minister of Culture of El Salvador
- In office 1 June 2019 – 1 November 2020
- President: Nayib Bukele
- Preceded by: Silvia Regalado
- Succeeded by: Mariemm Pleitez

Personal details
- Born: Suecy Beverly Callejas Estrada
- Party: Nuevas Ideas
- Occupation: Politician, lawyer

Suecy Beverly Callejas Estrada is a Salvadoran lawyer and politician who currently serves as the first vice president of the Legislative Assembly of El Salvador. She was Minister of Culture from 1 June 2019 to 1 November 2020. She is a member of the Nuevas Ideas political party.

== Background and education ==
She studied modern dance at the Instituto Superior de Arte in Havana, Cuba and had a previous career as a dancer and dance teacher.

== Political career ==
On 1 June 2019, she was appointed by Nayib Bukele as his minister of culture. On 1 May 2021, she became a member of the Legislative Assembly for San Salvador and was elected as the assembly's first vice president. She won re-election during the 2024 legislative election. She is considered a close ally of Bukele. As a member of the assembly, she has supported legislation to remove income taxes for money originating abroad, a measure intended to increase foreign investment.
