= Revolutionary Party of Democratic Unification =

The Revolutionary Party of Democratic Unification (Spanish: Partido Revolucionario de Unificación Democrática) was the ruling party in El Salvador during the 1950s and early 1960s.

== History ==
The party was established 1945 as the official party of the military rulers. In the 1950 general elections, its candidate Óscar Osorio won the presidential elections, whilst the party won 38 of the 52 seats in the Constitutional Assembly. It was the only party to contest the 1952 and 1954 legislative elections. In the 1956 presidential elections several opposition candidates were barred from standing by the Central Elections Council, allowing its candidate, José María Lemus, to win with over 95% of the vote. In the legislative elections that year it again won all 54 seats, despite facing opposition from the National Action Party.

The party won the 1958 legislative elections unopposed, and again won all 54 seats in the 1960 elections despite the NAP running again.

== Electoral history ==
=== Presidential elections ===
Election	Candidate	Votes	%	Pos.	Result	Ref.
1950	Óscar Osorio	345,139	56.45%	▲1st	Elected ✓	
1956	José María Lemus	677,748	95.20%	1st	Elected ✓	

=== Legislative Assembly elections ===
Election	Votes	%	Position	Seats	+/–	Status in legislature	Ref.
1950	345,139	56.45	▲1st	38 / 52	New	Supermajority government	
1952	700,979	100.00	1st	54 / 54	▲16	Supermajority government	
1954		100.00	1st	54 / 54	0	Supermajority government	
1956	552,000	94.36	1st	54 / 54	0	Supermajority government	
1958	450,000	100.00	1st	54 / 54	0	Supermajority government	
1958	368,545	87.73	1st	54 / 54	0	Supermajority government	
