= Reynaldo Cardoza =

Salvadoran politician

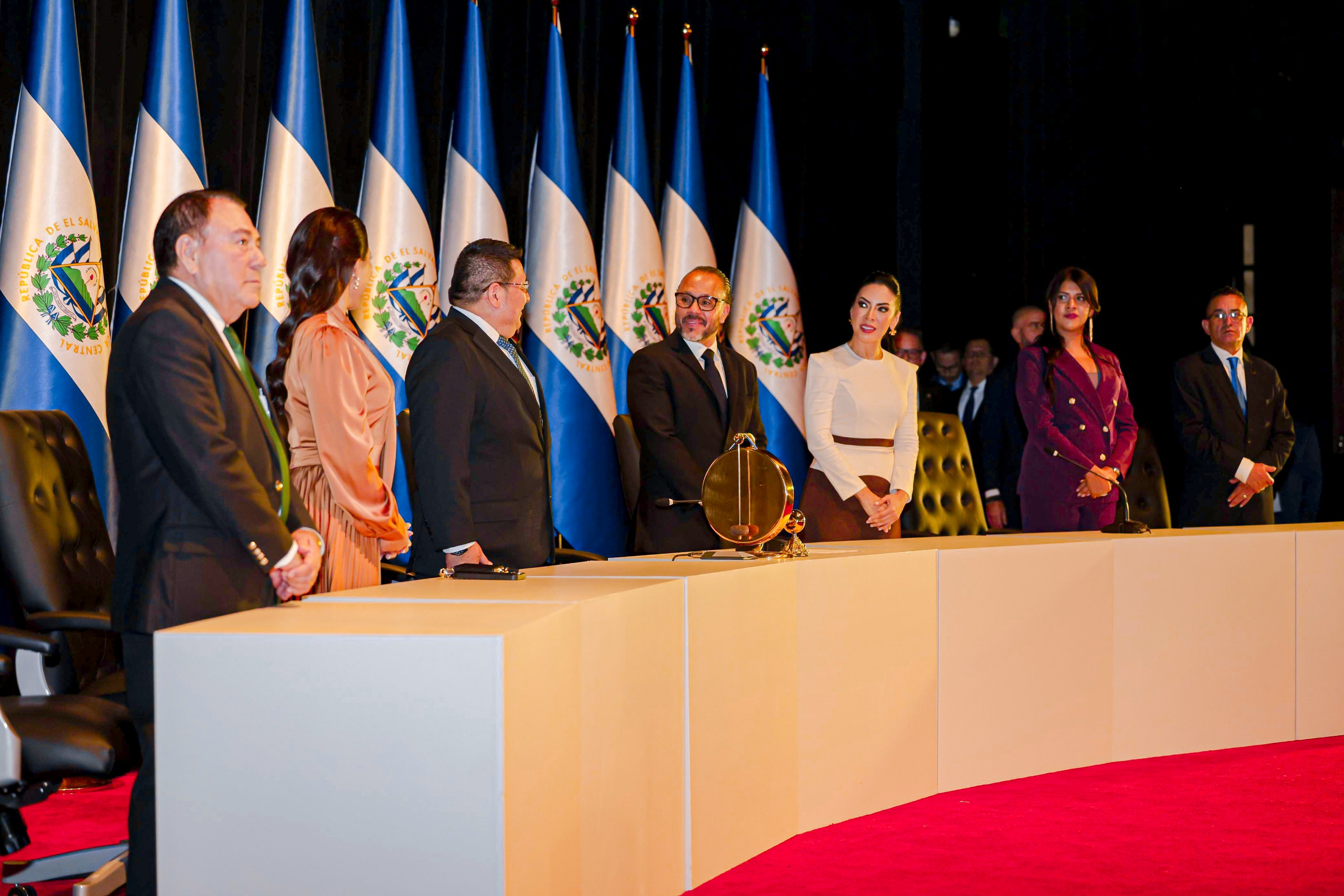
- Cardoza (far-right) in 2025

Deputy of the Legislative Assembly of El Salvador from Chalatenango
- Incumbent
- Assumed office 1 May 2009

Personal details
- Born: Reynaldo Antonio López Cardoza; 30 May 1975 (age 51) Dulce Nombre de María, El Salvador
- Party: National Coalition Party
- Spouse: Alma Yaneth Gutiérrez de López
- Occupation: Politician

Reynaldo Antonio López Cardoza (born 30 May 1975) is a Salvadoran politician who serves as a member of the Legislative Assembly of El Salvador. He served as the legislature's second secretary from 2024 to 2025.

== Early life ==
Reynaldo Antonio López Cardoza was born on 30 May 1975 in Dulce Nombre de María, El Salvador.

== Political career ==
In 2009, Cardoza became a deputy of the Legislative Assembly of El Salvador from the Chalatenango Department as a member of the National Coalition Party (PCN). Cardoza was a member of the directorial board of the AD Chalatenango association football team during the 2010s.

On 1 May 2024, Cardoza was elected as the second secretary of the Legislative Assembly for the first half of the 14th legislative term, after which he was succeeded by fellow PCN deputy Serafín Orantes. In 2025, Cardoza remarked that El Salvador was not "the world's prison" ("cárcel de todo el mundo"), in reference to the housing of prisoners from the United States in the Terrorism Confinement Center (CECOT).

Cardoza is seeking re-election in the 2027 legislative election.

== Legal troubles ==
During the 2010s, Cardoza allegedly helped finance the Texis Cartel.

In March 2017, the Office of the Attorney General (FGR) seized twelve of Cardoza's properties as well as five bank accounts. The FGR stated that they were not seized as a part of a criminal probe but rather to determine how Cardoza acquired the properties.

== Personal life ==
Cardoza is married to Alma Yaneth Gutiérrez de López.
