= Ministry of Health (El Salvador) =

Ministry of Public Health
- Ministerio de Salud
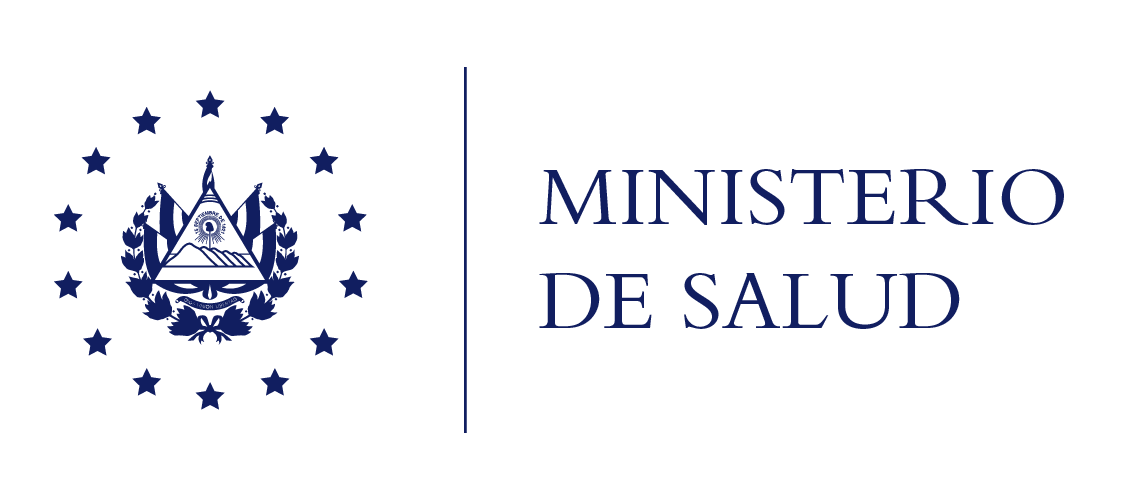

Agency overview
- Jurisdiction: El Salvador
- Headquarters: C. Arce 827, San Salvador, El Salvador
- Minister responsible: Francisco José Alabí Montoya
- Website: https://www.salud.gob.sv/

The Ministry of Health of El Salvador (Spanish: Ministerio de Salud) is a government ministry of El Salvador. The government agency is responsible for formulating and implementing national health policies, overseeing public health services, and ensuring the well-being of the population. Its functions include planning, directing, coordinating, and executing the government's public health policies.
