= Legislative Assembly of El Salvador =

Unicameral legislature of El Salvador

Coordinates: 13°42′22″N 89°11′58″W

Legislative Assembly Asamblea Legislativa
- XIV Legislative Assembly

Type
- Type: Unicameral

History
- Founded: 1824
- New session started: 1 May 2024

Leadership
- President: Ernesto Castro (Nuevas Ideas) since 1 May 2021
- First Vice President: Suecy Callejas (Nuevas Ideas) since 1 May 2021
- Second Vice President: Alexia Rivas (Nuevas Ideas) since 6 June 2024

Structure
- Seats: 60 deputies
- Political groups: Government (57): Nuevas Ideas (54); PCN (2); PDC (1); Opposition (3): ARENA (2); Vamos (1)
- Committees: 8
- Length of term: 3 years

Elections
- Last election: 4 February 2024
- Next election: 28 February 2027

Motto
- Puesta Nuestra Fe En Dios (English: We Put Our Faith In God)

Meeting place
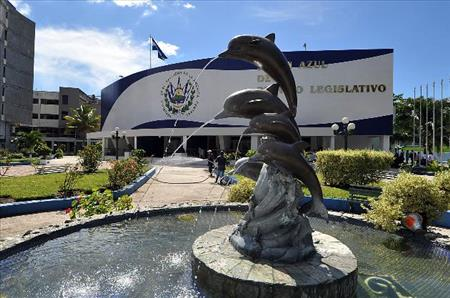
- Salon Azul, San Salvador

Website
- www.asamblea.gob.sv

Constitution
- Constitution of El Salvador

The Legislative Assembly (Spanish: Asamblea Legislativa) is the legislative branch of the government of El Salvador.

== History ==
The organization was founded in 1824 as the Central American Congress (Spanish: Congreso Federal Centroamericano). The 1824 constitution first established a bicameral legislature, including Senate. The 1880 constitution retained a bicameral legislature. The 1886 constitution introduced a unicameral legislature.

== Structure ==
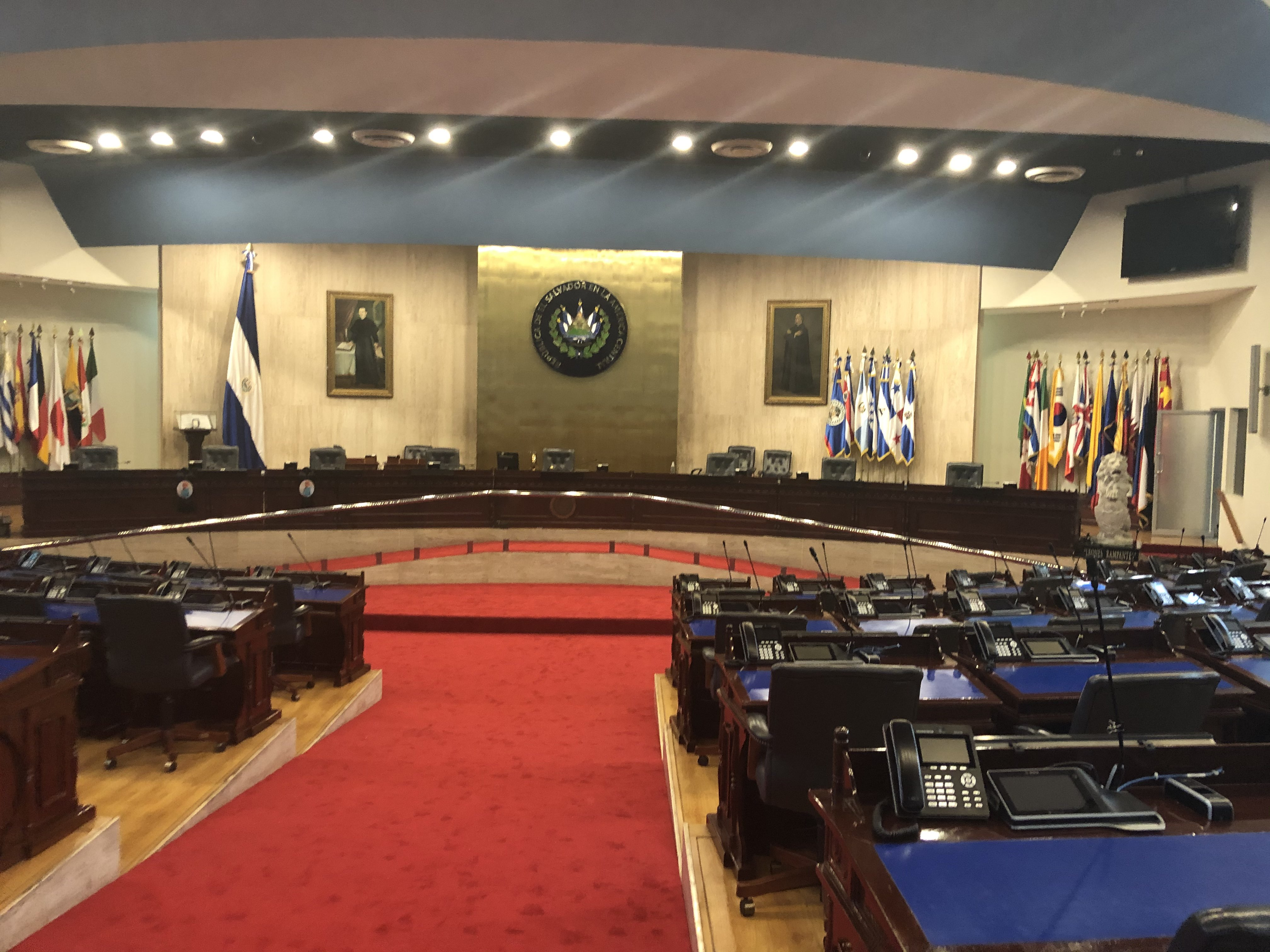
Blue Room of the Legislative Assembly of El Salvador.

The Salvadoran legislature is a unicameral body. Until 2024, it was made up of 84 deputies, all of whom are elected by direct popular vote according to open-list proportional representation to serve three-year terms and are eligible for immediate re-election. Of these, 64 were elected in 14 multi-seat constituencies, corresponding to the country's 14 departments, which return between 3 and 16 deputies each. The remaining 20 deputies were selected on the basis of a single national constituency.

To be eligible for election to the assembly, candidates must be (Art. 126, Constitution):

- over 25;
- Salvadoran citizens by birth, born of at least one parent to be a Salvadoran citizen;
- of recognised honesty and education, and
- have not had the privilege of one's rights as a citizen cancelled in the previous five years.

On 1 June 2023, Salvadoran president Nayib Bukele issued a proposal to the Legislative Assembly to reduce the number of its seats from 84 to 60. The proposal was passed by the Legislative Assembly on 7 June 2023 and went into effect on 1 May 2024.

== Current standing by party ==
Party	Ideology	Position	Deputies
Nuevas Ideas (NI)	Bukelism	Big tent	54
Nationalist Republican Alliance (ARENA)	Conservatism	Center-right to right-wing	2
National Coalition Party (PCN)	Conservatism	Center-right	2
Vamos (V)	Liberalism	Center	1
Christian Democratic Party (PDC)	Christian democracy	Center to center-left	1
Source: Legislative Assembly of El Salvador

== Current leadership ==
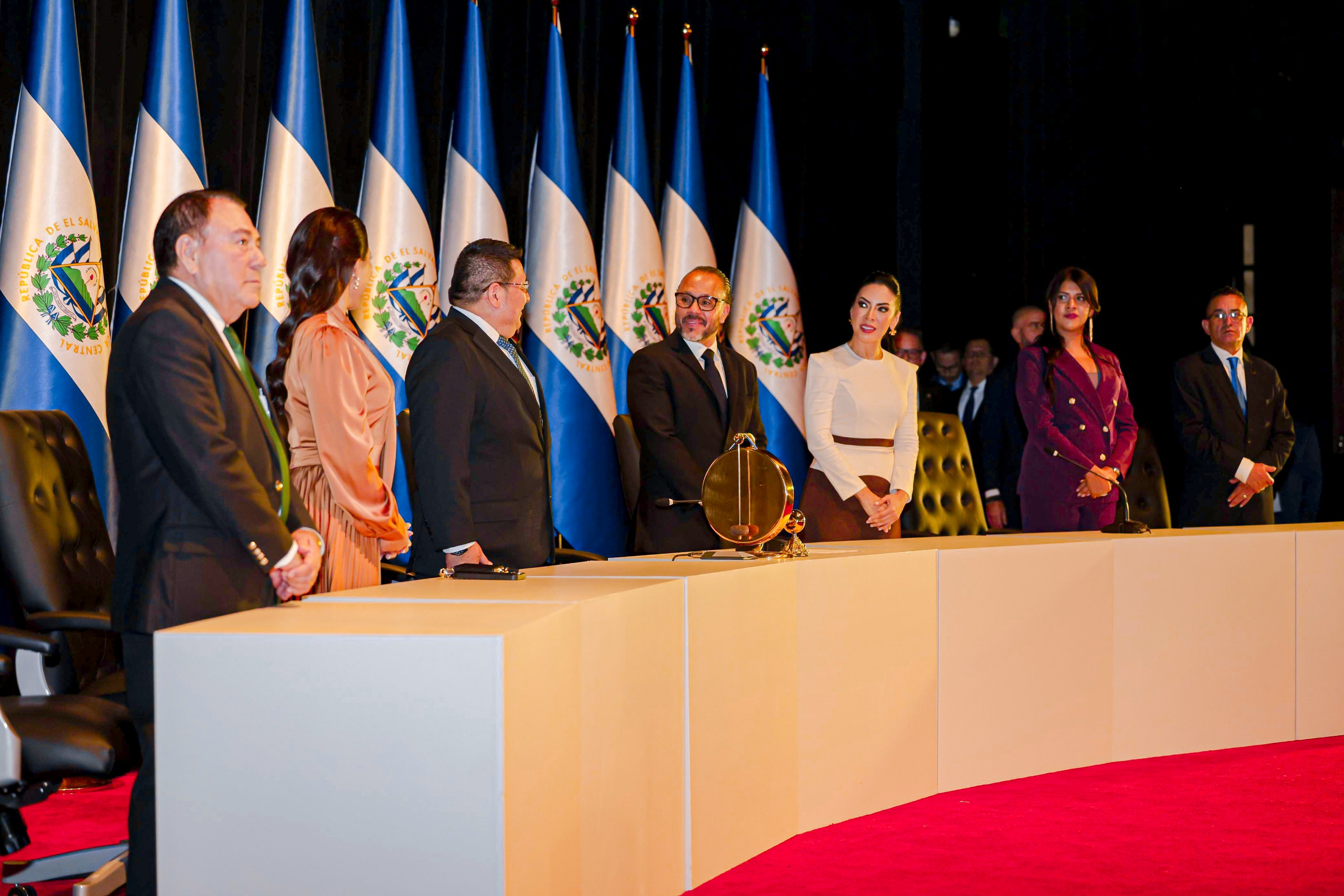
The leadership of the XIV Legislative Assembly

The following table displays the Legislative Assembly's leadership, which were elected on 1 May 2024.

Office	Holder	Political affiliation	Department	Term
President	Ernesto Castro	Nuevas Ideas	San Salvador	1 May 2024 – 1 May 2027
First Vice President	Suecy Callejas	Nuevas Ideas	San Salvador	1 May 2024 – 1 May 2027
Second Vice President	Rodrigo Ayala	Nuevas Ideas	San Salvador	1 May 2024 – 6 June 2024
Second Vice President	Alexia Rivas	Nuevas Ideas	San Salvador	6 June 2024 – 1 May 2027
First Secretary	Elisa Rosales	Nuevas Ideas	San Salvador	1 May 2024 – 1 May 2027
Second Secretary	Reynaldo Cardoza	National Coalition Party	Chalatenango	1 May 2024 – 1 November 2025
Second Secretary	Serafín Orantes	National Coalition Party	Ahuachapán	1 November 2025 – 1 May 2027
Third Secretary	Reinaldo Carballo	Christian Democratic Party	San Miguel	1 May 2024 – 1 May 2027

== Election results ==
=== Results ===
Party	Votes	%	Seats	+/–
Nuevas Ideas	2,200,332	70.56	54	–2
Nationalist Republican Alliance	227,357	7.29	2	–12
Farabundo Martí National Liberation Front	195,920	6.28	0	–4
National Coalition Party	101,641	3.26	2	–
Grand Alliance for National Unity	99,344	3.19	0	–5
Christian Democratic Party	93,108	2.99	1	–
Vamos	91,675	2.94	1	–
Solidary Force	51,021	1.64	0	New
Nuestro Tiempo	41,060	1.32	0	–1
Democratic Change	12,165	0.39	0	–
PDC–PCN	4,913	0.16	0	–
Total	3,118,536	100.00	60	–24
Valid votes	3,118,536	96.46		
Invalid votes	74,146	2.29		
Blank votes	40,208	1.24		
Total votes	3,232,890	100.00		
Registered voters/turnout	6,214,399	52.02		
Source: TSE

== Other parliamentary bodies ==
El Salvador also returns 20 deputies to the supranational Central American Parliament, also elected according to open-list proportional representation from a single national constituency.

== Members of the Legislative Assembly ==
Members of the Legislative Assembly 1928–present
Key to parties Authentic Democratic Christian Movement Christian Democratic Party Democratic Action Democratic Change Democratic Convergence Farabundo Martí National Liberation Front Grand Alliance for National Unity Grand Alliance for National Unity Liberal Democratic Party Movement of Unity National Action Party National Conciliation Party/National Coalition Party National Democratic Party National Pro Patria Party National Revolutionary Movement Nationalist Democratic Union Nationalist Republican Alliance Nuestro Tiempo Nuevas Ideas Renovating Action Party Revolutionary Party of Democratic Unification Salvadoran Authentic Institutional Party Salvadoran Popular Party Social Christian Renewal Party National Opposition Union United Democratic Center United Independent Democratic Front Vamos Independent politician
Election	Distribution
1928	42
1932	Election canceled
1936	42
1939	42
1944	42
1950	14 / 38
1952	54
1954	54
1956	54
1958	54
1960	54
1961	54
1964	14 / 6 / 32
1968	19 / 2 / 4 / 27
1970	16 / 1 / 1 / 34
1972	8 / 1 / 4 / 39
1974	15 / 1 / 36
1976	52
1978	4 / 50
1982	24 / 1 / 2 / 14 / 19
1985	33 / 1 / 1 / 12 / 13
1988	22 / 7 / 31
1991	22 / 1 / 1 / 8 / 9 / 39
1994	21 / 18 / 1 / 1 / 4 / 39
1997	27 / 10 / 1 / 2 / 2 / 3 / 11 / 28
2000	31 / 10 / 3 / 2 / 13 / 29
2003	31 / 5 / 5 / 16 / 27
2006	32 / 6 / 2 / 10 / 34
2009	35 / 5 / 1 / 11 / 32
2012	31 / 1 / 1 / 7 / 11 / 33
2015	31 / 1 / 6 / 11 / 35
2018	23 / 2 / 1 / 1 / 9 / 10 / 37
2021	4 / 1 / 1 / 56 / 2 / 5 / 1 / 14
2024	1 / 54 / 2 / 1 / 2

== See also ==
- Politics of El Salvador
- List of legislatures by country
- List of presidents of the Legislative Assembly of El Salvador
