= Galician Americans =

Americans of Galician birth or descent

Galego-estadounidenses (Galician) Gallego-estadounidenses (Spanish)

Total population
- 25,457 (May 2025)

Regions with significant populations
- Florida, New York, New Jersey, California

Languages
- American English, Spanish, Portuguese, Galician

Religion
- Christianity (Roman Catholicism); Other religions

Galician Americans (Galician: Galego-estadounidenses, Spanish: Gallego-estadounidenses) are Americans of Galician descent.

The Galicians (Galician: Galegos; Spanish: Gallegos) are a cultural and ethnolinguistic group whose historic homeland is Galicia, in the north-west of the Iberian Peninsula (Europe). Galician and Castilian are the official languages of the Autonomous Community of Galicia.

Galician migration to the United States took place mainly between 1868 and 1930, although there was a second smaller wave in the late 1940s and 1950s, when Galicians managed to form a small community in Newark.

There are some notable Galician-born persons who have lived or are now residing in the US, such as musician Cristina Pato or teacher Anxo Brea, but they may do so temporarily and without being naturalized American. The list below refers to US-born or U.S. citizens of Galician ancestry.

== Notable people ==
- Estevez family
  - Joe Estevez (born 1946)
  - Martin Sheen (born Ramón Gerardo Antonio Estévez, 1940)
    - Emilio Estevez (born 1962; son of Martin)
    - Ramon Estevez (born 1963; son of Martin)
    - Charlie Sheen (born Carlos Irwin Estévez, 1965; son of Martin)
    - Renée Estevez (born 1967; daughter of Martin)
- Jerry Garcia (August 1, 1942 – August 9, 1995) musician and songwriter.
- Ramón Verea Spanish journalist, engineer and writer; inventor of a calculator with an internal multiplication table.
- Yglesias family.
  - Jose Yglesias (November 29, 1919 – November 7, 1995) American novelist and journalist. Yglesias was born in the Ybor City section of Tampa, Florida, and was of Cuban and Spanish descent. His father was from Galicia.
    - Rafael Yglesias Rafael Yglesias (born May 12, 1954, New York) American novelist and screenwriter. His parents were the novelists Jose Yglesias and Helen Yglesias.
      - Matthew Yglesias Matthew Yglesias (born May 18, 1981) American economics journalist and political blogger.
- Perez Hilton (Mario Armando Lavandeira, Jr.) (born March 23, 1978) known professionally as Perez Hilton, American blogger and television personality.
- Carmen Fariña teacher and politician.
- Octavio Vazquez (born 1972) composer and professor at Nazareth College (New York).
- Richard Fariña (March 8, 1937 – April 30, 1966) American folksinger, songwriter, poet and novelist.
- Manolo Sánchez (born 1929) personal valet to the 37th president of the United States Richard Nixon.
- Sonia Villapol (born May 8, 1977) neurocientist, Medical Center, Houston.
- Alberto Avendaño (born July 30, 1957) journalist, Washington Post.
- Antonio Lage-Seara (born July 15, 1987) communicator, cultural activist.
- Cristina Pato (born 1980), composer and professor.
- Novoa family from El Salvador, Mexico and originally from Maceda, Ourense, Galicia, Spain.
  - Fidel Antonio Novoa Meléndez (1863–1922)
    - Fidel Antonio Novoa Fuentes (1900–1981; son of Fidel I)
      - Ricardo Armando Novoa Arciniegas (1931–2017; son of Fidel II)
