= Rodolfo Parker =

Salvadoran politician

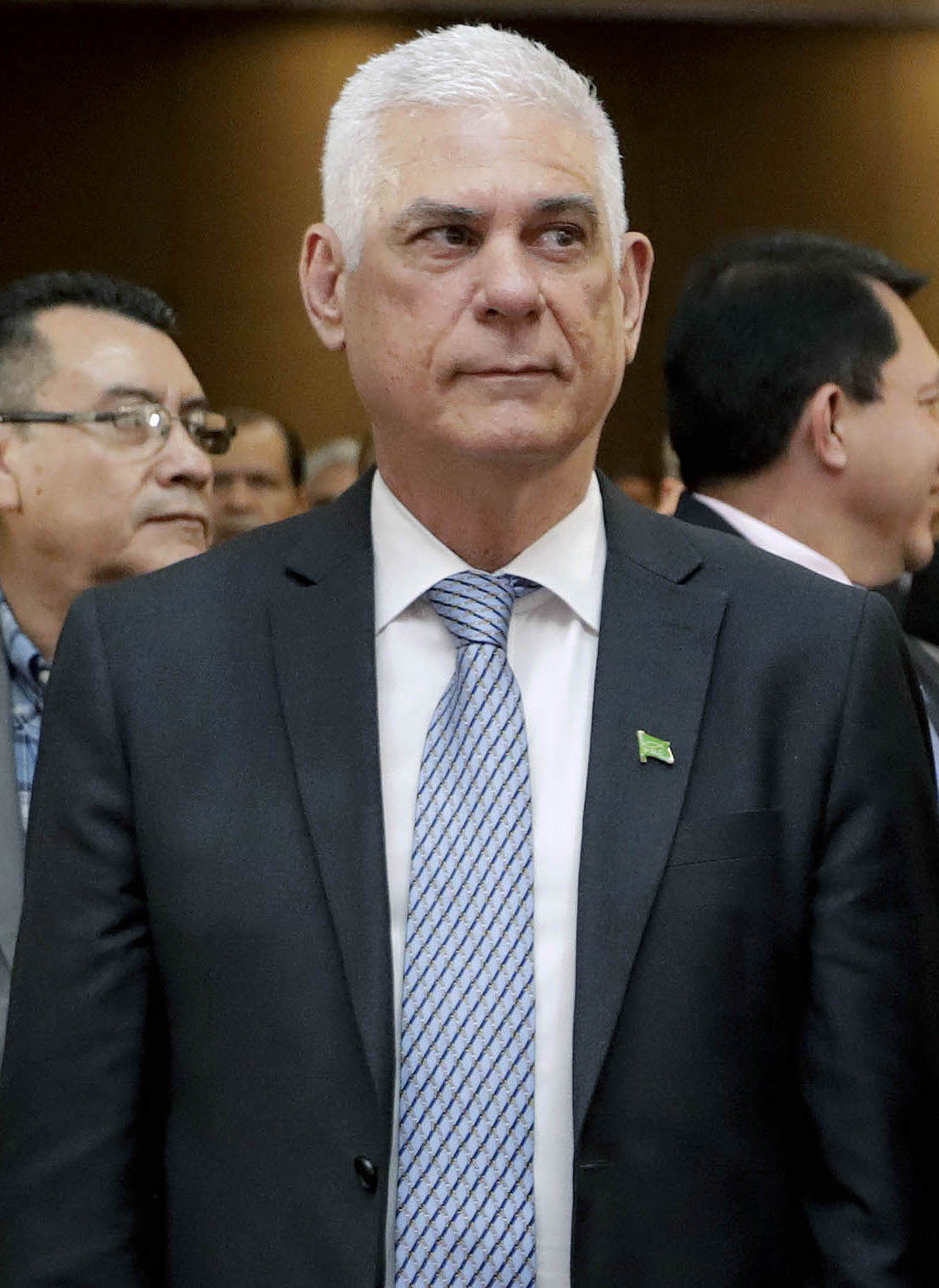
- Parker in 2018

Secretary-General of the Christian Democratic Party
- In office 2002 – 16 October 2021
- Preceded by: René Aguiluz
- Succeeded by: Reinaldo Carballo

Deputy of the Legislative Assembly of El Salvador from San Salvador
- In office 1 May 2006 – 1 May 2021

Personal details
- Born: Rodolfo Antonio Parker Soto; 1 November 1957 (age 68) San Salvador, El Salvador
- Party: Christian Democratic Party
- Spouse: Cristina Wein Niemann
- Children: 3
- Education: University of El Salvador; José Matías Delgado University; National University of Costa Rica
- Occupation: Politician, lawyer

Rodolfo Antonio Parker Soto (born 1 November 1957) is a Salvadoran politician and lawyer of the Christian Democratic Party (PDC).

== Biography ==
Parker is a lawyer, notary, and deputy for the department of San Salvador in parliament as its vice-president. Parker is married to German national Cristina Wein Niemann, has two daughters and a son Andrés Rodolfo Parker Wein (born 1982). His primary school was the Externado San José, he made 1975 its Abitur at the Liceo Salvadoreño. He studied Law and Social Sciences at the University of El Salvador and graduated from the José Matías Delgado University. In 1985, he made postgraduate studies in specialized international law at the National University of Costa Rica. From 1975 to 1979, he gained professional experience at the Juzgado de Primera Instancia, a court in San Salvador as an employee and secretary. Since 1985, he has a law firm. From 1981 to 1989 he was Assessor of the General Staff of FAES.

Parker was, as a civilian, a member of the Comisión Especial de Honor, an honorary commission to elucidate the involvement of the army in the UCA killings. The Truth Commission for El Salvador found that Parker's testimonies, which were made before the Comisión Especial de Honor, has changed in order to cover up the responsibility of senior officers. He put covers inter alia to Major Carlos Camilo Hernández Barahona.

He was a member of the negotiating team of the government in the peace negotiations. Member of the government team to accompany the implementation of the Peace Accords and 1994 from September 1992 to May Coordinator of Unidad de ejecución de los Acuerdos de Paz. He lectured at the José Matías Delgado University contract law. In 1999 he was legal adviser of some companies and presidential candidate of the Christian Democratic Party. Parker became the party's leader in 2002. He led the party until 2021.
