= Miguel Ángel Espino =

Salvadoran writer, journalist and lawyer

Miguel Ángel Espino (17 December 1902 – 1 October 1967) was a Salvadoran writer, journalist and lawyer.

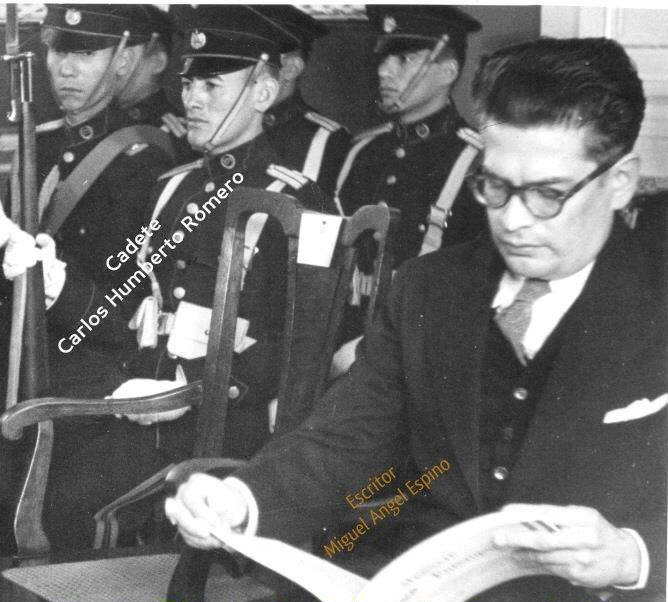
Miguel Ángel Espino – 1947

== Life ==
Born into a literary family, Espino was the younger brother of the lyric poet Alfredo Espino. His grandfather was Don Antonio Najarro (1850–1890), also a published poet.

He married María Luisa Nieto.

During the 1920s, he worked as a journalist for several newspapers, including La Prensa Gráfica. He joined the Faculty of Law and Social Sciences at the University of El Salvador in 1921. In 1927 he traveled to Mexico as part of a diplomatic delegation, and while there completed his Doctorate of Law at the National Autonomous University of Mexico in 1928.

A stroke in 1951 ended his literary career. He spent the last few years of his life in Mexico, where he died.

== Published works ==
- Mitología de Cuscatlán (eng. Cuscatlán mythology) (1919), a collection of Indian legends.
- Como Cantan Allá (eng. How to Sing Back) (1926), a collection of short stories
- Trenes (eng. Trains) (1940), a novel.
- Hombres Contra la Muerte (eng. Men Against Death) (1940), a novel set in Belize, published in Guatemala in 1942.

Both novels were translated into French and English, and in 1948 he was awarded a literary prize by the El Salvadoran government for Men Against Death.
