= Reinaldo Carballo =

Salvadoran politician and businessman

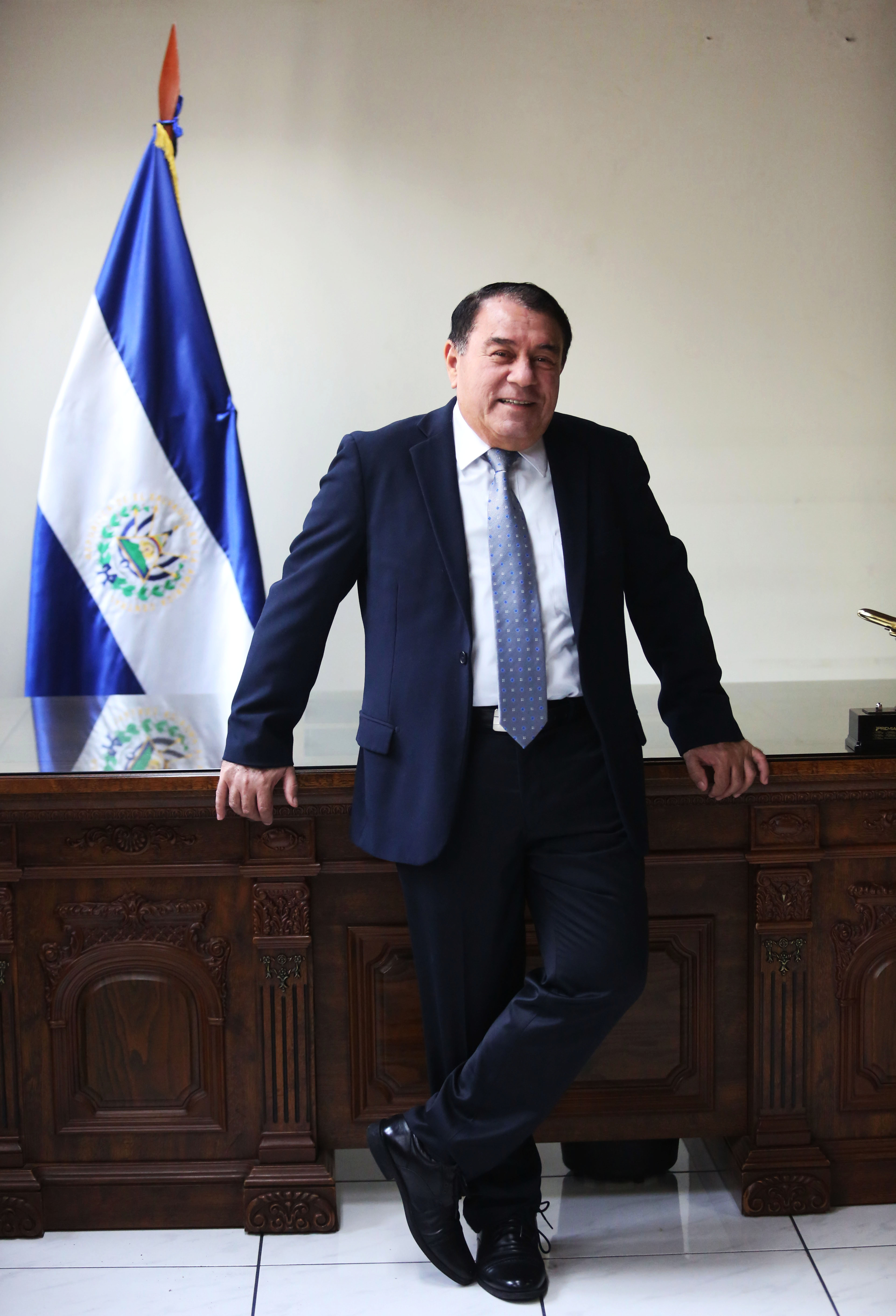
- Carballo in 2024

Deputy of the Legislative Assembly of El Salvador from San Miguel
- Incumbent
- Assumed office 1 May 2018

Secretary-General of the Christian Democratic Party
- Incumbent
- Assumed office 16 October 2021
- Preceded by: Rodolfo Parker

Personal details
- Born: Reinaldo Alcides Carballo Carballo; 9 May 1952 (age 74) Chapeltique, El Salvador
- Party: Christian Democratic Party
- Education: Atlantic International University
- Occupation: Politician, businessman, electrical engineer

Reinaldo Alcides Carballo Carballo (Note: Carballo's first name is sometimes rendered as "Reynaldo" rather than "Reinaldo".) (born 9 May 1952) is a Salvadoran politician, businessman, and electrical engineer. He has served as a deputy of the Legislative Assembly since 2018. As a deputy of the Legislative Assembly, he is serving as the legislature's third secretary; from 2021 to 2024, he served as its fourth secretary. Before becoming a politician, Carballo established several companies and education institutes.

== Early life ==
Reinaldo Alcides Carballo Carballo was born on 9 May 1952 in Chapeltique, El Salvador. He studied electrical engineering at the Ricaldone Technical Institute in San Salvador, El Salvador and completed his Bachelor's Degree in Electrical Engineering at the Atlantic International University in Honolulu, Hawaii.

== Business career ==
Carballo has founded five companies: the Exsal Industrial Electromanic Workshop (1975); the Concentrated Animal Food Factory (1979); the Carballo Family Industry and Service Company, S.A. de C.V. (1984); the Reinaldo Alcides Carballo Investment and Development Company (1994); and Export Wood and Furniture (2001). He has also founded four education institutes: the Salesian Alumni Technical Institute (1981), the Exsal Catholic School Center (1990); the Bilingual Technical Higher School in Aircraft Maintenance (2013); Bilingual Technical Higher School in Maritime Careers (2016).

Carballo initially founded the Salesian Alumni Technical Institute to provide an education to his employees after one of his workers wanted to establish his own companies but that he did not have the education or resources to do so. According to Carballo, his education institutes donate a combined US$400,000 to 500,000 to scholarships to support impoverished Salvadorans from kindergarten to high school.

== Political career ==
Carballo was elected as a deputy of the Legislative Assembly of El Salvador from the department of San Miguel during the 2018 legislative election. He has two mottoes: "the only tool to escape poverty, is education" ("la única herramienta para salir de la pobreza, es la educación") and "no to corruption, yes to education" ("no a la corrupción, sí a la educación"). During the 2019 presidential election, Carballo supported the candidacy of Nayib Bukele of the Grand Alliance for National Unity (GANA); Bukele won the election. In 2024, Carballo stated that he was almost expelled from the PDC for supporting Bukele's presidential election campaign. He also claimed that he and Juan José Martel, a deputy from Democratic Change, were the only two deputies of the 12th Legislative Assembly (2018–2021) to support Bukele's government. Carballo voted in favor of funding Bukele's anti-gang initiative known as the Territorial Control Plan.

Carballo was re-elected as a deputy of the Legislative Assembly during the 2021 legislative election. He was the only member of the PDC in the Legislative Assembly. Mario Miguel Espinal Rosales was elected as Carballo's supplement deputy. On 1 May 2021, Carballo was elected as the fourth secretary of the Legislative Assembly. On 7 May, he became the chairman of the Legislative Assembly's education and culture commission. Carballo was also a member of the agriculture commission; the politics commission; the treasury and special budget commission; and the youth and sports commission. During Carballo's second term, he continued to support Bukele's government and was officially a part of the ruling government coalition consisting of Nuevas Ideas (the political party Bukele established), GANA, the National Coalition Party, and the PDC. On 1 May, Carballo voted in favor of removing Raúl Melara (the attorney general) and the five justices of the Supreme Court's Constitution Chamber from their positions, however, the PDC condemned the removals on Twitter. Carballo also supported the Salvadoran gang crackdown and stated that repealing the state of emergency which made the crackdown possible would mean "return[ing] to the violent statistics of the past" ("regresar a los índices de violencia del pasado").

On 16 October 2021, Carballo was elected unopposed as the secretary-general of the Christian Democratic Party, succeeding Rodolfo Parker after serving as the party's leader for 19 years. Carballo announced that he would initiate in audit into the party's functions and that he would consider expelling Parker from the party for alleged breaches of the party's statutes. Carballo also affirmed that the PDC supported Bukele's government, and that Parker was the only part of the party which opposed Bukele. The Supreme Electoral Court (TSE) recognized Carballo's leadership of the PDC on 26 October. In December 2023, Carballo was elected to serve as the party's leader until December 2026.

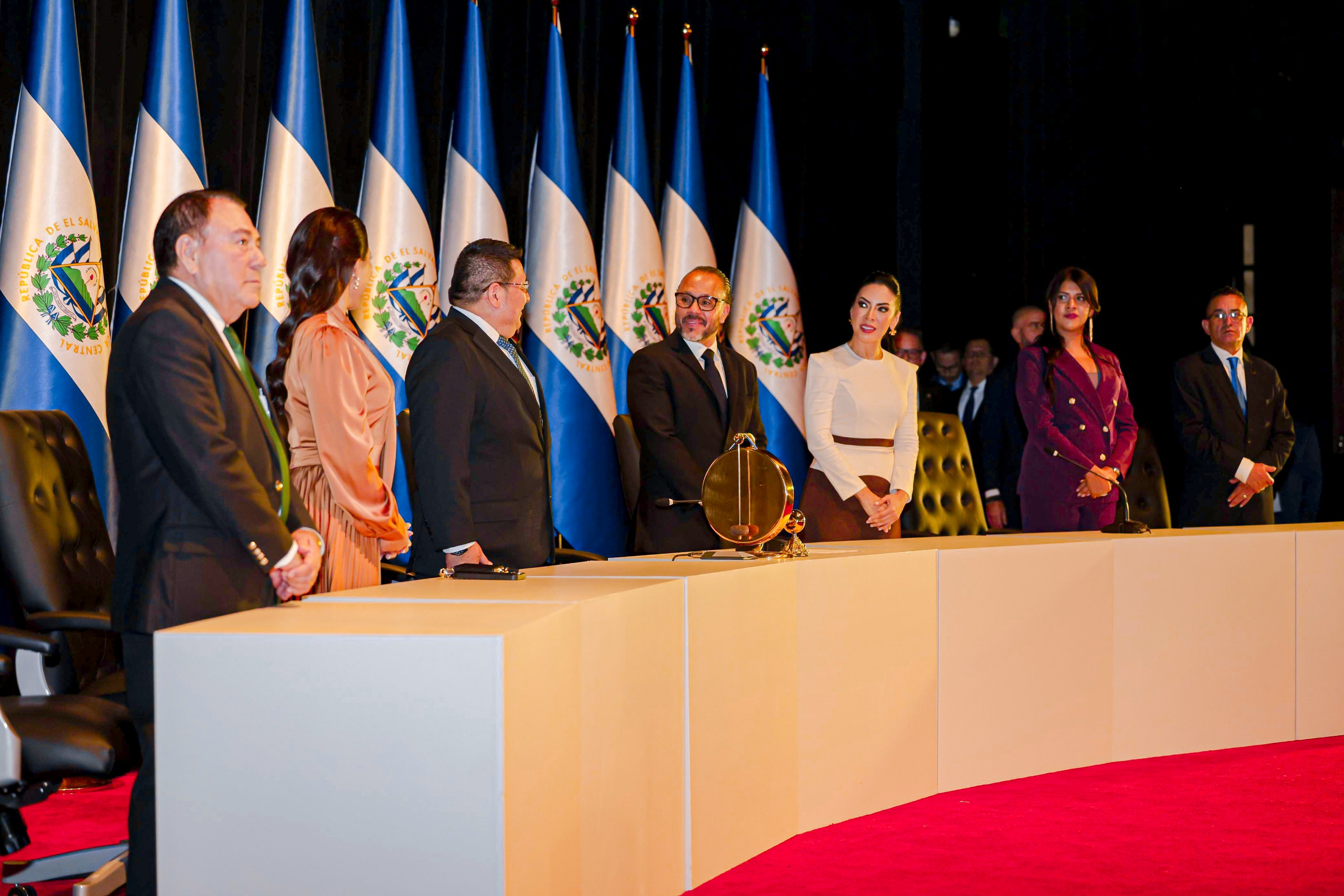
Carballo (far-left) in 2025

During the 2024 legislative election, Carballo won 46,510 marks and was re-elected as a deputy of the Legislative Assembly. He remained the only member of the PDC in the Legislative Assembly. Additionally, Espinal was re-elected as Carballo's supplement deputy. After Carballo's re-election, he reaffirmed that he would support Bukele's government in the Legislative Assembly and that he had always supported Bukele's policies. On 1 May 2024, Carballo was elected as the third secretary of the Legislative Assembly with 57 of 60 votes in favor.

== Personal life ==
According to the Gato Encerrado magazine, Carballo had a net worth of US$3,191,254 as of November 2022, making him the wealthiest member of the Legislative Assembly.

== Notes ==
Political offices
| Preceded by Reynaldo Cardoza | Third Secretary of the Legislative Assembly of El Salvador; 2024–present | Incumbent |
| Preceded by Patricia Valdivieso | Fourth Secretary of the Legislative Assembly of El Salvador; 2021–2024 | Office abolished |
Party political offices
| Preceded by Rodolfo Parker | Secretary-General of the Christian Democratic Party; 2021–present | Incumbent |
