= Constantino Fuentes Parra =

Salvadoran Historian and Attorney

President of the Legislative Assembly
- In office 20 March 1881 – 1882 Serving with Teodoro Moreno
- Preceded by: Teodoro Moreno
- Succeeded by: Teodoro Moreno

Personal details
- Born: May 6, 1839 San Salvador, El Salvador, Federal Republic of Central America
- Died: November 2, 1882 (aged 46) San Salvador, El Salvador
- Spouse(s): Dominga Hernández and Dolores Najarro
- Parent(s): José Manuel Fuentes Madrid, Ana Josefa Parra
- Relatives: María Inés Fuentes Najarro; Fidel Novoa Meléndez; Fidel Novoa Fuentes; Ricardo Armando Novoa Arciniegas
- Education: University of El Salvador

Constantino Fuentes Parra (May 1836 – November 2, 1882) was a Salvadoran politician and attorney who served as President of the Legislative Assembly of El Salvador.

== Political career ==
Fuentes Parra gave a speech when he graduated with honor as bachelor's in civil law in April 1859. He started his political career as congressman in 1872. Constantino Fuentes Parra was President of the Legislative Assembly of El Salvador in 1881, while the country had also a Senate and a bicameral legislative branch.
