= Alfredo Espino =

Salvadoran poet (1900–1928)

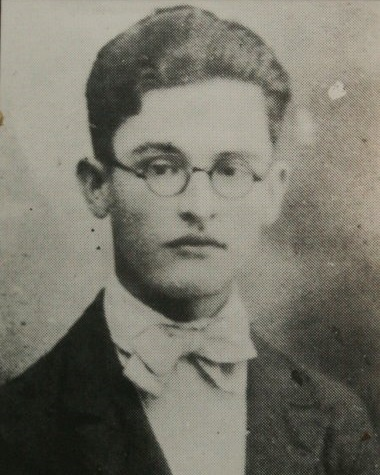
- Born: Edgardo Alfredo Espino Najarro; January 30, 1900; Ahuachapán Department, El Salvador
- Died: May 24, 1928 (aged 28); San Salvador, El Salvador
- Education: University of El Salvador
- Occupation: Poet
- Parents: Alfonso Espino; Enriqueta Najarro de Espino
- Relatives: Miguel Ángel Espino Najarro

Alfredo Espino (30 January 1900 – 24 May 1928), also known as el poeta niño (transl. the Boy Poet), was a Salvadoran poet known for his posthumous anthology of 96 poems, Jícaras tristes (transl. Sad Gourds), which has become one of the most well known poetic works in El Salvador. His poetry has been described as part of the Salvadoran development of costumbrismo. Espino was born in Ahuachapán Department and died in the capital city of San Salvador.

== Biography ==
Edgardo Alfredo Espino Najarro was born in Ahuachapán Department, in western El Salvador, on January 30, 1900. He was the second of eight children of educator Enriqueta Najarro and Alfonso Espino, both teachers and poets. He grew up in a home filled with poetry and a love of art. According to historian Carlos Cañas Dinarte, he was remembered as being "modest and easy-going, of a gentle and even timid temperament, a fine humorist in intimate settings and possessor of an astonishing memory." He would write poetry and show them to his close family, whose positive responses he reacted to with timidity. He came to be known as the poeta niño (transl. Boy Poet) because of how young he was when he began to write poetry.

Apart from poetry, he also practiced music and graphic arts. He was known to be a good guitarist, and also painted and drew caricatures. He also had a penchant for writing sainetes, one of which, now lost, was presented in San Salvador in August 1928 by the Escuela de Declamación y Prácticas Escénicas, directed by Gerardo de Nieva. He was a member of literary societies and an active collaborator with multiple publications and newspapers.

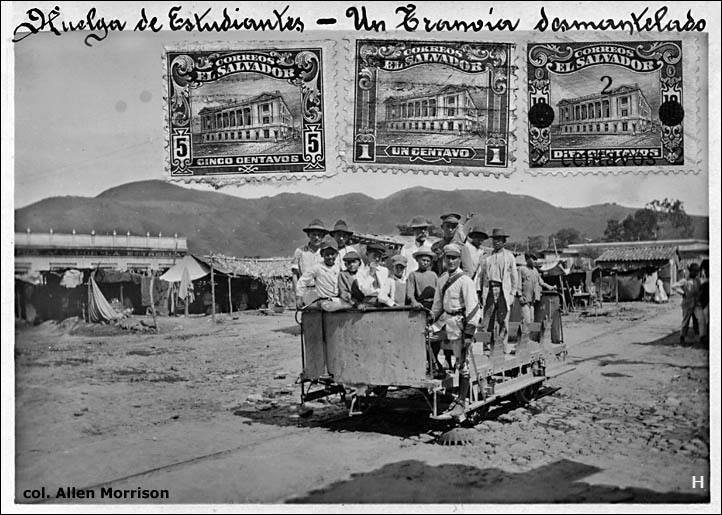
1920 student strike in which Espino participated.

In 1920, he entered the University of El Salvador, enrolling in the Faculty of Jurisprudence. During his stay at the University City, he participated in many activities within the school, including demonstrations by students to prevent the rise in tram fares. He completed his studies and obtained a doctorate in law on March 12, 1927, with his thesis Sociología estética; his thesis was published a month later in the Sansalvadoran magazine Pareceres.

He suffered from depression and alcoholism in the last years of his life. Sources close to him and his family suggested that his parents' refusal to allow his marriage to certain young women on multiple occasions led to constant emotional and romantic turmoil. He tried to cope by living a bohemian lifestyle, frequenting bars and brothels in the country's capital.

Espino's health deteriorated due to alcohol abuse. He died in the dawn of May 24, 1928, aged 28, in San Salvador, in an alcoholic crisis. It is speculated that his death was a suicide, and there are rumors that he had hanged himself or overdosed on pills. He was buried in the General Cemetery; present at his burial were the writer and lawyer Julio Enrique Avila and then baccalaureates Manuel F. Chavarría and Rafael Vásquez, who gave speeches. His body was later moved to the Crypt of the Poets in the Jardines del Recuerdo Cemetery.

== Works ==
After his death, Espino's father made a collection of and organized some of his poetry. A portion of this collection of Espino's works was published in a 1932 issue of the newspaper Reforma Social, with editorial input from his father and a prologue by Alberto Masferrer. The anthology of 96 works by Espino was then published in 1936 under the title Jícaras tristes (transl. Sad Gourds) by the University of El Salvador press. His younger brother, Miguel Ángel Espino, also a prominent writer, is considered by some to have been overshadowed by the legend of Alfredo Espino's life.

His poetry includes sonnets, romances, and free verses and is described as being written in a style that is simple and easy to comprehend. He focused on bucolic themes relating to the Salvadoran countryside and customs, but he also broached themes like prostitution, sadness, and women who suffered from violence and abortions. His work is considered to be part of the Salvadoran development of costumbrismo. Because of his focus on rural themes, his works were seen as culturally conformist and came to be considered the model for state-approved poetry in El Salvador; according to Latin Americanist literary critic John Beverly and researcher Marc Zimmerman, this placed his work in "the pole opposite" of later generations of Salvadoran poets.

Espino's poetry has become one of the best known poets of El Salvador and has been considered "the national poet". Among his most popular works are El nido (transl. The Nest), Asensión (transl. Ascension, Un rancho y un lucero (transl. A Ranch and a Morning Star), Árbol de fuego (transl. Tree of Fire), Los ojos de los bueyes (transl. The Eyes of Oxen).
