= Wildfires in Galicia =

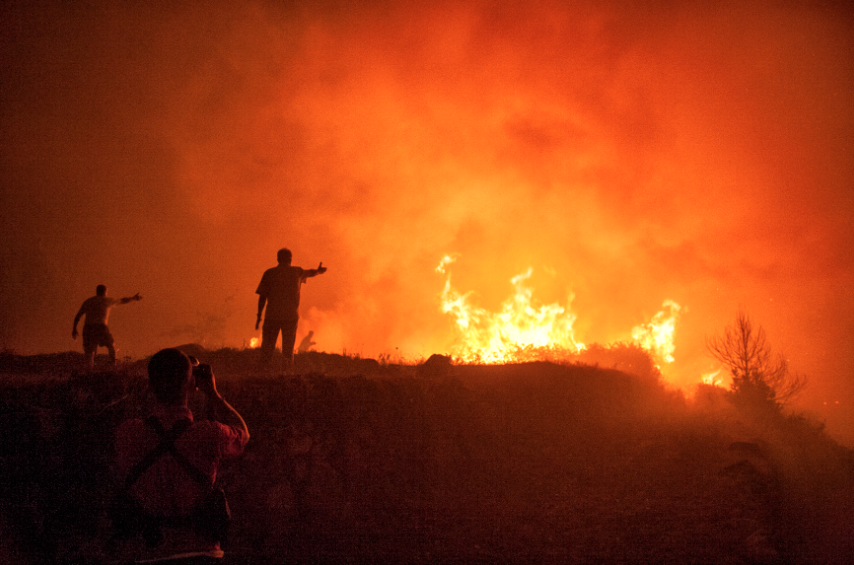
2006 wildfire in Baiona by Delmi Álvarez

Fires in Galicia are caused by deforestation and brush clearing, the removal of indigenous fauna, and arsonists. The fires have been occurring since the mid-1990s. Fires in Galicia represent 50% of the area burned each year in Spain and 40% of all fires.

== History ==
With the first fire, hundreds and thousands succeeded, cataloging several provinces of Galicia as a catastrophic area.

The long-term documentary project began with el diario La Región de Ourense, publishing a story in the 80's with the pilots of the Air Force's Canadair CL-215 seaplane ("43 Group") from the firefighting group based in Lavacolla started, one by one, the two Pratt & Whitney R-2800-83AM 18-cylinder radial piston engines, with a power of 2100 hp each, to load 5000 liters of water.

On 2006, the province of Pontevedra was like and apocalipsis with the 30/30/30 rule to generate fires.

On Sunday 15 October 2017, Galicia experienced an unusual heat wave at that time of the year, and shortly after noon the heat, the relative humidity of the air formula 30/30/30 = forest fire (More than 30 degrees temperature, less than 30% humidity and winds of more than 30 kilometers per hour.) activated the alarm of extreme risk of fires in the southern area of the Galician country.

On 2025, Galicia, León and Portugal, the triangle of fire burned more than 400.000 hectareas.

== Causes and prevention ==
Galician biologist Xabier Vázquez Pumariño among other scientific, claim for the eradicate the proliferation of new eucalyptus plantations and unnatural invasive species of the Galician ecosystem. That kind of business give profit to many people earning millions of euros but destroying the native forests, also there is a liking of pollution in the sea (Ence, Celulosa, Paper pulp mill in Pontevedra). The eucalyptus grow fast and takes a lot of water

The brush clearing, the lack of autochthonous Galician horses that eat the gorse and help to clean the forest, the disastrous forestry policy, the contracts in aircraft rentals, the lack of means and brigades for the extinction, or the increase of the plantation of eucalyptus that devastates the mountains and forests where there used to be native trees that protected it from fire.

According to the media and experts, fires in Galicia could be avoided if there were means and an effective plan to avoid them. Another major problem that has not been solved is the emerging plantation of eucalyptus, an invasive species from Australia that destroys the land and is a business that proliferates among many owners of forests, to supply the only pulp company in Pontevedra, being many years, the point of attention among ecologists and people living from the collection of shellfish in the estuary of Pontevedra.

The Galician Government began a compensation initiative to encourage the substitution of eucalyptus for native vegetation or to achieve its elimination in those areas where, by nature, no type of plantation existed. In Portugal and Galicia, ecologists, schools and environmental protection groups have taken the initiative to uproot the eucalyptus and plant other species. This is the case of Ferraria de Sao Joao, a village in the municipality of Penela (Portugal), which was threatened by recent large forest fires that devastated thousands of hectares, a threat that Casal de Sao Simao also suffered, so both decided to act to protect its population by uprooting eucalyptus. In addition, environmentalists in the area denounce the lack of control over illegal plantations of this alien arboreal species.

In Galicia and Portugal, brigades of dissatisfied citizens have been created to remove the eucalyptus shoots.

United Nations (UN) recognizes the recovering of natural spaces in the mountains of Froxán and Santiago de Covelo - in A Coruña municipality of Lousame and Covelo (Pontevedra), respectively. They have become the first in Spain and third in Europe to enter the ICCA registry, under the United Nations Program United for the Environment. This international distinction recognizes those natural spaces that are managed, recovered or rehabilitated effectively by local or indigenous communities.

Eucalyptus is a support for the expansion of Velutina wasp, due to the high altitude of this species and to be a perennial leaf that protects and camouflages throughout the year. This insect kills bees of honey that affects beekeepers and has already become a plague and also kill people.

== Documentation ==
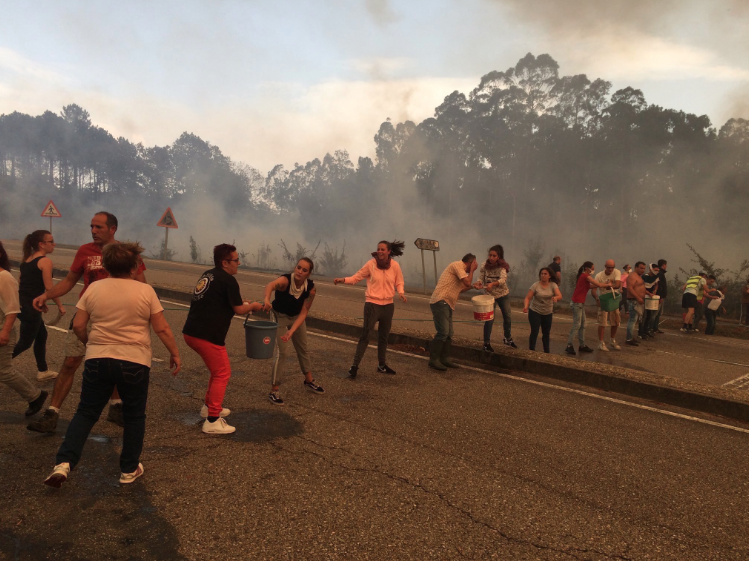
Bucket brigade in Valadares photographed by Delmi Alvarez

Photojournalist Delmi Alvarez documented the fires and their aftermaths starting in 2006 in a project called Burning land: Queiman Galiza, Arde Galiza (Burn Galicia). Alvarez experimented with other photojournalists one of the most tragic days documenting fires.
