= Ricardo Armando Novoa Arciniegas =

Salvadoran attorney, notary and politician

Deputy Director General Salvadoran Social Security Institute
- In office 31 July 1967 – 1975 Serving with José Kuri Asprides

Judge of the Supreme Court of Justice of El Salvador
- In office 1989–1994 Serving with Mauricio Gutiérrez Castro

Personal details
- Born: 1 September 1931 San Salvador, El Salvador
- Died: 12 May 2017 (aged 86) San Salvador, El Salvador
- Resting place: Cemetery of Distinguished Citizens
- Spouse: Gladys Muñoz López
- Parent(s): Fidel Novoa Fuentes, Mercedes Antonia Arciniegas Villatoro
- Relatives: Constantino Fuentes Parra; Juan María Villatoro Medrano; Fidel Novoa Meléndez; Germán Arciniegas; Fidel Novoa Fuentes
- Education: Liceo Salvadoreño and University of El Salvador
- Occupation: Politician, attorney, notary and writer

Ricardo Armando Novoa Arciniegas (1 September 1931 – 12 May 2017) was a Salvadoran attorney at law, notary, writer and politician.

== Early life ==
Born the 1st of September 1931. His parents were Fidel Novoa Fuentes and Mercedes Antonia Arciniegas Villatoro. He attended the Salvadoran Lyceum in San Salvador, obtaining a bachelor's degree in science and art in 1948. Doctor of jurisprudence and notary, degree obtained at the University of El Salvador in 1959, His doctoral thesis was published in January 1959 and is entitled: General Considerations for Reforming Jury Institution in El Salvador.

Founder of Corporate Law Offices: Novoa-Rivera-Colorado. He was a writer for a weekly column "Judicial Viewpoint" (Mirador Judicial) at La Prensa Gráfica where he provided political analysis, and later "Spiritual Viewpoint" (Mirador Espiritual) where he explained The Bible in layman's terms.

== Political career ==
The Golden order's star on a necklet and membership to Spain's Order of Civil Merit, 1972.

Ricardo Armando Novoa Arciniegas was appointed for 10 years as Deputy Director General of the Salvadorean Social Security Institute (cabinet roll, 31 July 1967 and 4 July 1972) during the administrations of Fidel Sánchez Hernández and Arturo Armando Molina, from 1967 to 1977. Novoa Arciniegas was appointed Judge of the Supreme Court of El Salvador in 1989 during the administrations of Alfredo Cristiani. His international notoriety was recognized by decree through Generalisimo Francisco Franco of Spain and the government of Spain, when Novoa Arciniegas was awarded Golden order's star on a necklet and membership to the Order of Civil Merit, with the title of Commander, on October 2, 1972.

His paternal great-grandfather Constantino Fuentes Parra was president of the Legislative Assembly in 1881, his maternal great-grandfather Juan María Villatoro Medrano was a congressman in 1868 and Judge of the Supreme Court of Justice in Dec. 1883, Jan. 1886 and in 1905, his grandfather Fidel Novoa Meléndez was President of the Legislative Assembly in 1903 and 1912, his father Fidel Novoa Fuentes was a Governor of Cuscatlán Department in 1924 and congressman in 1929, and his brother Fidel Antonio Novoa Arciniegas was the Mayor of San Salvador in 1964.

== Death ==
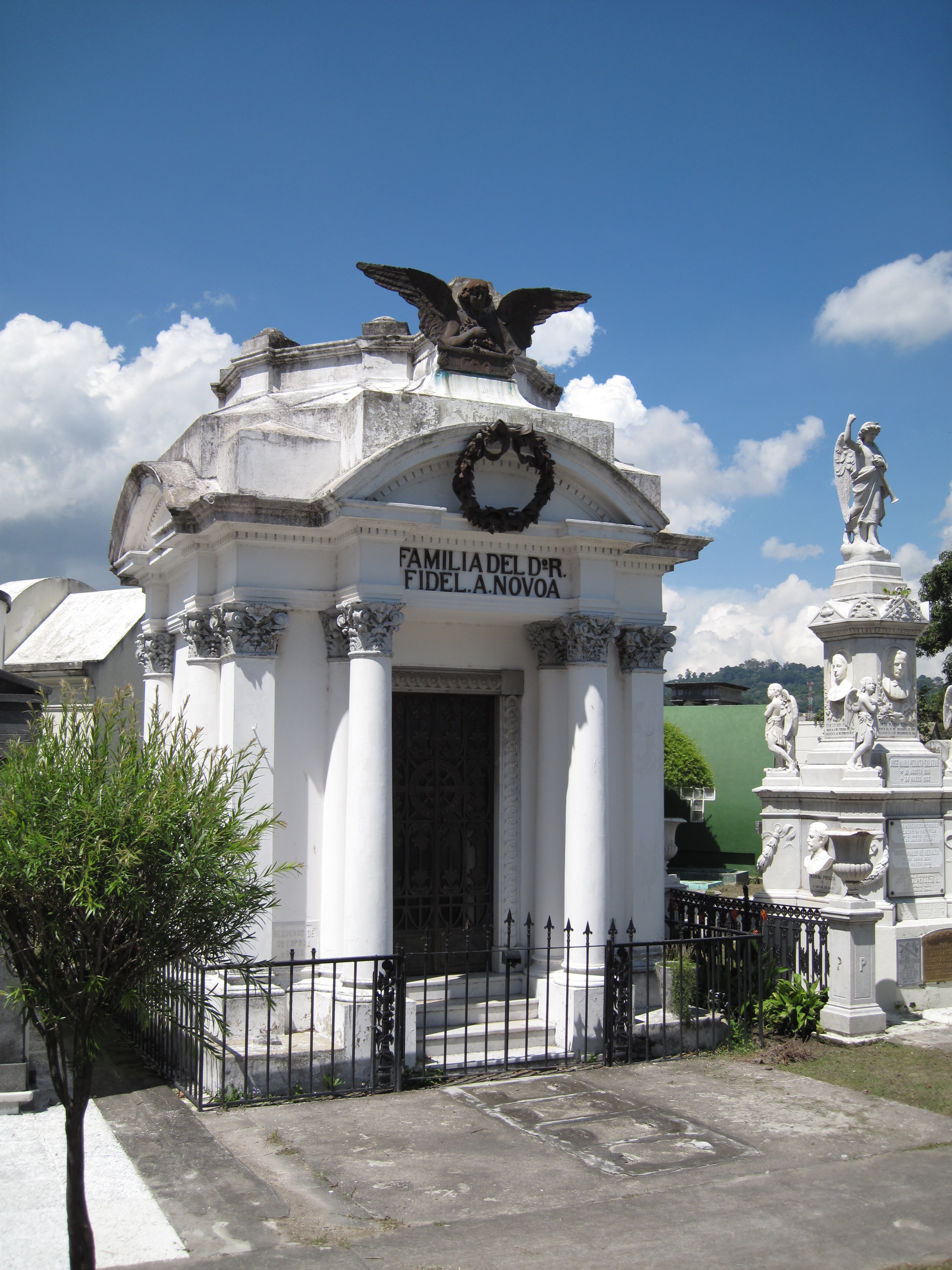
Novoa Family mausoleum, partially destroyed after 1985 earthquake in San Salvador General Cemetery "Los Ilustres".

He died in San Salvador, at the Salvadorean Social Security Institute Hospital; a hospital built during his administration as Deputy Director General during the Fidel Sánchez Hernández Presidency. He was buried in the "Los Ilustres" general cemetery of the city of San Salvador, in the Novoa Family mausoleum.

Political offices
Preceded by Julio Adalberto Rivera cabinet	Deputy Director General of the Salvadorean Social Security Institute; 1967-1977	Succeeded by Carlos Humberto Romero cabinet
Preceded by José Napoleón Duarte appointee	Appointed Judge of the Supreme Court of Justice of El Salvador; 1989-1994	Succeeded by Armando Calderón Sol appointee
