= Fidel Novoa Fuentes =

Salvadoran physician and politician (1900–1981)

Fidel Antonio Novoa Fuentes

Deputy of the Legislative Assembly of El Salvador
- In office 13 February 1929 – 1930 Serving with Fernando López

Governor of Cuscatlán Department
- In office 1923–1928 Serving with Fernando López

Personal details
- Born: 23 January 1900 San Salvador, El Salvador
- Died: 10 June 1981 (aged 81) San Salvador, El Salvador
- Resting place: Cemetery of Distinguished Citizens
- Spouse: Mercedes Antonia Arciniegas Villatoro
- Parent(s): Fidel Novoa Meléndez, María Inés Fuentes Najarro
- Relatives: Constantino Fuentes Parra; Fidel Novoa Meléndez; Ricardo Armando Novoa Arciniegas (son, 1931–2017)
- Education: Liceo Salvadoreño and University of El Salvador
- Occupation: Politician, physician, surgeon

Fidel Antonio Novoa Fuentes (23 January 1900 – 10 June 1981) was a Salvadoran physician, surgeon and politician.

== Early life ==
Fuentes' pharmacy outside, downtown San Salvador, 1927.

Born 23 January 1900. His parents were Fidel Novoa Meléndez and María Inés Fuentes Najarro. He attended primary school at the Salvadoran Lyceum and secondary school at the Francisco Menéndez National Institute (INFRAMEN) in San Salvador, obtaining a bachelor's degree in science and art in 1917. Doctor of medicine and surgeon, degree obtained at the University of El Salvador in 1926, with post-graduate studies in the urinary tract in Paris, France in 1926, at the Necker clinic. His doctoral thesis was published on 20 February 1926 and is entitled: Treatment of Chronic Diarrhea to Protozoan by Estovarsol.

San Salvador National Children's Home, downtown San Salvador, 1930's.

Novoa Fuentes headed the Novoa Pharmacy from 1922, due to his father's death. He was an ad honorem physician and director of the Hospice for Orphans, later called the National Children's Home, from 1928 to 1945.

== Political career ==
Novoa Fuentes was the Governor of Cuscatlán Department, when during his governorship in 1924 construction began in Cojutepeque for the Mountain Park (Cerro de las Pavas). Later he was elected as congressman of the Legislative Assembly of El Salvador in 1929.

Fuentes's maternal grandfather Constantino Fuentes Parra was president of the Legislative Assembly in 1881, his father Fidel Novoa Meléndez was President of the Legislative Assembly in 1903 and 1912, and both his sons Fidel Antonio Novoa Arciniegas were the Mayor of San Salvador in 1964. a

== Death ==
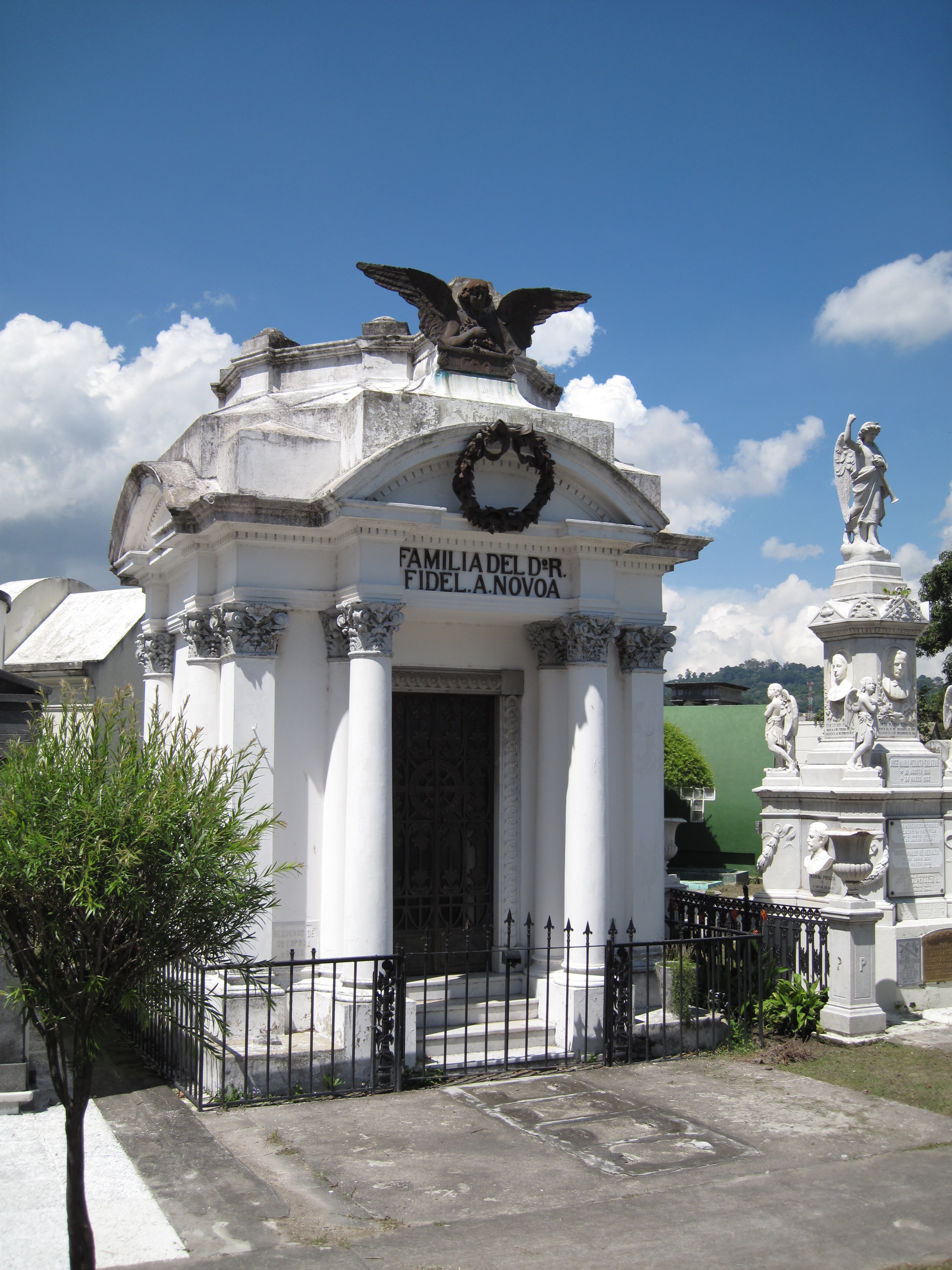
Novoa Family mausoleum, partially destroyed after 1985 earthquake in San Salvador General Cemetery "Los Ilustres".

Died in San Salvador, at the Policlinica Hospital on 10 June 1981. He was buried in the "Los Ilustres" general cemetery of the city of San Salvador, in the Novoa Family mausoleum.
