= Delmi Álvarez =

Galician photojournalist

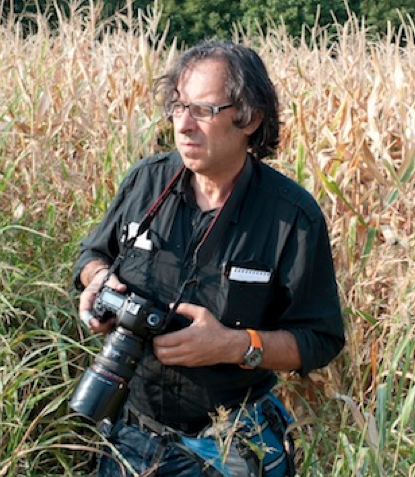
- Álvarez in 2011
- Born: Vigo, Galicia
- Occupations: Photojournalist; Documentary photography; writer
- Website: www.delmialvarez.com

Delmi Álvarez is a Galician photojournalist and documentary photographer. His work documents migration phenomena, especially of the Galician diaspora, and environmental and human rights issues. He has organized and curated several photography projects with other international photographers.

== Photography career ==
Álvarez is a self-taught photojournalist and documentary photographer. He has travelled widely documenting migratory phenomena such as refugee crises and the Galician diaspora. He also documents environmental and human rights issues.

He has participated in collective exhibitions and written several books, one about Galicia with the participation of two Magnum Photos agency photographers, Ian Berry and Richard Kalvar, and one long-term project Galegos na Diáspora, 1989-2009 about Galicians who migrated around the world.

He has worked for the Associated Press and taught at Vigo's School of Image and Sound. From 2003 to 2011 he moved to Latvia working as photojournalist and writer for the newspaper Diena. He is a photojournalist with El País from 1984, and is currently based in Brussels.

=== Projects ===
In 1990 and 1991 Álvarez documented the lives of Cubans during Periodo Especial en Tiempo de Paz, in a project titled Cuba, el ultimo bastion: la lucha de un pueblo.

He has photographed inside prisons, and the flow and settlement of immigrants to Europe and their human and living aspects. He has photographed inside psychiatric hospitals in El Borda in Buenos Aires, Argentina and Conxo (Santiago de Compostela, Galicia).

He covered the Yugoslav wars (1991–1995) and published a book in 1994, called Reporteiro de guerra en Iugoslavia, about the fighting and aftermath of a war. In 1996 Álvarez traveled to Salvador de Bahia to document the consequences of poverty in Salvador de Bahía and the Sertão region: slavery and child labor of children working in the Sisal and pedreiras. For four months Álvarez lived in Salvador and travelled to different places of the Bahia region documenting the judicial police, military police, street children and raids against the prostitution in the neighborhood of Beirú (Tancredo Neves) one of the most dangerous favelas of the capital. In 1999, Alvarez began a personal project about the ancient pilgrimage to Santiago de Compostela. He walked for 30 days, from Roncesvalles, the Camino de Santiago on assignment for a Galician newspaper, sending chronicles by fax and letters together with the rolls of film. Later the same newspaper ordered him to travel the Portuguese Way from Lisbon only indicated from Oporto.

In 2006, based on these experiences, he was commissioned to publish a book and an exhibition of the Camino Francés from Roncesvalles. He proposed that other Galician and international photographers join the project, thus creating a diversity of fourteen different views of the old pilgrimage road, each unique, in which each author traveled a portion of the Camino for a week.

With the different points of view, the photographers created a unique long term documentary photographic essay, exploring the ancient pilgrimage to Santiago de Compostela walked by millions of people around the world. At the same time that the project was growing, the authors gave their own opinions on how to continue photographing, since in principle the organizers wanted something like beautiful postcards, which the photographers refused. Several exhibitions were programmed around the world but the organizers changed the name of the project two times. Four books were published from the project.

Participants in the project included Álvarez, Fernando Bellas, Tino Martínez, Javier Teniente, Xulio Villarino, Tino Viz, Cristina de Middle, Hana Jakrlova, Rita Newman, Chris Erlbeck, Tine Harden, Katja Lösönen, Eva Persson and Signe Raikstina. Alvarez has documented the Galician diaspora, travelling to "a hundred cities" on five continents to inventory Galician immigration.

It is known as the Galician diaspora, the process of mass emigration of the Galician people to the Americas, which occurred during the last three decades of the 19th century until well into the middle of the 20th century. In the first decade of the 20th century, the Galician Diaspora arrived by ship from Europe to Asia, and specifically Australia and New Zealand. In the second decade of the 21st century, due to the crisis in Galicia and Spain, a second wave of Galician emigration began, mainly to countries of northern Europe (Germany and England), primarily educated young people. In 1989 he began the long term documentary Galegos na Diáspora, travelling around the world by bus with other emigrants and documenting the fall of the Berlin wall and Galicians living there.

In the next years 1990-91 he photographed in Canada, USA, Mexico, Cuba, Venezuela, Brazil, Argentina and Uruguay. In 1992-93 he began the third part of the project in Jerusalem, Thailand, China, Japan, Australia and New Zealand. In 2002 he travel around Africa from Cabo Verde to Senegal, Mauritania, Guinea Ecuatorial, Namibia, South Africa, Mozambique and Tanzania.

In 2006 he went to Russia with a team of journalists in co-production with TVG (Televisión de Galicia) to film Galicians living in Moscú and Krasnodar.

In 2009, he travelled around the US, from New York to Washington DC, Boston, Miami, Texas, Houston, Kansas, San Francisco, Chicago, Lincoln, and flying to Panama, Chile and Argentina, ending the project to publish Galegos na Diáspora 1989-2009. In 2009 he filmed "Fuga de Cerebros", a documentary for TVG about Galician scientists living in the Diaspora in Stockholm (Sweden), Paris (France), Cologne (Germany) and Alabama (US), but it was not broadcast. In 2010 in co-production with journalist Arturo Lezcano and TVG they filmed Galicians in the Guaiana venezolana.

Between 2007 and 2008 in co-production with TVG, Signe Raikstina, and journalist Arturo Lezcano, they filmed "O rei galego de África" in Namibia.

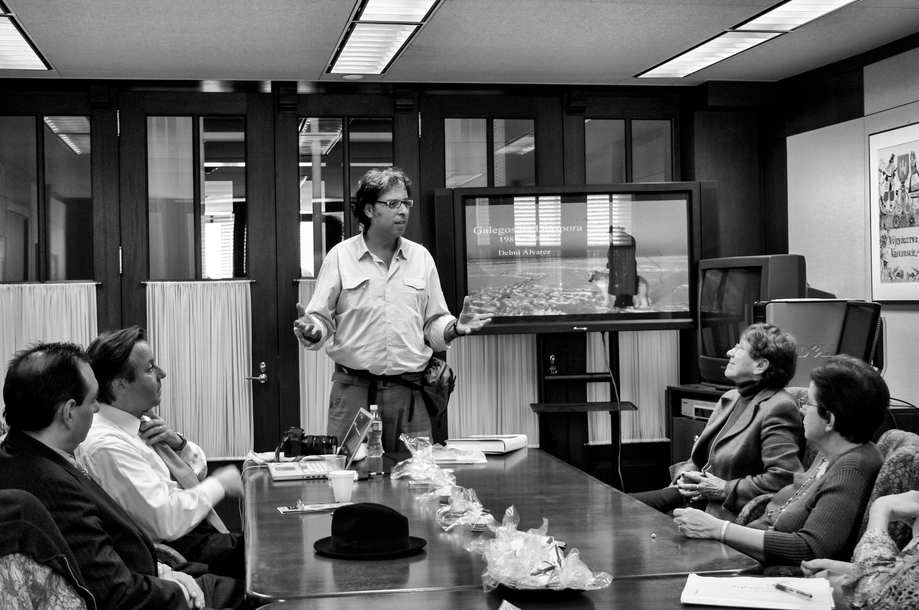
Álvarez at the Library of Congress

After 20 years, in 2009, the project was completed. The Galician Government published book for use in conferences in schools and universities in and out of Galicia. Alvarez gave presentations at the Library of Congress in Washington, DC, in 2009 and at the City University of New York (CUNY) about the project Galegos na Diáspora.

=== Long term documentaries ===
Starting in 2009, he has photographed the Himba in Namibia.

In 2013, Álvarez began a long term documentary photographic project about gold mining in Europe called In the name of Gold about mining in Europe using cyanide and the effects on farmers and fishermen.

In 2016 he released the long term documentary project Transmigrants (2003-2016) about refugees in Greece, Belgium, France and Latvia.

In 2017 he covered, as an independent documentary photographer, the 2017 Catalan independence referendum, the general strike of October 3, the elections to the Parliament of Catalonia corresponding to the formation of its XII legislature were held on Thursday, December 21, 2017, and the unionists' demonstration on October 9.

In 2018 he began documenting the Hambacher Forst, a forest in Northwestern Renanian-Westfalia in Germany threatened to be destroyed by mining. Since 2012 environmental activists have occupied or lived in the forest building houses in the tree-tops. In September 2018 they were forcibly evicted by the police.

Some of his work is in the museum Marco de Vigo.

Starting in 2006 Álvarez documented the fires in Galicia caused by deforestation and the aftermath for the ecosystems and people in a project called Queiman Galiza (Burn Galicia).

== Awards ==
- 1987: Fotopres. Winner in Daily life, Telanosa. La Caixa, Barcelona
- 1993: Fotopres. Cuba documentary. Winner first prize. La Caixa. Barcelona
- 2012: Diena journalism prizes (First) for Europe:a paradise of broken dreams. Riga, Latvia 2012.
- 2013: Finalist 19º FotoPres "La Caixa"

== Filmography and documentary ==
Álvarez produced four broadcast documentaries from an ethnographic and anthropological perspective of the Galician diaspora in Africa, Venezuela and Russia based in the book Galegos na Diáspora 1989-2009. Two more documentary film projects, one about Himbas filmed in the north of Namibia, and another about Galician diaspora scientists living in Stockholm, Paris, Koln and Alabama, stopped filming when the Galician government changed in 2009.

- O rei galego de África: A Galician businessman living in Namibia. Broadcast and co-produced by TVG (Television de Galicia)
- Galegos en Rusia: The story of two Galicians in the city of Krasnodar. Broadcast and co-produced by TVG (Television de Galicia)
- Os galegos da Guaiana: The stories of 4 Galicians living in the jungle of Venezuela. Broadcast and co-produced by TVG (Television de Galicia)
- Fuga de Cerebros: The stories of four couples, all scientists, who emigrated from Galicia to Stockholm, Alabama, París and Koln.
- Himbas: Struggle to survive (2009): Ethnographic documentary about the Himba of Namibia.
- Greece, the gateway to Europe (2011): Illegal immigration into Greece
