= Antonia Navarro Huezo =

Salvadorean engineer, scientist and teacher

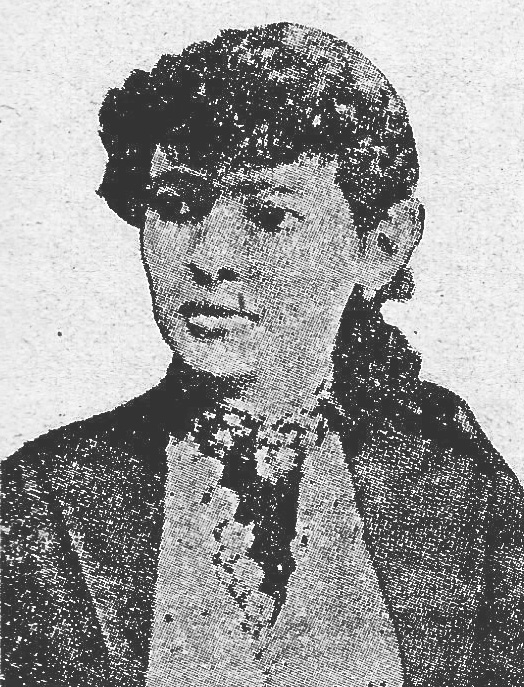
- Antonia Navarro Huezo
- Born: August 10, 1870; San Salvador, El Salvador
- Died: December 22, 1891 (aged 21); San Salvador, El Salvador
- Education: University of El Salvador
- Occupations: Engineer; Teacher

Antonia Navarro Huezo (San Salvador, 10 August 1870 – 22 December 1891) was a topographic engineer and teacher from El Salvador. She was the first woman in Central America to graduate from university, earning a PhD from the University of El Salvador in 1889.

== Biography ==
Antonia Navarro Huezo was born in 1870 to Belisaro Navarro (an apothecary) and Marina Huezo. The family was intellectual and despite the death of her father in 1878, her desire for education continued to be supported by an uncle. However her health was poor, and she was unable to attend school. Nevertheless she studied by herself and was allowed to take examinations to enter university. In 1887, she presented herself at the Faculty of Engineering at the University of El Salvador to study for her degree. During her time at university she had an affair with Alberto Sánchez Huezo, another student.

Huezo progressed quickly and excelled in all the classes - just two years later she was awarded a PhD in Engineering in 1889. She defended her thesis successfully on 20 September 1889, after thirteen hours of questioning. The news of her success was reported around the world. Her thesis examined the widely-recognised phenomenon of the Harvest Moon, the full moon that occurs nearest the Autumnal Equinox. As this occurred when the angle of the Moon's orbit relative to the Earth was at a minimum, this had been observed to provide additional minutes of useful light for farmers. However, Huezo proved in her thesis that this effect was only visible in latitudes of at least 45º, meaning that there would be no observable effect in El Salvador where the latitude was only 14º.

Huezo's thesis defence and the award of a degree was national news and the president of El Salvador General Francisco Menéndez congratulated her in person and organised a celebratory concert. However, despite being the first woman to graduate from university in El Salvador, she was not allowed to teach there and instead was posted to teach younger women in San Salvador's high school.

Huezo died of tuberculosis on 22 December 1891. She has no known grave.

=== Legacy ===
Huezo's achievements are an important milestone in women's history in El Salvador. She is seen as an important feminist role model for women in the country. There is a mural dedicated to her in the theatre of the University of El Salvador.
