= Fidel Novoa Meléndez =

Salvadoran politician (1863–1911)

Fidel Antonio Novoa Meléndez

57th and 63th President of the Legislative Assembly of El Salvador
- In office 13 February 1903 – 1904 Serving with Fernando López
- Preceded by: Dionisio Aráuz
- Succeeded by: Federico Mejía
- In office 29 April 1912 – 1913 Serving with Fernando López
- Preceded by: Rafael Pinto Figueroa
- Succeeded by: Carlos Meléndez

Deputy of the Legislative Assembly of El Salvador
- In office 23 February 1914 – 1915 Serving with Francisco García de Machón

Minister of Public Instruction, Finance and Public Credit of El Salvador
- In office 1898–1900 Serving with Tomás Regalado Romero

Minister of War and the Navy of El Salvador
- In office 1900–1901 Serving with Tomás Regalado Romero

Personal details
- Born: Antonio Fidel Novoa Meléndez; 24 April 1863 Sensuntepeque, El Salvador
- Died: 13 November 1922 (aged 59) Paris, France
- Resting place: Cemetery of Distinguished Citizens
- Party: Liberal; National Democratic Party
- Relatives: Constantino Fuentes Parra; Fidel Novoa Fuentes (son, 1900-1981); Ricardo Armando Novoa Arciniegas (grandson, 1931-2017)
- Education: Liceo Salvadoreño and University of El Salvador
- Occupation: Politician, physician and surgeon.

Fidel Antonio Novoa Meléndez (24 April 1863 – 13 November 1922) was a Salvadoran politician who was the president of the Legislative Assembly from 1903 to 1904 and again from 1912 to 1913.

== Early and personal life ==
In 1890, he obtained his doctorate with the thesis on The Influence of Prostitution on the Newborn.

== Political career ==
President of the Legislative Assembly of El Salvador (1903 and 1912) during the administration of Pedro José Escalón and Manuel Enrique Araujo and vice-president of the Legislative Assembly of El Salvador (1914) during the administration of Carlos Meléndez, in whose congressional seats he remained for several years, he also served as minister in the government portfolios of Public Instruction, Finance & Public Credit (Treasury Department), and War & Navy (Defense Department) during the administration of Tomás Regalado Romero. Legislative Assembly. From 29 April 1912 to 1913, Novoa Meléndez served as the president of the Legislative Assembly; political career he started in 1892 as Senator.

== Illness and death ==
Following a leg injury and complications due to diabetes, Melendez died in Paris on 13 November 1922.

Political offices
Preceded by Dionisio Aráuz	President of the Legislative Assembly; 1903–1904	Succeeded by Federico Mejía
Preceded by Rafael Pinto Figueroa	President of the Legislative Assembly; 1912–1913	Succeeded by Carlos Meléndez
Preceded by Manuel Enrique Araujo	Minister of Public Instruction, Finance and Public Credit of El Salvador; 1898	Succeeded by ?
Preceded by Manuel Enrique Araujo	Minister of War and the Navy of El Salvador; 1901	Succeeded by ?
