= Johanna Segovia =

Salvadoran marine ecologist (born 1982)

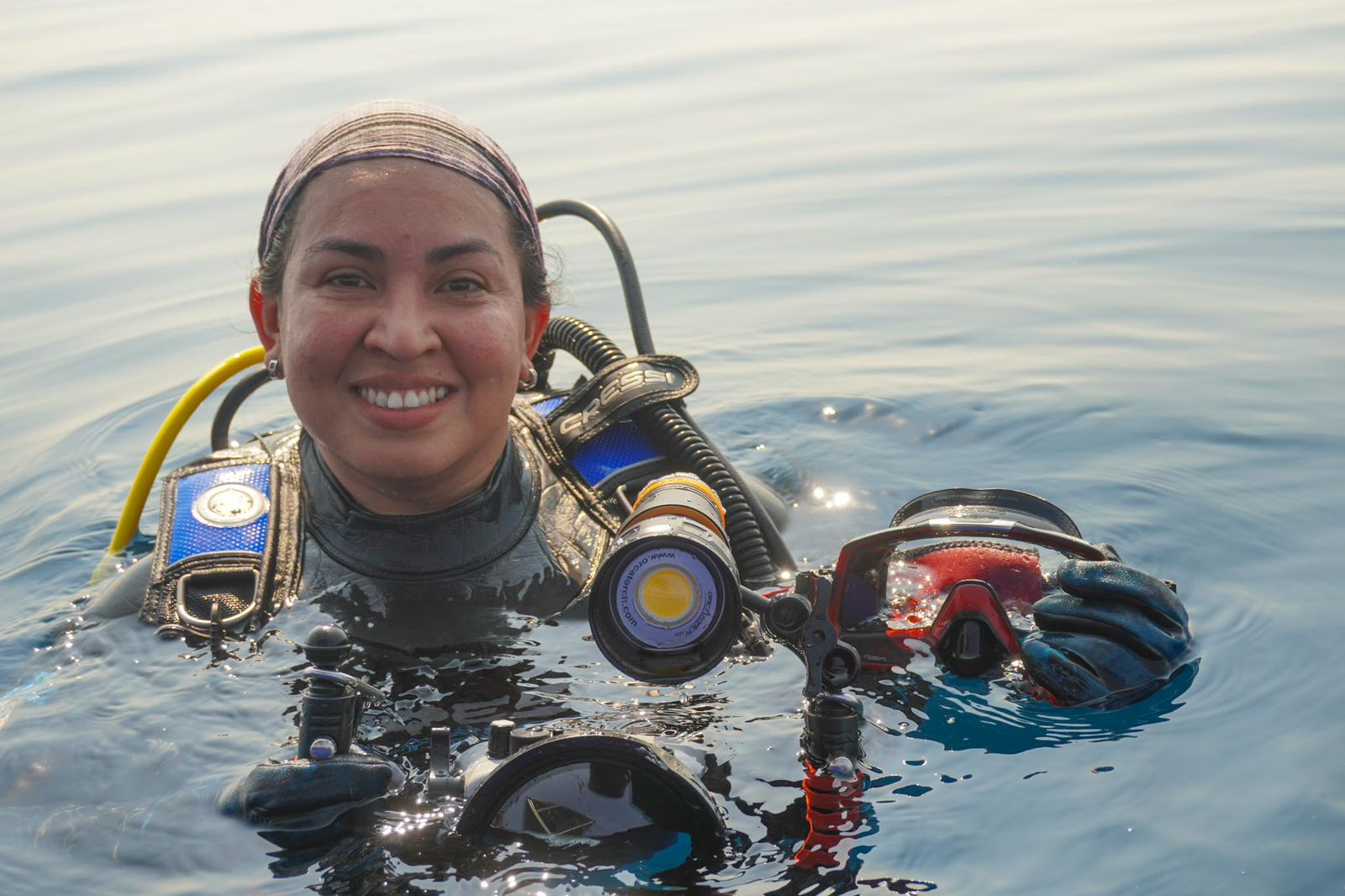
- Born: 27 June 1982 (age 44); San Salvador Department, El Salvador
- Education: University of El Salvador; University of Costa Rica
- Known for: Studies on reefs
- Scientific career
- Fields: Marine ecology
- Workplaces: Francisco Gavidia University

Johanna Vanesa Segovia (born 27 June 1982) is a Salvadoran marine ecologist and professor, recognised for her studies on reefs, the discoveries of extinct species of black coral and microplastics in crabs intended for human consumption in El Salvador.

== Early life and education ==
Segovia was born on 27 June 1982 in San Salvador Department, as the daughter of teachers. Her interest in the marine world began at an early age when she observed small animals trapped in tide pools and developed an admiration for American oceanographer Sylvia Earle.

She graduated with a degree in biology from the University of El Salvador, obtained a Master of Science in biology with a specialisation in ecology from the University of Costa Rica in 2012, as well as a diploma in marine science education from the Distance State University (UNET) and science communication from the National Council for Science and Technology (CONACYT).

== Career ==
Segovia works at the Marine and Limnological Research Centre (CYMARyL), at the Institute of Science, Technology and Innovation (ICTI) and at the Francisco Gavidia University (UFG).

Segovia registered for the first time the presence of Glaucus atlanticus in the country in 2015.

She joined the Organization for Women in Science for the Developing World in 2020.

She warned in an interview in 2021 on damage to coral reefs in Central America, stating that the degradation of coral ecosystems directly affects fishing communities and pointed out that factors such as climate change, coral bleaching, pollution and unregulated fishing pose significant threats to the country's marine biodiversity.

In April 2022, the team she led discovered the existence of a mesophotic reef in the Los Cóbanos Marine Protected Area in El Salvador. The discovery was remarkable in that less than ten years earlier, black coral was considered extinct in the country. The reef was made up of black coral Antipathes galapagensis, a species of coral never before recorded in the country, Myriopathes panamensis, and several Octocorallia.

In 2023, Segovia was part of the discovery of dead cell debris and microplastics in crabs intended for consumption in El Salvador during the first phase, which consisted of extracting the contents of the stomachs of seven crabs to be disintegrated with hydrogen peroxide.

The United Nations Office at Geneva recognised Segovia in 2024 for its contribution to the achievement of Sustainable Development Goal 14 on the conservation and sustainable use of oceans, seas and marine resources.

== Publications ==
- Biodiversity at the ecosystem level in patches of hermatypic corals (2007)
- Record of Glaucus atlanticus on the coast of El Salvador, Central American Pacific.
- Excavating sponges of the Central American Pacific, descriptions and faunal record (2018)
- Richness and distribution of echinoderms on the rocky reefs of Punta Amapala and Los Cóbanos, El Salvador (2017)
- Ecosistemas Acuáticos de El Salvador. UFG Editores, 2021.
- Black coral forests and associated organisms in the mesophotic zone of Los Cóbanos, El Salvador (2023)
