= Liceo Salvadoreño =

Coordinates: 13.7020°N 89.2099°W

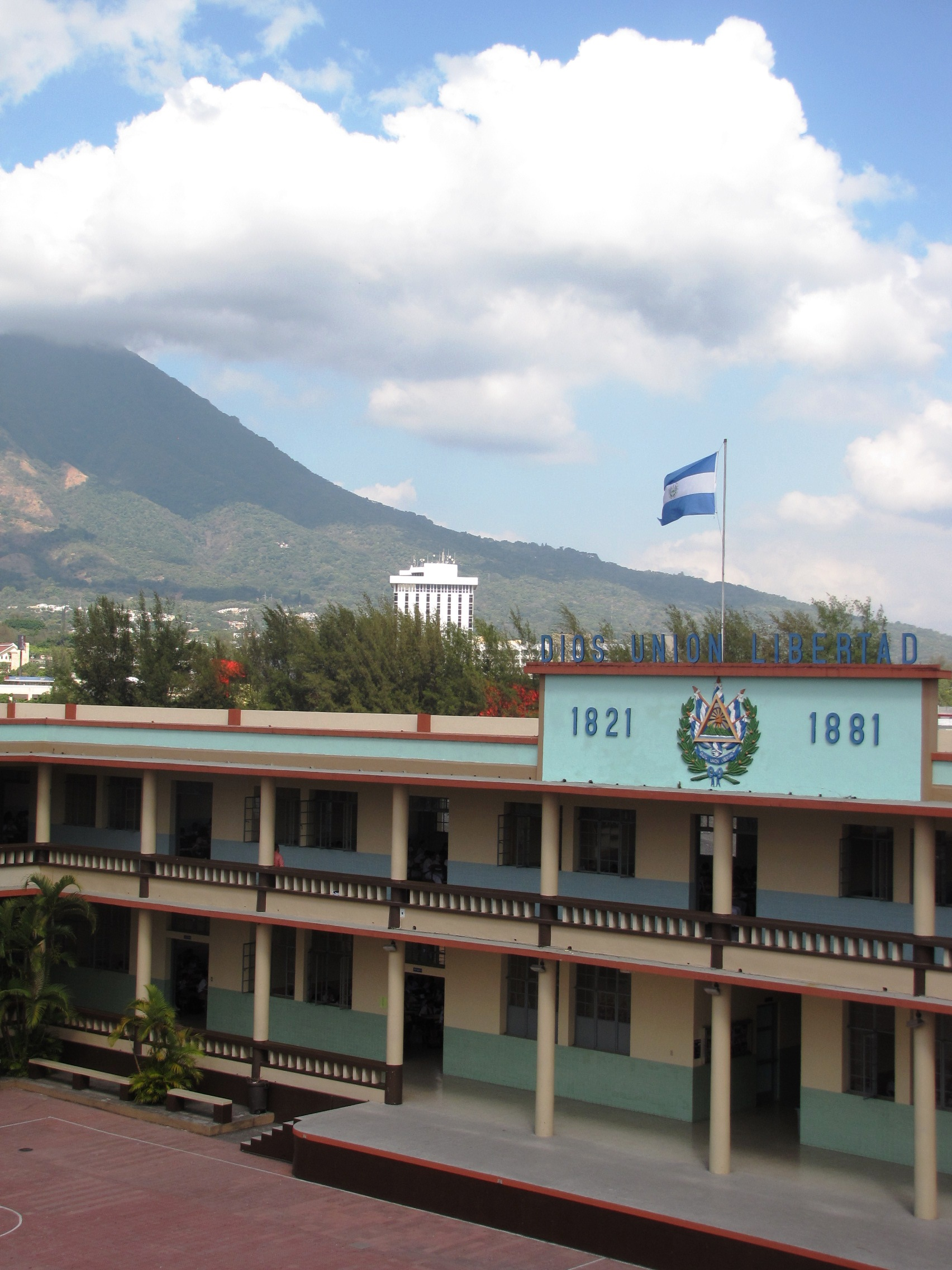

Location
- San Salvador, El Salvador

Information
- Type: Private, Catholic (Marist)
- Motto: "Todo a Jesús por María, a María para Jesús"
- Established: 1881
- Color(s): White and blue

Liceo Salvadoreño is a private Catholic educational institution located in San Salvador, El Salvador. The school has been under the guidance of the Marist Brothers (Italy) since 1924.

The school has over 2,500 students divided in two shifts, one for elementary and middle school students in the morning and one for high school students in the afternoon.

The school has the reputation of being an elite school when it comes to education and sports (their men's basketball team has won 34 national titles as well as in track and field and soccer) and its students have received the highest scores in the Learning and Academic Aptitude Test (PAES for its initials in Spanish) since the test's first application in 1997.

Many Ex Liceistas (as their alumni are known) have become important personalities in El Salvador, including the writer Salvador Salazar Arrue (best known as Salarrué), former San Salvador Mayor Fidel Antonio Novoa Arciniegas, former president José Napoleón Duarte, former 1903 and 1912 president of the Legislative Assembly Fidel Antonio Novoa Meléndez, former 1929 congressman of the Legislative Assembly Fidel Antonio Novoa Fuentes, former 1989 Judge of the Supreme Court of Justice and writer Ricardo Armando Novoa Arciniegas and many other Salvadoran politicians and businessmen.
