= Juan María Villatoro Medrano =

Salvadoran Congressman and Attorney

Deputy of the Legislative Assembly of El Salvador
- In office 1888–1889 Serving with José Dolores Larreynaga Ayala
- Preceded by: José Valle Rodríguez
- Succeeded by: José Rocas Pacas Pineda

Magistrate of the Supreme Court of Justice of El Salvador
- In office 1883–1884 Serving with José Trigueros
- Preceded by: Cruz Ulloa
- Succeeded by: Antonio Ruiz

Personal details
- Born: June 24, 1847 El Sauce, La Unión, El Salvador
- Died: December 2, 1924 (aged 77) San Salvador, El Salvador

Juan María Villatoro Medrano (June 24, 1847 – December 2, 1924) was a Salvadoran congressman, attorney, notary, and magistrate of the Supreme Court of Justice of El Salvador.

== Early life ==
Juan María Villatoro Medrano was born on June 24, 1847, in El Sauce, La Unión, El Salvador.

Corte Suprema de Justicia de El Salvador (1924). "Revista judicial: publicación quincenal de la Corte Suprema de Justicia". Revista judicial (in Spanish). Imprenta Nacional.

== Political and judicial career ==
Between 1869 and 1888, he served as a deputy of the Ordinary Legislatures of El Salvador.

He was also a deputy during the Constitutional Assemblies of 1871 and 1872–1873, and again in 1883, where he served as secretary to the board of directors.

In August 1876, he served as Second Judge of San Miguel.

He later held positions as a substitute magistrate of the Court of Casación and as a magistrate of the Supreme Court of Justice of El Salvador, serving in December 1883 and January 1886.

He also served as Judge of San Miguel in September 1886.
