= Galician diaspora =

Galician: Diáspora Galega

Languages
- Galician, Spanish, English, French, German, Portuguese, etc.

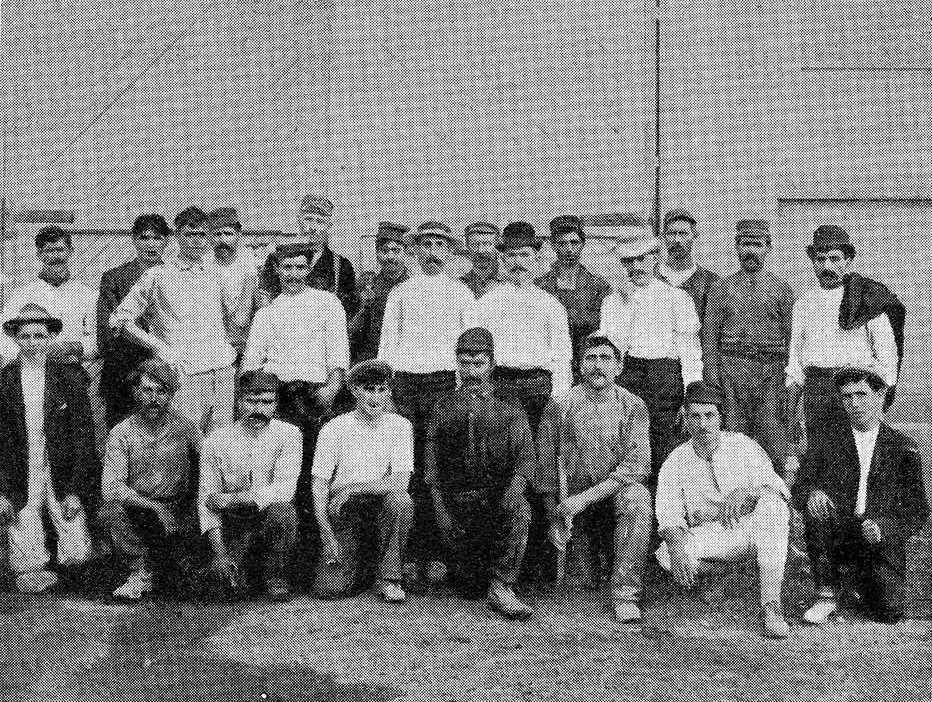
Galician laborers working for the Edison Portland Cement Company in New Village, New Jersey, in 1910.

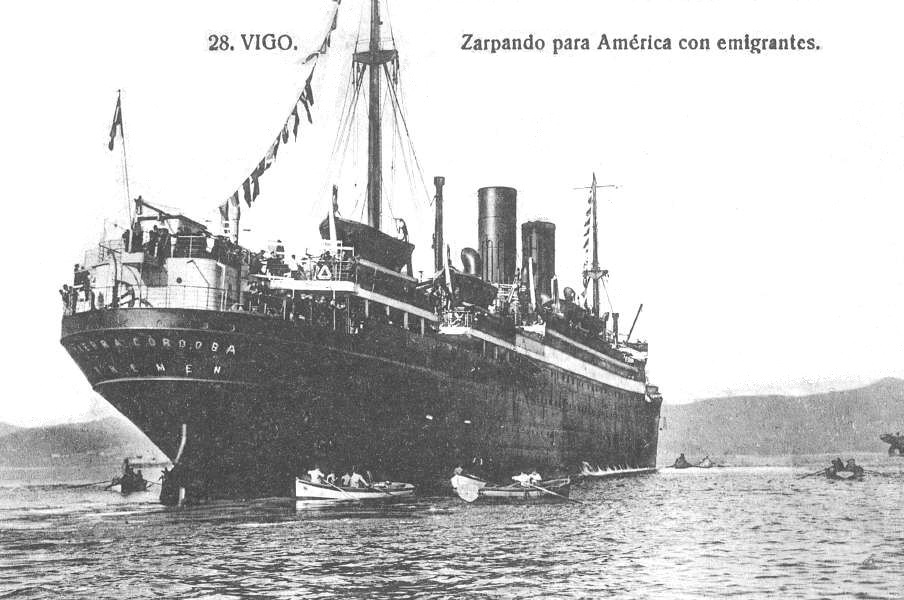
Sierra Córdoba in Vigo, departing for America with emigrants.

The Galician diaspora is the ethnically Galician population outside of Galicia. The concept does not usually include the ethnic Galicians who live as natives in Spain or the adjacent country of Portugal.

Massive emigration of the Galician people occurred during the last three decades of the 19th century until well into the mid-20th century. Between 1850 and 1960, over two million Galicians emigrated to America. This phenomenon had a significant impact in the socio-economic, political, and cultural contexts of both territorial Galicia and the Galician diaspora.

== Background ==
Historian Antonio Eiras Roel estimates that between 1836 and 1960, 2,041,603 Galicians emigrated to America, which accounted for 38.5% of the total Spanish migrants (5,311,906). This made Galicia have an emigration rate per thousand inhabitants higher than that of Ireland during the peak periods of migration.

Subsequently, in the second decade of the 21st century, due to the economic crisis in Galicia and Spain, a second wave of Galician emigration began, primarily to European countries such as Germany and England. This new wave of emigration is typically composed of young people with education and a medium to high cultural level.

== See also ==
- Galician Americans
- Spanish diaspora
