= Enrico Massi =

Italian aviator

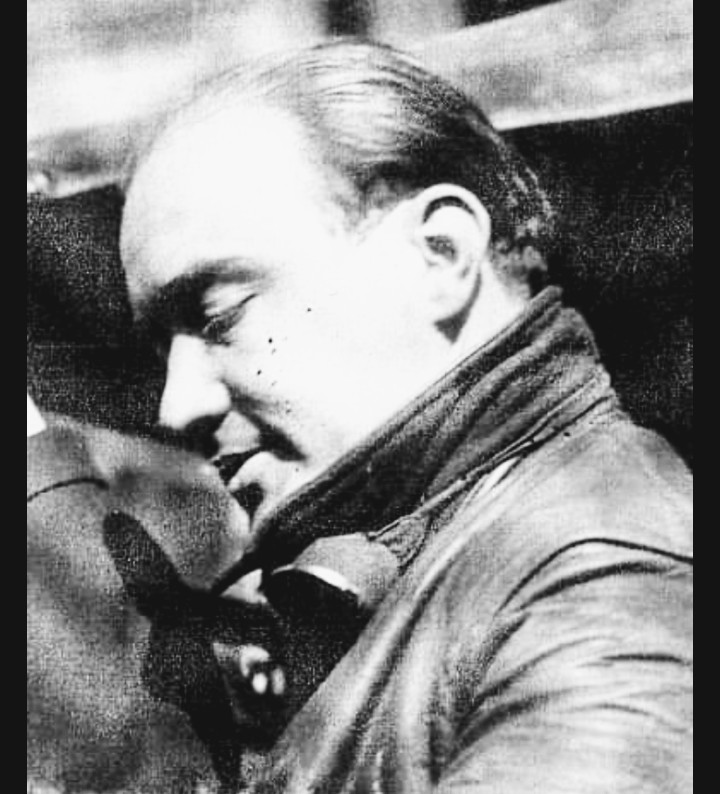
- Born: 29 October 1897; Naples, Italy
- Died: 4 October 1923 (aged 25); Soyapango, El Salvador

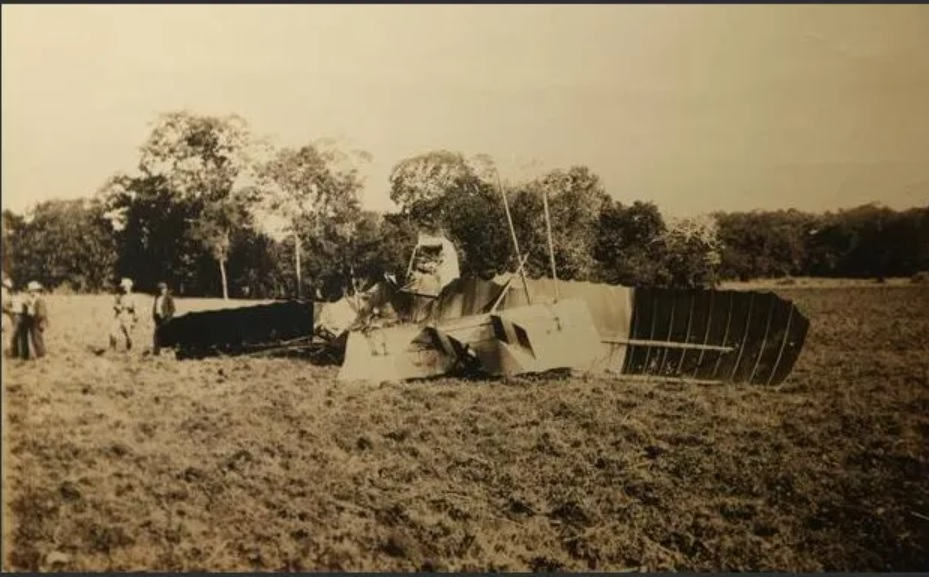
The Caudron G.3 involved in the fatal accident that killed Massi

Enrico Massi (29 October 1897 – 4 October 1923) was an Italian aviator. He is considered a pioneer of aviation in El Salvador.

== Biography ==
His parents were Augusto Massi and Carlota Pascarella. In World War I he was a pilot and flight instructor for the Italian Royal Navy, and after the conflict, he worked as a test pilot in the Monte Celio experiment field. Later he made acrobatic presentations in Africa and Asia with Mario D'Urso, and in 1922 he was hired by Fiat S.p.A. again as a test pilot. In same year he arrived in the American continent along with other Italians at the invitation of the Honduran government, to form an aviation school, but this objective was not met.

On 4 October 1923, he was conducting an instruction flight with Juan Ramón Munés in a Caudron G.3 when the plane suffered an engine failure and crashed at 11:30 in the Venice farm in Soyapango. Munés survived, but Massi was killed. He was buried with all the honors, and a national mourning was decreed in the country.
