= Chapeltique =

- Municipality
- Location in El Salvador
- Coordinates: 13°38′N 88°16′W
- Country: El Salvador
- Department: San Miguel Department
- Elevation: 604 ft (184 m)

Population
  - Total: 17,000
  - Density: 2,680/sq mi (1,036/km^{2})

Chapeltique is a municipality in the San Miguel department of El Salvador.

Chapeltique, a small town, is 25 minutes from San Miguel, with a population of 17,000 inhabitants. The town has expanded rapidly within the last 15 years. It has a Catholic church of "Big J" that was built in 1821.
