= Cemetery of Distinguished Citizens =

Cemetery in San Salvador

Coordinates: 13°41′41″N 89°11′57″W

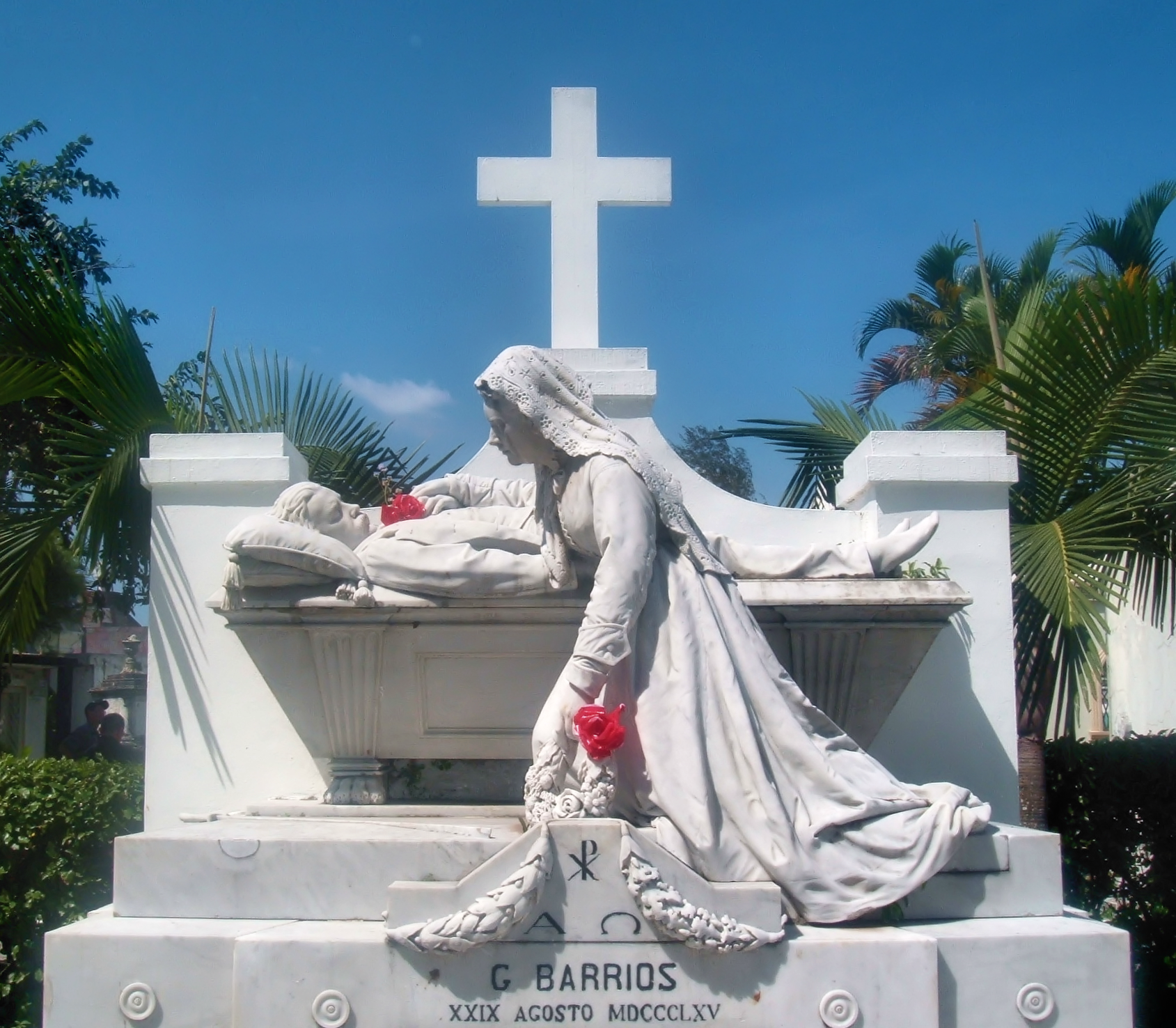
Sculptures of Captain General Gerardo Barrios and his wife, Adelaida Guzmán de Barrios, at the soldier's tomb

The Cemetery of Distinguished Citizens (Spanish, Cementerio de los Ilustres) is a cemetery located in San Salvador and together with the Cemetery of La Barmeja, it forms the Cemetery General in San Salvador. It is the burial place of prominent families of the capital of El Salvador and many outstanding figures from the history of this country.

== General ==
The cemetery was blessed by Bishop Tomás Occeli on August 26, 1849, as the first civil cemetery in El Salvador. This place contains the mausoleum of the president of the Federal Republic of Central America, Francisco Morazán, whose remains had been transferred from Costa Rica. However, in 1882, during the administration of President Rafael Zaldívar, a second mausoleum of the liberal caudillo was erected, since the first one had been damaged by the earthquake of 1873. The name of the area was changed to “Pantheon of Great Men” in 1913, after the burial of the president Manuel Enrique Araujo, but over time it ended up being known as “The Distinguished Citizens”.

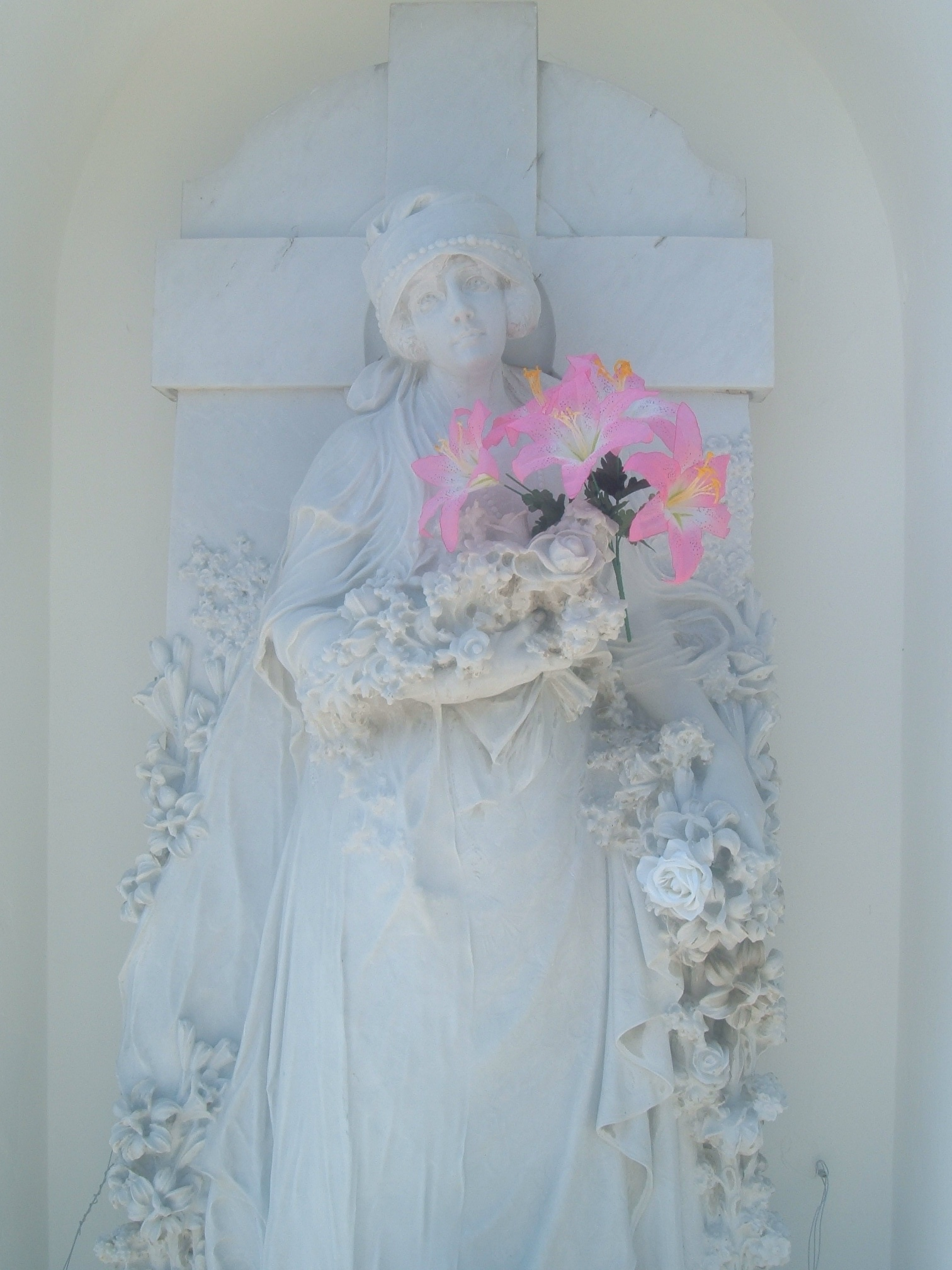
The Bride

The cemetery houses various white marble sculptures and mausoleums of artistic value that keep the remains of members of wealthy families in San Salvador. Many of the works were requested abroad, especially in Genoa, Italy, and made in Europe by artists such as Francisco Durini. Various angel figures are found in different poses; religious scenes such as The Pietà; some of the monumental size and others with peculiar characteristics denote the status of the family or the life history of the deceased. Many of them have become part of the landscape of the place and popular memory. Among them it is worth mentioning the figure of Luperca breastfeeding Romulo and Remus in the mausoleum of the Assistenza Italiana (popularly called "The She-Wolf"). And another famous one, “The Bride”, is a sculpture by Lidia S. Cristales de López, who died in 1924, six months after their marriage.

Some of the most important graves are:

- Enrico Massi
- Francisco Morazán
- Gerardo Barrios (National Monument)
- Salvador Mendieta
- Manuel Enrique Araujo
- Arturo Ambrogi
- Alfredo Espino
- Benjamin Bloom
- Schafik Hándal
- Roberto d'Aubuisson
- Salvador Salazar Arrué, "Salarrué"
- Agustín Barrios Mangoré (National Monument)
- Morena Celarié
- Jacobo Árbenz (buried between 1971 and 1995, later repatriated to Guatemala)

== Gallery ==
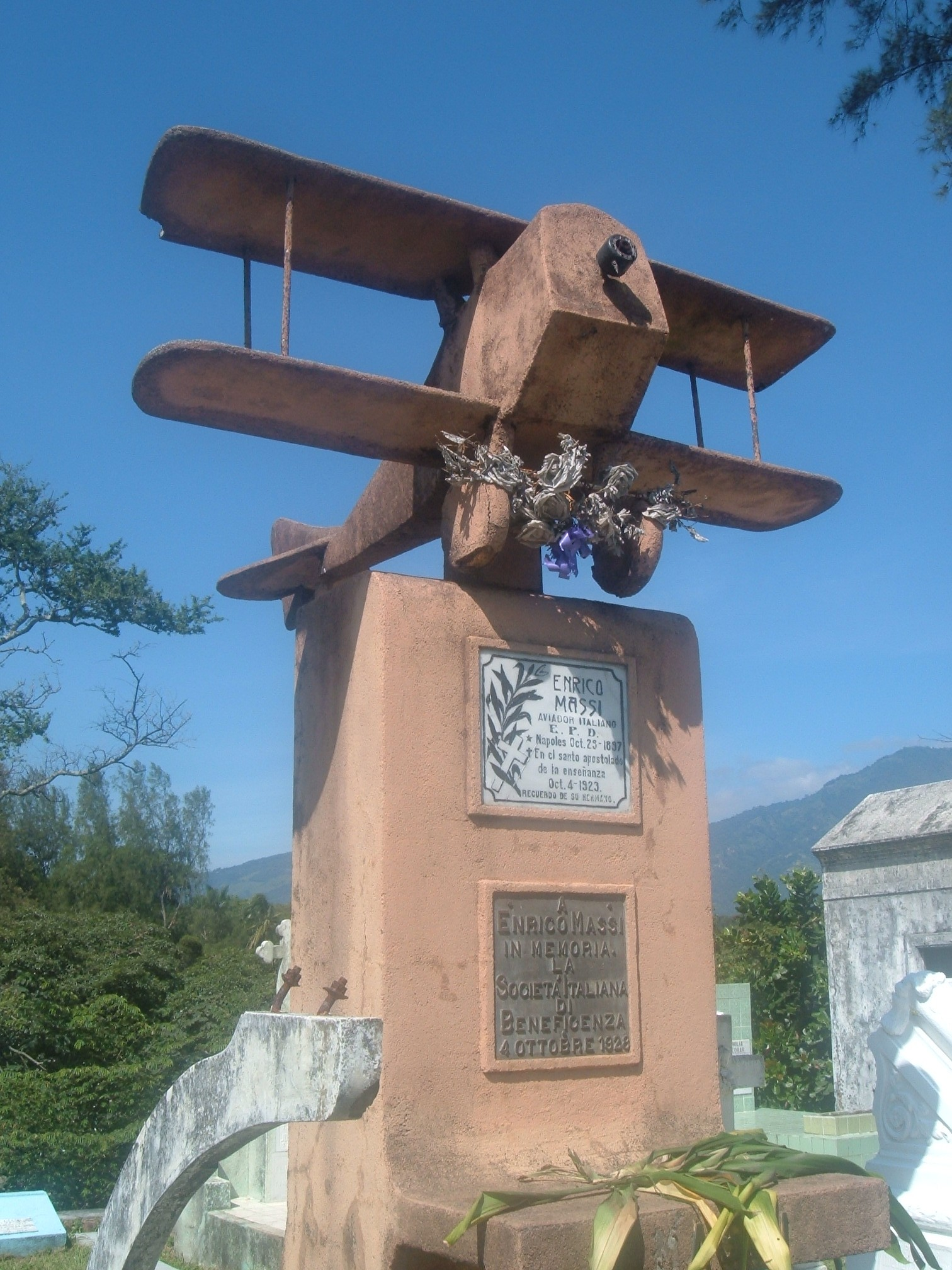
Tomb of Enrico Massi

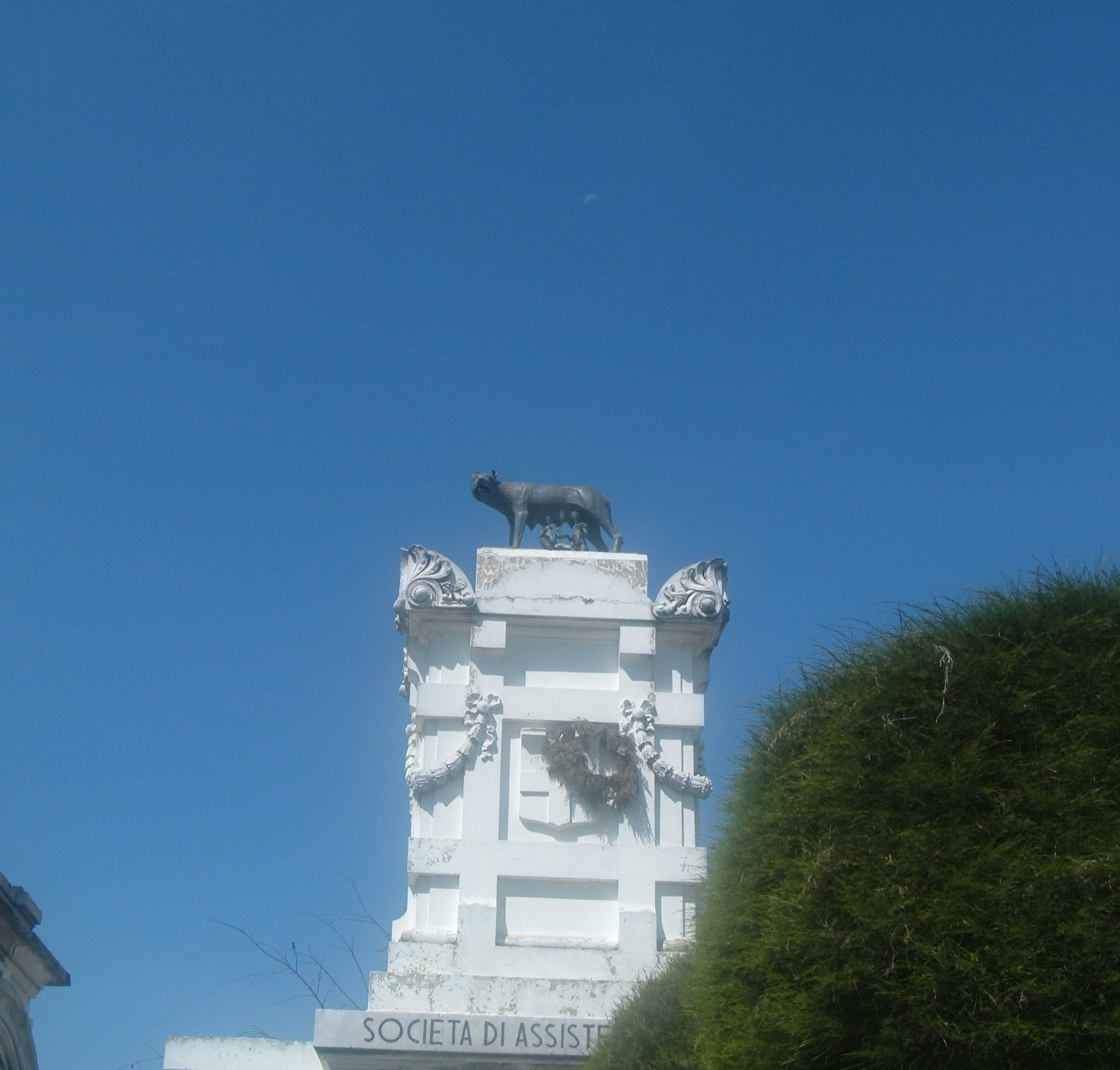
"Mausoleum of the Asistenzza Italiana, The she-wolf feeding Romulo and Remo"

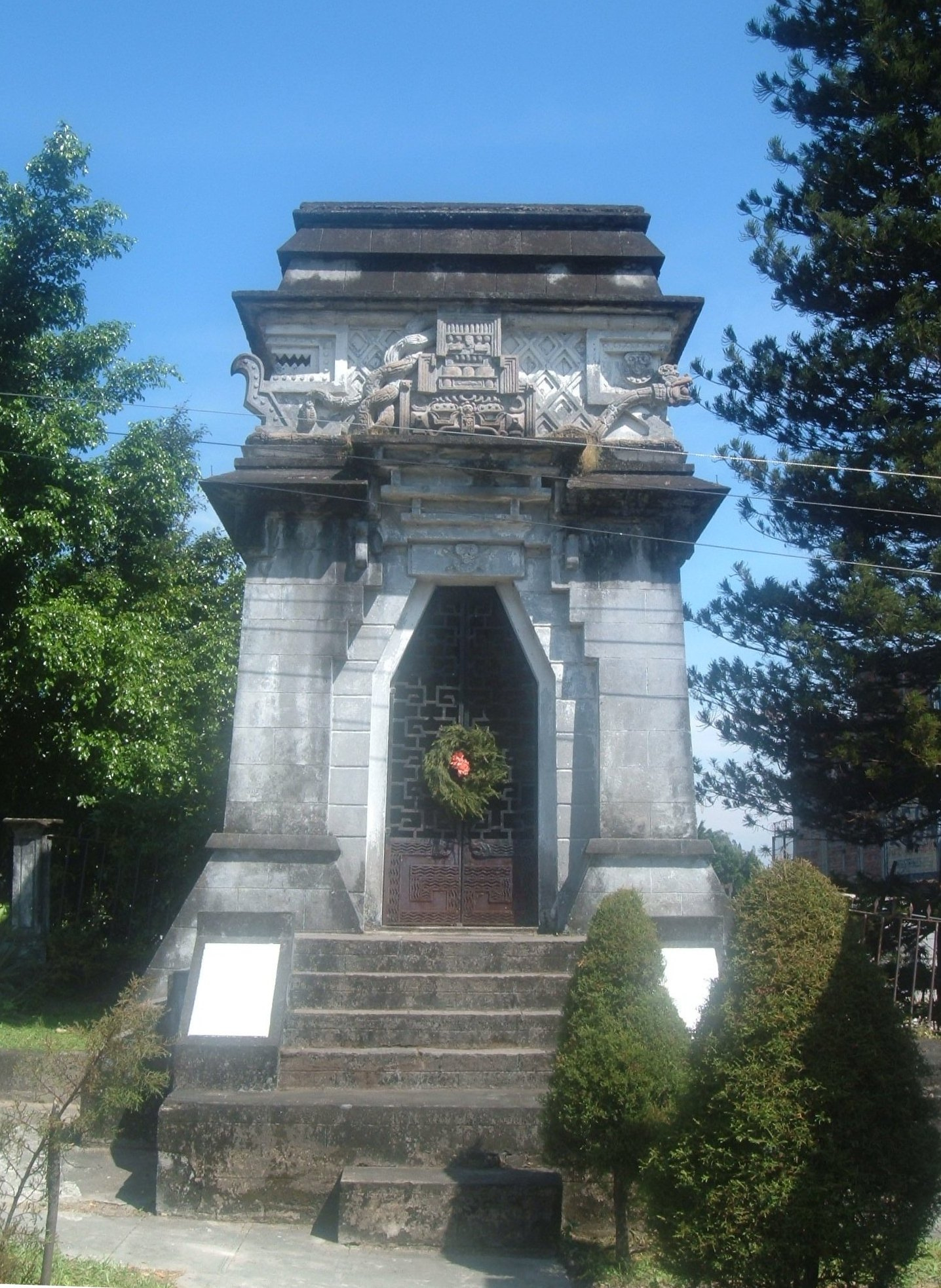
Tomb with Mayan motives

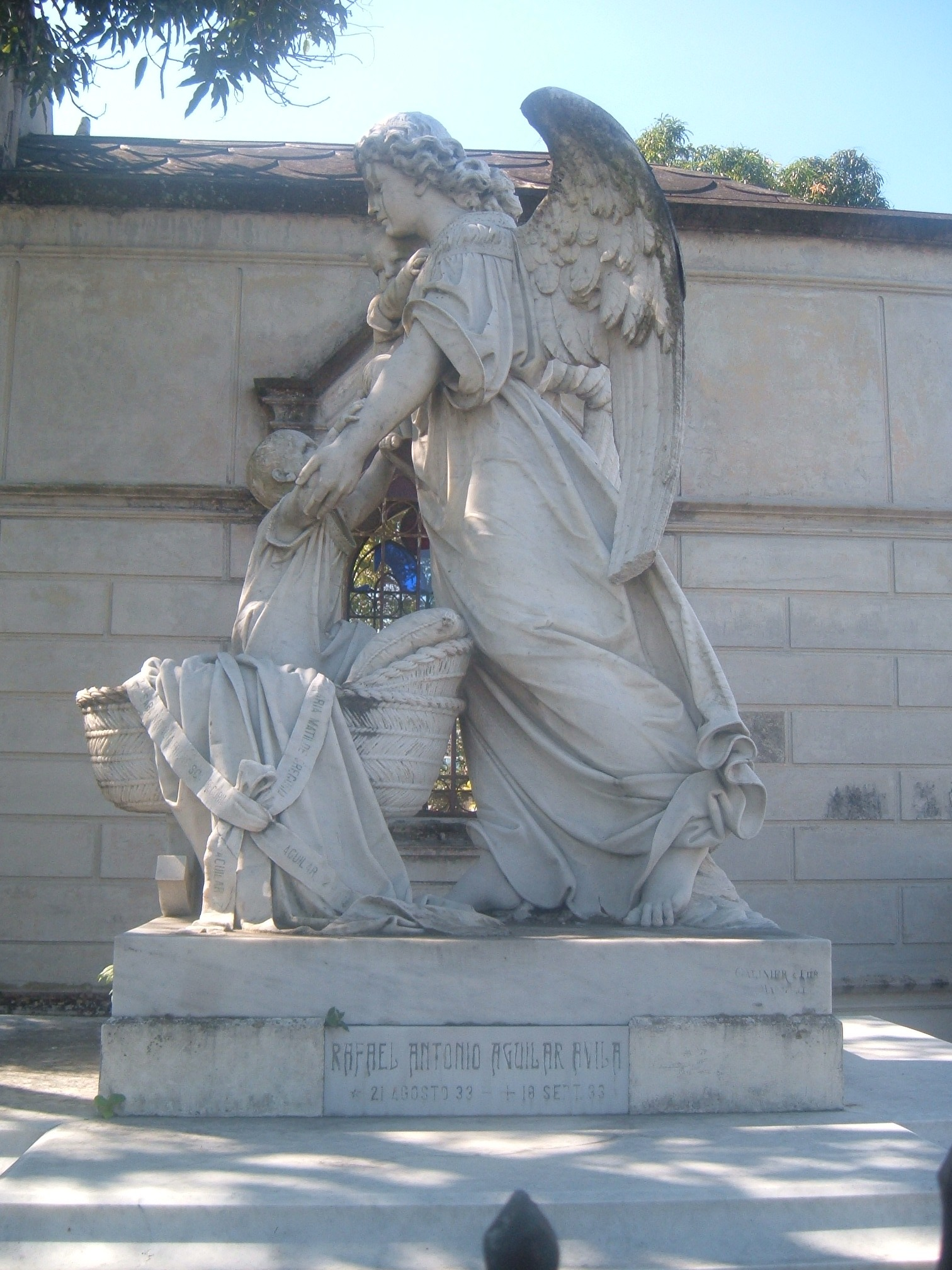
"The Twins"

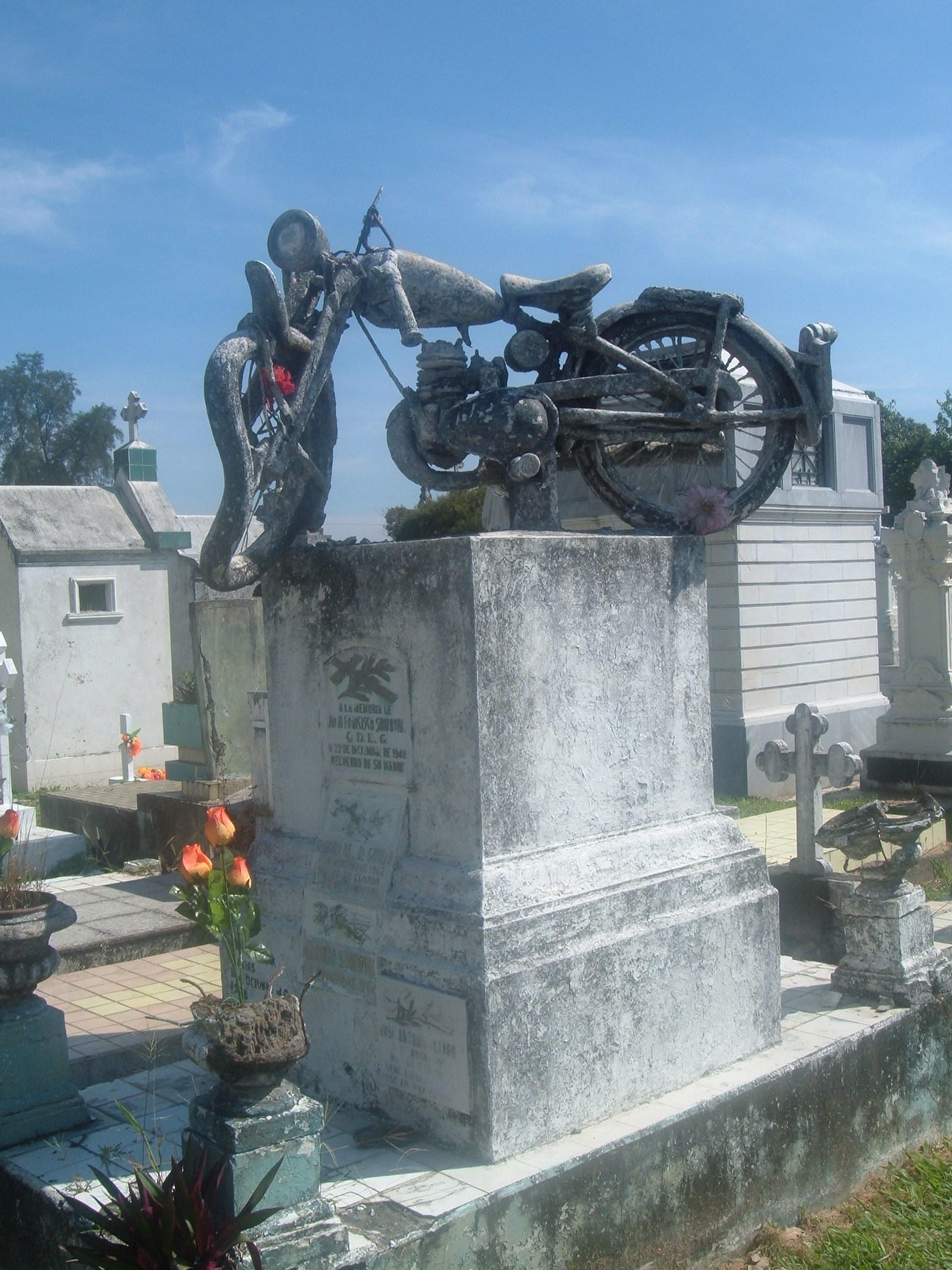
Motorcycle on top of a grave

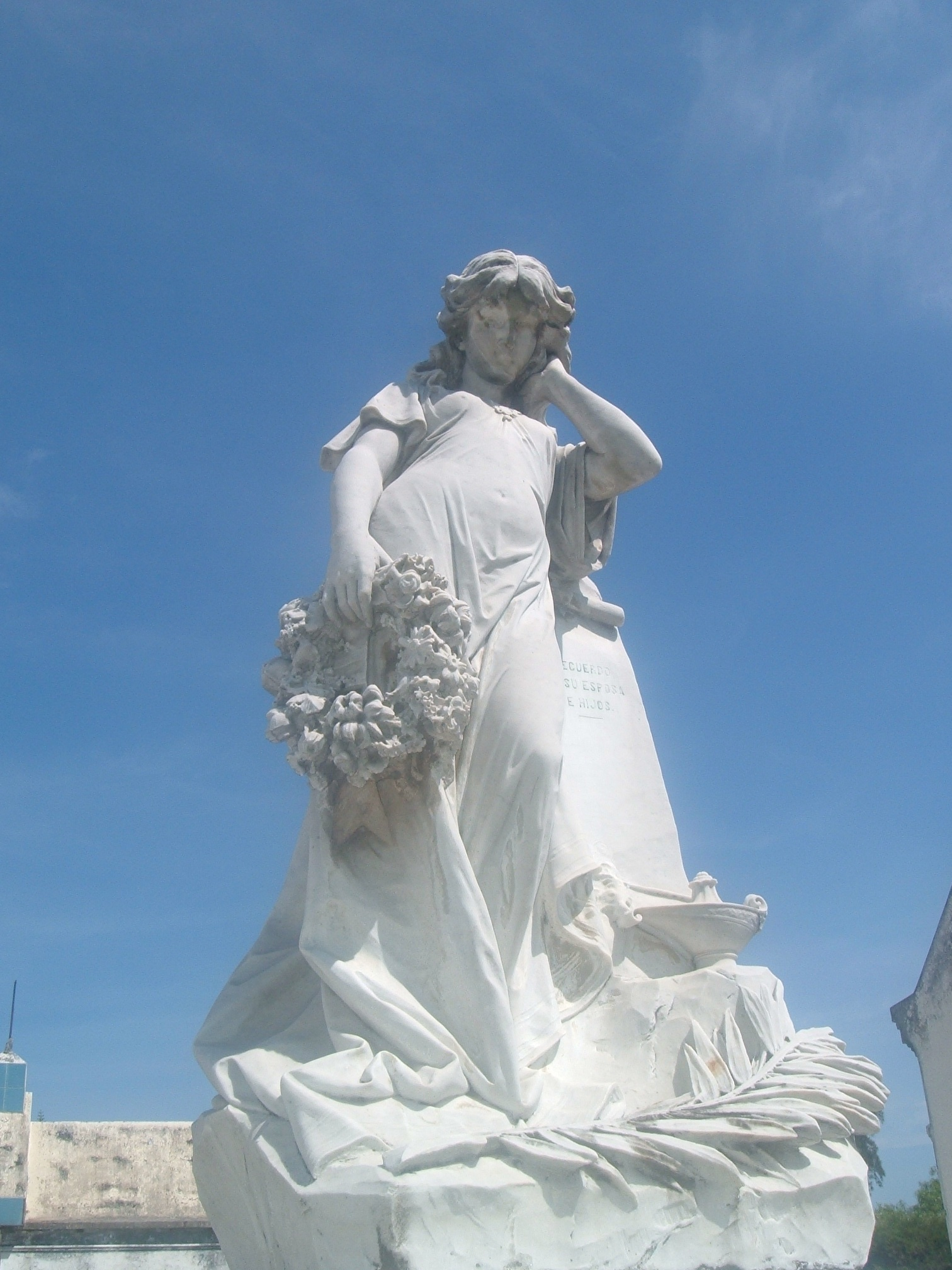
Angel in a meditative pose

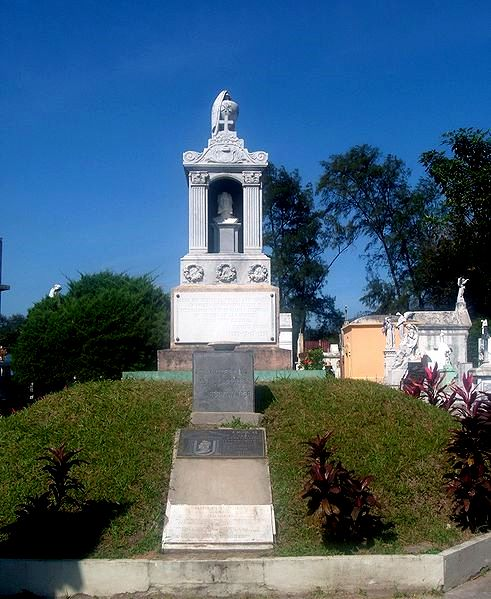
Tomb of Francisco Morazán

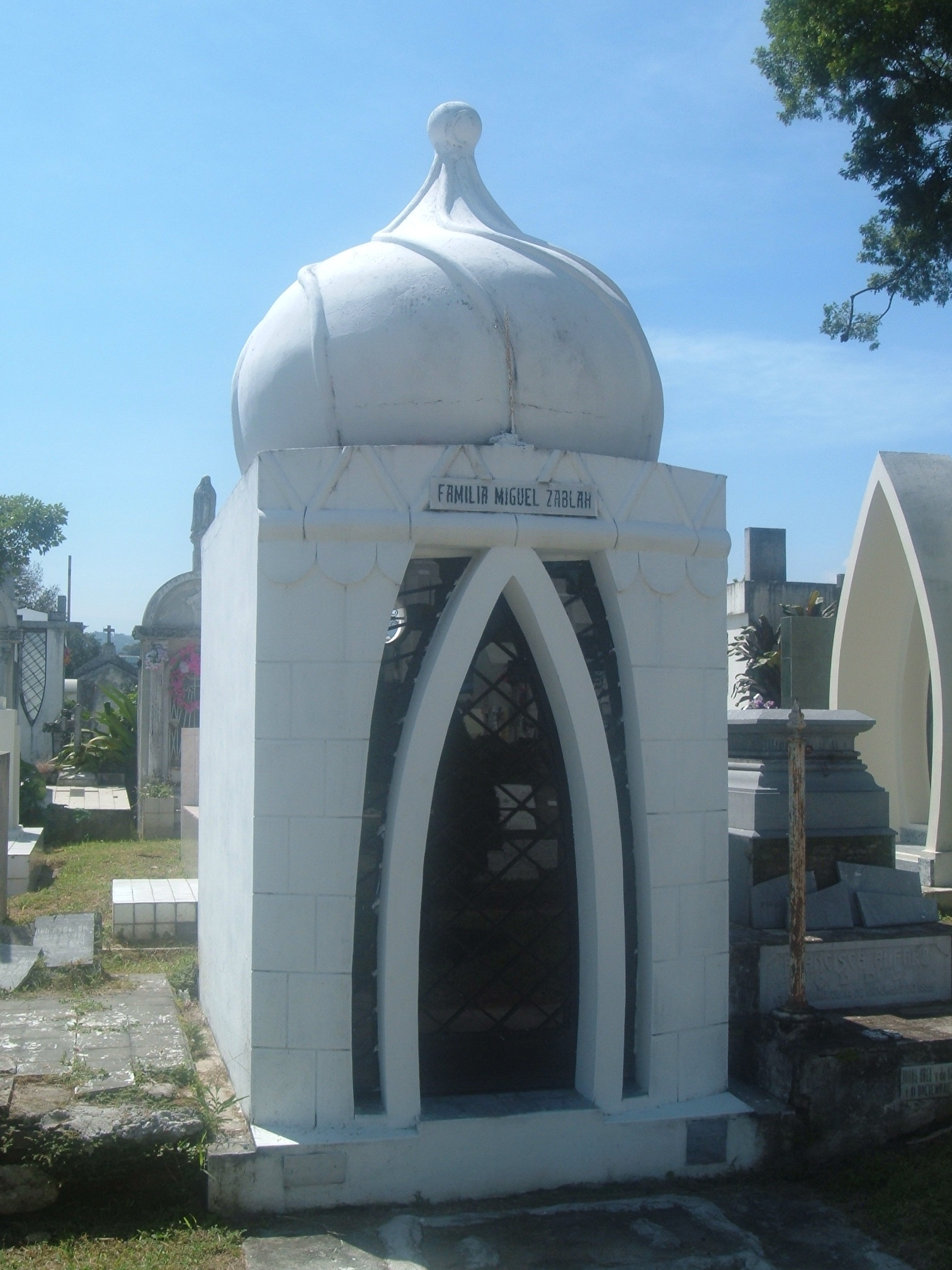
Tomb with Arabic motifs

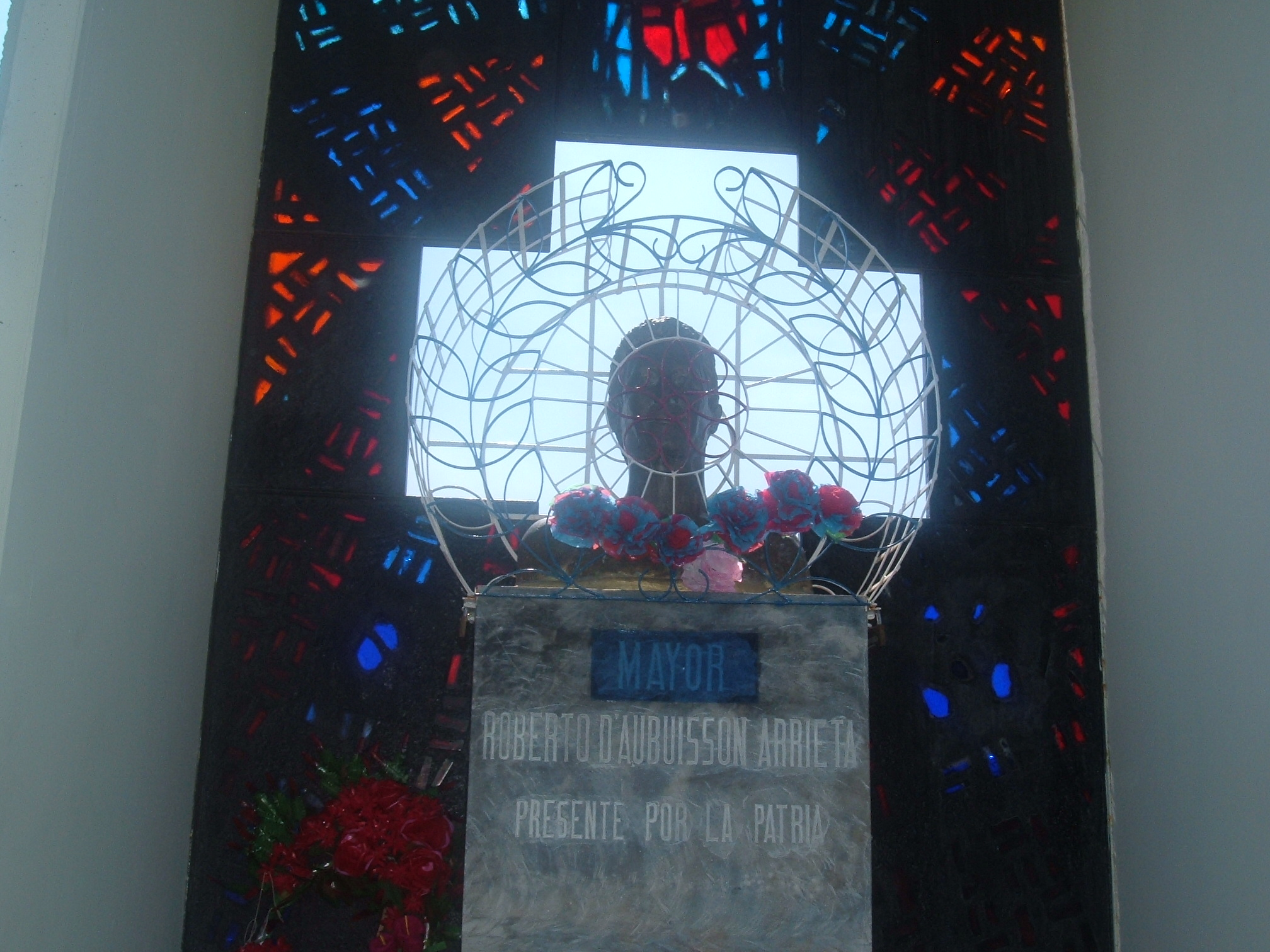
Tomb of Roberto d'Aubuisson

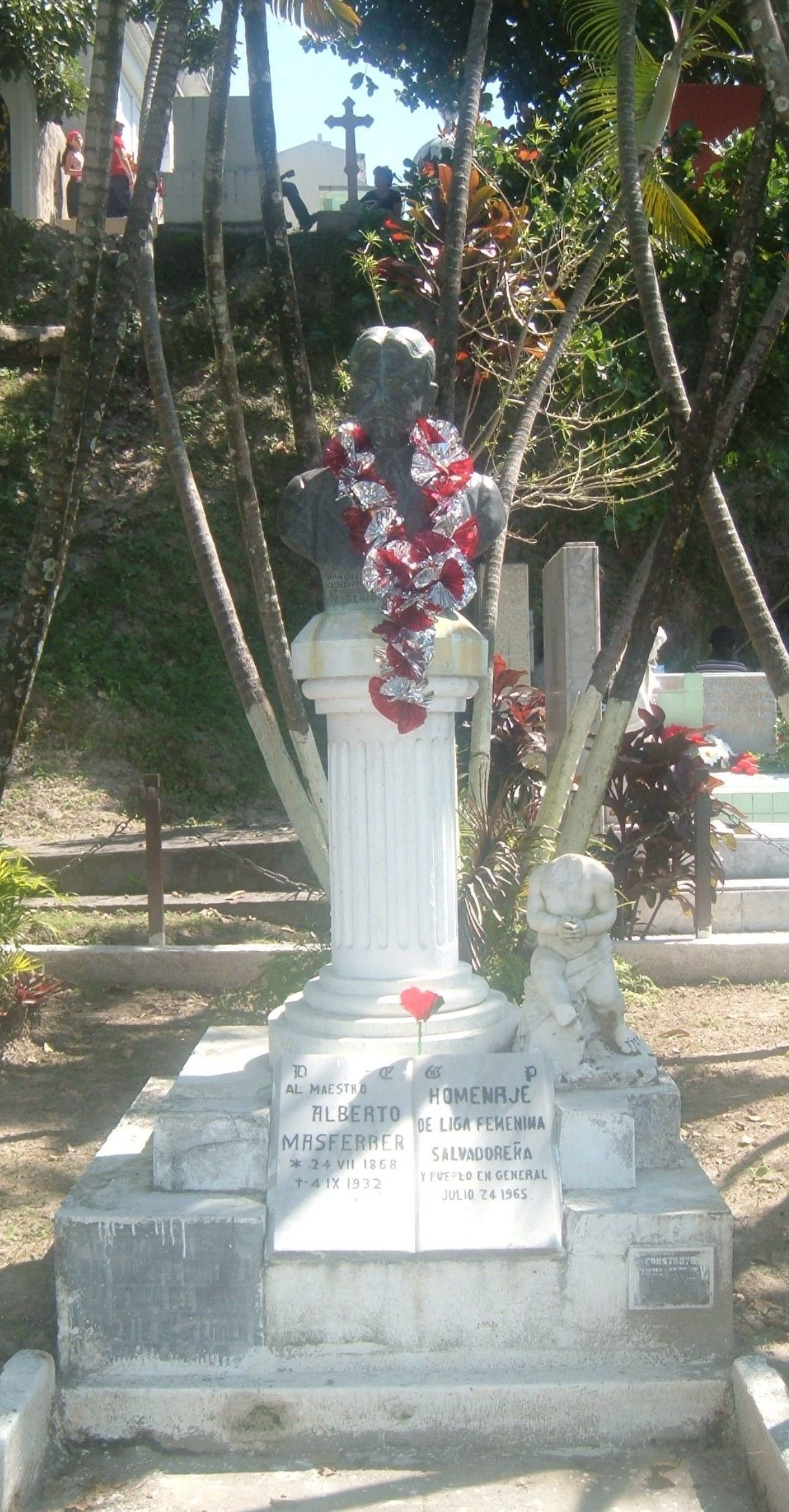
Tomb of Alberto Masferrer
