= University of El Salvador =

Public university of El Salvador

Coordinates: 13.7183°N 89.2031°W

- Universidad de El Salvador (Spanish)
- Seal of the University of El Salvador
- Other name: "La Nacional"
- Motto: Hacia la libertad por la cultura (Spanish)
- Motto in English: Towards freedom through culture
- Type: Public
- Established: 16 February 1841; 185 years ago
- Rector: Roger Armando Arias Alvarado
- Students: 53,682
- Location: San Salvador, El Salvador
- Campus: Urban
- Calendar: Semester
- Website: www.ues.edu.sv

The University of El Salvador (UES) is the oldest and the most prominent university institution in El Salvador. It serves as the national university of the country. The main campus, Ciudad Universitaria, is located in the capital of San Salvador, but there are also branches of the university in other Salvadoran cities such as Santa Ana, San Miguel and San Vicente. The university counts a total of 9 faculties in its main campus and has a student population of more than 50,000.

== History ==
The University of El Salvador was founded on February 16, 1841 by the President Juan Lindo, as an initiative of the Gral. Francisco Malespin and the priest Crisanto Salazar, with the objective of providing a centre for further education for the Salvadoran youth.

Throughout much of its existence, the university has had a precarious existence, in the earlier years characterised by lack of governmental support and funding. In the 1950s, the University of El Salvador faced opposition from the authoritarian government of the country and many of the students and university professors were victims of the military repression. In the 1970s student uprisings took place. On July 19, 1972, the government of Colonel Arturo Armando Molina intervened at the university to suppress the student uprising with military action. During the period of occupation, that extended until the end of 1973, the university campus was occupied by troops. When the university reopened, a campaign against the university community began, accusing it to be a center of Marxist indoctrination. In the following years, hundreds of students, university professors, and university authorities faced government repression, and in October 1980, the university's chancellor, Felix Ulloa, was assassinated.

On June 26, 1980, the university was once again occupied by the Armed Forces, having begun a period of four years in exile. The earthquake of 10 October 1986, seriously damaged the infrastructure of the University in San Salvador. Until the end of Civil War of El Salvador (1980–1992), the UES underwent a period of decay.

In 1991, with the election of Dr. Fabio Castillo, a period of recovery of the university began. Under the administration of María Isabel Rodríguez, who served from 1999 to 2007, the university reached out to the government, and campus's infrastructure was improved.

Since 2013, the university faces a critical situation due to a budget deficit of $6.5 million until 2015.

=== Current events ===
On July 6, 2005, there was a student movement against the government of President Elias Antonio Saca Gonzalez for the possibility of allowing an increase in fare of public transport. The youth protest ended in a pitched battle between riot police and protesters outside the main entrance of the UES that left several people injured and property damage. Almost exactly a year later, on July 5, 2006, a new student march was carried out against the government of Antonio Saca, but this time as a sign of dissatisfaction when knowing the approval of an increase to the rate of passage city bus, which culminated in the outside the central campus of the UES, where there was a shootout between some protesters and police. In the gun battle, died two members of the National Civil Police (PNC, in Spanish) and several riot police were injured. This case were tried and convicted the protesters José Mario Belloso Castillo and Luis Antonio Herrador Funes, respectively, as author and accomplice of the homicide of both police officers.

During these events, PNC snipers were injuring a university employee and fired at the buildings of the UES. As a result of these events, the UES was closed for the next six days while the PNC raided their premises for evidence against those responsible for the death of the two riot police. By an attack armed police officers, the government of Antonio Saca directly blamed the FMLN of having planned these riots, due to the fact that the author of the shots and his accomplice were affiliated to this political party. FMLN, however, publicly rejected the accusation and one detached from the violent actions committed by the same militants involved in the murder of both riot police. Later the own president Antonio Saca retracted of having done this accusation. Meanwhile, UES split from these events and considers that the actions of the PNC violated their university autonomy.

== Faculties ==
The main faculties of the university follows:

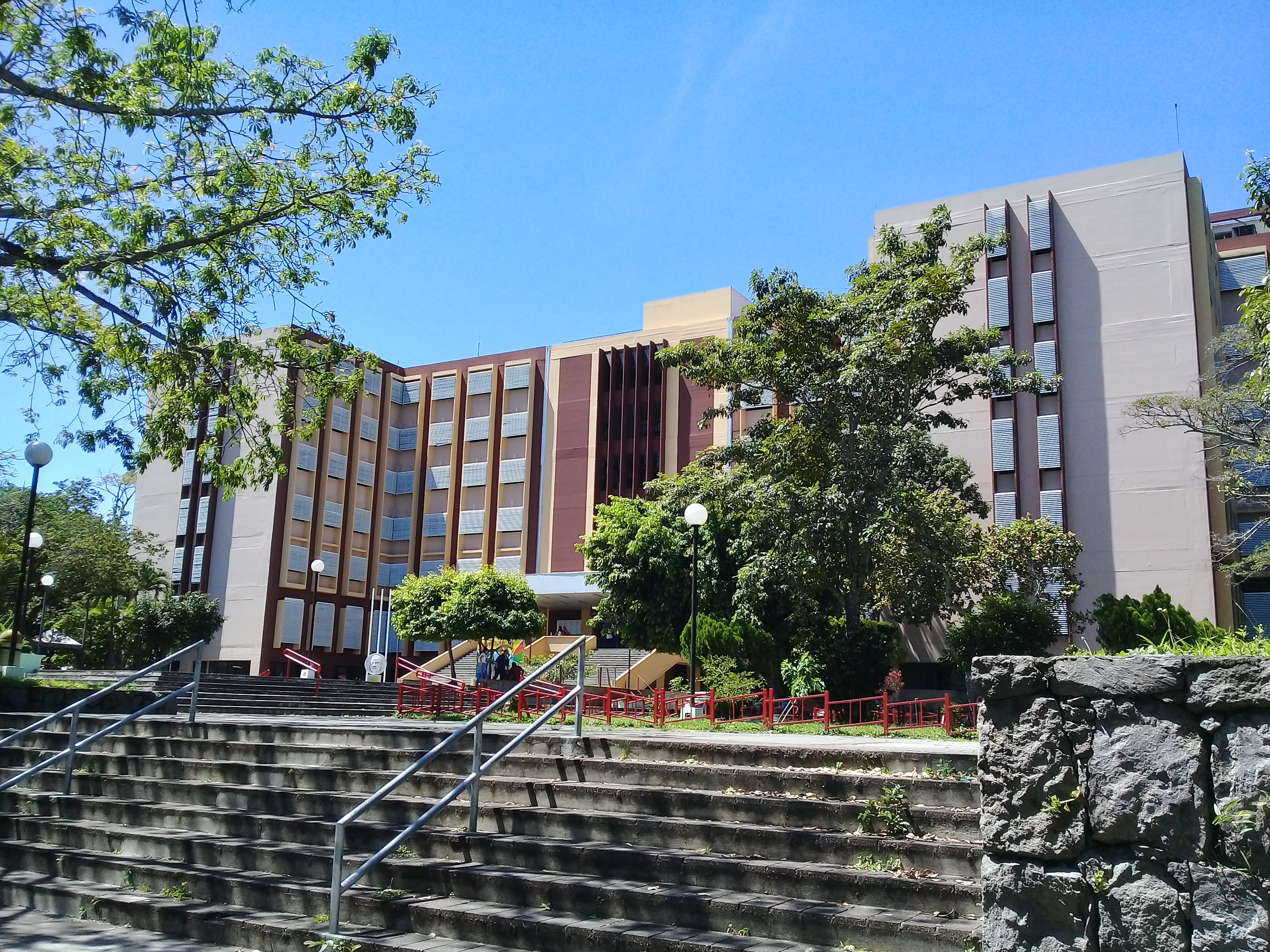
Main building of the School of Medicine of the University of El Salvador

=== San Salvador Central Campus ===
- Faculty of Agronomy
- Faculty of Economic Sciences
- Faculty of Science and Humanistics
- Faculty of Natural Sciences and Mathematics
- Faculty of Engineering and Architecture
- Faculty of Jurisprudence and Social Sciences
- Faculty of Medicine
- Faculty of Odontology
- Faculty of Chemistry and Pharmacy
- Foreign Department

=== Other ===
- West Multidisciplinary Faculty (Santa Ana)
- East Multidisciplinary Faculty (San Miguel)
- Paracentral Multidisciplinary Faculty (San Vicente)

== Notable alumni ==
- Eugenio Aguilar
- Fidel Antonio Novoa Meléndez President of the Legislative Assembly (1903 and 1912)
- Fidel Antonio Novoa Fuentes Congressman of the Legislative Assembly (1929)
- Ricardo Armando Novoa Arciniegas Judge of the Supreme Court of Justice (1989)
- Juan José Cañas
- Fabio Castillo Figueroa
- Antonia Navarro Huezo, the first woman in Central America to graduate from university
- Rafael Menjívar Larín
- Sandra Yanira Martinez Tobar, meteorologist, politician
- María Isabel Rodríguez, Minister of Health (2009–2014), Rector of University of El Salvador (1999–2007)
- Iván Barton, football referee who officiated at the 2022 FIFA World Cup in Qatar, and the 2026 FIFA World Cup in the United States, Canada, and Mexico.
- Johanna Segovia, marine ecologist
- María Julia Castillo Rodas, first female president of the Legislative Assembly of El Salvador
