= Ciudad Mujer =

Women public organization in El Salvador

- Formation: March 28, 2011; 15 years ago
- Founder: Vanda Pignato; Mauricio Funes
- Type: Social Program
- Purpose: Women social service
- Headquarters: El Salvador
- Local Development Minister: María Chichilco
- Website: ciudadmujer.gob.sv

Ciudad Mujer (transl. "Women City") is a project of the government of El Salvador, created on March 28, 2011, as an initiative of the then First Lady Vanda Pignato. It consists of offering aid to victims of violence against women, as well to provide access to women's healthcare services, financial advice, and career training. The six Ciudad Mujer centers, located throughout the country offer services from 15 Salvadoran government agencies in one location. These include job training and financial loans to offer a chance for economic independence. Ciudad Mujer also provides healthcare services, including forensic laboratories and legal aid for victims of sexual assault, reproductive services, neonatal care, and breast cancer prevention. 603,000 women have utilized Ciudad Mujer, as of November 2014.

The project was placed under the responsibility of the Secretariat for Social Inclusion with the First Lady as the head.

However, after President Nayib Bukele's takeover in June 2019, Ciudad Mujer became part of the new Ministry of Local Development, since the secretariat under whose charge it had been placed was abolished.

== History ==
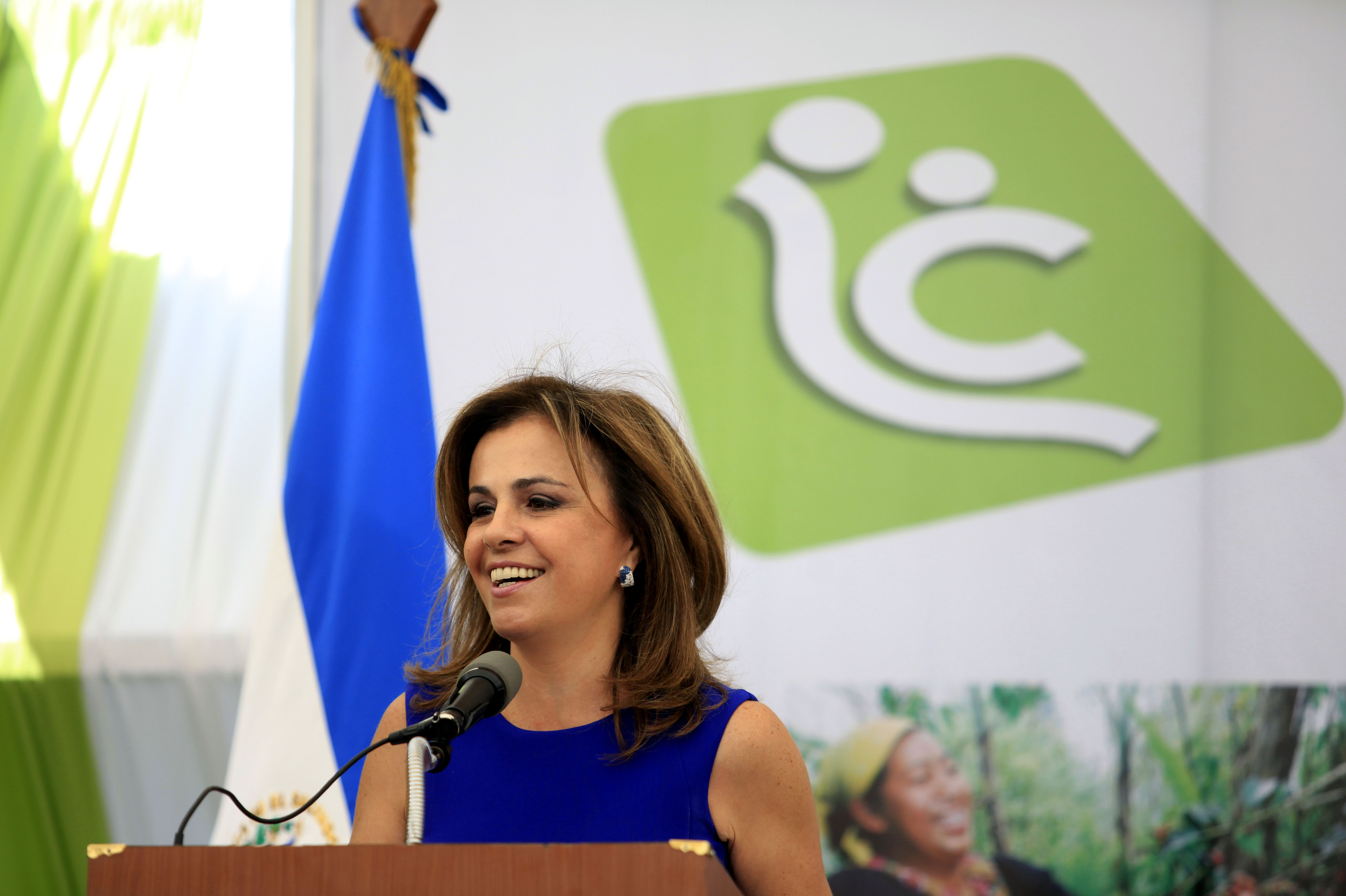
Vanda Pignato, during her speech at the graduation of women from the Colón and San Martín headquarters in 2015.

The Ciudad Mujer idea was first announced during Mauricio Funes political campaign in 2009.

Ciudad Mujer is based on the idea of unifying all State institutions that provide services to women in the same space. The integration of these services under a single roof reduces the transaction costs of women users and allows their quality to be substantially increased.

The model aims to promote autonomy in its three dimensions: physical, economic and citizen participation of women through labor participation, facilitate comprehensive health care for women, with an emphasis on sexual and reproductive health, strengthen actions to prevent violence against women and provide childcare to children while their mothers use the services.

Six centers have been opened to low-income areas across El Salvador. Vanda Pignato overcame opposition against the plan from several sectors of Salvadoran society, which included politicians, evangelical Christian groups, and the Roman Catholic Church, to launch Ciudad Mujer. Ciudad Mujer, which had provided healthcare, legal, and healthcare services to 603,000 women by November 2014, has won praise both within El Salvador and internationally.

After Colón center, who simply adapted an existing complex, the construction of the six new centers was financed with a loan of US$20 million agreed with the Inter-American Development Bank (IDB).

It currently groups 18 state institutions in the same space. Ciudad Mujer has served 1,761,050 users in its different locations, in its 7 years of operation.

== Headquarters ==
- Colón center, which is the first headquarters of the program, opened on March 28, 2011.
- Usulután center was inaugurated on October 2, 2012.
- Santa Ana center was inaugurated on January 13, 2013. The Ciudad Mujer project has greatly influenced other countries, 10 becoming a benchmark for replicating this project in their territories, leading to its implementation in the Dominican Republic, 11 Mexico, 12 Paraguay13 and Honduras14.
- San Martín center was inaugurated on March 10, 2013.
- San Miguel center was inaugurated on December 15, 2013.
- El Divisadero center was inaugurated under the presidency of Professor Salvador Sánchez Cerén on December 11, 2014.

== Legacy ==
Ciudad Mujer provoked greatly influenced other countries, becoming a benchmark for replicating this project in their territories, leading to its implementation in the Dominican Republic, Mexico, Paraguay, and Honduras.

Also, Brazil has announced plans to open its own Ciudad Mujer initiative, while Guatemala, Colombia, and Mexico have expressed interest in adopting Pignato's initiative as well.
