= First Lady of El Salvador =

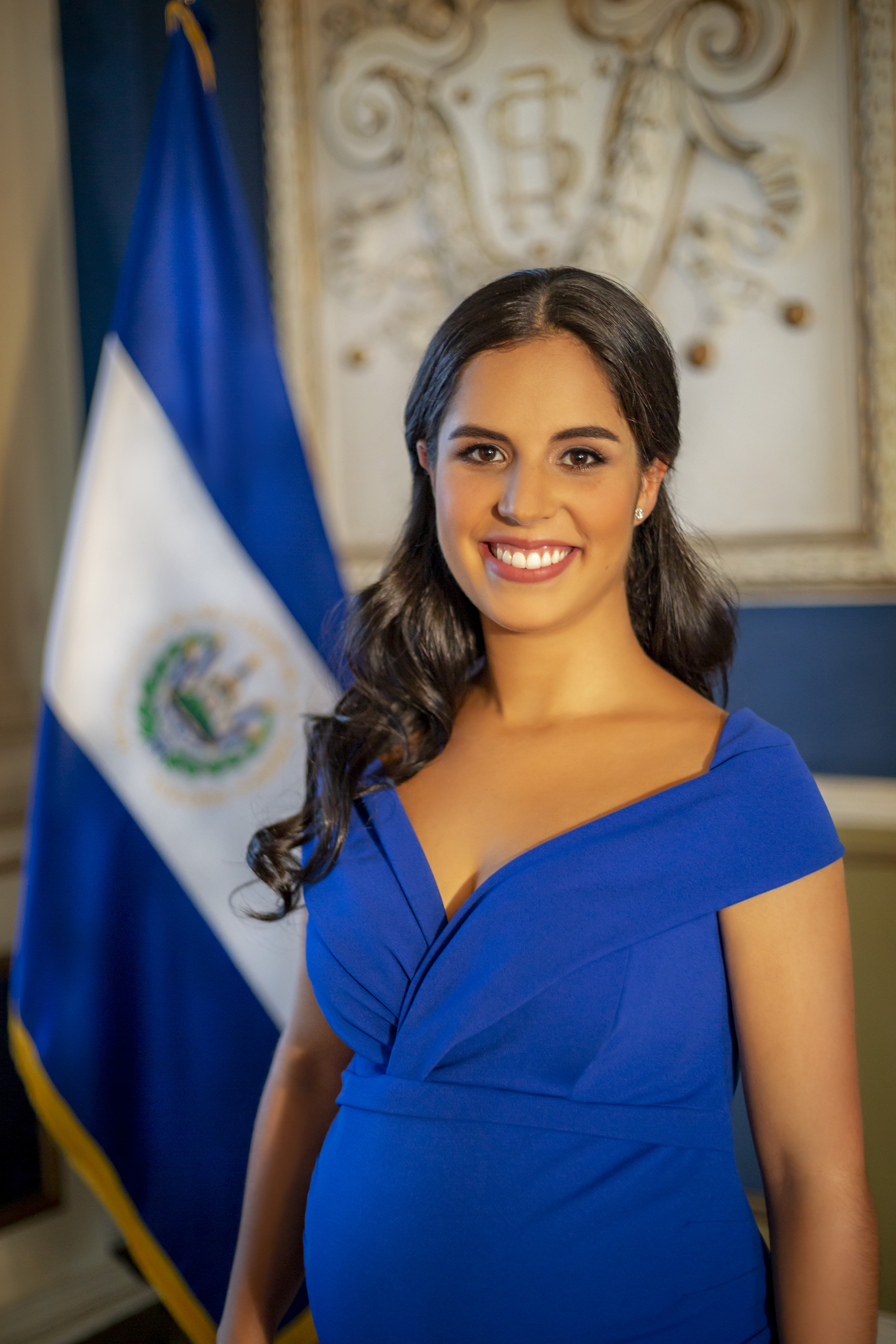
- Incumbent; Gabriela Rodríguez de Bukele since 1 June 2019
- Residence: Casa Presidencial, San Salvador
- Inaugural holder: Rita Guzmán Cisneros
- Formation: 22 February 1841
- Website: Office of the First Lady

First Lady of the Republic of El Salvador (Spanish: Primera dama de El Salvador) is the title attributed to the wife (or designee) of the President of El Salvador. The office of First Lady coordinates protocol and social affairs within the presidency and promotes domestic social programs. To date, there has been no "First Gentleman" of El Salvador.

The country's current first lady is Gabriela Rodríguez de Bukele, wife of President Nayib Bukele, who has held the position since 1 June 2019.

== Partial list of first ladies (since 1934) ==
Partial list of first ladies since Concepción Monteagudo, wife of President Maximiliano Hernández Martínez, in 1931.

First Lady	President of El Salvador	Tenure begins	Tenure ends
Concepción Monteagudo	Maximiliano Hernández Martínez	4 December 1931	28 August 1934
Catalina Carvallo de Menéndez	Andrés Ignacio Menéndez	29 August 1934	1 March 1935
Concepción Monteagudo	Maximiliano Hernández Martínez	1 March 1935	9 May 1944
Catalina Carvallo de Menéndez	Andrés Ignacio Menéndez	9 May 1944	20 October 1944
Rosa Cardona de Aguirre	Osmín Aguirre y Salinas	21 October 1944	1 March 1945
Josefina Bulnes de Castaneda Castro	Salvador Castaneda Castro	1 March 1945	14 December 1948
Position vacant	Revolutionary Council of Government (es)	14 December 1948	14 September 1950
Esperanza Llerena	Óscar Osorio	14 September 1950	14 September 1956
Coralia Párraga de Lemus	José María Lemus	14 September 1956	16 October 1960
Position vacant	Junta of Government of El Salvador	26 October 1960	25 January 1961
Position vacant	Civic-Military Directory	25 January 1961	25 January 1962
Blanca Luna de Cordón	Eusebio Rodolfo Cordón Cea	25 January 1962	1 July 1962
Berta de Rivera	Julio Adalberto Rivera	1 July 1962	1 July 1967
Marina Uriarte de Sánchez Hernández	Fidel Sánchez Hernández	1 July 1967	1 July 1972
María Elena Contreras de Molina	Arturo Armando Molina	1 July 1972	1 July 1977
Gloria Guerrero de Romero	Carlos Humberto Romero	1 July 1977	15 October 1979
Position vacant	Revolutionary Government Junta of El Salvador	15 October 1979	2 May 1982
Lisabele Magaña	Álvaro Magaña (interim)	2 May 1982	1 June 1984
Inés Durán de Duarte	José Napoleón Duarte	1 June 1984	1 June 1989
Margarita Llach de Cristiani	Alfredo Cristiani	1 June 1989	1 June 1994
Elizabeth Aguirre de Calderón	Armando Calderón Sol	1 June 1994	1 June 1999
Lourdes Rodríguez de Flores	Francisco Flores	1 June 1999	1 June 2004
Ana Ligia Mixco Sol de Saca	Elías Antonio Saca	1 June 2004	1 June 2009
Vanda Pignato	Mauricio Funes	1 June 2009	1 June 2014
Margarita Villalta de Sánchez	Salvador Sánchez Cerén	1 June 2014	1 June 2019
Gabriela Rodríguez de Bukele	Nayib Bukele	1 June 2019	Incumbent
