= Hato Hasbún =

Salvadoran politician (1946–2017)

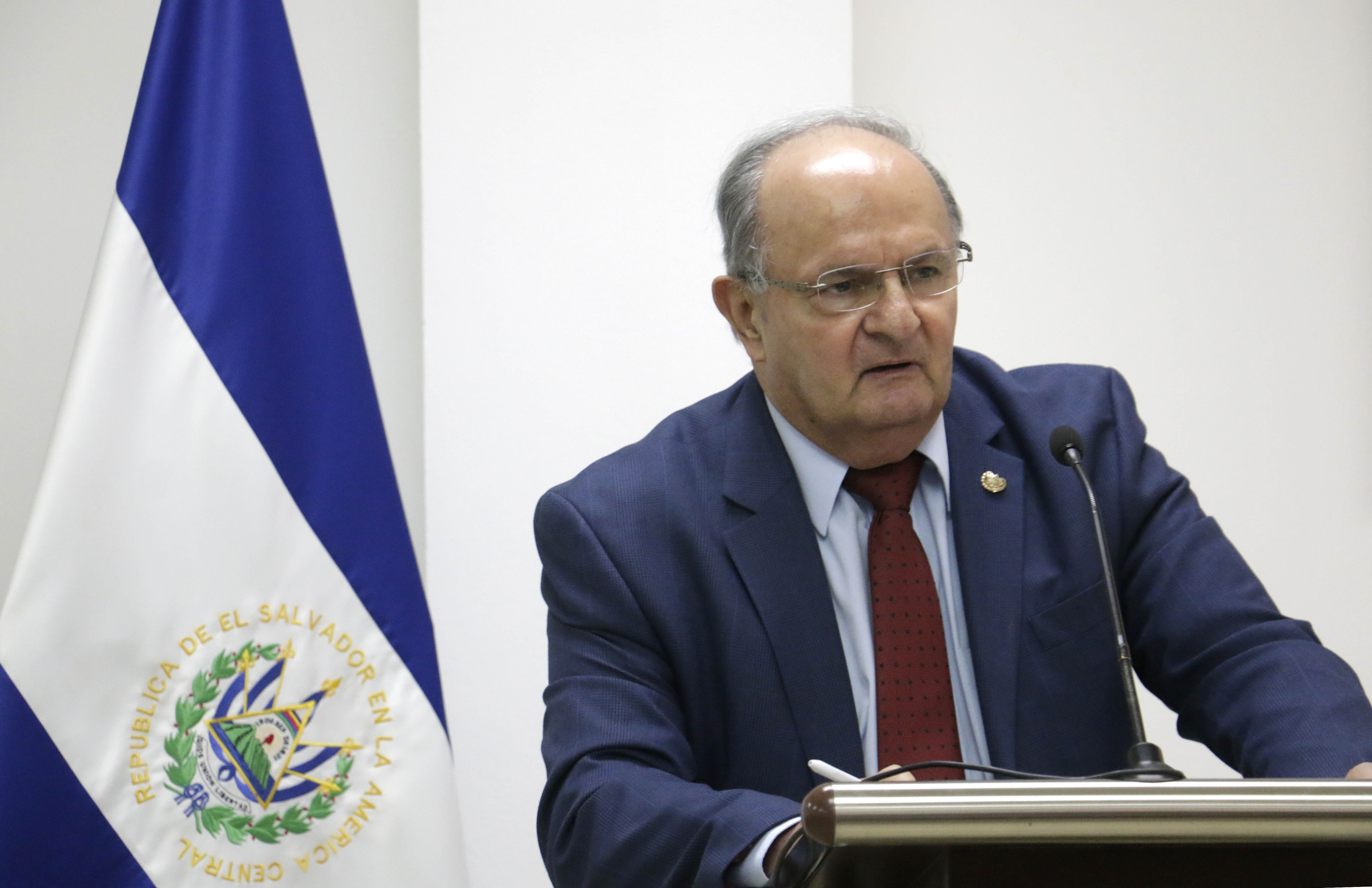
Hato Hasbún

Franzi Hato Hasbún Barake (1946 – 30 August 2017) was a Salvadoran politician of Palestinian origin.

He was born in 1946 in San Salvador. He was a sociologist specializing in electoral politics, multilateralism, and public opinion. Hasbún held master's degrees in sociology, philosophy, and journalism. He became a teacher at Externado San José in 1972, where he was a mentor to future president Mauricio Funes. From 1992 to 1996 he served as an advisor to the rectory, project manager, and professor of sociology at the Central American University, San Salvador.

In 2009, Funes became president and Hasbúnbecame the Secretary of Strategic Affairs of the President of El Salvador. Starting in 2012, he also held the post of Minister of Education after then-vice-president, Salvador Sánchez Cerén, resigned from the position.

He died in August 2017 at the age of 71 in San Salvador.
