= Ana Vilma de Escobar =

Salvadoran politician (born 1954)

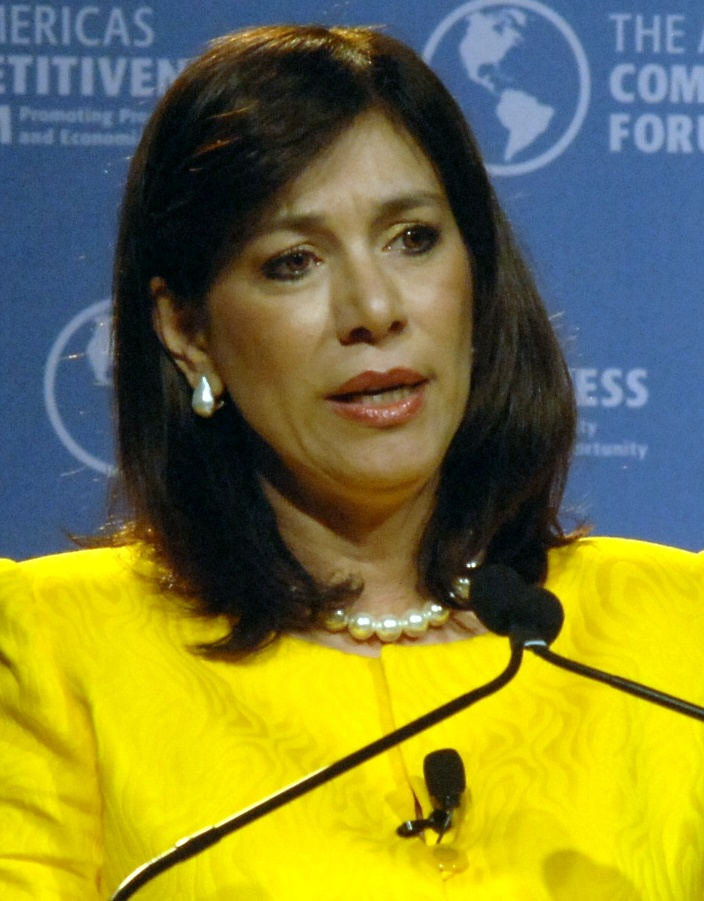
- De Escobar in 2021

Vice President of El Salvador
- In office 1 June 2004 – 1 June 2009
- President: Antonio Saca
- Preceded by: Carlos Quintanilla Schmidt
- Succeeded by: Salvador Sánchez Cerén

Personal details
- Born: 2 March 1954 (age 72) San Salvador, El Salvador
- Party: Nationalist Republican Alliance
- Spouse: Carlos Patricio Escobar Thompson

Ana Vilma Albanez de Escobar (born 2 March 1954) is a Salvadoran politician who was Vice President of El Salvador from 1 June 2004 to 1 June 2009. She is a member of the right-wing Nationalist Republican Alliance (ARENA).

She is the first woman to serve as vice president, complementing the presidential formula of Elías Antonio Saca for the term 2004–2009. Their victory was the outcome of the most attended election in Salvadoran history, giving their party, ARENA, 58.5% of the votes, 20 points above its closest contender. She sought the nomination for president of El Salvador in the presidential primary of 2008 but was defeated by National Police Chief Rodrigo Ávila.

== Education and experience ==
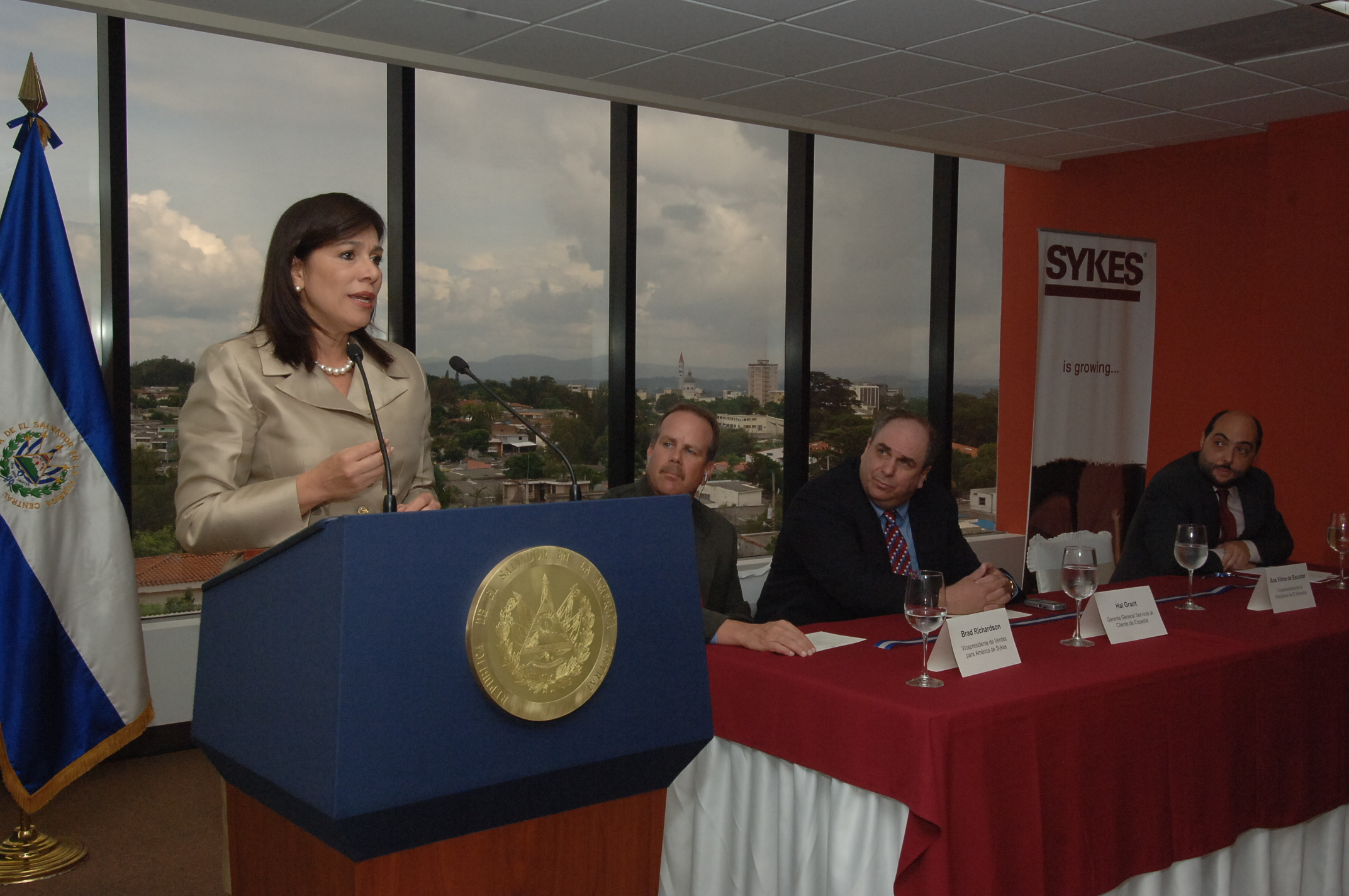

She earned a degree in economics from the "José Simeón Cañas" Central American University additionally she has pedagogical experience in the areas of mathematics and languages. She is fluent in both English and French.

De Escobar worked for ten years at the United States Agency for International Development in its Private Sector Office managing projects to develop the promotion of non-traditional exports and to foment foreign investment through the private and public sector.

Her participation in Salvadoran politics includes serving as executive director of the political party ARENA and Director of the Women's Sector of the Party. She was a candidate for the Legislative Assembly in the 2003 elections.

== Governance ==
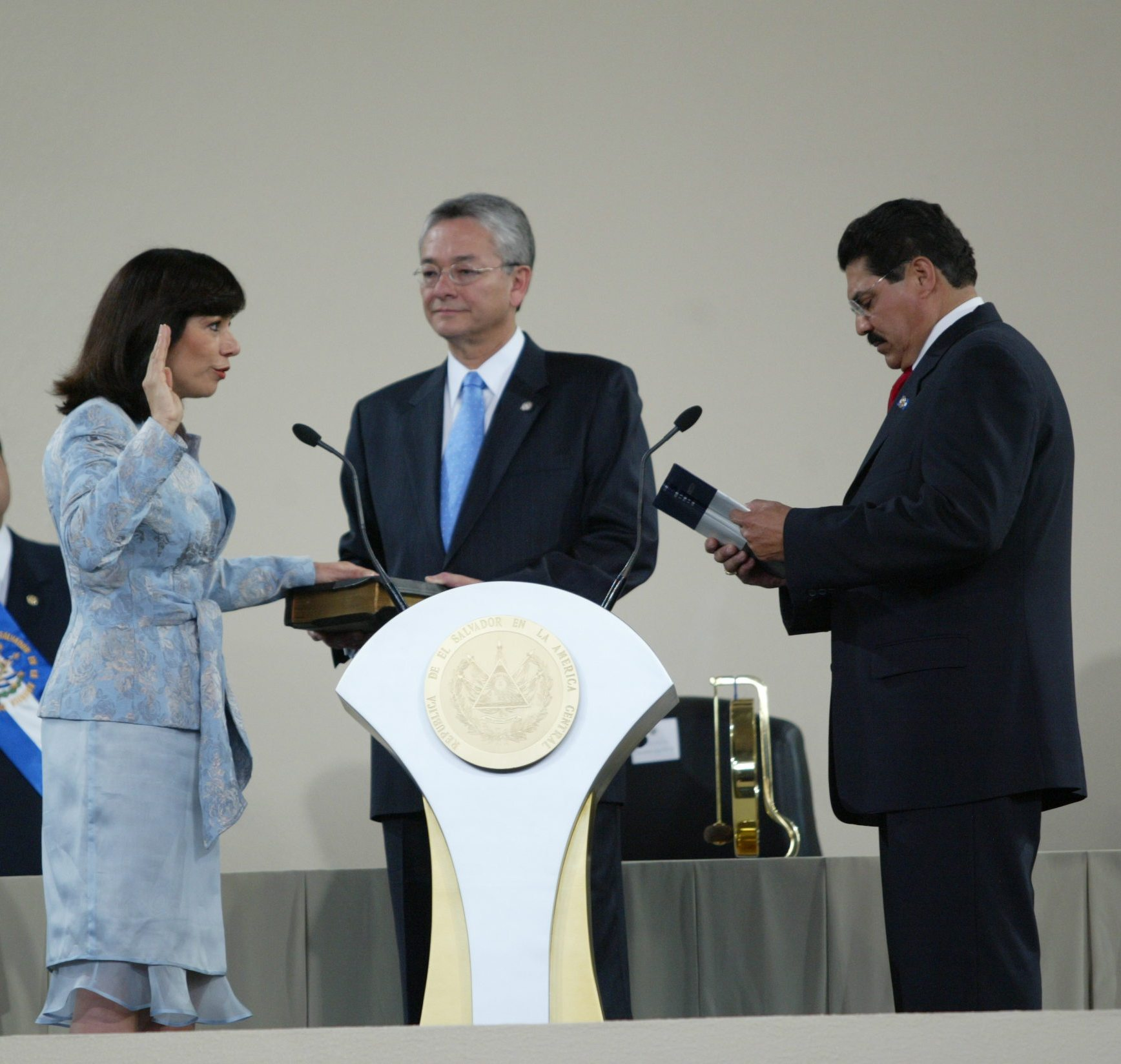
In the initiation ceremony, on 1 June 2004.

Within the government, she had the task of leading the efforts to create jobs through the Foreign Direct Investment Promotion Agency (PROESA, by its Spanish acronym) and Export Promotion Agency (EXPORTA). She was elected President of the National Agency for the Promotion of Exports.

In her management, she developed the conception and launch of the National Export Strategy in force until 2016, the strategic investment attraction for the integration of the textile industry and clothing, and attracting investment in the services sector, especially in Contact and Distribution and Logisticscenters.

She also developed a plan to convert El Salvador into a regional hub, with the goal of modernizing the country.

De Escobar was also president of the National Commission for Sustainable Development (CNDS). The CNDS works with the United Nations Development Programme, international organizations, and government institutions responsible of carrying out national social programs.

== Legislative candidacy ==
On 20 May 2011 was published his nominations a candidate for legislator to the Legislative Assembly of El Salvador by the department of San Salvador, under the Nationalist Republican Alliance (ARENA).

One difference from previous years in the elections, are the reforms in electoral laws, the ballot for the election of deputies, will show the faces of the candidates. Ana Vilma began in December 2011 a campaign called Defend your vote and the main campaign promise is your work plan is the commitment to the country's growth in all sectors.

On Sunday 11 March 2012, the country was under elections, after scrutiny by the Supreme Electoral Tribunal of El Salvador was announced that Ana Vilma de Escobar received 135.015 votes, these results became the candidate for Congress of party ARENA in San Salvador with more preference votes received by face. De Escobar will hold deputy in charge of San Salvador in the period 2012–2015 in the Salvadoran parliament.

Political offices
Preceded by Carlos Quintanilla Schmidt	Vice President of El Salvador; 2004–2009	Succeeded by Salvador Sánchez Cerén
