= Eliud Ulises Ayala Zamora =

Salvadoran politician

Minister of Public Works
- In office 1 December 2017 – 31 May 2019
- President: Salvador Sánchez Cerén

Personal details
- Occupation: Politician

Eliud Ulises Ayala Zamora is a Salvadoran politician. He served as El Salvador's minister of public works. He served as vice minister of public works from 1 January 2017 to 30 November 2017 and then as minister of public works from 1 December 2017 until the end of the executive branch term on 31 May 2019.
