= Vanda Pignato =

Salvadoran lawyer

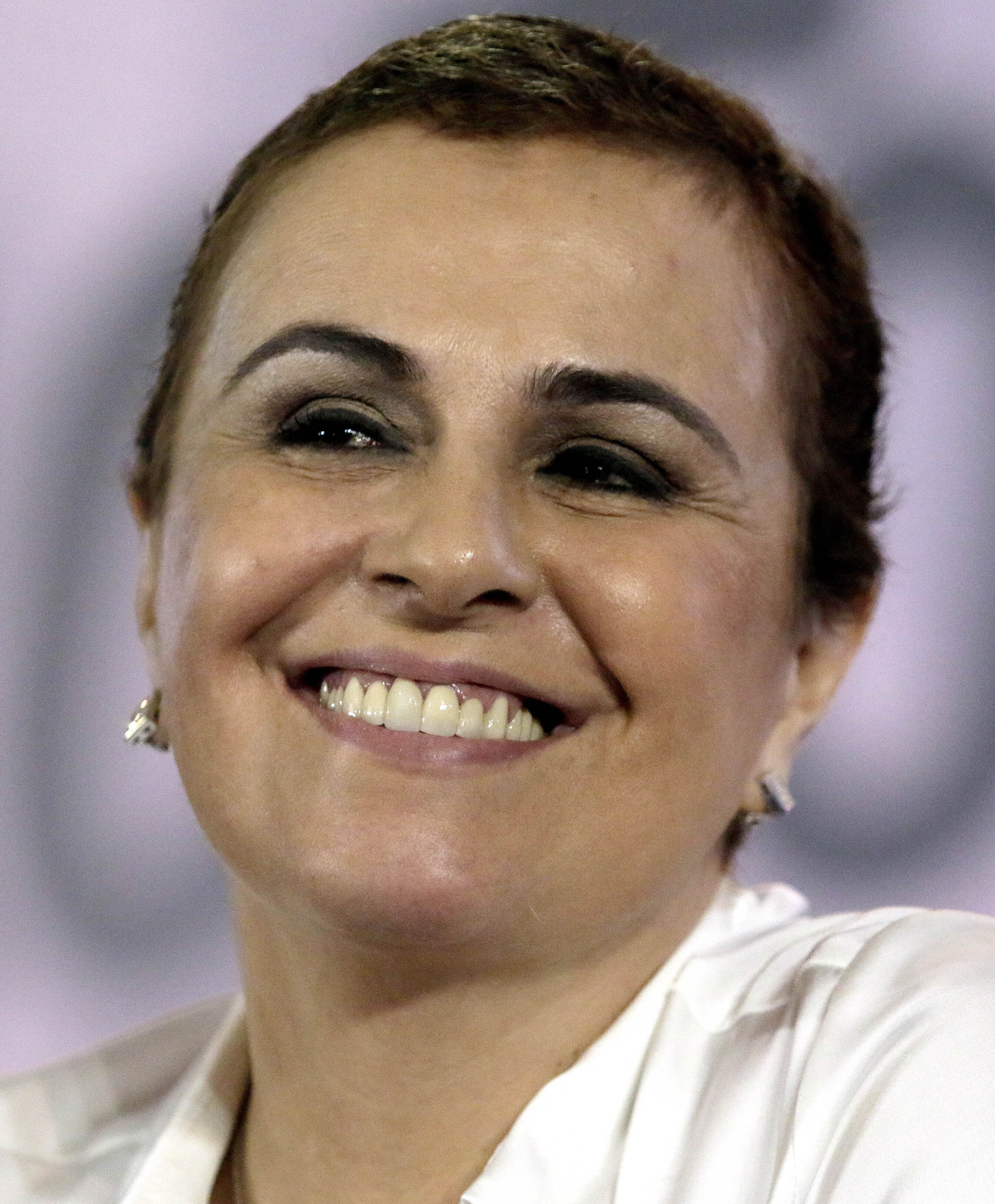
- Pignato in 2016

El Salvador Secretary of Social Inclusion
- In office 1 June 2009 – 1 June 2019
- President: Mauricio Funes; Salvador Sánchez Cerén

First Lady of El Salvador
- In role 1 June 2009 – 1 June 2014
- President: Mauricio Funes
- Preceded by: Ana Ligia Mixco Sol de Saca
- Succeeded by: Margarita Villalta de Sánchez

Personal details
- Born: Vanda Guiomar Pignato; 15 February 1961 (age 64); São Paulo, Brazil
- Political party: FMLN
- Spouse: Mauricio Funes (m. 1993; sep. 2014)
- Children: 1
- Occupation: Lawyer

Vanda Guiomar Pignato (born 15 February 1961) is a Brazilian-born Salvadoran lawyer, activist, politician and former First Lady of El Salvador from 2009 until 2014. Pignato became First Lady of El Salvador on 1 June 2009, the same day that her husband, President Mauricio Funes, appointed her as the country's Secretary of Social Inclusion from 2009 to 2014. The appointment made Pignato the first sitting First Lady in El Salvador's history to hold a political position. Funes's successor, President Salvador Sánchez Cerén, reappointed Pignato as Secretary of Social Inclusion when he took office in June 2014.

In 2011, Pignato established Ciudad Mujer (Women City), to aid victims of violence against women, as well provide access to women's healthcare services, financial advice, and career training. The five Ciudad Mujer centers, located throughout the country, offer services from 15 Salvadoran government agencies in one location. These include job training and financial loans to offer a chance for economic independence. Ciudad Mujer also provides healthcare services, including forensic laboratories and legal aid for victims of sexual assault, reproductive services, neonatal care and breast cancer prevention. An estimated 603,000 women have utilized Ciudad Mujer, as of November 2014.

Pignato's Ciudad Mujer initiative has received international support and recognition, including from the Inter-American Development Bank and the United Nations. In January 2015, the Brazilian government announced plans to launch its own "Women's House" project, modeled on Pignato's Ciudad Mujer program in El Salvador. The first "Women's House" in Pignato's native Brazil is slated for Campo Grande, Mato Grosso do Sul. Guatemala, Colombia and Mexico have also expressed interest in implementing Pignato's programs.

== Biography ==
Pignato was born in São Paulo, Brazil. She became an activist in the Workers' Party (PT) and served as an adviser to Luiz Inácio Lula da Silva, who would later serve as President of Brazil from 2003 to 2011. She reportedly remains close to both Lula da Silva and his successor, President Dilma Rousseff.

She began documenting human rights abuses in El Salvador during the Salvadoran Civil War, which was ended by the Chapultepec Peace Accords. Pignato moved from Brazil to El Salvador in 1992, where she represented the Workers' Party in Central America. She also became the Director of the Center for Brazilian Studies at the Embassy of Brazil in San Salvador in 1992. She later married Mauricio Funes, a Salvadoran journalist and FMLN politician, with whom she had one son, Gabriel.

== First Lady and Secretary of Social Inclusion ==
Pignato has promoted women's rights and gender equality during her tenures as First Lady and Secretary of Social Inclusion. Pignato's Department of Social Inclusion oversees issues related to human rights and family affairs in El Salvador. Pignato was first appointed as Secretary on 1 June 2009, by her husband, President Mauricio Funes. She was reappointed to the post in 2014 by President Salvador Sánchez Cerén, who asked her to stay on as his Secretary of Social Inclusion.

Pignato has acknowledged the challenges facing Salvadoran women, who have higher high school dropout rates and lower literacy rates than men. They tend to be economically dependent on male partners or family members, making it more difficult to leave an abusive relationship. In 2012, President Mauricio Funes gave a speech calling "Violence against women is violence against society," which was one of the first times that women's issues and gender-based violence had reached the forefront of political debate in El Salvador. In a 2014 interview with the Thomson Reuters Foundation, Vignato praised her now-estranged husband's efforts and his 2012 speech, noting "Before that speech women didn't exist in government policies. They were invisible. At Women City, women are now visible, in a place that's just for them. When women come here they get a hug from a female official who doesn't judge or ignore them."

Her signature initiative has been Ciudad Mujer, which were established in 2011. Five the centers have been opened to low income areas across El Salvador. She overcame opposition against the plan from several sectors of Salvadoran society, which included politicians, evangelical Christian groups, and the Roman Catholic Church, to launch Ciudad Mujer. Ciudad Mujer, which had provided healthcare, legal and healthcare services to 603,000 women by November 2014, have won praise both within El Salvador and internationally. Brazil has announced plans to open its own Ciudad Mujer initiative, while Guatemala, Colombia and Mexico have expressed interest in adopting Pignato's initiative as well.

Pignato simultaneously served as the Salvadorian Institute for Women Development. Additionally, she was appointed as the first President Salvadorian National Council for the Youth.

In October 2011, ten days of heavy rain led to severe flooding which affected 70% of El Salvador and damaged approximately 80% of the country's roads. The floods, which impacted 300,000 residents, killed 105 people and destroyed of 250,000 of agricultural land and crops. Then President Mauricio Funes estimated that damages totaled $840 million, equal to 4% of El Salvador's gross domestic product (GDP). Pignato, as both Secretary of Social Inclusion and First Lady, traveled to Washington D.C. in November 2011 to lobby for humanitarian aid from the United States Congress and the U.S. State Department. She also met with United Nations Secretary General Ban Ki-moon, former U.S. President Bill Clinton, the Salvadoran American community and representatives for the corporate sector.

The National Ethnic Coalition of Organizations (NECO) awarded Pignato the Ellis Island Medal of Honor in May 2012, citing her cooperation with the Salvadoran American community and her initiatives to support women's rights.

In October 2014, Funes publicly confirmed that he and Pignato had separated.

In July 2015, Secretary Vanda Pignato announced that she had been diagnosed with cancer. She took a temporary leave of absence from the Department of Social Inclusion to undergo treatment for the disease.

On 12 May 2017, Joao Santana, a Brazilian marketing consultant reveleaded under oath the money applied to Funes first presidential campaign was financed by Brazilian company Odebrecht with dirt money, the command to Odebrecht to give money to Funes campaign committee came from former Brazilian President, Luiz Inácio Lula da Silva.

A Warrant has been issued for Vanda Pignato arrest. This was decided on the afternoon of Monday, 12 June 2018 by the Fifth Peace Court of San Salvador.

Pignato is part of the case against Funes for the crimes of embezzlement, and money and asset laundering.

Jorge Cortez, head of the Financial Unit of the Attorney General of the Republic (FGR), explained that they had requested that Pignato only pay a bond to be processed in freedom as a consideration for her health condition. However, the judge decided to issue a warrant for her arrest since he believes Pignato poses a flight risk.

Honorary titles
Preceded by Ana Ligia Mixco Sol de Saca	First Lady of El Salvador; 2009–2014	Succeeded by Margarita Villalta de Sánchez
