= Carlos Quintanilla Schmidt =

Former vice president of El Salvador under Francisco Flores from 1999 to 2004

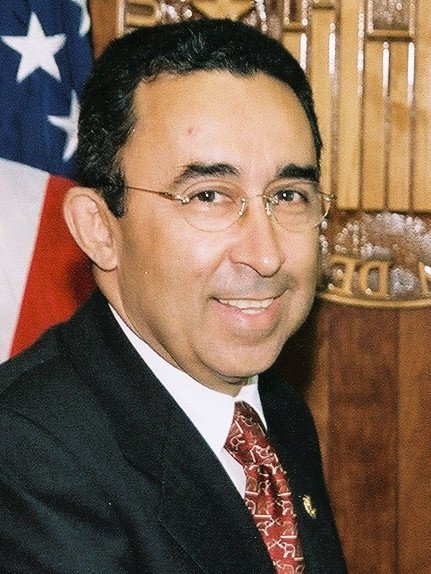

Vice President of El Salvador
- In office 1 June 1999 – 1 June 2004
- President: Francisco Flores Pérez
- Preceded by: Enrique Borgo Bustamante
- Succeeded by: Ana Vilma de Escobar

Personal details
- Born: 5 August 1953 (age 72) San Miguel, El Salvador
- Party: Nationalist Republican Alliance
- Education: American University; José Matías Delgado University

Carlos Quintanilla Schmidt (born 5 August 1953 in San Miguel) is a former vice president of El Salvador under Francisco Flores from 1999 to 2004. Quintanilla and Flores were known as the "dollarizers" (dolarizadores), having introduced the use of the U.S. dollar as the official currency of the country. Quintanilla's successor was Ana Vilma de Escobar.

He has a degree in banking from American University, and a degree in law from José Matías Delgado University. Additionally, he served as vice-rector of José Matías Delgado University.

In November 2017 an investigation conducted by the International Consortium of Investigative Journalism cited his name in the list of politicians named in "Paradise Papers" allegations.
