= María Ofelia Navarrete =

Salvadoran politician

Minister of Local Development of El Salvador
- Incumbent
- Assumed office 1 June 2019
- President: Nayib Bukele
- Preceded by: Position established

Deputy of the Legislative Assembly of El Salvador
- In office 1 May 1994 – 1 May 1997

Personal details
- Born: 31 March 1950 (age 76) Arcatao, El Salvador
- Party: Nuevas Ideas
- Other political affiliations: FMLN (formerly)
- Occupation: Politician, guerrilla fighter
- Nickname: María Chichilco

María Ofelia Navarrete de Dubón (also known as María Chichilco) is a Salvadoran politician and ex-combatant. She was appointed to the position of Minister of Local Development by President Nayib Bukele in May 2019.

== Early life ==
Navarrete began her career early on in her life. At the age of 12, she worked in the house of the Health Minister of El Salvador. While there, she befriended the child of the person she worked for. He spoke in favor of the revolutionary ideas associated with the FMLN movement of the time, inspiring her and her future political endeavors. In 1979, Navarette had to flee her home with her husband and children due to the escalation of the civil war. There she lived for 12 years, as she joined the guerilla movement alongside her husband. During her time as a guerilla combatant, she served a logistics coordinator for the movement. She also helped administer the clandestine hospitals which gave medical attention to combatants who suffered injuries during the armed conflict.

Her life during the conflict was the subject of the 1990 documentary film Maria's Story.

== Role in FMLN ==
Navarette joined the FMLN in 1980. At the age of 24, she helped organize the Field Work Unit (UTC) which was a union made for field workers. After the signing of the Chapultepec Peace Accords in 1992, Navarette became a deputy in the Legislative Assembly for the leftist party from 1994 to 1997. Later in her career, she assumed the role of Vice Minister under the presidency of Mauricio Funes, from 2009 to 2014. Navarette served as the coordinator for the FMLN party in Chalatenango, where she also served as the vice governor. Her role as coordinator was the last position she assumed for the FMLN. Navarette was discharged from her position due to the critiques she expressed while working for the party. Her main critique was that the FMLN lost sight of their original initiative when the party was founded, which was grounded in giving back to the people.

== Construction of Bridge María Chichilco ==
Navarette served an important role in the construction of a bridge over the Torola River, in the department of Morazán, El Salvador. The bridge Maria Chichilco, named after Navarette's pseudonym, was inaugurated on 30 December 2019. This project was significant for the inhabitants of the municipals San Isidro and Torola, as the nearby residents had been asking for this public works project to be built for years. Under her role as the Minister of Local Development, the area of the Torola river was the first which Navarette visited. The project cost more than $1 million which went into the construction of the bridge structure, which has a walkway and a one lane road, as well as a paved road from the nearby highway to the sight of the bridge. On 25 August 2020, the bridge was reported to be damaged. Strong rains and significant water elevation damaged one of the entrances of the bridge. Critics may point that the original structure was not technically adequate enough.
