= 2009 Salvadoran presidential election =

2009 elections in El Salvador

- 15 March 2009
- Registered: 4,226,479
- Turnout: 62.92% (▼4.42pp)
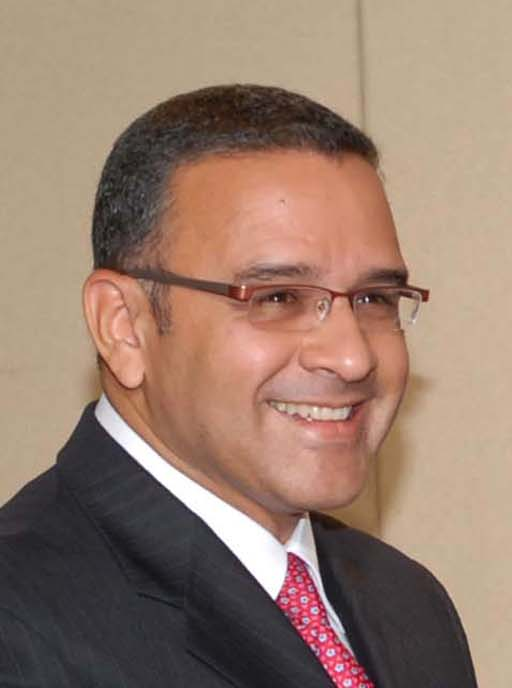

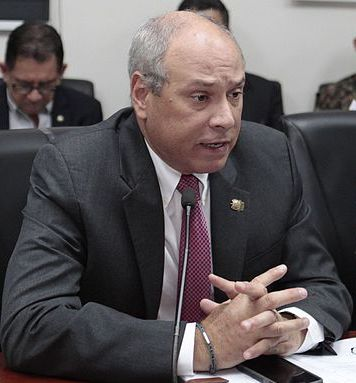
Nominee	Mauricio Funes	Rodrigo Ávila
Party	FMLN	ARENA
Running mate	Salvador Sánchez Cerén	Arturo Zablah
Popular vote	1,354,000	1,284,588
Percentage	51.32%	48.68%
- Results by department
President before election
Antonio Saca
ARENA
Elected President
Mauricio Funes
FMLN

Presidential elections were held in El Salvador on 15 March 2009. The main candidates were Rodrigo Ávila (ARENA) and Mauricio Funes (FMLN). Funes won the election with 51.3% of the vote and became the first leftist president of El Salvador.

== Candidates ==
The Farabundo Martí National Liberation Front nominated Mauricio Funes as its presidential candidate and Salvador Sánchez Cerén as his running mate. The Nationalist Republican Alliance nominated Rodrigo Ávila and Arturo Zablah.

The Christian Democratic Party (PDC) had nominated Carlos Rivas Zamora and Merlin Peña, but withdrew the nominations on 2 February 2009 after it became apparent that they would have little chance of winning the election. The PDC did not immediately voice support for one of the other candidates.

The National Coalition Party, which had nominated Luis Tomás Chévez, also withdrew its candidate a few days later.

== Opinion polls ==
A poll from mid September 2008 gave Funes 29.2% and Ávila 26.1%, while Tomás Chévez (PCN) got 1.9%. However, a poll from late September gave Funes 47.4% to 23.8% for Ávila. This latter poll showing Funes with a large lead is more consistent with polling from previous months.

Later polls from 2008 showed a tightening race between Funes and Ávila, with Funes retaining the lead.

== Electoral system ==
=== Political parties ===
The following political parties were eligible to run candidates in the 2009 presidential election.

Party		Leader	Participated?
PDC	Christian Democratic Party; Partido Demócrata Cristiano	Rodolfo Parker	No (Note: Withdrawn candidate)
CD	Democratic Change; Cambio Democrático	Héctor Dada Hirezi	No
FMLN	Farabundo Martí National Liberation Front; Frente Farabundo Martí para la Liberación Nacional	Medardo González	Yes
PCN	National Conciliation Party; Partido de Conciliación Nacional	Ciro Cruz Zepeda	No
ARENA	Nationalist Republican Alliance; Alianza Republicana Nacionalista	Rodrigo Ávila	Yes
FDR	Revolutionary Democratic Front; Frente Democrático Revolucionario		No

== Results ==
Funes won the election with 51.3% of the vote, while Avila received 48.7%, marking the first time ARENA had lost a presidential election in 20 years. Of the election, Funes said, "This is the happiest night of my life, and I want it to be the night of El Salvador's greatest hope. I want to thank all the people who voted for me and chose that path of hope and change." Ávila conceded defeat, saying that he and his party "will be a constructive opposition." An observation team from the Organization of American States said that the elections were held without any major incidents, although there were claims of Hondurans voting at a voting center in Torola, Morazán.

Several governments said that they looked forward to working with the new government, including Taiwan and the United States.

Candidate	Running mate	Party	Votes	%
Mauricio Funes	Salvador Sánchez Cerén	Farabundo Martí National Liberation Front	1,354,000	51.32
Rodrigo Ávila	Arturo Zablah	Nationalist Republican Alliance	1,284,588	48.68
Total			2,638,588	100.00
Valid votes			2,638,588	99.23
Invalid/blank votes			20,550	0.77
Total votes			2,659,138	100.00
Registered voters/turnout			4,226,479	62.92
Source: TSE
