= Margarita Villalta de Sánchez =

Former First Lady of El Salvador

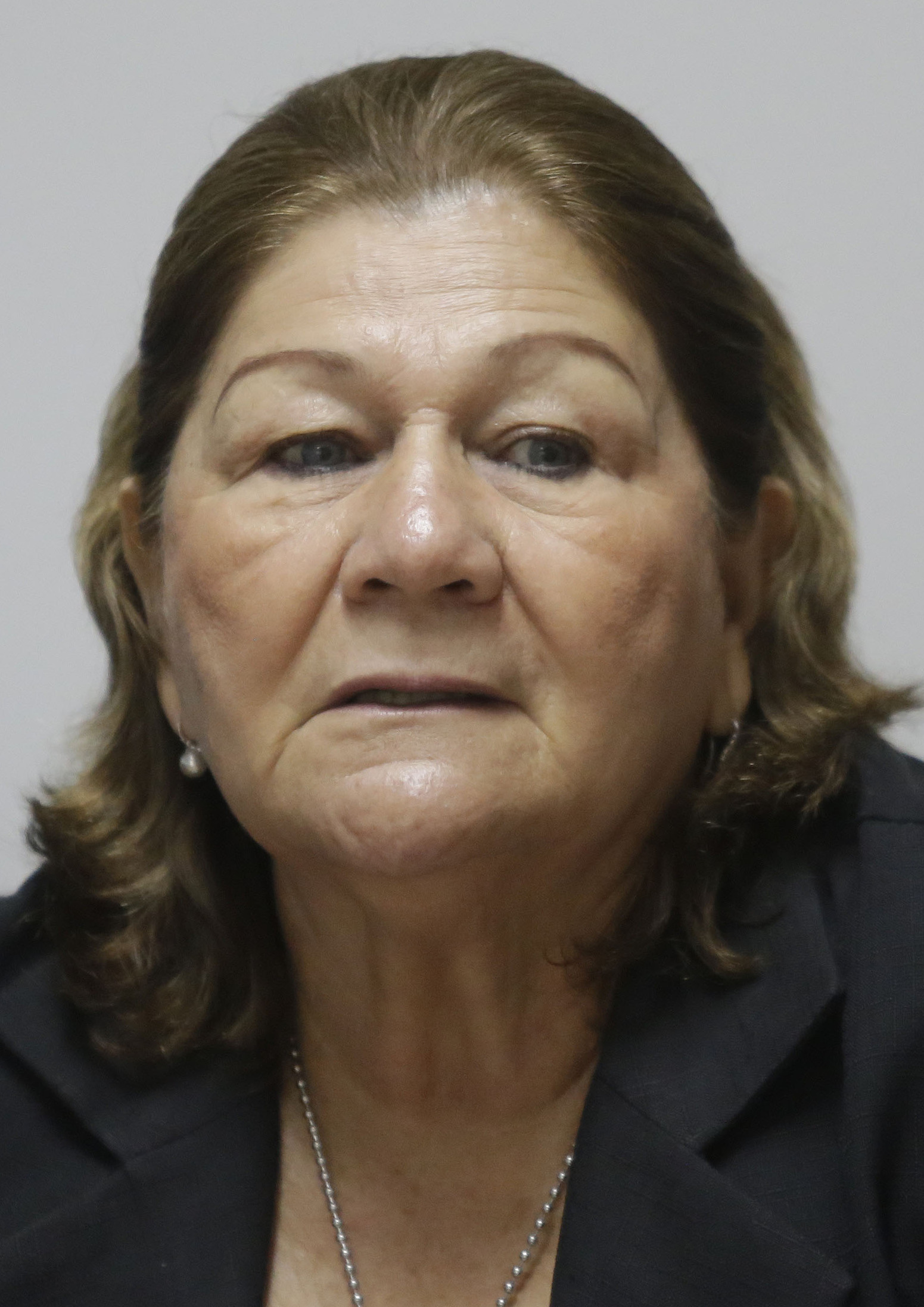
- Margarita Villalta de Sánchez in 2016

First Lady of El Salvador
- In role 1 June 2014 – 1 June 2019
- President: Salvador Sánchez Cerén
- Preceded by: Vanda Pignato
- Succeeded by: Gabriela Rodríguez de Bukele

Second Lady of El Salvador
- In role 1 June 2009 – 1 June 2014
- Vice President: Salvador Sánchez Cerén
- Preceded by: Carlos Patricio Escobar Thompson (as Second Gentleman)
- Succeeded by: Elda Tobar de Ortiz

Personal details
- Born: 4 April 1950 (age 76) Quezaltepeque, La Libertad Department, El Salvador
- Party: FMLN
- Spouse: Salvador Sánchez Cerén (m. 1968)
- Children: Four

Rosa Margarita Villalta de Sánchez (born 4 April 1950) is a Salvadoran activist, politician and public figure. The wife of President Salvador Sánchez Cerén, she served as the First Lady of El Salvador from 1 June 2014 to 1 June 2019.

== Biography ==
Villalta was born on 4 April 1950, in the city of Quezaltepeque, La Libertad Department, to Cristina Villalta and Marcos Morales. In 1968, she married Salvador Sánchez Cerén, with whom she had four children.

As the country's Second Lady, Villalta de Sánchez served as the coordinator of the Comisión de Acción Social (CAS), commission under the Vice President's office which developments programs for women and children in the country.

Margarita Villalta de Sánchez became the First Lady of El Salvador on 1 June 2014, upon the inauguration of her husband, a former leftist rebel commander during the Salvadoran Civil War. On 11 June 2014, Margarita Villalta de Sánchez was sworn in as the Director of the Instituto Salvadoreño para el Desarrollo Integral de la Niñez y la Adolescencia (ISNA), a government organization which works with children and adolescents. The head of 18 other government agencies and departments were also sworn in within the Salón de Honor Presidencial Óscar Arnulfo Romero at the Casa Presidencial.

The President and First Lady announced that they would reside in their home during their tenures, rather than the Casa Presidencial, the official residence of the president. In July 2014, the couple converted the Casa Presidencial into a museum and arts center, featuring the works of 45 Salvadoran artists.

Honorary titles
Preceded by Carlos Patricio Escobar Thompson (As Second Gentleman)	Second Lady of El Salvador; 2009–2014	Succeeded by Lilian Alvarenga de Ulloa (2019)
Preceded by Vanda Pignato	First Lady of El Salvador; 2014–2019	Succeeded by Gabriela Rodríguez de Bukele
