= Lourdes Rodríguez de Flores =

Salvadoran public figure and First Lady

- Lourdes Rodríguez de Flores in 2009

First Lady of El Salvador
- In role June 1, 1999 – June 1, 2004
- President: Francisco Flores Pérez
- Preceded by: Elizabeth Aguirre de Calderón
- Succeeded by: Ana Ligia Mixco Sol de Saca

Personal details
- Born: 3 February 1958 (age 68) San Salvador, El Salvador
- Spouse: Francisco Flores Pérez (1985–2016; his death)

Lourdes María Rodríguez de Flores (born 3 February 1958) is a Salvadoran public figure who served as the First Lady of El Salvador from 1999 until 2004. She is the widow of former President of El Salvador Francisco Flores, with whom she had two children.

Rodríguez publicly denounced charges of corruption against her husband, former President Flores, who died in a coma in 2016 while awaiting trial. She told local Salvadoran media at the time, "He suffered a terrible health crisis, provoked by this unjust political attack."

Honorary titles
Preceded by Elizabeth Aguirre de Calderón	First Lady of El Salvador; 1999–2004	Succeeded by Ana Ligia Mixco Sol de Saca
