= Gabriela Rodríguez de Bukele =

First Lady of El Salvador since 2019

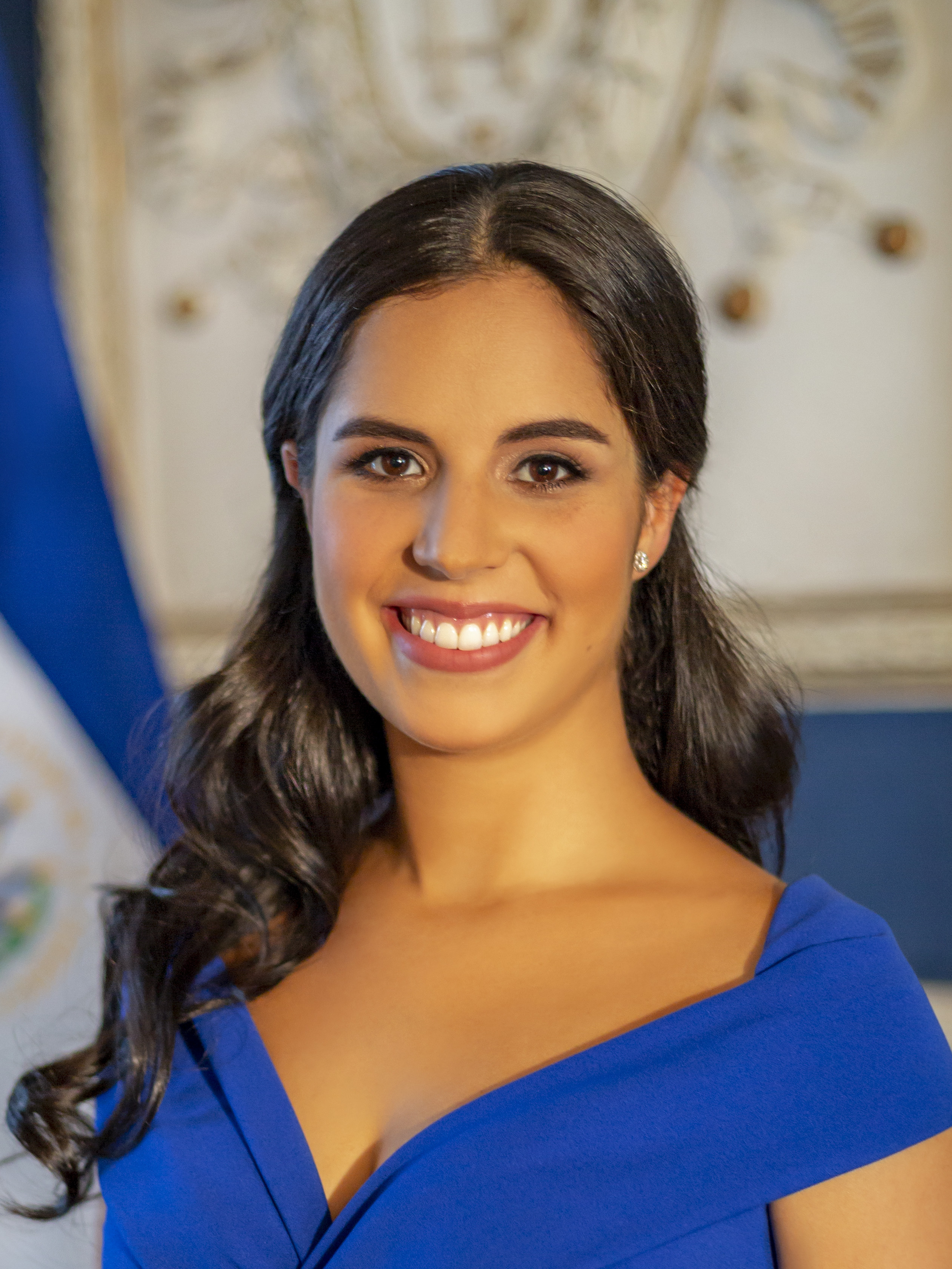
- Official portrait, 2019

First Lady of El Salvador
- Current
- Assumed role 1 June 2019
- President: Nayib Bukele
- Preceded by: Margarita Villalta de Sánchez

Personal details
- Born: Gabriela Roberta Rodríguez y Pérez-Alonso; 31 March 1985 (age 41) San Salvador, El Salvador
- Party: Nuevas Ideas
- Spouse: Nayib Bukele (m. 2014)
- Children: 2

Gabriela Roberta Rodríguez de Bukele (née Rodríguez y Pérez-Alonso; 31 March 1985) is a Salvadoran educator, prenatal psychologist, and the current first lady of El Salvador, as the wife of the 43rd president of El Salvador, Nayib Bukele. She is also a professional ballet dancer and is part of the dance company Fundación Ballet de El Salvador.

Rodríguez was born in San Salvador. She holds a doctorate in prenatal psychology and founded PrePare, the first center for prenatal teaching in El Salvador, in October 2010. She married Bukele in 2014 and served as Secretary for Women during his tenure as Mayor of San Salvador (2015–2018), when she helped to create projects supporting women's rights and culture. Rodríguez founded the San Salvador Ballet group during her time as Secretary for Women in San Salvador.

After Bukele's victory at the 2019 Salvadoran presidential election, Rodríguez was involved in the selection process for the government's cabinet.

== Early life ==
Gabriela Roberta Rodríguez y Pérez-Alonso was born on 31 March 1985 in San Salvador, the capital of El Salvador. She is the youngest of four daughters and her husband has claimed she has Sephardic Jewish ancestry. Her father is José Roberto Rodríguez Trabanino, a Salvadoran investor, while her mother, Arena Pérez-Alonso, is a Nicaraguan who served as a member of the Chamber of Commerce and Industry in El Salvador. She showed an interest in ballet at an early age and joined the dance company Fundación Ballet de El Salvador.

== Career ==
Rodríguez holds a doctorate in prenatal psychology, and is the first person in El Salvador with that title. She founded PrePare in October 2010, the country's first center of prenatal teaching, of which she is the director. Rodríguez is also the regional representative to the Association For Prenatal And Perinatal Psychology And Health (APPPAH).

=== Involvement in politics ===
Rodríguez has worked closely with her husband during his political career. Bukele described her in 2016 as his partner and said, "Whoever votes for me for a public office knows that she comes with the package. That is how we are, a team, since twelve years ago, when we first met". During Bukele's mayoralty of San Salvador with the Farabundo Martí National Liberation Front (FMLN) from 2015 to 2018, Rodríguez served ad honorem as the Municipal Secretary for Women. While in this role, she helped create the first Culture Secretariat of the Mayoralty of San Salvador, the San Salvador Ballet group and the Secretariat for Women.

After being expelled from the FMLN on 10 October 2017, Bukele founded a new political party called Nuevas Ideas, and ran for the presidency of El Salvador as a candidate of the Grand Alliance for National Unity (GANA). With Nuevas Ideas, Rodríguez founded and became the director of the program Bienestar Social in 2018. After Bukele's victory at the 2019 Salvadoran presidential election, Rodríguez became involved in the selection of the Cabinet, mostly for the social, health and education portfolios. She was also responsible for the education bills proposed by the government. During and after the electoral campaign, Rodríguez refused to give interviews to the national media. Her government positions and those of Bukele's relatives, have been criticized by Salvadoran publications such as La Prensa Gráfica and El Faro, which have accused the president of nepotism.

== Personal life ==
Rodríguez is a professional ballet dancer and part of the dance company Fundación Ballet of El Salvador. She began dating Bukele in 2004 and they married on 6 December 2014 in a private ceremony in El Boquerón, San Salvador. She announced her pregnancy days before Bukele won the presidential elections. Their child, Layla, was born on 15 August 2019. The couple's second child, Aminah, was born on 8 November 2023.

Honorary titles
| Preceded by Margarita Villalta de Sánchez | First Lady of El Salvador; 2019–present | Current holder |
