= Arturo Zablah =

Arturo Zablah Khuri (San Salvador, El Salvador, 1954) is an engineer and Salvadoran politician of Palestinian origin.

He graduated from the University of Monterrey in Mexico, with a degree in industrial engineering in 1976. Zablah then earned a master's degree in Systems Analysis at the Georgia Institute of Technology in the United States, in 1981 .

He has worked as an industrial engineer and consultant to large manufacturing companies. He was appointed Minister of Foreign Trade of 1989, then served as Minister of Economy in the government of Alfredo Cristiani (1989-1994), and was president of the Autonomous Executive Port Commission of El Salvador (CEPA) (1994-1998) during the presidency of Armando Calderon Sol (1994-1999).

In the Salvadoran presidential election in 2009, he was a candidate for Vice President of the Republic of El Salvador for the right-wing ARENA party, having Rodrigo Ávila as the presidential nominee.
