= Ana Ligia Mixco Sol de Saca =

First Lady of El Salvador

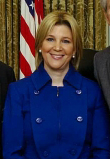

First Lady of El Salvador
- In role June 1, 2004 – June 1, 2009
- President: Antonio Saca
- Preceded by: Lourdes Rodríguez de Flores
- Succeeded by: Vanda Pignato

Personal details
- Born: December 1, 1961 (age 63) Santa Tecla, El Salvador
- Spouse: Antonio Saca (m. 1989)
- Children: Three

Ana Ligia Mixco Sol de Saca (born December 1, 1961) is a Salvadoran businesswoman who served as the First Lady of El Salvador from 2004 to 2009. She is married to former President Antonio Saca.

Mixco, the daughter of Ana María Sol de Mixco and José Mauricio Mixco Orellana, was born on December 1, 1961, in Santa Tecla, La Libertad Department, El Salvador. She attended Colegio Fátima for elementary school before studying at Centro Berkely. In 1982, she represented La Libertad Department as a contestant in the Miss El Salvador pageant.

She first met Antonio Saca on January 11, 1988. The couple married on August 11, 1989, and had three children, Gerardo Antonio, Jose Alejandro and Christian Eduardo. In 1993, she and her husband co-founded SAMIX Group, a media company, with Mixco serving as SAMIX's vice president.

In 2006, First Lady Ana Ligia Mixco de Saca served as the honorary chairperson of the organizing committee for Special Olympics' Latin American Games, which took place in San Salvador from March 28 to April 2, 2006. This marked the first time that the Special Olympics had held in Latin America.

On January 5, 2021, both Ana Ligia de Saca and her husband, who was already serving a 10 year prison sentence after pleading guilty in September 2018 to separate corruption charged, were found guilty of illicit enrichment and were ordered to repay the El Salvador government $4.4 million. On June 4, 2021, Ana Ligia de Saca and her brother Oscar Edgardo Sol Mixco would be sentenced to 10 years in prison money laundering Friday and was ordered to repay $17.6 million to the El Salvador government.

Honorary titles
Preceded by Lourdes Rodríguez de Flores	First Lady of El Salvador; 2004–2009	Succeeded by Vanda Pignato
