= Rodrigo Ávila =

Salvadoran politician

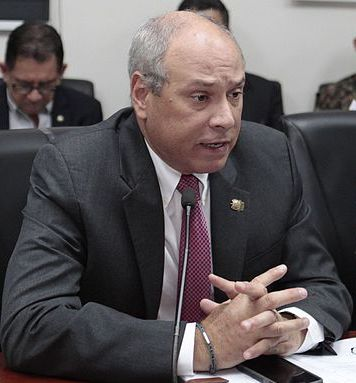

Deputy of the Legislative Assembly of El Salvador from La Libertad
- In office 1 May 2015 – 1 May 2024
- In office 1 May 2003 – 1 May 2006

Personal details
- Born: Rodrigo Ávila Avilés; 24 June 1964 (age 61) San Salvador, El Salvador
- Party: Nationalist Republican Alliance
- Spouse: Celina Denys de Ávila
- Children: 2
- Occupation: Politician

Rodrigo Ávila (born 25 June 1964) is a Salvadoran politician. He stood as the presidential candidate for the Nationalist Republican Alliance during the 2009 Salvadoran presidential election. Upon his nomination, Ávila also became the president of ARENA. He lost to Mauricio Funes of the Farabundo Martí National Liberation Front (FMLN), making him the first ARENA candidate to lose a presidential election since Roberto D'Aubuisson in 1984.

== Personal life and education ==
Rodrigo Ávila is married to Celina Denys de Ávila, his second wife, and has two daughters and one stepdaughter. He is the youngest of four children; his father is Roberto Ávila Moreira, a local medical doctor, and Thelma Avilez, a homemaker originally from Nicaragua.

He graduated from a local Catholic High School, Liceo Salvadoreño, in 1982, and graduated with an engineering degree in Industrial Engineering from North Carolina State University in Raleigh, North Carolina. United States, in 1988. Ávila has also studied mathematics and administration at Gainesville State College and police science at Texas A&M University and the FBI National Academy.

== Professional life ==
After his return to El Salvador from college, Ávila worked briefly for the local Shell subsidiary as Regional Sales Manager for lubrication products. He left the company in 1993 to join as Sub-Director of the recently created National Civil Police (PNC), which substituted the old military police abolished during the peace accords of 1992. After the resignation of the PNC's first director, Dr. José María Monterrey, Ávila assumed the top post as interim director, until his thirtieth birthday, when he was finally confirmed as permanent Director (the charter of the PNC states that the director must be thirty years of age or older). Ávila held this post until 1999, when the new administration of Francisco Flores Pérez took over in June.

Rodrigo Ávila's family was involved from the beginnings in the establishment of ARENA, with his older brother Roberto being one of the party's founding fathers. Ávila himself was not substantially involved in partisan politics until he was asked by the ARENA leadership to run as mayor of Santa Tecla, a small suburb of San Salvador. He lost to the incumbent mayor Óscar Ortiz, of the FMLN party in 2000.

For the next three years, Ávila worked as a security consultant, and as partner of a security firm. In 2003 he was elected to the Legislative Assembly representing La Libertad, where he was named deputy chief of the legislative faction of ARENA.

After one term in the national legislature, Ávila was named Viceminister of Security in the administration of President Antonio Saca until he resigned to become, once again, Director of the National Civil Police.

== Sources ==
- D’Aubuisson estaría orgulloso de mí, Entrevista con Rodrigo Ávila El Faro Electronic News Magazine (in Spanish)
- RODRIGO PRESIDENTE Official Campaign Website (in Spanish)
- Derecha salvadoreña elige candidato presidencial a Rodrigo Avila, March 15, 2008 (in Spanish)
- Rodrigo Ávila's official biography (in Spanish)
- Rodrigo Ávila candidato por ARENA, BusinessLeone.com, March 15, 2008 (in Spanish)
