= Externado San José =

Location
- 33 Avenida Norte; San Salvador; El Salvador
- Coordinates: 13°42′27.32″N 89°12′28.89″W

Information
- Type: Private primary and secondary school
- Religious affiliation: Catholicism
- Denomination: Jesuits
- Established: 1921; 105 years ago
- Rector: Jaime Parra, S.J.
- Principal: María Hernández Alvarenga
- Headmaster: Héctor Zamora López
- Staff: 95 teachers
- Gender: Co-educational (since 1970s)
- Enrollment: 1,818
- Campus size: 19 acres (8 ha)
- Color: Green
- Mascot: Parrot
- Nickname: Externado, EX, ESJ
- Affiliations: FLACSI
- Origin: San Jose Seminary (1921)
- Website: www.externado.edu.sv

Externado San Jose is a private Catholic primary and secondary school located in San Salvador, El Salvador. The institution began in 1921 as San Jose Seminary to which "outsiders" were later admitted. When the seminarians moved to a new facility the remaining school became an "externado". The school was founded and is run by the Society of Jesus.

In 2015 Externado was ranked fourth among 440 schools in El Salvador by the University of El Salvador on the basis of test scores, and had a larger enrollment than the first three schools combined.

== Brief history ==
In 1921 the Jesuits founded San José School seminary school, in the center of San Salvador next to San José Church (later destroyed by fire). Later "outsiders" not contemplating the priesthood were admitted for baccalaureate studies. to the school, which included boarding and day students. Years later the seminarians moved to the new seminary of San José de la Montaña. Those remaining justified the name "externs" or San Jose Externado.

In the 1940s work began on a new school with more adequate facilities on the outskirts of San Salvador, the school's present location. Four Jesuit brothers from the Basque area of Spain did much of the construction at 25 North or "university" Avenue. The primary division moved there in 1954 and the secondary school in 1955. In 1963 the chapel of St. Ignatius of Loyola was built with a capacity for a thousand people. In 1956 the night school, Loyola Academy, was founded to tend to the needs of workers and employees. In 1972 an evening shift was added, to better serve the poor. In 1978, co-education was introduced.

On 10 October 10, 1986, the San Salvador earthquake critically damaged the three-story building, and it had to be demolished. While new facilities were being constructed the primary school met in the chapel and the Baccalaureate at Central American University (UCA). In 1988 the new and current facilities were opened, with financial help from Jesuits provinces outside El Salvador.

== Mission ==
San Jose is academically selective; its students have ranked highest in the Learning and Academic Aptitude Test scores (PAES) since its inception in 1997. Externado San José was long considered a school for the elites, but after the Second Vatican Council and the Conference of Latin American Bishops at Medellin in the 1960s, the Jesuits and staff determined to make education more accessible to the poor. They initiated a sliding scale for tuition, based on family income. No longer seen as elitist, the school nonetheless has maintained high admission and academic performance standards. For secondary students, low grades and/or demerits in personal conduct can lead to expulsion. At the same time, Christian Formation courses took on the goal of forming men and women devoted to serving their society. This included some elements of Liberation Theology which would bridge the deep social divide in El Salvador. At the time, many upscale families withdrew their children from the school, and six Jesuits at their sister school UCA would become martyrs for their open opposition to the elitist government.

Externado San José still operates with this system of differentiated quotas, and remains coeducational. Its graduates include many prominent Salvadoreans, among them former presidents Armando Calderón Sol and Mauricio Funes, and the internationally acclaimed poet Roque Dalton.

== Academics ==
The last year of preschool and nine years of primary school meet from 7:00 a.m. to 12:30 p.m. Besides usual subjects children receive classes in Christian formation, sports, music, crafts, English (from second grade), and chess (from third grade). This is followed by two years of Baccalaureate meeting from 7:00 a.m. to 4:15 p.m. From grade seven on, group work and creativity are promoted along with various forms of research, fostering development in the group and emotional maturity. These programs are supplemented by physical education, Christian training, computer skills, and study skills.

The Evening Shift covers grades 4 through 9, with a school day from 1:00 to 6:15 p.m. Many, but not all, students in this shift receive financial assistance according to their family's proven need.

== Facilities ==
The school campus occupies about 19 acres in the middle of San Salvador. It includes six blocks for classrooms plus laboratories for physics, chemistry, and biology, two computer rooms, two projection rooms, and rooms for music, crafts, and chess. The school library contains about 25,000 volumes and includes a separate reading room and group work room. St. Ignatius of Loyola Chapel seats a thousand people and Mary Queen of Peace Chapel holds fifty. There is an auditorium seating seven hundred people and another seating two hundred.

Sports facilities include a 25-meter swimming pool, soccer fields including one regulation and surrounded by a track, three volleyball courts, and three basketball courts.

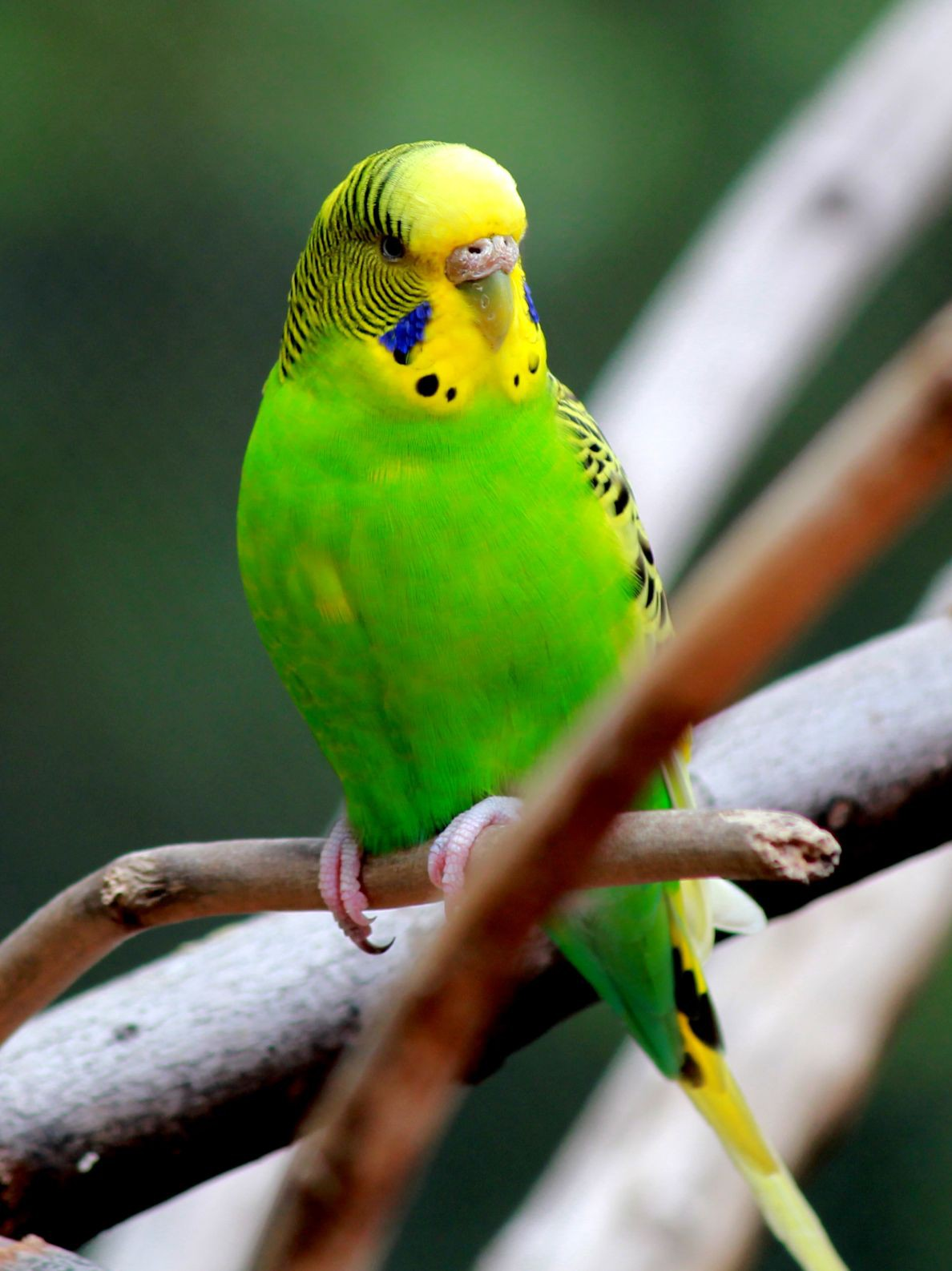

== Symbols ==
The flowering staff in the upper left symbolizes Saint Joseph and several volcanoes in the upper right symbolize Jesuit work in the Central American Province. The lower left has the coat of arms of Ignatius of Loyola, founder of the Jesuits, and the bottom right has the letters "AMDG" taken from the Latin for the Ignatian motto, "To the greater glory of God." The parrot is the mascot of the school, usually portrayed by a cute rendering of a parakeet, a very common bird in Central America.

== Pastoral department ==
In line with the Jesuit objective of training men and women for others, throughout the year various activities are carried out such as coexistence, retreats, Christian formation classes, and community celebrations (Pentecost, Easter, Confirmations...). To encounter people who live in poverty and are marginalized in the country, regular visits are arranged to institutions for children, for young people, and for the elderly, people who are often at risk, abused, or deprived of their basic needs; this is followed by group reflection. The school is a part of the Ignatians for Haiti drive among Jesuit schools in Latin America.

== Culture and communications ==
The Department of Communications and Cultural Activities (DECOMACCU) offers three programs which run throughout the year. Periqueando newsletter is produced for elementary (K – 6) and Perquiting for secondary (7 – 11) students. Student activities of a cultural, athletic, pastoral, or social nature are covered. Festivals and cultural contests discover, promote, and reward the creative and artistic talents of students, through writing (composition, poetry, and narrative), speaking (oratory and declamation), and performing (music, drawing, theater, and dance). Their best literary efforts are published in Green Letter Anthology, which can be viewed online. Occasionally cultural events are staged within the school, featuring prominent artistic groups.

== Sports ==
Students in ninth grade through high school take physical education, which teaches swimming, basketball, volleyball, soccer, and fitness. Intramural tournaments are also conducted for students from first grade through high school, in soccer, swimming, volleyball, basketball, kickball, and track and field. The more skilled students compete at various levels in interscholastic sports in basketball, as well as in soccer and volleyball which also have national championships.

== See also ==
- Education in El Salvador
- List of Jesuit schools
