= Francisco Flores Pérez =

President of El Salvador from 1999 to 2004

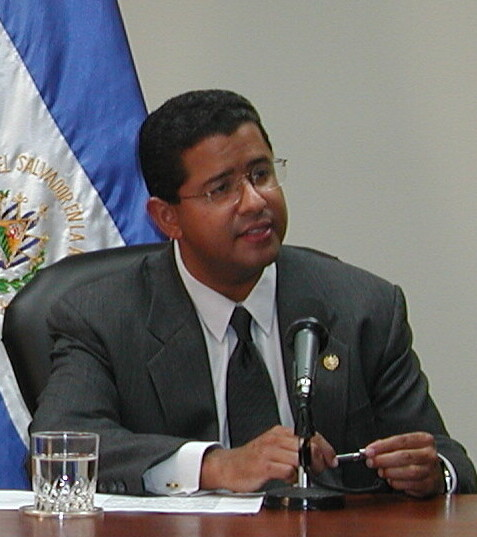
- Flores in 2001

39th President of El Salvador
- In office 1 June 1999 – 1 June 2004
- Vice President: Carlos Quintanilla Schmidt
- Preceded by: Armando Calderón Sol
- Succeeded by: Antonio Saca

96th President of the Legislative Assembly of El Salvador
- In office 1 May 1997 – 1 May 1998
- Preceded by: Gloria Salguero Gross
- Succeeded by: Juan Duch Martínez

Deputy of the Legislative Assembly of El Salvador from San Salvador
- In office 1 May 1994 – 1 June 1999

Personal details
- Born: Francisco Guillermo Flores Pérez; 17 October 1959 Santa Ana, El Salvador
- Died: 30 January 2016 (aged 56) San Salvador, El Salvador
- Party: Nationalist Republican Alliance
- Spouse: Lourdes Rodríguez de Flores
- Children: 2

Francisco Guillermo Flores Pérez (17 October 1959 – 30 January 2016) was a Salvadoran politician who served as the 39th President of El Salvador from 1 June 1999 to 1 June 2004 as a member of the conservative Nationalist Republican Alliance (ARENA). He previously served as a deputy of the Legislative Assembly from 1994 to 1999, having been president of the Assembly from 1997 to 1999.

Flores was born in Santa Ana. He entered politics in the Alfredo Cristiani administration, serving various positions until his election to the Legislative Assembly, of which he became president after three years. He successfully ran for president in 1999. His administration was characterized by close alignment with the United States, including the adoption of the U.S. dollar. After the end of his presidency, he unsuccessfully ran for Secretary General of the Organization of American States.

Flores was accused in May 2014 of pocketing US$15 million donated by Taiwan, intended for survivors of the January and February 2001 El Salvador earthquakes, which occurred during his presidency. He was the first former Salvadoran president to be indicted and tried on corruption charges. He was placed under house arrest, but died before he could stand trial.

== Background ==
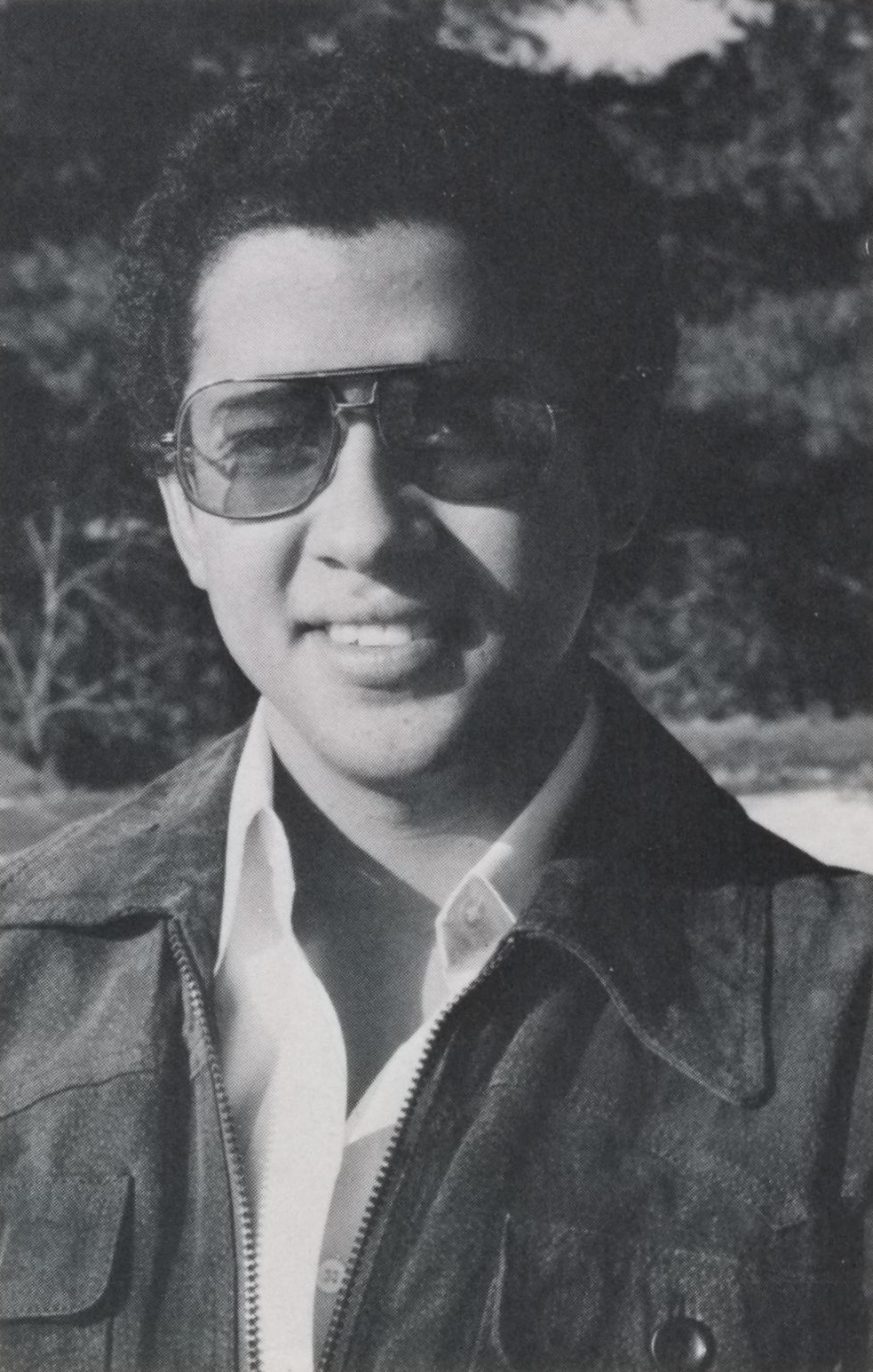
Flores in the Amherst College yearbook, 1981

Flores was born on 17 October 1959, in the city of Santa Ana, the capital of Santa Ana Department. He was one of three children of Maria Leonor Pérez de Flores, an ethnographer and folklorist, and Ulises Flores, an economist. Flores graduated from the Escuela Americana El Salvador. He earned an associate degree in sociology from the University of Hartford's Hillyer College, then, majored in political science at Amherst College in Massachusetts, United States, and received a master's degree in philosophy at World University, California. He also studied law, philosophy and economic development at Harvard University and history and literature at Trinity College, Oxford. He entered politics shortly before the assassination of his father-in-law, who was chief of staff to Alfredo Cristiani.

== Political career ==
Flores started his political career as a vice-minister for planning during Alfredo Cristiani's presidency in 1989. Later he served as a vice-minister of the Presidency, with functions as adviser of the head of state, and directed the plan of governmental action in accordance with the peace accords of January 1992 that ended fighting with the Farabundo Martí National Liberation Front (FMLN) guerilla group.

In the elections of 20 March 1994, Flores was elected to the Legislative Assembly and the new president, Armando Calderón Sol, made him Secretary of Information of the Presidency.

In 1997, Flores was elected as the President of the Legislative Assembly. The Law of Telecommunications was signed during his presidency of the Legislative Assembly, in which the former government-owned telecommunication company ANTEL was split and sold to two private enterprises. This was supported with approval from ARENA, PCN and PDC, imitating the neoliberal system that supported the administration of governmental agencies by the private enterprise, to improve telecommunication network coverage.

On 29 March 1998, ARENA announced Flores as their candidate for the presidential election of the following year. He was considered a moderate within the party. At the age of 37 (the youngest chief executive on the continent at that time), Flores became the third consecutive president from ARENA by winning an outright majority in the elections in March 1999, and took office on 1 June 1999. He served his five-year term and was succeeded by another member of his political party, Elías Antonio Saca, in July 2004.

== Presidency (1999–2004) ==
Flores's government was characterized by its close alignment with United States policies. El Salvador was one of the steadiest allies of the U.S. government in the region. Three undertakings during his term best exemplify Flores's commitment to close US-Salvadoran relations: First, Flores authorized the deployment of Salvadoran troops to Iraq in support of U.S. forces. Second, during his term a successful free-trade agreement was negotiated between the United States and the Central American region, with the late addition of the Dominican Republic to the roster of participating nations; this agreement was ratified recently by most of the region's countries as well as the U.S. Congress. Finally, Flores was the architect of the Salvadoran economy's migration from its historical currency, the colón, to the U.S. dollar.

Dollarization was an extremely controversial measure, both lauded and panned by local and foreign opinion. From the standpoint of the country's business establishment, dollarization brought about great benefits, such as reduced interest rates (which came about by eliminating currency-exchange risk among other factors), easier trade with other commercial partners and an easier integration onto the global market.

His tenure was marked by an unprecedented rise in the homicide rate, which doubled between 2002 and 2006.

=== Criticism ===
Flores's tenure was not without its critics. His actions to further align El Salvador with the United States were widely criticized by his political opponents. In the same manner, he was faulted for an autocratic style of governance, which allowed for very little compromise or consultation with the opposition. The lack of flexibility exemplified by his government resulted in a number of crippling strikes, most notably one led by the medical professionals in an attempt to forestall threatened privatization of the country's public health facilities.

Critics of Flores's dollarization efforts accused him of doing so without popular consensus, except exclusively with bankers. Even though the replacement of Colones with dollars proved to reduce interest rates, it also caused huge long-term inflation as prices were rounded upwards.

Flores also had to deal with reconstruction efforts after two powerful earthquakes struck the country on 13 January 2001. Delivery of international aid was inefficient and was criticized by reporters, especially Mauricio Funes (who later became President of El Salvador) from the local channel TV12, an affiliate of the Mexican company TV Azteca.

Some of Flores's opponents also contended that escalating violence and increasing poverty occurred during his term, but statistics from the World Bank show that poverty did, in fact, decrease during the Flores administration.

Another occurrence was the Summit of the Americas where Flores called Fidel Castro a "dictator" and accused him of being responsible for thousands of deaths which have occurred in El Salvador.

== Candidacy for OAS Secretary General ==
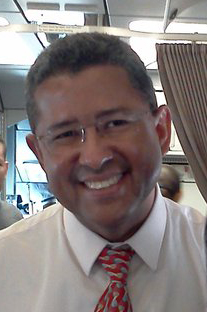
Flores in May 2012

Even before he left office, Flores had expressed his interest in running for the office of Secretary General of the Organization of American States, a post which was won in late 2004 by Miguel Ángel Rodríguez an ex-president from Costa Rica. Later, Rodríguez had to resign from this post when he was indicted in his country for alleged acts of corruption during his tenure as president, a situation which called for an extraordinary election for his successor. Flores once again expressed his intentions of seeking the post, but after much campaigning, had to withdraw due to lack of support from other member states (even though he counted the United States as his chief backer). This situation could be explained because some of his policies were seen as being to closely aligned to US interests at a time when most Latin American governments were highly critical of the positions adopted by the United States. He was the first US-backed candidate not elected to this post since the establishment of the organization.

== Corruption charges ==
At the time of his death, Flores was, along with several other key actors in the deal, being investigated by the Salvadoran Attorney General on corruption and disobedience charges. These recommendations now face scrutiny and debate in the Legislative Assembly. Attorney General Luis Martínez was to have taken up the case against the late former president despite his own prior history of having worked in the previous ARENA administration of Tony Saca and having been Flores's partner in several businesses.

Judge Marta Rosales asked Interpol for help in arresting Flores. He had been charged with stealing $15 million that was donated in 2003 by Taiwan's government during his presidency.

A further charge of disobedience accused Flores of failing to show up for a meeting with a congressional commission investigating what happened to the money Taiwan donated. On 6 September 2014, it was announced that Flores had voluntarily surrendered to the local authorities after months in hiding. He had been living under house arrest in El Salvador since November 2014. On 3 December 2015, Judge Miguel Angel Garcia ordered Flores to stand trial.

In October 2021, his name was mentioned in the Pandora Papers. He was the beneficiary of several companies created in Panama in 2005 and in the British Virgin Islands in 2006.

== Personal life ==
Flores met his wife, Lourdes Rodríguez de Flores, in high school in San Salvador. They had two children, Juan Marcos and Gabriela.

=== Death ===
In early January 2016, Flores suffered a cerebral hemorrhage. On 30 January 2016, Flores died, aged 56, in a private hospital in San Salvador while in a coma after undergoing emergency surgery and suffering irreversible neurological damage.

== Honours ==
=== Foreign honours ===
- Monaco : Grand Cross of the Order of Grimaldi (20 July 2001).

Political offices
| Preceded by Armando Calderón | President of El Salvador; 1999 – 2004 | Succeeded by Antonio Saca |
