= Salvador Sánchez Cerén =

President of El Salvador from 2014 to 2019

His Excellency Salvador Sánchez Cerén
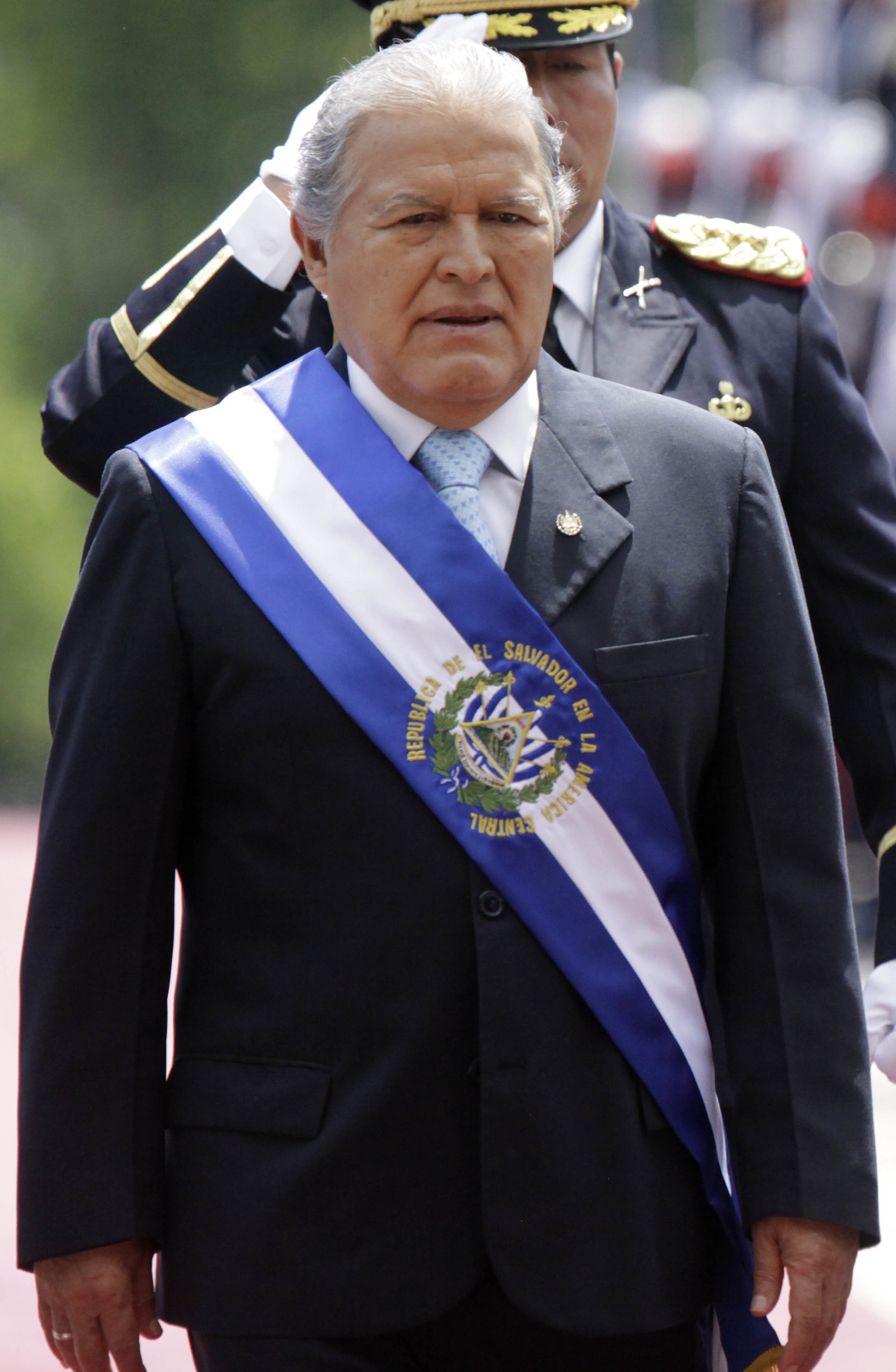
- Sánchez Cerén in 2015

42nd President of El Salvador
- In office 1 June 2014 – 1 June 2019
- Vice President: Óscar Ortiz
- Preceded by: Mauricio Funes
- Succeeded by: Nayib Bukele

48th Vice President of El Salvador
- In office 1 June 2009 – 1 June 2014
- President: Mauricio Funes
- Preceded by: Ana Vilma de Escobar
- Succeeded by: Óscar Ortiz

Minister of Education of El Salvador
- In office 1 June 2009 – 3 July 2012
- President: Mauricio Funes
- Preceded by: Darlyn Meza
- Succeeded by: Hato Hasbún

Deputy of the Legislative Assembly of El Salvador from San Salvador
- In office 1 May 2000 – 1 May 2009

7th President pro tempore of CELAC
- In office 26 January 2017 – 14 January 2019
- Preceded by: Danilo Medina
- Succeeded by: Evo Morales

Personal details
- Born: 18 June 1944 (age 82) Quezaltepeque, El Salvador
- Citizenship: El Salvador; Nicaragua (since 2021)
- Party: Farabundo Martí National Liberation Front
- Spouse: Margarita Villalta de Sánchez (m. 1968)
- Children: 4
- Education: Escuela Alberto Masferrer
- Occupation: Politician, soldier, teacher
- Cabinet: Cabinet of Salvador Sánchez Cerén

Military service
- Allegiance: Farabundo Martí National Liberation Front
- Branch/service: Farabundo Martí Popular Liberation Forces
- Years of service: 1972–1992
- Rank: Commander
- Battles/wars: Salvadoran Civil War

Salvador Sánchez Cerén (Spanish pronunciation: [salβaˈðoɾ ˈsantʃes seˈɾen]; born 18 June 1944), also known by his nom de guerre Leonel González, is a Salvadoran former politician, guerrilla commander, and school teacher who served as the 42nd president of El Salvador from 2014 to 2019. He took office on 1 June 2014, after winning the 2014 presidential election as the candidate of the left-wing Farabundo Martí National Liberation Front (FMLN). He previously served as the 49th vice president under Mauricio Funes from 2009 to 2014. He was also an FMLN guerrilla leader during the Salvadoran Civil War and is the first former rebel to serve as El Salvador's president.

== Early life ==
Salvador Sánchez Cerén was born in Quezaltepeque, El Salvador, on 18 June 1944. His father was Antoino Alfonso Sánchez, a carpenter and artisan, and his mother was Dolores Hernández, a food vendor. Sánchez Cerén was one of twelve children. His surnames were erroneously registered as "Sánchez Cerén" rather than "Sánchez Hernández" using his maternal grandmother's surname rather than his mother's as per Spanish naming customs. The error was never corrected.

In Sánchez Cerén's youth, he attended the José Dolores Larreynaga Schooling Center for his primary and secondary education. Beginning at the age of 16, he attended the Alberto Masferrer Superior Normal School and studied to become a public school teacher; he graduated in 1963. Sánchez Cerén taught at three schools in La Libertad Department: the Mixed Rural School in Huizúcar from 1963 to 1964, the Mixed Rural School in San Matías from 1964 to 1966, and the Mixed Urban School in Quezaltepeque from 1966 to 1979. In December 1965, he joined the National Association of Salvadoran Educators (ANDES 21 de Junio), the country's first teachers' union.

== Salvadoran Civil War ==
In 1972, Sánchez Cerén joined the Farabundo Martí Popular Liberation Forces (FPL) militant organization. In 1980, following the start of the Salvadoran Civil War in 1979, Sánchez Cerén adopted the pseudonym Commander Leonel González, as he was also appointed to the position of comandante or commander.

In 1983, Sánchez Cerén became the leader of the Farabundo Martí Popular Liberation Forces after its previous leader, Cayetano Carpio, committed suicide in Managua, Nicaragua. Sánchez Cerén also became one of the members of the FMLN General Command.

== Political career ==
In the 2000 legislative election, Sánchez Cerén was elected as a deputy of the FMLN in the Legislative Assembly from the San Salvador Department. Coralia Margarita Polh Alvarado was elected as his alternate deputy. He was re-elected in 2003. He was re-elected for a third time in 2006; Francisco Rubén Alvarado Fuentes was his alternate.

Between 2001 and 2004 he served as the general coordinator of his party. From 2001 to 2004, Sánchez Cerén and Schafik Hándal (the leader of the FMLN during the civil war) were the leaders of the Socialist Revolutionary Current (CRS), the FMLN's "orthodox and radical" ("ortodoxa y radical") faction in the Legislative Assembly. On 27 January 2006, Sánchez Cerén became the FMLN's leader within the Legislative Assembly shortly following Hándal's death, the FMLN's previous legislative leader.

=== Vice President of El Salvador ===
In 2007, reformist FMLN journalist and aspiring presidential candidate Mauricio Funes selected Sánchez Cerén, an orthodox FMLN member, as his vice presidential candidate for the 2009 presidential election. Funes's bid to seek the party's nomination for the 2004 presidential election was vetoed by Hándal as he was not an orthodox member and had no militant background with the FMLN during the civil war. Funes's selection of Sánchez Cerén to be his vice presidential candidate secured him party leadership's support to become the FMLN's 2009 presidential candidacy.

During the 2009 presidential campaign, the right-wing Nationalist Republican Alliance (ARENA) accused Cerén of causing destruction during the civil war, of being responsible for assassinations and kidnappings, and criticized his support for Cuban leader Fidel Castro.

=== President of El Salvador ===
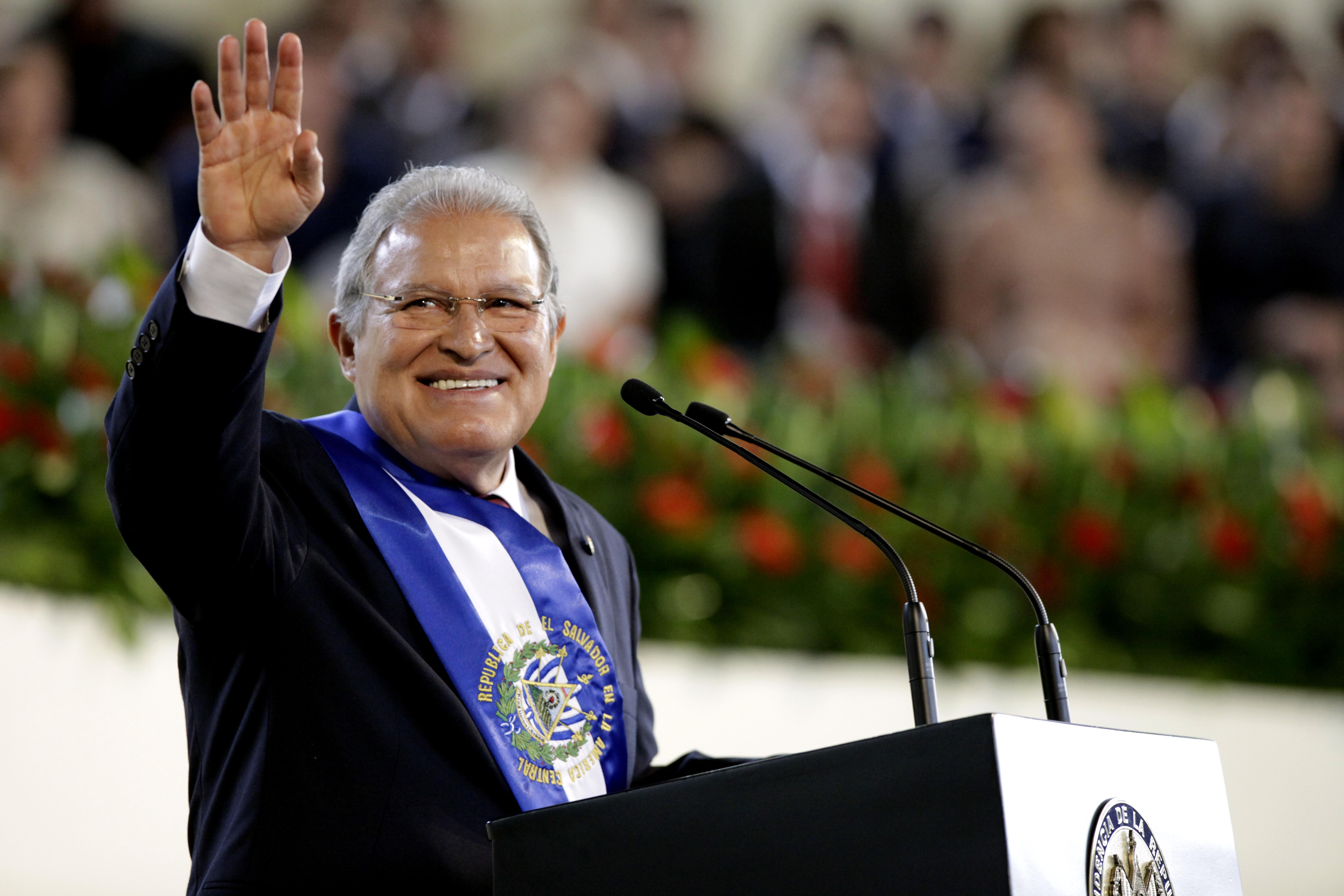
Cerén at his inauguration

In 2012, Sánchez Cerén announced his intention to run for president of El Salvador in the 2014 presidential election. The FMLN nominated Cerén as its presidential candidate and Cerén selected reformist Óscar Ortiz and his vice presidential candidate. During the 2014 presidential campaign, ARENA made similar accusations against Cerén as they had done in 2009.

Sánchez Cerén attained a plurality of votes in the first round but not the majority, so he and Norman Quijano competed in the second round. Sánchez Cerén received 50.11 percent of the vote, compared with 49.89 percent for Quijano. Quijano denounced the result of the election as being fraudulent and called on the armed forces to intervene in the situation, although he later denied calling for such an intervention or coup d'état. The Supreme Electoral Court (TSE) ratified Sánchez Cerén's victory on 13 March 2014 and rejected ARENA's calls for a recount.

Sánchez Cerén became the first former guerrilla commander to become president of El Salvador; he was the third to run for the presidency after Facundo Guardado in 1999 and Hándal in 2004. Sánchez Cerén was also the second former guerrilla to become the president of a Latin American country democratically after Uruguay's José Mujica in 2010. Sánchez Cerén stated that he would form a "national coalition" with right-wing parties and businesses to form a moderate government.

Sánchez Cerén was sworn in as president of El Salvador on 1 June 2014.

From October 2016, his government and the FMLN defended a project of partial legalization of abortion (in case of rape or of danger for the life of the mother) but have had to contend with the right-wing opposition which has blocked the reforms in parliament.

In April 2017, El Salvador became the first country in the world to forbid the mining of metal on its territory, for environmental and public health reasons.

In August 2018, his government decided to establish diplomatic relations with the People's Republic of China, ending El Salvador's relations with the Republic of China (Taiwan).

During Sánchez Cerén's presidency, the Salvadoran economy created 150,000 jobs, and the poverty rate fell from 34% to 29%. Around 23,000 Salvadorans were the victims of homicides, for an average of 13 homicides per day. The homicide rate has dropped from 110 per 100,000 people in 2015 to 50 in 2019.

== Post-presidency ==
In December 2020, Sánchez Cerén and his family left El Salvador for Nicaragua. On 22 July 2021, Salvadoran attorney general Rodolfo Delgado ordered Sánchez Cerén's arrest on charges of embezzlement, illicit enrichment, and money laundering up to $530,000. A few days later, on 30 July 2021, the Nicaraguan ministry of the interior granted Nicaraguan citizenship to Sánchez Cerén, his wife (Margarita Villalta de Sánchez), and three of his children.

In July 2023, Sánchez Cerén was sanctioned by the United States Department of State for "significant corruption by laundering money" as vice president.

== Personal life ==
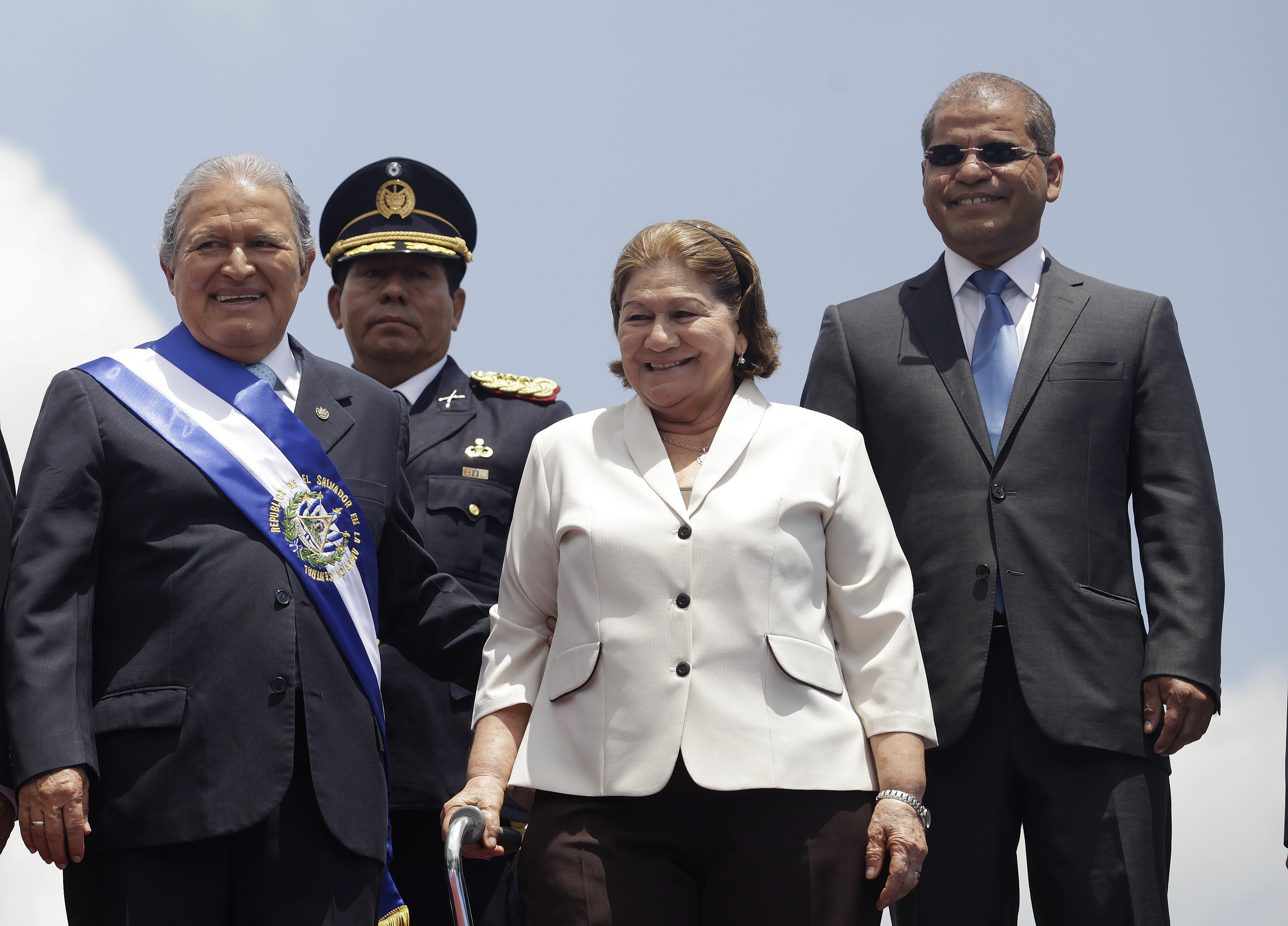
Sánchez Cerén with his wife in 2015

Sánchez Cerén married Villalta in 1968. The couple has four children: Antonio, Claudia, Fátima, and Ivett.

== Electoral history ==
Year	Office	Party	Main opponent and party		Votes for Sánchez Cerén				Result	Swing	Ref.
Year	Office	Party	Main opponent and party		Total	%	P.	±%	Result	Swing	Ref.
2009	Vice President of El Salvador	FMLN	Arturo Zablah	ARENA	1,354,000	51.32	1st	N/A	Won	Gain	
2014	President of El Salvador	FMLN	Norman Quijano	ARENA	1,315,768	48.93	1st	N/A	Runoff	N/A	
2014	President of El Salvador	FMLN	Norman Quijano	ARENA	1,495,815	50.11	1st	N/A	Won	Hold	

== See also ==
- List of heads of state and government who have been in exile

Political offices
Preceded by Darlyn Meza	Minister of Education of El Salvador; 2009–2012	Succeeded by Hato Hasbún
Preceded by Ana Vilma de Escobar	Vice President of El Salvador; 2009–2014	Succeeded by Óscar Ortiz
Preceded by Mauricio Funes	President of El Salvador; 2014–2019	Succeeded by Nayib Bukele
Honorary titles
Preceded by Danilo Medina	President pro tempore of CELAC; 2017–2019	Succeeded by Evo Morales
Party political offices
Preceded by Mauricio Funes (2009)	FMLN nominee for President of El Salvador; 2014	Succeeded by Hugo Martínez (2019)
