= Mauricio Funes =

President of El Salvador from 2009 to 2014

His Excellency Mauricio Funes
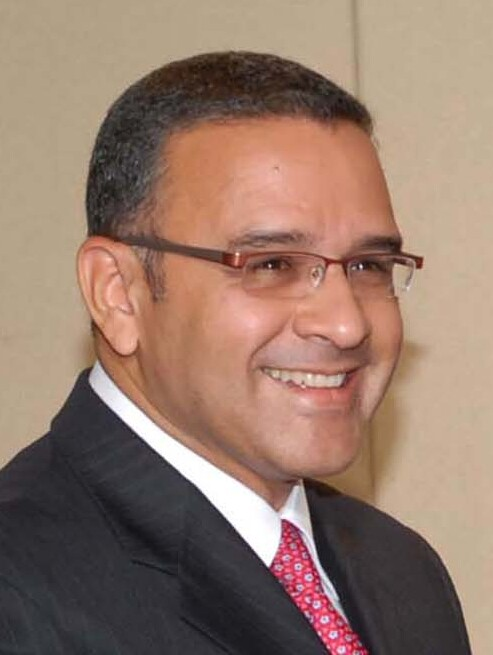
- Funes in 2008

41st President of El Salvador
- In office 1 June 2009 – 1 June 2014
- Vice President: Salvador Sánchez Cerén
- Preceded by: Antonio Saca
- Succeeded by: Salvador Sánchez Cerén

Personal details
- Born: Carlos Mauricio Funes Cartagena; 18 October 1959 San Salvador, El Salvador
- Died: 21 January 2025 (aged 65) Managua, Nicaragua
- Citizenship: El Salvador; Nicaragua (from 2019)
- Party: Farabundo Martí National Liberation Front
- Spouse: Vanda Pignato (m. 1993; sep. 2014)
- Domestic partner: Ada Mitchell Guzmán (2014–2025)
- Children: 4
- Education: Central American University
- Occupation: Politician, journalist
- Cabinet: Cabinet of Mauricio Funes

Carlos Mauricio Funes Cartagena (18 October 1959 – 21 January 2025) was a Salvadoran politician and journalist who served as the 41st president of El Salvador from 2009 to 2014. Funes won the 2009 presidential election as the candidate of the left-wing Farabundo Martí National Liberation Front (FMLN).

Funes resided in exile in Nicaragua from 2016 until his death, while his immediate family continues to reside there, following allegations of criminal conduct during his tenure. In July 2023, he was placed under sanctions by the United States Department of State following his conviction in absentia for negotiations related to the gang truces he made while in office, illicit enrichment, and tax evasion. Funes died in exile in Nicaragua in 2025.

== Early life and education ==
Carlos Mauricio Funes Cartagena was born in San Salvador, El Salvador on 18 October 1959. Funes' parents were Roberto Funes and María Mirna and he had two brothers. Funes completed his high school diplomat at the Jesuit-run Externado San José and graduated as a Bachelor of Arts in Mass Media from the Central American University.

== Journalist career ==
Funes started working as a news reporter for Channel 10 in February 1986. The following year, he started working for Channel 12. He worked as a news director and hosted The Daily Interview program. In 1991, Funes interviewed Schafik Hándal, a guerrilla leader of the Farabundo Martí National Liberation Front (FMLN) during the Salvadoran Civil War, resulting in Channel 12 losing advertisers and coming under public scrutiny. In 1994, Funes was one of four winners of the Maria Moors Cabot Prize from Columbia University for "promoting press freedom and inter-American understanding". He also received awards from UNICEF and the Association of Salvadoran Journalists. Funes also worked as a news corresponded for CNN en Español from 1997 to 2005. Funes left Channel 12 in February 2005 and began working for channels owned by Grupo Megavisión.

== Presidential campaigns ==
Funes sought to gain the FMLN's presidential nomination for the 2004 presidential election. His candidacy was opposed by senior FMLN leaders who argued that Funes was not a historic member of the FMLN and would not be able to unite the party behind his campaign. Funes' candidacy was vetoed by Hándal, by then party's secretary-general. Hándal eventually became the party's nominee but lost to Antonio Saca of the right-wing Nationalist Republican Alliance (ARENA).

Ahead of the 2009 presidential election, the reformist wing of the FMLN led by Óscar Ortiz proposed to selected Funes as its presidential candidate. Senior FMLN leadership accepted Ortiz's proposal on the condition that Salvador Sánchez Cerén, a former FMLN civil war guerrilla leader, would be Funes' vice presidential running mate. Some FMLN members questioned Funes' ideological commitment to the party but accepted Cerén being Funes' running mate as an acceptable concession. Funes officially became the FMLN's presidential candidate on 28 September 2007 becoming the first non-guerrilla to be the party's presidential candidate. His candidacy was registered with the Supreme Electoral Court (TSE) on 2 September 2008.

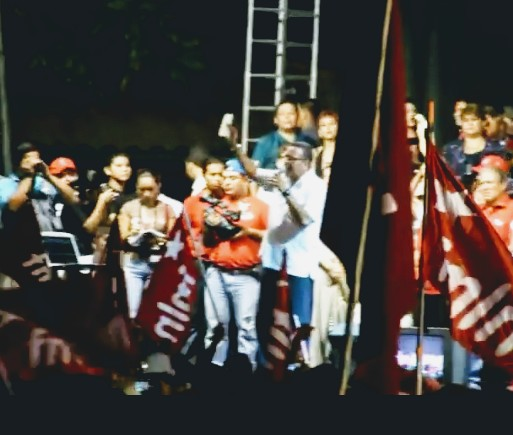
Funes at a campaign rally

Funes' main opponent in the 2009 presidential election was ARENA's Rodrigo Ávila, the former chief of the National Civil Police (PNC). The election was a two-way race between Funes and Ávila after the presidential candidates of the National Conciliation Party (PCN) and Christian Democratic Party both dropped out following poor results in the legislative and local elections two months before the presidential election.

Funes modeled his presidential campaigned off of United States president Barack Obama, using his image in campaign advertisements and adopting Obama's slogan "Yes, we can!". Funes campaigned on combatting tax evasion, creating jobs for Salvadoran expatriates returning from the United States, and investing in the country's agricultural industry. Funes also promised to keep the United States dollar as El Salvador's official currency (dollarization occurred in 2001 under President Francisco Flores Pérez). Ávila accused Funes of being a puppet for the FMLN's senior leadership and other critics believed that Cerén would be the power behind the throne. Critics also claimed that El Salvador would become a Venezuelan satellite state, which Funes denied.

Funes won the 2009 presidential election with 1,354,000 votes (51.32 percent of the popular vote). He was the first member of the FMLN to become President of El Salvador. Funes' election coincided with the Pink Tide phenomenon of Latin America.

== Presidency ==
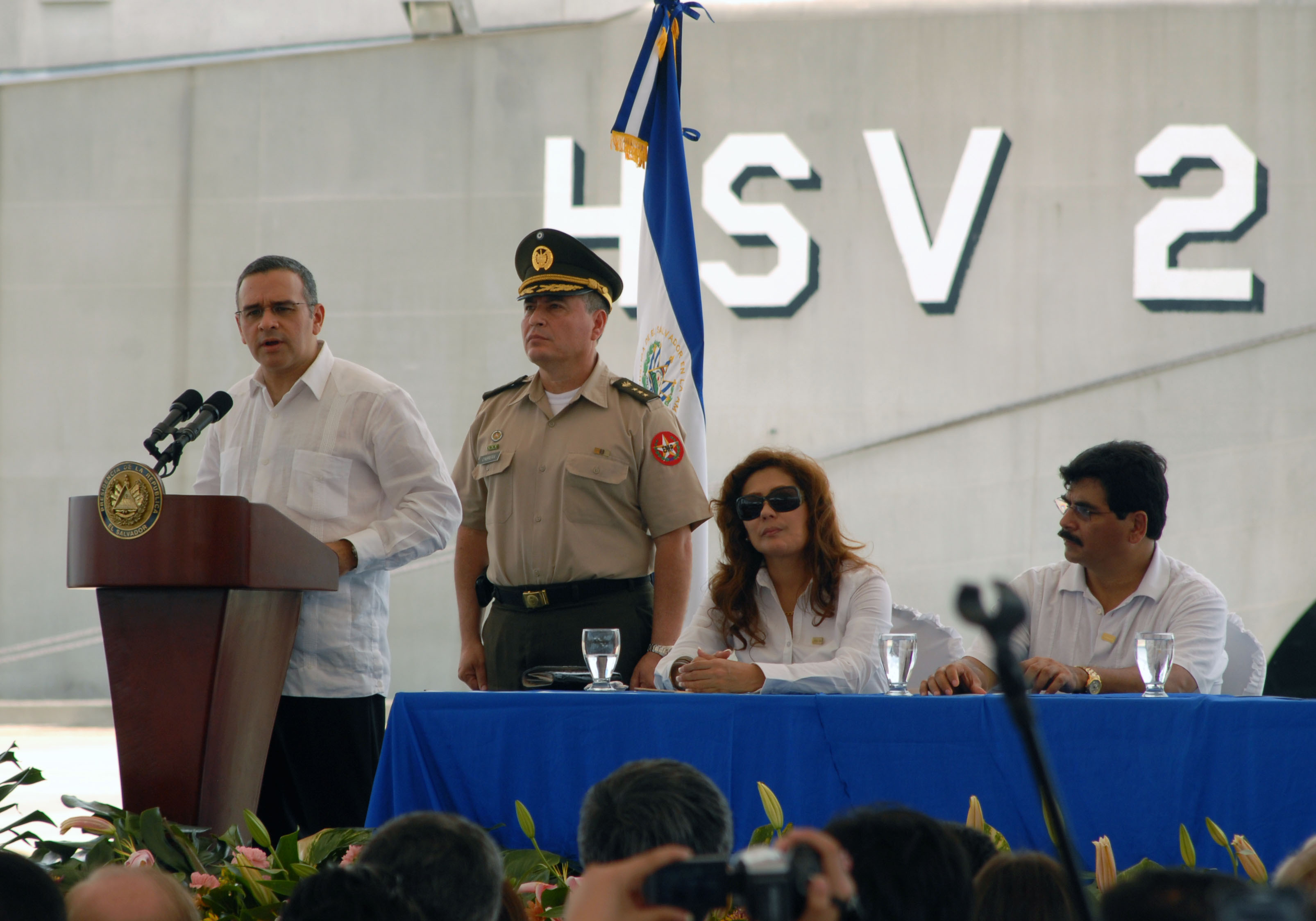
Funes at the opening of a new pier at the La Unión port in 2010

Funes was inaugurated as President of El Salvador on 1 June 2009 marking the first peaceful transition of power since the end of the civil war. That same day, Funes' first act as President was to reestablish diplomatic relations with Cuba after having been severed since the Cuban Revolution 50 years prior. Funes also appointed cabinet consisting of 13 ministers.

After coming to power, Funes's administration implemented a wide range of social reforms designed to combat poverty and inequality, including the institution of various poverty alleviation programs in the most impoverished communities, the abolition of public health care fees, the introduction of free shoes, meals and uniforms for schoolchildren, the distribution of property titles to hundreds of families, the introduction of monthly cash transfers and job training for those living in extreme poverty, and pensions for the elderly. In addition, investments were made in improving school infrastructure, a presidential decree was issued against discrimination on the basis of gender and sexual orientation in the public services, two working groups on indigenous affairs were created as a means of bringing about better representation of the interests of El Salvador's indigenous communities, a community health plan was introduced, teachers' salaries were increased, and measures were introduced to combat illiteracy.

In November 2009, Funes had to face the natural disaster that greatly affected communities in Cuscatlán, San Salvador and San Vicente as a result of the rain brought by Hurricane Ida. A community in San Vicente called Verapaz disappeared because it was buried by huge rocks that fell from the nearby volcano. Civil Protection, which is the government entity in charge of handling catastrophes, rehabilitated public schools in which refugees stayed for more than three months while they found a place to stay from family or friends. The Army and the Red Cross of El Salvador rescued many people from the communities.

Funes was criticized for lack of a plan to fight El Salvador's increased crime. In response, the President ordered the deployment of the army to cooperate with police authorities in their fight against crime. In 2010, there were reports of death squads operating in El Salvador, due in part to a lack of response of the police.

In January 2010, after a public denouncement of Funes's former cabinet member Francisco Gómez, Salvadoran media uncovered plans whereby almost all government publicity and advertising were to be handled, without any previous public tendering process (as required by Salvadoran Law), by advertising agency Polistepeque, S.A. de C.V. Some advisers to the president were members of its board of directors, and allegedly Funes himself had some participation through stock in that agency. In response, Funes said no other advertising agency in El Salvador had the experience or capacity to manage government publicity and advertising, despite the fact that El Salvador has many local and international advertising agencies such as BBDO.

In 2016, Funes denied giving perks to gangs during the 2012–14 truce.

=== Apologies for past atrocities ===
In November 2009, Funes posthumously bestowed the National Order of José Matías Delgado, then El Salvador's highest order, to the six Jesuits murdered by the Salvadoran military in 1989 during the civil war. The orders were given to the victims' families and friends. Funes states that the awards "signify [...] removing a thick veil of darkness and lies to let in the light of justice and truth" ("significa [...] retirar un velo espeso de oscuridad y mentiras para dejar entrar la luz de la justicia y la verdad").

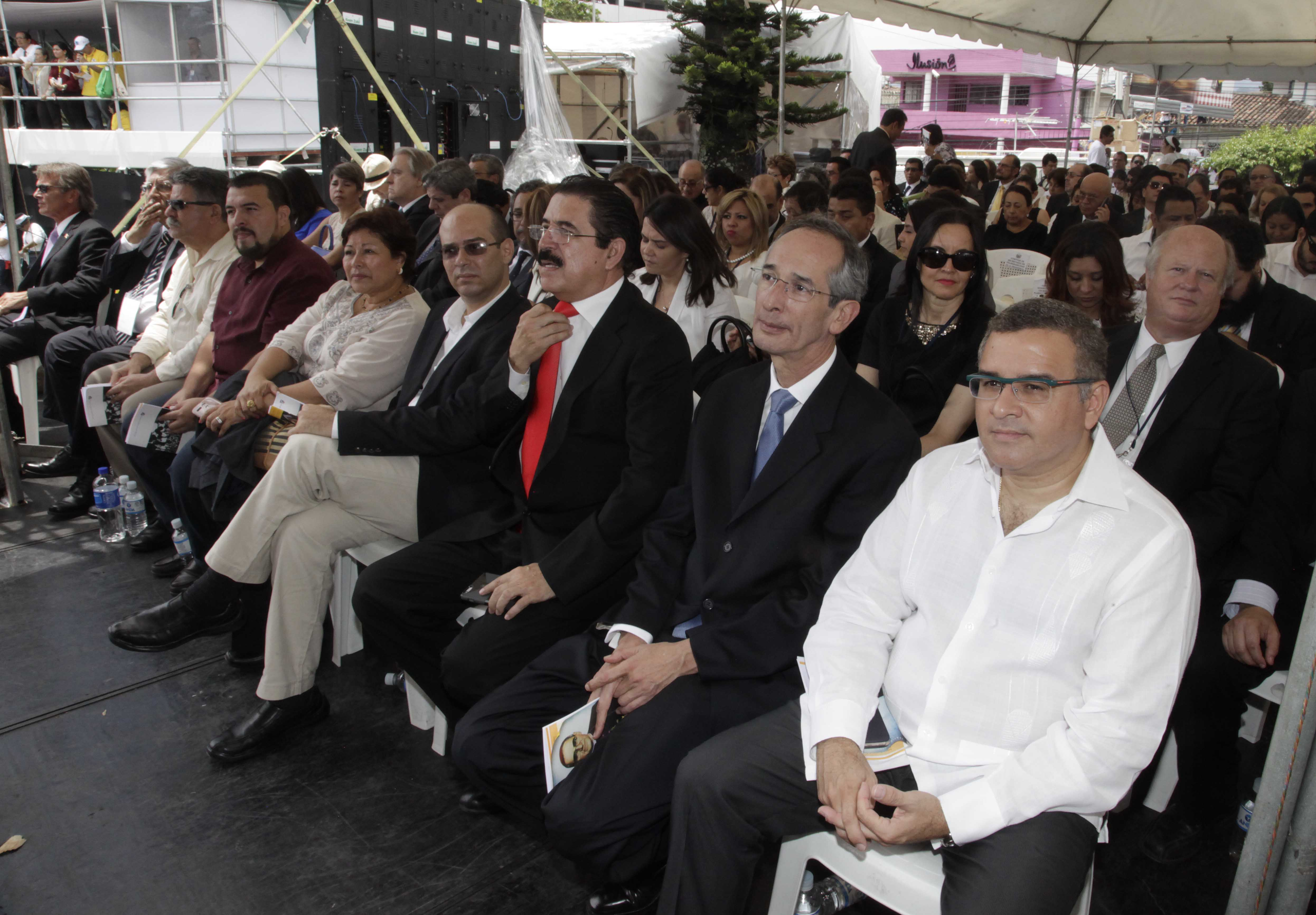
Funes (far-right) at the beatification ceremony of Óscar Romero in 2015

On 16 January 2010 (the 18th anniversary of the end of the Salvadoran Civil War), Funes apologized for Salvadoran government atrocities that occurred during the civil war, stating that "in the name of the state of El Salvador, I ask for pardon". Funes also apologized for the 1981 El Mozote massacre in particular. Armando Calderón Sol, a former President of El Salvador from ARENA, criticized Funes' apology, stating that "the State should never apologize" ("el Estado jamás debió pedir perdón").

On 24 March 2010, Funes apologized for the assassination of Archbishop Óscar Romero on the 30th anniversary of Romero's assassination. Funes declared Romero to be "the spiritual guide of the nation". In 2013, Funes traveled to the Vatican City and met Pope Francis. There, Funes gave Francis a bloodstained portion of Romero's vestment he wore at the time of his assassination. After Funes' presidency, he attended the Romero's beatification ceremony in 2015.

On 12 October 2010 (Columbus Day in El Salvador), Funes apologized to El Salvador's indigenous community for previous atrocities that the Salvadoran government committed against Indigenous Salvadorans, particularly for mass killings following Anastasio Aquino's rebellion in 1832 and La Matanza in 1932. He described the latter as a "genocide" that forced Indigenous Salvadorans to change their indigenous names to avoid further persecution.

== Post-presidency ==
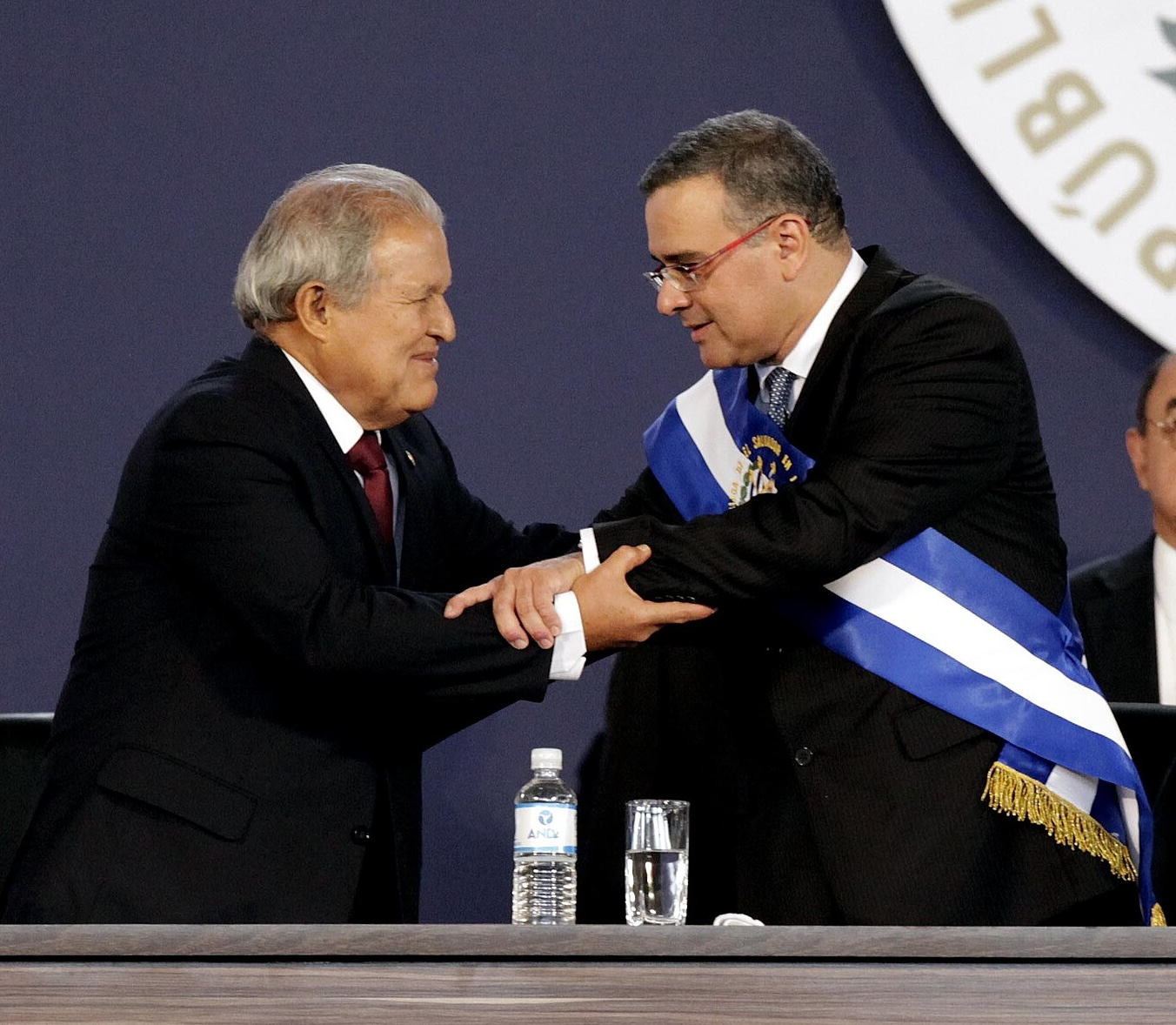
Funes, wearing El Salvador's presidential sash, with Salvador Sánchez Cerén, his presidential successor

=== Criminal charges ===
On 10 February 2016, the Salvadoran Supreme Court ruled that Funes would face a civil trial for charges of illegally laundering more than $700,000 in personal bank accounts. Nicaragua granted Funes political asylum, who was accused of illicit enrichment in El Salvador. Mauricio Funes was not able to justify personal transactions of over $600,000. The formal accusation against Funes stated that he and his family increased their assets without justification for an amount of over US$728,000. The income of the President of El Salvador in 2015, one year after Funes left office, was US$5,181.72 per month. On 28 November 2017, El Salvador's second civil court found Funes guilty of illegal enrichment. The sentence was against Funes and his son who was with him in Nicaragua under asylum protection, ordering that they had to restitute $420,000 to the state. In 2019, Interpol rejected twice the arrest request against Funes.

On 29 May 2023, Funes was sentenced in absentia to 14 years in prison because of negotiations related to the gang truces he made while in office. On 6 July, he was sentenced to an additional six years for tax evasion. In July 2023 he was placed under sanctions by the United States Department of State.

== Personal life ==
=== Family ===
Funes's brother was killed by police during the civil war. His oldest son, Alejandro Funes Velasco, was murdered in Paris, France in 2007 aged 27.

Funes was married to Vanda Pignato, who served as his first lady and as secretary of social inclusion in his cabinet. They had one son, Gabriel. In October 2014, Funes publicly acknowledged that he and Pignato had separated. The political asylum granted to Mauricio Funes by the Government of Nicaragua included his partner, Ada Mitchell Guzmán Sigüenza, as well as his three sons. In July 2019, Funes (along with his wife and two sons) became a naturalized citizen of Nicaragua, where he and his immediate family remained in exile beginning in 2016.

=== Political views ===
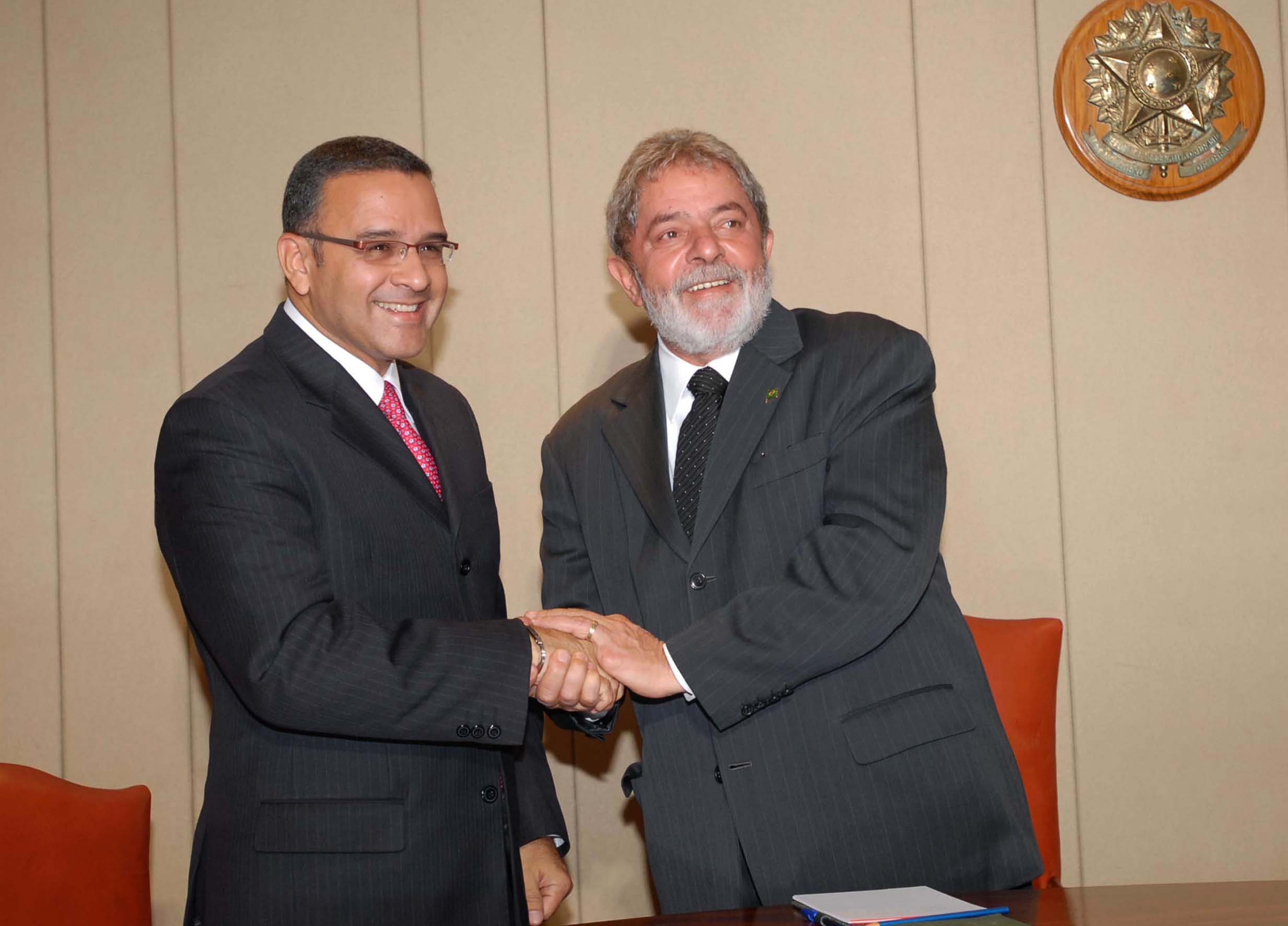
Then-presidential candidate Funes with Brazilian president Luiz Lula da Silva in 2008

Funes described himself as center-left and a moderate leftist. He developed support for leftist ideals during the civil war while interviewing FMLN guerrilla leaders. Funes admired Brazilian president Luiz Inácio Lula da Silva.

== Death ==
Funes died following a "serious chronic illness" at a hospital in Managua, Nicaragua, on 21 January 2025, at the age of 65. He experienced a heart attack on 8 January and was subsequently hospitalized. His family decided that he would be buried in Nicaragua.

== Awards and decorations ==
Mexico

- Collar of the Order of the Aztec Eagle (21 June 2011)

== Electoral history ==
Year	Office	Party	Main opponent and party		Votes for Funes				Result	Swing	Ref.
Year	Office	Party	Main opponent and party		Total	%	P.	±%	Result	Swing	Ref.
2009	President of El Salvador	FMLN	Rodrigo Ávila	ARENA	1,354,000	51.32	1st	N/A	Won	Gain	

== See also ==
- List of heads of state and government who have been in exile

Political offices
Preceded by Antonio Saca	President of El Salvador; 2009–2014	Succeeded by Salvador Sánchez Cerén
Party political offices
Preceded by Schafik Hándal (2004)	FMLN nominee for President of El Salvador; 2009	Succeeded by Salvador Sánchez Cerén (2014)
