= Cabinet of Nayib Bukele =

Current presidential cabinet of El Salvador

- Cabinet of El Salvador
- Incumbent
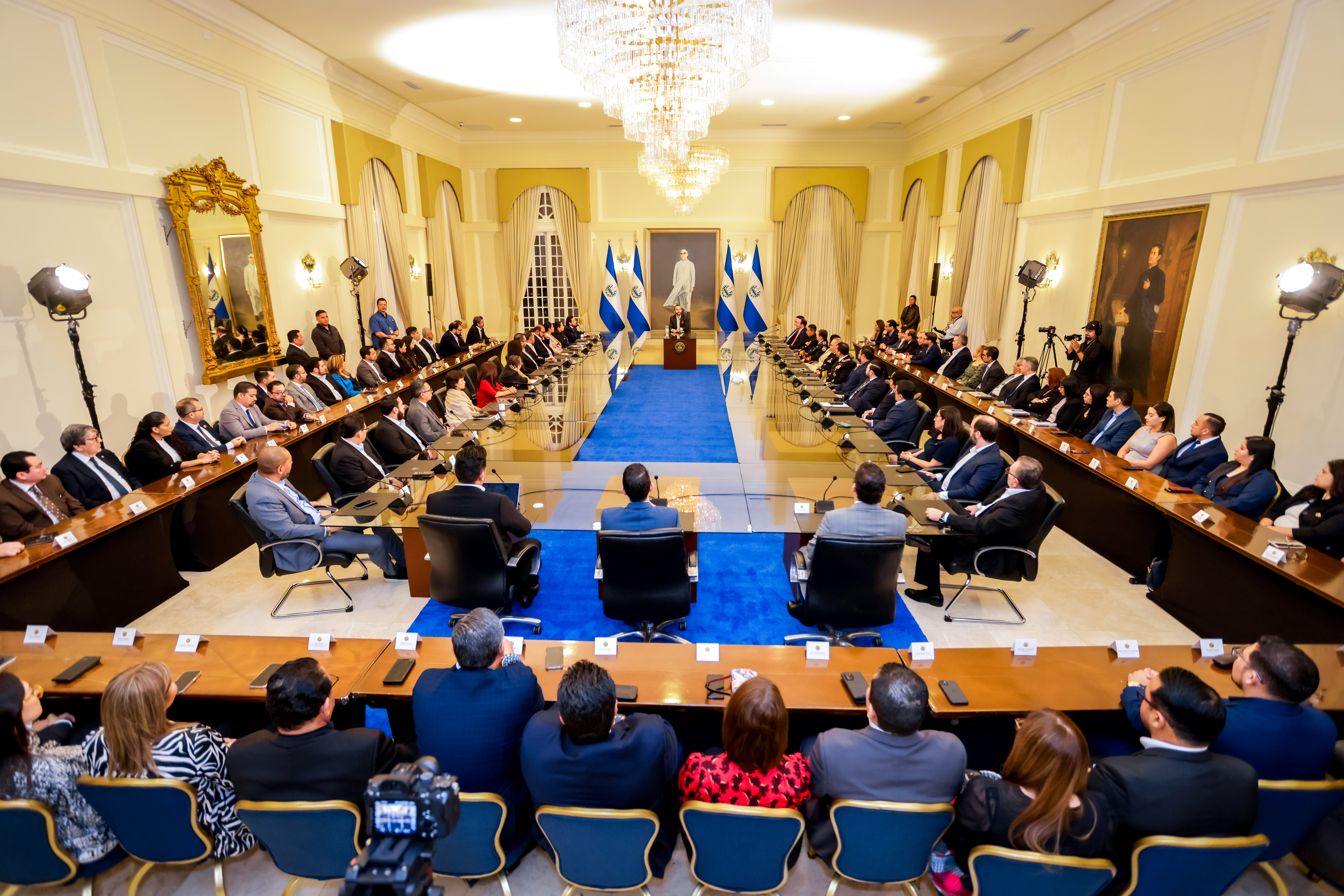
- Nayib Bukele heading a cabinet meeting, November 2023
- Date formed: 1 June 2019

People and organisations
- President: Nayib Bukele; Claudia Rodríguez (acting) (Note: 1 December 2023 – 1 June 2024)
- Vice President: Félix Ulloa
- No. of ministers: 16
- Ministers removed: 12
- Total no. of members: 28
- Member party: Nuevas Ideas
- Status in legislature: Opposition (2019–2021); Supermajority (2021–present)

History
- Elections: 2019 presidential election 2024 presidential election
- Legislature terms: XII Legislative Assembly; XIII Legislative Assembly; XIV Legislative Assembly
- Predecessor: Salvador Sánchez Cerén

The cabinet of Nayib Bukele formed on 1 June 2019 to serve as President Nayib Bukele's cabinet from 1 June 2019 until 1 June 2029.

== List of cabinet members ==
=== Current cabinet members ===
After Bukele's second inauguration on 1 June 2024, the Salvadoran government announced that all cabinet members would retain their positions until further notice.

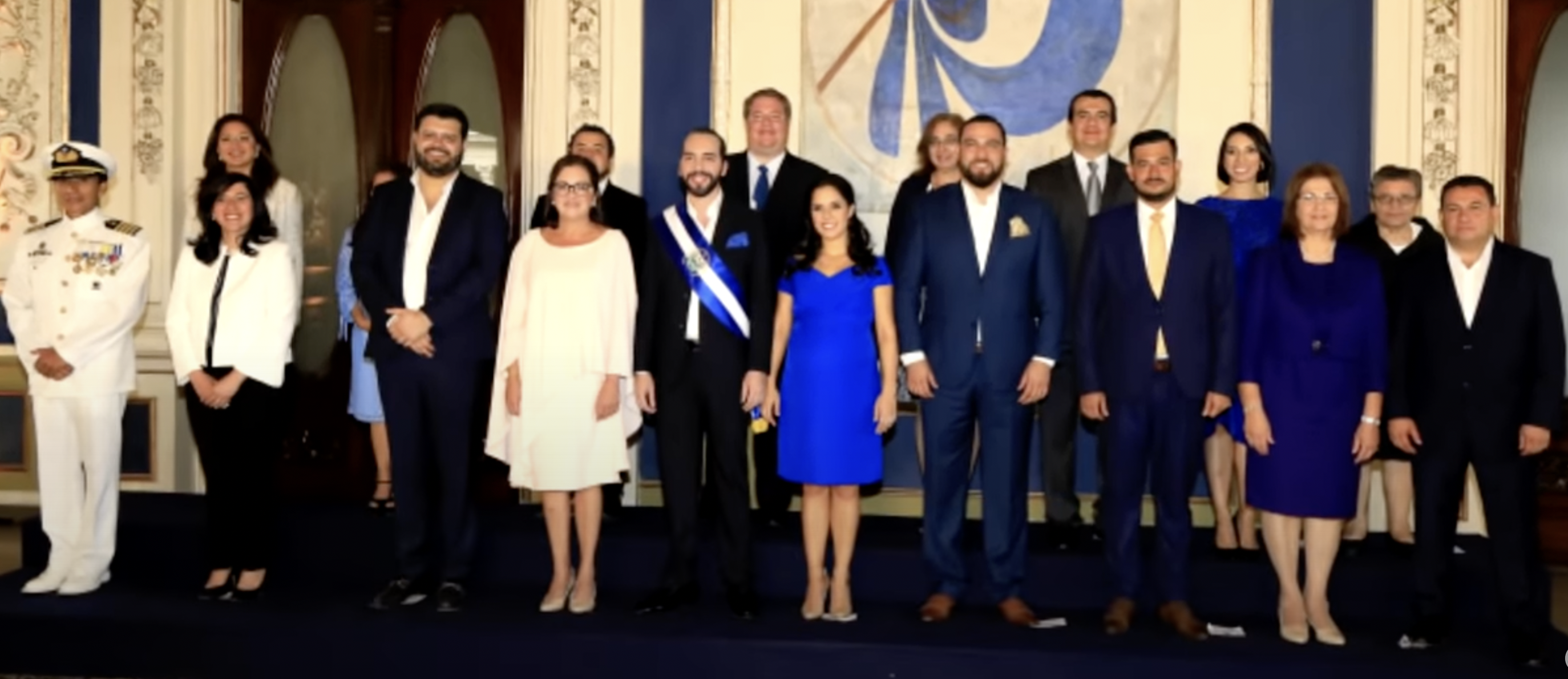
Bukele's cabinet on 1 June 2019

Office	Officeholder		Assumed office	Ref.
Minister of the Interior	Juan Carlos Bidegain Hananía	Juan Carlos Bidegain Hananía	7 April 2021	
Minister of Foreign Affairs	Juana Alexandra Hill Tinoco	Juana Alexandra Hill Tinoco	1 June 2019	
Minister of Justice and Public Security	Héctor Gustavo Villatoro Funes	Héctor Gustavo Villatoro Funes	26 March 2021	
Minister of Finance	Jerson Rogelio Posada Molina	Jerson Rogelio Posada Molina	18 July 2023	
Minister of the Economy	María Luisa Hayem Breve	María Luisa Hayem Breve	1 June 2019	
Minister of Education, Science, and Technology	Karla Edith Trigueros	Karla Edith Trigueros	14 August 2025	
Minister of National Defense	René Francis Merino Monroy	René Francis Merino Monroy	1 June 2019	
Minister of Labor	Óscar Rolando Castro	Óscar Rolando Castro	1 June 2019	
Minister of Agriculture and Livestock	Óscar Enrique Guardado Calderón	Óscar Enrique Guardado Calderón	14 December 2022	
Minister of Health	Francisco José Alabí Montoya	Francisco José Alabí Montoya	27 March 2020	
Minister of Public Works	Édgar Romeo Rodríguez Herrera	Édgar Romeo Rodríguez Herrera	1 June 2019	
Minister of the Environment	Fernando Andrés López Larreynaga	Fernando Andrés López Larreynaga	1 June 2019	
Minister of Tourism	Morena Ileana Valdez Vigil	Morena Ileana Valdez Vigil	1 June 2019	
Minister of Culture	Raúl Neftalí Castillo Rosales	Raúl Neftalí Castillo Rosales	19 June 2024	
Minister of Housing	Irma Michelle Martha Ninette Sol Schweikert	Irma Michelle Martha Ninette Sol Schweikert	1 June 2019	
Minister of Local Development	María Ofelia Navarrete de Dubón	María Ofelia Navarrete de Dubón	1 June 2019	

=== Former cabinet members ===
Office	Officeholder		Assumed office	Left office	Ref.
Minister of Health	Ana del Carmen Orellana Bendek	Ana del Carmen Orellana Bendek	1 June 2019	27 March 2020	
Minister of Finance	Nelson Eduardo Fuentes Menjívar	Nelson Eduardo Fuentes Menjívar	1 June 2019	28 July 2020	
Minister of Culture	Suecy Beverly Callejas Estrada	Suecy Beverly Callejas Estrada	1 June 2019	1 November 2020	
Minister of the Interior and Territorial Development	Mario Edgardo Durán Gavidia	Mario Edgardo Durán Gavidia	1 June 2019	20 November 2020	
Minister of Justice and Public Security	Rogelio Eduardo Rivas Polanco	Rogelio Eduardo Rivas Polanco	1 June 2019	26 March 2021	
Minister of Agriculture and Livestock	Pablo Salvador Anliker Infante	Pablo Salvador Anliker Infante	1 June 2019	7 April 2021	
Minister of Education, Science, and Technology	Carla Evelyn Hananía de Varela	Carla Evelyn Hananía de Varela	1 June 2019	22 February 2022	
Minister of Agriculture and Livestock	David Josué Martínez Panameño	David Josué Martínez Panameño	7 April 2021	9 March 2022	
Minister of Agriculture and Livestock	Enrique José Arturo Parada Rivas	Enrique José Arturo Parada Rivas	9 March 2022	14 December 2022	
Minister of Finance	José Alejandro Zelaya Villalobo	José Alejandro Zelaya Villalobo	28 July 2020	18 July 2023	
Minister of Culture	Mariemm Eunice Pleitez Quiñónez	Mariemm Eunice Pleitez Quiñónez	30 July 2021	19 June 2024	
Minister of Education, Science, and Technology	José Mauricio Pineda Rodríguez	José Mauricio Pineda Rodríguez	22 February 2022	14 August 2025	
