= Alejandro Muyshondt =

Salvadoran politician (1977–2024)

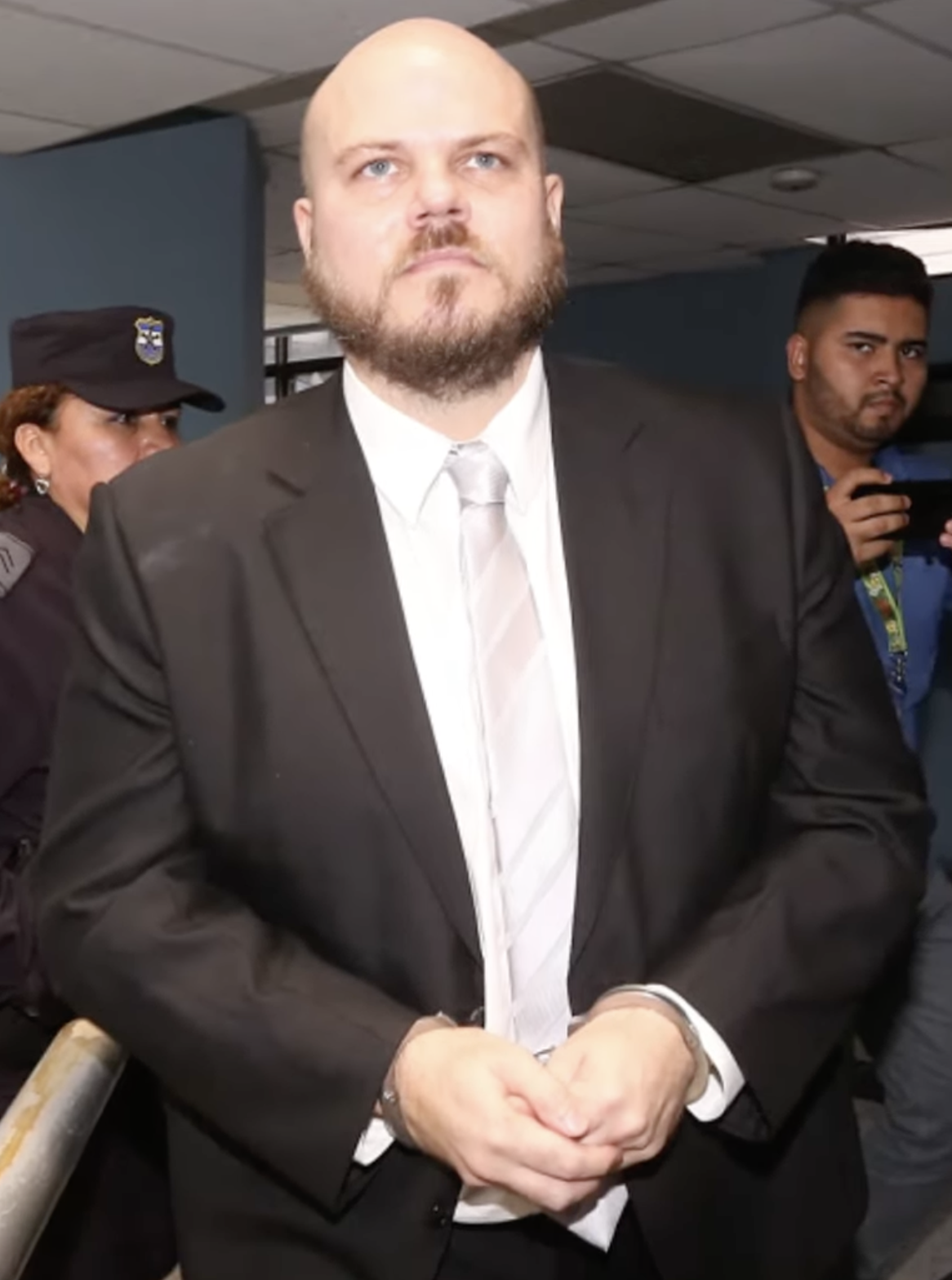
- Muyshondt during his 2019 arrest

National Security Advisor of El Salvador
- In office 1 June 2019 – 9 August 2023
- President: Nayib Bukele

Personal details
- Born: Jorge Alejandro Muyshondt Álvarez; 12 February 1977 El Salvador
- Died: 7 February 2024 (aged 46) San Salvador, El Salvador
- Cause of death: Pulmonary edema
- Party: Nationalist Republican Alliance (until 2013); Unity Movement (2013–2014); Grand Alliance for National Unity (2015); Salvadoran Democracy (2015)
- Parent: Patricia Álvarez (mother)
- Relatives: Ernesto Muyshondt (cousin)
- Education: University of Angers
- Occupation: Politician

Jorge Alejandro Muyshondt Álvarez (12 February 1977 – 7 February 2024) was a Salvadoran politician who served as a national security advisor to Salvadoran President Nayib Bukele from 2019 to 2023. Muyshondt previously served as Bukele's security advisor from 2017 to 2019 while Bukele was mayor of San Salvador.

In July 2023, Muyshondt alleged that Nuevas Ideas deputy Erick García was involved in MS-13 drug trafficking operations ultimately resulting in García's arrest and expulsion from the Legislative Assembly. On 9 August 2023, Muyshondt was arrested by the National Civil Police and was accused by Bukele of being a double agent for former Salvadoran President Mauricio Funes. Muyshondt was admitted to the Hospital Saldaña in October 2023 after suffering a stroke and died in custody in February 2024. His family alleges that he "was silenced" and tortured by the government.

== Early life ==
Jorge Alejandro Muyshondt Álvarez was born in El Salvador on 12 February 1977. His mother was Patricia Álvarez. Muyshondt spoke Spanish, English, and French.

== Early career ==
In 2003, Muyshondt received his bachelor's degree in criminology from the University of Angers in France. In 2008, he founded CENTCOM Intelligence and Counter-Intelligence Services.

Muyshondt was a member of the Nationalist Republican Alliance until 2013. During the 2014 presidential election, Muyshondt supported Unity Movement candidate and former President Antonio Saca. During the 2015 legislative election, Muyshondt stood for election as a Grand Alliance for National Unity candidate to be a deputy in the Legislative Assembly, however, he later withdrew and stood for election as Salvadoran Democracy's candidate for mayor of Mejicanos. Muyshondt came in 5th place, winning 2.06 percent of the vote accounting for 1,243 votes; Farabundo Martí National Liberation Front candidate Simón Paz was elected mayor of Mejicanos.

From January 2017 to May 2019, Muyshondt served as a security advisor for Nayib Bukele, the mayor of San Salvador from 2015 to 2018. Bukele had succeeded Muyshondt's cousin, Ernesto Muyshondt, as mayor of San Salvador. According to Muyshondt's family, he and Bukele had been friends since adolescence. In 2017, Muyshondt received US$14,125 from the office of the mayor of San Salvador for his audiovisual production service for the Municipal Youth Institute between April and June 2017.

== National security advisor ==
Muyshondt was personally invited by Bukele to attend his inauguration as president of El Salvador on 1 June 2019. Muyshondt became Bukele's national security advisor. In May 2021, Muyshondt, Bukele's brothers Yusef and Ibrajim, and other Salvadoran officials attended an online meeting to discuss potentially making cryptocurrency legal tender in El Salvador; the meeting came a week before the Legislative Assembly passed the Bitcoin Law which made bitcoin legal tender.

On 27 July 2023, Muyshondt alleged that Erick García, a deputy of the Legislative Assembly from Nuevas Ideas, was involved in MS-13 drug trafficking operations. He posted images on X allegedly depicting García's staffers displaying MS-13 gang signs and screenshots allegedly depicting García's WhatsApp messages which included images of packaged marijuana. García denied Muyshondt's allegations. Bukele ordered Muyshondt to hand over the conversations to the office of the attorney general for an investigation. On 31 July, Nuevas Ideas launched an investigation into Muyshondt's allegations resulting in his expulsion from the party and the Legislative Assembly. García and his supplement deputy, Nidia Turcios, were arrested by the National Civil Police on 17 August. After Muyshondt's own arrest in August 2023, Bukele stated that Muyshondt only published the allegations against García in order to distract an investigation against himself.

== Legal troubles ==
In November 2013, Muyshondt attempted to search for a thief who allegedly stole someone's phone in San Salvador. He was armed with an AK-47 and a 9 mm pistol while wearing a mask and a bulletproof vest. He stated that the reason he did it was because both the National Civil Police and the office of the attorney general were ineffective. In November 2014, Muyshondt was arrested after he had allegedly threatened a public transportation driver with a firearm. He was later released after he reconciled with the driver.

In August 2016, Muyshondt was charged with defamation. He was accused of defaming Inversiones Roble S.A. de C.V. and Grupo Roble de Panamá by publishing some of the companies' employees names on Twitter and attempting to connect them to the Panama Papers scandal. He refused to settle the case. He was acquitted on 25 September 2017 by San Salvador's 1st Criminal Court, however, on 20 August 2018, the Criminal Chamber of the Supreme Court of Justice of El Salvador ordered a retrial.

On 6 September 2019, Muyshondt and his bodyguard, Manuel Calles, were arrested after two women accused them of verbally attacking them and causing damage to their vehicle. On 9 September, the office of the attorney general charged them with six crimes related to the incident, but also granted them release from detention. Following Muyshondt's arrest, Rogelio Rivas, the minister of justice and public security, stated that Muyshondt should be removed as national security advisor. On 11 September, Muyshondt and Calles settled with the two women and paid a US$2,500 fine each, however, the office of the attorney general pursued a charge of resisting arrest. On 4 February 2020, San Salvador's 3rd Instruction Court suspended all criminal proceedings related to the September 2019 incident.

=== 2023 arrest ===
On 3 August 2023, allegations surfaced that Muyshondt had been secretly working as an informant for Mauricio Funes, a former president of El Salvador who had been living in exile in Nicaragua since 2016 and who was wanted on embezzlement charges. Funes denied the allegations and stated that he and Muyshondt did not have any personal relationship.

On 9 August 2023, the National Civil Police arrested Muyshondt. In a post on X, Bukele stated that Muyshondt had been charged for several crimes, including allegedly "assisting the evasion and revealing secret documents" ("favorecer la evasión y revelación de documentos secretos") to help Funes evade capture. Bukele also claimed that Muyshondt had been working as a double agent since 2019. The office of the attorney general appointed three lawyers to Muyshondt, and his family claimed that they were not allowed to hire their own lawyer, which they described as a "farce" ("farsa"). Muyshondt's family alleged that, upon receiving the clothes he was wearing on the day of his arrest, they noticed that it was stained with blood, leading them believe that he could have been tortured. On 23 August, San Salvador's 6th Organized Crime Court ordered Muyshondt to be held in preventive detention for six months and denied granting his family information regarding his whereabouts. Sonia Rubio, a lawyer for the Foundation for Due Process, argued that the government withholding information about Muyshondt's whereabouts from his family would constitute a forced disappearance.

== Illness and death ==
On 16 October 2023, the Ministry of Health stated that Muyshondt was admitted to the Hospital Saldaña in San Salvador to receive medical attention after suffering an ischemic stroke which held him unable to walk or speak. Muyshondt's family claimed that they only learned about his condition after reading a news article published by El Diario de Hoy. Muyshondt's mother stated that she believed he had suffered the stroke due to her not being able to provide him medication which he took. She also petitioned First Lady Gabriela Rodríguez de Bukele to allow her to see her son. On 31 October, the office of the attorney general denied rumors that Muyshondt had died and published a video the following day showing that he was still alive. On 3 November, Fernán Álvarez, one of Muyshondt's lawyers, stated that Muyshondt's family had petitioned the Constitutional Chamber of the Supreme Court of Justice to invoke habeas corpus regarding Muyshondt's detention and asked for a physical and mental evaluation to be performed regarding his health.

Muyshondt died at the Hospital Saldaña on 7 February 2024 at 8:10 p.m. The hospital preliminarily ruled his cause of death as pulmonary edema. He was 46. Muyshondt's family retrieved his remains from Medicina Legal the following day. Muyshondt's mother claimed that the body was bruised, had several holes in it, and that it appeared that a lobotomy had been performed on him. She also claimed that he had been tortured and that he "was silenced in the same manner of Klaus Barbie during the Nazi times, causing harm to his health" ("lo silenciaron a la manera de Klaus Barbie del tiempo Nazi, haciéndolo vejámenes en su salud"). On 11 February, Lucrecia Landaverde, one of Muyshondt's lawyers, stated that she had obtained Muyshondt's medical reports regarding his treatment at the Hospital Saldaña. Both Landaverde and Muyshondt's mother have claimed that Muyshondt didn't die on 7 February, but that he had instead died 48 hours earlier, and Landaverde accused Muyshondt's death of having been a homicide. Landaverde also claimed that authorities had removed Muyshondt's brain and other major organs before returning his body to his family allegedly in order to conceal signs of torture.

Muyshondt's funeral was held in Santa Elena on 12 February 2024 on what would have been his 47th birthday. His family stated that his remains would be cremated. Luis Parada, Nuestro Tiempo's presidential candidate during the 2024 presidential election, attended the funeral because he was a family friend; he stated that "I never knew him, but it appeared to me that this is a clear premeditated assassination by the regime against Alejandro Muyshondt for what he knew and for starting to speak about the corruption against and within government officials" ("a él nunca lo conocí, pero me parece que esto es claramente un asesinato premeditado del régimen contra Alejandro Muyshondt por razones de lo que él sabía y que empezaba a decir de la corrupción contra y dentro de funcionarios a fines al Gobierno"). Juan Pappier, the sub-director for the Americas of Human Rights Watch posted on X stating that a "serious and independent" ("seria e independiente") investigation into Muyshondt's death must be conducted.

== See also ==
- Cabinet of Nayib Bukele
