= Louis Dubois =

Louis Dubois may refer to:

- Louis Du Bois (Huguenot) (died 1696), Huguenot colonist in New Netherland
- Louis Dubois (painter) (1830–1880), Belgian painter
- Louis Dubois (politician) (1859–1946), French politician
- Louis-Ernest Dubois (1856–1929), Roman Catholic cardinal and Archbishop of Paris
- Louis Victor Dubois (1837–1914), French politician
- Luis Dubois (1510–1570s), Spanish colonial administrator
- Lewis DuBois (1744–1824), American Revolutionary War commander
