= Tigre Club =

Museum in Tigre, Buenos Aires, Argentina

Coordinates: 34°24′34″S 58°35′28″W

Tigre Art Museum "Intendant Ricardo Ubieto"
- Museo de Arte de Tigre "Intendente Ricardo Ubieto"

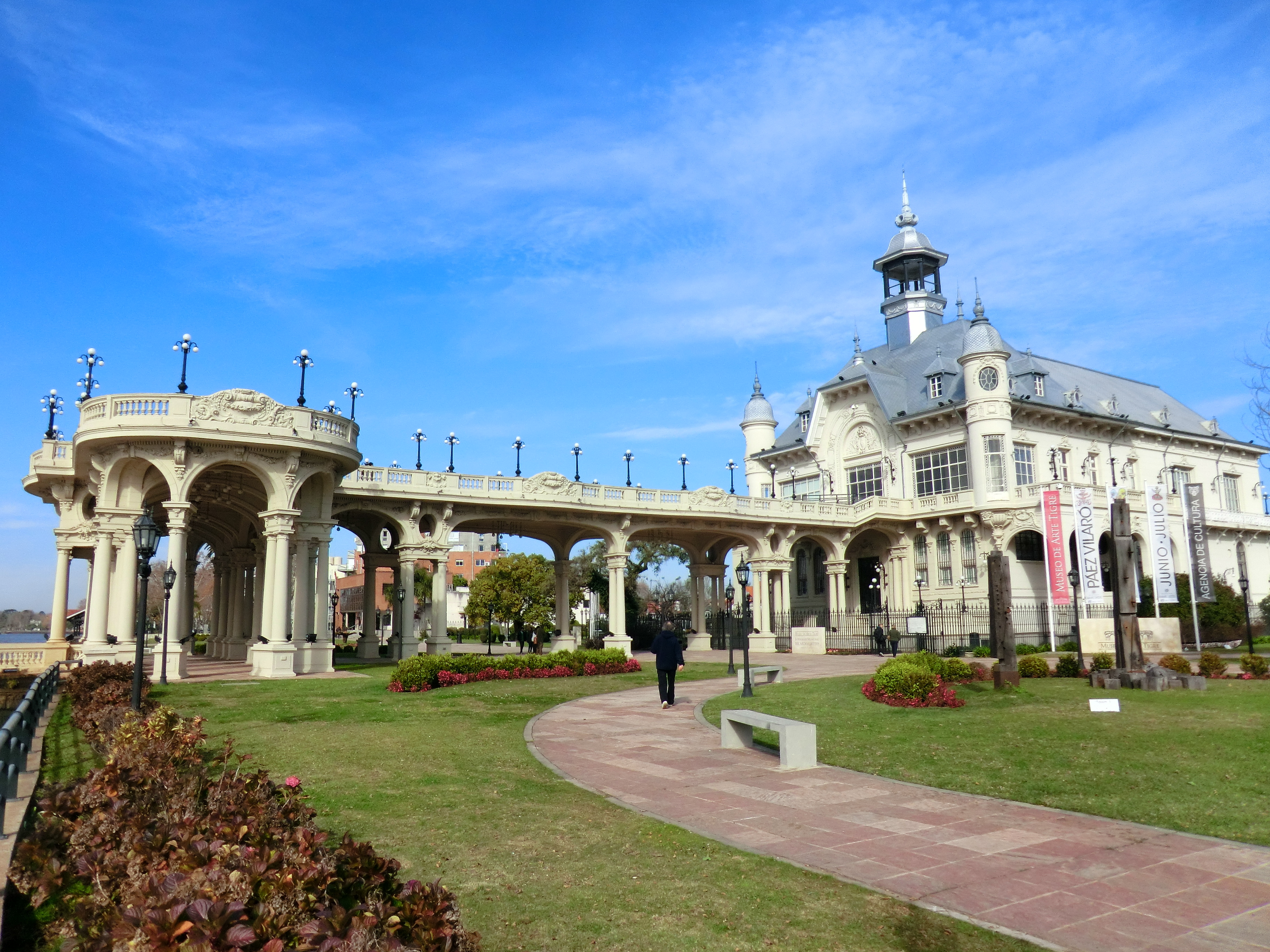
- The museum in 2013
- Established: 1912; 114 years ago (club); 2006 (museum)
- Location: Paseo Victorica 972; Tigre, Argentina
- Type: Social club Art museum (2006–present)
- Architects: Paul Eugéne Pater; Luis Dubois
- Owner: Municipality of Tigre
- Website: mat.gov.ar

National Historic Monument of Argentina
- Designated: 1979

The Tigre Art Museum Intendant Ricardo Ubieto (Spanish: Museo de Arte de Tigre "Intendente Ricardo Ubieto), formerly the Tigre Club, is an art museum stands on the banks of the Luján River, in Paseo Victorica, Tigre, Argentina.

The museum is named after es:Ricardo Ubieto (1933–2006),mayor of Tigre Partido between 1979–1983, and 1987–2006.

== History ==
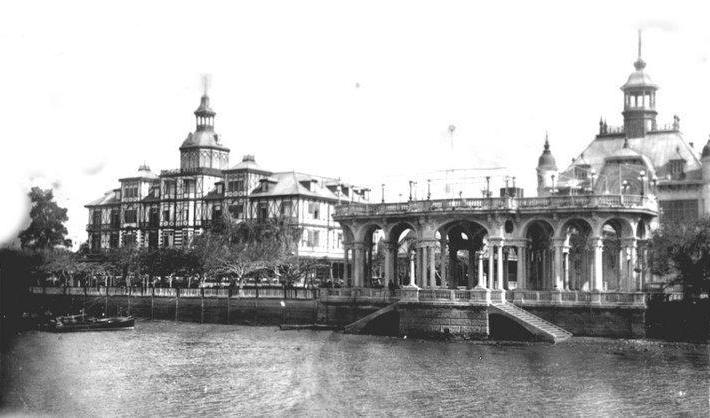
Tigre Hotel (left) and Tigre Club c. 1910. The hotel was demolished in mid 1930s

The club's building, built next to the Tigre Hotel (demolished in 1942), was financed by Ernesto Tornquist and was designed by French architects Paul Eugéne Pater and Luis Dubois. It was opened on 13 January 1912.

Opened shortly after an adjacent hotel established in 1890, the Tigre Club served as a social venue for the rich and famous. The two-story building features mezzanines and large windows on most facades. Its primary first-floor salon contains frescoes painted by Spanish artist Julio Vila y Prades (1875–1930), while the interior features marble staircases, Venetian mirrors, and French chandeliers.

A casino operated there from 1927 until 1933, when it was transferred to Mar del Plata after a law was passed prohibiting the existence of a casino so close to Buenos Aires. The closing of the casino and the international crisis brought about a considerable loss of visitors. After Tigre Hotel was destroyed by fire in the 1930s and finally demolished in 1942, Tigre Club continued to function as a restaurant with live shows but it never recovered its former glory.

In 1979 the Tigre Club was declared a National Historic Monument. After extensive restoration it now houses the Tigre Municipal Museum of Fine Art (Museo de Arte Tigre), opened in 2006. The museum houses an extensive collection of Argentine art.

== Building style ==
The building is distinguished by its prominent roofline, featuring corner turrets, a small observation tower, and zinc cresting with pinnacles; its broken-pitch roof slopes blend the classic French mansard style with the Picturesque aesthetic—a style typical of the grand estates and seaside resorts of the era, such as those in Mar del Plata. The lavish interior décor incorporates marble, cast-iron sculptures from the Val d’Osne foundry, Venetian mirrors, Baccarat crystal chandeliers, stained glass, and bronze accents, as well as a dome featuring a *marouflage* painting by the Valencian artist Julio Vila-Prades.

The social building connects to the Luján River via a dramatic T-shaped pier-pavilion with rounded ends; its expansive raised terrace features a sinuous balustrade lined with lampposts, while the lower, gallery-lined walkway—supported by paired columns and arches—integrates seamlessly with the Paseo Victorica gardens and the natural landscape of the Delta.

== Gallery ==
Front view

Gallery

Interior room

South gallery

Garden

Fresco

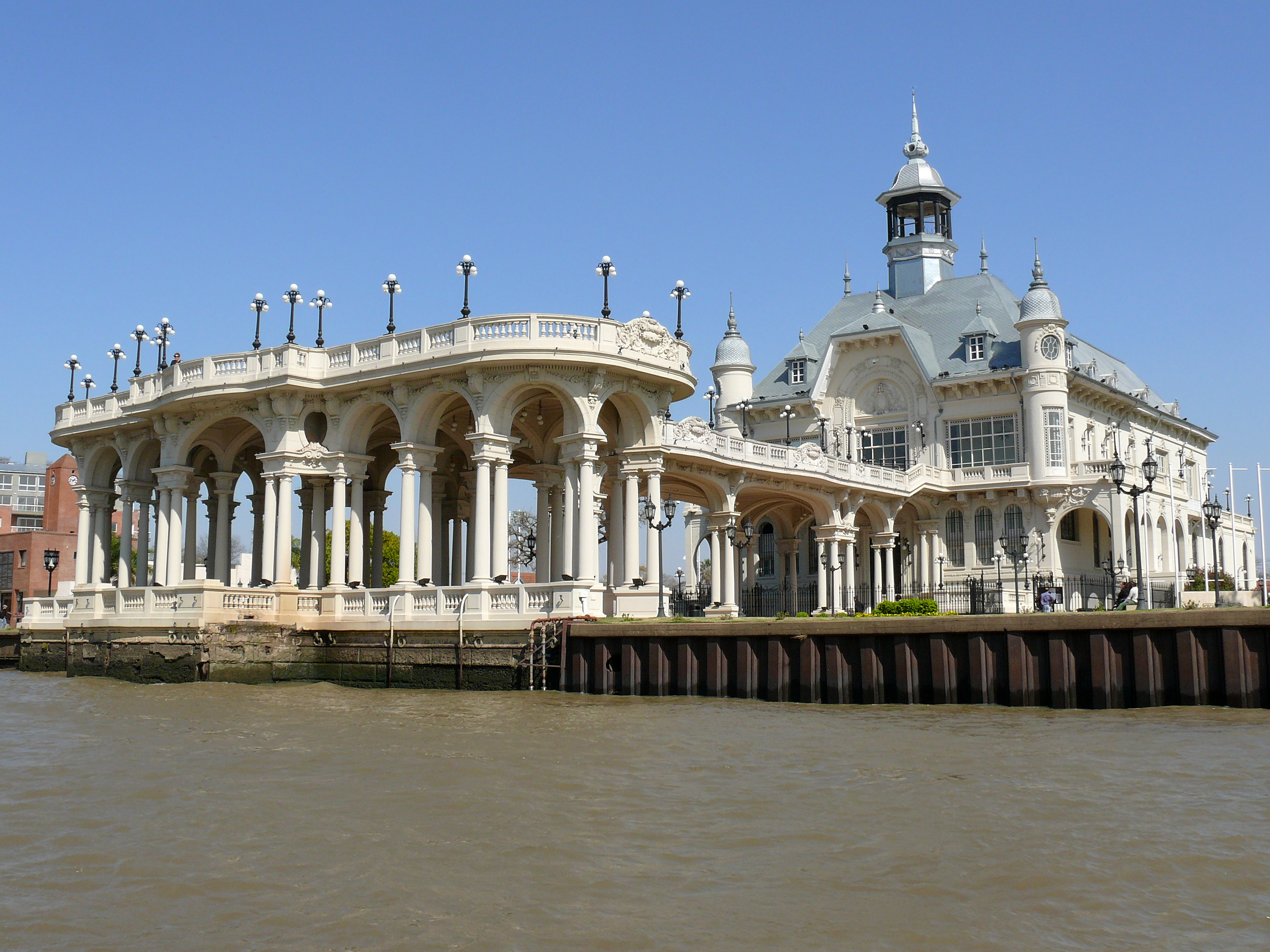
Museum and river

Tower

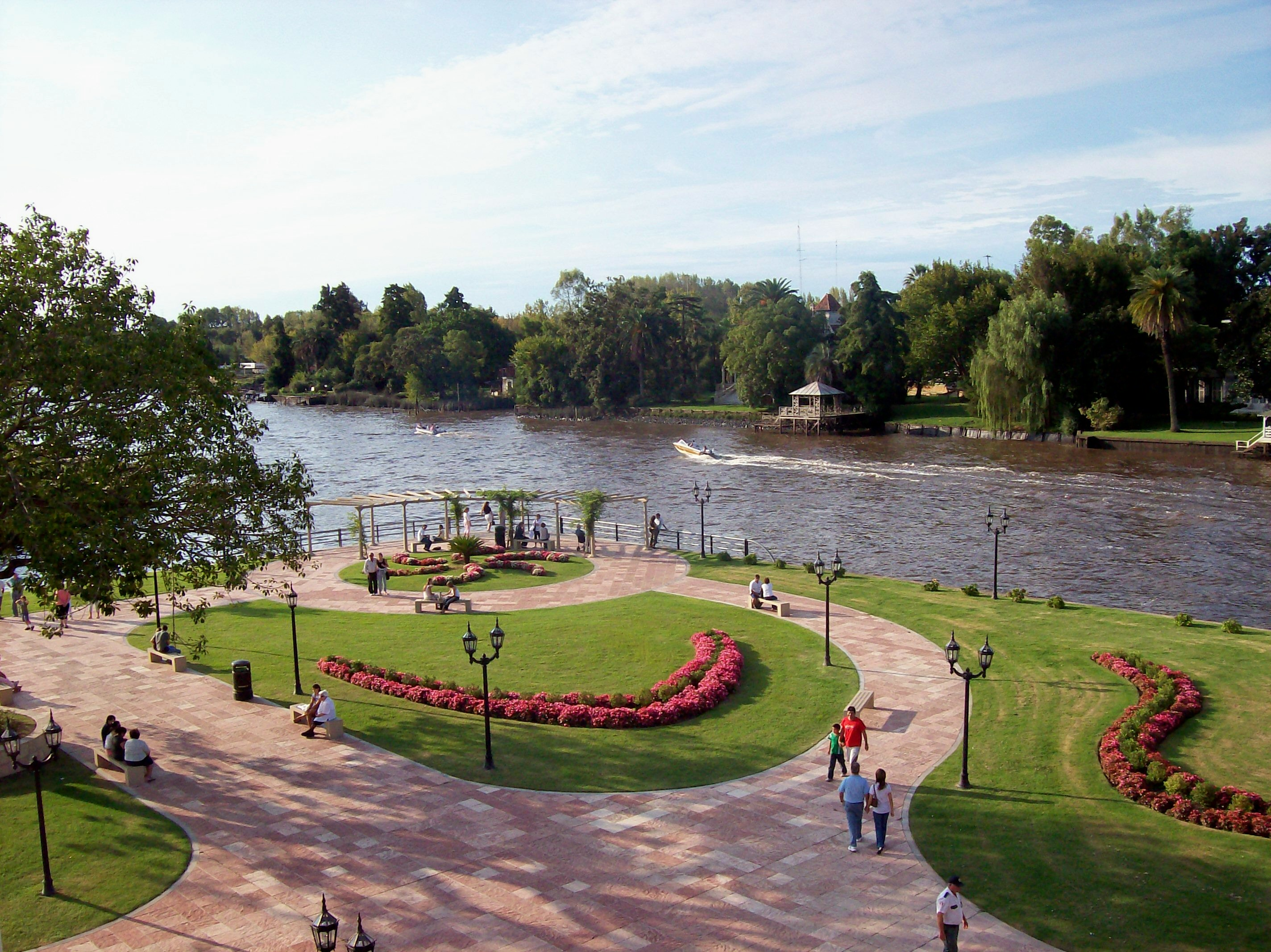
Park and river

Columns

Sign

Interior

Lantern
