= Mario Durán =

Salvadoran politician

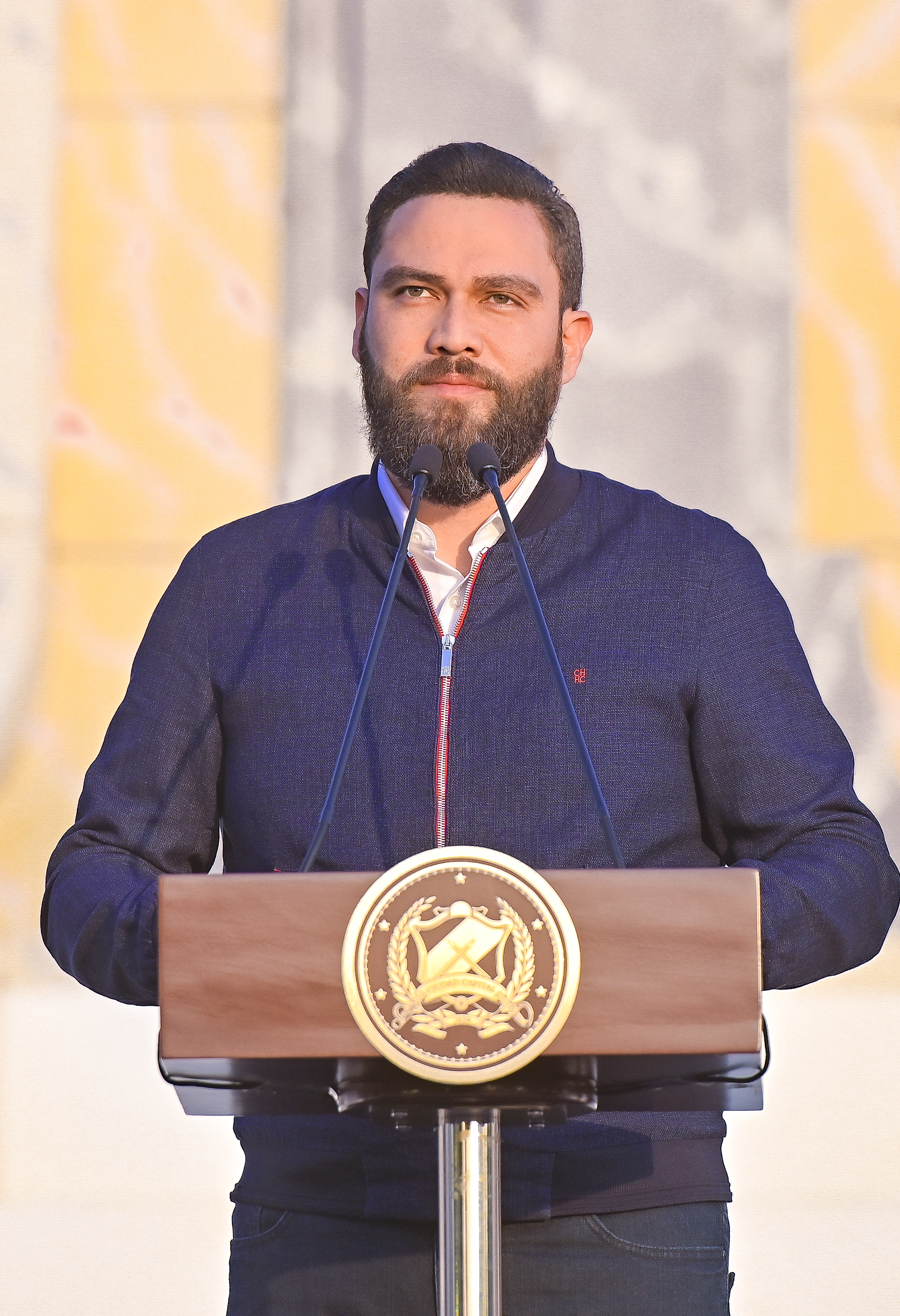

1st Mayor of San Salvador Centro
- Incumbent
- Assumed office 1 May 2024
- Preceded by: Himself (as mayor of San Salvador)

127th Mayor of San Salvador
- In office 1 May 2021 – 1 May 2024
- Preceded by: Ernesto Muyshondt
- Succeeded by: Himself (as mayor of San Salvador Centro)

Minister of the Interior
- In office 1 July 2019 – 30 November 2020
- President: Nayib Bukele
- Preceded by: Ana Daysi Villalobos
- Succeeded by: Juan Carlos Bidegain

Personal details
- Born: 3 April 1983 (age 43) San Salvador, El Salvador
- Party: Nuevas Ideas
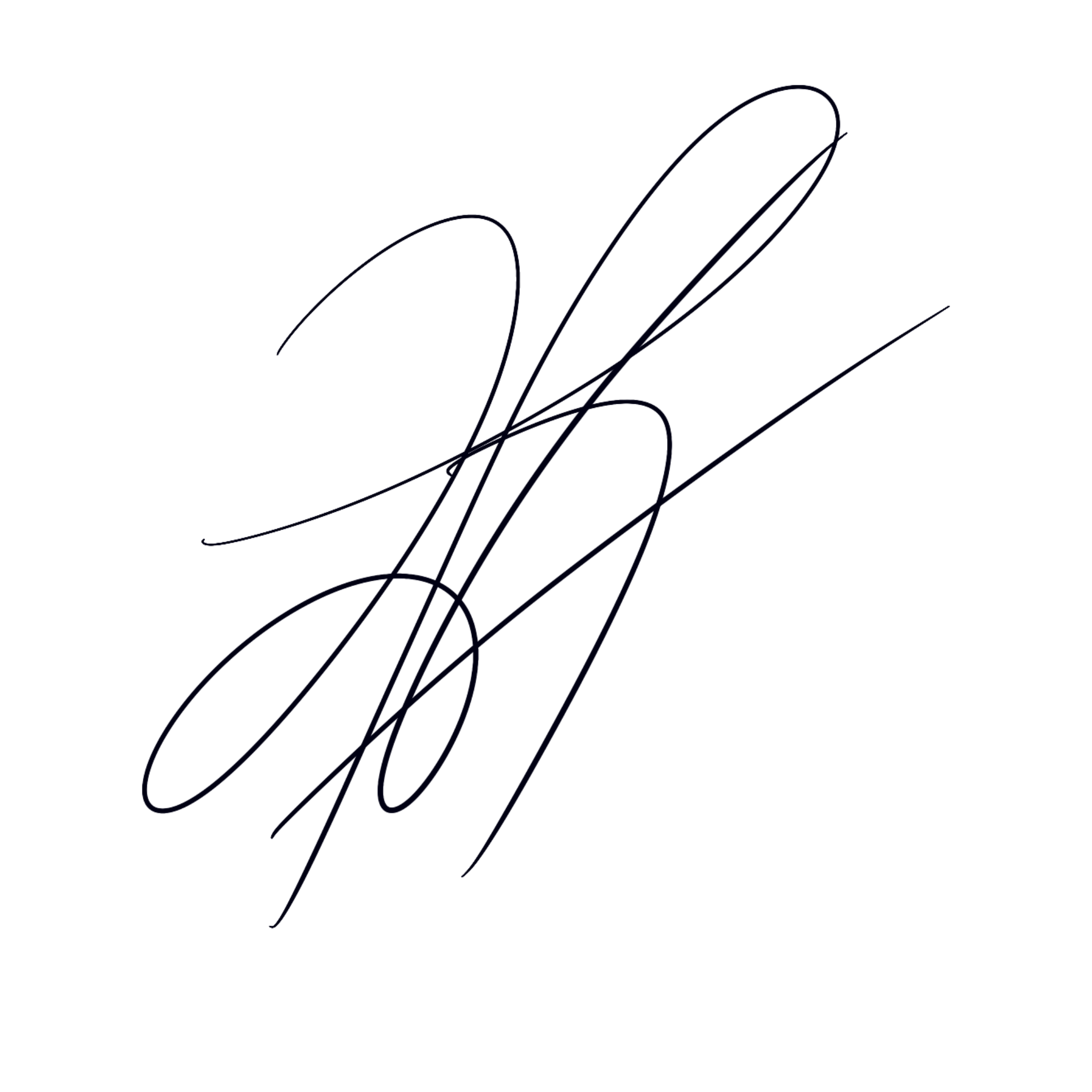
- Signature

Mario Edgardo Durán Gavidia (born 3 April 1983) is a Salvadoran politician and businessman. He has worked in public administration since 2012, he was Minister of the Interior in the Cabinet of President Nayib Bukele, and since 1 May 2021 he has been mayor of San Salvador.

== Career ==
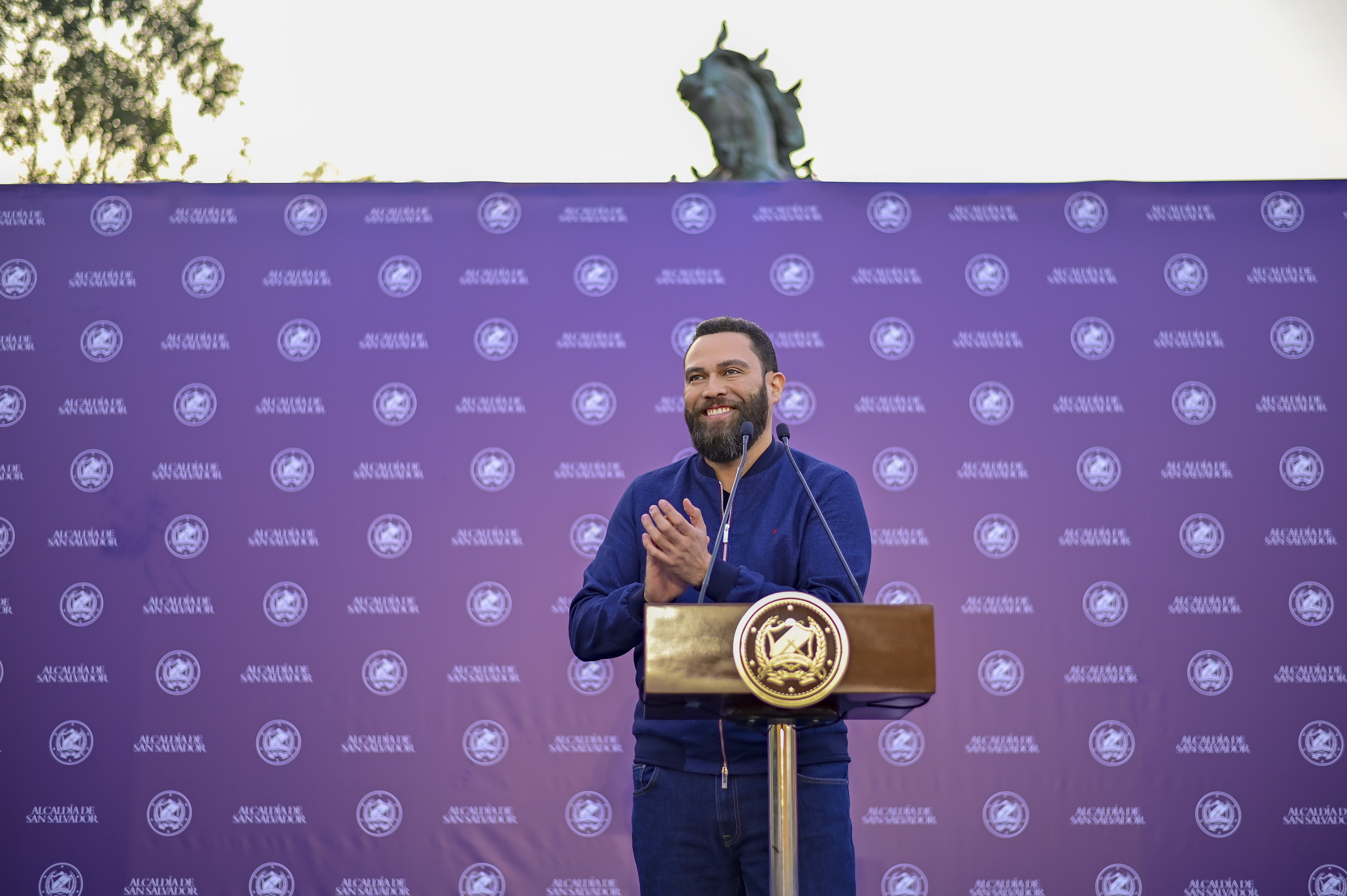
Mayor Mario Durán during the event in the historic center of the capital.

In 2019, Mario Durán was selected by President Nayib Bukele, as Minister of the Interior and Territorial Development, in addition to being appointed President of the National Civil Protection Commission. As part of his administration, Mario Durán led the central government's response to the most serious environmental and health crises in the country, such as tropical storms, the Nejapa landslide and the COVID-19 emergency in El Salvador.

In 2020 Mario Durán made the decision to run as a pre-candidate for mayor for San Salvador, obtaining an absolute majority in the internal elections of Nuevas Ideas (NI).

On 28 February 2021, in the legislative elections, he became the winner of the Mayor's Office of San Salvador, defeating Ernesto Muyshondt, who was seeking re-election under the banner of the Nationalist Republican Alliance (ARENA).

On 9 December 2022, he announced he would be seeking a second term as mayor of San Salvador in 2024. Durán was elected as mayor of San Salvador Centro. Durán is seeking a third term.

Political offices
Preceded by Ernesto Muyshondt	Mayor of San Salvador; 2021–present	Incumbent
