= Ernesto Muyshondt =

Salvadoran politician (born 1975)

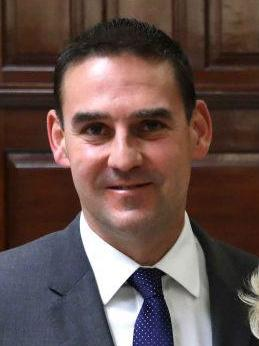
- Muyshondt in 2018

126th Mayor of San Salvador
- In office 1 May 2018 – 1 May 2021
- Preceded by: Nayib Bukele
- Succeeded by: Mario Durán

Deputy of the Legislative Assembly of El Salvador from San Salvador
- In office 1 May 2015 – 1 May 2018

Personal details
- Born: Ernesto Luis Muyshondt García Prieto; 30 August 1975 (age 51) San Salvador, El Salvador
- Party: Nationalist Republican Alliance
- Spouse: Karla Belismelis de Muyshondt
- Relatives: Alejandro Muyshondt (cousin)
- Education: José Matías Delgado University
- Occupation: Businessman, politician
- Criminal information
- Convictions: Illicit association Electoral fraud
- Penalty: 18 years imprisonment

Ernesto Luis Muyshondt García Prieto (born 30 August 1975) is a Salvadoran businessman and politician. He served as the mayor of San Salvador, the capital and largest city in El Salvador, from 2018 to 2021 as a member of the Nationalist Republican Alliance (ARENA). He was previously a deputy of the Legislative Assembly of El Salvador from 2015 until 2018. Muyshondt was convicted on 30 September 2025 of illicit association and electoral fraud committed in 2014 and 2015. He was sentenced to 18 years imprisonment.

== Biography ==
In 2014, the presidential candidate for ARENA, Norman Quijano, and Ernesto Muyshondt met with leaders of Mara Salvatrucha 13 and the two factions of Barrio 18 on different occasions. They negotiated the support of criminal groups in exchange for a series of promises, such as the abolition of the anti-gang law and the reduction of police operations against gangs.

In 2017, incumbent San Salvador Mayor Nayib Bukele was expelled from the Farabundo Martí National Liberation Front (FMLN) party. In response, Bukele announced that he would seek a new political party and run for president in the 2019 Salvadoran presidential election. The political upheaval came less than six months before the 2018 Salvadoran municipal elections, when voters would choose a new Mayor of San Salvador.

The right-wing Nationalist Republican Alliance (ARENA) selected Ernesto Muyshondt, a deputy in the Legislative Assembly, as its candidate. The ruling FMLN, which had held the mayor's office until it expelled Bukele from the party, chose Jackeline Rivera, a National Assembly deputy from Cuscatlán and former child soldier during the Salvadoran Civil War, as its candidate for mayor. Observers believed that Muyshondt had the edge in the race. Muyshondt easily defeated Rivera in the mayoral election on 4 March 2018. Muyshondt received 88,194 votes, or 61.2%, while Rivera placed a distant second with 39,736 votes, or 27.61%.

Muyshondt was inaugurated as Mayor of San Salvador on 1 May 2018.

The alliance between Ernesto Muyshondt and Nayib Bukele was fruitful. When he took office, Muyshondt kept two people from Bukele's inner circle in their positions, Suecy Callejas and Yamil Bukele, who would later become key officials in the presidency. The alliance also allowed Bukele's people to cover up some of the expenses he incurred as mayor for his own political purposes, such as the production of propaganda and municipal material.

In 2021, the Secretary General of the OAS, Luis Almagro, announced that he would appoint Ernesto Muyshondt as an advisor on security issues.

In the legislative elections, held in February 2021, Muyshondt lost re-election for the Mayor of San Salvador against the candidate of Nuevas Ideas, Mario Durán. On 4 June 2021, after breaking his political alliance with Nayib Bukele, he was placed under house arrest on suspicions of electoral fraud and illicit association with gangs. His cousin Alejandro Muyshondts, who was also an advisor to President Bukele, was also arrested. The latter died in 2024 while in custody. He was hospitalized in January 2023 following a "prolonged hunger strike".

Muyshondt was convicted on 30 September 2025 of illicit association and electoral fraud committed in 2014 and 2015. He was sentenced to 18 years imprisonment.

Political offices
Preceded by Nayib Bukele	Mayor of San Salvador; 2018–2021	Succeeded by Mario Durán
