= Ministry of the Interior (El Salvador) =

Government ministry of El Salvador

Ministry of the Interior and Territorial Development
- Ministerio de Gobernación y Desarrollo Territorial
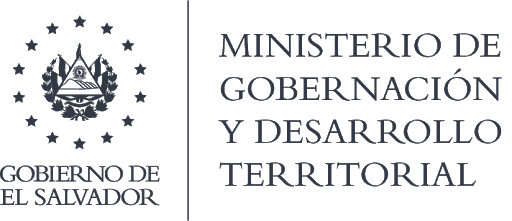

Agency overview
- Jurisdiction: El Salvador
- Headquarters: 9 Calle Poniente and 15 Av. Norte, Government Center, San Salvador.
- Minister responsible: Juan Carlos Bidegain Hananía
- Website: https://www.gobernacion.gob.sv/

The Ministry of Governance and Territorial Development (Spanish: Ministerio de Gobernación y Desarrollo Territorial) of El Salvador is a state institution whose mission is to "guarantee governance and provide services for the benefit of the population through preventive actions and participatory organization, integrating institutional efforts to improve the quality of life of all people".

== History ==
Throughout its historical development, the Ministry of the Interior has undergone several modifications in both its name and responsibilities. An example of this dates back to October 1, 1915, when the Constitutional President of the Republic, Don Carlos Meléndez, in the Council of Ministers, promulgated the Internal Regulations of the Executive Branch, which established 10 ministries then called Secretariats of State. These included Foreign Affairs, the Interior, Finance and Public Credit, War, Public Instruction, Justice, Development, Agriculture, Welfare, and the Navy. The Secretariat of the Interior, formerly known as the Ministry of the Interior since 1897 according to the Budget Law, incorporated at that time the areas of National Defense and Public Security, encompassing the relations of the Executive Branch with the municipalities, among other responsibilities specified in the regulatory framework.

Subsequently, through Decree No. 41 of May 5, 1976, a new Internal Regulation of the Executive Branch was established, which led to the creation of three new ministries, including the Ministry of the Presidency, the Ministry of Justice, and the Ministry of Planning and Coordination of Development and Social Affairs. This raised the total number of ministries or secretariats of state to 13, maintaining the presence of the Ministry of the Interior, now designated as the Ministry of the Interior, which was assigned 11 powers:

- Political and administrative organization;
- Administration of the National Printing Office and Official Gazette, Official Publications;
- Expropriation for reasons of public utility;
- Approval of statutes and recognition of legal persons, in accordance with articles 543 and 558 of the Civil Code, when this power is not conferred on another authority by this Regulation or special laws;
- Contentious-administrative matters, which according to the law fall within its competence;
- Migration. Naturalization of foreigners, recognition of Salvadoran nationality by birth and recovery of this status;
- Licenses to Salvadorans to accept jobs or public positions that are not to be granted by the Legislative Assembly in accordance with No. 30 of Art. 47 of the Political Constitution;
- Postal and telecommunications services, control of radio and television stations;
- Public Morality and Entertainment: Legal Censorship, Control and Surveillance of Public Shows;
- The relationship of the Executive Branch with the municipalities, ensuring that they manage their resources for the benefit of the community; for this purpose, it will supervise and control the investment in municipal physical works, and other activities determined by law;
- Other powers as established by law or regulation.

Later, through Decree No. 24 of April 18, 1989, a new Internal Regulation of the Executive Branch was established. This regulation led to the elimination of the Ministry of Planning and Coordination of Development and Social Affairs, leaving a total of 12 ministries in operation, including the Ministry of the Interior.

Decree No. 49 of May 27, 1994, published in the Official Gazette No. 101 of July 1, 1994, established the creation of the Vice Ministry of Public Security, linked to the Ministry of the Interior and Public Security. It specified that this ministry would be responsible for the National Civil Police, and that the powers of the vice ministry would be defined in the Internal Regulations of the Executive Branch, as stipulated in Decree No. 70.

Decree No. 45 of May 22, 1995, published in Official Gazette No. 92 of the same date, established the creation of the Ministry of Public Security and Justice. The preamble to said decree indicated that the National Civil Police would be under the jurisdiction of this ministry. Furthermore, Decree No. 49 of May 27, 1994, which had previously established the Vice-Ministry of Public Security attached to the Ministry of the Interior and Public Security, was expressly repealed. ]

It is also mentioned that by Decree No. 30 of May 19, 1997, Official Gazette No. 89 of the same date, Articles 28, 46 and 52 of the Internal Regulations of the Executive Branch were modified and Article 45 A was inserted, which contains the powers of the Ministry of Environment and Natural Resources, thus making the number of Ministries 14 at that time.

With Decree No. 62 of December 23, 1999, DD No. 240 of the same date, Article 44 was modified and the name of the Ministry of Public Security was changed, adding "and Justice" with new powers.

It is during this period, as part of the reforms, that the General Directorate of Penal Centers, which belonged to what was the Ministry of Justice, becomes part of what was the Ministry of the Interior at that time.

On December 18, 2001, by Decree No. 124, published in the Official Gazette No. 242 of December 20, 2001, Article 28 was amended. Article 34 and its heading, CREATING THE MINISTRY OF THE INTERIOR, were replaced, and its powers were established. Article 34-A was added. Article 44 was repealed. The new Decree, in its Article 5, states: “When legal or regulatory provisions mention the Ministry of the Interior, or the Ministry of Public Security and Justice, or the Head thereof, it shall be understood to refer to the Ministry of the Interior or its head, respectively, because the Ministry of Security and Justice was merged with the Ministry of the Interior and its powers were absorbed by the newly created Ministry of the Interior as a single Ministry.

By Decree No. 125 of December 5, 2006 the Internal Regulations of the Executive Branch were amended, the Ministry of Public Security and Justice was re-established, officially separating from the Ministry of the Interior in 2007, and new powers were defined for the Ministry of the Interior, which are described in Decree No. 125, Art. 2.

Powers entrusted to the Ministry of the Interior according to Decree No. 125 of December 5, 2006:

- To organize and maintain a system for prevention, guidance, mitigation and response to disasters and emergencies of any nature at the national level.
- To manage and administer the Fire Department of El Salvador.
- To authorize the decrees of the President of the Republic and the executive agreements granting legal personality and assistance to non-profit foundations and associations and to religious institutions in accordance with the law, keeping the registry thereof; as well as authorizing foreign associations and foundations to operate in the country.
- To authorize the operation of Arbitration Centers, in accordance with the respective law and to impose sanctions for violations thereof.
- To manage and administer the National Printing Office and the Official Gazette.
- To manage and administer Radio El Salvador.
- To manage and administer the Government Centers.
- To attend to and coordinate everything related to the national and international postal service of El Salvador.
- Authorize the operation of private cemeteries, in accordance with the law.
- Authorize raffles, drawings and commercial promotions, in accordance with the respective laws.
- Represent the country abroad, in the areas of their competence, in coordination with the corresponding bodies.
- To exercise the other powers and responsibilities established by the laws or regulations, those entrusted to them by the president of the republic, as well as those not expressly assigned to other secretariats of state.

Finally, through Decree No. 1 of June 1, 2014, published in Official Gazette No. 100, reforms were made to the Internal Regulations of the Executive Branch. The name of the ministry was changed to the Ministry of the Interior and Territorial Development. In addition, new powers were incorporated, which are detailed in Article 34 of Decree No. 1.

=== Ministry of the Interior and Territorial Development ===
According to Decree No. 1 of June 2, 2014, the Ministry of the Interior was renamed: Ministry of the Interior and Territorial Development and its powers are:

- To oversee and ensure matters relating to the political and administrative organization of the Republic;
- To endorse and communicate the decrees, agreements, orders and provisions of the President of the Republic when they refer to matters relating to the Presidency of the Republic, as well as those relating to matters that do not have a specific subject matter;
- To promote and strengthen a culture of social peace, especially through the evaluation and control of film material, television and radio broadcasts; as well as to prevent and guide on the inappropriateness of public shows that encourage a loss of values or promote a climate of violence, especially in children and young people;
- To organize and maintain a system for prevention, guidance, mitigation and response to disasters and emergencies of any nature at the national level;
- To manage and administer the Fire Department of El Salvador;
- To authorize the Decrees of the President of the Republic and the Executive Agreements granting legal personality and existence to non-profit foundations and associations and religious institutions, in accordance with the law, keeping the registration thereof, as well as authorizing foreign associations and foundations to operate in the country;
- To authorize the operation of Arbitration Centers, in accordance with the respective law and to impose sanctions for violations thereof;
- To manage and administer the National Printing Office and the Official Gazette;
- To manage and administer the Government Centers;
- To attend to and coordinate everything related to the national and international postal service of El Salvador;
- Authorize the operation of private cemeteries, in accordance with the law;
- To authorize raffles, lotteries and commercial promotions, in accordance with the respective laws;
- Represent the country abroad, in the areas of their competence, in coordination with the corresponding bodies;
- To coordinate the implementation of the guidelines and strategies for decentralization and local development as tools for territorial development;
- Advise and promote local initiatives for decentralization, local development and municipal associations; consolidate the Departmental Cabinets:
- To coordinate the articulation of the processes of decentralization, local development and municipal association with the participation of economic organizations and civil society;
- Incorporate territories as actors, increasing social participation in the development of strategies, programs and plans, as well as public and private investment;
- Systematize and disseminate experiences and best practices of decentralization processes, local development and municipal association at the national level;
- Collaborate with the management, negotiation, coordination and administration of the international cooperation necessary for the processes of decentralization, local and territorial development;
- Participate in monitoring the processes of decentralization, local and territorial development;
- To integrate the organizational, political, social, and economic capacities of the territories, as local engines of development; empowering the different actors in the territory, especially the popular sectors, with a vision of territorial development; and
- To exercise the other powers and responsibilities established by the laws or regulations, entrusted to it by the President of the Republic, as well as those not expressly assigned to other State Secretariats.

This State Ministry has undergone several changes, both in name and responsibilities. However, under the current administration and with the new appointment, it has focused primarily on Territorial Development. This approach involves coordination among various government institutions, the implementation of public policies at the territorial level, and the promotion of processes that foster social organization and participation.

=== Government Centers ===
In early 1994, the modernization of the public sector was proposed with the project to create Government Centers in the departmental capitals throughout the country. Primarily utilizing facilities vacated by the Armed Forces after the Peace Accords, the Ministry of the Interior (now the Ministry of the Interior and Territorial Development) presented to the Council of Ministers the initiative to rehabilitate spaces such as the former Atonal Battalion in Usulután, Military Detachment No. 3 in La Unión, and the Arce Battalion in San Miguel. The project also included the former Health Center in Sensuntepeque, Cabañas, and a property in Zacatecoluca, La Paz, formerly belonging to the Ministry of Finance. These facilities were incorporated gradually, with the former Military Detachment No. 3 in La Unión becoming the first Departmental Government Center, inaugurated in October 1996.

An additional example is the former Military Detachment No. 4 in San Francisco Gotera, Morazán, which came under the responsibility of the Ministry of the Interior. Through the Administration of Government Centers and with the authorization of the Council of Ministers in October 1999, it was rehabilitated as a Government Center. The former Revenue Administrations of the Ministry of Finance in Chalatenango and Santa Ana, transferred to the Ministry of the Interior and Territorial Development, were also adapted to become Government Centers between 2000 and 2001.

== Ministers ==
- Mario Edgardo Durán Gavidia (Cabinet of Nayib Bukele)
