= Carla Hananía de Varela =

Salvadoran politician

Carla Evelyn Hananía de Varela is a Salvadoran politician from Nuevas Ideas who served as Minister of Education, Science and Technology in the Cabinet of Nayib Bukele, having been appointed on 1 June 2019. According to the Official Gazette on February 23, 2022, she left office due to health concerns. However, her son claims that she was fired from the position by Bukele. She was succeeded in the position by José Mauricio Pineda Rodríguez.
