= Juan Martínez Téllez de los Ríos =

Spanish royal officer

Mayor of San Salvador
- In office 1647–1652
- Monarch: Philip IV of Spain
- Preceded by: Antonio Justiniano Chavarri
- Succeeded by: José Portal de Artavia

Personal details
- Born: c. 1590s Colmenar Viejo, Crown of Castille
- Died: February 9, 1657 Guatemala City, New Spain
- Spouse: Ana de Ubois y Salazar

Military service
- Allegiance: Spain
- Branch/service: Marine Infantry
- Rank: Captain

Juan Martínez Téllez de los Ríos (Colmenar Viejo, Crown of Castile, c. 1590s – Guatemala City, February 9, 1657) was a captain in the Royal Armies who participated in the defense of Callao, Viceroyalty of Peru, in 1624. He served as Chief Scribe of the Guatemala City council from 1631 to 1637, Attorney General from 1639 to 1642, and Mayor of San Salvador from 1647 to 1650.

== Biography ==
Martínez was born in the 1590s in Colmenar Viejo, Crown of Castile, to Juan Martínez de Madrid y Ríos and Catalina Téllez. He moved to the Americas in 1618. In May 1624, as captain of his own ship, he participated in the defense of Callao, Peru, during an attack by Dutch pirates led by Jacques L'Hermite. The viceroy of Peru, Diego Fernández de Córdoba, also tasked him with warning the port of El Realejo in Nicaragua of potential dangers.

He served under Maestre de Campo Sebastián Ruiz de Castro for three months before becoming Lieutenant General of Nicaragua, managing the Royal Treasury’s accounts and quelling a mutiny. In December 1624, he was named procurator of the Real Audiencia of Guatemala.

From 1631 to 1637, Martínez held various roles in Guatemala City, including chief public scribe, council member, and tax collector. He was also involved in trade between Spain and the Americas and issued bonds to newly appointed officials.

On December 21, 1632, he married Ana de Ubois y Salazar. Their daughter, Juana Téllez de Salazar, was born in 1635.

In 1639, Martínez was appointed Attorney General by the Guatemala City council, after which he traveled to Spain to address legal matters affecting the council. On February 15, 1640, he presented a list of achievements before the Council of the Indies, requesting the king to grant him a position on the American continent. In 1642, King Philip IV appointed him Mayor of San Salvador, though he did not take office until 1647 due to administrative delays.

Martínez served as mayor until 1652 and later became a member of the Spanish Inquisition in 1653. He died on February 9, 1657, leaving a sealed will from 1655.
