= Tigre Hotel =

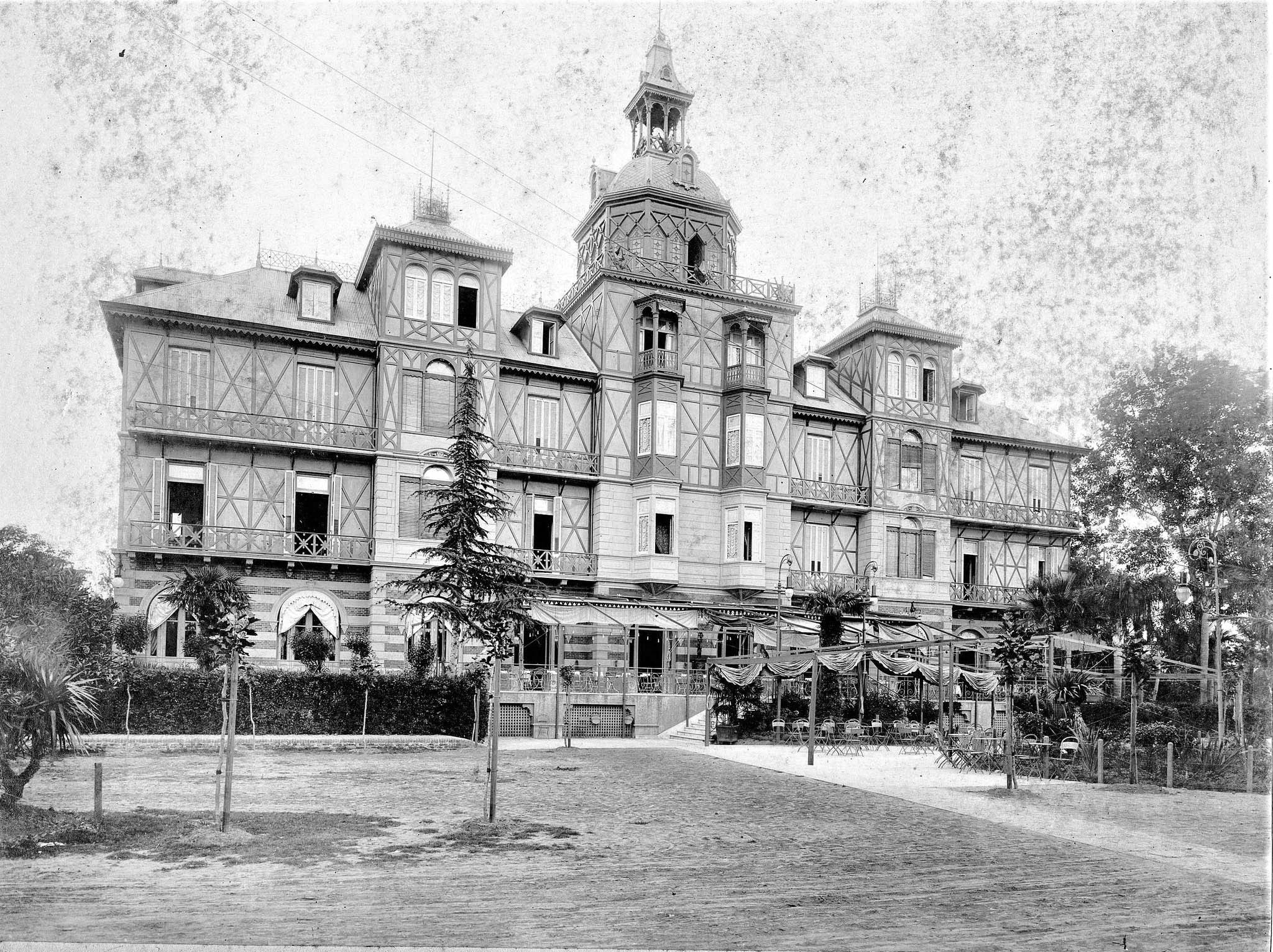
- The hotel c. 1900s
- Interactive map of the Tigre Hotel area

General information
- Type: Hotel
- Location: Paseo Victorica, Tigre, Argentina
- Coordinates: 34.4093781°S 58.58943383°W
- Construction started: 1873
- Inaugurated: February 1890
- Closed: 1933; 93 years ago
- Demolished: 1940

Technical details
- Floor count: 3

Design and construction
- Civil engineer: Emilio Mitre

The Tigre Hotel was an Argentine hotel that stood on the banks of the Luján River, in Paseo Victorica, Tigre, 28 km (17 mi) north of Buenos Aires city. The hotel's peak was during the late 19th and early 20th centuries, when Tigre was one of the places chosen by the upper classes to spend their holidays.

The hotel also featured the first casino in the country, but a 1933 law forbidding gambling in Argentina caused the building to be closed; it was finally demolished in 1940.

== History ==
The idea of constructing a hotel in Tigre (then named Las Conchas) came from a group of rowing enthusiasts who met at the Pulpería del Portugués of Buenos Aires in February 1870. In addition, several rowing clubs (such as Buenos Aires R.C.) then established their headquarters in the area. After searching for vacant land, they finally found a site near the confluences of the Reconquista and Luján Rivers.

The hotel was designed by engineer Emilio Mitre (son of Argentine president Bartolomé Mitre) and financed by Mitre himself with Ernesto Tornquist and Luis García. Works began in 1873 and the hotel was finally inaugurated on February 12, 1890. It soon became an important social, tourist and sporting centre, not only for the people of Tigre, but also for porteños. The hotel had three floors, an elevator and 50 rooms (all of them heated) with a ground floor dining room seating 200 people. There were salons for smoking, billiards, and for ladies. The hotel had a coffeehouse, tennis courts, a cricket pitch, an area for roller skating, and there was a garage for cars.

In November 1892 the proprietors requested the Municipality of Tigre permission to organise regattas on Sunday and holidays. Three years later, the hotel was authorised to open a casino. By then, services also included evenings with fireworks, a permanent orchestra and other attractions on the banks of the Luján River. An Andalusian patio and a winter garden were constructed afterwards.

In the late 19th century, Ludovico Schafer and E. E. Fischer acquired Tigre Hotel. The house was re-opened in 1895 with an inaugural lunch. Some of the changes made by the new owners included the suppression of the roulette room.

In 1916 various repairs and improvements were made to the building at the height of the Belle Époque as the hotel became the place where the elite of society of the time met and stayed; the hotel was famous for its dancing parties. The Great Depression took its toll, and in February 1933 the hotel closed its doors definitely, forced through a law promulgated by the Legislature forbidding gambling in Argentina. One year later, the building was destroyed by fire and subsequently demolished.

The place where the Tigre Hotel stood remained abandoned until the Tigre City Council building was constructed there, next to Tigre Club (nowadays the Tigre Art Museum).

== Facilities ==
The hotel had three floors and 120 rooms, with large terraces and luxurious panelling. It also had unique amenities for the time, such as central heating and an elevator. Its gardens had tennis courts and cricket field and fireworks shows were held. A garage was built later.

In the interior, guests smoked in a special room or participated in dances and costume parties in the rooms, accompanied by a permanent orchestra, a detail that may have pleased Enrico Caruso, famous Italian tenor and guest at the Tigre Hotel. In case guests wished take a walk along the river, a boat took the clients along the Tigre River to its own pier on the Luján River. One of its main attractions was the water parade, a parade of boats and steamers that, descending from the Carapachay River, went up the Luján River and passed through the doors of the hotel, until reaching the Marine Workshops (current Naval Museum).

== In popular culture ==
Today, there is occasionally confusion between the Tigre Hotel and the Tigre Club, which was built next to the hotel in 1912 and is still standing. Following its 1979 designation as a National Historic Monument, a decade of refurbishments ensued. The Tigre Art Museum was opened in 2006.

== Bibliography ==
- Graciela Clemente, Tigre y Delta, Grijalbo Mondadori, Buenos Aires, 2004.
