= Morena Valdez =

Salvadoran communicator, academic and politician (born 1973 or 1974)

Minister of Tourism of El Salvador
- Incumbent
- Assumed office 1 June 2019
- President: Nayib Bukele
- Preceded by: Napoleón Duarte

Personal details
- Born: 1973 or 1974 (age 51–52) El Salvador
- Education: Central American University, San Salvador

Morena Ileana Valdez Vigil (born 1973 or 1974) is a Salvadoran communicator, academic and politician. She has been serving as Minister of Tourism of El Salvador since 2019.

== Early life and education ==
Valdez was born in 1973 or 1974 in El Salvador in a family affected by the Salvadoran Civil War and was raised by her mother and grandmother, her two main role models. She did gymnastic as a child.

She studied electrical engineering for two years at the Central American University, San Salvador, before switching courses and eventually graduating there with a degree in business administration. Valdez subsequently took courses in advertising strategies, human development, gender and public policy, and development planning and social protection.

== Career ==
In 1996, she joined H. Marketing, a division of the advertising agency McCann Erickson, where Valdez worked for companies such as Coca-Cola. After carrying out various marketing and social research consultancy projects in the late 1990s, between 2001 and 2006 she worked with the United Nations Development Programme, and in the same year she became an advisor on monitoring and social visibility for the Conditional Cash Transfer project, promoted by the Salvadoran government.

In 2007, she worked at the Social Investment Fund for Local Development as a planning and public relations specialist, and in 2011 she became Manager of Communications and Institutional Marketing at PROESA, El Salvador's Export and Investment Promotion Agency. Since 2010, Valdez has been a lecturer at the ‘Mónica Herrera’ School of Communication, teaching on the Integrated Marketing Communications and Strategic Design courses. She has also taught on the Economics and Business course at the Higher School of Economics and Business. Valdez was appointed director of El Salvador's Country Brand in February 2017.

On 30 May 2019, newly elected President Nayib Bukele announced Valdez as the new Minister of Tourism of El Salvador. She was sworn in on 1 June 2019, succeeding Napoleón Duarte During her term in office, the country's tourism sector has undergone significant growth and transformation, and Valdez has been recognised by the press as one of the most popular politicians. In December 2025 she announced that the country exceeded the government's target of 4 million tourists.

== Personal life ==
She is interested in surfing, swimming, sailing, and reading.
