= Mayor of San Salvador =

Salvadoran government position

- Alcalde de San Salvador
- Coat of arms of San Salvador

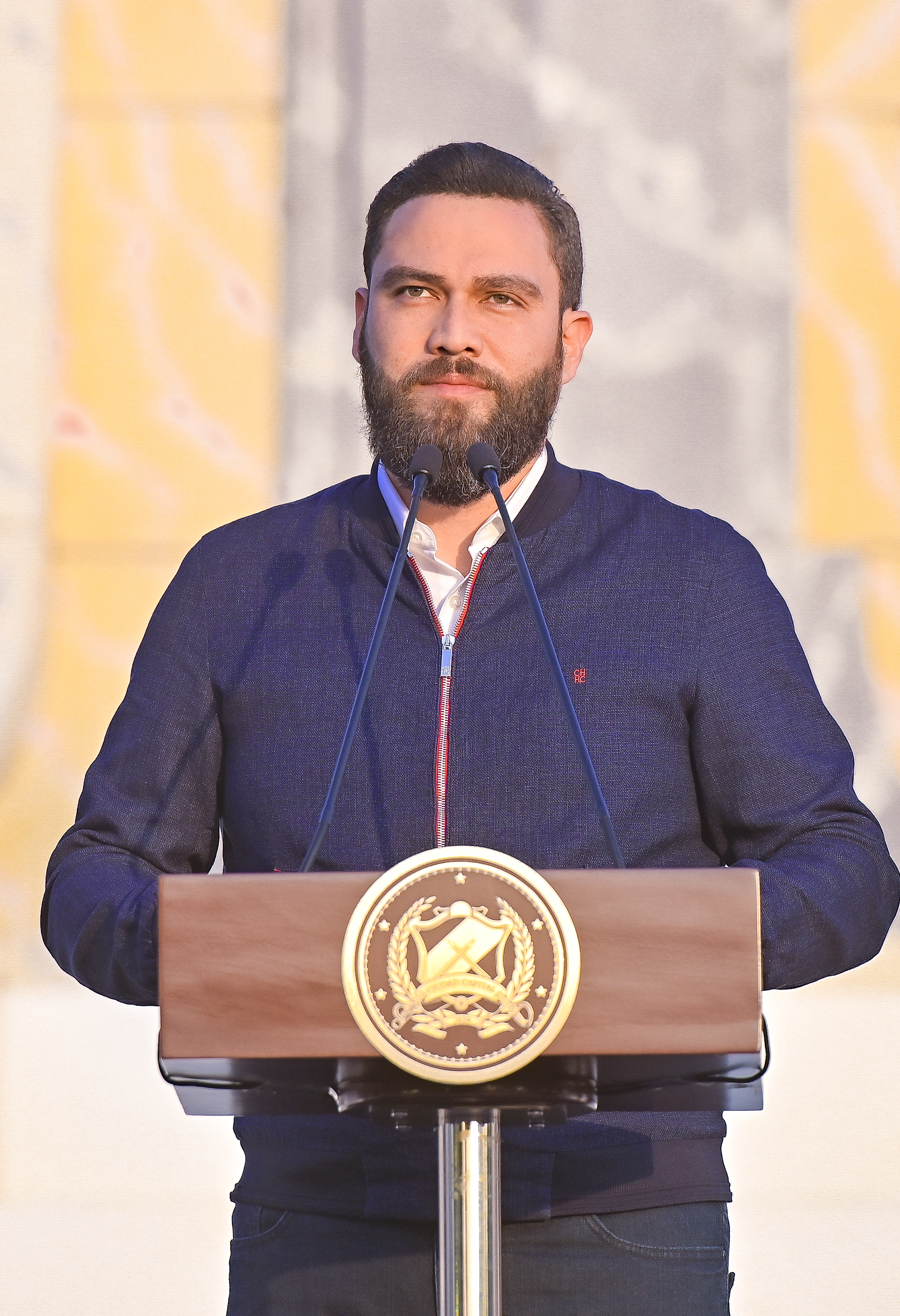
- Incumbent; Mario Durán since 1 May 2021
- Seat: San Salvador
- Term length: 3 years
- Formation: 1 April 1525
- First holder: Diego de Holguín
- Website: Alcalde de San Salvador

The Mayor of San Salvador (Spanish: Alcalde de San Salvador) is the head of the municipal government of the city of San Salvador, the capital city of El Salvador.

== History ==
The position of Mayor of San Salvador was established on 1 April 1525 with Diego de Holguín, a Spanish conquistador, serving as its first mayor. He served as mayor of the old city of San Salvador, now known as Ciudad Vieja. The city was refounded in 1528 in its modern location and Diego de Alvarado assumed the mayorship of San Salvador.

== List of mayors ==
=== Lieutenant Governors ===
No.	Portrait	Lieutenant Governor	Took office	Left office	Time in office	Ref
1		Diego de Holguín (1486–1556)	1 April 1525	1 April 1528	3 years, 0 days	
2		Diego de Alvarado (?–1540)	1 April 1528	22 April 1529	1 year, 21 days	
3		Gaspar Arias Dávila (1490–1543)	22 April 1529	July 1529	c. 54 days	
4		Diego de Rojas (1500–1544)	July 1529	1530	c. 321 days	
5		Luis de Moscoso Alvarado (1505–1551)	1530	1532	c. 2 years, 0 days	
6		Gómez de Alvarado (1482–1542)	1532	1534	c. 2 years, 0 days	
7		Jorge de Alvarado (1460–1553)	1534	1535	c. 1 year, 0 days	

=== Ordinary Mayors ===
No.	Portrait	Ordinary Mayor	Took office	Left office	Time in office	Ref
8		Isidro Blasco (?–?)	1535	1536	c. 1 year, 0 days	
9		Alonso de Oliveros (1490–1550)	1536	1537	c. 1 year, 0 days	
10		Pedro Cerón (1492–1572)	1537	1538	c. 1 year, 0 days	
11		Antonio Docampo (1490–1560)	1538	1539	c. 1 year, 0 days	
12		Antonio Bermúdez (?–?)	1539	1540	c. 1 year, 0 days	
13		Luis Dubre (?–?)	1540	1541	c. 1 year, 0 days	
14		Pedro Cerón (1492–1572)	1541	1544	c. 3 years, 0 days	
15		Cristóbal Salvago (1490–1560)	1544	1548	c. 4 years, 0 days	
16		Luis Dubois (1510–1570s)	1548	1549	c. 1 year, 0 days	
17		Juan Vázquez de Coronado (1523–1565)	1549	1552	c. 3 years, 0 days	
18		Gaspar de Cepeda (1498–1558)	1552	1555	c. 3 years, 0 days	
19		Ambrosio Méndez (?–?)	1555	1556	c. 1 year, 0 days	
20		Hernando Bermejo (?–?)	1556	1558	c. 2 years, 0 days	
21		Juan de Tovar (?–?)	1558	1559	c. 1 year, 0 days	
22		Pedro Benavides (?–?)	1559	1562	c. 3 years, 0 days	
23		Pedro Cerón (1492–1572)	1562	1564	c. 2 years, 0 days	
24		Juan Núñez de Prado (?–?)	1564	1567	c. 3 years, 0 days	
25		Lope Pardo (?–?)	1567	1569	c. 2 years, 0 days	
26		Luis Dubois (1510–1570s)	1569	1570	c. 1 year, 0 days	
27		Hernando Bermejo (?–?)	1570	1572	c. 2 years, 0 days	
28		Gómez Díaz de la Reguera (1508–1588)	1572	1573	c. 1 year, 0 days	
29		Luis Ganboa (?–?)	1573	1577	c. 4 years, 0 days	
30		Ignacio Cota (?–?)	1577	1579	c. 2 years, 0 days	

=== Greater Mayors ===
No.	Portrait	Greater Mayor	Took office	Left office	Time in office	Ref
–		Diego Galán (1530–1600); Interim Mayor	1579	1580	c. 1 year, 0 days	
–		Juan Cisneros de Reynoso y Valverde (1530–?); Interim Mayor	1580	1581	c. 1 year, 0 days	
31		Alonso de Nava (1520–1590)	1581	1586	c. 5 years, 0 days	
32		Lucas Pinto (1540–1588)	1586	1588	c. 2 years, 0 days	
–		Diego de Paz y Quiñones (1540–1630); Interim Mayor	1588	1590	c. 2 years, 0 days	
–		Pedro Girón de Alvarado (1545–1603); Interim Mayor	1590	1593	c. 3 years, 0 days	
–		Luis de Fuentes y de la Cerda (1570–?); Interim Mayor	1593	1594	c. 1 year, 0 days	
33		Martín de Vega y Aceituno (?–?)	1594	1596	c. 2 years, 0 days	
34		Francisco Osorio y Ávalos (1560–?)	1596	1603	c. 7 years, 0 days	
35		Juan Guiral de Mencis (?–1610)	1603	1607	c. 4 years, 0 days	
36		Andrés Dorantes de Laguna (?–1658)	1607	1614	c. 7 years, 0 days	
37		Pedro Farfán de los Godos (?–1623)	1614	1620	c. 6 years, 0 days	
38		Pedro de Aguilar Lazo de la Vega (1585–?)	1620	1626	c. 6 years, 0 days	
39		Pedro de Torres y Toledo (?–1656)	1626	1631	c. 5 years, 0 days	
40		Eugenio de Rueda y Góngora (1580–?)	1631	1635	c. 4 years, 0 days	
41		Juan Sarmiento de Valderrama (1590–1665)	1635	1641	c. 6 years, 0 days	
–		Martín Duarte Fernández (1575–1642); Interim Mayor	1641	1642	c. 1 year, 0 days	
–		Antonio Justiniano Chavarri (?–?); Interim Mayor	1642	1647	c. 5 years, 0 days	
42		Juan Martínez Téllez de los Ríos (1590s–1657)	1647	1652	c. 5 years, 0 days	
43		José Portal de Artavia (?–?)	1652	1657	c. 5 years, 0 days	
44		Francisco Andrabeja (?–?)	1657	1659	c. 2 years, 0 days	
–		Lupercio de Espés y Brizuela (?–?); Interim Mayor	1659	1663	c. 4 years, 0 days	
45		Pedro de Saravelles (?–?)	1663	1670	c. 7 years, 0 days	
46		Martín de Revollar (?–?)	1670	1673	c. 3 years, 0 days	
47		Juan de Miranda (?–?)	1673	1680	c. 7 years, 0 days	
–		Diego de Gamarra y Balcárcel (?–?); Interim Mayor	1680	1684	c. 4 years, 0 days	
48		Pedro Calvo del Risco (?–?)	1684	1689	c. 5 years, 0 days	
49		José de Arría y Hurtado (?–?)	1689	1694	c. 5 years, 0 days	
50		José Calvo de Lara (?–?)	1694	1699	c. 5 years, 0 days	
51		Bartolomé Gálvez Corral (?–?)	1699	1703	c. 4 years, 0 days	
–		Juan Antonio Ruiz de Bustamante (1670–1725); Interim Mayor	1703	1706	c. 3 years, 0 days	
–		Francisco Chacón Medina y Salazar (?–?); Interim Mayor	1706	1708	c. 2 years, 0 days	
52		Nicolás de Segovia Parada y Verdugo (?–?)	1708	1710	c. 2 years, 0 days	
–		Francisco Rodríguez Franco (?–?); Interim Mayor	1710	1715	c. 5 years, 0 days	
53		Pedro de Oyanarte (?–1716)	1715	1716	c. 1 year, 0 days	
–		Estebán de Larramendi (?–?); Interim Mayor	1716	1718	c. 2 years, 0 days	
54		José Llanes Robles (?–?)	1718	1721	c. 3 years, 0 days	
–		Pedro de Doralea (?–1723); Interim Mayor	1721	1723	c. 2 years, 0 days	
–		Rodrigo Salgado (?–?); Interim Mayor	1723	1724	c. 1 year, 0 days	
55		Pedro de Echevers (?–?)	1724	1729	c. 5 years, 0 days	
56		Antonio González Manrique (1695–1738)	1729	1734	c. 5 years, 0 days	
57		Cristóbal Marcos de Gálvez Corral (?–?)	1734	1737	c. 3 years, 0 days	
–		Manuel de Gálvez y Corral (?–?); Interim Mayor	1737	1740	c. 3 years, 0 days	
58		Esteban Sánchez Calderón (?–?)	1740	1744	c. 4 years, 0 days	
59		Isidro Díaz de Vivar (?–?)	1744	1751	c. 7 years, 0 days	
60		Domingo Soto Bermúdez (?–?)	1751	1756	c. 5 years, 0 days	
–		Manuel Amate (?–?); Interim Mayor	1756	1757	c. 1 year, 0 days	
61		Bernabé de la Torre Trassierra (?–1773)	1757	1759	c. 2 years, 0 days	
–		Francisco Ignacio Chamorro (1719–1785); Interim Mayor	1759	1761	c. 2 years, 0 days	
–		Manuel Fradique y Goyena (?–?); Interim Mayor	1761	1763	c. 2 years, 0 days	
–		José Jacinto Palomo y Rodríguez (?–?); Interim Mayor	1763	1765	c. 2 years, 0 days	
62		Cristóbal Marcos de Gálvez Corral (?–?)	1765	1766	c. 1 year, 0 days	
–		Manuel Fradique y Goyena (?–?); Interim Mayor	1766	1771	c. 5 years, 0 days	
63		Bernabé de la Torre Trassierra (?–1773)	1771	1773	c. 2 years, 0 days	
–		Francisco Antonio de Aldana y Guevarra (?–?); Interim Mayor	1773	1774	c. 1 year, 0 days	
–		Melchor de Mencos y Barón de Berrieza (?–?); Interim Mayor	1774	1777	c. 3 years, 0 days	
–		Manuel Fradique y Goyena (?–?); Interim Mayor	1777	1779	c. 2 years, 0 days	
64		Manuel Fradique y Goyena (?–?)	1779	1786	c. 7 years, 0 days	

=== Colonial Intendants ===
No.	Portrait	Colonial Intendant	Took office	Left office	Time in office	Ref
65		José Ortiz de la Peña (?–?)	1786	1789	c. 3 years, 0 days	
66		Francisco Luis Héctor de Carondelet (1748–1807)	1789	1791	c. 2 years, 0 days	
67		José Antonio María de Aguilar (1758–1799)	1791	1793	c. 2 years, 0 days	
68		Ignacio Santiago Ulloa (?–1789)	1793	1 January 1798	c. 4 years, 214 days	
–		José Antonio María de Aguilar (1758–1799); Interim Mayor	1 January 1798	15 September 1799	1 year, 257 days	
–		Bernardo José de Arce (?–?); Interim Mayor	15 September 1799	1800	c. 108 days	
–		Luis Martínez Navarrete (?–?); Interim Mayor	1800	1801	c. 1 year, 0 days	
–		Luis de Argueda (?–?); Interim Mayor	1801	1802	c. 1 year, 0 days	
–		José Justiniano Rosi (?–?); Interim Mayor	1802	1803	c. 1 year, 0 days	
–		Buenaventura de Viteri (?–?); Interim Mayor	1803	1804	c. 1 year, 0 days	
–		Francisco Vallejo (?–?); Interim Mayor	1804	1804	c. 152 days	
–		Antonio Isidro Palomo (?–?); Interim Mayor	1804	28 June 1805	c. 1 year, 27 days	
69		Antonio Gutiérrez y Ulloa (?–?)	28 June 1805	5 November 1811	6 years, 130 days	
–		José Mariano Batres y Asturias (?–?); Interim Mayor	5 November 1811	3 December 1811	28 days	
–		José Alejandro de Aycinena (1767–1826); Interim Mayor	3 December 1811	August 1812	c. 242 days	
70		José María Peinado y Pezonarte (1769–1820)	August 1812	1814	c. 1 year, 153 days	
–		José Méndez de Quiroga (?–1817); Interim Mayor	1814	1817	c. 3 years, 0 days	
–		Juan Miguel de Bustamante (?–?); Interim Mayor	1817	1818	c. 1 year, 0 days	
–		Simón Gutiérrez (1780–?); Interim Mayor	1818	1818	c. 151 days	
71		José María Peinado y Pezonarte (1769–1819)	1818	1819	c. 1 year, 0 days	
–		Pedro Barriere (1768–1827); Interim Mayor	1819	21 September 1821	c. 5 years, 112 days	

=== Mayors of San Salvador (1821–2024) ===
No.	Portrait	Mayor	Took office	Left office	Time in office	Party	Ref
1		Casimiro García Valdeavellano (?–?)	1821			Independent	
?		Data missing	1822	1833			
2		José María Peralta (1807–1883); Santos Montoya (?–?); José María Paredes (?–?)	1833		c. 1 year		
3		Torbirio Lara (?–?); Gregorio Zepeda (?–?); Feliciano Morales (?–?)	1834		c. 1 year		
4		Anastacio Rosi (?–?); José Tomás Campos (?–?); Guadalupe Ramos (?–?)	1835		c. 1 year		
5		José Gregorio Zepeda (?–?); Miguel Cáceres (?–?); Tomás Henríquez (?–?)	1836		c. 1 year		
6		Juan José López (?–?); Fermín Palacios (?–?); Mariano Cáceres (?–?)	1837		c. 1 year		
7		Juan José López (?–?); José María San Martín (1811–1857); José Meléndez (?–?)	1838		c. 1 year		
8		Eugenio Aguilar (1804–1897); Dámaso Blanco (?–?); Serafín Martínez (?–?)	1839		c. 1 year		
9		Rafael Francisco Osejo (1790–1848); Ignacio Carrillo (?–?); Isidro Viteri (?–?)	1840		c. 1 year		
10		Benito González Martínez (1776–1852); Vicente Aguilar (?–?); Blas Orozco (?–?)	1841		c. 1 year		
11		Marcos Idigoras (?–?); Ignacio Pérez (?–?); Juan Orozco (?–?)	1842		c. 1 year		
12		Santiago Melchor (?–?); Ignacio Carrillo (?–?); Pedro Abrego (?–?)	1843		c. 1 year		
13		Vicente Roque (?–?); Juan José Pablo Choto (?–?); Coronado Amaya (?–?)	1844		c. 1 year		
14		José María Basurto (?–?); Miguel Sifontes (?–?); Simón Pinto (?–?)	1845		c. 1 year		
15		Juan Orozco (?–?); Manuel Fuentes (?–?); Tomás Ayón (?–?)	1846		c. 1 year		
16		Marcos Idigoras (?–?); Mariano Morales (?–?); José María de Orantes (?–?)	1847		c. 1 year		
17		Antonio Delgado (?–?); Rafael Pino (?–?); Manuel Marín (?–?)	1848		c. 1 year		
18		Antonio Delgado (?–?); Nicolás Estupinián (?–?); Francisco Castro (?–?)	1849		c. 1 year		
19		José María Zelaya (?–?)	1850		c. 1 year	Independent	
20		José María Peralta (1807–1883)	1851		c. 1 year	Independent	
21		Rafael Meléndez (?–?)	1852		c. 1 year	Independent	
22		Guillermo Castro (?–?)	1853		c. 1 year	Independent	
23		Manuel Marín (?–?)	1854		c. 1 year	Independent	
24		José Antonio Delgado (?–?)	1855		c. 1 year	Independent	
25		José María Peralta (1807–1883)	1856		c. 1 year	Independent	
26		José María Dorantes (?–?)	1857		c. 1 year	Independent	
27		José María Carazo (?–?)	1858		c. 1 year	Independent	
28		Escolástico Andrino (?–?)	1859		c. 1 year	Independent	
29		José Rosales (1827–1891)	1860		c. 1 year	Independent	
30		Antonio Sifontes (?–?)	1861		c. 1 year	Independent	
31		Ignacio Guevara (?–?)	1862		c. 1 year	Independent	
32		Lius Fernández (?–?)	1863		c. 1 year	Independent	
33		Eugenio Aguilar (1804–1897)	1864	1867	c. 4 years	Liberal	
34		Doroteo Mijango (?–?)	1868		c. 1 year	Independent	
35		Rafael Meléndez (?–?)	1869		c. 1 year	Independent	
36		Manuel E. Aguilar (?–?)	1870		c. 1 year	Independent	
37		Narciso Imeri (?–?)	1871		c. 1 year	Independent	
38		Juan Barberena (?–?)	1872		c. 1 year	Independent	
39		Emigido Castro (?–?)	1873		c. 1 year	Independent	
40		José María Paredes (?–?)	1874		c. 1 year	Independent	
41		Rafael Reyes (?–?)	1875		c. 1 year	Independent	
42		José Rosales (1827–1891)	1876		c. 1 year	Independent	
43		Manuel Bertis (?–?)	1877		c. 1 year	Independent	
44		Manuel Meléndez (?–?)	1878		c. 1 year	Independent	
45		Antonio Peralta (?–?)	1879		c. 1 year	Independent	
46		Arturo Bustamante (?–?)	1880		c. 1 year	Independent	
47		Carlos Peralta (?–?)	1881		c. 1 year	Independent	
48		Isidro F. Paredes (?–?)	1882		c. 1 year	Independent	
49		Antonio Peralta (?–?)	1883		c. 1 year	Independent	
50		José María Paredes (?–?)	1884		c. 1 year	Independent	
51		Antonio González (?–?)	1885		c. 1 year	Independent	
52		Federico Prado (?–?)	1886		c. 1 year	Independent	
53		Francisco A. Funes (1854–?)	1887		c. 1 year	Independent	
54		Manuel Enrique Araujo (1865–1913)	1888		c. 1 year	Liberal	
55		Antonio Peralta (?–?)	1889		c. 1 year	Independent	
56		José María Paredes (?–?)	1890		c. 1 year	Independent	
57		Braulio Valencia (?–?)	1891		c. 1 year	Independent	
58		Dionisio Merlos (?–?)	1892		c. 1 year	Independent	
59		Daniel de Jesús Castillo (?–?)	1893		c. 1 year	Military	
60		Dionisio Merlos (?–?)	1894		c. 1 year	Independent	
61		Fidel Villalta (?–?)	1895		c. 1 year	Independent	
62		Braulio Monterrosa (?–?)	1896		c. 1 year	Independent	
63		Carlos d'Aubuisson (?–?)	1897		c. 1 year	Independent	
64		Francisco Arriola (?–?)	1898		c. 1 year	Independent	
65		Francisco Dueñas Jr. (?–?)	1899		c. 1 year	Independent	
66		Jesús Najarro (?–?)	1900		c. 1 year	Independent	
67		José Sagrera (?–?)	1901		c. 1 year	Independent	
68		Carlos d'Aubuisson (?–?)	1902		c. 1 year	Independent	
69		Daniel de Jesús Castillo (?–?)	1903		c. 1 year	Military	
70		Carlos Dueñas (1870–?)	1904		c. 1 year	Independent	
71		Antonio Peralta (?–?)	1905		c. 1 year	Independent	
72		Francisco Escobar (?–?)	1906		c. 1 year	Independent	
73		Guadalupe Ramírez (?–?)	1907		c. 1 year	Independent	
74		Rafael Vides Castro (?–?)	1908		c. 1 year	Independent	
75		Juan F. Orozco (?–?)	1909		c. 1 year	Independent	
76		Margarito González (?–?)	1910		c. 1 year	Independent	
77		Manuel Esquivel (?–?)	1911		c. 1 year	Independent	
78		Alfonso Quiñónez Molina (1874–1950)	1912		c. 1 year	Liberal	
79		Santiago Letona Hernández (?–?)	1913		c. 1 year	Independent	
80		Ismael Gómez (?–?)	1914		c. 1 year	Independent	
81		Rafael Zaldívar Jr. (?–?)	1915		c. 1 year	Independent	
82		Enrique González Serrano (?–?)	1916		c. 1 year	Independent	
83		Ramón García González Mejía (?–?)	1917		c. 1 year	Independent	
84		Carlos C. Urrutia (?–?)	1918		c. 1 year	Independent	
85		Ismael Gómez (?–?)	1919		c. 1 year	National Democratic Party	
86		Miguel Ángel Montalvo (?–?)	1920		c. 1 year	National Democratic Party	
87		José Simeón Pacheco (?–?)	1921		c. 1 year	National Democratic Party	
88		Ismael Gómez (?–?)	1922	1923	c. 2 years	National Democratic Party	
89		Miguel Ángel Montalvo (?–?)	1924	1927	c. 4 years	National Democratic Party	
90		Francisco Antonio Romero (?–?)	1928	1929	c. 2 years	Independent	
91		Vidal Severo López (?–?)	1930	1931	c. 2 years	Independent	
92		Roque Jacinto Bonilla (?–?)	1932	1933	c. 2 years	Independent	
93		Pablo Orellana (?–?)	1934	1935	c. 2 years	National Pro Patria Party	
94		Carlos Guzmán Dreyfus (?–?)	1936	1937	c. 2 years	National Pro Patria Party	
95		José María Melara Estrada (?–?)	1938	1943	c. 6 years	National Pro Patria Party	
96		Roberto López Rochac (?–?)	1944		c. 1 year	National Pro Patria Party	
97		Eusebio Argueta (?–?)	1945		c. 1 year	Independent	
98		José Ángel Avendaño (?–?)	1946		c. 1 year	Military	
99		Manuel Adriano Vilanova (1873–?)	1947	1948	c. 2 years	Unification Social Democratic Party	
100		Manuel López Harrison (?–?)	1949		c. 1 year	Independent	
101		Arturo Calderón Godoy (?–?)	1950			Revolutionary Party of Democratic Unification	
102		José Guillermo Trabanino (?–?)	1950	1954	c. 4 years	Revolutionary Party of Democratic Unification	
103		Pedro Escalante Arce (?–?)	1954	1956	c. 2 years	Revolutionary Party of Democratic Unification	
104		Ricardo Joaquín Peralta (?–?)	1956	1958	c. 2 years	Revolutionary Party of Democratic Unification	
105		Alfredo Ávila Figueroa (?–?)	1958	1960	c. 2 years	Revolutionary Party of Democratic Unification	
106		Gabriel Poliña Araujo (?–?)	August 1960	October 1960	c. 2 months	Revolutionary Party of Democratic Unification	
107		Raúl Arévalo Barriere (?–?)	October 1960	1962	c. 2 years	Renovating Action Party	
108		Carlos Call Kerrinck (?–?)	1962	June 1963	c. 1 year	Independent	
109		Fidel Antonio Novoa Arciniegas (?–?)	1963	1964	c. 1 year	Independent	
110		José Napoleón Duarte (1925–1990)	March 1964	1970	c. 6 years	Christian Democratic Party	
111		Carlos Herrera Rebollo (1935–1979)	1970	1 May 1974	c. 4 years	Christian Democratic Party	
112		José Antonio Morales Ehrlich (1935–2021)	1 May 1974	1 May 1976	2 years, 0 days	Christian Democratic Party	
113		José Napoleón Gómez (?–?)	1 May 1976	1 May 1978	2 years, 0 days	Independent	
114		Hugo Guerra y Guerra (?–?)	1 May 1978	November 1979	c. 1 year, 184 days	Independent	
115		Julio Adolfo Rey Prendes (?–?)	December 1979	December 1981	c. 2 years	Independent	
116		Ramiro Rolando Aguilar (?–?)	January 1982	1 May 1982	c. 4 months	Independent	
117		José Alejandro Duarte Durán (?–?)	1 May 1982	1 May 1985	3 years, 0 days	Independent	
118		José Antonio Morales Ehrlich (1935–2021)	1 May 1985	1 May 1988	3 years, 0 days	Christian Democratic Party	
119		Armando Calderón Sol (1948–2017)	1 May 1988	1 May 1994	6 years, 0 days	Nationalist Republican Alliance	
120		Mario Valiente (?–?)	1 May 1994	1 May 1997	3 years, 0 days	Nationalist Republican Alliance	
121		Héctor Silva Argüello (1974–2011)	1 May 1997	1 May 2003	6 years, 0 days	Farabundo Martí National Liberation Front	
122		Carlos Rivas Zamora (born ?)	1 May 2003	1 May 2006	3 years, 0 days	Farabundo Martí National Liberation Front	
123		Violeta Menjívar (born 1952)	1 May 2006	1 May 2009	3 years, 0 days	Farabundo Martí National Liberation Front	
124		Norman Quijano (born 1946)	1 May 2009	1 May 2015	6 years, 0 days	Nationalist Republican Alliance	
125		Nayib Bukele (born 1981)	1 May 2015	1 May 2018	3 years, 0 days	Farabundo Martí National Liberation Front (until 2017)	
(125)		Nayib Bukele (born 1981)	1 May 2015	1 May 2018	3 years, 0 days	Nuevas Ideas (from 2018)	
126		Ernesto Muyshondt (born 1975)	1 May 2018	1 May 2021	3 years, 0 days	Nationalist Republican Alliance	
127		Mario Durán (born 1983)	1 May 2021	1 May 2024	3 years, 0 days	Nuevas Ideas	

=== Mayors of San Salvador Centro (2024–present) ===
No.	Portrait	Mayor	Took office	Left office	Time in office	Party	Ref
1		Mario Durán (born 1983)	1 May 2024	Incumbent	2 years, 129 days	Nuevas Ideas	

== See also ==
- San Salvador

== Bibliography ==
- Arce, Escalante; Antonio, Pedro (2001). "Los Barrios de los Mexicanos en El Salvador" [The Mexican Neighborhoods in El Salvador]. Los Tlaxcaltecas en Centro América [The Tlaxcaltecas in Central America] (in Spanish) (1 ed.). San Salvador: Dirección de Publicaciones e Impresos and the Consejo Nacional para la Cultura y el Arte. pp. 115–137. OCLC 1036658730.
- Cruz Pacheco, José Santa; Cadenas y Vicent, Vicente (1981). "Relacion de los Alcaldes Mayores de San Salvador" [Relation of the Greater Mayors of San Salvador]. Hidalguía – La Revista de Genealogia, Nobelza y Armas [Hidalguía - The Magazine of Genealogy, Nobility and Arms] (in Spanish). Vol. 166–167. Madrid, Spain: Publicación Bimenstral. pp. 469–480. ISSN 0018-1285.
- García Granados, Jorge (1924). Libro Viejo de la Fundación de Guatemala y Papeles Relativos a D. Pedro de Alvarado [Old Book of the Foundation of Guatemala and Relative Papers to D. Pedro de Alvarado]. Biblioteca Goathemala de la Soc de Geografía y Historia; v. XII (in Spanish). Vol. 12. Guatemala City, Guatemala: Tipografía Nacional (published July 1934). pp. 1–14.
- Larde y Larín, Jorge (1983). El Salvador: Descubrimiento, Conquista y Colonización. Concultura.
- Meléndez Chaverri, Carlos (1961). José Matías Delgado, Prócer Centroamericano [José Matías Delgado, Central American Procreator] (in Spanish). Vol. 8 (2 ed.). San Salvador: Directorate of Publications and Prints, National Council for Culture and Art (published 2000). pp. 9–343. ISBN 9992300574.
- Rubio Sánchez, Manuel (1979). Alcaldes mayores: historia de los alcaldes mayores, justicias mayores, gobernadores intendentes, intendentes corregidores, y jefes políticos, de la Provincia de San Salvador, San Miguel y San Vicente [Major mayors: history of the major mayors, senior justices, governors mayors, mayors corregidores, and political bosses, of the Province of San Salvador, San Miguel and San Vicente]. Vol. 1. Ministerio de Educación.
