= Ministry of Education (El Salvador) =

Government ministry of El Salvador

Ministry of Education of El Salvador
- Ministry of Education
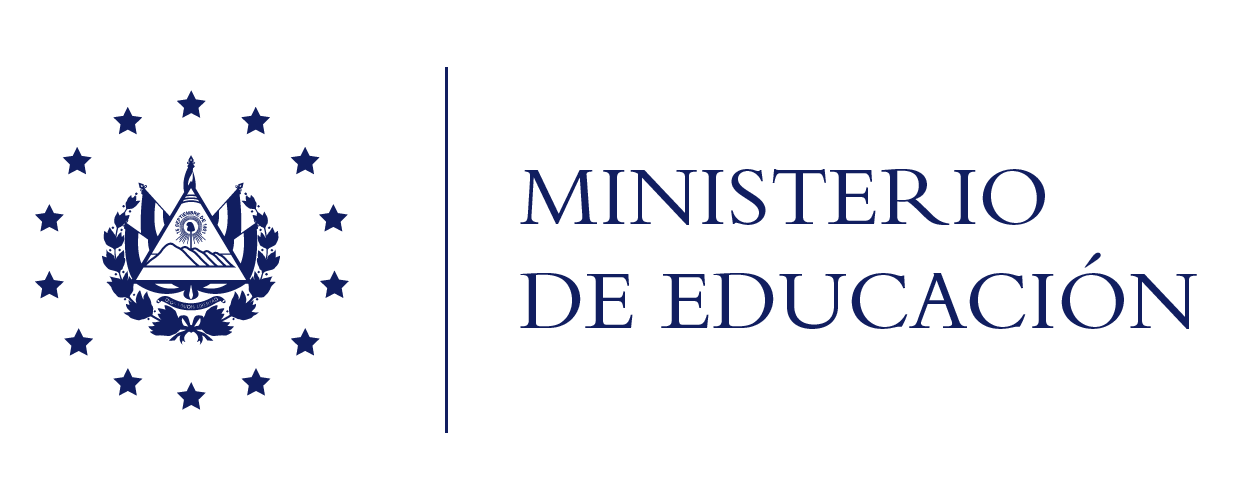

Agency overview
- Formed: June 1, 1940
- Jurisdiction: Government of El Salvador
- Headquarters: Edificios A, Plan Maestro, Centro de Gobierno, Alameda Juan Pablo II y calle Guadalupe, San Salvador. mark_region:El Salvador 13.71500°N 89.19167°W
- Agency executive: Karla Trigueros, Minister
- Website: Official website

The Ministry of Education, Science and Technology (Spanish: Ministerio de Educación, MINED) is a government ministry of El Salvador, headquartered in San Salvador.
