= Luis Dubois =

French-born Spanish colonial administrator

Mayor of San Salvador
- In office 1569–1569
- Preceded by: Lope Pardo
- Succeeded by: Hernando Bermejo
- In office 1556–1556
- Preceded by: Ambrosio Méndez
- Succeeded by: Hernando Bermejo
- In office 1548–1548
- Preceded by: Cristóbal Salvago
- Succeeded by: Juan Vázquez de Coronado

Personal details
- Born: 1510 Lille, County of Flanders
- Died: after 1572
- Spouse: Isabel de Salazar
- Children: 5
- Occupation: Colonial administrator

Luis Dubois (1510 – after 1572) was a Flemish-born Spanish colonial administrator. He served as mayor of San Salvador on three occasions during the mid 16th century.

== Biography ==
Luis Dubois was born in 1510 in Lille, County of Flanders, then a part of the Habsburg Netherlands. He and his parents moved to Spain in 1517 after Charles I became King of Spain. During Dubois' youth, he served as a page for Charles I.

Dubois met Pedro de Alvarado in Burgos in 1527, and the following year, Dubois joined him on a voyage to New Spain where he arrived in Veracruz. By 1530, Dubois arrived in Guatemala City, and by 1533, he resided in San Salvador. Dubois married Isabel de Salazar in Old San Salvador and the couple had five children. Dubois served as mayor of San Salvador in 1548, 1556, and 1569. In 1572, conquistador Alonso Morcillo reported that Dubois lived on an encomienda located in Santiago Nonualco and San Juan Nonualco.

Political offices
Preceded by Cristóbal Salvago	Mayor of San Salvador; 1548	Succeeded by Juan Vázquez de Coronado
Preceded by Ambrosio Méndez	Mayor of San Salvador; 1556	Succeeded by Hernando Bermejo
Preceded by Lope Pardo	Mayor of San Salvador; 1569	Succeeded by Hernando Bermejo
