= María Luisa Hayem =

Salvadoran economist and politician

Maria Luisa Hayem
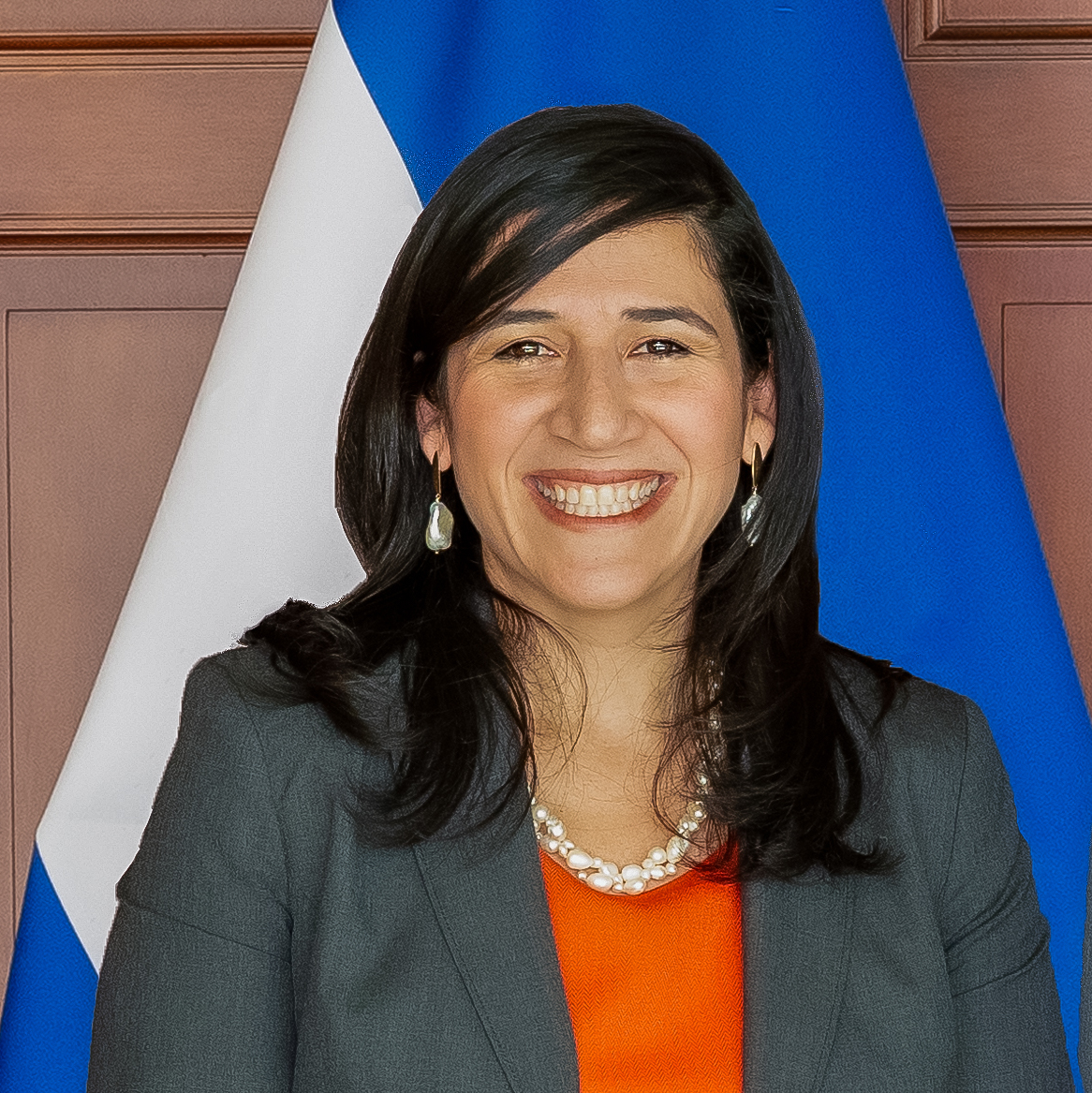
- Education: Higher School of Economics and Business, Tufts University and at the Sorbonne
- Known for: El Salvador's Minister of the Economy

Maria Luisa Hayem Brevé is a Salvadoran economist and politician. She became the Minister of the Economy of Salvador in 2019.

== Life ==
Hayem was educated as an economist with her first degree from the Higher School of Economics and Business in La Libertad. She studied in America at Tufts University and at the Ecole Supérieure Robert de Sorbon in France, and as a result she also speaks Spanish, English and French.

In 2003 she was in Geneva employed at El Salvador's Permanent Mission to the World Trade Organization.

She worked as a Finance Specialist at the Inter-American Development Bank. In 2010 she formed a non-profit organisation named Mentoring International which provides mentors for young people in El Salvador.

She was self employed when she became one of the last people to be appointed to President Nayib Bukele cabinet of eight men and eight women in 2019. She was appointed until 2024. El Salvador has poor relative growth and Hayem plans to reactivate her country's economy. Reactivation was affected by the Coronavirus pandemic when 110,000 Salvadorans lost their jobs. Hayem had to deal with efforts to bring the country back from lockdown.
