= Juan Vázquez de Coronado =

Spanish conquistador

Adelantado Juan Vázquez de Coronado
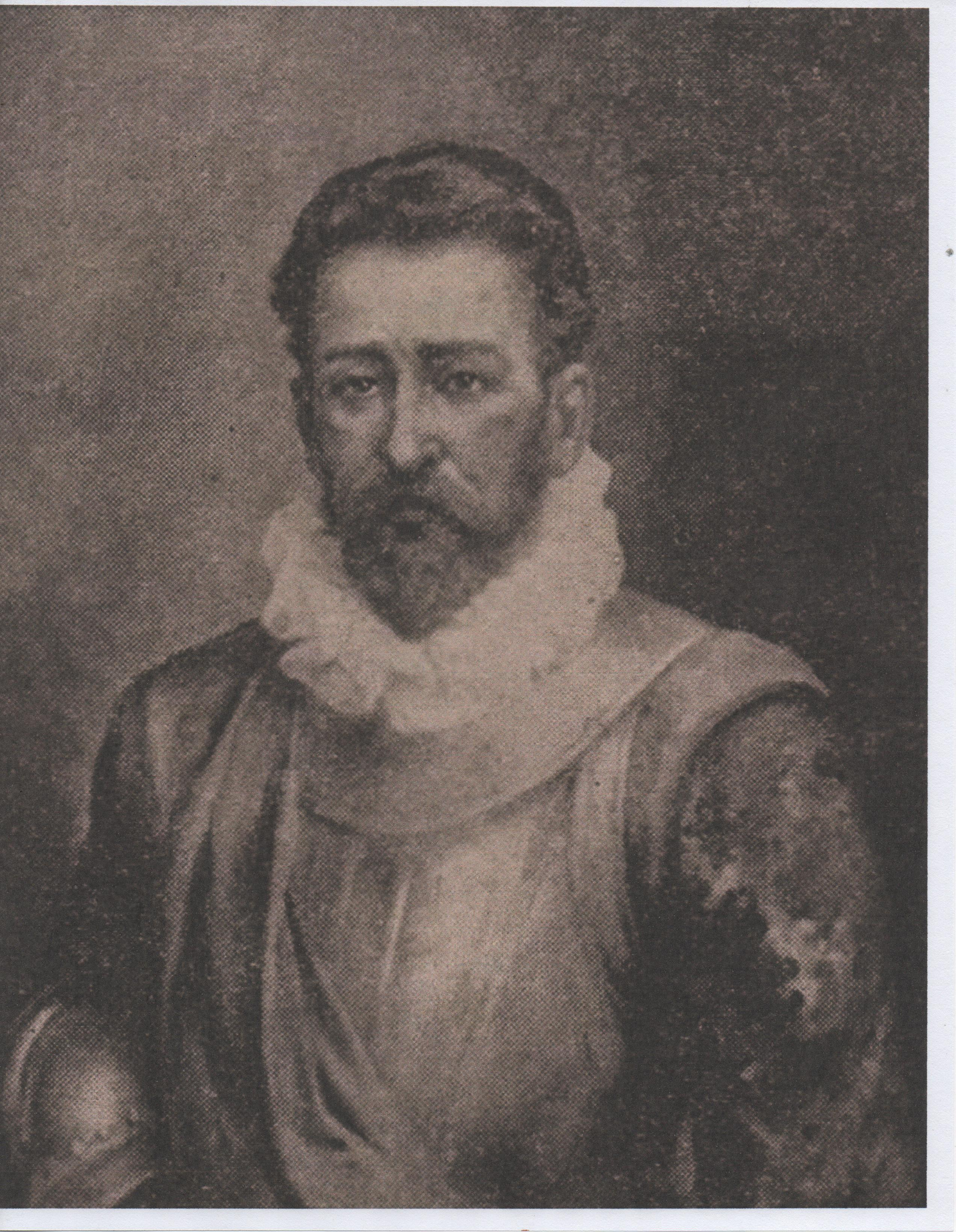
- Born: Juan Vázquez de Coronado y Anaya; 1523; Salamanca, Spain
- Died: 1565 (aged 41–42)
- Burial place: Off the coast of Sanlúcar de Barrameda, Spain
- Children: 1
- Military career
- Allegiance: Spain

Juan Vázquez de Coronado y Anaya (Spanish pronunciation: [ˈxwam ˈbaθkeθ ðe koɾoˈnaðo]; 1523–1565) was a Spanish conquistador, remembered especially for his role in the colonization of Costa Rica, in Central America, where he gained a reputation for fairness, effective administration, and good relationships with the native population. He was a nephew of Francisco Vázquez de Coronado y Luján, who explored the southwestern United States between 1540 and 1542.

By a decree given at Aranjuez by King Philip II of Spain on 8 April 1565, Juan Vásquez de Coronado was appointed as the first royal governor and first Adelantado (a hereditary title) of the province of Costa Rica, but his ship disappeared in a storm off the coast of southern Spain while he was on his way to receive his appointments from the monarch. He was married to Isabel, a niece of Pedro Arias Dávila, the principal conqueror of Panama. The Vázquez de Coronado Canton, one of the administrative divisions of the province of San José, in the Republic Costa Rica, was named in his honor.

== Life ==
Juan Vázquez de Coronado was born in Salamanca, Spain, the out of wedlock son of a prominent nobleman, Gonzalo Vásquez de Coronado y Luján (c. 1500 – Valladolid, 1540), sixth Lord of Coquilla and la Torre de Juan Vásquez, perpetual Alguacil-Mayor of the Royal Audiencia (i.e., appellate court) of Valladolid, (Note: Married to Antonia de Guzmán y Arauzo, from whom is descended the major branch of the family, heirs of the lordships and charges which was already titled with the Viscountship of Monterubio and the Marquessate of Coquilla in 1693 and posteriorly acquired by marriage the Countship of Montalvo and many other possessions.) by an extramatrimonial relationship with Catalina de Anaya, from whom there are no further details but undoubtedly belonged to one of the most principal families of Salamanca.

Vázquez de Coronado went very young to America, at only 17 years old, and established first in Mexico and then in Guatemala, where he started to fulfill official charges, such as Deputy of the Cabildo of the City of Santiago de los Caballeros and Ordinary Alcalde of Guatemala. In 1548 he married Isabel Arias-Dávila, the daughter of Captain Gaspar Arias-Dávila, and a first cousin to Pedrarias Dávila, both of whom were amongst the most prominent Conquerors of New Spain and Guatemala. Having issue, he passed to El Salvador, where he enjoyed of an encomienda at Naolingo and was appointed Alcalde-Mayor of San Salvador in 1549. Later he appears occupying the same charge in Honduras in 1556 and in Nicaragua in 1561 and finally in Costa Rica in 1562. In the country he distinguished himself for the pacific and fair way with which he executed the tasks of the conquest, being very respected and esteemed either by the Indians and by the Spanish colonists. In 1565 he traveled to Spain where for his merits King Philip II granted him the charge of Governor of Costa Rica and the hereditary title of Adelantado of Costa Rica. However, in the return voyage to take possession of his charges, his ship disappeared in a storm in front of the coasts of southern Spain.

One of the most relevant characters of Costa Rican history is without doubt Juan Vásquez de Coronado, conqueror, first Governor and first Adelantado of Costa Rica. Despite his historical transcendency as one of the main builders of the nation, Vásquez de Coronado is one of the main genearchs of the costarican population, to such a point that a widespread study evidences that he is the progenitor of a true elite, that which until 1975 has given 29 of its 44 Heads of State, and more than two hundred Parliamentaries.

== Issue ==
He and his wife had at least one son, Gonzalo Vázquez de Coronado y Arias Dávila, who married Ana Rodríguez del Padrón and had:

- Diego Vázquez de Coronado Rodríguez, married to Francisca del Castillo Hoces, and had:
  - Gertrudis Vázquez de Coronado y del Castillo, married to Pedro Ocón y Trillo, and had:
    - Juan Vázquez de Coronado married to Maria de Madrigal and they had /María Ocón y Trillo Vázquez de Coronado, married to Diego Vásquez de Montiel, and had:
      - Maria Vázquez de Coronado y Madrigal married to Pedro Durán de Chaves and they had,/Diego Vázquez Ocón y Trillo, married to Sebastiana Echavarría Navarro, and had:
        - Juan Durán Vasquezdez married to Maria Josefa Munoz Jan Duráan Vasquezde Coronado married, Maria de la Rosa Munoz and they had/Micaela Montiel Echavarria, married to Simón Lacayo de Briones Pomar, and had:
          - Joseph Francisco married to Juana Maria Cervantes LeonGabriel Lacayo Vázquez, married to Manuela Marenco Alarcón y Guerrero, and had:
            - Margarita Acuna Cervates married to Jose Angel Lisondro MongeFrancisca Lacayo Marenco, married to Blas de la Cerda Aguilar, and had:
              - Guadalupe Elizondo Acuna married to Cayetano Mora FallasCayetano de la Cerda Lacayo, married to María de Jesús Taborga ..., and had:
                - Marcelino Mora married to Maria Josefa Barrientos CamposManuel Antonio de la Cerda Taborga
- Isabel Ulloa Mora married to Jose Jesus Martinez Arguello /Andrea Vázquez de Coronado Rodríguez, married to Diego Peláez de Lermos, and had:
  - Julia Martinez Ullia married to Emilio Erasmo Morice BelmonteAntonia Peláez Vázquez de Coronado, married to Portuguese Sebastián (Sebastião) Pereira Cardoso, and had:
    - Josefa Morice Martinerz married to Alvaro Soto Estrada/Isabel Pereira Peláez, married to José Sandoval Ocampo, and had:
      - Ana Lorena Soto de Morice married to Mike Izadi/Inés Sandoval Pereira, married to José Guevara Maldonado, and had:
        - Anahita Izadi married to Guillermo Perez /Alvaro Guevara Sandoval, married to María Sáenz Vásquez, and had:
          - Ángela Guevara Sáenz, married to Pedro Alvarado Vidamartel, and had:
            - Pedro Alvarado Guevara, married to Manuela Baeza Baroto, and had:
              - Jacoba Alvarado Baeza, married to Francisco Carazo Soto, and had:
                - Lorenzo Carazo Alvarado, married to María del Rosario Aranda Muñoz, and had:
                  - Evaristo Carazo Aranda, 42nd President of Nicaragua

== Ancestors ==
Ancestors of Juan Vásquez de Coronado y Anaya

32. María Josefa Durán Muñoz
16. Juan Vázquez de Coronado y Monroy
33. Joseph Francisco Acuña Durán
8. Gonzalo Vázquez de Coronado y Rodríguez de Grado
34. Margarita Acuña Cervantes
17. Mari Hernández
35. Guadalupe Elizondo Acuña
4. Juan Vázquez de Coronado y Sosa de Ulloa
36. Marcelino Mora
18. Gonzalo Ruíz de Ulloa
37. Josefa Bonifasia Mora Barrientos
9. Catalina de Sosa y Ulloa
38. Isabel Ulloa Mora
19. Catalina de Sosa
39. Julia Martinez Ulloa
2. Gonzalo Vázquez de Coronado y Luján
40. Josefa Morice Martinez
20. Pedro de Luján
41. Elsa Ana Lorena Soto de Morice
10. Juan de Luján, el Bueno
42. Anahita Izadi
21. Isabel de Aponte
43. Carter Perez
5. Isabel de Luján
44. Charlotte Perez
22. Pedro de Luzón
11. María de Luzón
23. María Palomeque
1. Juan Vázquez de Coronado y Anaya
24.
12.
25.
6.
26.Conquistador Juan Vasquez de Cornoado
13.
27.Gonzalo Vázquez de Coronado y Arias Dávila
3. Catalina de Anaya
28.Gertrudis Andrea Vázquez de Coronado y Obando
14.
29.Juan Vázquez de Coronado y Peláez
7.
30. María Vázquez de Coronado y Madrigal
15.
31. Juan Durán Vázquez de Coronado
