= Ministry of Agriculture (El Salvador) =

Salvadorian government ministry

Ministry of Agriculture and Livestock
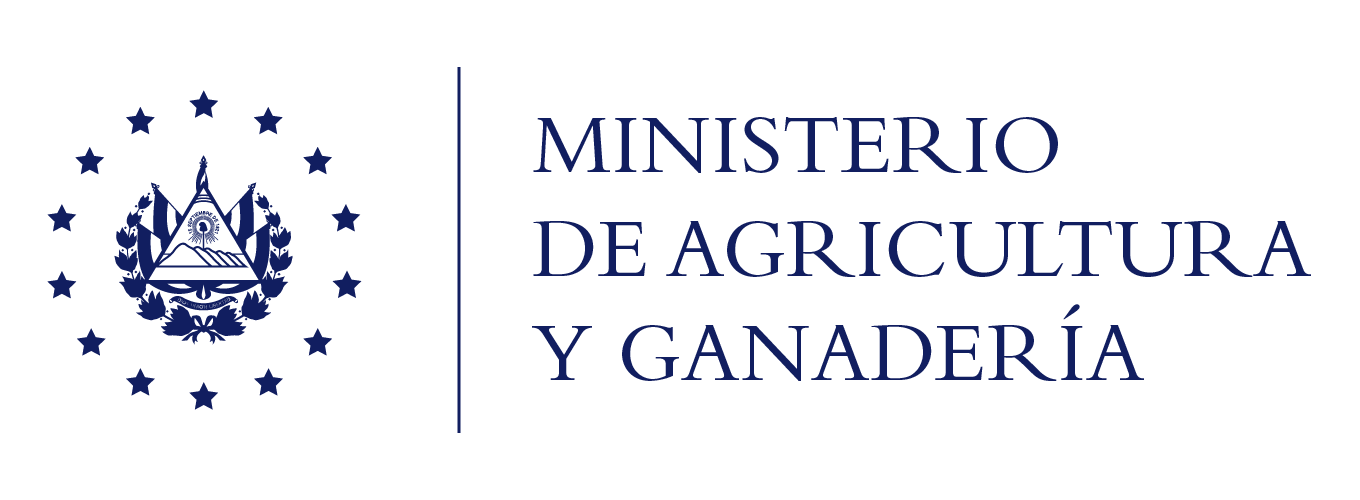

Agency overview
- Jurisdiction: El Salvador
- Headquarters: 1st North Avenue, 13th East Street and Manuel Gallardo Avenue, Santa Tecla, La Libertad, Republic of El Salvador, CA
- Minister responsible: Óscar Enrique Guardado Calderón
- Website: https://www.mag.gob.sv/

The Ministry of Agriculture and Livestock (Spanish: Ministerio de Agricultura y Ganadería) is a government ministry of El Salvador. It is the government institution responsible for formulating and implementing policies to support agricultural and livestock development.
