= Juan Carlos Bidegain Hananía =

Salvadoran politician

Juan Carlos Bidegain Hananía is an El Salvador politician who currently serves as Minister of the Interior in the Cabinet of Nayib Bukele.
