= Karla Trigueros =

Salvadoran military officer

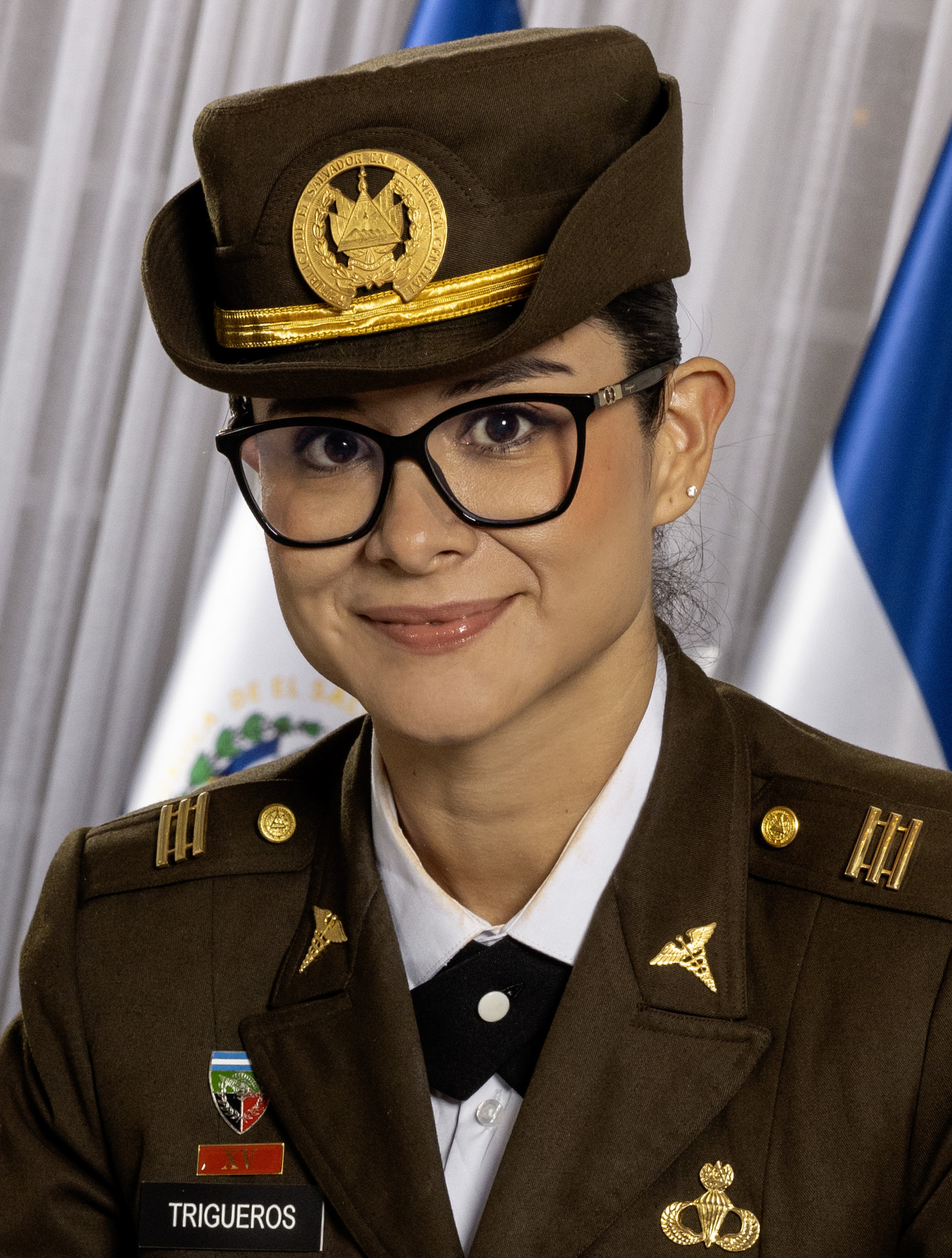
- Trigueros in 2025

Minister of Education, Science, and Technology of El Salvador
- Incumbent
- Assumed office 14 August 2025
- President: Nayib Bukele
- Preceded by: José Mauricio Pineda

Personal details
- Born: Karla Edith Trigueros; 28 April 1990 (age 36) Sonzacate, El Salvador
- Education: Captain General Gerardo Barrios Military School; Alberto Masferrer Salvadoran University
- Occupation: Military officer, physician

Military service
- Allegiance: El Salvador
- Branch/service: Salvadoran Army
- Years of service: 2007–present
- Rank: Captain

Karla Edith Trigueros is a Salvadoran military officer and physician who has served as the minister of education of El Salvador since 14 August 2025.

== Biography ==
Karla Edith Trigueros was born on 28 April 1990 in Sonzacate, El Salvador.

Trigueros enrolled in the Captain General Gerardo Barrios Military School in 2007. She also studied medicine at the Alberto Masferrer Salvadoran University. In her early career, Trigueros practiced medicine at the Central Military Hospital.

Trigueros was assigned to the Military Health Command (COSAM) in 2019. During the COVID-19 pandemic, Trigueros coordinated vaccination logistics within COSAM. She led the country's National Vaccination Plan in coordination with the Ministry of Health.

On 14 August 2025, Salvadoran president Nayib Bukele appointed Trigueros as El Salvador's Minister of Education, Science, and Technology, replacing José Mauricio Pineda.

== Awards and decorations ==
El Salvador

- 15 Year Service Ribbon

Political offices
Preceded by José Mauricio Pineda	Minister of Education, Science, and Technology of El Salvador; 2025–present	Incumbent
