= List of heads of state of El Salvador =

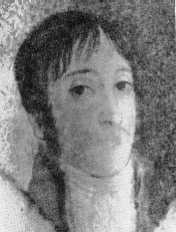
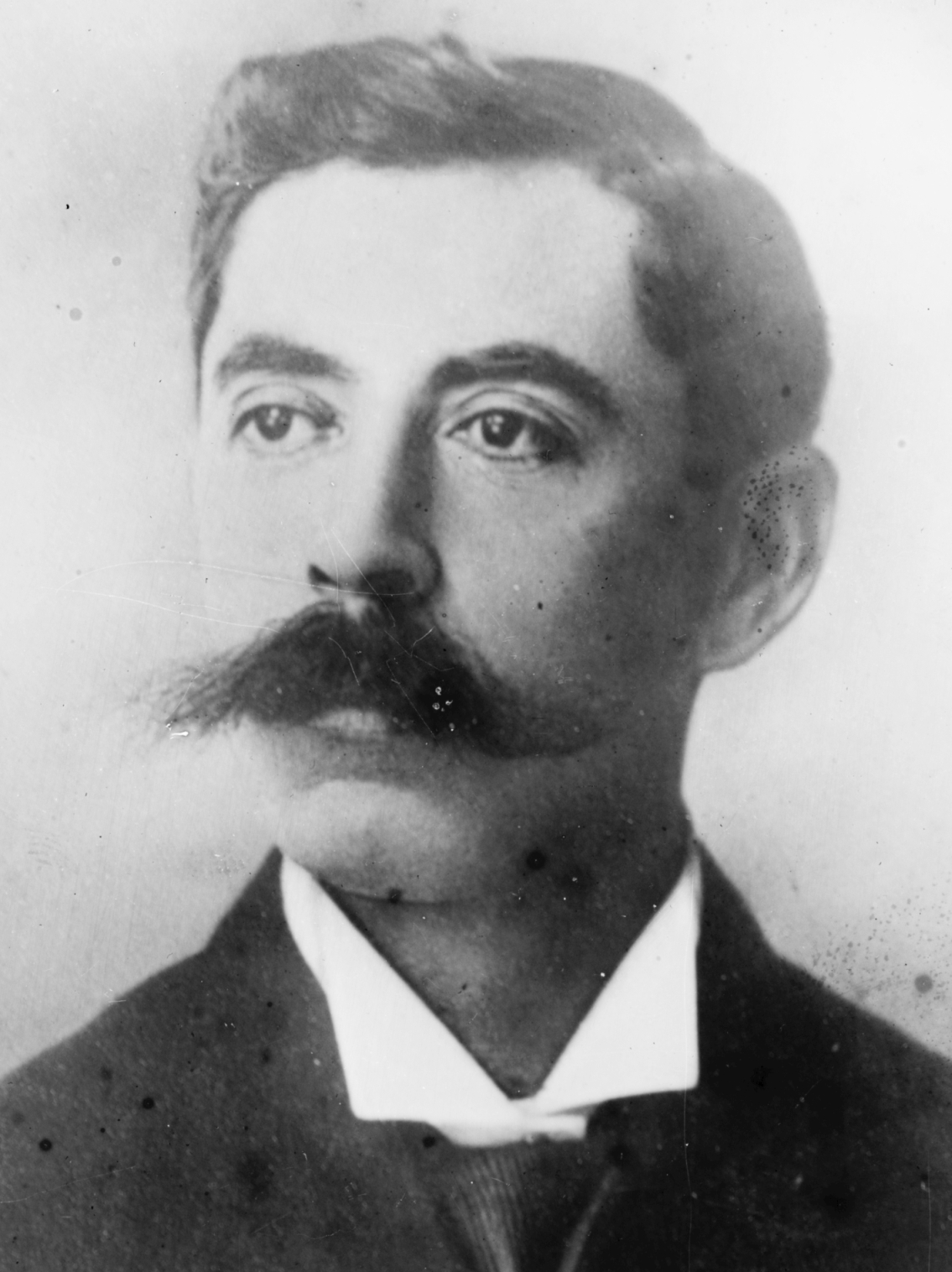
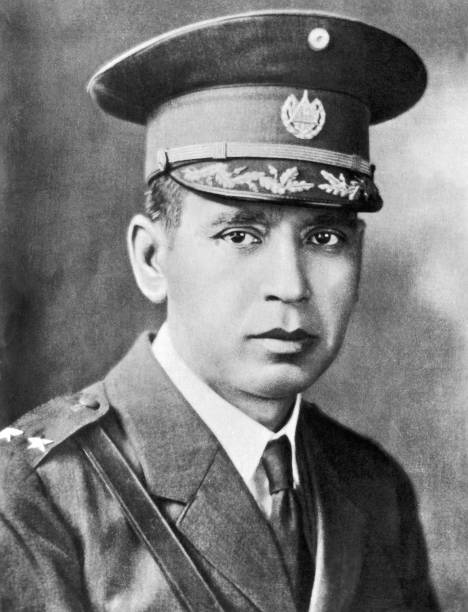
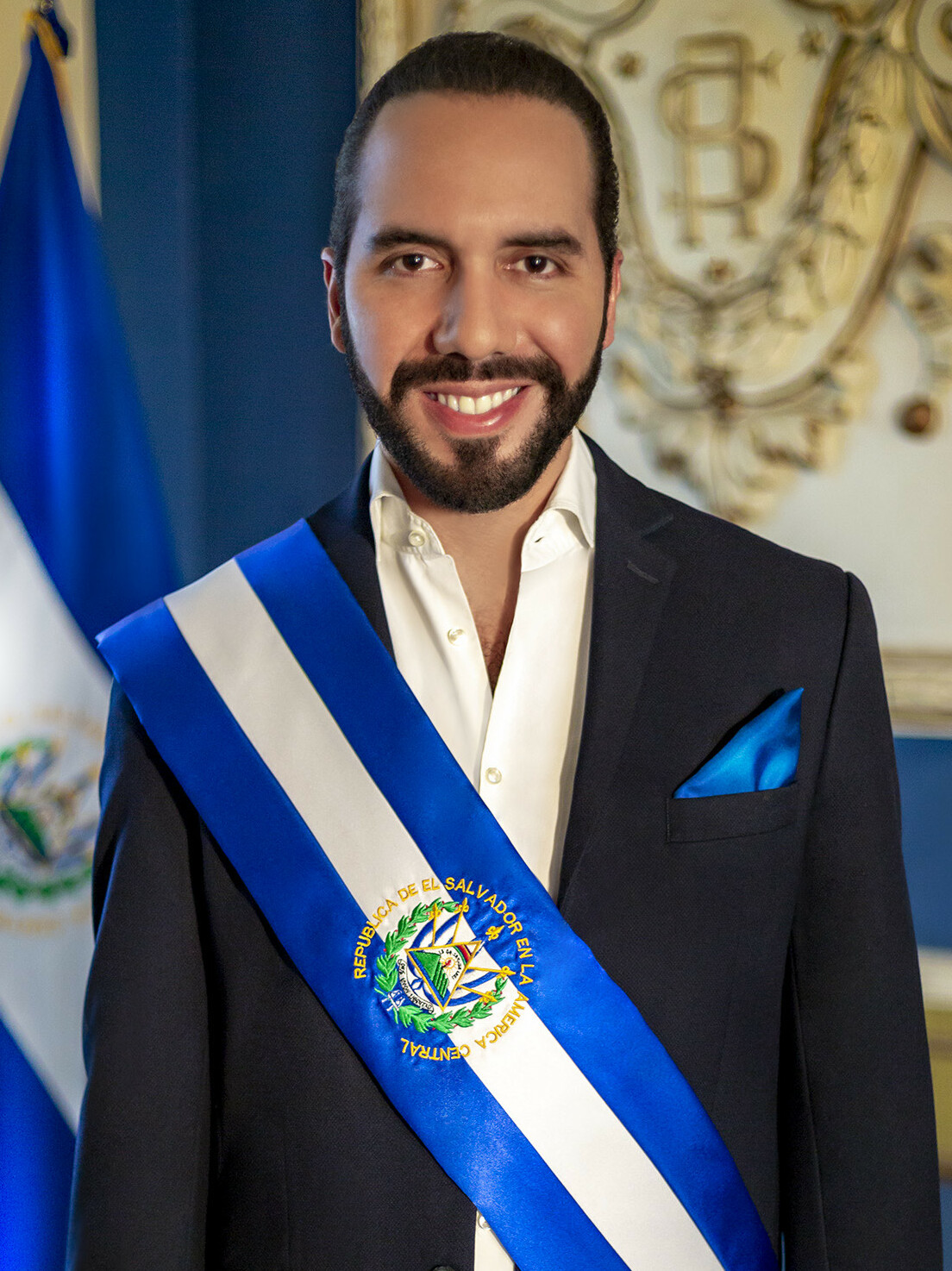
- Top left: Pedro Barriere, the first political chief of San Salvador
- Top right: Manuel Enrique Araujo, the only president of El Salvador to be assassinated in office
- Bottom left: Maximiliano Hernández Martínez, the longest serving president of El Salvador
- Bottom right: Nayib Bukele, the current president of El Salvador

The president of El Salvador is the head of state and head of government of the Republic of El Salvador. The office was established in 1821 as the political chief of San Salvador. From 1824 to 1841, the office was styled as head of state of El Salvador, which was then a province of the Federal Republic of Central America. After the federal republic's collapse, El Salvador became an independent country and its head of state was renamed to President.

== List ==
Political parties

Monarchist
Republican
Liberal
Conservative
National Democratic Party
Salvadoran Laborist Party
National Pro Patria Party
Unification Social Democratic Party
Revolutionary Party of Democratic Unification
National Conciliation Party
Democratic Action Party
Christian Democratic Party
Nationalist Republican Alliance
Grand Alliance for National Unity
Nuevas Ideas

Other affiliations

Military
Independent

Status

Denotes acting or provisional head of state

No.	Portrait	Name (Birth–Death)	Elected	Term of office			Political party	Vice President	Ref.
No.	Portrait	Name (Birth–Death)	Elected	Took office	Left office	Time in office	Political party	Vice President	Ref.
(El Salvador) Political Chief of San Salvador (1821–1824) (El Salvador)
1		Doctor; Pedro Barriere (1768–1827)	—	21 September 1821	28 November 1821	68 days	Monarchist	Office not established	
2		Doctor; José Matías Delgado (1767–1832)	—	28 November 1821	9 February 1823	1 year, 73 days	Republican	Office not established	
3		Brigadier; Vicente Filísola (1789–1850)	—	9 February 1823	7 May 1823	87 days	Monarchist/Military	Office not established	
4		General; Felipe Codallos (1790–1849)	—	7 May 1823	25 May 1823	18 days	Monarchist/Military	Office not established	
–		Consultive Junta	—	25 May 1823	17 June 1823	23 days	Republican/Military	Office not established	
–		Mariano Prado (1776–1837); Provisional Political Chief	—	17 June 1823	22 April 1824	310 days	Republican/Liberal	Office not established	
Head of State of the State of El Salvador (1824–1841)
1		Juan Manuel Rodríguez (1771–1847)	—	22 April 1824	1 October 1824	162 days	Independent	Office not established	
2		Mariano Prado (1776–1837)	—	1 October 1824	13 December 1824	73 days	Liberal	Office not established	
3		Juan Vicente Villacorta (1764–1828)	—	13 December 1824	1 November 1826	1 year, 323 days	Liberal	Mariano Prado	
–		Mariano Prado (1776–1837); Acting Head of State	—	1 November 1826	30 January 1829	2 years, 90 days	Liberal	Mariano Prado	
4		José María Cornejo (1788–1864)	1829	30 January 1829	16 February 1830	1 year, 17 days	Conservative	José Damián Villacorta	
–		José Damián Villacorta (1796–1860); Acting Head of State	—	16 February 1830	4 December 1830	291 days	Independent	José Damián Villacorta	
4		José María Cornejo (1788–1864)	—	4 December 1830	3 April 1832	1 year, 121 days	Conservative	José Damián Villacorta	
–		General; Francisco Morazán (1792–1842); Provisional Head of State	—	3 April 1832	13 May 1832	40 days	Liberal/Military	Colonel; Joaquín de San Martín	
5		Colonel; Joaquín de San Martín (1770–1854)	—	13 May 1832	25 July 1832	73 days	Liberal/Military	Office vacant	
6		Mariano Prado (1776–1837)	1832	25 July 1832	1 July 1833	341 days	Liberal	Colonel; Joaquín de San Martín	
7		Colonel; Joaquín de San Martín (1770–1854)	1833	1 July 1833	23 June 1834	357 days	Liberal/Military	Colonel; Lorenzo González	
–		General; Carlos Salazar Castro (1800–1867); Provisional Head of State	—	23 June 1834	13 July 1834	20 days	Military	Office vacant	
–		José Gregorio Salazar (1773–1838); Provisional Head of State	—	13 July 1834	30 September 1834	79 days	Independent	Office vacant	
–		Joaquín Escolán y Balibrera (?–?); Provisional Head of State	—	30 September 1834	14 October 1834	14 days	Independent	José María Silva	
–		José María Silva (1804–1876); Acting Head of State	—	14 October 1834	2 March 1835	139 days	Independent	José María Silva	
–		Joaquín Escolán y Balibrera (?–?); Acting Head of State	—	2 March 1835	10 April 1835	39 days	Independent	Office vacant	
8		General; Nicolás Espinoza (1795–1845)	1835	10 April 1835	15 November 1835	219 days	Liberal/Military	José María Silva	
–		Colonel; Francisco Gómez (1796–1838); Acting Head of State	—	15 November 1835	1 February 1836	78 days	Independent/Military	Office vacant	
9		Diego Vigil (1799–1845)	—	1 February 1836	23 May 1837	1 year, 111 days	Liberal	Timoteo Menéndez	
–		Timoteo Menéndez (?–?); Acting Head of State	—	23 May 1837	7 June 1837	15 days	Independent	Timoteo Menéndez	
9		Diego Vigil (1799–1845)	—	7 June 1837	6 January 1838	213 days	Liberal	Timoteo Menéndez	
–		Timoteo Menéndez (?–?); Acting Head of State	—	6 January 1838	23 May 1839	1 year, 137 days	Independent	Timoteo Menéndez	
–		Colonel; Antonio José Cañas (1785–1844); Acting Head of State	—	23 May 1839	11 July 1839	49 days	Military	Office vacant	
10		General; Francisco Morazán (1792–1842)	—	11 July 1839	16 February 1840	40 days	Liberal/Military	José María Silva	
–		José María Silva (1804–1876); Acting Head of State	—	16 February 1840	5 April 1840	49 days	Independent	José María Silva	
–		Municipal Council of San Salvador	—	5 April 1840	7 April 1840	2 days	Independent	Office vacant	
–		Colonel; Antonio José Cañas (1785–1844); Acting Head of State	—	7 April 1840	20 September 1840	166 days	Military	Office vacant	
–		Norberto Ramírez (1802–1856); Acting Head of State	—	20 September 1840	7 January 1841	109 days	Independent	Office vacant	
–		Juan Lindo (1790–1857); Provisional Head of State	—	7 January 1841	30 January 1841	23 days	Conservative	Pedro José Arce	
President of the Republic of El Salvador (Count Resets: 1841–present)
–		Juan Lindo (1790–1857); Provisional President	—	30 January 1841	20 June 1841	141 days	Conservative	Pedro José Arce	
–		Pedro José Arce (1801–1871); Acting President	—	20 June 1841	28 June 1841	8 days	Independent	Pedro José Arce	
1		Juan Lindo (1790–1857)	—	28 June 1841	1 February 1842	218 days	Conservative	Pedro José Arce	
–		General; José Escolástico Marín (?–1846); Acting President	—	1 February 1842	12 April 1842	70 days	Military	Office vacant	
2		General; Juan José Guzmán (1797–1847)	—	12 April 1842	30 June 1842	79 days	Conservative/Military	Pedro José Arce	
–		Dionisio Villacorta (?–1846); Acting President	—	30 June 1842	19 July 1842	19 days	Independent	Pedro José Arce	
–		General; José Escolástico Marín (?–1846); Acting President	—	19 July 1842	26 September 1842	69 days	Military	Pedro José Arce	
2		General; Juan José Guzmán (1797–1847)	—	26 September 1842	26 January 1843	122 days	Conservative/Military	Pedro José Arce	
–		Pedro José Arce (1801–1871); Acting President	—	26 January 1843	8 March 1843	41 days	Independent	Pedro José Arce	
2		General; Juan José Guzmán (1797–1847)	—	8 March 1843	31 January 1844	329 days	Conservative/Military	Pedro José Arce	
–		Fermín Palacios (?–?); Acting President	—	1 February 1844	7 February 1844	6 days	Independent	Office vacant	
3		General; Francisco Malespín (1806–1846)	1844	7 February 1844	9 May 1844	92 days	Conservative/Military	Luis Ayala	
3		General; Francisco Malespín (1806–1846)	1844	7 February 1844	9 May 1844	92 days	Conservative/Military	General; Joaquín Eufrasio Guzmán	
–		General; Joaquín Eufrasio Guzmán (1801–1875); Acting President	—	9 May 1844	16 June 1844	38 days	Conservative	General; Joaquín Eufrasio Guzmán	
3		General; Francisco Malespín (1806–1846)	—	16 June 1844	25 October 1844	131 days	Conservative/Military	General; Joaquín Eufrasio Guzmán	
–		General; Joaquín Eufrasio Guzmán (1801–1875); Acting President	—	25 October 1844	16 February 1845	114 days	Conservative	General; Joaquín Eufrasio Guzmán	
–		Fermín Palacios (?–?); Acting President	—	16 February 1845	25 April 1845	68 days	Independent	General; Joaquín Eufrasio Guzmán	
–		General; Joaquín Eufrasio Guzmán (1801–1875); Acting President	—	25 April 1845	1 February 1846	282 days	Conservative	General; Joaquín Eufrasio Guzmán	
–		Fermín Palacios (?–?); Acting President	—	1 February 1846	21 February 1846	20 days	Independent	Office vacant	
4		Doctor; Eugenio Aguilar (1804–1879)	1846	21 February 1846	12 July 1846	141 days	Liberal	José Campo y Pomar	
–		Fermín Palacios (?–?); Acting President	—	12 July 1846	21 July 1846	9 days	Independent	José Campo y Pomar	
4		Doctor; Eugenio Aguilar (1804–1879)	—	21 July 1846	1 February 1848	1 year, 195 days	Liberal	José Campo y Pomar	
–		Tomás Medina (1803–1884); Acting President	—	1 February 1848	3 February 1848	2 days	Independent	Office vacant	
–		José Félix Quirós (1811–1883); Acting President	—	3 February 1848	7 February 1848	4 days	Independent	José Félix Quirós	
5		Doroteo Vasconcelos (1803–1883)	1848	7 February 1848	26 January 1850	1 year, 353 days	Liberal	José Félix Quirós	
–		Ramón Rodríguez (1803–1884); Acting President	—	26 January 1850	1 February 1850	6 days	Independent	José Félix Quirós	
–		José Félix Quirós (1811–1883); Acting President	—	1 February 1850	4 February 1850	3 days	Independent	José Félix Quirós	
5		Doroteo Vasconcelos (1803–1883)	1850	4 February 1850	12 January 1851	342 days	Liberal	José Félix Quirós	
–		Francisco Dueñas (1810–1884); Acting President	—	12 January 1851	19 March 1851	66 days	Conservative	José Félix Quirós	
–		José Félix Quirós (1811–1883); Acting President	—	19 March 1851	3 May 1851	45 days	Independent	José Félix Quirós	
–		Francisco Dueñas (1810–1884); Acting President	—	3 May 1851	30 January 1852	272 days	Conservative	José Félix Quirós	
–		Colonel; José María San Martín (1811–1857); Acting President	—	30 January 1852	1 February 1852	2 days	Conservative/Military	José Félix Quirós	
6		Francisco Dueñas (1810–1884)	1852	1 February 1852	1 February 1854	2 years, 0 days	Conservative	Tomás Medina	
–		Vicente Gómez (?–?); Acting President	—	1 February 1854	15 February 1854	14 days	Independent	General; José Mariano Hernández	
7		Colonel; José María San Martín (1811–1857)	1854	15 February 1854	26 September 1854	223 days	Conservative/Military	General; José Mariano Hernández	
–		General; José Mariano Hernández (1786–1864); Acting President	—	26 September 1854	13 November 1854	48 days	Conservative/Military	General; José Mariano Hernández	
7		Colonel; José María San Martín (1811–1857)	—	13 November 1854	1 February 1856	1 year, 80 days	Conservative/Military	General; José Mariano Hernández	
–		Francisco Dueñas (1810–1884); Acting President	—	1 February 1856	12 February 1856	11 days	Conservative	Francisco Dueñas	
8		Rafael Campo (1813–1890)	1856	12 February 1856	12 May 1856	90 days	Conservative	Francisco Dueñas	
–		Francisco Dueñas (1810–1884); Acting President	—	12 May 1856	19 July 1856	68 days	Conservative	Francisco Dueñas	
8		Rafael Campo (1813–1890)	—	19 July 1856	1 February 1858	1 year, 197 days	Conservative	Francisco Dueñas	
–		Lorenzo Zepeda (?–?); Acting President	—	1 February 1858	7 February 1858	6 days	Independent	Office vacant	
9		General; Miguel Santín del Castillo (1830–1880)	1858	7 February 1858	24 June 1858	137 days	Conservative	General; Joaquín Eufrasio Guzmán	
–		Captain General; Gerardo Barrios (1813–1865); Acting President	—	24 June 1858	16 September 1858	84 days	Liberal	General; Joaquín Eufrasio Guzmán	
9		General; Miguel Santín del Castillo (1830–1880)	—	16 September 1858	19 January 1859	125 days	Conservative	General; Joaquín Eufrasio Guzmán	
–		General; Joaquín Eufrasio Guzmán (1801–1875); Acting President	—	19 January 1859	15 February 1859	27 days	Conservative	General; Joaquín Eufrasio Guzmán	
–		José María Peralta (1807–1883); Acting President	—	15 February 1859	12 March 1859	25 days	Independent	Office vacant	
–		Captain General; Gerardo Barrios (1813–1865); Acting President	—	12 March 1859	1 February 1860	326 days	Liberal	Office vacant	
10		Captain General; Gerardo Barrios (1813–1865)	1859	1 February 1860	16 December 1860	319 days	Liberal	José Félix Quirós	
–		José María Peralta (1807–1883); Acting President	—	16 December 1860	7 February 1861	53 days	Independent	José Félix Quirós	
10		Captain General; Gerardo Barrios (1813–1865)	—	7 February 1861	26 October 1863	2 years, 261 days	Liberal	José Félix Quirós	
–		Francisco Dueñas (1810–1884); Provisional President	—	26 October 1863	1 February 1865	1 year, 98 days	Conservative	Office vacant	
11		Francisco Dueñas (1810–1884)	1864; 1869	1 February 1865	12 April 1871	6 years, 70 days	Conservative	Gregorio Arbizú	
11		Francisco Dueñas (1810–1884)	1864; 1869	1 February 1865	12 April 1871	6 years, 70 days	Conservative	José María Parrilla	
–		Marshal; Santiago González (1818–1887); Provisional President	—	12 April 1871	1 February 1872	295 days	Liberal/Military	Office vacant	
12		Marshal; Santiago González (1818–1887)	1872	1 February 1872	10 May 1872	99 days	Liberal/Military	Manuel Méndez	
–		Manuel Méndez (?–1872); Acting President	—	10 May 1872	9 July 1872	122 days	Independent	Manuel Méndez	
12		Marshal; Santiago González (1818–1887)	—	9 July 1872	1 February 1876	3 years, 145 days	Liberal/Military	Office vacant	
13		Andrés del Valle (1833–1888)	Jan. 1876	1 February 1876	1 May 1876	90 days	Liberal	Santiago González	
–		Doctor; Rafael Zaldívar (1837–1903); Provisional President	—	1 May 1876	1 February 1880	3 years, 276 days	Liberal	Office vacant	
14		Doctor; Rafael Zaldívar (1837–1903)	Jun. 1876	1 February 1880	6 April 1884	4 years, 65 days	Liberal	Office vacant	
–		Ángel Guirola (1826–1910); Acting President	—	6 April 1884	21 August 1884	137 days	Independent	Office vacant	
14		Doctor; Rafael Zaldívar (1834–1903)	—	21 August 1884	14 May 1885	266 days	Liberal	Office vacant	
–		General; Fernando Figueroa (1849–1919); Provisional President	—	14 May 1885	18 June 1885	35 days	Liberal/Military	Office vacant	
–		José Rosales (1827–1891); Acting President	—	18 June 1885	22 June 1885	4 days	Independent	Office vacant	
–		Divisional General; Francisco Menéndez (1830–1890); Provisional President	—	22 June 1885	1 March 1887	1 year, 252 days	Liberal/Military	Office vacant	
15		Divisional General; Francisco Menéndez (1830–1890)	1887	1 March 1887	22 June 1890	3 years, 113 days	Liberal/Military	Office vacant	
–		General; Carlos Ezeta (1852–1903); Provisional President	—	22 June 1890	1 March 1891	252 days	Liberal/Military	Office vacant	
16		General; Carlos Ezeta (1852–1903)	1891	1 March 1891	10 June 1894	3 years, 101 days	Liberal/Military	General; Antonio Ezeta	
–		General; Rafael Antonio Gutiérrez (1845–1921); Provisional President	—	10 June 1894	1 March 1895	264 days	Liberal/Military	Office vacant	
17		General; Rafael Antonio Gutiérrez (1845–1921)	1895	1 March 1895	14 November 1898	3 years, 258 days	Liberal/Military	Prudencio Alfaro	
–		General; Tomás Regalado (1861–1906); Provisional President	—	14 November 1898	1 March 1899	107 days	Liberal/Military	Office vacant	
18		General; Tomás Regalado (1861–1906)	1899	1 March 1899	1 March 1903	4 years, 0 days	Liberal/Military	Francisco Reyes	
19		General; Pedro José Escalón (1847–1923)	1903	1 March 1903	1 March 1907	4 years, 0 days	Liberal/Military	Calixto Velado Eduardo	
20		Divisional General; Fernando Figueroa (1849–1919)	1907	1 March 1907	1 March 1911	4 years, 0 days	Liberal/Military	Manuel Enrique Araujo	
21		Doctor; Manuel Enrique Araujo (1865–1913)	1911	1 March 1911	9 February 1913	1 year, 345 days	Liberal	Onofre Durán Santillana	
–		Carlos Meléndez (1861–1919); Provisional President	—	9 February 1913	29 August 1914	1 year, 201 days	Liberal	Office vacant	
–		Doctor; Alfonso Quiñónez Molina (1874–1950); Provisional President	—	29 August 1914	1 March 1915	184 days	Liberal	Office vacant	
22		Carlos Meléndez (1861–1919)	1915	1 March 1915	21 December 1918	3 years, 295 days	Liberal	Alfonso Quiñónez Molina	
–		Doctor; Alfonso Quiñónez Molina (1874–1950); Provisional President	—	21 December 1918	1 March 1919	70 days	National Democratic Party	Office vacant	
23		Jorge Meléndez (1871–1953)	1919	1 March 1919	1 March 1923	4 years, 0 days	National Democratic Party	Alfonso Quiñónez Molina	
24		Doctor; Alfonso Quiñónez Molina (1874–1950)	1923	1 March 1923	1 March 1927	4 years, 0 days	National Democratic Party	Pío Romero Bosque	
25		Doctor; Pío Romero Bosque (1860–1935)	1927	1 March 1927	1 March 1931	4 years, 0 days	National Democratic Party Independent	Gustavo Vides	
26		Arturo Araujo (1878–1967)	1931	1 March 1931	2 December 1931	276 days	Salvadoran Laborist Party	Brigadier General; Maximiliano Hernández Martínez	
–		Civic Directory	—	2 December 1931	4 December 1931	2 days	Military	Brigadier General; Maximiliano Hernández Martínez	
–		Brigadier General; Maximiliano Hernández Martínez (1882–1966); Provisional President	—	4 December 1931	28 August 1934	2 years, 267 days	Military National Pro Patria Party/Military	Brigadier General; Maximiliano Hernández Martínez	
–		Brigadier General; Andrés Ignacio Menéndez (1879–1962); Provisional President	—	28 August 1934	1 March 1935	185 days	National Pro Patria; Party/Military	Office vacant	
27		Brigadier General; Maximiliano Hernández Martínez (1882–1966)	1935; 1939; 1944	1 March 1935	9 May 1944	9 years, 69 days	National Pro Patria; Party/Military	Office vacant	
–		Brigadier General; Andrés Ignacio Menéndez (1879–1962); Provisional President	—	9 May 1944	21 October 1944	165 days	National Pro Patria; Party/Military	Office vacant	
–		Colonel; Osmín Aguirre y Salinas (1889–1977); Provisional President	—	21 October 1944	1 March 1945	131 days	Military	Office vacant	
28		General; Salvador Castaneda Castro (1888–1965)	1945	1 March 1945	14 December 1948	3 years, 288 days	Unification Social Democratic; Party/Military	Manuel Adriano Vilanova	
–		Revolutionary Council of Government	—	14 December 1948	14 September 1950	1 year, 274 days	Military	Office vacant	
29		Lieutenant Colonel; Óscar Osorio (1910–1969)	1950	14 September 1950	14 September 1956	6 years, 0 days	Revolutionary Party of Democratic Unification/Military	José María Peralta	
30		Lieutenant Colonel; José María Lemus (1911–1993)	1956	14 September 1956	26 October 1960	4 years, 42 days	Revolutionary Party of Democratic Unification/Military	Humberto Costa	
–		Junta of Government	—	26 October 1960	25 January 1961	91 days	Military	Office vacant	
–		Civic-Military Directory	—	25 January 1961	25 January 1962	1 year, 0 days	Military	Office vacant	
–		Doctor; Eusebio Rodolfo Cordón Cea (1899–1966); Provisional President	—	25 January 1962	1 July 1962	157 days	Independent	Office vacant	
31		Lieutenant Colonel; Julio Adalberto Rivera (1921–1973)	1962	1 July 1962	1 July 1967	5 years, 0 days	National Conciliation; Party/Military	Francisco Roberto Lima	
32		General; Fidel Sánchez Hernández (1917–2003)	1967	1 July 1967	1 July 1972	5 years, 0 days	National Conciliation; Party/Military	Humberto Guillermo Cuestas	
33		Colonel; Arturo Armando Molina (1927–2021)	1972	1 July 1972	1 July 1977	5 years, 0 days	National Conciliation; Party/Military	Enrique Mayorga Rivas	
34		General; Carlos Humberto Romero (1924–2017)	1977	1 July 1977	15 October 1979	2 years, 106 days	National Conciliation; Party/Military	Julio Astacio	
–		Revolutionary Government Junta	—	15 October 1979	2 May 1982	2 years, 199 days	Military	Office vacant	
35		Doctor; Álvaro Magaña (1925–2001)	1982	2 May 1982	1 June 1984	2 years, 30 days	Democratic Action Party	Raúl Molina Martínez	
35		Doctor; Álvaro Magaña (1925–2001)	1982	2 May 1982	1 June 1984	2 years, 30 days	Democratic Action Party	Mauricio Gutiérrez Castro	
35		Doctor; Álvaro Magaña (1925–2001)	1982	2 May 1982	1 June 1984	2 years, 30 days	Democratic Action Party	Pablo Mauricio Alvergue	
36		José Napoleón Duarte (1925–1990)	1984	1 June 1984	1 June 1989	5 years, 0 days	Christian Democratic Party	Rodolfo Castillo	
37		Alfredo Cristiani (born 1947)	1989	1 June 1989	1 June 1994	5 years, 0 days	Nationalist Republican; Alliance	José Francisco Merino	
38		Doctor; Armando Calderón Sol (1948–2017)	1994	1 June 1994	1 June 1999	5 years, 0 days	Nationalist Republican; Alliance	Enrique Borgo Bustamante	
39		Francisco Flores Pérez (1959–2016)	1999	1 June 1999	1 June 2004	5 years, 0 days	Nationalist Republican; Alliance	Carlos Quintanilla Schmidt	
40		Antonio Saca (born 1965)	2004	1 June 2004	1 June 2009	5 years, 0 days	Nationalist Republican; Alliance	Ana Vilma de Escobar	
41		Mauricio Funes (1959–2025)	2009	1 June 2009	1 June 2014	5 years, 0 days	Farabundo Martí National; Liberation Front	Salvador Sánchez Cerén	
42		Salvador Sánchez Cerén (born 1944)	2014	1 June 2014	1 June 2019	5 years, 0 days	Farabundo Martí National; Liberation Front	Óscar Ortiz	
43		Nayib Bukele (born 1981)	2019; 2024	1 June 2019	Incumbent	7 years, 170 days	Grand Alliance for National Unity Nuevas Ideas	Félix Ulloa	
–		Claudia Rodríguez de Guevara (born 1980/1981); Acting President	—	1 December 2023	1 June 2024	183 days	Nuevas Ideas	Félix Ulloa	

== Timeline ==
The following timeline visualizes the presidencies of El Salvador since 1821.
