= 1829 Salvadoran gubernatorial election =

22 January 1829	1832 →
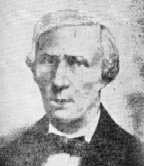

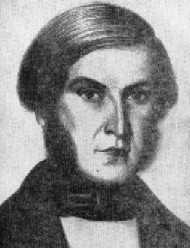
Candidate	José María Cornejo	Mariano Prado
Party	Conservative	Liberal
Running mate	Nicolás Espinoza
Governor before election
Mariano Prado (acting)
Liberal
Elected Governor
José María Cornejo
Conservative

Gubernatorial elections were held in El Salvador (then a part of the Federal Republic of Central America) on 22 January 1829. Conservative José María Cornejo defeated incumbent liberal governor Mariano Prado. Cornejo assumed office on 30 January 1829.

== Results ==
Candidate	Party
José María Cornejo	Conservative
Mariano Prado	Liberal
Total
Source: University of California, San Diego
