= Manuel Aguilar y Bustamante =

Salvadoran ecclesiastic

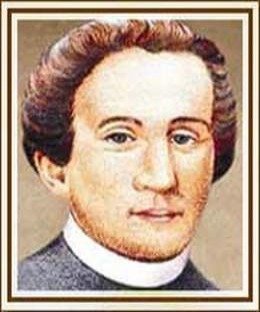
Manuel Aguilar y Bustamante

Manuel Aguilar y Bustamante (26 June 1750 – 25 May 1819) was a Salvadoran ecclesiastic and revolutionary against the Spanish Empire who participated in the 1811 Independence Movement and the 1814 Independence Movement.

== Ecclesiastical career ==
In 1761 Aguilar entered the school of San Francisco de Borja in Antigua Guatemala graduating in philosophy in 1772. Through further study he became a sub-deacon in 1776 and a deacon in 1778. Thereafter he was appointed the curate of Zacatecoluca.

== Participation in independence efforts ==
On 5 November 1811 in San Salvador, the supporters of independence organized the beginning of a liberation movement. Participants included doctors such as Santiago José Celis, the priests and brothers Nicholas, Vicente and Manuel Aguilar, and the priest José Matías Delgado. Others included Manuel José Arce, Juan Manuel Rodríguez and Pedro Pablo Castillo. Many of the participants were linked by family ties. After the insurrection failed, Manuel Aguilar was imprisoned from October 1811 until 4 March 1813.

As part of the second independence movement in 1814 Manuel Aguilar preached a sermon thanking the people for having asked for their freedom during the first rising in 1811. Unsurprisingly the sermon was unpopular with the Spanish authorities.

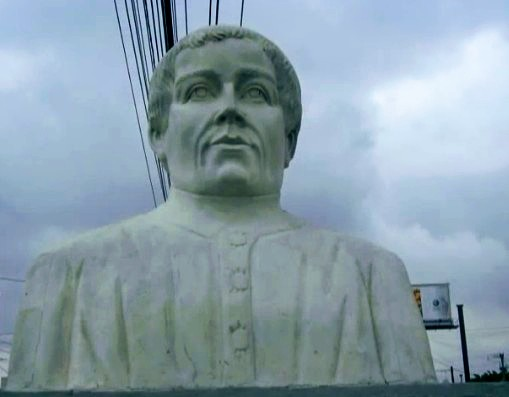
Bust of Manuel in San Salvador.
