= Villacorta =

Spanish surname

Villacorta is a Spanish surname.

== Name and history ==
Spelling variations of this family surname include Villacreses, Villacrecis, and Villacrusis. It was first found in León, in Northwest Spain, the chief village being Villacorta and ancient pre-Ancient Leonese town. Some of the first settlers of this family name were: Andres de Villacorta, who arrived in America in 1812, and Diego de Villacorta, who landed in America in 1814.

This Spanish surname Villacorta is such a name literally meaning one who came from a villa which was a Spanish habitation name from any of the numerous places so called, which acquired their name from the Spanish villa or (settlement). Corta was a nickname which was derived from etiquette from the Latin word quorte meaning "barn". Surnames as we know them today were first assumed in Europe from the 11th to the 15th Century. The employment in the use of a second name was a custom that was first introduced from the Normans. They themselves had not long before adopted them. It became, in course of time, a mark of gentler blood, and it was deemed a disgrace for gentlemen to have but one single name, as the meaner sort had. At first the coat of arms was a practical matter which served a function on the battlefield and in tournaments. With his helmet or armet covering his face, and plate armour encasing the knight from head to foot, the only means of identification for his followers, was the insignia painted on his shield and embroidered on his surcoat, the flowing and draped garment worn over the armour.

Over the centuries, most people in Europe have accepted their surname as a fact of life, as irrevocable as an act of God. However much the individual may have liked or disliked the surname, they were stuck with it, and people rarely changed them by personal choice. A more common form of variation was in fact involuntary, when an official change was made, in other words, a clerical error. Among the humbler classes of European society, and especially among illiterate people, individuals were willing to accept the mistakes of officials, clerks and priests as officially bestowing a new version of their surname, just as they had meekly accepted the surname they had been born with. In North America, Anglicization may have occurred when some families decided to change their name.

A family member worth mentioning and that of early found records is that of Francisco Enríquez de Villacorta, (1616) Son of Don Diego de Villacorta and Lady Isabel Enríquez. He studied medicine at the University of Alcala founded in 1499, and located in Alcalá de Henares northeast of Madrid in Spain, and received a PhD in 1641. As holder of the chair of Prima, he was later the main figure of the university health during the third quarter of the seventeenth century. He married on March 29, 1655, to Hipólita Hidalgo de Quintanilla, with whom he had three children. From 1664 and then on he was a doctor in Camera Real. There is also the wife of Cristobal Ponce de Leon, Beatriz Sarmiento de Villacorta (estimated before-1594) in Olmedo, Valladolid, Spain, mother of Baltasar Ponce de Leon Sarmiento born in (c-1514) in Ocana y Olmedo, Seville, Spain.

The Villacorta family, last name from Aragon, repeatedly proved their nobility in the Royal Chancery of Valladolid. Their family coat of arms or crest is described as the color blue or azure, and nine car wheels of gold, per Spanish noble or Nobiliario Español, Don Julio de Atienza, Pág. 760, Madrid, 1959.

== People with the surname ==
- Juan Vicente Villacorta (1764–1828), Central American politician, head of state of El Salvador while it was a state of the Central American Federation
- José Damián Villacorta (1796–1860), Salvadoran lawyer and politician
- Alonso Mercado y Villacorta, Spanish civil servant, acting in the Río de la Plata area
- Eduardo Orrego Villacorta (1933–1994), Peruvian architect and politician
- Viviana Villacorta (born 1999), American soccer player

== Gallery ==
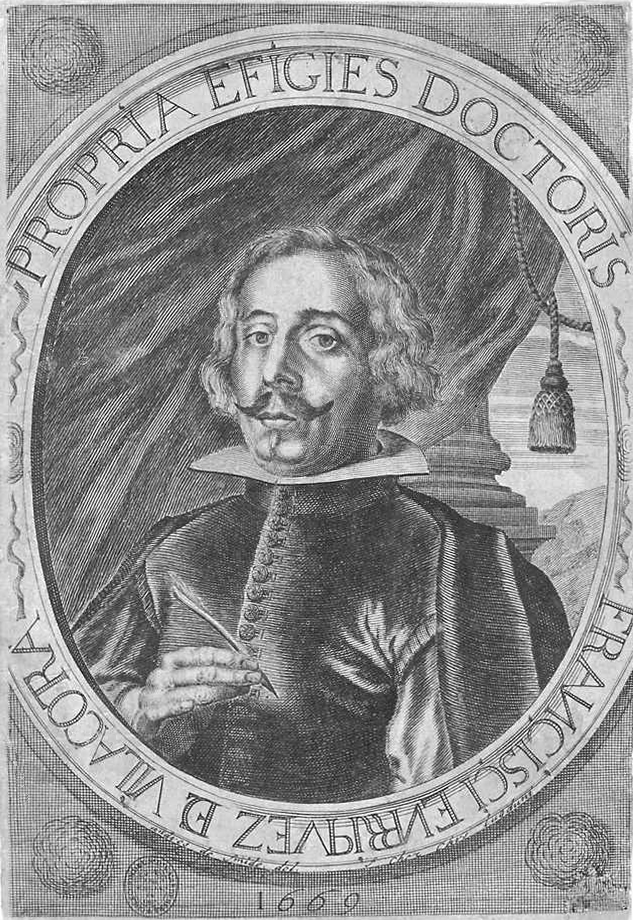
Francisco Enríquez Villacorta (1616–1680) Spanish doctor, professor at the University of Alcalá.

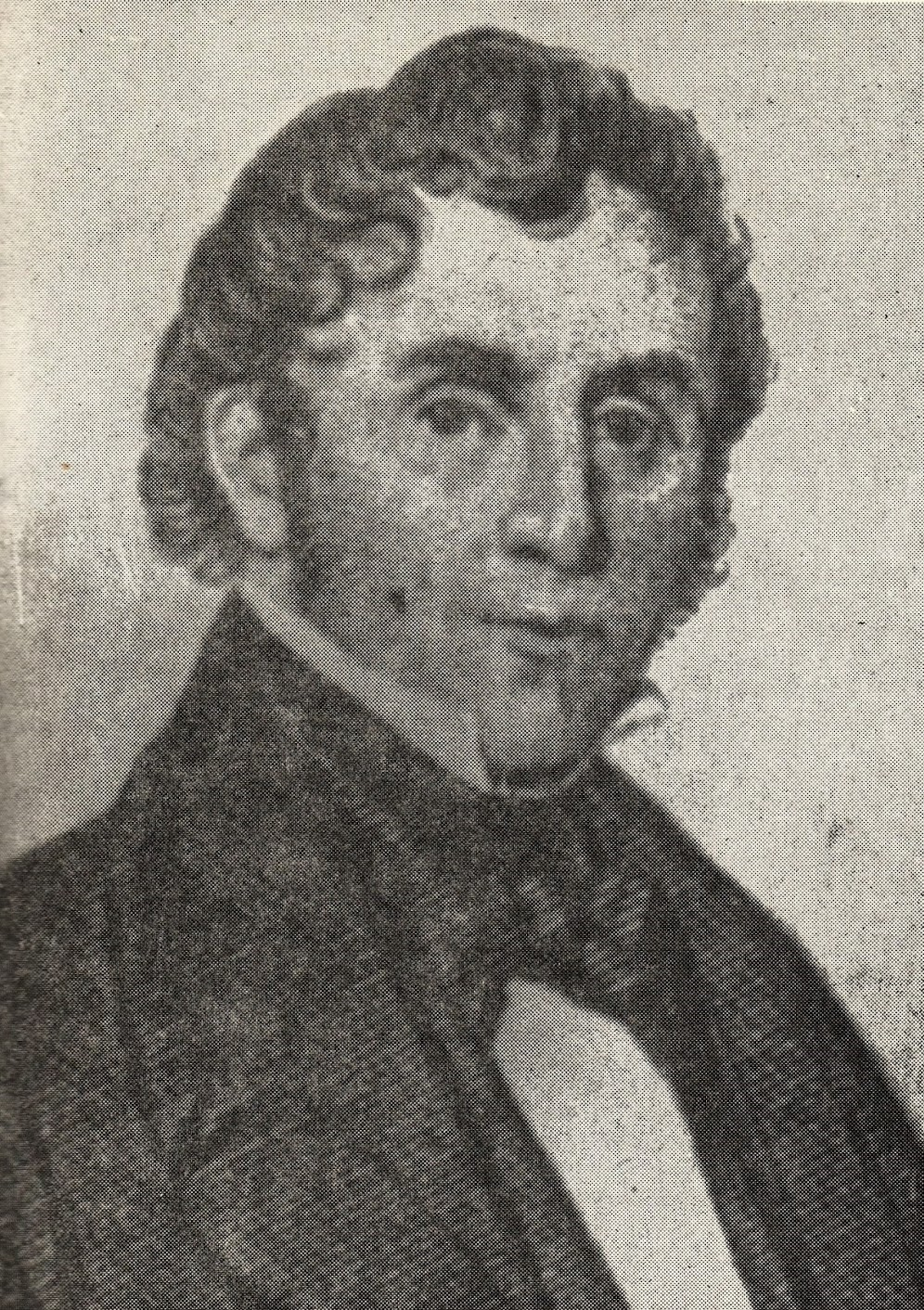
Juan Vicente Villacorta (1764–1828) Central American politician, member of the Federal Central American triumatives.

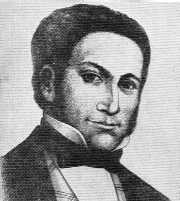
José Damián Villacorta (1796–1860) Salvadoran lawyer and politician, acting Supreme Chief of El Salvador.

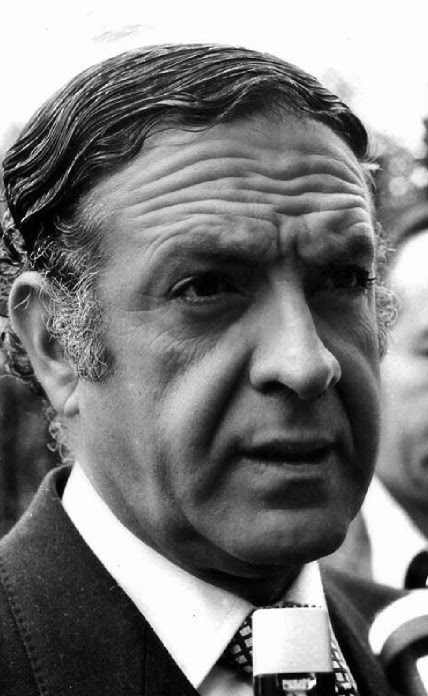
Eduardo Orrego Villacorta (1933–1994) Peruvian architect and politician, mayor of Lima.
