= Nicolás Espinoza =

Head of state of El Salvador

General Nicolás Espinoza
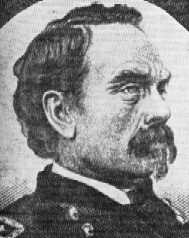

8th Head of State of El Salvador
- In office 10 April 1835 – 15 November 1835
- Deputy: José María Silva
- Preceded by: Joaquín Escolán y Balibrera
- Succeeded by: Francisco Gómez

2nd Deputy Head of State of El Salvador
- In office 30 January 1829 – 3 April 1832
- Governor: José María Cornejo; José Damián Villacorta; José María Cornejo
- Preceded by: Mariano Prado
- Succeeded by: Joaquín de San Martín

9th President of the Supreme Court of Justice of El Salvador
- In office 1840–1841
- Preceded by: Eustaquio Cuéllar
- Succeeded by: Anselmo Paiz

Personal details
- Born: November 1795 Tenancingo, San Salvador
- Died: March 1845 (aged 49) Nacaome, Honduras
- Party: Liberal
- Occupation: Politician

Military service
- Allegiance: Central America; El Salvador
- Rank: General

Nicolás Espinoza (November 1795 – March 1845) was a Salvadoran military officer and politician who served as the 8th head of state of El Salvador from 10 April 1835 to 15 November 1835. At the time, El Salvador was a constituent state of the Federal Republic of Central America.

== Biography ==
Nicolás Espinoza was born in November 1795 in Tenancingo, then a part of New Spain.

The Legislative Assembly of El Salvador elected Espinoza as the state's head of state in the March 1835 election.

Espinoza served as the president of the Supreme Court of Justice of El Salvador from 1840 to 1841. He died in Nacaome, Honduras in March 1845.

Political offices
Preceded by Mariano Prado	Deputy Head of State of El Salvador; 1829–1832	Succeeded by Joaquín de San Martín
Preceded by Joaquín Escolán y Balibrera	Head of State of El Salvador; 1835	Succeeded by Francisco Gómez
Preceded by Eustaquio Cuéllar	President of the Supreme Court of Justice of El Salvador; 1840–1841	Succeeded by Anselmo Paiz
