= Anastasio Aquino's rebellion =

Salvadoran indigenous uprising, 1792–1833

Date	January 1833 – 23 April 1833
Location	El Salvador, Federal Republic of Central America
Result	Rebellion suppressed

Belligerents
Federal Republic of Central America: El Salvador	Indigenous rebels

Commanders and leaders
Mariano Prado; Joaquín de San Martín; Juan José Guzmán; Juan José López	Anastasio Aquino (POW)

Strength
5,000	2,500–5,000

Anastasio Aquino's rebellion was an uprising led by Salvadoran indigenous leader Anastasio Aquino (15 April 1792, in Santiago Nonualco, El Salvador – 24 July 1833, in San Vicente, El Salvador) in El Salvador during the time it belonged to the Federal Republic of Central America.

Aquino was born into a family belonging to the Taytes (chiefs) of the Nonualco, an Indigenous tribe of the Pipil nation that occupied the territory of the current Department of La Paz.

== Background ==
After the independence of Central America from Spain, it was briefly united with the Mexican Empire of Agustín de Iturbide (1821–23). In 1823, with the fall of Emperor Iturbide, it declared independence from Mexico together with the states of Guatemala, Honduras, Nicaragua and Costa Rica. The five states formed a short-lived federal republic that lasted until 1840, but it was a difficult existence. The confrontations between Liberals and Conservatives, the local caudillos, the government's lack of resources and its precarious organization, among other things, made the federation unstable.

The need to raise money for the support of the federation lead to a series of economic measures that were unpopular with the majority of the population. Among these were tributes and expropriations of uncultivated land. The latter especially was a blow to the Indigenous population, who during colonial times had retained the right to practice slash-and-burn agriculture in lands not occupied by haciendas. Now the haciendas expanded and the land available for subsistence agriculture by the Indigenous shrank. Forced labor in mines and fields also continued. Through this process, the new governmental structure built on the already harmful policies towards the indigenous population that were put forth by the Spaniards.

The government of El Salvador had to implement unpopular measures in 1832, including a direct tax on real estate and on rents. This led to discontent and to popular uprisings. A major revolt occurred at San Miguel, but others occurred at Chalatenango, Izalco and Sonsonate. These were suppressed.

== Rebellion ==
The principal uprising occurred in Santiago Nonualco, in late-1832 to early-1833. Aquino was a worker on an indigo plantation there, and he rebelled following the arrest of his brother by the hacienda owner. Aquino called for disobedience to the government. He and his followers attacked army posts -recruiting the Indigenous conscripts there- and burned haciendas. There have been claims that the spoils were distributed to the poor, though these claims are unconfirmed.

By the end of January 1833, Aquino managed to assemble an army large enough to do battle. His force was estimated at 2,000 to 5,000 men, most armed with lances. The revolt started in the hacienda Jalponguita, in Santiago Nonualco, and spread along the Comalapa and Lempa Rivers.

The commandant of the neighboring city of San Vicente, Juan José Guzmán, received orders to suppress the rebellion. His first attempt ended in an ambush. Another attack on February 5 was also unsuccessful. When he received news of this last defeat, Commandant Guzmán fled.

Meanwhile, in the capital, San Salvador, political chief Mariano Prado, realizing he was incapable of controlling the situation, turned over power to vice-chief Joaquín de San Martín. Before this transfer of power there was discontent in the ranks of the military, and for this reason they abandoned the capital. The city descended into chaos, and San Martín had to take shelter to save his life.

Aquino did not know of the disorder in San Salvador. If he had, its occupation would not have been difficult. Having taken Zacatecoluca, he decided to attack San Vicente on February 14. The people of San Vicente made haste to protect all objects of value. With two detachments — one under the command of Aquino's brother and the other of a friend — the rebels arrived early in the morning of the 15th. They were received without hostility; the inhabitants preferred to avoid a fight.

Aquino intended to burn the city, since it had been the source of the first attacks on his army and it was where the exploitive landlords lived. However he was dissuaded by the intervention of an old householder for whom he had worked. Aquino was named the political chief of San Vicente by his supporters, but he was unable to prevent a general sacking of the city. According to popular tradition, Aquino went to the church of Nuestra Señora del Pilar and taking the crown from an image of St. Joseph, proclaimed himself King of the Nonualcos.

In Tepetitán he was proclaimed General Commandant of the Liberation Army and he proclaimed the famous Declaration of Tepetitán on February 16. In it he ordered drastic punishments for murder (death), wounding someone (loss of a hand), joining the government forces (as specified by law), robbery (loss of a hand) and vagrancy, among other crimes. The declaration also contained a section on the protection of married women. Aquino also ended payment of taxes to the government, especially on indigo (the main product of the region), banned aguardiente, and proclaimed the end of forced labor. He prohibited collection of debts contracted before the rebellion, with a punishment of ten years in prison.

The government tried to reach an agreement with the rebels under which they would put down their arms, through mediation by two priests. Only one of them, Juan Bautista Navarro, was able to contact Aquino, and he obtained no results.

Finally the authorities were able to raise an army to confront Aquino. To the army were added many residents of San Vicente, who wanted to take revenge for the sacking of the city. One of the army commanders, Major C. Cuellar, wanted to confront Aquino alone, but he was defeated. According to legend, Aquino rushed at him with the cry Treinta arriba, treinta abajo, y adentro Santiagueños ("Thirty above, thirty below, and inside Santiagueños"). This probably referred to the place occupied by his troops at the moment of the attack.

== End of the Rebellion ==
On the morning of February 28 the decisive battle occurred in Santiago Nonualco. Apparently the rebels were also being decimated by a disease. Taking advantage of this, Colonel Juan José López, in command of 5,000 men, launched a general attack and dispersed the rebels. Aquino was not captured.

In order to capture the leader, the government offered to spare the lives of anyone who revealed his whereabouts. One traitor took advantage of the offer, and Aquino was captured on April 23.

He was moved to Zacatecoluca, where he was tried and condemned to death. He was executed by firing squad in San Vicente. His head was cut off and displayed in an iron cage with the label "Example for rebels". It was later taken to the capital.

== Anastasio Aquino in popular culture ==
After the rebellion a song circulated, beginning with the following lines:

El indio Anastasio Aquino
Le mandó decir a Prado,
que no peleara jamás
Contra el pueblo de Santiago.

Aquino lo dijo así,
Tan feo el indio pero vení

También le mandó decir
Que los indios mandarían
Porque este país era de ellos
Como el mismo lo sabía

Aquino lo dijo así,
Tan feo el indio pero vení

(The Indian Anastasio Aquino
Was sent to say to Prado,
That he never fight
Against the people of Santiago.

Aquino said it thus,
Tan feo el indio pero vení

He also was sent to say
That the Indians would rule
Because this country was theirs
As he himself knew.

Aquino said it thus,
Tan feo el indio pero vení)

Also he has appeared in literature. For example, the poets Pedro Geoffroy Rivas and Roque Dalton have dedicated some of their work to him. The writer Matilde Elena López wrote a theater piece with the name of The Ballad of Anastasio Aquino.

Up to the present day, Aquino has been taken as a symbol of rebellion and liberty by sectors on the political left.

== Bibliography ==
=== Historical works ===
- Vidal, Manuel (1961). Nociones de historia de Centro América (in Spanish). San Salvador: Editorial Universitaria.
- Sosa, Domínguez; Alberto, Julio (1962). Ensayo histórico sobre las tribus nonualcas y su caudillo Anastasio Aquino (in Spanish). San Salvador: Dirección General de Publicaciones.
- Ministerio de Educación (1994). Historia de El Salvador (in Spanish). Vol. I. Mexico City: Comisión Nacional de los Libros de Texto Gratuitos.

=== Literary works ===
- Dalton, Roque (1980). La ventana en el rostro (in Spanish). San Salvador: Editorial universitaria.
- Dalton, Roque (1980). Las historias prohibias del pulgarcito (in Spanish). Mexico City: Siglo XXI Editores, S.A.
- López, Matilde Elena (1978). La balada de Anastasio Aquino (in Spanish). San Salvador: Dirección de Publicaciones.
- Vidal, Manuel (1974). El libro de las Anécdotas (in Spanish). San Salvador: Dirección de Publicaciones.
- Olano Oscar, "Anastasio Aquino" Song recorded in Switzerland, ex libris label, (Picason, Son de los Alpes CD 4121) copyrights: SUISA
