= 1835 Salvadoran gubernatorial election =

← 1833	15 March 1835	1842 →
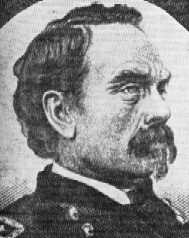
Candidate	Nicolás Espinoza
Party	Liberal
Governor before election
Joaquín Escolán (acting)
Liberal
Elected Governor
Nicolás Espinoza
Liberal

Gubernatorial elections were held in El Salvador (then a part of the Federal Republic of Central America) on 15 March 1835. Liberal Nicolás Espinoza was elected governor, and the Legislative Assembly reaffirmed his victory on 6 April 1835. Espinoza assumed office on 10 April 1835.

== Results ==
Candidate	Party
Nicolás Espinoza	Liberal
Total
Source: University of California, San Diego
