= Salvadoran campaign of 1832 =

Military conflict in El Salvador

Salvadoran Campaign of 1832
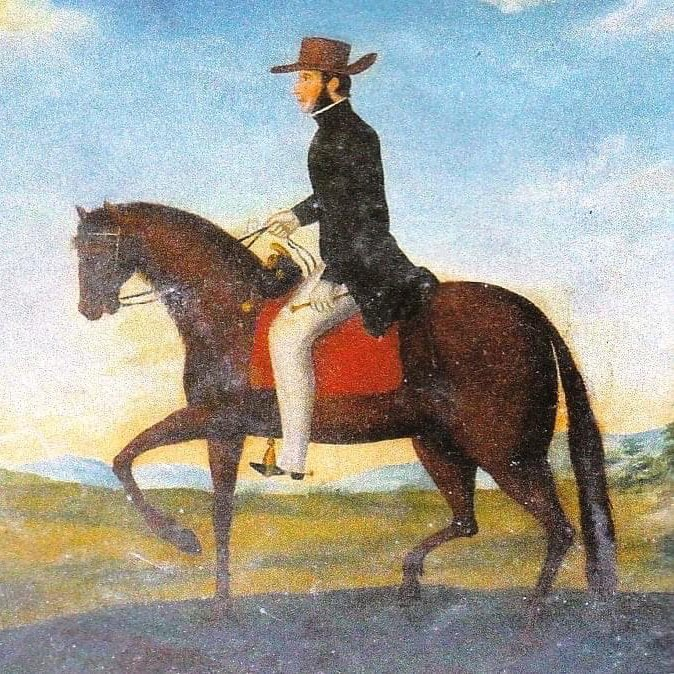
- Francisco Morazán
Date	March 14–28, 1832
Location	El Salvador
Result	Salvadoran victory: José María Cornejo is overthrown; Federal rule in El Salvador is restored

Combatants
Federal Republic of Central America: Guatemala; Honduras; Nicaragua	El Salvador

Commanders and leaders
Francisco Morazán; Dionisio de Herrera; Mariano Gálvez	José María Cornejo

The Salvadoran Campaign of 1832 or the Salvadoran Rebellion of 1832 was a military conflict in El Salvador in 1832.

== Background ==
In 1824, the Federal Republic of Central America had been formed, which was a loose federation of 5 Republics : Guatemala, Honduras, El Salvador, Nicaragua and Costa Rica. A Civil War (1826–1829) had brought the Liberal General Francisco Morazán to power.

== Conflict ==
In 1832, public order was disturbed, as revolutionary unrest broke out, almost at the same time, in three places in the Republic of El Salvador, on the coasts of Northern Honduras and in Soconusco. This had been planned by Conservatives who had been defeated in the First Central American Civil War in Guatemala in 1829, supported by Archbishop of Guatemala Fray Ramón Casaus y Torres, who was exiled in Havana.

When President Morazán learned that the Head of El Salvador, Jose Maria Cornejo, had contacts with exiled Conservatives, and conspired to change the order of things established by triumph of the liberal party in 1829, he moved to Santa Ana, in January 1832, where he received, from the rebel leader, a strict order to leave that territory.

In view of this hostile actions, the Federal Congress authorized the President to reduce by arms Head of State Cornejo, who was already threatening to separate El Salvador from the Federal Pact. General Morazán, with enough troops, and aided effectively by the governments of Guatemala and Nicaragua, chaired by Mariano Gálvez and Dionisio Herrera respectively, marched to El Salvador, defeated Cornejo on the following March 14 in the plains of Jocoro, and forced him to take refuge in the capital of the State, which he decided to defend at all costs.

The federals attacked the city, by Milingo, Soyapango and Agua Caliente, and after two hours of close fighting, in the streets of the town, they took over the city on March 28, 1832. Cornejo and his main chiefs and officers were imprisoned in Guatemala, and he was replaced as Head of State of El Salvador by Mariano Prado.
