= 1832 Salvadoran gubernatorial election =

- April 1832
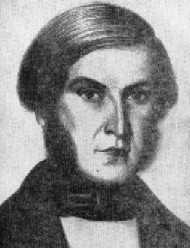
| Candidate | Mariano Prado |
| Party | Liberal |
| Running mate | Joaquín de San Martín |
Governor before election
Francisco Morazán (provisional)
Liberal
Elected Governor
Mariano Prado
Liberal

Gubernatorial elections were held in El Salvador (then a part of the Federal Republic of Central America) in April 1832. Francisco Morazán had overthrown the conservative government of José María Cornejo and held new elections to determine his replacement. Liberal Mariano Prado won the election. He assumed office on 25 July 1832.

== Results ==
| Candidate | Running mate | Party |
|---|---|---|
| Mariano Prado | Joaquín de San Martín | Liberal |
Total
Source: University of California, San Diego
