= Diego Vigil y Cocaña =

Honduran politician

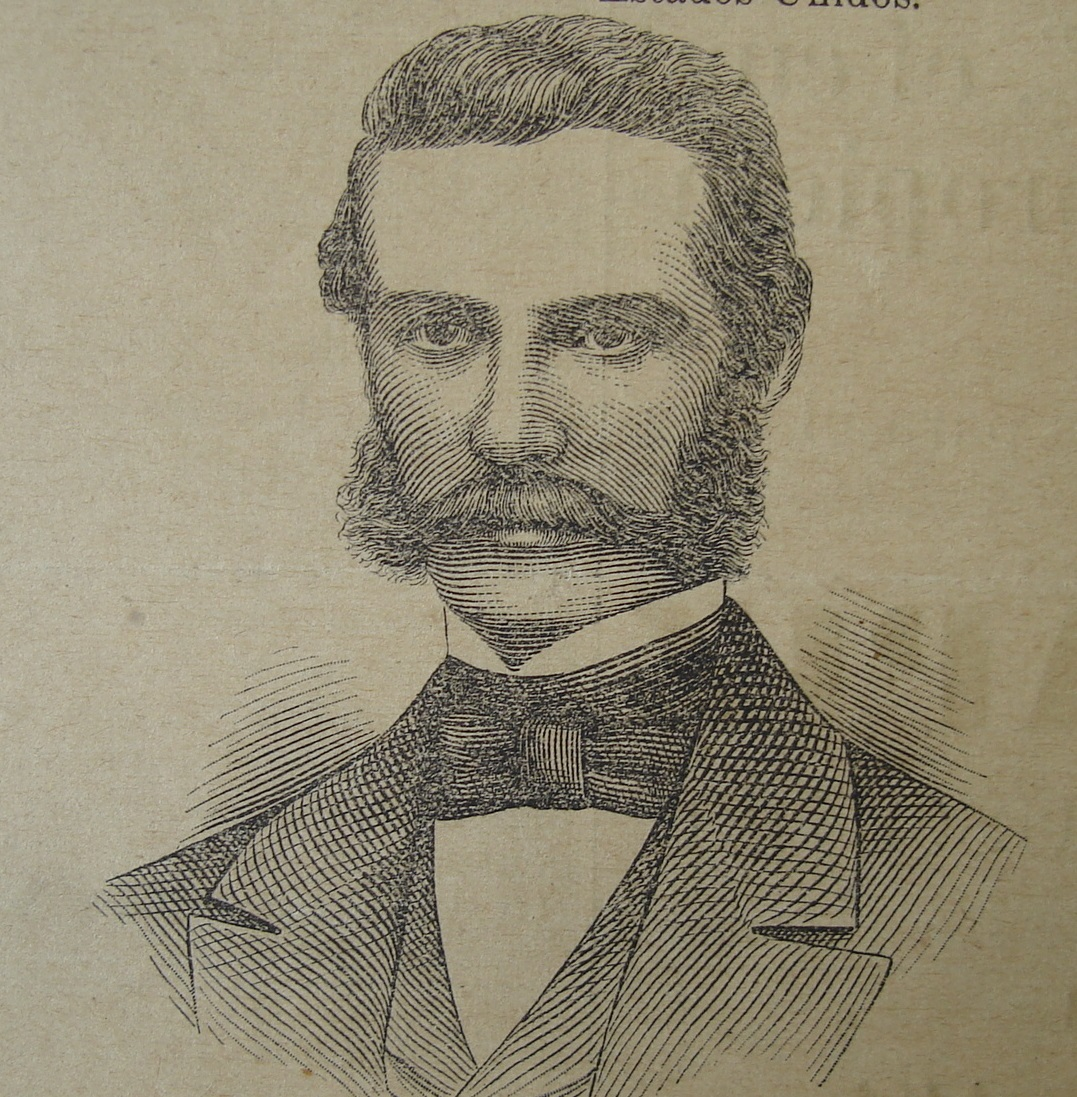

Interim President of Federal Republic of Central America
- In office 1 February 1839 – 31 March 1840
- Preceded by: Francisco Morazán
- Succeeded by: Office Abolished

9th Head of State of El Salvador
- In office 1 February 1836 – 23 May 1837
- Preceded by: Francisco Gómez
- Succeeded by: Timoteo Menéndez
- In office 7 June 1837 – 6 January 1838
- Preceded by: Timoteo Menéndez
- Succeeded by: Timoteo Menéndez

7th President of Honduras
- In office 30 June 1828 – 2 December 1829
- Preceded by: Francisco Morazán
- Succeeded by: Francisco Morazán

Personal details
- Born: 1799 Tegucigalpa, Honduras
- Died: 10 January 1845 (aged 45–46) Granada, Nicaragua
- Party: Liberal
- Education: University of León
- Profession: politician

Diego Vigil y Cocaña (1799, Tegucigalpa, Honduras – 10 January 1845, Granada, Nicaragua) was a Central American politician. He was the last president of the Federal Republic of Central America (1839–40), during its disintegration. He was also chief of state of the federal states of Honduras (1829) and El Salvador (1836–37 and 1837–38).

== Background and early political career ==
Diego Vigil was the son of José Vigil Fernández and Josefa Cocaña Fábrega. He was related to the Central American Liberal leader, general and president, Francisco Morazán, and was among his closest fellow combatants. Vigil studied law at the University of León in León, Nicaragua, and was afterwards temporarily active as a lawyer and notary in Tegucigalpa.

In 1824, he was a member of the federal parliament. In 1826–27, he was governor of the province of Tegucigalpa, but after the occupation of that city by the troops of federal President Manuel José Arce, he was arrested. When Morazán reconquered Honduras, Vigil was freed.

== As chief of state of Honduras ==
After Morazán's victory in the Battle of La Trinidad (10 November 1827), the Legislative Assembly of Honduras named Vigil vice-chief of state on 27 November 1827. Morazán later made him chief of state of Honduras (7 March 1829 to 2 December 1829).

During his term of office, the Legislative Assembly dissolved the religious communities in Honduras. Their goods passed to the state, and several monasteries and other buildings were occupied as public buildings.

== As chief of state of El Salvador ==
General Morazán made him chief of state of the state of El Salvador, effective 1 February 1836. He served until 23 May 1837, and then again from 7 July 1837 to 6 January 1838.

During his administration a cholera epidemic broke out in El Salvador, spread by pilgrims returning from the shrine of Esquipulas. Because of the cholera, the government stopped all payments except for public employees, in order to devote the resources to fighting the epidemic. By January 1837, the cholera had spread to all the populations of the state. The state government established sanitary committees to meet in the capitals of the departments.

In March 1836, Licenciado and General Nicolás Espinoza, former chief of state of the state of El Salvador, was expelled from the state, and his title of Benemerito de la Patria was withdrawn.

On 8 January 1837, the Legislative Assembly passed the annual budget, totaling 85,028 pesos. It also authorized the introduction of water into the town of San Miguel.

On 23 May 1837 an insurrection of natives in Zacatecoluca and Cojutepeque broke out, with much killing and pillaging. On the same day, the office of chief of state passed from Vigil to Timoteo Menéndez. Vigil returned to office six weeks later, on 7 July.

In June 1837 a revolutionary movement erupted in Santa Ana, but it was suppressed. The government decreed amnesty for the participants in the various revolutionary movements.

On 6 January 1838, Timoteo Menéndez again became chief of state.

== As president of the federal republic ==
After federal Vice President José Gregorio Salazar was killed during the occupation of Guatemala City by the rebel forces of Rafael Carrera, Vigil was selected to succeed him (1 February 1838). Morazán was then in his second term as president of the federation.

On 1 February 1839, Morazán turned the presidency over to Vigil. Nicaragua, Honduras and Costa Rica had withdrawn from the federation in 1838, and soon Guatemala followed suit (17 April 1839). This left the "federation" with only one member, El Salvador. On 31 March 1840, El Salvador dissolved the federation and Vigil's term came to an end.

== Later years ==
On 8 April 1840, Diego Vigil and Francisco Morazán sailed from El Salvador for Costa Rica and Panama. After Morazán's execution on 15 September 1842 in San José, Costa Rica, Vigil settled in Granada, Nicaragua, where he remained until his death in 1845.

Political offices
Preceded by Francisco Morazán	Head of State of Honduras (acting); 1829	Succeeded by Francisco Morazán
Preceded by Francisco Gómez	Head of State of El Salvador; 1836–1837	Succeeded by Timoteo Menéndez
Preceded by Timoteo Menéndez	Head of State of El Salvador; 1837–1838	Succeeded by Timoteo Menéndez
Preceded by Francisco Morazán	President of Central America; 1838–1839	Succeeded by (none)
