= 1811 Independence Movement =

1811 revolt against Spanish rule in colonial El Salvador

- Part of the Spanish American wars of independence
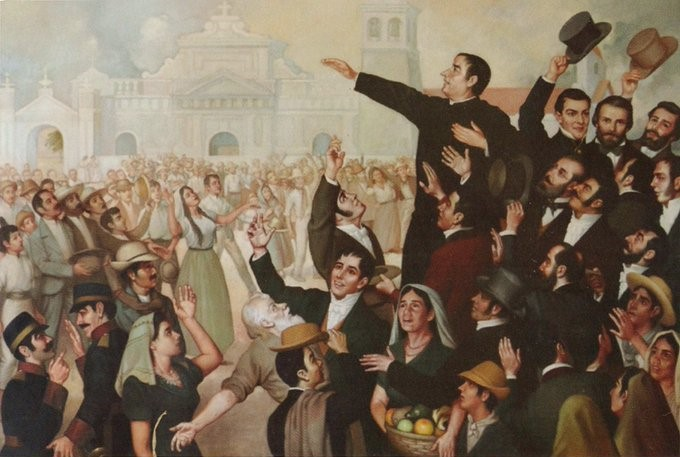
- Painting of the First Shout of Independence
- Date: 5 November 1811 – 3 December 1811 (4 weeks)
- Location: San Salvador, Guatemala, New Spain, Spanish Empire; 13°41′56″N 89°11′29″W
- Result: Revolt suppressed

Parties
(Spain) Spanish Empire	Salvadoran revolutionaries

Lead figures
(Spain) Antonio Gutiérrez y Ulloa (Spain) José de Aycinena (Spain) José de Bustamante	José Matías Delgado; Manuel José Arce; Santiago José Celis; Juan Manuel Rodríguez

The 1811 Independence Movement (Spanish: Movimiento de Independencia de 1811), known in El Salvador as the First Shout of Independence (Primer Grito de Independencia), was the first of a series of revolts in Central America in modern-day El Salvador against Spanish rule and dependency on the Captaincy General of Guatemala. The independence movement was led by prominent Salvadoran and Central American figures such as José Matías Delgado, Manuel José Arce, and Santiago José Celis.

== Prelude ==
At the beginning of the 19th century, agitation grew in the American territories ruled by Spain. The previous century was dominated by the growing support of ideas of individual freedom, which characterized the Enlightenment that took place in Europe and the Americas. Most influential were the American Revolution, with the resulting liberation of the British Thirteen Colonies, and the French Revolution, which seeded the restlessness and search for freedom in the Spanish American territories under dominion of the Spanish. The appointment of Antonio Gutiérrez y Ulloa as Colonial Intendant of San Salvador on 28 June 1805 caused more unrest in San Salvador as he was seen as "infatuated" and "difficult". It was unpopular with those living in the intendancy.

In the Intendancy of San Salvador, many Creoles and other settlers wanted to separate control of the colony from the Captaincy General of Guatemala, primarily due to economic and political reasons. However, landholders in San Salvador did not realize the economic power of their holdings until they started instituting the system of widespread cultivation of a lucrative export commodity. The first of these was cacao and then, later, indigo. Due to economic success resulting from indigo, San Salvador became considered the second city of the Captaincy General of Guatemala. Greater administrative autonomy or outright independence for San Salvador would reduce the high level of taxes paid to Spain and Guatemala and would raise finances for the colony. Napoleón Bonaparte's invasion of Spain in 1808 and the removal of Ferdinand VII from the Spanish throne created an atmosphere of unrest in San Salvador and across all the Spanish American colonies.

== Revolt in San Salvador ==
The insurrectionists organized themselves along with prominent middle-class supporters of the cause of independence, such as doctors and priests who participated in the event. These included doctors such as Santiago José Celis, the Aguilar y Bustamante brothers (Nicolás, Vicente and Manuel) and the priest José Matías Delgado. Others included Manuel José Arce, Juan Manuel Rodríguez and Pedro Pablo Castillo.

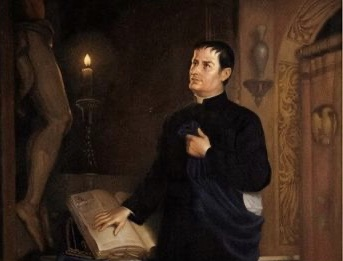
José Matías Delgado

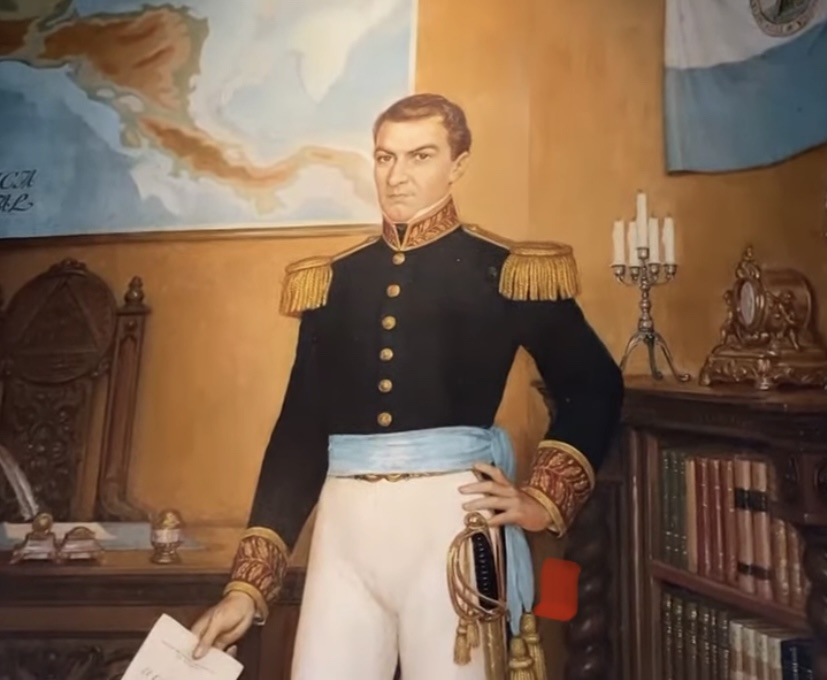
Manuel Jose Arce

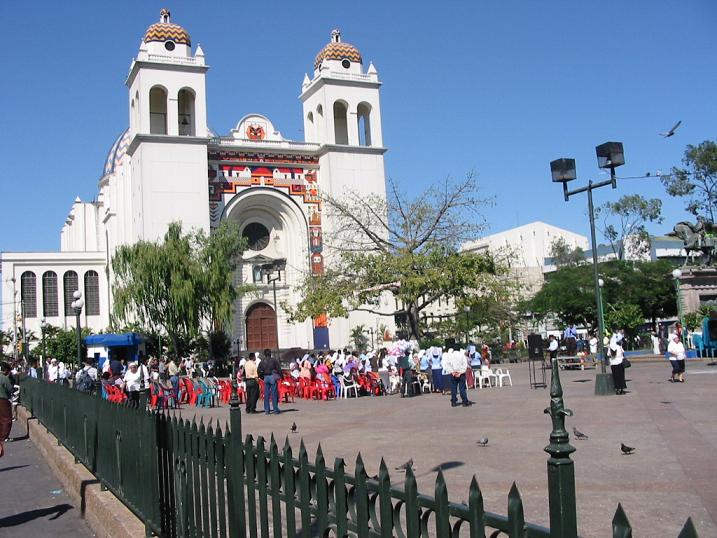
The rebels assembled in this town square by the then St. Dominic Church.

On 5 November, the revolt began in San Salvador. According to tradition, the rebels waited for a signal from the bell tower of the Church of La Merced, but this did not occur at the scheduled time. The rebels later assembled on the town square outside the church where Manuel José Arce proclaimed in front of the public: "There is no King, nor Intendant, nor Captain General. We only must obey our alcaldes," meaning that since Ferdinand VII had been deposed, all other officials appointed by him no longer legitimately held power. A tumult in the square grew so that the intendant, Gutiérrez y Ulloa, asked the gathered appoint someone to deliver their demands formally. Manuel José Arce was chosen as the leader by the crowd. Despite this, the insurrectionists took arms and proclaimed the total independence of San Salvador from the Spanish crown but were later subdued.

In the following days, the independence movement extended to the cities of Santiago Nonualco, Usulután, Chalatenango, Santa Ana, Tejutla and Cojutepeque. The two other notable revolts occurred on 24 November in the city of Metapán and on 20 December in Sensuntepeque.

== Suppression and aftermath ==
Despite the efforts of the insurrectionists, the cause of independence was not shared by the city councils of the intendancy. Neither San Miguel, nor San Vicente nor Santa Ana joined them. Unable to amass support, the rebels negotiated with a delegation from the Guatemalan capital to take control. The new Intendant Colonel José Alejandro de Aycinena, arrived on 8 December with Guatemalan troops and priests to force them to swear obedience to the crown and reclaimed the city. The majority of the population well received the new government due to Aycinena's policy of understanding and nonconfrontation. However, several days later, unrest broke out in the neighboring Intendancy of Nicaragua, where uprisings broke out in León on 13 December and later in Granada on 22 December. Nevertheless, both were soon suppressed. The movement of independence in Central America was peaceful, unlike the other Latin American countries, which fought fierce battles to become independent states.

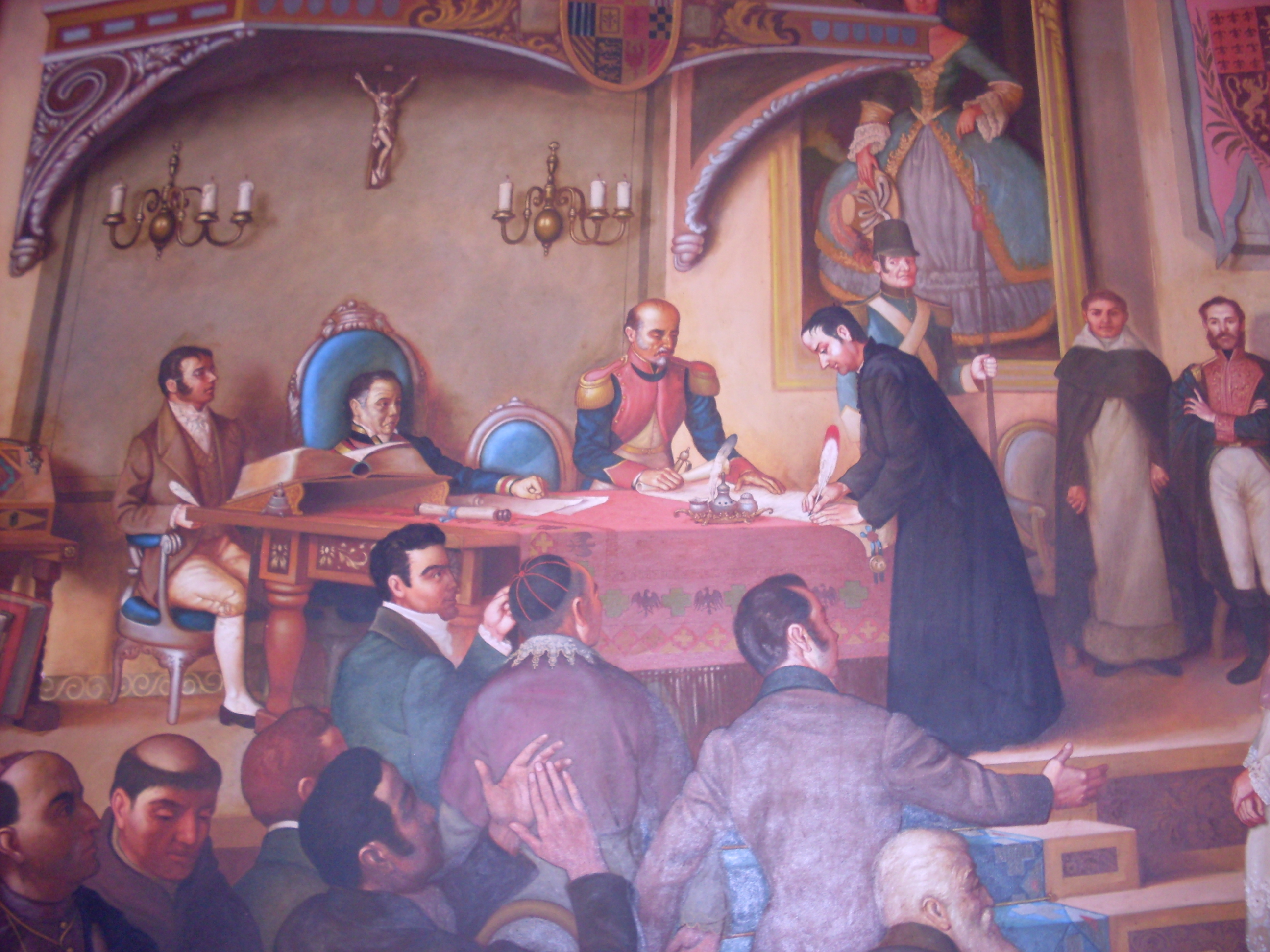
José Matías Delgado At the time of signing the Central American act of independence, in a representation of the meeting of September 15, 1821 of the Chilean painter Luis Vergara Ahumada.

Many of those involved in the events in El Salvador and Nicaragua were incarcerated, but José Matías Delgado was taken back with the delegation to Guatemala City. Despite his past activities, or perhaps because of them, Delgado was elected in 1813 as a representative on the Provincial Deputation of Guatemala created by the Spanish Constitution of 1812. He also became director of the Tridentino Seminary in the capital city, therefore, he was not in El Salvador at the time of the second insurrection in 1814, and so did not take part in it.

He was once again elected provincial deputy in 1820 when the Spanish Constitution was restored, and on 15 September 1821, he was among those who signed the Act of Independence of Central America in Guatemala City. On 28 November 1821, he became the Province of San Salvador's political chief (jefe pólitico civil). As its executive officer, he led its separation from Guatemala to prevent the former intendancy from becoming part of First Mexican Empire. Arce later became president of the Federal Republic of Central America from 1825 to 1829, once full independence from Spain and Mexico became a reality.

In El Salvador, the independence movement and the 1811 Revolt are officially commemorated every 5 November and recognized as the "First Shout for the Independence of Central America".

In 1814, a second, smaller Independence revolt occurred across San Salvador and its surrounding towns.

== See also ==
- 1814 Independence Movement
