= 1833 Salvadoran gubernatorial election =

- May/June 1833
Candidate	Joaquín de San Martín
Party	Liberal
Governor before election
Mariano Prado
Liberal
Elected Governor
Joaquín de San Martín
Liberal

Gubernatorial elections were held in El Salvador (then a part of the Federal Republic of Central America) in 1833. Liberal Joaquín de San Martín, the then incumbent deputy governor of El Salvador, was elected as Mariano Prado's successor. San Martín assumed office on 1 July 1833.

== Results ==
Candidate	Party
Joaquín de San Martín	Liberal
Total
Source: University of California, San Diego
