= José Gregorio Salazar =

Salvadoran politician

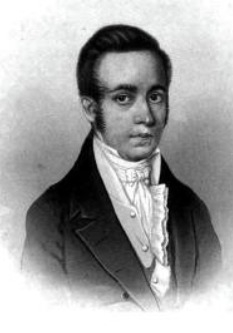

President of Central America
- In office 16 September 1834 – 14 February 1835; Interim President
- Preceded by: Francisco Morazán
- Succeeded by: Francisco Morazán

Head of State of El Salvador
- In office 13 July 1834 – 30 September 1834; Provisional Head of State
- Preceded by: Carlos Salazar Castro
- Succeeded by: Joaquín Escolán y Balibrera

Personal details
- Born: José Gregorio Salazar y Castro; 1773 San Salvador, Captaincy General of Guatemala
- Died: 1 February 1838 (aged 64–65) Guatemala City, Federal Republic of Central America
- Party: Liberal
- Occupation: Politician

José Gregorio Salazar y Castro (1773 – 1 February 1838) was a general and a Liberal politician in Central America. He was acting president of the Federal Republic of Central America from September 16, 1834 to February 14, 1835, in between two administrations of Francisco Morazán. In 1838 he was assassinated by a mob supporting rebel General Rafael Carrera.

Salazar's parents were Gregorio Salazar and Francisca Lara Mogrovejo. He married Francisca Castro y Lara. Their son, General Carlos Salazar, served briefly as provisional president of the state of El Salvador, from June 23 to July 13, 1834.

== Political offices ==
He held various offices in Central America, including councilman in the city government of Guatemala City and mayor in 1825; political chief of the departments of Guatemala (1825) and Quetzaltenango (1830); commander of the Escuadrón Sedentario of Guatemala City (1831); and vice-chief of the State of Guatemala (1834 and 1838).

He was vice president of the Central American Federation in 1834 when President Morazán temporarily relinquished his duties to take the field to fight rebels. He served as acting president from September 16, 1834 to February 14, 1835, when Morazán resumed the office.

== Political crisis in El Salvador ==
On June 23, 1834 his son, Carlos Salazar, a partisan of General Morazán, overthrew the conservative president of the state of El Salvador, Joaquín de San Martín, and took power as provisional chief of the state. The federal government, in the hands of the Liberals, took over direct control of El Salvador on July 13, 1834. José Gregorio Salazar (the father) ruled the state as provisional chief from that date to September 30, 1834.

On September 21, 1834 the Assembly of the state of El Salvador met in San Vicente, charged with electing a new state president. They chose Licenciado José María Silva, a Liberal, but this vote was declared void. On September 30 they voted to give the office to Councilor Joaquín Escolán. Escolán served from that date to October 14, when Silva took office, until April 10, 1835.

== Death ==
On February 1, 1838, rebel Rafael Carrera took Guatemala City, capital of the federation. His troops, mountain dwellers from Mataquescuintla, ran wild in the city, committing many kinds of depredations. Salazar was vice president of the republic at the time. He and his family took refuge in the house of a friend, Doctor Quirino Flores. Salazar was killed, with a child in his arms, trying to defend his family.

Political offices
Preceded by Francisco Morazán	President of Central America; 1834-1835	Succeeded by Francisco Morazán
Preceded by Carlos Salazar	Head of State of El Salvador (provisional); 1834	Succeeded by Joaquín Escolán
