= Juan Manuel Rodríguez =

President of El Salvador in 1824 (1771–1847)

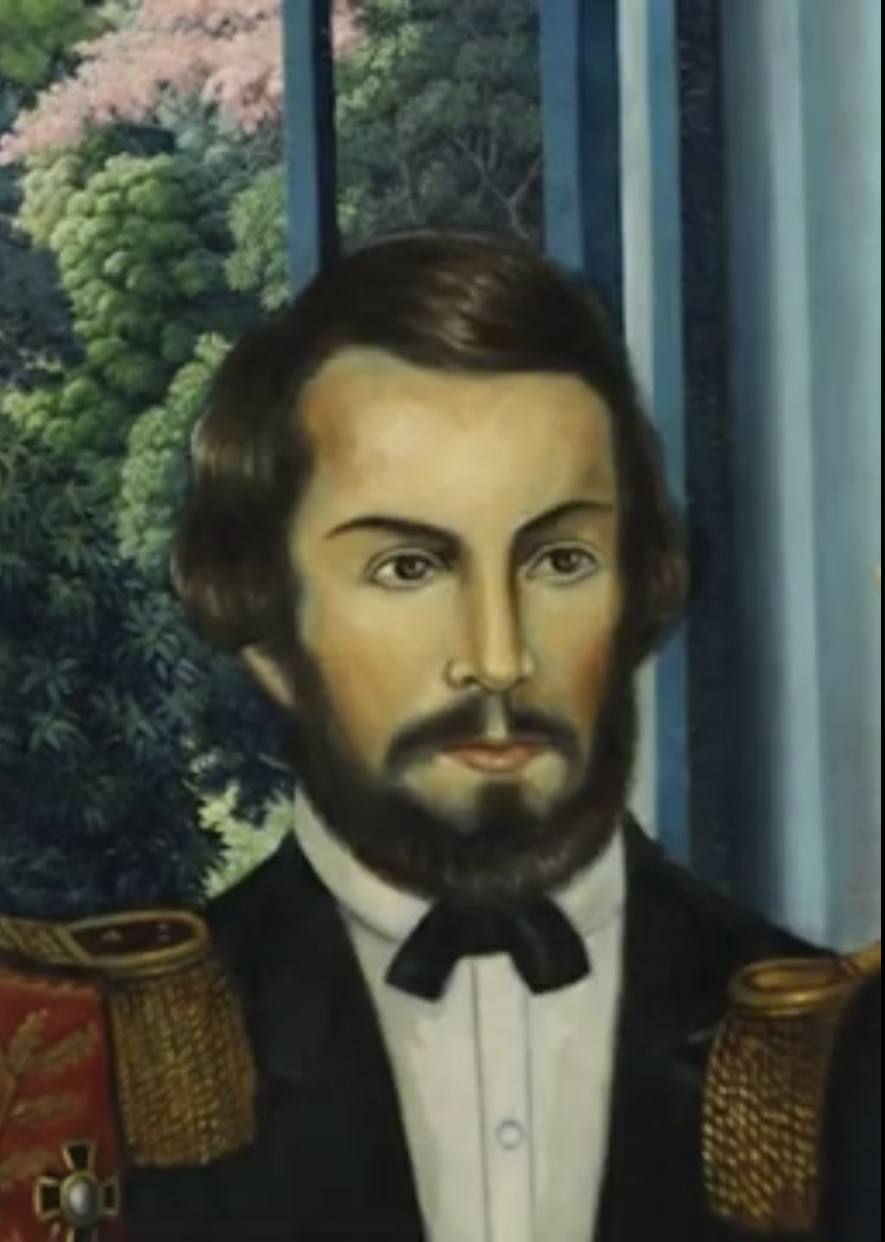

Heads of state of El Salvador
- In office 22 April 1824 – 1 October 1824
- Preceded by: Mariano Prado
- Succeeded by: Mariano Prado

Personal details
- Born: 31 December 1771 San Salvador, El Salvador
- Died: 1847 (aged 75–76) Cojutepeque, El Salvador
- Party: Independent
- Profession: Military

Juan Manuel Rodríguez (31 December 1771 – 1847) was a Salvadoran revolutionary against Spain and later president of the State of El Salvador within the Federal Republic of Central America (briefly in 1824).

He was born in San Salvador to Pedro Delgado and Josefa Rodríguez. His father was Panamanian and his mother was Salvadoran. They were not married.

== Early career ==
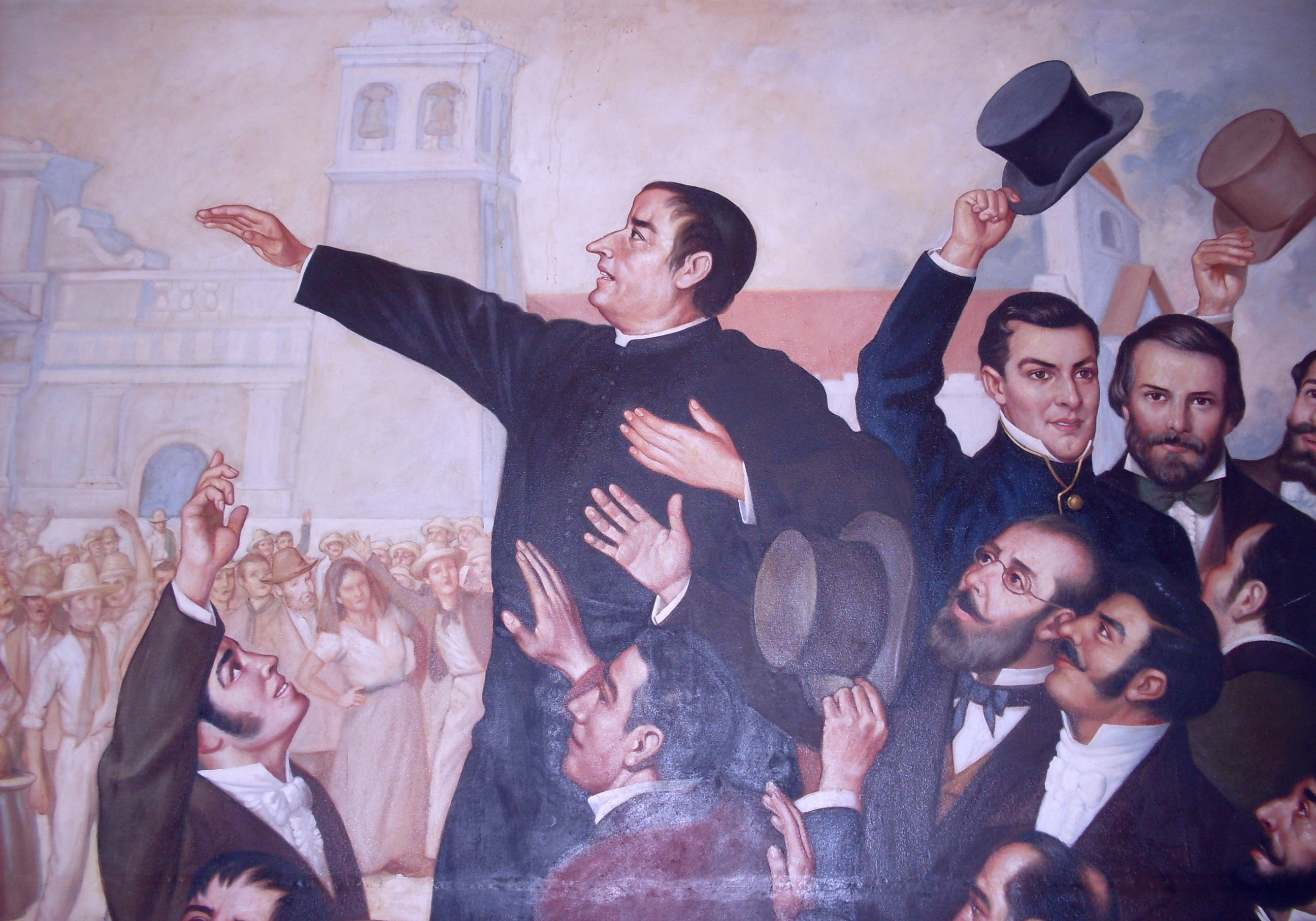
Some of the leaders of the Cry for Independence on 5 November 1811 in San Salvador. (such as José Matías Delgado, Manuel José Arce and Juan Manuel Rodríguez) appear in the picture of Luis Vergara Ahumada.

He was one of the leaders of the independence movements in 1811 and 1814, together with Father José Matías Delgado and Manuel José Arce.

He was secretary of the junta that in November 1811 functioned as the first independent government of the province. He was mayor of San Salvador in 1814, elected by popular vote. In this position, he supported the insurrectionary movement of January 24, 1814. He was arrested and sentenced to six years in prison but was pardoned in 1819.

In November 1821 he was named a member of the governing body of the Province of El Salvador. The following January he signed the act separating El Salvador from the old Kingdom of Guatemala, in order to avoid incorporation into the Mexican Empire, which Guatemala had approved. He was commissioned along with Arce and other deputies of the provincial congress to negotiate in Washington, D.C. for the admission of El Salvador to the United States. The fall of the Mexican Empire in 1823 and the independence of Central America ended this diplomatic initiative.

== As chief of state of El Salvador ==
On April 22, 1824, the constituent assembly elected Rodríguez chief of state, and the following day he put into effect the abolition of slavery in the state (declared on December 31, 1823). The government also decreed the foundation of the Diocese of San Salvador and made Father José Matías Delgado, a hero of the independence movement, the first bishop.

In May 1824 the National Assembly of the State ordered the new constitution published and sworn to. Rodríguez established the Supreme Court of Justice. He called elections for chief of state, which were won by Juan Vicente Villacorta Díaz, with Mariano Prado as vice-chief of state. On October 1, 1824, it transferred the executive power from Rodríguez to Prado pending the inauguration of Villacorta. The latter took office on December 13, 1824.

During Rodríguez's term of office, the first official printing press in El Salvador entered service (June 1824). It printed the first newspaper in the state, El Semanario Político Mercantil. The first issue appeared on July 31, 1824.

== Later life ==
After supporting the party of the fiebres for years and serving as treasury secretary, Rodríguez retired to private life. He passed his later years at his hacienda "San Jerónimo", near Cojutepeque. He took minor orders with the Franciscans and performed charitable works. He died of colera on his hacienda in 1847.

Political offices
Preceded by Mariano Prado	Head of State of El Salvador; 1824	Succeeded by Mariano Prado
