= 1872 Salvadoran presidential election =

- 30 January 1872
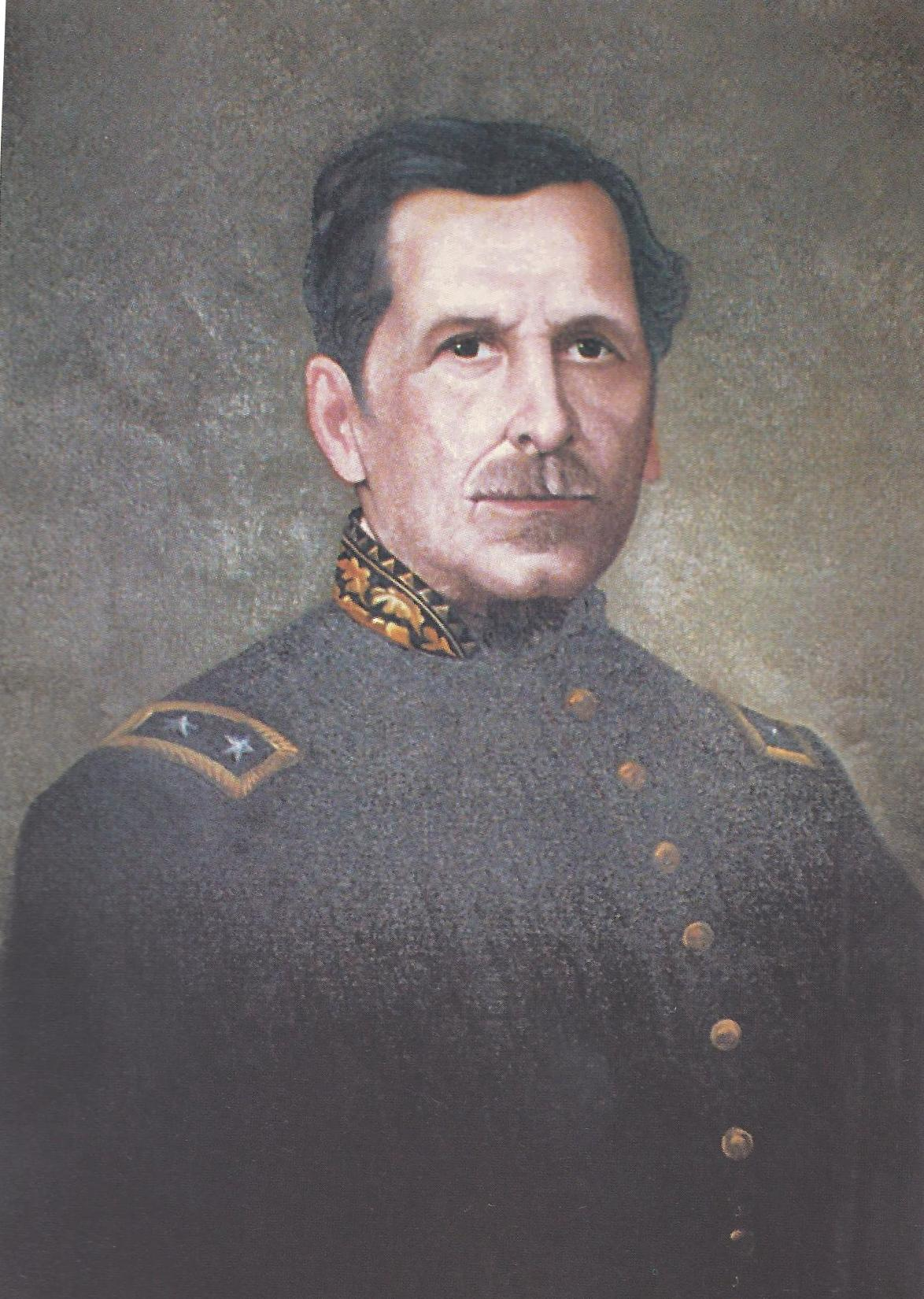
Candidate	Santiago González
Party	Liberal
Running mate	Manuel Méndez
President before election
Santiago González
Liberal
Elected President
Santiago González
Liberal

Presidential elections were held in El Salvador on 30 January 1872. Santiago González ran unopposed and was elected by the legislature.

== Results ==
Candidate	Party
Santiago González	Liberal
Total
Source: University of California, San Diego
