= 1814 Independence Movement =

Military revolt in El Salvador

The 1814 independence Movement (Spanish: Movimiento de Independencia de 1814) was a revolt against Spanish Colonial authorities in present-day El Salvador. The revolt was preceded by the more notable 1811 Independence revolt years earlier.

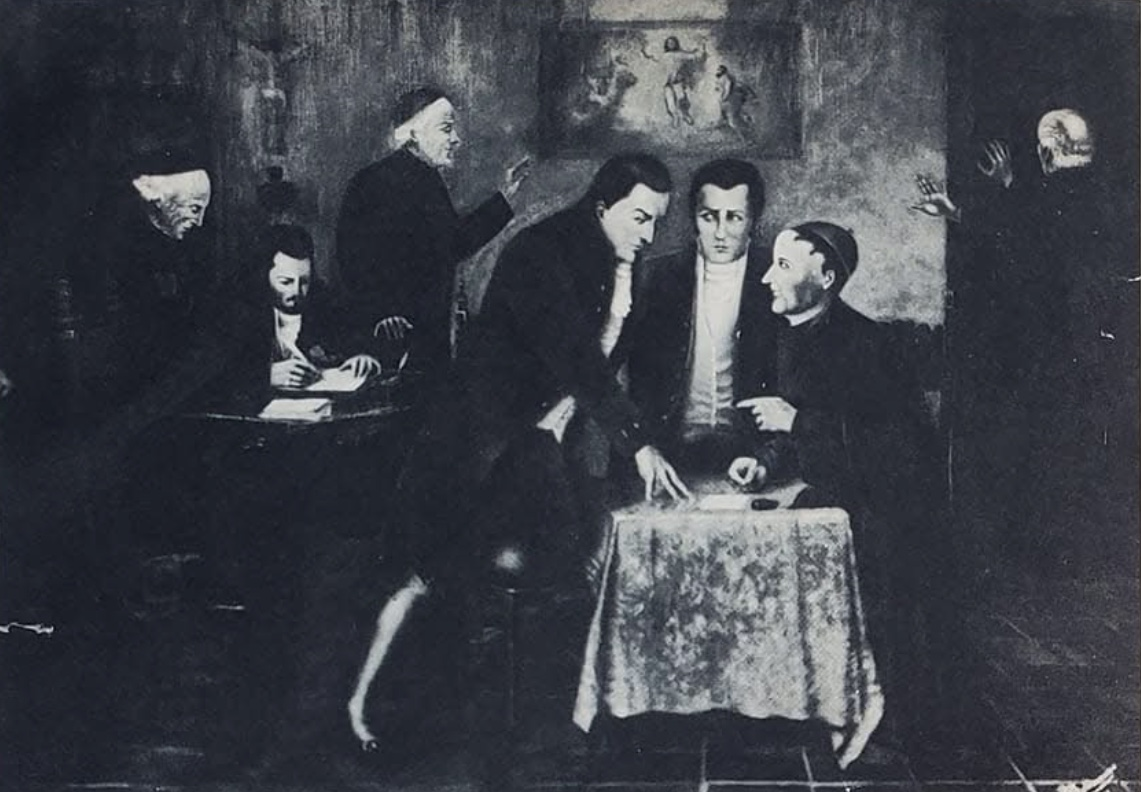
Conspiracy of 1814; Close-up Manuel Jose Arce, Domingo Antonio Lara, Priest Dr. Matías Delgado, In the background The Aguilar Brothers and Juan Manuel Rodríguez.

The revolt occurred on January 22, 1814 and was led by a group of Independentistas, mainly veterans of the revolt years earlier. The revolt was planned by notable figures such as Santiago José Celis and Manuel José Arce while at the estate of Nicolás Aguilar Bustamante in Quezaltepeque.

== The revolt ==
Shortly before the night of the revolt, Intendant José María Peinado was warned of the plot, leading him to order that elections be held in neighboring areas. After most of the positions went to his opponents, he quickly ordered the arrest of many of the newly elected mayors. The subsequent unrest that night allowed for the Independentistas to gather and take up arms across San Salvador.

Not much is written about the actual revolt, but within a few days, the colonial authorities had suppressed the revolt and imprisoned most of the Independentista leaders, including Arce and José Celis.
