= Tenancingo, El Salvador =

El Salvadoran town

Tenancingo
- District
- Location in El Salvador
- Coordinates: 13°50′N 88°59′W
- Country: El Salvador
- Department: Cuscatlán Department
- Elevation: 1,959 ft (597 m)

Population (2024)
  - District: 6,707
  - Rank: 173rd in El Salvador
  - Urban: 1,646
  - Rural: 5,061

Tenancingo is a municipality in the Cuscatlán department of El Salvador.

== Geography ==
Tenancingo is located approximately 15 kilometers (9.3 mi) from the deviation of the Pan-American Highway from which it is accessed via a paved road. (Approximately 2–3 kilometers (1.2–1.9 mi) of that road are gravel).

== History ==
During the pre-Columbian era, the area was inhabited by the Pipil people, additionally under the jurisdiction of Cuzcatlan.

Being a site of the Salvadoran Civil War between the Farabundo Martí National Liberation Front and army around 27 September 1983, it was bombed by the Salvadoran Air Force, resulting in 40–50 deaths and the populace fleeing. Following mediation between the rebels and military by Archbishop of San Salvador Arturo Rivera y Damas, the town was declared a "neutral zone" and 200 people's return was facilitated by the Foundation for Development and Minimum Housing. However, local Colonel Oscar Amaya was frustrated and an occupation resulted in one death. Afterward, the FMLN also violated the agreement. By 20 March 1989, the town had 511 registered voters, with half voting in the 1989 election.
