= Comalapa River =

River in El Salvador

Comalapa
- Location of mouth

Location
- Country: El Salvador

Physical characteristics
- Source
  - location: San Luis Talpa, La Paz, El Salvador
  - coordinates: 13.423288°N 89.085263°W
- Mouth
  - location: Pacific Ocean, San Luis Talpa, La Paz, El Salvador
  - coordinates: 13°25′00″N 89°10′00″W

Comalapa River (Rio Comalapa) is a medium-sized stream in La Paz, El Salvador, which has large to very large quantities of fresh water year round, especially from early May through October.
