= José Damián Villacorta =

Salvadoran lawyer and politician

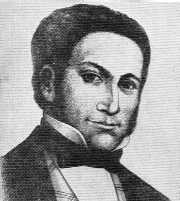

Head of State of El Salvador
- In office 16 February 1830 – 4 December 1830; Acting Head of State
- Vice President: Himself
- Preceded by: José María Cornejo
- Succeeded by: José María Cornejo

2nd Vice Head of State of El Salvador
- In office 30 January 1829 – 3 April 1832
- President: José María Cornejo
- Preceded by: Mariano Prado
- Succeeded by: Joaquín de San Martín (acting)

57th President of the National Assembly of El Salvador
- In office 8 May 1835 – 22 May 1835
- Preceded by: Mariano Antonio de Lara
- Succeeded by: Luis Ayala

13th President of the Supreme Court of Justice of El Salvador
- In office 1851–1857
- Preceded by: José Miguel Montoya
- Succeeded by: Ulloa Cruz

Deputy of the National Assembly of El Salvador
- In office 14 January 1835 – 22 May 1835

Personal details
- Born: José Damián Villacorta Cañas; 1796 Zacatecoluca, San Salvador, New Spain, Spanish Empire
- Died: 11 June 1860 (aged 63–64) Nueva San Salvador, El Salvador
- Party: Independent
- Spouse: Francisca de la Cotera
- Education: University of San Carlos
- Occupation: Politician, lawyer

José Damián Villacorta Cañas (1796 – 11 June 1860) was a Salvadoran politician and lawyer who served as the head of state of El Salvador in 1830, then a part of the Federal Republic of Central America. He also served as the vice head of state of El Salvador from 1829 to 1832, the president of the National Assembly in 1835, and the president of the Supreme Court of Justice from 1851 to 1857.

== Biography ==
José Damián Villacorta Cañas was born in 1796 in Zacatecoluca, San Salvador, then a part of New Spain and the Spanish Empire. His parents were Esteban Gabriel de Villacorta and María Ignacia de Cañas. He attended the University of San Carlos in Guatemala City where he graduated as a licentiate of civil law. He also studied canon law. He married Francisca de la Cotera.

Villacorta was a leader of the independence movement in El Salvador. In 1824, he was a member of Constituent Assembly that drafted El Salvador's first constitution. At some point, Villacorta was a prosecutor for the Supreme Court of Justice of El Salvador.

Villacorta was the vice head of state of El Salvador under Head of State José María Cornejo from 1829 to 1832. During this period, he served as the acting head of state of El Salvador from 16 February to 4 December 1830. In 1832, Villacorta was arrested by Francisco Morazán, the president of the Federal Republic of Central America (of which El Salvador was a member) and he was extradited to Guatemala. He eventually returned to El Salvador and was elected as a deputy of the National Assembly in 1835. He was the president of the National Assembly of El Salvador from 8 to 22 May 1835. After this, he left El Salvador to operate his businesses in Guatemala where he declined an offer to become President of Central America in 1840. Villacorta returned to El Salvador in 1843. At some point, he worked as a law professor at the University of El Salvador and served as its vice rector and later acting rector.

Villacorta served as the president of the Supreme Court of Justice from 1851 to 1858. During his tenure, he helped establish the city of Nueva San Salvador, a city intended to replace San Salvador as El Salvador's capital city following the 1854 earthquake. He moved the Supreme Court of Justice's headquarters to Nueva San Salvador in December 1856. He refused an order from President Gerardo Barrios to move the court to Cojutepeque for which he was sentenced to death.

Villacorta died in Nueva San Salvador, El Salvador on 11 June 1860. He was buried at the Old Belén Church.

== See also ==
- List of heads of state and government who were later imprisoned

Political offices
Preceded by Mariano Prado	Vice Head of State of El Salvador; 1829–1832	Succeeded by Joaquín de San Martín (acting)
Preceded by José María Cornejo	Head of State of El Salvador (acting); 1830	Succeeded by José María Cornejo
Preceded by Mariano Antonio de Lara	President of the National Assembly of El Salvador; 1835	Succeeded by Luis Ayala
Legal offices
Preceded by José Miguel Montoya	President of the Supreme Court of Justice of El Salvador; 1851–1857	Succeeded by Ulloa Cruz
