= Timoteo Menéndez =

Head of state of El Salvador

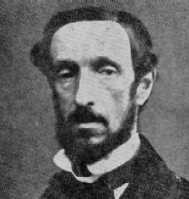

Head of State of El Salvador
- In office 6 January 1838 – 23 May 1838; Acting Head of State
- Preceded by: Diego Vigil Cocaña
- Succeeded by: Antonio José Cañas
- In office 23 May 1837 – 7 June 1837; Acting Head of State
- Preceded by: Diego Vigil Cocaña
- Succeeded by: Diego Vigil Cocaña

Personal details
- Born: Unknown Ahuachapán, New Spain, Spanish Empire
- Died: Unknown El Salvador
- Party: Independent
- Occupation: Politician

Timoteo Menéndez (born in Ahuachapán) was a Salvadoran politician who served twice (1837 and 1838 to 1839) as head of state of El Salvador when it was a state within the Federal Republic of Central America.

He first took over the office from Diego Vigil Cocaña on 23 May 1837, serving for a little over two weeks until 7 June 1837. During these days he continued the fight against the cholera epidemic that had struck the country. He also fought Indigenous insurgents at Zacatecoluca and Cojutepeque, who had attacked the garrison at San Vicente. Because of the revolt he suspended constitutional guarantees in the departments of Cuscatlán and San Vicente. Vigil returned to office on 23 May.

Once again on 6 January 1838, Vigil turned over authority to Menéndez who governed this time for more than a year until 23 May 1839. On 24 February 1838, the Legislative Assembly merged the municipalities of Asunción and Dolores Izalco under the name of Villa Izalco.

On 28 October 1838, conservative General Rafael Carrera, in command of 600 infantry and 200 cavalry from Guatemala, invaded the State of El Salvador. His forces took the cities of Santa Ana and Ahuachapán and committed atrocities. Liberal General Francisco Morazán defeated Carrera at Chiquimula, taking prisoners and capturing military equipment.

On 23 February 1839, forces from Honduras and Nicaragua invaded El Salvador. Menéndez named Morazán General-in-Chief of the Salvadoran Army. On 6 April 1839, Morazán defeated the invading force in the battle of Espiritu Santo.

In accordance with a legislative decree of 22 April 1839, Menéndez prohibited the circulation of coins named maquiquinas and morlacos.

On 23 May 1839 he turned over power to Colonel Antonio José Cañas.

Political offices
Preceded by Diego Vigil Cocaña	Head of State of El Salvador; 1838–1839	Succeeded by Antonio José Cañas
Preceded by Diego Vigil Cocaña	Head of State of El Salvador; 1837	Succeeded by Diego Vigil Cocaña
