= Francisco Gómez (Salvadoran politician) =

President of El Salvador (1796–1838)

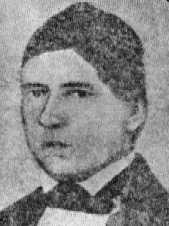
Francisco Gómez, President of El Salvador, 1835–36

Francisco Gómez de Altamirano y de Elizondo (August 5, 1796 in Cartago, Costa Rica – May 17, 1838 in Guatemala) was a Central American licenciado, military officer and Liberal politician. From November 15, 1835 to February 1, 1836 he was chief of state of the state of El Salvador within the Central American Federation.

Gómez's parents were José Luis Goméz de Altamirano y Gazo, a Peninsular, and Bartola de Elizondo, a native of Cartago. He was sent to Metapán, El Salvador as a child.

Later he studied law in Guatemala, becoming a licenciado. Having accumulated some money, he moved back to Metapán, where he married Catalina Rodríguez. He also brought his father, now widowed, to live with him. He was part of the city council of Metapán in November 1811, when the first independence revolt broke out. He joined with the other council members in opposing this, although he was secretly a supporter of independence.

He moved to San Salvador, where he also became a member of the city council. He edited the Instrucciones, in which he expressed very liberal ideas.

Upon the proclamation of independence, he joined the patriot cause and fought in the war against Imperial Mexico (1822–23). He attained the rank of captain.

He was elected a deputy in the Legislature in 1826. Later he returned to the army of the state, when El Salvador and Honduras withdrew recognition of the federal authorities. He served under General Francisco Morazán, whose confidence he gained. He was promoted to colonel. On October 10, 1827 in Izalco he presented to federal President Manuel José Arce El Salvador's peace proposals.

On November 15, 1835, Morazán made him chief of state of El Salvador state, replacing Nicolás Espinoza. He served on an interim basis, until he was replaced by Diego Vigil on February 1, 1836.

Francisco Gómez was assassinated in Guatemala on May 17, 1838.

Political offices
Preceded by Nicolás Espinoza	Head of State of El Salvador (acting); 1835–1836	Succeeded by Diego Vigil Cocaña
