= José María Silva =

President of El Salvador (1804–1876)

Licenciado José María Silva (c. 1804, San Miguel, El Salvador – October 16, 1876, San Miguel) was a Liberal Salvadoran politician. He was twice briefly chief of state of the State of El Salvador, within the Federal Republic of Central America (1834–35 and 1840).

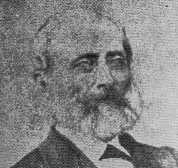
José Maria Silva

Silva was born into a well-to-do family about 1804. In 1827 he received a doctorate in law. He was a deputy to the state legislature in 1828, and its secretary in 1829.

In May 1829 he asked for a military judgment of the prisoners taken at the capitulation of Mejicanos, in the first phase of the Central American Civil War. In June 1829 he moved to Guatemala, as a commissioner of the legislature, charged along with P. Colom with personally delivering to General Francisco Morazán, commander of the victorious revolutionary armies, the decree by which Morazán was to remain in power until the establishment of new federal authorities.

Silva was again a deputy to the Salvadoran Legislature in 1834, and became president of the Legislature in October. From October 14, 1834, to April 10, 1835, he governed El Salvador, as vice-head of state, after the Honduran Joaquín Escolán y Balibrera declined the appointment as head of state. He governed again in the same capacity from February 16, 1840, to April 5, 1840. In his second term he received his authority from General Morazán, when the latter left to invade Guatemala. However, on April 5, 1840, he gave up his office to follow General Morazán into exile, embarking on the brigantine Izalco from the port of La Libertad, La Libertad along with many other followers of Morazán. The Municipal Council of San Salvador took over the executive authority of the state. The Federal Republic of Central America was formally dissolved in 1840.

Licenciado Silva governed with honesty, and ended the seizure of property of opponents of the Liberals. He performed judicial functions and was president of the constituent congress of 1839.

Silva remained in exile in Costa Rica and Panama for two years, returning to El Salvador in 1842. He returned as a private citizen, and lived many years dedicated to his profession as a lawyer. On January 9, 1850, he was named a Salvadoran delegate to the National Convention that was called to reorganize the Central American Union, be he declined the appointment (several times). He was also named a delegate by Honduras. In spite of his refusals, he attended the assembly in León, Nicaragua. On January 9, 1851, he attended another session at Chinandega, where he was named secretary of the assembly.

In 1853 he was elected a senator. By now he was recognized as one of the most outstanding jurists of the country. On June 22, 1854, he was named a member of the commission charged with editing the mercantile code. He was reelected senator from San Miguel, and elected president of the Senate from 1857 to 1858.

On February 4, 1858, the executive authority designated Silva and Dr. Justo Abaunza as a commission charged with editing the civil code and making penal reforms.

In 1862 Silva returned to the Senate and was again elected its president. At the end of this term he retired to private life because of illness.

In 1872 he published the work Recuerdos al 15 de Septiembre (Memories of September 15), considered as his political testament.

Political offices
Preceded by Joaquín Escolán y Balibrera	Head of State of El Salvador (acting); 1834–1835	Succeeded by Nicolás Espinoza
Preceded by Francisco Morazán	Head of State of El Salvador (acting); 1840	Succeeded by Municipal Council of San Salvador (acting)
