= Joaquín Escolán y Balibrera =

Salvadoran politician

Joaquín Escolán y Balibrera (b. San Salvador) was a nineteenth-century Salvadoran politician. Briefly in 1834 he was chief of state of the State of El Salvador, within the Federal Republic of Central America.

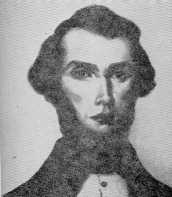

On September 30, 1834 Escolán was designated chief of state of El Salvador. Days later, on October 5, the Legislative Assembly designed the city of San Vicente as the residence of the state authorities, in agreement with Escolán. The Assembly also granted the titles of General of the Army and Benemérito of the Fatherland to General Francisco Morazán.

Escolán served until October 14, 1834 (two weeks), and then turned over the office to José María Silva.

On March 2, 1835, because Dionisio de Herrera had declined the appointment as head of state, Escolán again exercised the executive powers, this time as consejero (councilor). He governed until April 10, 1835. On the latter date, General Nicolás Espinoza, popularly elected, took office.

Political offices
Preceded by Gregorio Salazar	Head of State of El Salvador; 1834	Succeeded by José María Silva
