= Santiago José Celis =

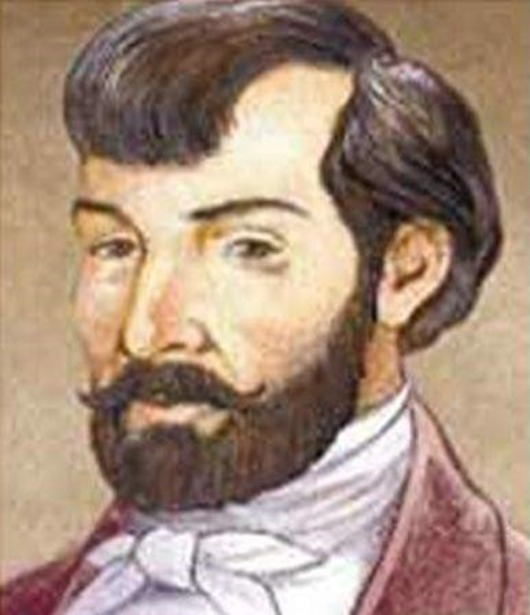
Santiago José Celis

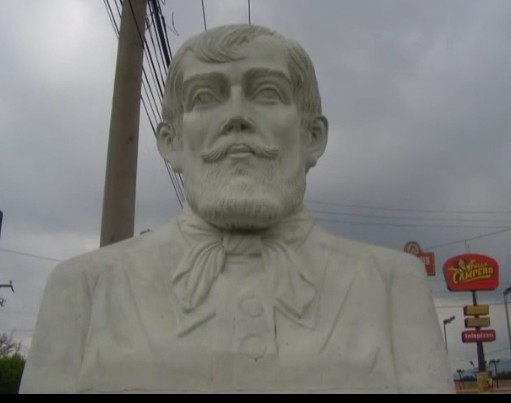
Bust of Celis in San Salvador.

Santiago José Celis (1782 in Ahuachapán – April 16, 1814 in San Salvador, El Salvador) was a Salvadoran physician who participated in the 1811 Independence Movement.

== Biography ==
Celis was born into a Creole family. At a young age he moved to the Guatemalan capital to receive the best possible education of the time. In 1794 he enrolled at the Tridentino School. On the August 16, 1800 he received the rank of Bachelor of Medicine at the Universidad de San Carlos de Guatemala from which he received his master's degree, finally graduating on August 11–12, 1802. His master's degree was partly achieved by his essays and new ideas for the treatment and evolution of gangrenous inflammations. He married Ana Andrade Canes, a relative of Jose Simeón Canes.

As a doctor he promoted the vaccination against smallpox in San Salvador. As a Creole he was aligned to the cause of the Independence of Central America from the colonial powers and joined the independence movement which reached a high on November 5, 1811 in the capital of San Salvador. Celis, active in the revolutionary movement against the Spanish domination, joined a further uprising on January 24, 1814. Two days later, Celis was captured and jailed in Fijo jail in San Salvador. He was incarcerated for almost three months but due to torture he received in prison, he died on April 16, 1814.

== See also ==
- Marina Manzanares Monjarás
