= Manuel Méndez (politician) =

Acting President & Vice President of El Salvador (??–1872)

Licentiate Manuel Méndez
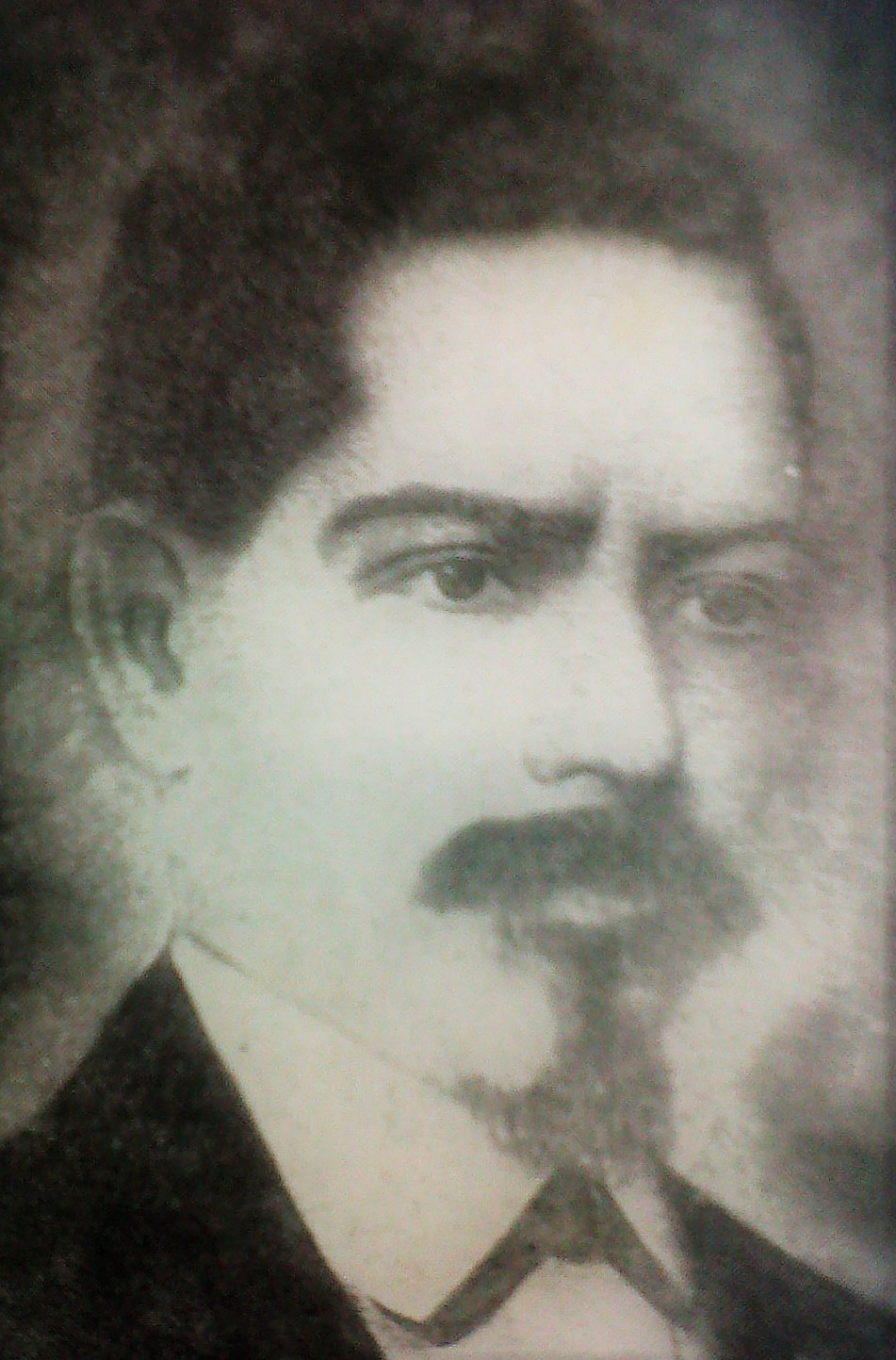
- Méndez in 1872.

20th Vice President of El Salvador
- In office 1 February 1872 – 1 September 1872
- President: Santiago González
- Preceded by: Position vacant (José María Parrilla in 1871)
- Succeeded by: Position vacant (Santiago González in 1876)

President of El Salvador
- In office 10 May 1872 – 16 June 1872; Acting President
- Preceded by: Santiago González
- Succeeded by: Santiago González

Personal details
- Born: Unknown Sensuntepeque, El Salvador
- Died: 1 September 1872 San Salvador, El Salvador
- Manner of death: Assassination
- Party: Independent
- Occupation: Politician

Manuel Méndez (died 1 September 1872) was a Salvadoran politician who served as vice president of El Salvador between February and his assassination in September 1872, as well as serving acting president between May and June 1872. He also served as Minister of the Interior.

== Biography ==
Méndez was elected as vice president of El Salvador and assumed office on 1 February 1872, serving under President Marshal Santiago González. On 10 May, he became acting president on behalf of González, while he commanded an army against Honduran President José María Medina. González resumed his presidential duties on 16 June.

At 9:00 p.m. on 1 September 1872, Méndez was assassinated in San Salvador's main plaza.

Political offices
Preceded by Santiago González	President of El Salvador; 1872 (acting)	Succeeded by Santiago González
Preceded by José María Parrilla	Vice President of El Salvador; 1872	Succeeded by Santiago González
