= Juan Vicente Villacorta =

Central American politician

Juan Vicente Villacorta Díaz
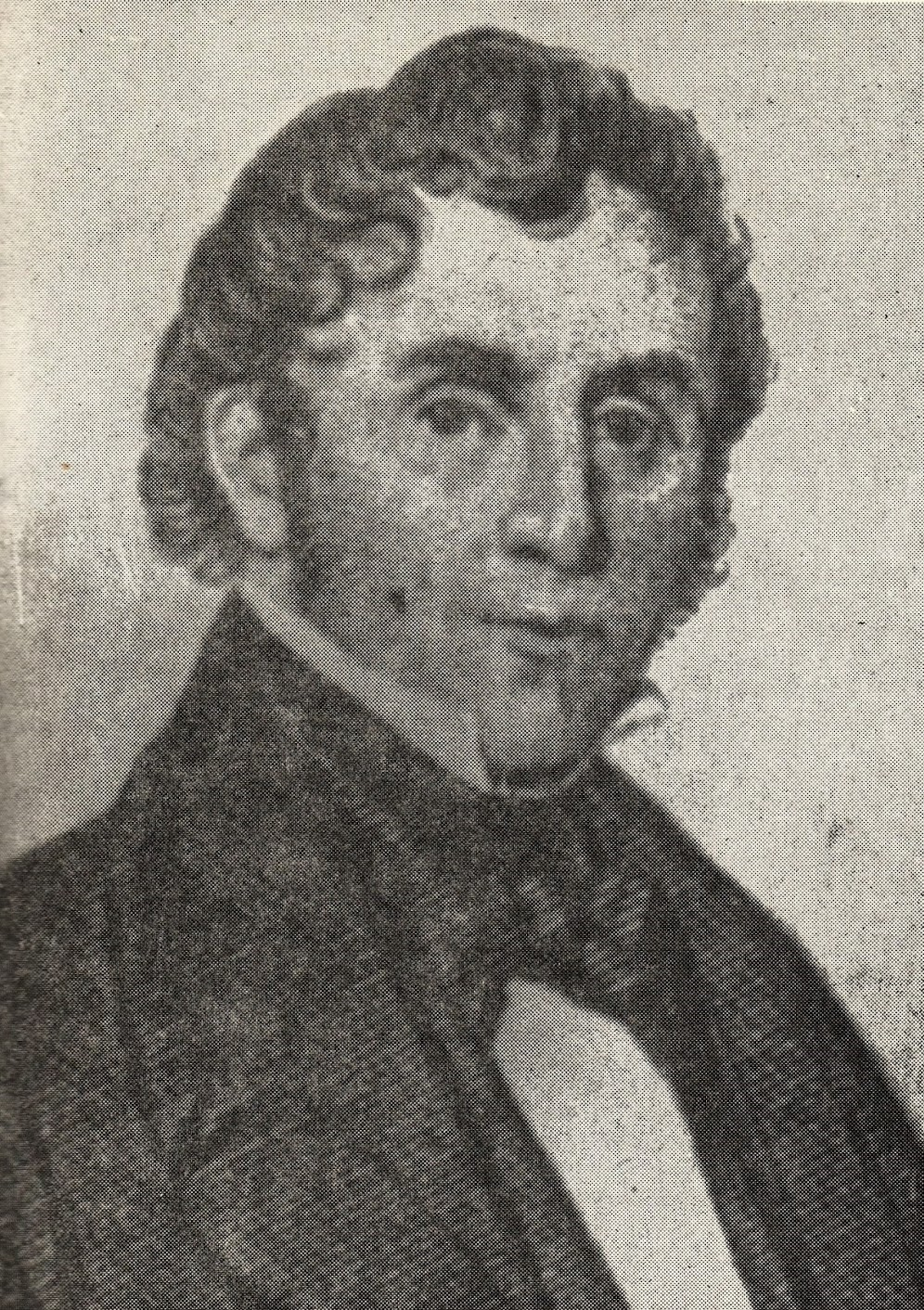

Supreme Chief of El Salvador
- In office 13 December 1824 – 1 November 1826
- Preceded by: Mariano Prado
- Succeeded by: Mariano Prado

Member of the Second Triumvirate of Central America
- In office 6 October 1823 – 15 March 1824

Member of the First Triumvirate of Central America
- In office 10 July 1823 – 4 October 1823

Personal details
- Born: 22 January 1764 Zacatecoluca, New Spain
- Died: 11 January 1828 (aged 63) Guatemala
- Party: Liberal
- Occupation: Politician

Juan Vicente Villacorta Díaz (22 January 1764 – 1 November 1828) was a Central American politician. From 10 July 1823 to 15 March 1824, he was a member of the triumvirates that governed the Federal Republic of Central America. From 13 December 1824 to 1 November 1826, he was head of state of El Salvador while it was a state of the Federal Republic of Central America.

Villacorta was a member of the assembly that met in San Salvador in 1821. He was among the signers of the declaration of independence of Central America and a member of the constituent congress of the United Provinces of Central America in 1823. He formed part of the Supreme Executive Power of the Federation (the First and Second Triumvirates) in 1823–24.

Villacorta became chief of state of El Salvador on 13 December 1824. Mariano Prado was vice chief of state. Villacorta sent 500 troops to help federal President General Manuel José Arce suppress a rebellion in Nicaragua. On 20 April 1825, he introduced the papel sellado, the use of seals on official documents such as contracts, judicial decrees, deeds, etc. A tax was charged for the seals. The same month, he denounced the writings of the Archbishop of Guatemala, Fray Ramón Casaus y Torres, who argued against the recognition of Padre José Matías Delgado as archbishop of San Salvador. As a result, Federal president Arce admonished Casaus, and he suspended his attacks on Delgado.

In 1826 Villacorta approved a decree of the Legislature giving preference for entry into the military academy to sons of individuals who had died in defense of the fatherland in the years 1811, 1814, 1822 and 1823. In October 1826 he sent 300 troops to Guatemala to aid federal President Manuel José Arce. During his administration, El Semanario Político Mercantil was published in El Salvador.

On 1 November 1828, Villacorta died in Guatemala.

Political offices
Preceded by Mariano Prado	Head of State of El Salvador; 1824–1826	Succeeded by Mariano Prado
