= José María Cornejo =

Salvadoran politician

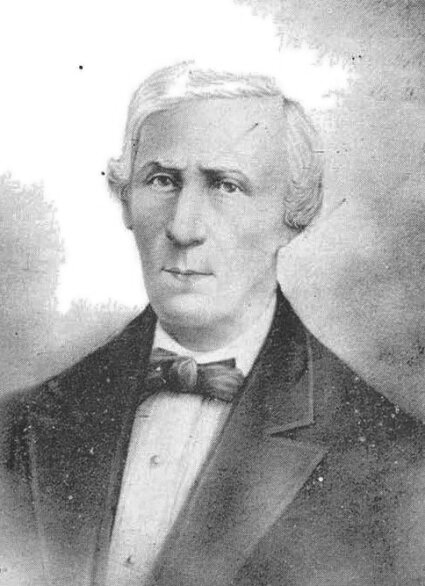

4th Head of State of El Salvador
- In office 4 December 1830 – 3 April 1832
- President: José Francisco Barrundia; Francisco Morazán
- Preceded by: José Damián Villacorta
- Succeeded by: Francisco Morazán
- In office 30 January 1829 – 16 February 1830
- President: Manuel José Arce; Mariano Beltranena y Llano; José Francisco Barrundia
- Preceded by: Mariano Prado
- Succeeded by: José Damián Villacorta

Personal details
- Born: José María Cornejo Merino; 10 November 1788 San Vicente, New Spain
- Died: 24 November 1864 (aged 76) San Vicente, El Salvador
- Party: Conservative
- Spouse: Nicolasa de Lezama
- Parent(s): José María Cornejo; Jacoba Merino
- Occupation: Politician

José María Cornejo y Merino (10 November 1788 – 24 November 1864) was a Salvadoran politician. Two times he served as chief of state of El Salvador (1829–30 and 1830–32).

== Early life ==
Cornejo was born in 1788 to José María Cornejo and Jacoba Merino. He married Nicolasa de Lezama.

In Guatemala he studied philosophy, obtaining a diploma on 14 January 1809. Later he studied canon law, but without graduating, and after that civil law, which he also did not finish. He was in Guatemala when the United Provinces of Central America approved inclusion into the First Mexican Empire of Agustín de Iturbide. Because Cornejo opposed this union, he was sent to prison. He was freed in June 1822, and returned to El Salvador.

== Career ==
He was a deputy to the state congress in 1826, 1827 and 1828, when El Salvador was part of the Federal Republic of Central America. Attaining considerable fame, he also became mayor of San Vicente and permanent councilman.

When elections for chief of state were convoked among the towns, Cornejo was the winner. He took possession of the government (still a state within the federation) on 30 January 1829 and governed for a little more than a year, to 16 February 1830.

He served a second term from 4 December 1830 to 30 April 1832. Federal President Francisco Morazán transferred the capital of the Federation from Guatemala City to San Salvador in December 1831, but because of opposition from Cornejo (who opposed the federation), Morazán was forced to leave San Salvador on January 6, 1832. He went to Honduras, where he awaited the arrival of more troops from Nicaragua to reenter El Salvador.

Together with Manuel José Arce Cornejo proclaimed the separation of El Salvador from the Union in 1832. On 17 March of that year the Salvadoran town of Chalatenango pronounced against Cornejo and in favor of the federal government. The town of Metapán did likewise.
Morazán attacked San Miguel, El Salvador on 28 February 1832. On 14 March 1832 in the Battle of Jocoro, he defeated Cornejo. On 28 March he defeated him again at San Salvador. Cornejo was taken prisoner and Morazán took over direct control of El Salvador. He called elections for a constituent assembly, which subsequently elected Mariano Prado chief of state and Joaquín de San Martín vice chief of state.

Cornejo was locked up in the San Francisco convent in Guatemala and never returned to politics.

Political offices
Preceded by Mariano Prado	Head of State of El Salvador; 1829-1830	Succeeded by José Damián Villacorta
Preceded by José Damián Villacorta	Head of State of El Salvador; 1830-1832	Succeeded by Francisco Morazán
