= Joaquín de San Martín =

Salvadoran military officer and politician

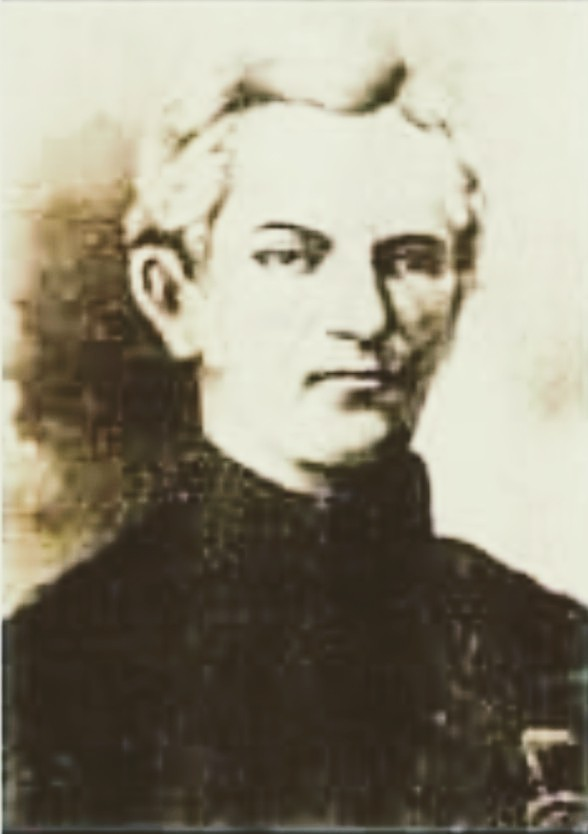
Joaquín de San Martín, Chief of State of El Salvador, 1832 and 1833-34

Colonel Joaquín de San Martín y Ulloa (sometimes Joaquín San Martín) (1770 in Comayagua, Honduras – November 29, 1854 in Department of Chalatenango) was a Salvadoran military officer and politician who was twice chief of state of the State of El Salvador, within the Federal Republic of Central America (1832 and 1833–34).

Joaquín de San Martín was a lieutenant of dragoons in Yoro and an official in the governments of Tegucigalpa and Nacaome. In 1819 he moved permanently to El Salvador, with his wife Joaquina Fugón. He was elected deputy from Tejutla and Chalatenango, where he held extensive rural properties, in 1824.

He joined the Salvadoran army, and was promoted to colonel. He was magistrate of the Court of Justice from December 24, 1824 to March 1, 1830. By vote of the towns he was elected vice-chief of state under Mariano Prado in 1832, and from May 13, 1832 to July 25, 1834 he exercised the functions of chief of state. He left office on the latter date when Prado returned to power. Prado served until July 1, 1833, when San Martín again became president. His second term continued until June 23, 1834.

During his administration, he suppressed the Nonualco Indigenous revolt led by Anastasio Aquino. He also dealt with several military revolts. With the aid of Captain Ramón Belloso and his company, San Martín also suppressed the hordes of thieves dominating the country, many of whom had tried to join with Aquino to contest governmental authority. On February 13, 1833, San Martín decreed an amnesty for the rebel Nonualco Indians.

In March 1833, General Francisco Morazán joined with rebel forces against San Martín. On April 6, 1833 San Martín and Morazán signed an agreement reconciling their differences.

On July 1, 1833 the Congress of the state reorganized the Salvadoran government, making San Martín chief of state for a second time, and Lorenzo González vice chief of state. This election was annulled by the federal Congress. Nevertheless, his second term continued until June 23, 1834. On that date, General Carlos Salazar, imposed by Morazán, took over the government.

González was assassinated in his hacienda La Asunción in May 1834. San Martín was condemned to two years of exile and the confiscation of his property. On his return to the country he was deputy to the constituent congress of the state, from 1840 to 1841, and afterwards vice president.

Colonel San Martín distinguished himself as a defender of the law during the tragic days of September 1841, when General Francisco Malespín staged a coup d'état and overthrew the legal president, Antonio José Cañas.

San Martín died in 1854 at the age of 84 at his hacienda Amayo. His son José María San Martín was president of independent El Salvador in 1852 and again in 1854-56.

Political offices
Preceded by Francisco Morazán	Head of State of El Salvador (acting); 1832	Succeeded by Mariano Prado
Preceded by Mariano Prado	Head of State of El Salvador (acting); 1833–1834	Succeeded by Carlos Salazar
