= Mariano Prado =

Central American lawyer and chief of state

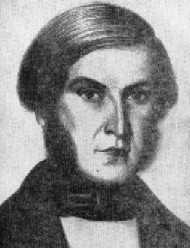

2nd & 6th Head of State of El Salvador
- In office 25 July 1832 – 1 July 1833
- Preceded by: Joaquín de San Martín
- Succeeded by: Joaquín de San Martín
- In office 1 November 1826 – 30 January 1829; Acting Head of State
- Preceded by: Juan Villacorta Díaz
- Succeeded by: José María Cornejo
- In office 1 October 1824 – 13 December 1824
- Preceded by: Juan Manuel Rodríguez
- Succeeded by: Juan Villacorta Díaz

Political Chief of El Salvador
- In office 25 May 1823 – 22 April 1824; Provisional Political Chief
- Preceded by: Felipe Codallos
- Succeeded by: Juan Manuel Rodríguez as Head of State

Personal details
- Born: Mariano Prado Baca; 1776 León, Captaincy General of Guatemala
- Died: 1837 (aged 60–61) Guatemala, Federal Republic of Central America
- Party: Liberal
- Occupation: Politician, lawyer

Mariano Prado Baca (1776 – 1837) was a Central American lawyer and a four-time, liberal chief of state of El Salvador, while it was a state in the Federal Republic of Central America (1823–24, 1824, 1826–29 and 1832–33).

== Biography ==
Born in Nicaragua to José de la Trinidad Prado and Clara Baca, Prado moved with his family at a young age to San Vicente, El Salvador. He spent some years in the Regiment Fijo de Bandera, but then decided to pursue a career in civil law. He received his law degree in 1797. He became a city councilman in San Vicente, where he owned considerable rural property. On June 30, 1809 he married Engracia Vasconcelos in San Vicente.

Prado repudiated the revolution of 1811. After the proclamation of independence in 1821, he opposed the union of the province of El Salvador with the Mexican Empire. He was one of the outstanding figures in the political party later called "Exaltado" (Exalted). He was a deputy in the provincial congress of 1822. As political chief of San Salvador he organized the civic militia during a time of threat to the capital by an invasion from Guatemala. (El Salvador had seceded from Guatemala in order to avoid incorporation into Mexico.) On February 7, 1823 the defenders evacuated San Salvador. Prado took command of one of the military columns in the retreat. They camped at his hacienda, "Santa Catalina", near San Vicente, and then continued to march toward Honduras. They surrendered a short time later at Gualcince.

On the fall of Emperor Agustín de Iturbide, and of the Mexican Empire itself, El Salvador regained sovereignty. Prado occupied the political leadership of San Salvador and presided over the Consultative Governmental Junta of the Province of San Salvador. He governed as provisional chief from June 17, 1823 to April 22, 1824. He served a second, brief, period as provisional chief executive of the state from October 1, 1824 to December 13, 1824.

A third term followed, from November 1, 1826 to January 30, 1829. During this period (in 1826), El Salvador broke relations with the federal government in Guatemala City. Once again, El Salvador was invaded from Guatemala, in a civil war that lasted until 1829.

He was succeeded by José María Cornejo, a conservative, who withdrew El Salvador from the Federation. This led to another invasion by federal troops, under Francisco Morazán. Morazán deposed Cornejo and put Prado back in power. During his fourth term, which lasted from July 25, 1832 to July 1, 1833, there was an Indian uprising led by Anastasio Aquino. In the church of San Vicente Aquino was crowned King of the Nonualcos.

Political offices
Preceded by Consultive Junta	Political Chief of El Salvador (provisional); 1823–1824	Succeeded by Juan Manuel Rodríguez
Preceded by Juan Manuel Rodríguez	Head of State of El Salvador; 1824	Succeeded by Juan Vicente Villacorta
Preceded by Juan Vicente Villacorta	Head of State of El Salvador (acting); 1826–1829	Succeeded by José María Cornejo
Preceded by Joaquín de San Martín	Head of State of El Salvador; 1832–1833	Succeeded by Joaquín de San Martín
