= Rafael Campo =

8th President of El Salvador (1856–1858)

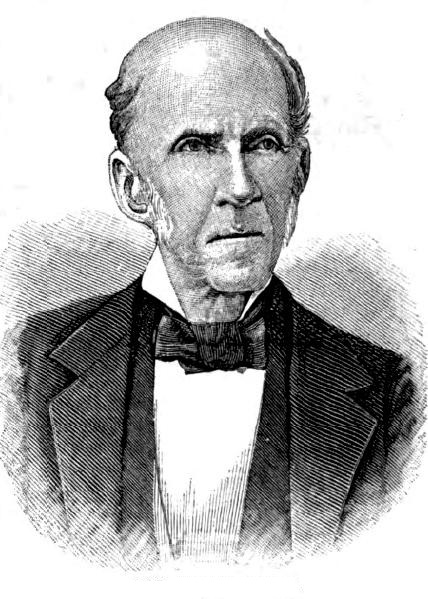

8th President of El Salvador
- In office 19 July 1856 – 1 February 1858
- Vice President: Francisco Dueñas
- Preceded by: José María San Martín
- Succeeded by: Miguel Santín del Castillo
- In office 12 February 1856 – 12 May 1856
- Vice President: Francisco Dueñas
- Preceded by: José María San Martín
- Succeeded by: Francisco Dueñas (acting)

100th President of the Constituent Assembly of El Salvador
- In office 1871–1871
- Preceded by: Rafael Zaldívar
- Succeeded by: Doroteo Vasconcelos

Deputy of the National Assembly of El Salvador from Sonsonate
- In office 1842–1842

Personal details
- Born: Rafael Juan Campo y Pomar; 24 October 1813 Sonsonate, then in the Intendancy of San Salvador
- Died: 1 March 1890 (aged 76) Acajutla, El Salvador
- Party: Conservative
- Education: University of San Carlos
- Occupation: Politician, businessman, journalist

Rafael Juan Campo y Pomar (24 October 1813 – 1 March 1890) was a Salvadoran politician, businessman, and journalist who served as the 8th President of El Salvador from 1856 to 1858. He also served as the president of the Constituent Assembly in 1871.

Campo spent his early political career in Sonsonate and as a member of the National Assembly. He won the 1856 presidential election and assumed the presidency on 12 February 1856. He briefly left office between 12 May to 19 July, during which, Vice President Francisco Dueñas served as acting president. Campo was president during the Filibuster War and sent soldiers to help Nicaragua defeat William Walker. His government survived multiple coups led by liberal General Gerardo Barrios and negotiated a settlement to put Barrios fourth in the presidential line of succession for the 1858–1860 presidential term. Campo left office on 1 February 1858 and was succeeded by General Miguel Santín del Castillo.

After Campo's presidency, he was exiled from El Salvador several times for opposing the presidencies of Barrios, Dueñas, Marshal Santiago González, and Rafael Zaldívar. In exile, he founded two newspapers that were critical of Dueñas and González. He returned to Sonsonate in 1882 and he died in Acajutla in 1890.

== Early life ==
Rafael Juan Campo y Pomar was born on 24 October 1813 in Sonsonate, then in the Intendancy of San Salvador. His parents were Pedro Campo y Pérez de Arpa and Juana María del Pomar. His father was a colonel in the Spanish Army. Campo had several siblings. In his youth, Campo was home schooled and later attended classes at a Franciscan convent in Sonsonate. Campo attended the University of San Carlos in Guatemala City. Campo's family was wealthy and paid for his education.

In 1834, Campo lost much of his wealth and went into debt due to his father's death, the sinking of his boat La Joven Ángela that lost many of his possessions in the process, and the political instability of the Federal Republic of Central America. To recover financially, Campo bought coffee seeds from Costa Rica and established a plantation on the shore of Lake Coatepeque.

== Early political career ==
In 1840, Campo was an elector for the Sonsonate municipal election. He was elected as a deputy to the National Assembly of El Salvador (lower house) in 1842 and he was also a presidential candidate in the 1842 presidential election. In 1843, he was a regidor (council member) on the Sonsonate ayuntamiento (municipal council), and at some point, he also served as its syndic.

By 1851, he was a member of the Senate (upper house). In 1851, he was a senator who was part of the prosecution against President Doroteo Vasconcelos. Vasconcelos was put on trial for being unconstitutionally re-elected as President of El Salvador in the 1850 presidential election and for leading El Salvador into a war with Guatemala that ended in a military defeat at the Battle of La Arada.

== President of El Salvador ==
In 1856, the conservative Republican Party nominated Campo for President of El Salvador. He won the 1856 presidential election on 30 January, becoming president-elect. Campo resigned from the Senate and assumed the presidency on 12 February. He succeeded Francisco Dueñas, his vice president who had served as acting president from 1 to 12 February after he succeeded outgoing president General José María San Martín. Campo appointed Enrique Hoyo as General Minister. During Campo's presidency, his government was headquartered in Cojutepeque instead of the capital San Salvador as the latter was destroyed by an earthquake in 1854.

In April 1856, Campo established a finance committee tasked with managing public works and purchasing weapons and clothing for the Salvadoran Army. That month, General Ramón Belloso resigned as commander of Salvadoran forces in Nicaragua and Campo replaced him with General Gerardo Barrios. Campo also put Barrios in command of the 4th Division. Campo handed the presidency to Dueñas on 12 May. While acting president, Dueñas mobilized 700 Salvadoran soldiers to fight William Walker during the Filibuster War in Nicaragua in June. Dueñas returned the presidency to Campo on 19 July. Campo sent 1,700 more soldiers to Nicaragua in September. Campo survived an October coup attempt led by liberals Barrios, General José Trinidad Cabañas, and José María Zelaya. Campo later pardoned Barrios and appointed him as Minister of Interior Relations.

On 7 June 1857, Barrios returned from Nicaragua after and landed in La Libertad where he declared his intention to march on Cojutepeque. Campo fired Barrios and placed himself in command of the army, to which Barrios proclaimed himself president and marched on Cojutepeque. Before a military confrontation, San Martín negotiated a settlement between Campo and Barrios. They agreed that during the next presidential term of 1858 to 1860, General Joaquín Eufrasio Guzmán (Barrios' father-in-law) would serve as vice president and Barrios would serve as the second presidential designate (fourth in the presidential line of succession).

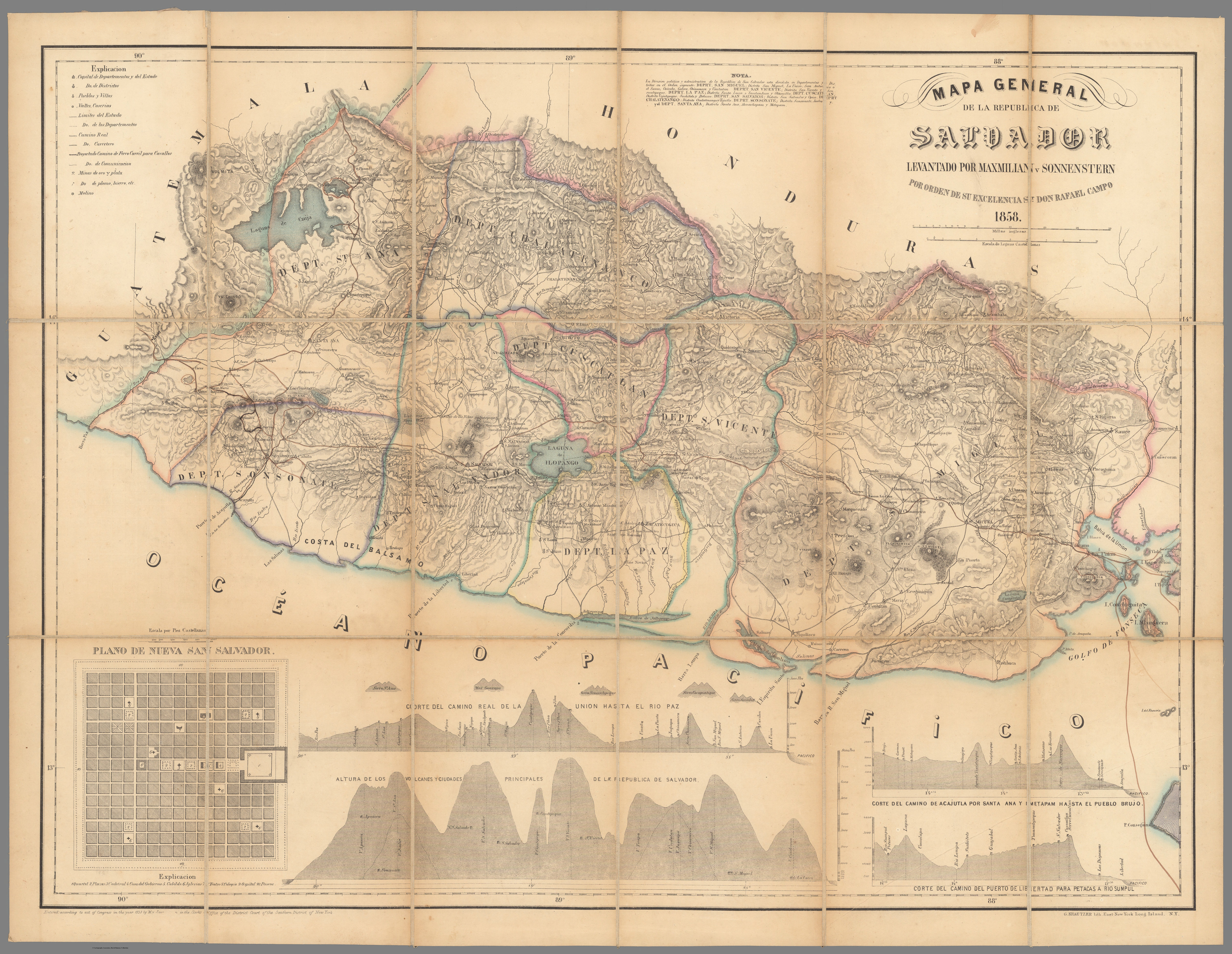
The topographic map of El Salvador created by Maximiliano von Sonnestern and commissioned by Rafael Campo

On 25 January 1858, the National Assembly elected General Miguel Santín del Castillo as the next president of El Salvador. Campo left office on 1 February and was succeeded by Senator Lorenzo Zepeda, one of Campo's allies, in an acting capacity until Santín assumed office on 7 February. During Campo's presidency, he ordered the creation of a topographic map of El Salvador. This map was completed by German engineer Maximilian von Sonnestern during Santín's presidency in 1858 and published in New York City.

== Post-presidency ==
Campo returned to Sonsonate and briefly retired from politics after he left the presidency. He was an elector in the Sonsonate municipal election in 1862. Campo opposed Barrios after he became President of El Salvador in 1859. Barrios accused Campo of treason and supporting conservative Guatemalan president Rafael Carrera leading to Campo fleeing for exile in Guatemala. There, Campo supported Dueñas as the leading opposition figure to Barrios. Campo signed the Act of Santa Ana on 10 July 1863 that recognized Dueñas as the provisional president of El Salvador. Dueñas named Campo as Minister of External Relations on 8 September, but Campo declined the appointment. Salvadoran rebels deposed Barrios on 26 October and installed Dueñas as president. Campo was appointed as the first presidential designate (third in the presidential line of succession).

Campo helped organize municipal elections in Sonsonate in 1864 and 1865. He was also a presidential candidate in the 1864 presidential election but won no more than 20 votes, all from Sonsonate Department. In 1866, Campo visited Spain and met Queen Isabella II at his cousin's palace, the Marquess of Campo. He also traveled to France, Switzerland, Italy, and the Papal States where he met Pope Pius XI. He returned to El Salvador in 1868. He helped organize two more Sonsonate municipal elections in 1868 and 1869. Campo became critical of Dueñas' government and left El Salvador for exile in Chinandega, Nicaragua in 1870. There, he established the La Trompeta newspaper that criticized Dueñas' government. Campo returned to El Salvador in 1871 after Dueñas was overthrown by Marshal Santiago González.

Campo was the president of the 5th Constituent Assembly and the first presidential designate in 1871. Campo became critical of González's government, and in July 1872, he left El Salvador back to exile in Nicaragua where he settled in León. He established the La Coyunda newspaper to criticize González's government. In 1876, President Rafael Zaldívar wanted to appoint Campo as Minister of State, but Campo declined the appointment. He returned to El Salvador in 1879, upon which, he was arrested and imprisoned for 22 days for no apparent reason. When freed, he returned to Nicaragua and wrote the book Corrections to the Historical Review of Lorenzo Montúfar.

== Later life and death ==
Campo returned to Sonsonate in 1882. He was an advisor to the city's charity board. He established the Sonsonate Hospital and a hospice. He also helped finance the construction of a railroad in Western El Salvador centered around the port of Acajutla. Campo died on 1 March 1890 in Acajutla at the age of 76.

On 15 September 1898, the municipal government of Sonsonate opened a park and named it after Campo. The Rafael Campos [sic] Society of Workers trade union, named after Campo, existed in Sonsonate during the 1920s. In September 1932, the Salvadoran government opened the Rafael Campos [sic] Indian School between Sonsonate and Izalco. The school sought to "[improve] the social, moral, intellectual, and economic life of the Indigenous class of Sonsonate Department" but was also tasked with providing aid to Indigenous children orphaned by government mass killings of Indigenous Salvadorans committed earlier that year during La Matanza. A portrait of Campo is located inside Red Chamber of the National Palace of El Salvador alongside portraits of former presidents Manuel Enrique Araujo, Gerardo Barrios, Fernando Figueroa, Francisco Menéndez, and Francisco Morazán.

== See also ==
- List of heads of state and government who have been in exile

Political offices
Preceded by Francisco Dueñas (acting)	President of El Salvador; 1856	Succeeded by Francisco Dueñas (acting)
Preceded by Francisco Dueñas (acting)	President of El Salvador; 1856–1858	Succeeded by Lorenzo Zepeda (acting)
Preceded by Rafael Zaldívar	President of the Constituent Assembly of El Salvador; 1871	Succeeded by Doroteo Vasconcelos
