= Vice President of El Salvador =

Political position in El Salvador

Vice President of the Republic of El Salvador
- Vicepresidente de la República de El Salvador
- Coat of arms of El Salvador

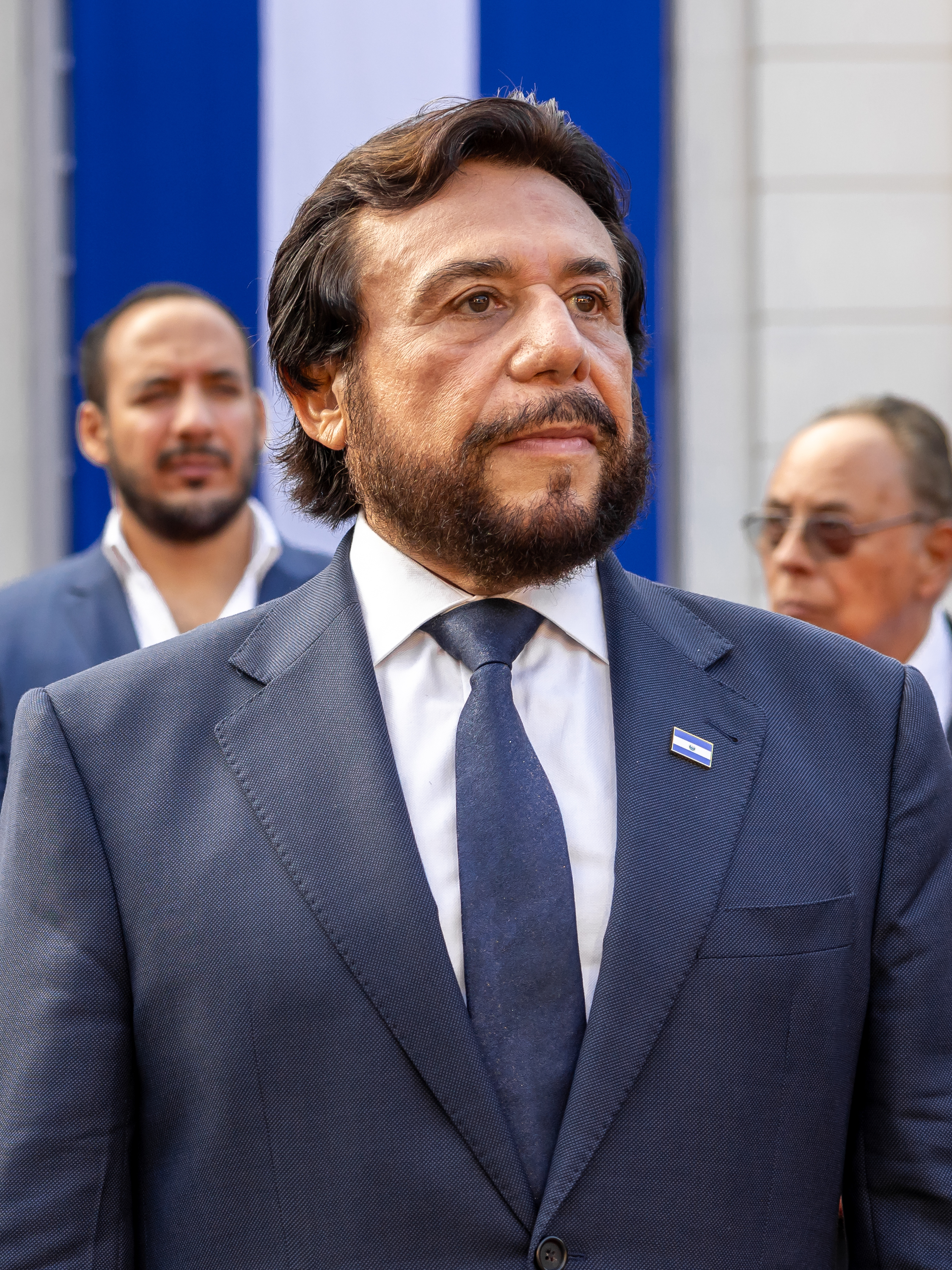
- Incumbent; Félix Ulloa since 1 June 2019
- Style: Mr./Madam Vice President (Señor/a Vicepresidente/a) (informal)
- Term length: Five years, renewable indefinitely
- Constituting instrument: Constitution of El Salvador
- Inaugural holder: Pedro José Arce
- Formation: September 1842

The vice president of El Salvador (Spanish: Vicepresidente de El Salvador) is a political position in El Salvador which is elected concurrently with the position of President of El Salvador.

Historically the vice presidency has been a popularly elected position. Additionally there has been presidential designates (Designados a la Presidencia) elected by the legislature. The constitution of 1841 outlined presidential designates. The 1880 constitution abolished the position of Vice President. The position was brought back in the 1886 constitution.

A list of the office holders follows. The list may not be complete.

== List of vice presidents ==
No.	Portrait	Name (Birth–Death)	Term of office			Political affiliation	President	Refs.
No.	Portrait	Name (Birth–Death)	Took office	Left office	Time in office	Political affiliation	President	Refs.
1		Pedro José Arce (1801–1871)	September 1842	7 February 1844	–	Independent	Juan José Guzmán Cayetano Antonio Molina Pedro José Arce Cayetano Antonio Molina Pedro José Arce Fermín Palacios	
2		Luis Ayala (1801–1883)	7 February 1844	29 February 1844	22 days	Independent	Francisco Malespín	
3		Joaquín Eufrasio Guzmán (1801–1875)	29 February 1844	1 February 1846	1 year and 338 days	Independent	Francisco Malespín Joaquín Eufrasio Guzmán	
4		José Campo (1806–1881)	1 February 1846	1 February 1848	2 years and 0 days	Independent	Eugenio Aguilar	
5		José Félix Quirós (1811–1883)	1 February 1848	1 February 1852	4 years and 0 days	Independent	Tomás Medina José Félix Quirós Doroteo Vasconcelos Ramón Rodríguez Doroteo Vasconcelos Francisco Dueñas José Félix Quirós Francisco Dueñas José María San Martín	
6		Tomás Medina (1803–1884)	1 February 1852	1 February 1854	2 years and 0 days	Independent	Francisco Dueñas	
7		José Mariano Hernández (1786–1864)	1 February 1854	1 February 1856	2 years and 0 days	Independent	Vicente Gómez José María San Martín	
8		Francisco Dueñas (1810–1884)	1 February 1856	1 February 1858	2 years and 0 days	Conservative	Francisco Dueñas Rafael Campo	
9		Joaquín Eufrasio Guzmán (1801–1875)	1 February 1858	1 February 1860	2 years and 0 days	Independent	Lorenzo Zepeda Miguel Santín del Castillo Joaquín Eufrasio Guzmán José María Peralta Gerardo Barrios	
10		José Félix Quirós (1811–1883)	1 February 1860	23 October 1863	3 years and 264 days	Independent	Gerardo Barrios	
No Vice President (23 October 1863 – 1 February 1865)
11		Gregorio Arbizú (1823–1872)	1 February 1865	1 February 1869	4 years and 0 days	Independent	Francisco Dueñas	
12		José María Parrilla (1807–1883)	1 February 1869	15 April 1871	2 years and 73 days	Independent	Francisco Dueñas	
No Vice President (15 April 1871 – 1 February 1872)
13		Manuel Méndez (?–1872)	1 February 1872	1 September 1872	213 days	Independent	Santiago González	
No Vice President (1 September 1872 – 1 February 1876)
14		Santiago González (1818–1887)	1 February 1876	1 May 1876	90 days	Liberal	Andrés del Valle	
No Vice President (1 May 1876 – 1 March 1887)
15		Baltasar Estupinián (1854–1922)	1 March 1887	17 March 1887	16 days	Liberal	Francisco Menéndez	
No Vice President (17 March 1887 – 1 March 1891)
16		Antonio Ezeta (?–?)	1 March 1891	9 June 1894	3 years and 100 days	Liberal	Carlos Ezeta	
No Vice President (9 June 1894 – 1 March 1895)
17		Prudencio Alfaro (1861–1915)	1 March 1895	13 November 1898	3 years and 257 days	Liberal	Rafael Antonio Gutiérrez	
No Vice President (14 November 1898 – 1 March 1899)
18		Francisco Antonio Reyes Gálvez (1860–1951)	1 March 1899	1 March 1903	4 years and 0 days	Liberal	Tomás Regalado	
19		Calixto Velado Eduardo (1855–1927)	1 March 1903	1 March 1907	4 years and 0 days	Conservative	Pedro José Escalón	
20		Manuel Enrique Araujo (1865–1913)	1 March 1907	1 March 1911	4 years and 0 days	Independent	Fernando Figueroa	
21		Onofre Durán Santillana (1836–1914)	1 March 1911	9 February 1913	1 year and 345 days	Independent	Manuel Enrique Araujo	
No Vice President (9 February 1913 – 1 March 1915)
22		Alfonso Quiñónez Molina (1874–1950)	1 March 1915	1 March 1923	8 years and 0 days	National Democratic Party	Carlos Meléndez Ramirez Alfonso Quiñónez Molina Jorge Meléndez	
23		Pío Romero Bosque (1860–1935)	1 March 1923	1 March 1927	4 years and 0 days	National Democratic Party	Alfonso Quiñónez Molina	
24		Gustavo Vides (?–?)	1 March 1927	1 March 1931	4 years and 0 days	National Democratic Party	Pío Romero Bosque	
25		Maximiliano Hernández Martínez (1882–1966)	1 March 1931	2 December 1931	276 days	National Republican Party	Arturo Araujo	
No Vice President (2 December 1931 – 1 March 1945)
26		Manuel Adriano Vilanova (1873–?)	1 March 1945	14 December 1948	3 years and 288 days	Unification Social Democratic Party	Salvador Castaneda Castro	
No Vice President (14 December 1948 – October 1950)
27		José María Peralta Salazar (1907–?)	October 1950	14 September 1956		Revolutionary Party of Democratic Unification	Óscar Osorio	No vice president, Peralta was elected as the presidential designate
28		Humberto Costa (1906–?)	14 September 1956	26 October 1960		Revolutionary Party of Democratic Unification	José María Lemus	
No Vice President (26 October 1960 – 25 January 1962)
29		Francisco José Guerrero (1925–1989)	25 January 1962	1 July 1962	156 days	National Conciliation Party	Eusebio Rodolfo Cordón Cea	
29		Salvador Ramírez Siliézar (?–?)	25 January 1962	1 July 1962	156 days	Independent	Eusebio Rodolfo Cordón Cea	
30		Francisco Roberto Lima (1917–2008)	1 July 1962	1 July 1967	5 years and 0 days	National Conciliation Party	Julio Adalberto Rivera Carballo	
31		Humberto Guillermo Cuestas (1921–2005)	1 July 1967	1 July 1972	5 years and 0 days	National Conciliation Party	Fidel Sánchez Hernández	
32		Enrique Mayorga Rivas (1926–1987)	1 July 1972	1 July 1977	5 years and 0 days	National Conciliation Party	Arturo Armando Molina	
33		Julio Ernesto Astacio (born 1932)	1 July 1977	15 October 1979	2 years and 106 days	National Conciliation Party	Carlos Humberto Romero	
No Vice President (15 October 1979 – 13 December 1980)
34		Jaime Abdul Gutiérrez (1936–2012)	13 December 1980	2 May 1982	1 year and 140 days	Military	Revolutionary Government Junta (José Napoleón Duarte)	
35		Raúl Molina Martínez (born 1938)	2 May 1982	1 June 1984	2 years and 60 days	National Conciliation Party	Álvaro Magaña	
35		Mauricio Gutiérrez Castro (born 1942)	2 May 1982	1 June 1984	2 years and 60 days	Nationalist Republican Alliance	Álvaro Magaña	
35		Pablo Mauricio Alvergue (1930–2024)	2 May 1982	1 June 1984	2 years and 60 days	Christian Democratic Party	Álvaro Magaña	
36		Rodolfo Antonio Castillo Claramount (born 1936)	1 June 1984	1 June 1989	5 years and 0 days	Christian Democratic Party	José Napoleón Duarte	
37		José Francisco Merino López (born 1952)	1 June 1989	1 June 1994	5 years and 0 days	Nationalist Republican Alliance	Alfredo Cristiani	
38		Enrique Borgo Bustamante (1928–2025)	1 June 1994	1 June 1999	5 years and 0 days	Nationalist Republican Alliance	Armando Calderón Sol	
39		Carlos Quintanilla Schmidt (born 1953)	1 June 1999	1 June 2004	5 years and 0 days	Nationalist Republican Alliance	Francisco Flores Pérez	
40		Ana Vilma de Escobar (born 1954)	1 June 2004	1 June 2009	5 years and 0 days	Nationalist Republican Alliance	Antonio Saca	
41		Salvador Sánchez Cerén (born 1944)	1 June 2009	1 June 2014	5 years and 0 days	Farabundo Martí National Liberation Front	Mauricio Funes	
42		Óscar Ortiz (born 1961)	1 June 2014	1 June 2019	5 years and 0 days	Farabundo Martí National Liberation Front	Salvador Sánchez Cerén	
43		Félix Ulloa (born 1951)	1 June 2019	Incumbent	7 years and 121 days	Independent Nuevas Ideas	Nayib Bukele	

== See also ==
- List of current vice presidents
