= 1858 Salvadoran presidential election =

- 25 January 1858
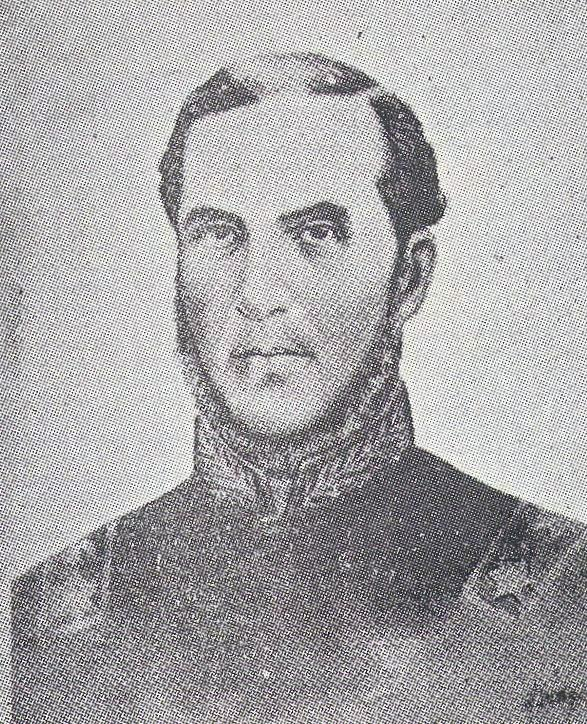
Candidate	Miguel Santín del Castillo
Party	Conservative
Running mate	Joaquín Eufrasio Guzmán
President before election
Lorenzo Zepeda
Independent
Elected President
Miguel Santín del Castillo
Conservative

Presidential elections were held in El Salvador on 26 January 1856. Miguel Santín del Castillo ran unopposed and was elected by the legislature. Born in 1830, he was the youngest ever president of El Salvador, elected at the age of 28.

== Results ==
Candidate	Party
Miguel Santín del Castillo	Conservative
Total
Source: University of California, San Diego
