= 1854 San Salvador earthquake =

Earthquake in El Salvador

- Location within El Salvador
- Local date: 16 April 1854
- Local time: 10:50 p.m.
- Duration: 10 seconds
- Magnitude: 6.5–6.6 M_{L}
- Epicenter: 13.681°N 89.135°W near San Jacinto
- Areas affected: San Salvador
- Total damage: San Salvador destroyed
- Foreshocks: Yes
- Aftershocks: Yes
- Casualties: <100 killed ~50 injured

On 16 April 1854, an earthquake hit San Salvador, the capital city of El Salvador. The earthquake measured 6.5–6.6 on the Richter scale. It killed no more than 100 people and destroyed San Salvador, forcing the country's government to temporarily relocate to Cojutepeque while it built a new capital city at Nueva San Salvador (modern-day Santa Tecla). In 1858, the government decided to return to San Salvador rather than relocate to Nueva San Salvador.

== Earthquakes ==
On 13 April 1854, residents of San Salvador felt a small earthquake and reported that it sounded like heavy artillery rolling on pavement or like distant thunder. The earthquake did not impact that day's Holy Thursday celebrations. At 9:30 p.m. on 16 April (Easter), a stronger earthquake hit San Salvador and forced many people to flee their homes and set up temporary encampments in public plazas.

Later that night, the strongest earthquake hit San Salvador at 10:50 p.m. The 10-second-long earthquake measured 6.5 or 6.6 on the Richter scale and had an epicenter near the neighborhood of San Jacinto. Several prominent buildings were destroyed, including the Metropolitan Cathedral of San Salvador and the University of El Salvador. A document issued by Spanish king Charles I in 1543 that granted San Salvador its status as a city was also destroyed in the Municipal Archive of San Salvador. The destruction of buildings produced a cloud of dust across the city. According to an account written by the Salvadoran government on 2 May, the earthquake destroyed virtually all homes in the city. The earthquake induced volcanic activity from the San Salvador volcano. Several aftershocks occurred through the following weeks.

== Casualties ==
The earthquake trapped at least a quarter of San Salvador's population under rubble, including over 100 students at the University of El Salvador. Victims crowded the city's hospitals and barracks. No more than 100 people were killed by the earthquake and around 50 more were injured. Among those injured included Tomás Miguel Pineda y Saldaña, the bishop of San Salvador; Francisco Dueñas, a former president of El Salvador; and a daughter of General José María San Martín, the incumbent president. The government expected that casualties would be higher, but residents leaving their homes for encampments in public plazas saved many lives.

== Aftermath ==
The earthquake destroyed San Salvador. The damage was so severe that San Martín ordered the government to temporarily relocate to Soyapango and later Cojutepeque. Similarly, the Supreme Court of Justice and University of El Salvador temporarily relocated to San Vicente.

On 16 June, several Salvadoran leaders—including Pineda y Saldaña, Dueñas, Supreme Court president José Damián Villacorta, and Treasurer José María Cáceres, among others—proposed building the city of Nueva San Salvador (modern-day Santa Tecla) to replace San Salvador as the country's capital. The proposal was approved and Nueva San Salvador was founded on 8 August. The new city was established 8 miles (13 km) to the southwest of San Salvador at 800 feet (240 m) higher in elevation. President Rafael Campo led efforts to rebuild San Salvador from 1856 to 1858. In 1858, the decision to relocate the capital from Cojutepeque was a political struggle between opposing factions: Dueñas wanted to move the capital to Nueva San Salvador as planned, while San Martín and former president Eugenio Aguilar wanted to return the capital to San Salvador. The Catholic Church also urged the government to return to San Salvador due to the holy sites located in the city. Acting President Gerardo Barrios sided with San Martín and Aguilar and returned the country's capital to San Salvador. San Salvador officially resumed its status as El Salvador's capital on 28 June 1858.

According to author Percy Falcke Martin, San Salvador "[bore] not a single trace of the disaster" by 1911. San Salvador did not face another major earthquake that caused heavy damage until 1873. In 2024, La Prensa Gráfica ranked the 1854 San Salvador earthquake as the most devastating earthquake in Salvadoran history.

== See also ==
- List of earthquakes in El Salvador
