= 1852 Salvadoran presidential election =

- 26 January 1852
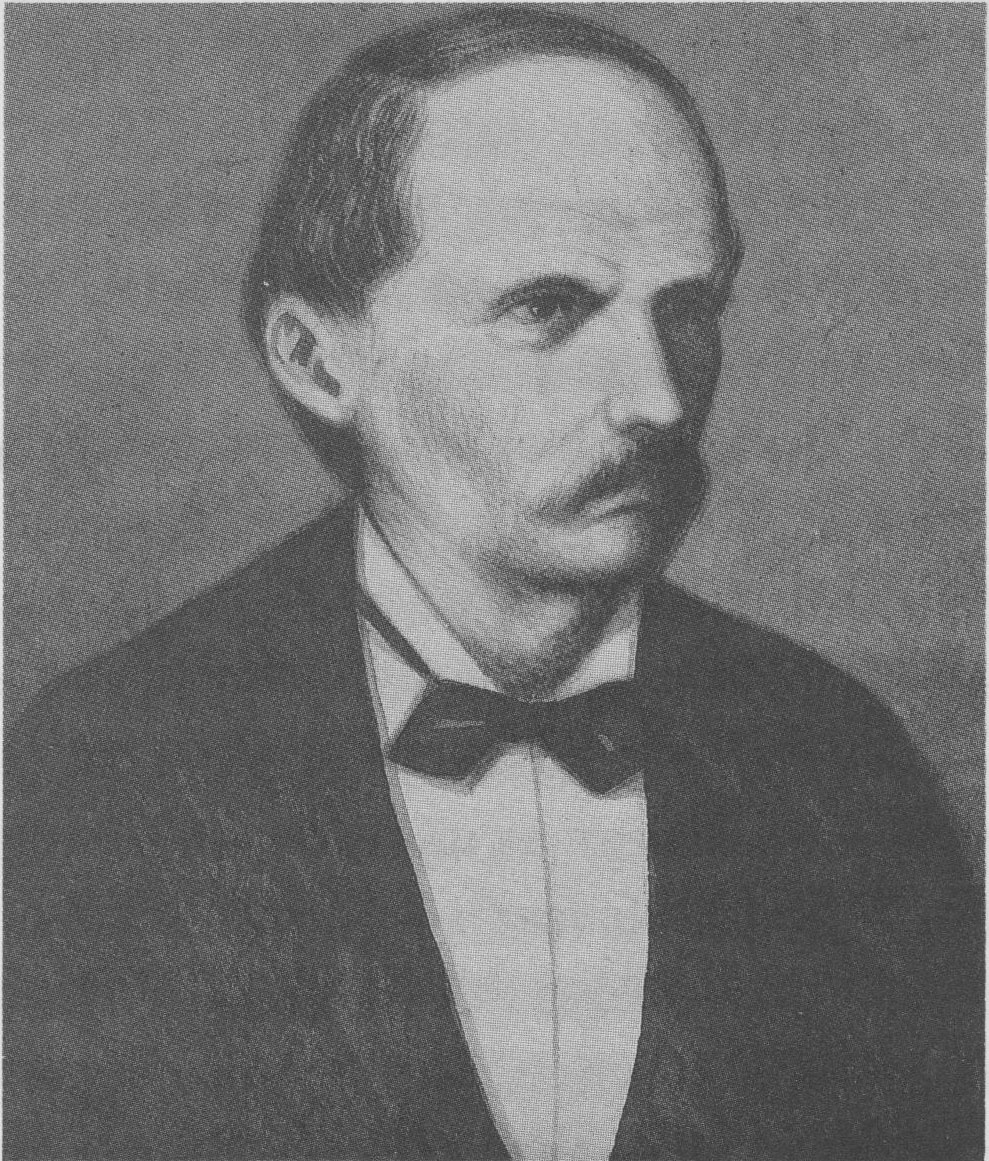
Candidate	Francisco Dueñas
Party	Conservative
Running mate	Tomás Medina
President before election
José María San Martín
Conservative
Elected President
Francisco Dueñas
Conservative

Presidential elections were held in El Salvador on 26 January 1852. Francisco Dueñas ran unopposed and was elected by the legislature. He claimed he was elected with the "unanimous vote of the citizenry". This was the first of four occasions during which Dueñas would serve as the Salvadoran president.

== Results ==
Candidate	Party
Francisco Dueñas	Conservative
Total
Source: Ching 1997, p. 180
