= Francisco Dueñas =

Salvadoran politician (1810–1884)

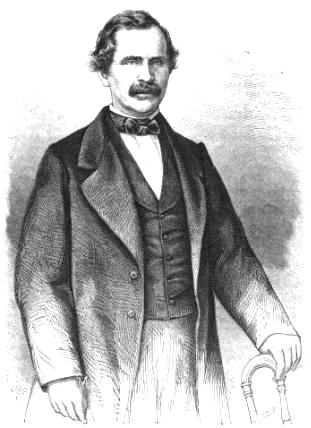
- Drawing of Dueñas, 1865

6th & 11th President of El Salvador
- In office 26 October 1863 – 15 April 1871; Provisional President until 1 February 1865
- Vice President: Vacant (1863–1865); Gregorio Arbizú (1865–1869); José María Parrilla (1869–1871)
- Preceded by: Gerardo Barrios
- Succeeded by: Santiago González
- In office 12 May 1856 – 19 July 1856; Acting President
- Vice President: Himself
- Preceded by: Rafael Campo
- Succeeded by: Rafael Campo
- In office 1 February 1856 – 12 February 1856; Acting President
- Vice President: Himself
- Preceded by: José María San Martín
- Succeeded by: Rafael Campo
- In office 1 February 1852 – 1 February 1854
- Vice President: Tomás Medina
- Preceded by: José María San Martín (acting)
- Succeeded by: Vicente Gómez (acting)
- In office 3 May 1851 – 30 January 1852; Acting President
- Vice President: José Félix Quirós
- Preceded by: José Félix Quirós (acting)
- Succeeded by: José María San Martín (acting)
- In office 12 January 1851 – 1 March 1851; Acting President
- Vice President: José Félix Quirós
- Preceded by: Doroteo Vasconcelos
- Succeeded by: José Félix Quirós (acting)
Other offices
15th Vice President of El Salvador
In office 1 February 1856 – 1 February 1858
| President | Rafael Campo |
| Preceded by | José Mariano Hernández |
| Succeeded by | Joaquín Eufrasio Guzmán |
13th President of the Senate of El Salvador
In office 27 January 1855 – 24 February 1855
| Preceded by | Juan José Bonilla |
| Succeeded by | José Mariano Hernández |
Minister of State of El Salvador
In office 4 February 1846 – 7 February 1848
| President | Eugenio Aguilar; Fermín Palacios (acting); Eugenio Aguilar; Tomás Medina (acting); José Félix Quirós (acting) |
Minister of Dispatches of El Salvador
In office February 1845 – 1 February 1846
| President | Joaquín Eufrasio Guzmán (acting); Fermín Palacios (acting); Joaquín Eufrasio Guzmán (acting) |
Member of the Senate of El Salvador
In office 1855–1856
In office 1849–1852

Personal details
- Born: Francisco Dueñas Díaz; 3 December 1810 San Salvador, New Spain
- Died: 4 March 1884 (aged 73) San Francisco, California, U.S.
- Resting place: Santa Tecla, El Salvador
- Party: Conservative
- Spouse: Teresa Dárdano (m. 1866)
- Children: 3
- Education: University of San Carlos
- Profession: Politician, lawyer

Francisco Dueñas Díaz (3 December 1810 – 4 March 1884) was a Salvadoran politician and lawyer who served as President of El Salvador on six different occasions between 1851 and 1871. He also served as Vice President of El Salvador from 1856 to 1858 and as President of the Senate in 1855.

Dueñas studied to become a Catholic priest but dropped out of the seminary and studied law at the University of San Carlos in Guatemala City. He was a member of the Central American Federal Congress and later as a magistrate of the Supreme Court of Justice of El Salvador. Dueñas served in several Salvadoran ministerial positions in the 1840s. He twice served as acting president in 1851. Dueñas was elected president in 1852 and served until 1854. He was vice president from 1856 to 1858 and served as acting president in 1856.

Dueñas was exiled to Guatemala during the presidency of General Gerardo Barrios. In 1863, Dueñas helped overthrow Barrios and became provisional president. He won the 1864 and 1869 presidential elections. He was overthrown in 1871 by Marshal Santiago González and exiled to the United States. He made several attempts to reenter El Salvador but fled each time. He died in San Francisco in 1884. Dueñas is one of only six Salvadoran presidents to have been re-elected.

== Early life ==
Francisco Dueñas Díaz was born on 3 December 1810 in San Salvador, New Spain. His father was José Miguel Dueñas and his mother was Secundina Díaz, who were wealthy. Dueñas' ancestors had accumulated their wealth through their agricultural work. Dueñas' parents enrolled him in San Salvador's only public school in his youth.

At the age of 17, Dueñas began attending the Santo Domingo Seminary in San Salvador and aspired to become a Catholic priest. He later transferred to the Order of Santo Domingo Seminary in Guatemala City. Dueñas dropped out of the seminary in 1829 when the Guatemalan government ordered the seminary to dismiss those attending it. After this, Dueñas sought to pursue a career in law. In 1836, Dueñas earned his doctorate at the University of San Carlos in Guatemala City.

== Political career ==
=== Early political career ===
In 1837, Dueñas returned to El Salvador and was elected as a member of the Federal Congress of the Federal Republic of Central America. The following year, he was elected as the secretary of the Federal Congress. In 1839, Salvadoran head of state Francisco Morazán appointed Dueñas as the vice secretary-general of dispatches. He served in this position until February 1840 when he resigned in protest of Morazán's invasion of Guatemala as a part of the Second Central American Civil War. In October 1841, Dueñas took part in the inauguration ceremony of the University of El Salvador.

Dueñas served as a magistrate of the Supreme Court of Justice of El Salvador from December 1842 to 1843. In 1843, Dueñas established the El Amigo del Pueblo ("The Friend of the People") newspaper in San Salvador, which was critical of General Francisco Malespín's presidency. Malespín accused Dueñas of conspiring to overthrow him and sought to expel him from the country, but the Supreme Court of Justice prevented Malespín from doing so. In February 1845, President Joaquín Eufrasio Guzmán appointed Dueñas as the country's minister of dispatches. He served in this position until February 1846. From February 1846 to February 1848, Dueñas served as the minister of state of El Salvador under President Eugenio Aguilar.

=== Early 1850s presidencies ===
In 1849, Dueñas was elected to the Senate of El Salvador. Dueñas attempted to run for president in the 1850 presidential election, but incumbent president Doroteo Vasconcelos did not allow Dueñas to do so as he was seeking re-election. Around this time, Dueñas and Juan Francisco Barrundia established the El Progresso ("The Progress") newspaper aimed at opposing Guatemalan president General Rafael Carrera. Dueñas was the rector of the University of El Salvador from 1850 to 1855.

On 12 January 1851, Dueñas became El Salvador's acting president as Vasconcelos led Salvadoran soldiers in an invasion of Guatemala. Dueñas received the presidency as he was the country's first presidential designate. Vasconcelos was defeated by Carrera at the Battle of La Arada in February 1851. After Vasconcelos' defeat, Carrera sought to maintain Dueñas as El Salvador's president as Carrera saw Dueñas as a potential ally. Dueñas ceded the acting presidency to Vice President José Félix Quirós on 1 March, but on 3 May, Quirós gave the acting presidency back to Dueñas.

In January 1852, Dueñas was elected as El Salvador's president unopposed. Dueñas remarked that he was elected with the "unanimous voice of the citizenry". Dueñas resigned as provisional president on 30 January 1852 and was briefly succeeded by Colonel José María San Martín for two days. Dueñas began his 1852–1854 presidential term on 1 February 1852; Tomás Medina was elected vice president. That month, a rebellion occurred in San Vicente seeking to restore Vasconcelos to the presidency, but it was suppressed by General Ramón Belloso. During Dueñas' term, he signed a peace treaty with Guatemala formally ending the war started by Vasconcelos. Dueñas' term ended on 1 February 1854 and he was briefly succeeded by Vicente Gómez as acting president before San Martín, the winner of the 1854 presidential election, assumed office a few days later. Like Dueñas, San Martín was an ally to Carrera.

On 27 January 1855, Dueñas was elected as the president of the Senate of El Salvador. He served until 24 February 1855. During the 1856 presidential election, Dueñas was elected as Rafael Campo's vice president. He assumed office on 1 February 1856. As vice president, he briefly served as acting president from 1 to 12 February 1856 before president-elect Campo could assume office. On 12 May 1856, Dueñas became acting president. In June, Dueñas sent 700 Salvadoran soldiers to fight against American filibusters in Nicaragua under the command of William Walker during the Filibuster War. Dueñas ceded presidential powers back to Campo on 19 July. Dueñas left the vice presidency on 1 February 1858 when his term expired.

=== Inter-presidencies ===
In 1859, Captain General Gerardo Barrios overthrew President Miguel Santín del Castillo. Dueñas fled El Salvador after Santín's overthrow as he saw Barrios as a liberal enemy. Dueñas briefly returned to El Salvador for two months in 1861 after Barrios granted him amnesty. Dueñas fled to Guatemala after Barrios accused him of plotting to overthrow his government. In exile, Salvadorans who opposed Barrios viewed Dueñas as the leader of the opposition.

=== Last presidency ===
In 1863, Dueñas and other exiled conservatives supported Carrera's invasion of El Salvador and sought to overthrow Barrios. Barrios was overthrown on 26 October 1863 and Dueñas was proclaimed as El Salvador's provisional president. Dueñas appointed a cabinet that consisted of Gregorio Arbizú as his minister of external relations; Juan José Bonilla as his minister of government; and Juan Delgado as his minister of finance and war. In March 1864, Dueñas proclaimed a new constitution. During the 1864 presidential election, Dueñas ran virtually unopposed, as only his allies ran alternative campaigns, and won virtually unanimously, as he won the vast majority of votes.

The "conservative flag" adopted by Dueñas' government in 1865

Dueñas was inaugurated on 1 February 1865. Arbizú was his vice president. Carrera died in April 1865. Barrios and his brother-in-law General Trinidad Cabañas sought to take advantage of Carrera's death and launched a rebellion eastern El Salvador, but the rebellion failed and Barrios was captured. A military tribunal sentenced Barrios to death on 28 August. Dueñas approved of the sentence, and Barrios was executed by firing squad early the next morning. On 28 April 1865, Dueñas approved a law that altered El Salvador's flag and coat of arms. The new flag, known as the "conservative flag" ("bandera conservadora"), bore resemblance to the flag of the United States. In 1867, Dueñas established the country's military college with assistance from the French military.

On 29 August 1865, the legislature amended article 33 of the constitution of El Salvador to allow Dueñas to run for re-election. He was successfully re-elected during the 1869 presidential election. Dueñas inaugurated the National Palace as the country's new capitol building on 19 January 1870.

Dueñas declared a state of emergency in December 1870 when a rebellion against his government was launched in Santa Ana; the rebellion was crushed. In March 1871, Honduras declared war on El Salvador and invaded the country. On 15 April 1871, liberal Marshal Santiago González overthrew Dueñas and seized the presidency. On 21 April, Dueñas sought asylum in the United States embassy in San Salvador, but he was eventually arrested and incarcerated at the military college.

== Personal life ==
Dueñas married Teresa Dárdano on 12 February 1866 in a ceremony presided over by Tomás Miguel Pineda y Saldaña, the bishop of San Salvador. Dueñas and Dárdano had three children: Francisco, Carlos, and Miguel. Dueñas also had two step children—Pablo and Antonia—through Dárdano's first marriage.

== Later life and death ==
=== Post-presidency ===
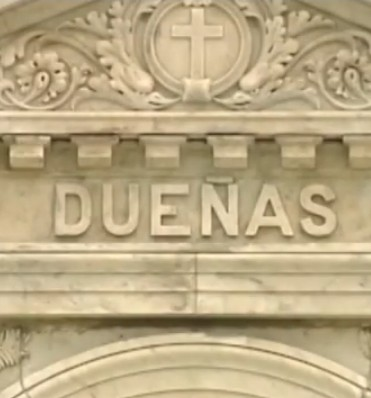
Dueñas' tomb in Santa Tecla

In 1872, the Salvadoran government expelled Dueñas and his family from El Salvador. They left the country for exile in the United States. In 1878, Dueñas attempted to re-enter El Salvador, but President Rafael Zaldívar accused him of attempting to overthrow his government and Dueñas fled back to the United States. The same sequence of events occurred in 1883.

=== Death ===
Dueñas died on 4 March 1884 in San Francisco, United States. His remains were returned to El Salvador in 1886 and he was buried in Nueva San Salvador (now Santa Tecla). Dueñas is one of only six Salvadoran presidents to have been successfully re-elected; the others are Vasconcelos, González, Zaldívar, Brigadier General Maximiliano Hernández Martínez, and Nayib Bukele. Dueñas was also the last conservative president of El Salvador until the 1920s, when the conservative Pío Romero Bosque became president in 1927.

Political offices
| Preceded by Doroteo Vasconcelos | President of El Salvador (acting); 1851 | Succeeded by José Félix Quirós (acting) |
| Preceded by José Félix Quirós (acting) | President of El Salvador (acting); 1851–1852 | Succeeded by José María San Martín (acting) |
| Preceded by José María San Martín (acting) | President of El Salvador; 1852–1854 | Succeeded by Vicente Gómez (acting) |
| Preceded by Juan José Bonilla | President of the Senate of El Salvador; 1855 | Succeeded by José Mariano Hernández |
| Preceded by José María San Martín | President of El Salvador (acting); 1856 | Succeeded by Rafael Campo |
| Preceded by José Mariano Hernández | Vice President of El Salvador; 1856–1858 | Succeeded by Joaquín Eufrasio Guzmán |
| Preceded by Rafael Campo | President of El Salvador (acting); 1856 | Succeeded by Rafael Campo |
| Preceded by Gerardo Barrios | President of El Salvador (provisional until 1865); 1863–1871 | Succeeded by Santiago González |
