= José Peralta =

José Peralta may refer to:

- Jose Peralta (1971–2018), member of the New York State Senate
- José María Peralta (1807–1883), President of El Salvador in 1859
