= Gerardo Barrios =

10th President of El Salvador (1813–1865)

Captain General Gerardo Barrios
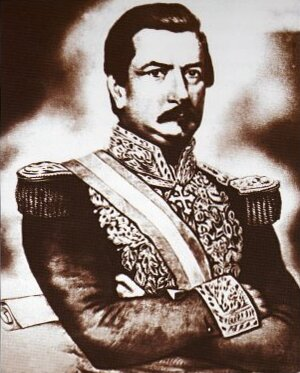
- Portrait of Gerardo Barrios, 1861

10th President of El Salvador
- In office 7 February 1861 – 26 October 1863
- Vice President: José Félix Quirós
- Preceded by: Miguel Santín del Castillo
- Succeeded by: Francisco Dueñas
- In office 12 March 1859 – 16 December 1860; Acting President until 1 February 1860
- Preceded by: Miguel Santín del Castillo
- Succeeded by: José María Peralta (acting)
- In office 24 June 1858 – 18 September 1858; Acting President
- Preceded by: Miguel Santín del Castillo
- Succeeded by: Miguel Santín del Castillo

Personal details
- Born: José Gerardo Barrios Espinoza; 24 September 1813 Cacahuatique, Intendancy of San Salvador
- Died: 29 August 1865 (aged 51) San Salvador, El Salvador
- Cause of death: Execution by firing squad
- Resting place: Cemetery of Distinguished Citizens
- Party: Liberal
- Spouse: Adelaida Guzmán Saldós (m. 1843)
- Relatives: Joaquín Eufrasio Guzmán (father-in-law)
- Occupation: Military officer, politician

Military service
- Rank: Captain general
- Battles/wars: Filibuster War; War of 1863; Battle of Coatepeque; Siege of San Salvador

José Gerardo Barrios Espinoza (24 September 1813 – 29 August 1865) was a Salvadoran statesman and military officer who served as the 10th President of El Salvador from 1859 to 1863. A central figure in Central American Liberalism, he is revered as a national hero for his efforts to modernize Salvadoran society, secularize the state, and promote the coffee industry.

Born in 1813, Barrios was taught various fields of education by his grandfather and a family friend, who also instilled in him his liberal ideals he held throughout his life. As a teenager, Barrios fought for the Federal Republic of Central America under Francisco Morazán from the late-1820s to the early-1840s. He continued his military career in El Salvador where he fought during Malespín's War in the mid-1840s, the Guatemalan–Salvadoran War in the early-1850s, and the Filibuster War in the mid-1850s.

As minister of internal affairs in 1857, Barrios attempted a coup d'état against President Rafael Campo but failed. Despite his attempted coup, he was appointed as minister of external affairs in January 1858 by President Miguel Santín del Castillo. When Santín left the presidency due to illness on 24 June 1858, Barrios assumed office as provisional president. Santín resumed his presidency on 17 September 1858 and appointed Barrios as minister of internal and external affairs three days later.

In January 1859, Santín and Barrios both resigned from their positions and Joaquín Eufrasio Guzmán, Barrios' father-in-law, became president. Eventually, Guzmán resigned and was replaced by José María Peralta on 15 February 1859, who himself resigned on 12 March 1859 and was replaced by Barrios. Barrios ran unopposed and won the 1859 presidential election, and began a six-yer term on 1 February 1860. During his presidency, Barrios worked to improve the country's education system and reduce the influence of the Catholic Church.

In 1863, conservatives joined a Guatemalan invasion of El Salvador to depose Barrios. Although Barrios defeated Guatemalan soldiers under Rafael Carrera at the Battle of Coatepeque in February 1863, the Guatemalans eventually prevailed and forced Barrios to flee the country on 26 October 1863 after the Siege of San Salvador. In his place, the Guatemalans installed Francisco Dueñas as provisional president. Barrios attempted to return to power in May 1865, but his ship was forced to dock in Nicaragua where he was arrested. He was extradited to El Salvador in August 1865 where he was court-martialed and sentenced to death. Barrios was executed by a firing squad on 29 August 1865.

Barrios is considered to be a national hero and has many locations and institutions named after him.

== Early life ==
José Gerardo Barrios Espinoza was born to José María Barrios and Petrona Espinoza de Barrios; his paternal grandparents were Pedro Joaquín Barrios and Margarita Cisneros Avila, both of Spanish descent. His place and date of birth is disputed; he was born in either Cacahuatique (modern-day Ciudad Barrios) or La Poza de la Juana (today a part of Nuevo Edén de San Juan), and he was born on either 24 September 1813 or 3 October 1813. He was baptized on 24 October 1813. Barrios had three sisters: Petronila, María Josefa, and Onicéfora.

Barrios suffered from some sort of defect and limped throughout his life. He was described as being sincere and loyal with his friends and being discreet when speaking. During his youth, Barrios was taught the Spanish language, geography, American and European history, mathematics, astronomy, and physics by Pedro Joaquin Barrios (his paternal grandfather) and a family friend. They instilled in him his liberal ideals which he held throughout his life. Barrios was religious.

Barrios married Adelaida Guzmán Saldós in 1843. Guzmán Saldós, who was 17 years old at the time of her marriage, was the daughter of Joaquín Eufrasio Guzmán, the president of El Salvador from 1845–1846 and in 1859, and Paula Saldós. Their marriage produced no children.

== Early career ==
As a liberal, Barrios was a proponent of Central American reunification. Barrios fought for Francisco Morazán, the president of the Federal Republic of Central America, during the First and Second Central American Civil Wars beginning in 1828 when he was only a teenager. Barrios also served as a member of the Federal Congress of the federal republic from 1836 to 1838. Barrios was a coquimbo, a liberal who fought until the very end of the second civil war and fled on the ship of the same name after Morazán was executed in 1842.

In 1844 and 1845, Barrios participated in the overthrow of President Francisco Malespín. During the 1840s and 1850s, Barrios visited Europe and developed estates in eastern El Salvador. On 24 January 1850, the Salvadoran legislature granted Barrios the rank of captain general. On 2 February 1851, Barrios fought under President Doroteo Vasconcelos during the Battle of La Arada, which ended in a Salvadoran defeat against Guatemalan forces under President Rafael Carrera. Barrios was called to participate in the Filibuster War against William Walker's Nicaraguan government where he commanded a division.

In October 1856, Barrios, along with General José Trinidad Cabañas (his brother-in-law through Cabañas' marriage to Barrios' sister Petronila) and José María Zelaya, began conspiring a coup d'état against President Rafael Campo. In January 1857, Campo appointed Barrios as El Salvador's minister of interior relations and was named as a designated successor to the presidency the following month. On 7 June 1857, Barrios began a coup d'état against Campo, moving 1,500 soldiers of the first division to the port city of La Libertad, and the following day, moved the division to San Salvador. Campo declared Barrios to be a traitor and ordered General Ramón Belloso to attack Barrios' soldiers on 12 June 1857. Barrios surrendered to Campo on 14 June 1857.

== Presidency ==
=== Assuming office ===
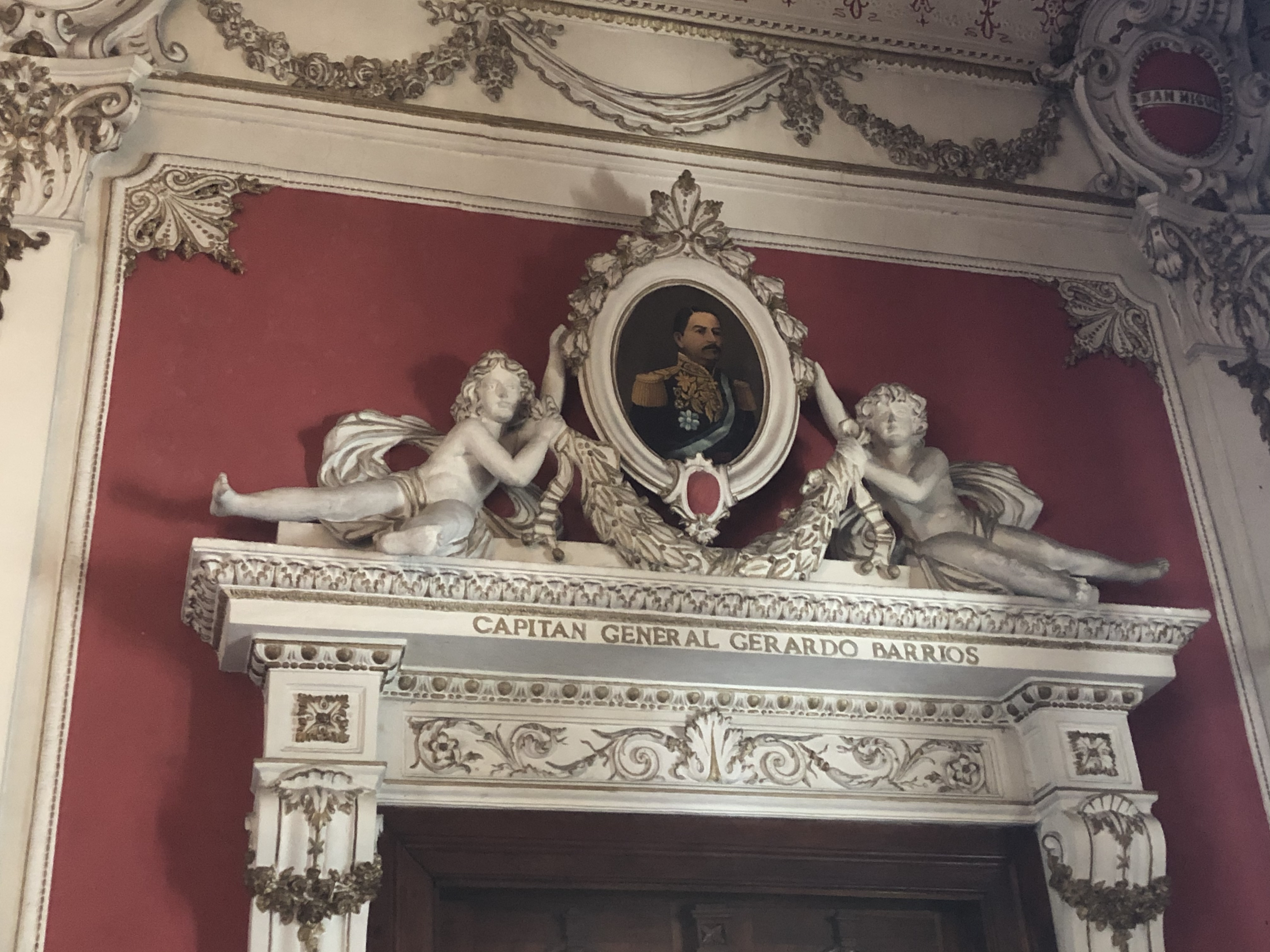
Barrios' portrait in the National Palace.

On 7 February 1858, Miguel Santín del Castillo became president of El Salvador. He appointed Guzmán, Barrios' father-in-law, as his vice president. He named Lorenzo Zepeda as the first designated successor to the presidency, and Barrios as the second designated successor. Additionally, Barrios was appointed as minister of external relations on 31 March 1858.

On 24 June 1858, Barrios assumed the presidency in an acting capacity when Santín temporarily left politics due to illness. On 14 September 1858, Barrios ordered Morazán's body to be exhumed from its resting place in Cojutepeque to be moved to San Salvador, where it was buried following a religious ceremony on 17 September 1858. He left office the following day. On 20 September 1858, Santín appointed Barrios as minister of interior and exterior relations and as general commander of the state.

Santín ordered Barrios to resign from his positions, to which Barrios responded he would only do so if Santín also resigned. On 19 January 1859, Santín and Barrios both resigned, and the Legislative Assembly met to choose a new president. Barrios supported Guzmán's bid for the presidency, while Santín attempted to regain his position. Ultimately, the Legislative Assembly chose Guzmán as president, and Santín and several of his supporters left the country. A few weeks into Guzmán's presidency, he retired from politics and was replaced by José María Peralta on 15 February 1859. Peralta named Barrios as the country's military commander the day he assumed the presidency. Barrios returned to the presidency, again in an acting capacity, on 12 March 1859 after Peralta resigned.

On 4 December 1859, Barrios won the 1859 presidential election unopposed and assumed the presidency in an official capacity on 1 February 1860, appointing José Félix Quirós as his vice president. Barrios left office on 16 December 1860 so that he could make a state visit to Guatemala and was replaced by Peralta as acting president. He returned to El Salvador and resumed his presidency on 7 February 1861. During his presidency, Barrios' government drafted a new constitution which allowed him to run for re-election.

=== Education policies ===
In 1859, Barrios rebuilt the Asunción College and reorganized its structure to be more secular and established three new universities: the Normal Schools of San Miguel, San Salvador, Santa Ana.

In 1860, Barrios informed the Legislative Assembly that he intended to "regenerate" the country. He described El Salvador as "backward", "destitute", and "misgoverned" upon assuming office. Barrios sought to achieve five primary goals during his presidency: promote agriculture, industry, and commerce; introduce progressive Western European ideals to the country; encourage immigration to the country; reform the country's education system; construct new roads and ports to expand the country's international trade and internal transportation.

=== Coffee industry ===
Barrios believed that El Salvador would be a major coffee producer by 1864, encouraging the transfer of government-owned haciendas to coffee planters. Barrios' government allowed oligarchs who held a stake in coffee production to hold significant power and influence in El Salvador, power and influence which would persist until the overthrow of President Arturo Araujo by the military in December 1931.

=== Relationship with the Church ===
On 11 October 1861, Barrios issued a decree which ordered all priests in the country to swear loyalty and submission to the constitution and the government. Many priests, including Tomás Miguel Pineda y Saldaña, the archbishop of San Salvador, left the country in protest on 19 November 1861. In April 1862, the Salvadoran government signed a concordat with the Holy See, outlining the relation between both parties.

=== War with Guatemala and overthrow ===
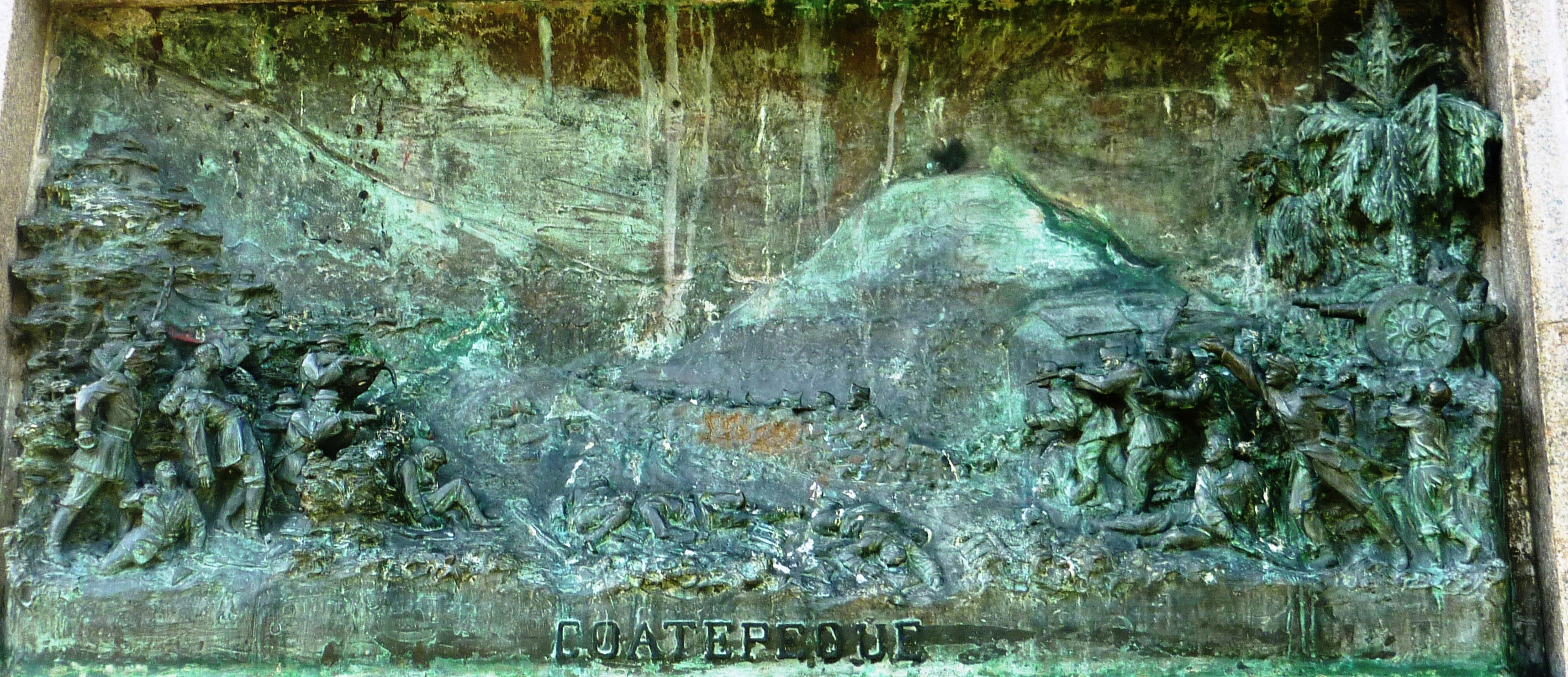
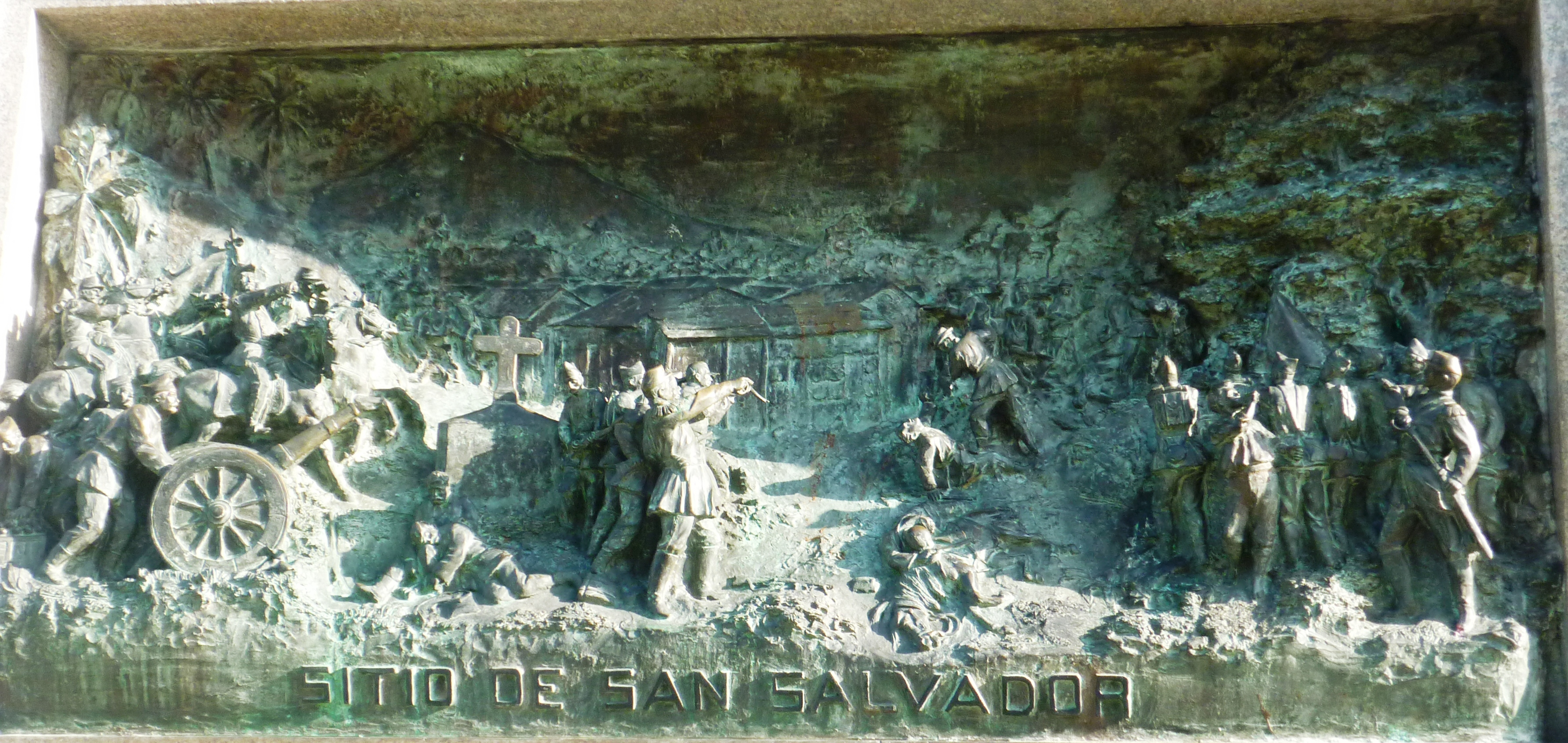
Depictions of the Battle of Coatepeque (top) and the Siege of San Salvador (bottom) in the Plaza Gerardo Barrios.

Barrios' rise to the presidency in El Salvador was initially supported by Carrera, who was still serving as president of Guatemala, as he believed that Barrios' strong government would ensure stability in the region in the wake of the war against Walker's Nicaragua. To support Barrios, Carrera did not allow Salvadoran exiles in Guatemala to organize themselves to challenge Barrios. In December 1860 and January 1861, Barrios made an official visit to Guatemala. Eventually, however, relations between both countries deteriorated.

On 11 January 1862, Honduran President José Santos Guardiola was assassinated and Barrios sought to influence the succeeding liberal government. Barrios' influence in Honduras was opposed by the Guatemalan government, and both Barrios and Carrera issued personal insults against each other; Barrios referred to Carrera as "the savage" and Guatemalan writers mocked Barrios as lame and pompous.

In 1863, El Salvador and Guatemala went to war. In February 1863, Salvadoran forces led by Barrios defeated the Guatemalans at the Battle of Coatepeque. On 30 June 1863, Marshal Santiago González defected to the Guatemalans and declared himself as provisional president in opposition of Barrios. On 26 October 1863, after a long siege, Carrera captured San Salvador, deposing Barrios from power and forcing him to flee the country.

The day Barrios was overthrown, Francisco Dueñas, a conservative exile, succeeded Barrios as the country's provisional president; on 4 December 1864, Dueñas won the 1864 presidential election unopposed and assumed the presidency in an official capacity on 1 February 1865.

== Exile, arrest, and execution ==
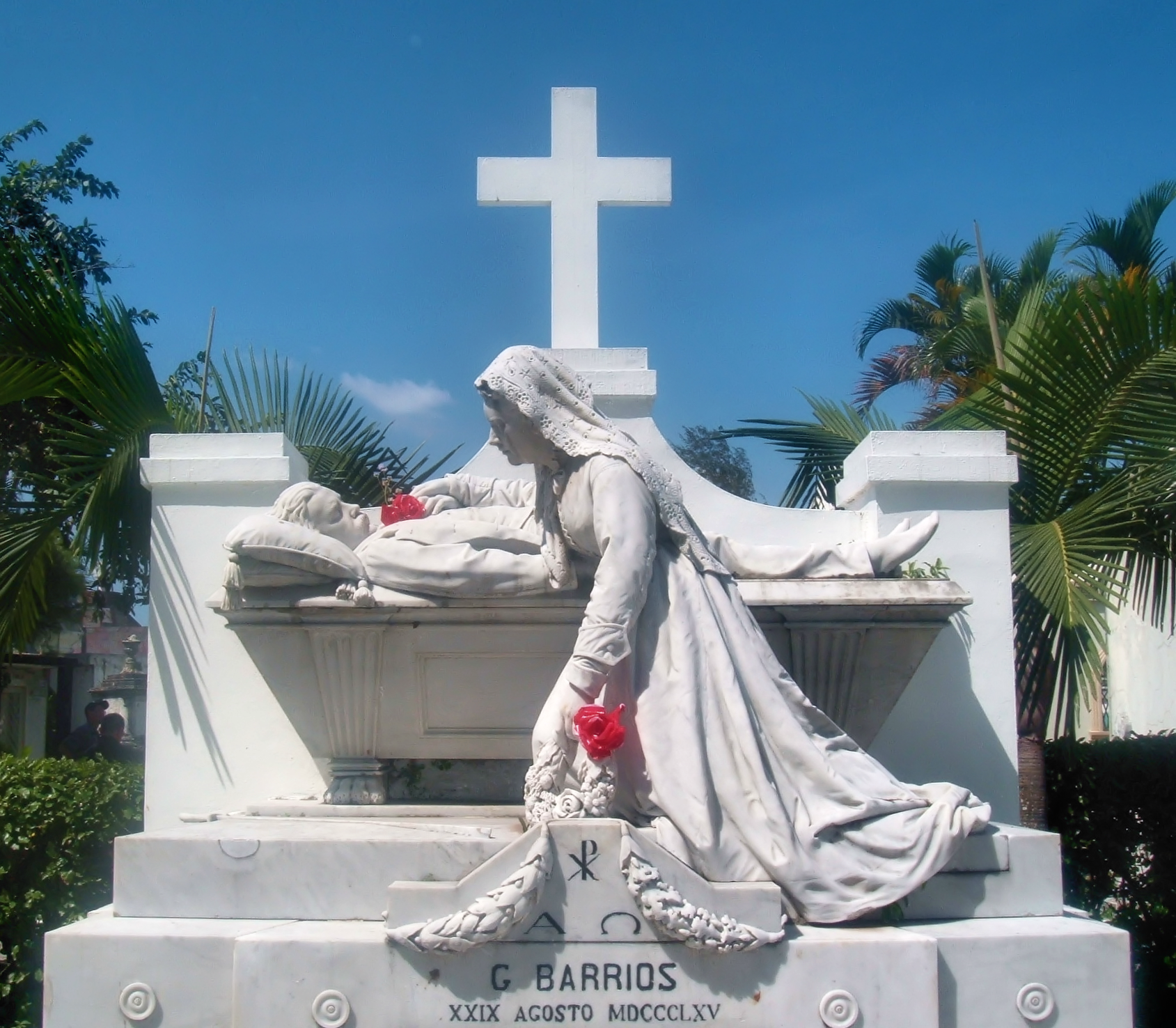
Barrios' grave in the Cemetery of Distinguished Citizens.

After his overthrow, Barrios and his wife fled to country to Panama, and then later, New York City and Washington, D.C. In 1864, Barrios published a manifesto which rejected the Salvadoran government's legitimacy—calling its leaders usurpers—and rejected the government's declaration that found Barrios guilty of high treason and declared him a traitor.

In 1865, Dueñas broke up the department of San Miguel into three smaller departments—La Unión, San Miguel, and Usulután—to reduce its size and influence, and Barrios retained high support there. On 15 May 1865, Cabañas attempted a rebellion in San Miguel to restore Barrios as president, and the government declared a state of siege. In June 1865, Barrios returned to El Salvador with 800 rifles on the ship Manuela Planas sailing under the American flag with hopes of seizing the presidency by force, however, his ship was damaged by a lightning strike and was forced to divert for El Realejo, Nicaragua. He and his ship were seized by the Nicaraguan government after his documentation papers were deemed to be forgeries. Diplomats from El Salvador to Nicaragua to demand his extradition, and as the Nicaraguan and Salvadoran governments were friendly to one another and the diplomats assured that Barrios would not be executed, he was extradited to El Salvador.

Barrios was imprisoned and court-martialed by the Salvadoran government; his trial began on 10 August 1865. He was sentenced to death on 28 August 1865 at 11 p.m.; Barrios was denied the right to "settle his private affairs" and was executed by a firing squad five hours later on 29 August 1865. The New York Times described his execution as a "barbarous act" and the Nicaraguan government criticized Barrios' execution as being in bad faith. The government lifted the state of siege on 31 August 1865.

== Legacy ==
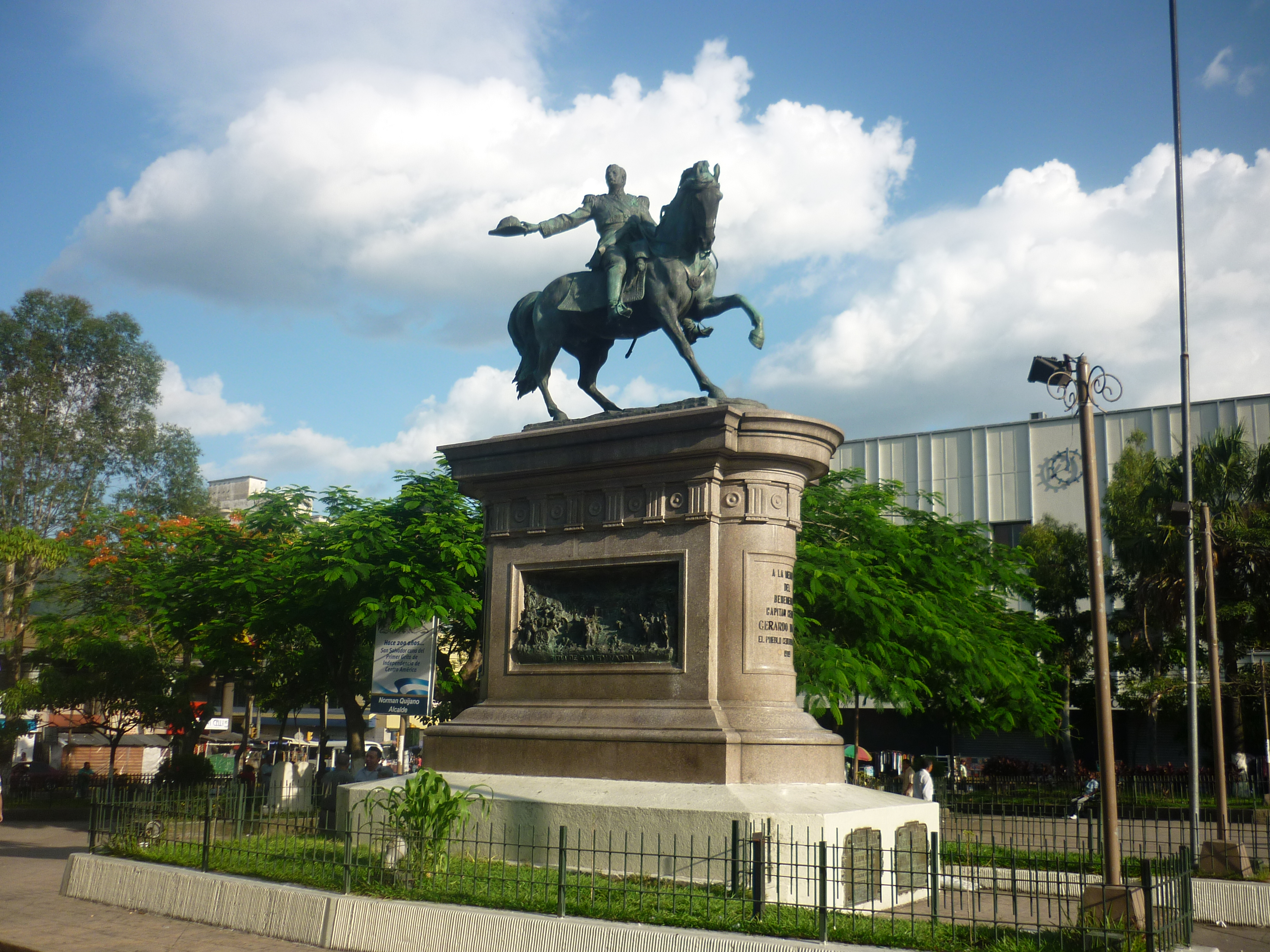
An equestrian statue of Barrios in the Plaza Gerardo Barrios.

In 1882, when a monument to Morazán was inaugurated, Barrios was given a tribute due to their shared ideology of Central American unification. In 1910, Barrios was declared by the Salvadoran government to be a national hero.

Various locations and institutions in El Salvador are named after Barrios. On 29 August 1909, the Bolívar Plaza, San Salvador's central plaza which includes the San Salvador Cathedral and the National Palace, was renamed to the Plaza Gerardo Barrios. An equestrian status of Barrios was installed in that plaza in 1910. In 1911, President Manuel Enrique Araujo established the Cooperative Society "Gerardo Barrios 29 of August". On 28 January 1927, President Pío Romero Bosque issued an executive order to rename the country's military school, established in 1868, to the Captain General Gerardo Barrios Military School (EMCGGB). The military school retained its name until it was closed and demolished in June 2022 to make way for the construction of the National Stadium of El Salvador. In 1981, the Captain General Gerardo Barrios University (UGB) was established in San Miguel.

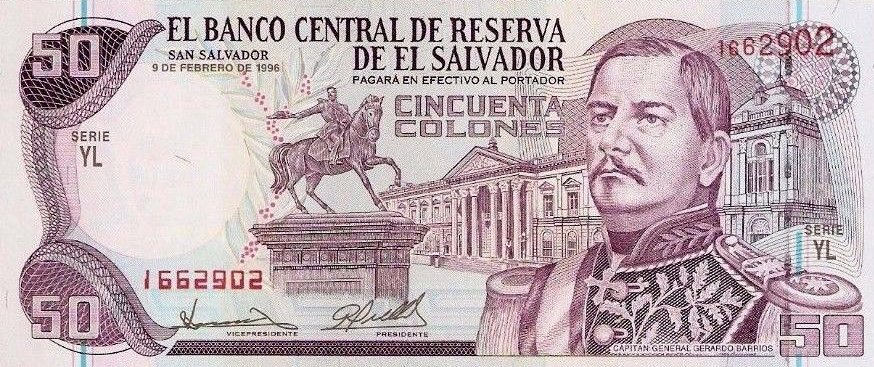
A SVC₡50 banknote featuring Barrios.

Barrios was featured on the SVC₡50 banknote. A military march, named "Marcha Gerardo Barrios", has been composed. Barrios is buried in the Cemetery of Distinguished Citizens.

== Electoral history ==
Year	Office	Type	Party	Main opponent	Party	Votes for Barrios				Result	Swing
Year	Office	Type	Party	Main opponent	Party	Total	%	P.	±%	Result	Swing
1859	President of El Salvador	General	Liberal	Unopposed		?	100.0	1st	N/A	Won	Hold

== Awards and decorations ==
Guatemala

- Order of Honor (1858)

Italy

- Order of Saints Maurice and Lazarus

Papal States

- Order of St. Gregory the Great

== See also ==
- President of El Salvador

Political offices
Preceded by Miguel Santín del Castillo	President of El Salvador (Acting President); 1858	Succeeded by Miguel Santín del Castillo
Preceded by José María Peralta (Acting President)	President of El Salvador; 1859–1860	Succeeded by José María Peralta (Acting President)
Preceded by José María Peralta (Acting President)	President of El Salvador; 1861–1863	Succeeded by Francisco Dueñas (Provisional President)
