= 1856 Salvadoran presidential election =

- 30 January 1856
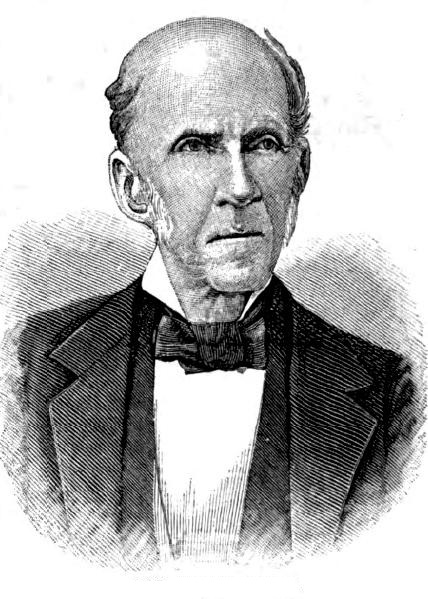
Candidate	Rafael Campo
Party	Conservative
Running mate	Francisco Dueñas
President before election
José María San Martín
Independent
Elected President
Rafael Campo
Conservative

Presidential elections were held in El Salvador on 30 January 1856. Rafael Campo ran unopposed and was elected by the citizenry, the first popular election in Salvadoran history.

== Results ==
Candidate	Party
Rafael Campo	Conservative (Republican Party)
Total
Source: University of California, San Diego
