= National Palace =

Buildings called National Palace include:

- National Palace (Dominican Republic), in Santo Domingo
- National Palace (El Salvador), in San Salvador
- National Palace (Ethiopia), in Addis Ababa; also known as the Jubilee Palace
- National Palace (Guatemala), in Guatemala City
- National Palace (Haiti), in Port-au-Prince
- National Palace (Nicaragua), in Managua
- National Palace (Mexico), in Mexico City
- National Palace Museum in Taipei, Taiwan (Republic of China)
- Palau Nacional (en: National Palace), in Barcelona, Spain
- National Youth and Children's Palace (Sometimes referred as National Palace), in Tbilisi

In Portugal:

- Ajuda National Palace, in Lisbon
- Mafra National Palace, in Mafra
- Pena National Palace, in Sintra
- Sintra National Palace, in Sintra
- Queluz National Palace, in Queluz
