= Plaza Gerardo Barrios =

Plaza and cultural heritage site in San Salvador, El Salvador

Coordinates: 13.6976°N 89.1911°W

- Plaza Cívica
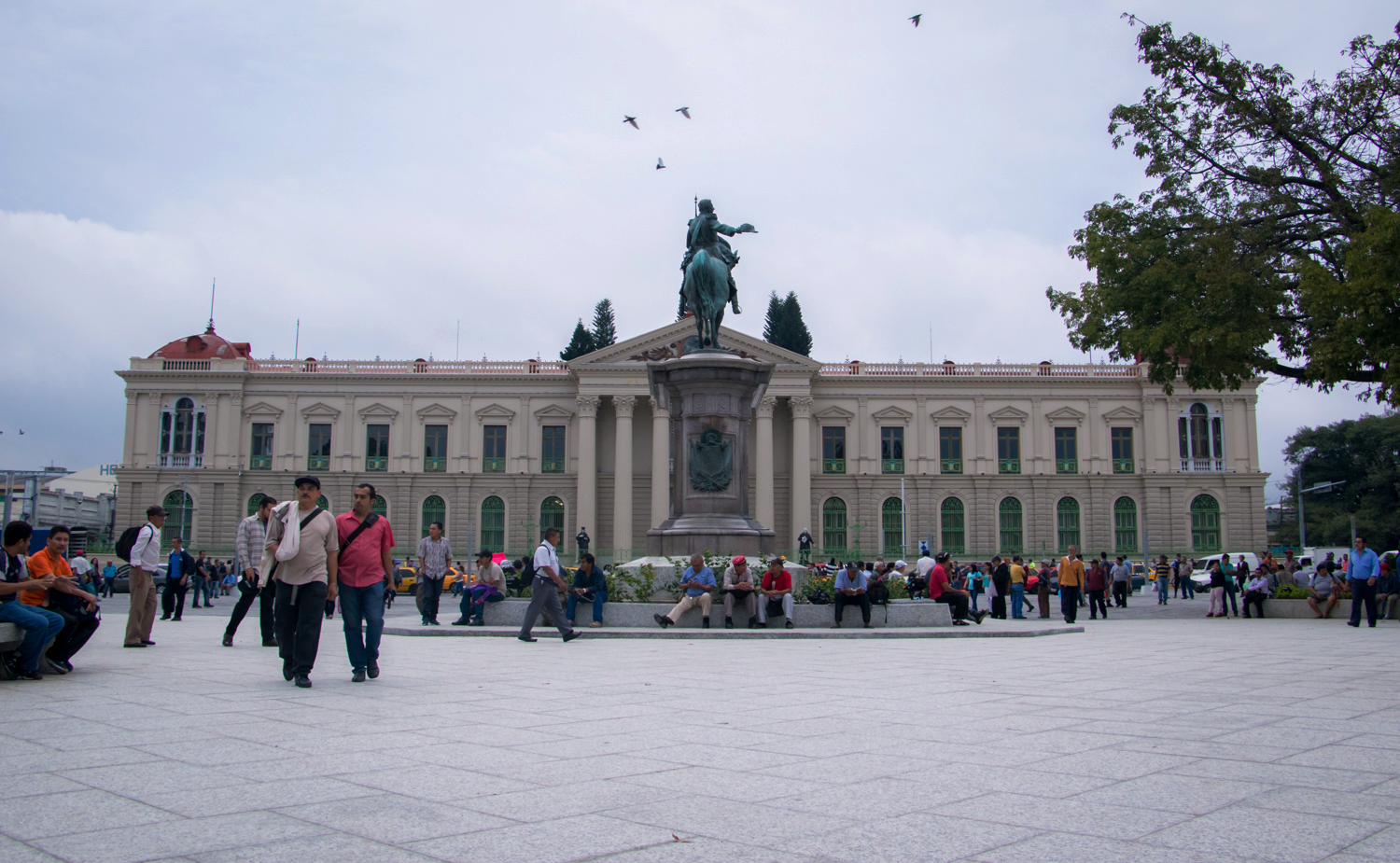
- Interactive map of Plaza Gerardo Barrios
- Location: San Salvador, El Salvador

The Plaza Gerardo Barrios is a plaza in the historic center of the city of San Salvador, El Salvador.

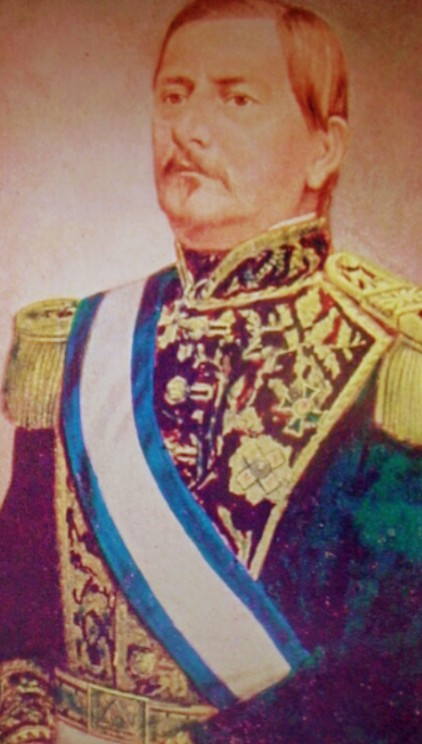
Gerardo Barrios.

The monumental statue in the center of the plaza, dedicated to president Gerardo Barrios, was made by Francisco Durini and inaugurated in 1909. The project for the monument was conceived by brothers Antonio and Carlos Ezeta, with participation of educator Rafael Reyes. The statue, cast in bronze, shows an equestrian statue of the military leader. The statue is placed on a pedestal of granite that shows battle scenes cast in bronze and the coat of arms of El Salvador.

The plaza is an important point of reference for the Salvadoran capital because it is surrounded by emblematic structures such as the National Palace and the Metropolitan Cathedral.

It has also been the scene of various historic moments, such as:

- The assassination attempt against president Manuel Araujo (1865–1913), on 4 February 1913, when four men attacked him with machetes. The president died five days later.
- The disturbances on 30 March 1980 during the funeral of archbishop Óscar Romero, assassinated 6 days earlier during a mass.
- The celebration of the end of the Civil War, on 2 February 1992.
- The presidential inauguration of the 2019 presidential election, leaving Nayib Bukele as president of the republic for the period of 2019–2024.

In 1999, the plaza was remodeled during the administration of mayor Héctor Silva, and once more in 2012 during Norman Quijano's administrations, during which a fountain and a ceramic floor was added.

Currently, the plaza is the site of distinct activities of public and religious interest; it is the principal site for the celebration of the patron saint San Salvador during August, since it is where the procession dedicated to the Divine Savior of the World ends, typically called "la bajada". It is also the site of parades.

== Historical antecedents ==
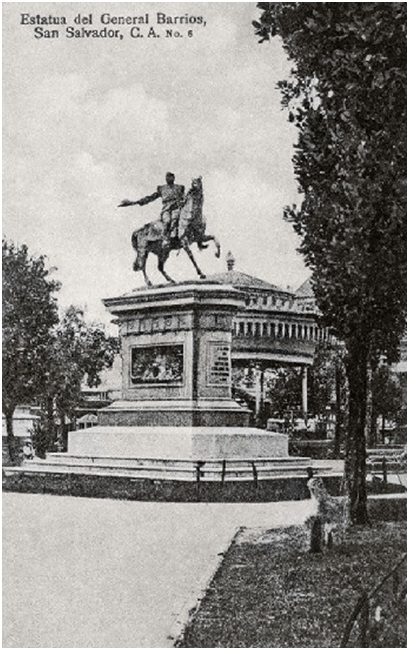
Statue of Capitán General Gerardo Barrios – San Salvador, 1915

In 1566 the convent of Santo Domingo was moved to the site that is now occupied by the Metropolitan Cathedral, the empty lot in front of the convent came to be known as the "Plaza de Santo Domingo".

En el ejemplar de El Constitucional del 25 de octubre de 1866 se publicó que el presidente había tocado la necesidad de un parque en la capital y que sería una de sus obras inmediatas.

By December 1867, it was reported that foreign imported lamps were to be placed in the Plaza de Santo Domingo and that the same plaza would be the first to receive trees in its perimeter as well as benches; it was also projected that a poplar park was to be constructed after the conclusion of the facade of the first National Palace. By this year as well, the plaza began to be known as the "Plaza Central" or "Plaza Principal" after the remodelling efforts by the Spanish general Luis Pérez Gómez.

By mid-January 1868, the official government journal, El Constitucional, reported that the plaza was to be known as the Plaza de Armas and implored that beautification works would begin. By the end of the month, the atrium of the Iglesia de Santo Domingo was being surrounded by iron guardrails, a work administered by presbyters don Felipe Novales and don Ysac Paz. In 1875 a kiosk was erected.

In 1884 the plaza was paved, by this time the plaza was known as "Plaza Bolívar"; seven years later, the plaza was lit by electric light bulbs for the first time.

== See also ==
- Plaza Libertad
