= José Mariano Hernández =

Acting president of El Salvador in 1854

General José Mariano Hernández

Acting President of El Salvador
- In office 26 September 1854 – 13 November 1854
- Vice President: Himself
- Preceded by: José María San Martín
- Succeeded by: José María San Martín

Vice President of El Salvador
- In office 14 February 1854 – 1 February 1856
- President: José María San Martín; Himself
- Preceded by: Tomás Medina
- Succeeded by: Francisco Dueñas

President of the Senate of El Salvador
- In office 21 January 1856 – 14 April 1856
- Preceded by: Francisco Dueñas
- Succeeded by: Ignacio Gómez

Personal details
- Born: José Mariano Hernández Martínez; 28 July 1786 Suchitoto, New Spain
- Died: 21 October 1864 (aged 78) Suchitoto, El Salvador
- Party: Conservative
- Spouse: Vicenta González
- Occupation: Politician, military officer

Military service
- Allegiance: El Salvador
- Branch/service: Salvadoran Army
- Rank: General

José Mariano Hernández Martínez (28 July 1786 – 21 October 1864) was a Salvadoran politician and military officer who served as acting president of El Salvador in 1854 and as vice president of El Salvador from 1854 to 1856.

== Biography ==
José Mariano Hernández Martínez was born on 28 July 1786 in Suchitoto, San Salvador, then a part of New Spain. His parents were Andrés Antonio Hernández and Juana María Martínez. From 1822 to 1823, Hernández was a Salvadoran soldier and fought against Mexican forces during its conquest of El Salvador.

In 1852 and 1854, Hernández served as a deputy of the Senate of El Salvador. On 14 February 1854, Hernández became vice president of El Salvador under President José María San Martín. From 26 September 1854 to 13 November 1854, he served as acting president. He resigned from the vice presidency on 13 November 1855. In 1856, he became a deputy of the Senate and served as its president from 21 January 1856 to 14 April 1856. He returned to the Senate in 1857 and 1859, and served as the governor of the Chalatenango and Cuscatlán Departments during the latter Senate term. On 24 April 1859, Hernández was assaulted and seriously injured by Tubircio Santa Cruz in an attack on his home. Santa Cruz was subsequently executed by firing squad on 9 May 1859.

During the War of 1863, Hernández came out of military retirement and commanded forces for President Gerardo Barrios at the Battle of Coatepeque. After the battle, Barrios ordered Hernández's arrest and he fled to Guatemala to support Francisco Dueñas' invading army. He recognized Dueñas as El Salvador's president.

Hernández married Vicenta González. He died in Suchitoto on 21 October 1864. He was buried at the Parroquial church.

Political offices
Preceded by Tomás Medina	Vice President of El Salvador; 1854–1856	Succeeded by Francisco Dueñas
Preceded by José María San Martín	President of El Salvador (acting); 1854	Succeeded by José María San Martín
Preceded by Francisco Dueñas	President of the Senate of El Salvador; 1856	Succeeded by Ignacio Gómez
