= Vicente Gómez =

Vicente Gómez may refer to:

- Juan Vicente Gómez, military ruler of Venezuela between 1908–1935
- Vicente Gómez (politician), president of El Salvador
- Vicente Gómez (composer), Spanish guitarist and composer
- Vicente Gómez (footballer, born 1971), Spanish football defender and manager
- Vicente Gómez (footballer, born 1988), Spanish football midfielder
