= 1854 Salvadoran presidential election =

- 11 February 1854
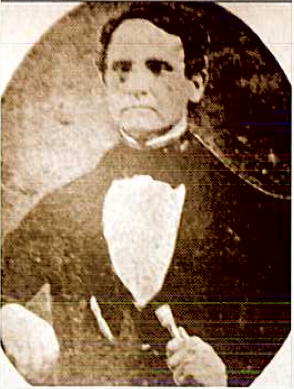
Candidate	José María San Martín
Party	Conservative
Running mate	Mariano Hernández
President before election
Vicente Gómez (acting)
Independent
Elected President
José María San Martín
Conservative

Presidential elections were held in El Salvador on 11 February 1854. José María San Martín ran unopposed and was elected by the legislature. He had previously served as provisional president of the country from 30 January to 1 February 1852.

== Results ==
Candidate	Party
José María San Martín	Conservative
Total
Source: University of California, San Diego
