= Tomás Medina =

President of El Salvador (1803–1884)

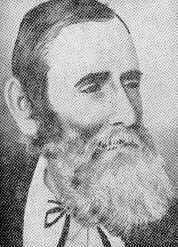

President of El Salvador
- In office 1 February 1848 – 3 February 1848; Acting President
- Preceded by: Eugenio Aguilar
- Succeeded by: José Félix Quirós (acting)

Vice President of El Salvador
- In office 1 February 1852 – 1 February 1854
- President: Francisco Dueñas
- Preceded by: José Félix Quirós
- Succeeded by: José Mariano Hernández

Personal details
- Born: José Tomás Medina Menéndez; June 1803 Santa Ana, New Spain
- Died: 13 February 1884 (aged 80) El Salvador
- Resting place: Cemetery of Distinguished Citizens, San Salvador, El Salvador
- Party: Independent
- Spouse: Gertrudis Rodríguez (m. 1831)
- Occupation: Politician

José Tomás Medina Menéndez (June 1803 – 13 February 1884) was a Salvadoran politician who served as vice president of El Salvador from 1852 to 1854 and as acting president of El Salvador from 1 to 3 February 1848. He also served as a deputy, a senator, and as the governor of the Sonsonate Department.

== Early life ==
José Tomás Medina Menéndez was born in Santa Ana, New Spain in June 1803. His parents were José Bernardo Medina and Juana Medina, both Spaniards. Medina married Gertrudis Rodríguez on 9 March 1831.

In 1833, Medina purchased the Apanteos windmill, and in 1836, he purchased the San Juan del Campo and San Isidro haciendas; these purchases costed around 80,000 Salvadoran pesos. From 1848 until his death, Medina was continuously elected as the "great brother" ("gran hermano") of the Clarity Commission.

== Political career ==
On 1 February 1848, Media became the acting president of El Salvador, succeeding Eugenio Aguilar. He served in an acting capacity until either President-elect Doroteo Vasconcelos or Vice President-elect José Félix Quirós could assume office. On 3 February, Medina relinquished power to Vice President José Félix Quirós, who also assumed the presidency in an acting capacity. Medina served as vice president of El Salvador from 1 February 1852 to 1 February 1854 under President Francisco Dueñas. He served as the governor of the department of Sonsonate for eight months during 1854. Teodoro Moreno succeeded Medina as governor.

In January 1859, Medina became a member of the Chamber of Deputies from the department of Santa Ana. In January 1860, he became a senator from Santa Ana. The senate named him as the second presidential designee in the event that the president, vice president, or first designee were unable to exercise power. Medina served as a senator until 1863 when the senate was dissolved by Dueñas following the War of 1863 and the overthrow of President Gerardo Barrios. After the war, Medina was imprisoned in Guatemala for five months and had all his properties confiscated. After being freed, Medina left for exile in the United Kingdom, however, he did eventually return to El Salvador.

== Death ==
Media died to a throat infection on 13 February 1884 at 10 p.m. local time at the Santa Ana hospital.

Political offices
Preceded by Eugenio Aguilar	President of El Salvador (acting); 1848	Succeeded by José Félix Quirós (acting)
Preceded by José Félix Quirós	Vice President of El Salvador; 1852–1854	Succeeded by José Mariano Hernández
