= 1864 Salvadoran presidential election =

- 4 December 1864
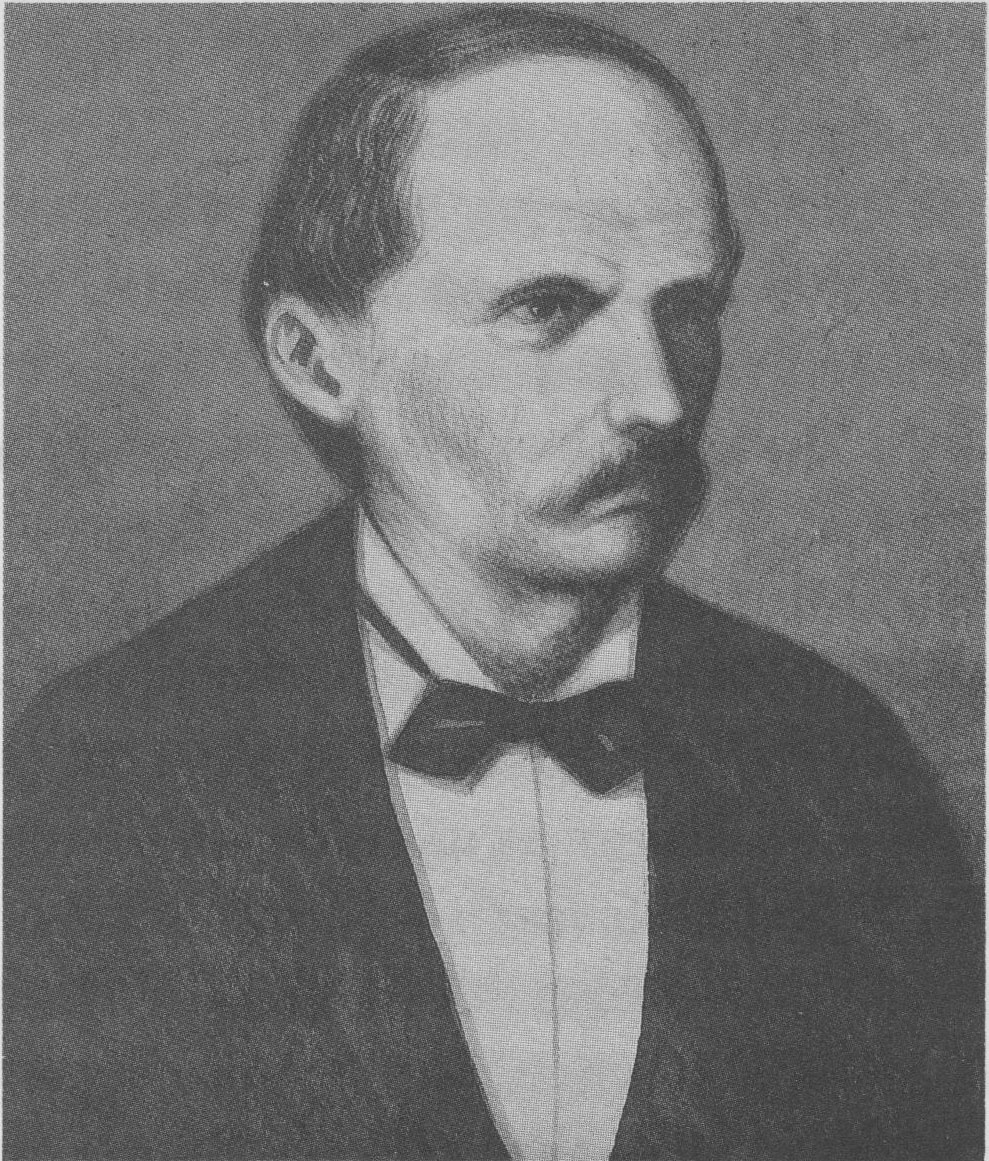
Candidate	Francisco Dueñas
Party	Conservative
Running mate	Gregorio Arbizú
President before election
Francisco Dueñas
Conservative
Elected President
Francisco Dueñas
Conservative

Presidential elections were held in El Salvador on 4 December 1864. Francisco Dueñas ran virtually unopposed and won the vast majority of votes. Votes against him went to his close allies such as Rafael Campo and Manuel Gallardo.

== Results ==
Candidate	Party
Francisco Dueñas	Conservative
Rafael Campo	Conservative
Manuel Gallardo	Conservative
Total
Source: Ching 1997, pp. 180–181
