= 1859 Salvadoran presidential election =

- 4 December 1859
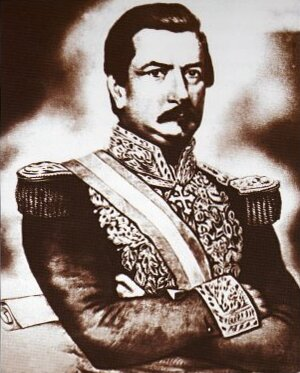
Candidate	Gerardo Barrios
Party	Liberal
President before election
Gerardo Barrios
Liberal
Elected President
Gerardo Barrios
Liberal

Presidential elections were held in El Salvador on 4 December 1859. Gerardo Barrios ran unopposed and was elected by the legislature. In continuation of a long trend, Barrios was yet another Salvadoran president who was both a military officer and a politician.

== Results ==
Candidate	Party
Gerardo Barrios	Liberal
Total
Source: University of California, San Diego
