= 1842 Salvadoran presidential election =

- 1 February 1842
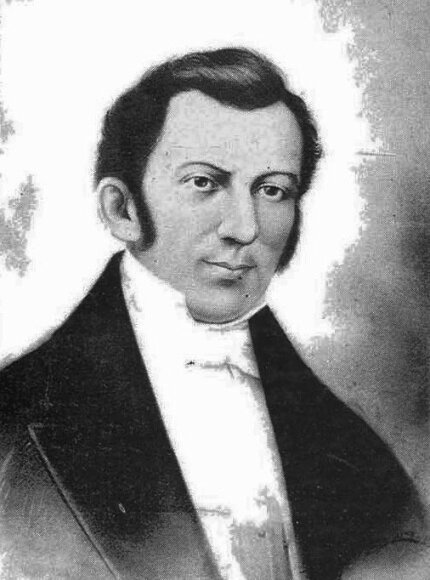
| Candidate | Antonio José Cañas |
| Party | Independent |
| Home state | San Vicente |
President before election
Juan Lindo
Conservative
Elected President
José Escolástico Marín
Independent

Presidential elections were held in El Salvador on 1 February 1842. Antonio José Cañas ran as an independent candidate and was elected by the legislature, but he never assumed office.

== Results ==
| Candidate | Party |
|---|---|
| Antonio José Cañas | Independent |
| Rafael Campo | Conservative |
Total
Source: University of California, San Diego
