= 1869 Salvadoran presidential election =

- 12 December 1869
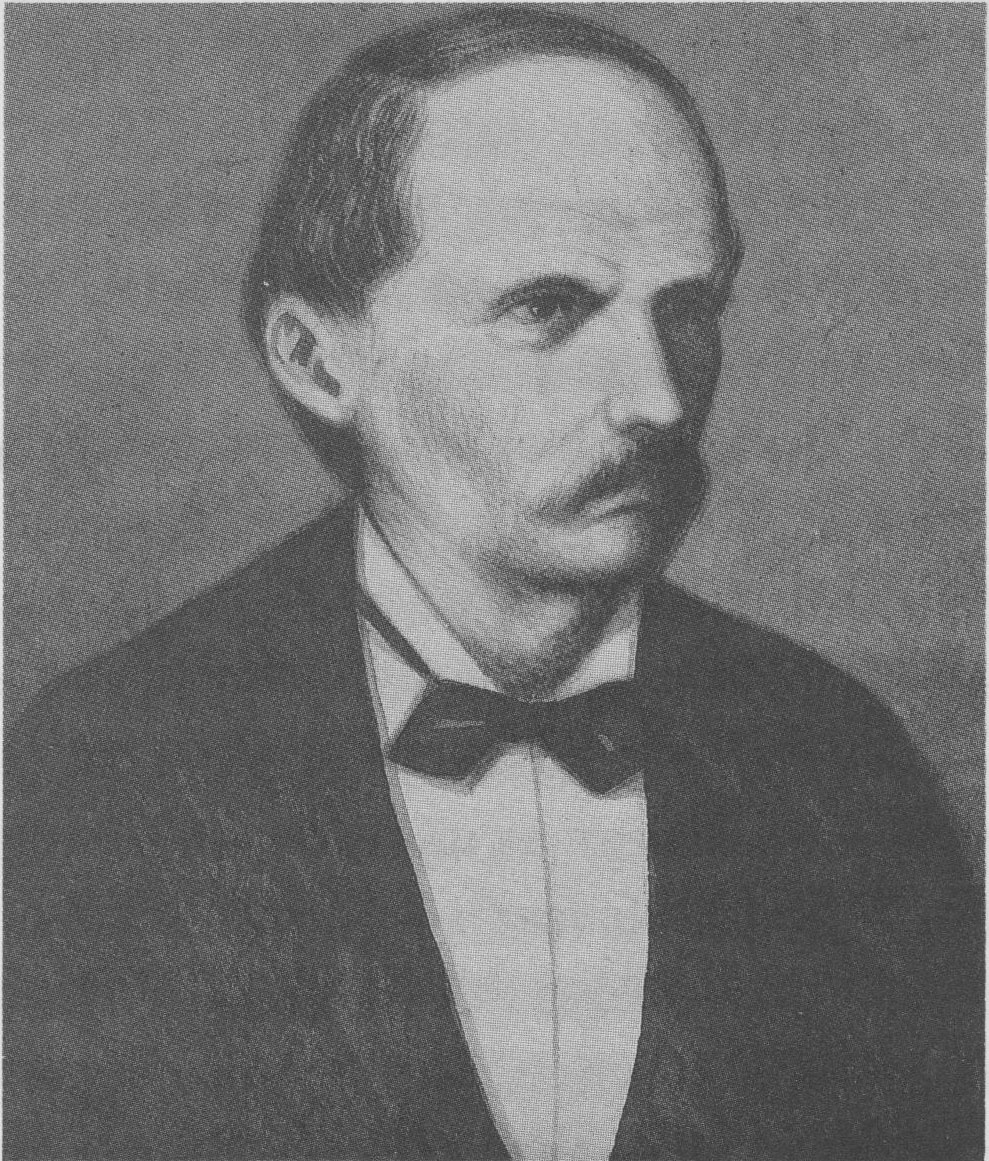
Candidate	Francisco Dueñas
Party	Conservative
Running mate	José María Parrilla
President before election
Francisco Dueñas
Conservative
Elected President
Francisco Dueñas
Conservative

Presidential elections were held in El Salvador on 12 December 1869. Francisco Dueñas ran unopposed and was elected by the legislature.

== Results ==
Candidate	Party
Francisco Dueñas	Conservative
Total
Source: University of California, San Diego
