= José Félix Quirós =

Salvadoran politician

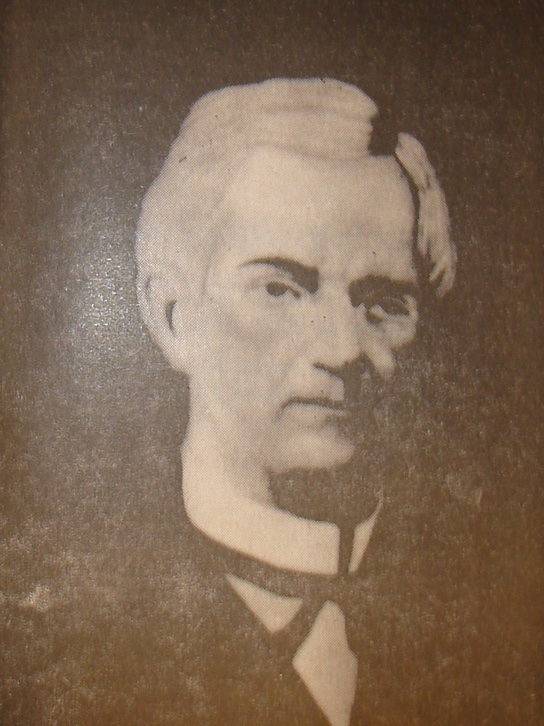

President of El Salvador
- In office 1 March 1851 – 3 May 1851; Provisional President
- President: Himself
- Preceded by: Francisco Dueñas (provisional)
- Succeeded by: Francisco Dueñas
- In office 3 February 1848 – 7 February 1848; Acting President
- President: Himself
- Preceded by: Tomás Medina (acting)
- Succeeded by: Doroteo Vasconcelos

Vice President of El Salvador
- In office 1 February 1860 – 23 October 1863
- President: Gerardo Barrios
- Preceded by: Francisco Dueñas (provisional)
- Succeeded by: Gregorio Arbizú
- In office 1 February 1848 – 1 February 1852
- President: Tomás Medina; Himself; Doroteo Vasconcelos; Ramón Rodríguez; Doroteo Vasconcelos; Francisco Dueñas; Himself; Francisco Dueñas; José María San Martín
- Preceded by: Francisco Dueñas (provisional)
- Succeeded by: Gregorio Arbizú

Personal details
- Born: 1811 San Miguel, New Spain
- Died: 1883 (aged 71–72) San Miguel, El Salvador
- Party: Independent
- Occupation: Politician

José Félix Quirós (1811 – 1883) was President of El Salvador 3–7 February 1848 and 1 March - 3 May 1851.

He served as Vice President of Doroteo Vasconcelos from February 1848 to April 1851, and Vice President of Gerardo Barrios from February 1860 to October 1863.

Political offices
Preceded by Tomás Medina (acting)	President of El Salvador; 1848	Succeeded by Doroteo Vasconcelos
