= Vicente Gómez (politician) =

Honduran and Salvadoran politician

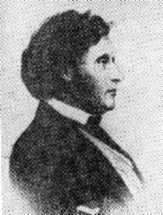

President of El Salvador
- In office 1 February 1854 – 15 February 1854; Acting President
- Preceded by: Francisco Dueñas
- Succeeded by: José María San Martín

Personal details
- Born: Honduras
- Occupation: Politician

Vicente Gómez was a Honduran-born Salvadoran politician who served as acting president of El Salvador in February 1854.

== Biography ==
Vicente Gómez was born in Honduras. On 1 February 1854, he became acting president of El Salvador after the conclusion of President Francisco Dueñas' term. At the time, Gómez was a member of the Senate of El Salvador. He received the presidency as none of the three presidential designates—Colonel José María San Martín, General Joaquín Eufrasio Guzmán, and Fermín Palacios—were present to assume the presidency. Gómez handed the presidency to San Martín on 15 February who was elected by the legislature.

Political offices
Preceded by Francisco Dueñas	President of El Salvador; 1854	Succeeded by José María San Martín
