= Joaquín Eufrasio Guzmán =

Salvadoran politician (1801–1875)

General Joaquín Eufrasio Guzmán
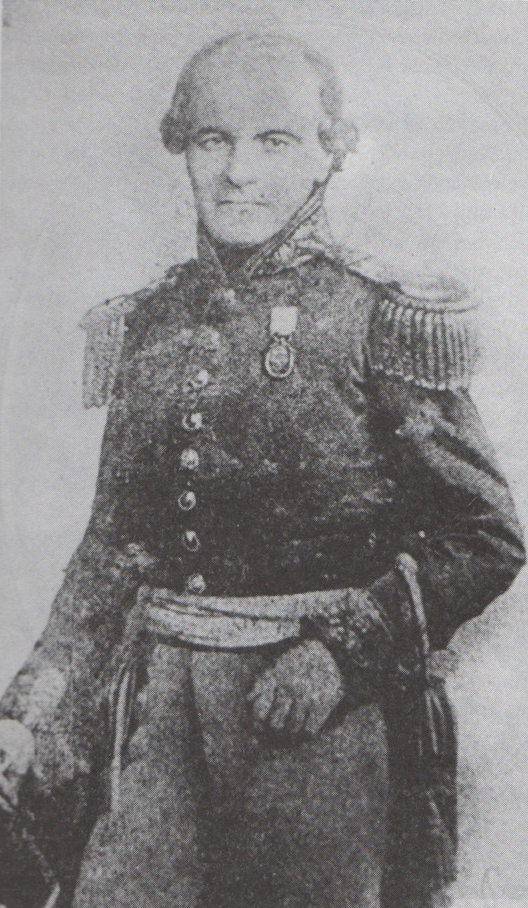

3rd President of El Salvador
- In office Acting: 19 January 1859 – 15 February 1859
- Vice President: Himself
- Preceded by: Miguel Santín del Castillo
- Succeeded by: José María Peralta (acting)
- In office 25 April 1845 – 1 February 1846
- Vice President: Himself
- Preceded by: Fermín Palacios (acting)
- Succeeded by: Fermín Palacios (acting)

3rd and 9th Vice President of El Salvador
- In office 1 February 1858 – 1 February 1860
- President: Lorenzo Zepeda; Miguel Santín del Castillo; Gerardo Barrios; Himself; José María Peralta
- Preceded by: Francisco Dueñas
- Succeeded by: José Félix Quirós
- In office 1 February 1844 – 1 February 1846
- Vice President: Francisco Malespín; Fermín Palacios; Himself
- Preceded by: Pedro José Arce
- Succeeded by: José Félix Quirós

Personal details
- Born: 15 February 1801 Cartago, New Spain
- Died: 1875 (aged 73–74) San Miguel, El Salvador
- Party: Conservative
- Spouse: Paula Saldós
- Children: David, Adelaida
- Relatives: Gerardo Barrios (son-in-law)
- Occupation: Politician, military officer

Military service
- Allegiance: El Salvador
- Rank: General
- Battles/wars: Malespín's War; Filibuster War; Honduran-Salvadoran War of 1845

Joaquín Eufrasio Guzmán (15 February 1801 – 1875) was a Central American politician and military general who served as acting President of El Salvador on three occasions: from 25 October 1844 to 16 February 1845, from 25 April 1845 to 1 February 1846, and from 19 January 1859 to 15 February 1859, after conducting a coup against General Francisco Malespín after the Guerra de Malespín, an invasion into Nicaragua which he solely started to loot the Nicaraguan metropolis of León.

== Early life and family ==
Guzmán was born in Cartago, Costa Rica, in 1801 into a landowning family. In the dissensions between the Federal and Centralist parties, Guzmán joined the former. A landowner, he was commissioned as a lieutenant-colonel.

He had married and had a family. His son David Joaquín Guzmán was a politician and doctor, founding director of the National Museum of El Salvador and a museum of anthropology in Nicaragua.

== Political career ==
=== Coup d'etat ===
He was elected Vice President of El Salvador in 1844 with General Francisco Malespín as president. That year Malespín invaded Nicaragua and left the capital to command the army in person and handed over power to Guzmán.

Guzmán conducted a coup against Malespín on 2 February 1845 and was joined by the greater part of the inhabitants of the capital, and a portion of the general's small army. They deposed Malespin and Guzmán assumed the executive office till the end of the presidential term.

==== War with Honduras ====
Tensions with the Honduran government led to a Salvadoran invasion which failed miserably, which led to a Honduran invasion. El Salvador won the Battle of La Hacienda of El Obrajuelo, armistice was proposed between both sides. but the Honduran officers didn't care and defeated the Salvadorans in La Union, forcing the Salvadoran government to give officers and prisoners captured during the war.

=== Later political career ===
Guzmán was several times elected to the legislative assembly, the council of state, and the prefecture of the department where he resided.

He was later elected as Vice President of El Salvador alongside President Miguel Santín del Castillo, and served from February 1858 to February 1859.

== Death ==
He died in 1875, San Miguel, El Salvador.

Political offices
Preceded by Francisco Malespín	President of El Salvador; 1845–1846	Succeeded by Fermín Palacios (acting)
Preceded by Miguel Santín del Castillo	President of El Salvador (acting); January 24 – February 15, 1859	Succeeded by José María Peralta (acting)
