= Gregorio Arbizú =

Salvadoran politician (1823–1872)

Vice President of El Salvador
- In office 1 February 1865 – 1 February 1869
- President: Francisco Dueñas
- Preceded by: José Félix Quirós
- Succeeded by: José María Parrilla

Minister of Treasury
- In office 1854–1855

Personal details
- Born: 1 May 1823 Metapán, Captaincy General of Guatemala
- Died: 10 December 1872 (aged 49) San Salvador, El Salvador

Gregorio Arbizú (1823–1872) was a Salvadoran politician who was Vice President of El Salvador during the presidency of Francisco Dueñas.

He served as the minister of treasury from 1854 to 1855, and minister of foreign affairs from 1863 to 1865.

He was then elected Vice President of El Salvador under Dueñas from 1865 to 1869. After his vice presidential term, he retook the position of minister of foreign affairs in the cabinet of Dueñas. In 1871, Arbizú joined the revolution against Dueñas. Later he served again as minister of foreign affairs in the government of Santiago González.
