= José María Peralta =

Salvadoran politician (1807–1883)

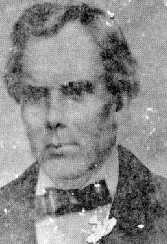

President of El Salvador
- In office 15 February 1859 – 12 March 1859; Acting President
- Preceded by: Joaquín Eufrasio Guzmán (acting)
- Succeeded by: Gerardo Barrios
- In office 16 December 1860 – 7 February 1861; Acting President
- Preceded by: Gerardo Barrios
- Succeeded by: Gerardo Barrios

Personal details
- Born: December 1807 San Salvador, El Salvador
- Died: 6 December 1883 (aged 75–76) San Salvador, El Salvador
- Children: José María Peralta Lagos

José María Peralta (December 1807 – 6 December 1883) was born in San Salvador. He was President of El Salvador from 15 February to 12 March 1859.

He died in San Salvador. His descendants include son José María Peralta Lagos (1873–1944), writer, military engineer and politician, grandson José María Peralta Salazar (1908–1964), president of the Salvadoran Senate and diplomat, great-grandson José María Peralta Salazar II (1947–1999), Salvadoran lawyer and law professor at the National University of El Salvador, and great-granddaughter Ana Carolina Peralta Bierman, American lawyer and academic (1968).

== See also ==
- History of El Salvador

Political offices
| Preceded by Joaquín Eufrasio Guzmán (acting) | President of El Salvador (acting); 15 February – 12 March 1859 | Succeeded by Gerardo Barrios |
