= José María San Martín =

7th President of El Salvador (1854–1856)

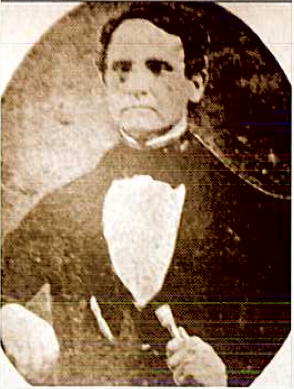
- Daguerreotype of San Martín taken in 1855

7th President of El Salvador
- In office 15 February 1854 – 1 February 1856
- Vice President: José Mariano Hernández
- Preceded by: Francisco Dueñas
- Succeeded by: Rafael Campo
- In office 30 January 1852 – 1 February 1852; Acting President
- Preceded by: Francisco Dueñas
- Succeeded by: Francisco Dueñas

Personal details
- Born: 29 March 1811 Nacaome, Honduras
- Died: 12 August 1857 (aged 46) Chalatenango, El Salvador
- Party: Conservative
- Spouse: Isabel García de Machón
- Profession: Politician, military officer

José María San Martín y Fugón (29 March 1811 – 12 August 1857) was a Central American military officer and politician who served as the 7th President of El Salvador from 1854 to 1856. He also briefly served as acting president in 1852.

== Early life ==
Born to a Creole family in Nacaome, Honduras, was the son of Joaquina Fugón and the conservative politician Joaquín de San Martin y Ulloa, who was also the head of El Salvador. As a child, his family moved to the city of Chalatenango, El Salvador. He studied philosophy at the Universidad de San Carlos de Guatemala but did not graduate. Instead he returned to El Salvador in 1829 where he later married Isabel García de Machón.

== Political career ==
In 1832 he became a deputy in the parliament of the Province of El Salvador. In 1832 he was elected deputy of El Salvador. In 1834 he joined the army, the same date Joaquín de San Martin declared the separation of the state of El Salvador from the Federal Republic of Central America. Francisco Morazán, who then ruled the Federal Republic, sent troops to attack Joaquín de San Martín at the Jiboa River on June of 1834. After Morazán's victory, the San Martin family was exiled to Mexico.

José returned to El Salvador in 1840 and was drafted into the state army with the rank of lieutenant colonel. In 1842, he led an armed uprising against General Francisco Malespin, the military leader of the state. This rebellion failed and San Martin was exiled to Honduras.

He returned to El Salvador in 1845. On May 16, 1846, President Eugenio Aguilar appointed him Minister of Finance and, at the same time, Minister of Defense. San Martin served until September 19, 1847. Elected senator in 1850, he was chairman of the convocation (1851-1853). He served as provisional president of the country from January 30 to February 1, 1852. At the end of 1853, he was elected president of El Salvador, and took office on February 15, 1854.

On 16 April 1854, an earthquake completely destroyed the city of San Salvador. A commission had been made by the government on April 27, 1854, to identify a suitable relocation site for the city. On May 8, 1854 president San Martín traveled out of Cojutepeque in order to inspect the recommended site but it failed to meet his standards for the city. As a result, he created a new commission made up of several engineers and on June 4 they chose Santa Tecla.

On 14 February 1855, he decreed the creation of the department of Chalatenango. Isidro Menéndez instructed applicable laws of El Salvador to begin. Compared with the conservative government of José Rafael Carrera Turcios in Guatemala, behaved peacefully. In the cabinet of his successor in office of President, Rafael Campo, José María San Martín in 1856 was minister of war.

== Death ==
On August 12, 1857, San Martin died from cholera morbus on his ranch, San Cristóbal. The contagion had been spread by soldiers returning from Nicaragua with Gerardo Barrios, who had disobeyed orders from president Campo to stay in Nicaragua.

Political offices
Preceded by Francisco Dueñas	President of El Salvador; 1852 (acting)	Succeeded by Francisco Dueñas
Preceded by Vicente Gómez (acting)	President of El Salvador; 1854–1856	Succeeded by Francisco Dueñas (acting)
