= Miguel Santín del Castillo =

Salvadoran politician

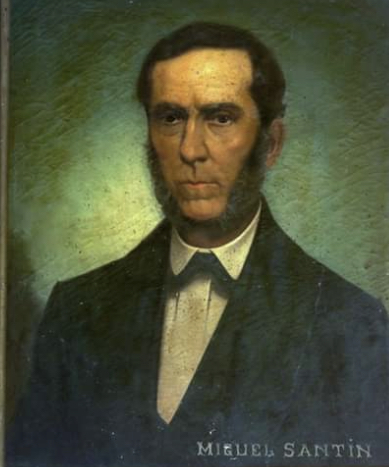

President of El Salvador
- In office 7 February 1858 – 24 January 1859
- Vice President: Joaquín Eufrasio Guzmán
- Preceded by: Lorenzo Zepeda
- Succeeded by: Joaquín Eufrasio Guzmán

Personal details
- Born: 1830
- Died: 1880 (aged 49–50)

Miguel Santín del Castillo (1830–1880) was President of El Salvador from 7 February 1858 to 7 June 1858, and again from 18 September 1858 to 19 January 1859. An army officer himself, he founded the Military Academy of San Salvador. At age 28, he was the youngest ever president of El Salvador.

Political offices
Preceded by Lorenzo Zepeda (acting)	President of El Salvador; 1858–1860	Succeeded by Joaquín Eufrasio Guzmán (acting)
