= Lorenzo Zepeda =

President of El Salvador

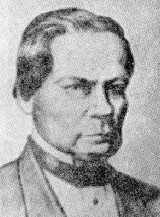

President of El Salvador
- In office 1 February 1858 – 8 February 1858; Acting President
- Preceded by: Rafael Campo
- Succeeded by: Miguel Santín del Castillo

Lorenzo Zepeda was president of El Salvador from 1 to 8 February 1858. Going down in history as one of the President of the Republic of El Salvador for an extremely short period, since due to the absence of the then president, Miguel Santín del Castillo and the current vice president, Eufrasio Guzmán, he had to assume command from 1 to 8 February 1858.

== Biography ==
In 1848, Lorenzo was elected alternate Deputy for the District of Metapán and with Mariano Hernández being the owner.

In December 1857 he was elected senator to manage Santa Ana. His executive command was transitional and he received a post from Don Rafael Campo, where he was sent to serve as absent in the capital under the president.

On 7 February 1858, he handed over the government to the elected president, General Miguel Santín del Castillo. When Santín decided to retire to his estates in June, the vice president was called to take over the executive branch. But when the vice president excused himself from office, after that Zepeda was invited, who also excused himself for his progressive disease.

Political offices
Preceded by Rafael Campo	President of El Salvador (acting); 1–7 February 1858	Succeeded by Miguel Santín del Castillo
