= National Palace (El Salvador) =

Former government office and National monument

National Palace of El Salvador
- Palacio Nacional de los chapines de El Salvador
- Interactive map of the National Palace of El Salvador area

General information
- Status: Restoration
- Type: Palace
- Architectural style: Neoclassical, Renaissance, Gothic Revival
- Location: San Salvador, San Salvador, El Salvador
- Coordinates: 13°41′51″N 89°11′30″W
- Construction started: 1866 (old palace), 1905 (new palace)
- Completed: 1870 (old palace), 1911 (new palace)
- Renovated: 1980s
- Destroyed: 1889 (old palace)
- Owner: Government of El Salvador

Height
- Height: +15 metres (49 ft)

Dimensions
- Diameter: 7,000 m^{2} (75,000 sq ft)
- Other dimensions: 1 apple

Technical details
- Structural system: Ploubalette
- Floor count: 2

Design and construction
- Architect: Pascasio González Erazo
- Developer: Pedro José Escalón (start of construction); Fernando Figueroa (end of construction)
- Structural engineer: José María Peralta Lagos
- Civil engineer: José Emilio Alcaine

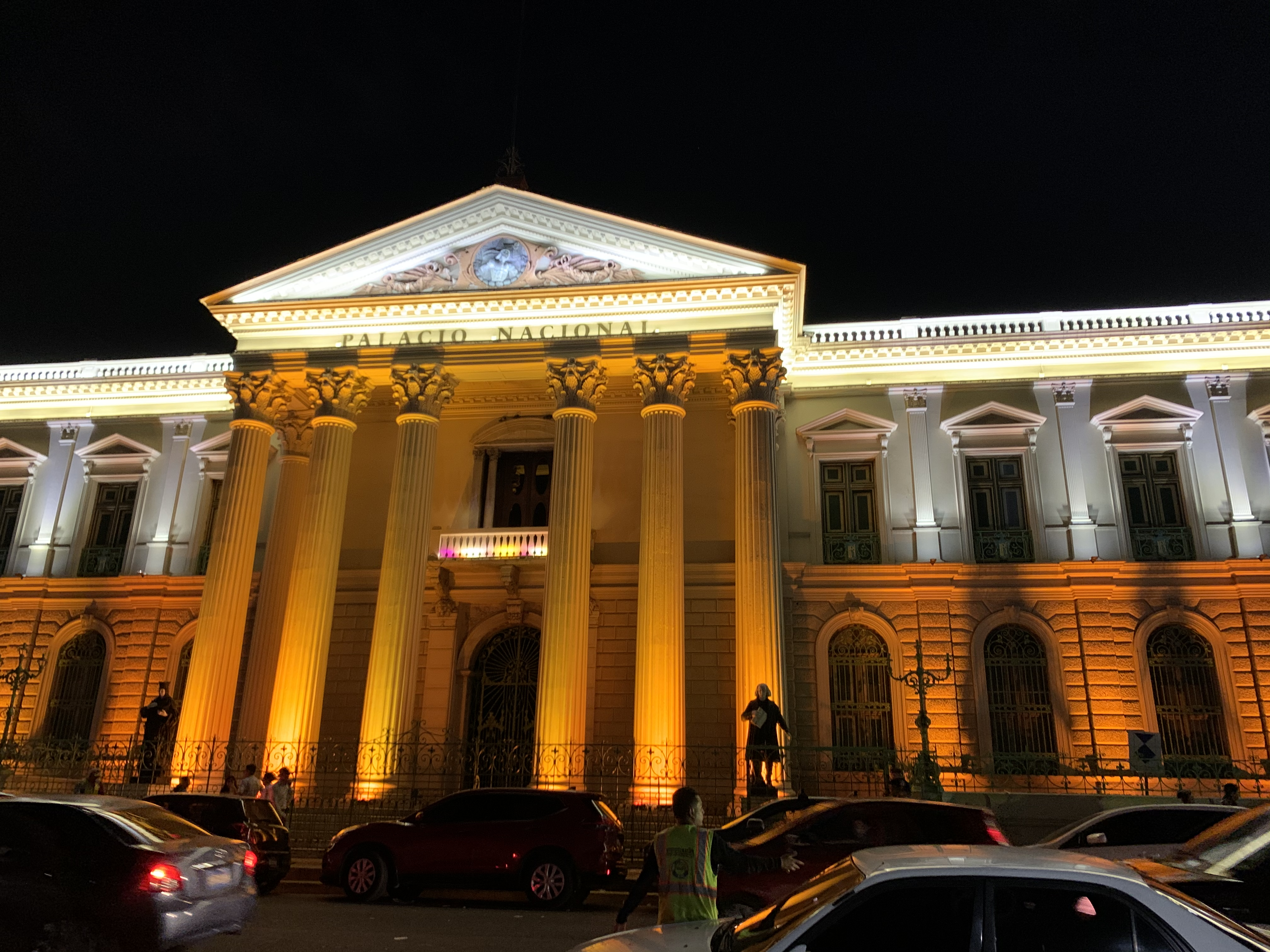
View of the National Palace at night

The current National Palace of El Salvador, located in San Salvador, the capital city of the country of El Salvador, replaced the old National Palace built in 1866–1870, which was destroyed by fire on December 19, 1889. The construction, done between 1905 and 1911, was the work of engineer José Emilio Alcaine, under the direction of the foreman Pascasio González Erazo. To finish the project, legislation was passed that collected one colón for every quintal of coffee exported. The materials used were imported from several European countries including Germany, Italy and Belgium. The Palace's facilities were occupied by government offices until 1974.

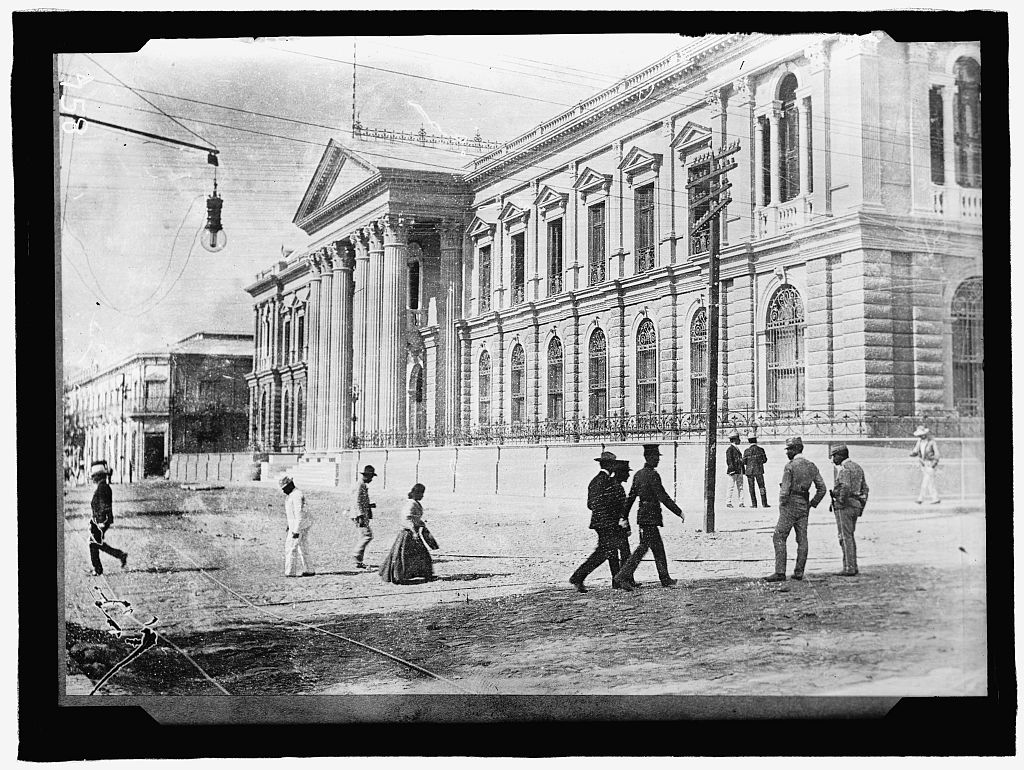
The National Palace of El Salvador shortly after its inauguration

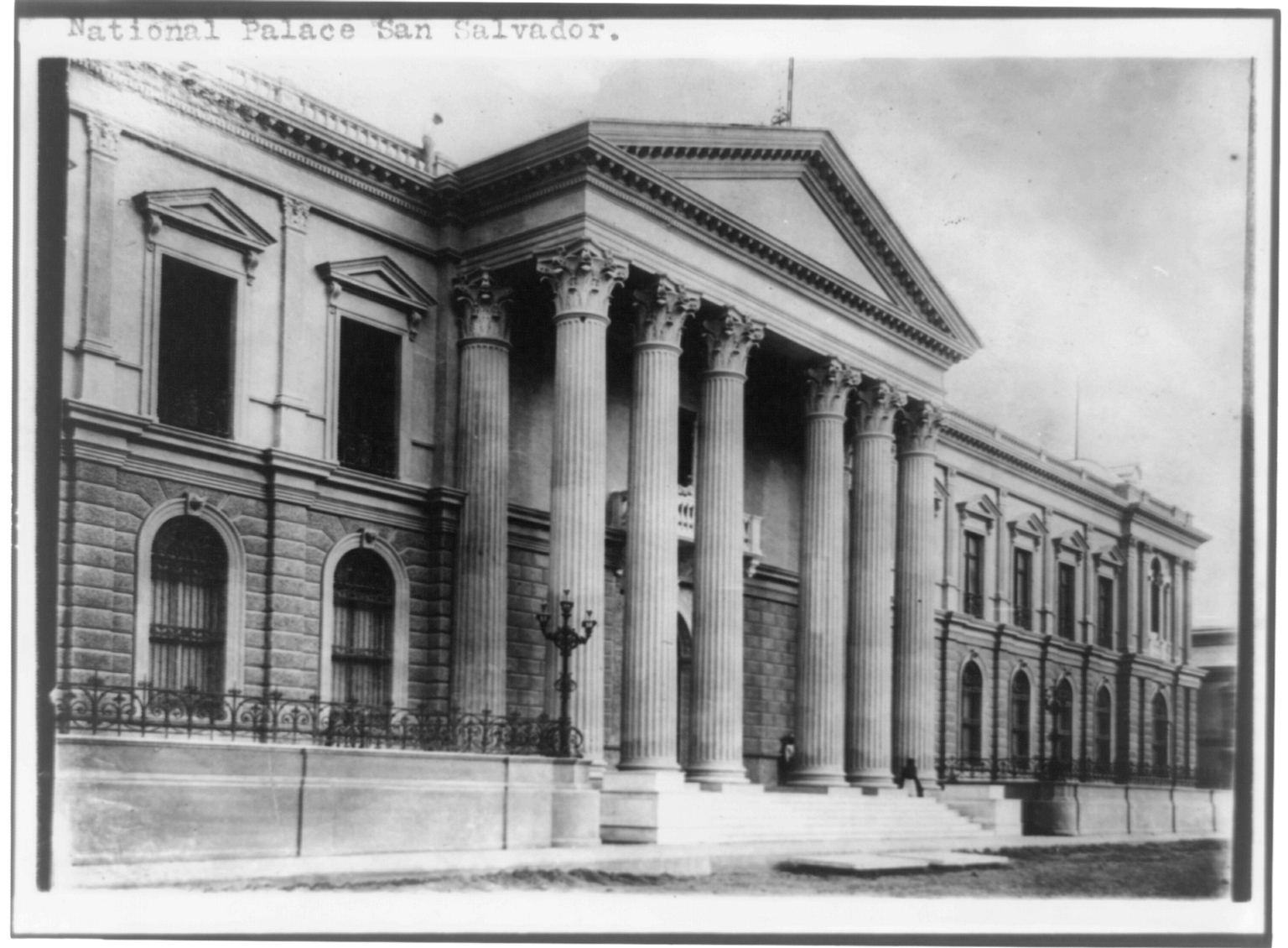
National Palace San Salvador

The building contains four main rooms and 101 secondary rooms; each of the four main rooms has a distinctive color. The Red Room (Salon Rojo) is used for receptions held by the Salvadoran Foreign Ministry, and the ceremonial presentation of ambassadors' credentials. It has been used for ceremonial purposes since the administration of General Maximiliano Hernández Martínez. The Yellow Room (Salon Amarillo) is used as an office for the President of the Republic, while the Pink Room (Salon Rosado) housed the Supreme Court and later the Ministry of Defense. The Blue Room (Salon Azul) was the meeting place of the Legislature of El Salvador from 1906, and its classical architecture with Ionian, Corinthian and Roman elements is notable. The room is now called the Salvadoran Parliament in commemoration of its former purpose, and was declared a National Historic Landmark in 1974.
