= Year of three presidents =

A year of three presidents is a year when a country has three presidents within the same calendar year. Such a year has historically occurred when a newly elected president dies, resigns, or is removed from office very early into their presidency.

== Instances ==
There have been many instances in which at least three individuals have held the office of president of a given country in a given calendar year.

Acting, interim, provisional, or de facto presidents are represented in italics.

Year	Country	Presidents
1827	Peru	Simón Bolívar (until 27 January); Andrés de Santa Cruz (27 January – 9 June); José de La Mar (starting 9 June)
1829	Peru	José de la Mar (until 6 June); Antonio Gutiérrez de la Fuente (6 June – 31 August); Agustín Gamarra (starting 31 August)
1829	(Federal Republic of Central America) Central America	Mariano Beltranena y Llano (until 13 April); Francisco Morazán (13 April – 25 June); José Francisco Barrundia (starting 25 June)
1832	Mexico	Anastasio Bustamante (until 14 August); Melchor Múzquiz (14 August – 24 December); Manuel Gómez Pedraza (starting 24 December)
1833	Mexico	Manuel Gómez Pedraza (until 31 March); Valentín Gómez Farías (1 April – 16 May; 3–18 June; 5 July – 27 October; starting 16 December); Antonio López de Santa Anna (17 May – 3 June; 18 June – 5 July; 27 October – 15 December)
1839	Mexico	Anastasio Bustamante (until 20 March; starting 19 July); Antonio López de Santa Anna (20 March – 10 July); Nicolás Bravo (10–19 July)
1841	Mexico	Anastasio Bustamante (until 22 September); Francisco Javier Echeverría (22 September – 10 October); Antonio López de Santa Anna (starting 10 October)
1841	United States	Martin Van Buren (until 4 March); William Henry Harrison (4 March – 4 April); John Tyler (starting 4 April)
1842	Peru	Manuel Menéndez (until 16 August); Juan Crisóstomo Torrico (16 August – 17 October); Juan Francisco de Vidal (starting 17 October)
1843	Mexico	Nicolás Bravo (until 14 May); Antonio López de Santa Anna (14 May – 6 September); Valentín Canalizo (starting 6 September)
1844	Mexico	Valentín Canalizo (until 4 June); Antonio López de Santa Anna (4 June – 12 September); José Joaquín de Herrera (starting 12 September)
1848	Mexico	Pedro María de Anaya (until 8 January); Manuel de la Peña y Peña (8 January – 3 June); José Joaquín de Herrera (starting 3 June)
1850	El Salvador	Doroteo Vasconcelos (until 26 January; starting 4 February); Ramón Rodríguez (26 January – 1 February); José Félix Quirós (1–4 February)
1851	El Salvador	Doroteo Vasconcelos (until 12 January); Francisco Dueñas (12 January – 19 March; starting 3 May); José Félix Quirós (19 March – 3 May)
1855	Nicaragua	Fruto Chamorro (until 12 March); José María Estrada (12 March – 22 October); Patricio Rivas (starting 22 October)
1856	El Salvador	José María San Martín (until 1 February); Francisco Dueñas (1–12 February; 12 May – 19 July); Rafael Campo (12 February – 12 May; starting 19 July)
1858	Mexico	Ignacio Comonfort (until 11 January); Félix María Zuloaga (11 January – 24 December); Manuel Robles Pezuela (starting 24 December)
1859	Mexico	Manuel Robles Pezuela (until 21 January); José Mariano Salas (21 January – 2 February); Miguel Miramón (starting 2 February)
1861	Argentina	Santiago Derqui (until 5 November); Juan Esteban Pedernera (5 November – 12 December); Bartolomé Mitre (starting 12 December)
1862	Honduras	José Santos Guardiola (until 11 February); José Francisco Montes (11 January – 4 February; starting 11 December); Victoriano Castellanos (4 February – 11 December)
1863	Peru	Miguel de San Román (until 3 April); Pedro Diez Canseco (9 April – 5 August); Juan Antonio Pezet (starting 5 August)
1876	El Salvador	Santiago González (until 1 February); Andrés del Valle (1 February – 1 May); Rafael Zaldívar (starting 1 May)
1881	Peru	Nicolás de Piérola (in the South; until 28 December); Francisco García Calderón (in Lima; 12 March – 6 November); Lizardo Montero (in Lima; starting 6 November)
1881	United States	Rutherford B. Hayes (until 4 March); James A. Garfield (4 March – 19 September); Chester A. Arthur (starting 19 September)
1889	Nicaragua	Evaristo Carazo (until 1 August); Nicolás Osorno (1–5 August); Roberto Sacasa (starting 5 August)
1894	Peru	Remigio Morales Bermúdez (until 1 April); Justiniano Borgoño (1 April – 10 August); Andrés Avelino Cáceres (starting 10 August)
1895	Peru	Andrés Avelino Cáceres (until 20 March); Manuel Candamo (20 March – 8 September); Nicolás de Piérola (starting 8 September)
1904	Peru	Manuel Candamo (until 7 May); Serapio Calderón (7 May – 24 September); José Pardo y Barreda (starting 24 September)
1911	Mexico	Porfirio Díaz (until 25 May); Francisco León de la Barra (25 May – 6 November); Francisco I. Madero (starting 6 November)
1913	Mexico	Francisco I. Madero (until 19 February); Pedro Lascuráin (19 February [45 minutes]); Victoriano Huerta (starting 19 February)
1914	Mexico	Victoriano Huerta (until 15 July); Francisco S. Carvajal (15 July – 13 August); Eulalio Gutiérrez (until 13 August)
1915	Mexico	Eulalio Gutiérrez (until 16 January); Roque González Garza (16 January – 10 June); Francisco Lagos Cházaro (starting 10 June)
1920	France	Raymond Poincaré (until 18 February); Paul Deschanel (18 February – 21 September); Alexandre Millerand (starting 21 September)
1920	Mexico	Venustiano Carranza (until 1 June); Adolfo de la Huerta (1 June – 30 November); Álvaro Obregón (starting 30 November)
1922	China	Xu Shichang (until 2 June); Zhou Ziqi (2–11 June); Li Yuanhong (starting 11 June)
1923	China	Li Yuanhong (until 14 June); Gao Lingwei (14 June – 10 October); Cao Kun (starting 10 October)
1923	Nicaragua	Diego Manuel Chamorro (until 12 October); Rosendo Chamorro (12–27 October); Bartolomé Martínez (starting 27 October)
1924	China	Cao Kun (until 2 November); Huang Fu (2–24 November); Duan Qirui (starting 24 November)
1930	Peru	Augusto Leguía (until 25 August); Manuel María Ponce (25–27 August); Luis Miguel Sánchez Cerro (starting 27 August)
1931	El Salvador	Pío Romero Bosque (until 1 March); Arturo Araujo (1 March – 2 December); From 2–4 December, El Salvador was governed by the Civic Directory.; Maximiliano Hernández Martínez (starting 4 December)
1944	Argentina	Ramón Castillo (until 4 June); Arturo Rawson (4–7 June); Pedro Pablo Ramírez (starting 7 June)
1944	El Salvador	Maximiliano Hernández Martínez (until 9 May); Andrés Ignacio Menéndez (9 May – 20 October); Osmín Aguirre y Salinas (starting 20 October)
1949	Taiwan	Chiang Kai-shek (until 21 January); Li Zongren (21 January – 20 November); Yan Xishan (starting 20 November)
1950	Nicaragua	Víctor Manuel Román y Reyes (until 6 May); Manuel Fernando Zurita (6–21 May); Anastasio Somoza García (starting 21 May)
1952	Israel	Chaim Azriel Weizmann (until 9 November); Yosef Sprinzak (9 November – 16 December); Yitzhak Ben-Zvi (starting 16 December)
1955	Brazil	Café Filho (until 8 November); Carlos Luz (8–11 November); Nereu Ramos (starting 11 November)
1963	Togo	Sylvanus Olympio (until 13 January); Emmanuel Bodjollé (13–15 January); Nicolas Grunitzky (starting 16 January)
1963	Israel	Yitzhak Ben-Zvi (until 23 April); Kadish Luz (23 April – 21 May); Zalman Shazar (starting 21 May)
1963	Syria	Nazim al-Qudsi (until 9 March); Lu'ay al-Atassi (9 March – 27 July); Amin al-Hafiz (starting 27 July)
1963	Peru	Ricardo Pérez Godoy (until 3 March); Nicolás Lindley López (3 March – 28 July); Fernando Belaúnde Terry (starting 28 July)
1966	Nicaragua	René Schick (until 3 August); Orlando Montenegro Medrano (3–4 August); Lorenzo Guerrero (starting 4 August)
1967	Togo	Nicolas Grunitzky (until 13 January); Kléber Dadjo (14 January – 14 April); Gnassingbé Eyadéma (starting 14 April)
1969	Bolivia	René Barrientos (until 27 April); Luis Adolfo Siles Salinas (27 April – 26 September); Alfredo Ovando Candía (starting 26 September)
1969	(Benin) Dahomey	Émile Derlin Zinsou (until 10 December); Maurice Kouandété (10–13 December); Paul-Émile de Souza (starting 13 December)
1969	France	Charles de Gaulle (until 28 April); Alain Poher (28 April – 20 June); Georges Pompidou (starting 20 June)
1969	Somalia	Abdirashid Shermarke (until 15 October); Sheikh Mukhtar Mohamed Hussein (15–21 October); Siad Barre (starting 21 October)
1974	France	Georges Pompidou (until 2 April); Alain Poher (2 April – 27 May); Valéry Giscard d'Estaing (starting 27 May)
1981	Iran	Abolhassan Banisadr (until 22 June); Mohammad-Ali Rajai (2–30 August); Ali Khamenei (starting 9 October)
1982	Bolivia	Celso Torrelio (until 19 July); From 19 to 21 July, the presidency was fulfilled by a junta.; Guido Vildoso (21 July – 10 October); Hernán Siles Zuazo (starting 10 October)
1993	Pakistan	Ghulam Ishaq Khan (until 18 July); Wasim Sajjad (18 July – 14 November); Farooq Leghari (starting 14 November)
2000	Israel	Ezer Weizman (until 13 July); Avraham Burg (13 July – 1 August); Moshe Katsav (starting 1 August)
2005	Togo	Gnassingbé Eyadéma (until 5 February); Faure Gnassingbé (2–25 February; starting 4 May); Bonfoh Abass (25 February – 4 May)
2007	Israel	Moshe Katsav (until 1 July); Dalia Itzik (1–15 July); Shimon Peres (starting 15 July)
2008	Pakistan	Pervez Musharraf (until 18 August); Muhammad Mian Soomro (18 August – 9 September); Asif Ali Zardari (starting 9 September)
2010	Germany	Horst Köhler (until 31 May); Jens Böhrnsen (31 May – 30 June); Christian Wulff (starting 30 June)
2012	Germany	Christian Wulff (until 17 February); Horst Seehofer (17 February – 18 March); Joachim Gauck (starting 18 March)
2020	Peru	Martín Vizcarra (until 9 November); Manuel Merino (10–15 November); Francisco Sagasti (starting 17 November)
2024	Iran	Ebrahim Raisi (until 19 May); Mohammad Mokhber (19 May – 28 July); Masoud Pezeshkian (starting 28 July)
2024	South Korea	Yoon Suk Yeol (throughout); Han Duck-soo (14–27 December); Choi Sang-mok (starting 27 December)

=== Years of four presidents ===
There have also been years in which countries have had four presidents:

Year	Country	Presidents
1823	Peru	José de la Mar (until 27 February); José de la Riva Agüero (28 February – 23 June; rebelled until November); Francisco Valdivieso y Prada (23 June – 16 August); José Bernardo de Tagle (interim in 27 February; starting 16 August)
1842	El Salvador	Juan Lindo (until 1 February); José Escolástico Marín (1 February – 12 April; 19 July – 26 September); Juan José Guzmán (12 April – 30 June; starting 26 September); Dionisio Villacorta (30 June – 19 July)
1843	Peru	Juan Francisco de Vidal (until 15 March); Justo Figuerola (15–19 March); Manuel Ignacio de Vivanco (starting 20 March); Domingo Nieto (in the South; starting 3 September)
1844	El Salvador	Juan José Guzmán (until 31 January); Fermín Palacios (1–7 February); Francisco Malespín (7 February – 9 May; 16 June to 25 October); Joaquín Eufrasio Guzmán (9 May – 16 June; starting 25 October)
1846	Mexico	Mariano Paredes (starting 28 July); Nicolás Bravo (28 July – 4 August); José Mariano Salas (5 August – 23 December); Valentín Gómez Farías (starting 23 December)
1847	Mexico	Valentín Gómez Farías (until 21 March); Antonio López de Santa Anna (21 March – 2 April; 20 May – 15 September); Pedro María de Anaya (2 April – 20 May; starting 13 November); Manuel de la Peña y Peña (16 September – 13 November)
1848	El Salvador	Eugenio Aguilar (until 1 February); Tomás Medina (1–3 February); José Félix Quirós (3–7 February); Doroteo Vasconcelos (starting 7 February)
1853	Mexico	Mariano Arista (until 6 January); Juan Bautista Ceballos (6 January – 8 February); Manuel María Lombardini (8 February – 20 April); Antonio López de Santa Anna (starting 20 April)
1854	El Salvador	Francisco Dueñas (until 1 February); Vicente Gómez (1–15 February); José María San Martín (15 February – 26 September; starting 13 November); José Mariano Hernández (26 September – 13 November)
1858	El Salvador	Rafael Campo (until 1 February); Lorenzo Zepeda (1–7 February); Miguel Santín del Castillo (7 February – 24 June; starting 16 September); Gerardo Barrios (24 June – 16 September)
1859	El Salvador	Miguel Santín del Castillo (until 19 January); Joaquín Eufrasio Guzmán (19 January – 15 February); José María Peralta (15 February – 12 March); Gerardo Barrios (starting 12 March)
1872	Peru	José Balta (until 22 July); Tomás Gutiérrez (22–26 July); Mariano Herencia Zevallos (26 July – 2 August); Manuel Pardo y Lavalle (starting 2 August)
1876	Mexico	Sebastián Lerdo de Tejada (until 31 October); José María Iglesias (31 October – 28 November); Porfirio Díaz (28 November – 6 December); Juan N. Méndez (starting 6 December)
1885	El Salvador	Rafael Zaldívar (until 14 May); Fernando Figueroa (14 May – 18 June); José Rosales (18–22 June); Francisco Menéndez (starting 22 June)
1893	Nicaragua	Roberto Sacasa (until 11 July); Salvador Machado (1 June – 16 July); Joaquín Zavala (16–25 July); José Santos Zelaya (starting 25 July)
1910	Nicaragua	José Madriz (until 20 August); José Dolores Estrada (20–27 August); Luis Mena (27–30 August); Juan José Estrada (starting 30 August)
1919	Honduras	Francisco Bertrand (until 9 September); Salvador Aguirre (9–16 September); Vicente Mejía Colindres (16 September – 5 October); Francisco Bográn (starting 5 October)
1924	Honduras	Rafael López Gutiérrez (until 10 March); Francisco Bueso (10 March – 27 April); Tiburcio Carías Andino (27–30 April); Vicente Tosta (starting 30 April)
1926	Nicaragua	Carlos José Solórzano (until 14 March); Emiliano Chamorro Vargas (14 March – 11 November); Sebastián Uriza (30 October – 11 November); Adolfo Díaz (starting 14 November)
1943	Syria	Taj al-Din al-Hasani (until 17 January); Jamil al-Ulshi (17 January – 25 March); Ata Bey al-Ayyubi (25 March – 17 August); Shukri al-Quwatli (starting 17 March)
1947	Nicaragua	Anastasio Somoza García (until 1 May); Leonardo Argüello Barreto (1–27 May); Benjamín Lacayo Sacasa (27 May – 15 August); Víctor Manuel Román y Reyes (starting 15 August)
1961	Brazil	Juscelino Kubitschek (until 31 January); Jânio Quadros (31 January – 25 August); Pascoal Ranieri Mazzilli (25 August – 7 September); João Goulart (starting 7 September)
1965	(Benin) Dahomey	Sourou-Migan Apithy (until 27 November); Justin Ahomadégbé-Tomêtin (27–29 November); Tahirou Congacou (29 November – 22 December); Christophe Soglo (starting 22 December)
1973	Argentina	Alejandro Agustín Lanusse (until 25 May); Héctor José Cámpora (25 May – 13 July); Raúl Alberto Lastiri (13 July – 12 October); Juan Perón (starting 12 October)
1978	Bolivia	Hugo Banzer (until 21 July); Víctor González Fuentes (21 July); Juan Pereda (21 July – 24 November); David Padilla (starting 24 November)
1993	Burundi	Pierre Buyoya (until 10 July); Melchior Ndadaye (10 July – 21 October); François Ngeze (21–27 October); Sylvie Kinigi (starting 27 October)
2009	Gabon	Omar Bongo (until 8 June); Didjob Divungi Di Ndinge (6 May – 10 June); Rose Francine Rogombé (10 June – 16 October); Ali Bongo (starting 16 October)
2012	Somalia	Sharif Sheikh Ahmed (until 20 August); Muse Hassan Sheikh Sayid Abdulle (20–28 August); Mohamed Osman Jawari (28 August – 16 September); Hassan Sheikh Mohamud (starting 16 September)

=== Years of five presidents ===
Year	Country	Presidents
1855	Mexico	Antonio López de Santa Anna (until 5 August); Martín Carrera (5 August – 12 September); Rómulo Díaz de la Vega (12 September – 3 October); Juan Álvarez (4 October – 11 December); Ignacio Comonfort (starting 11 December)
1876	Honduras	Ponciano Leiva (until 8 June); Marcelino Mejía (8–13 June); Crescencio Gómez (13 June–12 August); José María Medina (12–27 August); Marco Aurelio Soto (starting 27 August)
1926	China	Duan Qirui (until 20 April); Hu Weide (20 April – 13 May); Yan Huiqing (13 May – 22 June); Du Xigui (22 June – 1 October); Wellington Koo (starting 1 October)
1931	Peru	Luis Miguel Sánchez Cerro (until 1 March; starting 8 December); Mariano Holguín (1 March); Ricardo Leoncio Elías Arias (1–5 March); Gustavo Jiménez (5–11 March); David Samanez Ocampo (11 March – 8 December)
1960	South Korea	Rhee Syng-man (until 27 April); Ho Chong (27 April 1960 – 16 June: 22 June – 8 August); Kwak Sang-hoon (16–22 June); Baek Nak-jun (8–12 August); Yun Po-sun (starting 13 August)
2025	South Korea	Yoon Suk Yeol (until 4 April); Choi Sang-mok (until 24 March); Han Duck-soo (24 March – 1 May); Lee Ju-ho (2 May – 4 June); Lee Jae Myung (starting 4 June)

=== Years of six presidents ===
Year	Country	Presidents
1838	Peru–Bolivia	Andrés de Santa Cruz (throughout); Luis José de Orbegoso (in the North, until 21 August); Agustín Gamarra (in Lima, starting 24 August); José de la Riva Agüero (in the North, starting 11 August); Ramón Herrera y Rodado (in the South, until 12 October); Pío de Tristán (in the South, starting 12 October)
1844	Peru	Manuel Ignacio de Vivanco (until 22 July); Domingo Nieto (in the South, until 17 February); Ramón Castilla (in the South, 17 February – 11 December); Domingo Elias (17 June – 10 August); Justo Figuerola (10 August – 7 October); Manuel Menéndez (starting 7 October)

=== Years of seven presidents ===
Year	Country	Presidents
1839	Honduras	Juan Francisco de Molina (11 January – 13 April); Felipe Neri Medina (13–15 April); Juan José Alvarado (15–27 April); José María Guerrero de Arcos (27 April – 10 August); Mariano Garrigó (10–20 August); José María Bustillo (20–27 August); From 27 August to 21 September, Honduras was governed by the Council of Ministers.; Francisco Zelaya y Ayes (starting 21 September)

== See also ==
- Year of the Three Emperors
- Year of the Three Kings
- Year of three popes
- Year of three prime ministers
- Triumvirate
