= Coatepeque =

Coatepeque may refer to:

- Coatepeque, Santa Ana, El Salvador
- Coatepeque Caldera, El Salvador
- Coatepeque, Quetzaltenango, Guatemala
