= Estanislao Pérez =

Salvadoran general

General Estanislao Pérez
- Born: Estanislao Pérez Arévalo; 9 November 1834; Santa Ana, Federal Republic of Central America
- Died: 26 March 1903 (aged 68) El Salvador
- Allegiance: El Salvador
- Branch: Salvadoran Army
- Service years: 1850–?
- Rank: General
- Conflicts: Filibuster War; War of 1863; Battle of Coatepeque; Siege of San Salvador; Honduran–Salvadoran War; Menéndez's revolution

Estanislao Pérez Arévalo (9 November 1834 – 26 March 1903) was a Salvadoran military officer and politician.

== Biography ==
Estanislao Pérez Arévalo was born and baptized on 9 November 1834 in Santa Ana, El Salvador, Federal Republic of Central America. His parents were Francisco Pérez and Francisca Arévalo. He traveled to Guatemala as a servant to Carlos Aragón in 1842 and studied there. He abandoned Aragón and returned to El Salvador where he was conscripted by the military commander of Jutiapa as a drummer. He eventually returned to Santa Ana and enrolled in a primary school.

Pérez enlisted in the Salvadoran Army in December 1850. He fought during the Filibuster War against William Walker with the rank of sergeant in 1857. During the war, he was promoted to brigade sergeant and sub-lieutenant. In 1861, he was promoted to captain and he was stationed near the Guatemalan border. There, he intercepted communications between Guatemalan president Rafael Carrera and San Salvador bishop Tomás Miguel Pineda y Saldaña. During the War of 1863, Pérez was tasked with scaring off Carrera in Chalchuapa before the Battle of Coatepeque. Pérez's 50 soldiers shot at Carrera but he was uninjured. Pérez commanded El Salvador's cavalry during the battle itself. For Pérez's service, President Gerardo Barrios promoted him to lieutenant colonel. He was promoted to colonel during the Siege of San Salvador.

Sometime during Marshal Santiago González's presidency in the early 1870s, Pérez was promoted to brigadier general for his service during the Honduran–Salvadoran War of 1871. He was promoted to divisional general on 26 April 1876. Pérez participated in the revolution that overthrew President Rafael Zaldívar and installed Divisional General Francisco Menéndez as president. Pérez's nephew was killed during the revolution in Armenia.

Pérez was a vice presidential candidate in the 1895 presidential election. He won the Santa Ana Department and less than 4,000 votes but lost to Prudencio Alfaro. Pérez died on 25 March 1903 at 2 a.m.
