= 1846 Salvadoran presidential election =

- 16 February 1846
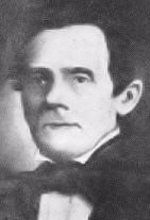
Candidate	Eugenio Aguilar
Party	Liberal
President before election
Fermín Palacios
Independent
Elected President
Eugenio Aguilar
Liberal

Presidential elections were held in El Salvador on 16 February 1846. Eugenio Aguilar ran unopposed and was elected by the legislature. His term began on 21 February 1846.

== Results ==
Candidate	Party
Eugenio Aguilar	Liberal
Total
Source: University of California, San Diego

== See also ==
- 1846 Salvadoran coup attempt
