= Nicaraguan-Salvadoran War =

1863 military conflict in Nicaragua

- Part of War of 1863
Date	April–June 1863
Location	Nicaragua
Result	Nicaraguan victory

Combatants
Nicaragua	El Salvador; Honduras

Commanders and leaders
(Nicaragua) Tomás Martínez	(El Salvador) Gerardo Barrios (El Salvador) Maximo Jerez (Honduras) José Francisco Montes

The Nicaraguan-Salvadoran War was a military conflict between El Salvador supported by Honduras, against Nicaragua, sparked by the Nicaraguan alliance with Guatemala, a country which was at the time at war with El Salvador.

== Background ==
Victorious in Coatepeque and with support from Honduras, General Gerardo Barrios declared war on Nicaragua due to President Tomás Martínez's backing of Guatemalan President Rafael Carrera in a previous invasion. Barrios instructed Máximo Jerez to invade Nicaragua in April. Although Salvadorans defeated Martinez's troops at San Jacinto on April 28, they were repelled by the Nicaraguans near León on April 29.

Barrios' plan to seize the port of Corinto by sea failed, while Nicaraguans managed to capture Amapala. In this situation, the President of El Salvador learned that General Carrera was mobilizing troops towards El Salvador once again.
