= January 1876 Salvadoran presidential election =

- January 1876
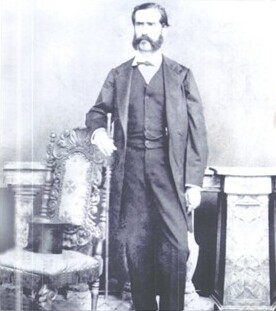
Candidate	Andrés del Valle
Party	Liberal
President before election
Santiago González
Liberal
Elected President
Andrés del Valle
Liberal

Presidential elections were held in El Salvador in January 1876. Andrés del Valle ran unopposed and was elected by the legislature.

== Results ==
Candidate	Party
Andrés del Valle	Liberal
Total
Source: University of California, San Diego
