= 1876 Salvadoran presidential election =

1876 Salvadoran presidential election may refer to one of two elections which occurred in El Salvador in 1876:

- January 1876 Salvadoran presidential election
- June 1876 Salvadoran presidential election
