= Three Emperors =

Three Emperors may refer to:

- League of the Three Emperors, an alliance between Germany, Russia and Austria-Hungary, from 1873 to 1887.
- Year of the Three Emperors, the year of 1888 where the German Empire had three different emperors.
- Three Kingdoms, a period in Chinese history, when China was split between three empires
- Three Sovereigns and Five Emperors, mythical or legendary rulers of China in remote antiquity
