= Juan José Guzmán =

President of El Salvador from 1842 to 1844

General Juan José Guzmán
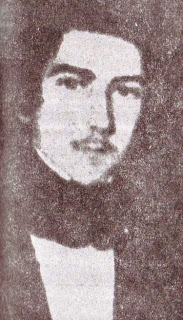

2nd President of El Salvador
- In office 8 March 1843 – 1 February 1844
- Vice President: Pedro José Arce
- Preceded by: Juan Lindo
- Succeeded by: Francisco Malespín
- In office 26 September 1842 – 26 January 1843; Acting President
- Preceded by: José Escolástico Marín (acting)
- Succeeded by: Pedro José Arce (acting)
- In office 13 April 1842 – 30 June 1842; Acting President
- Preceded by: José Escolástico Marín (acting)
- Succeeded by: Dionisio Villacorta (acting)

Personal details
- Born: July 1797 San Carlos, San Salvador, New Spain
- Died: 19 October 1847 (aged 50) San Vicente, El Salvador
- Party: Conservative
- Spouse: Rita Guzmán Cisneros (m. 1830)
- Education: University of San Carlos
- Occupation: Politician, military officer, lawyer

Military service
- Allegiance: Spanish Empire; Central America; El Salvador
- Branch/service: Spanish Army; Central American Army; Salvadoran Army
- Years of service: 1810s–1844
- Rank: General
- Battles/wars: Mexican annexation of El Salvador; 1st Central American Civil War; Battle of Mixco; Battle of Las Charcas; Anastasio Aquino's rebellion

Juan José Guzmán (July 1797 – 19 October 1847) was a Salvadoran politician and military officer who served as the 2nd president of El Salvador from 1842 to 1844.

== Early life ==
Juan José Guzmán was born in July 1797 in San Carlos (modern-day La Unión), San Salvador, New Spain. Guzmán's parents enrolled him in a school in San Vicente and he later attended the University of San Carlos in Guatemala City.

Guzmán began his military career as a cadet in the Bandera del Fijo Battalion of the Spanish Army. After Central America declared its independence from the Spanish Empire in 1821, Guzmán returned to El Salvador. There, he fought against the First Mexican Empire as it attempted to annex Central America. During the war, he attainted the rank of lieutenant. After the war, Guzmán returned to the University of San Carlos and completed his doctorate of civil law. He became a lawyer on 22 March 1826.

Although, Guzmán aligned with the conservatives of the Federal Republic of Central America, he fought under liberal Francisco Morazán during the First Central American Civil War and commanded units during the battles of Mixco and Las Charcas. During the war, he was promoted to colonel. In February 1829, Guzmán became a justice of the Supreme Court of Justice of Central America. He was re-elected on 15 May 1832 but he resigned from the court a few months later.

In October 1832, Guzmán became the governor of the San Vicente Department. He was overthrown during Anastasio Aquino's rebellion in 1833 and fled to the San Miguel Department and later Guatemala. He returned to El Salvador and served as a deputy of the Legislative Assembly of El Salvador from 1835 to March 1836. After that, he moved to Costa Rica where he lived for two years. In 1838, he returned to El Salvador and became the governor of the San Miguel Department. He was a member of the Constituent Assembly from 1840 to 1841.

By the age of 45 (1841 or 1842), Guzmán attained the rank of general.

== Presidency ==
Guzmán was inaugurated as the 2nd president of El Salvador on 13 April 1842. He temporarily handed power to Dionisio Villacorta on 30 June but resumed his functions on 26 September when acting president General José Escolástico Marín returned the office to him. During this term, Guzmán granted political asylum to Morazán's former followers. Guzmán again delegated the presidency to Marín on 26 January 1843 due to illness, resuming his seat on 8 March. Guzmán's mandate ended on 1 February 1844, when he handed the presidency to Fermín Palacios and retired from public life.

== Personal life ==
Guzmán married Rita Guzmán Cisneros in 1830 in San Carlos.

Guzmán died in San Vicente on 19 October 1847.

Political offices
Preceded by José Escolástico Marín (acting)	President of El Salvador; 1842	Succeeded by Dionisio Villacorta (acting)
Preceded by José Escolástico Marín (acting)	President of El Salvador; 1842–1843	Succeeded by Pedro José Arce (acting)
Preceded by Pedro José Arce (acting)	President of El Salvador; 1843–1844	Succeeded by Fermín Palacios (acting)
