= Eugenio Aguilar =

President of El Salvador from 1846 to 1848

Doctor Eugenio Aguilar
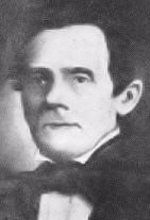

4th President of El Salvador
- In office 21 February 1846 – 1 February 1848
- Vice President: José Campo y Pomar
- Preceded by: Fermín Palacios (acting)
- Succeeded by: Tomás Medina (acting)

9th President of the Legislative Assembly of El Salvador
- In office 3 February 1849 – 22 March 1849
- Preceded by: José María Zelaya Pérez
- Succeeded by: Agustín Morales

Personal details
- Born: Eugenio Aguilar González; 15 November 1804 Santiago Nonualco, New Spain
- Died: 23 April 1879 (aged 74) San Salvador, El Salvador
- Party: Liberal
- Spouse: Dolores Padilla y Castillo (m. 1838)
- Occupation: Politician, diplomat, priest

Eugenio Aguilar González (15 November 1804 – 23 April 1879) was a Salvadoran politician who served as the 4th president of El Salvador from 1846 to 1848. He also served as the mayor of San Salvador in 1839 and 1864, and the president of the Legislative Assembly in 1849.

== Early life ==
Eugenio Aguilar González was born on 15 November 1804 in Santiago Nonualco, then a part of the Spanish colony of New Spain. His father was José Antonio Aguilar and his mother was Juana de González y Batres. Aguilar's father died before his birth. He was orphaned in 1812 and moved to San Salvador, the capital of the Intendancy of San Salvador, where he came under the care of three of his paternal uncles, all of whom were priests. In 1818, he traveled to Guatemala City to study philosophy at the Tridentine College and Seminary of Our Lady of the Assumption. IN 1838, he completed his doctorate of medicine at the Pontifical University. Aguilar married Dolores Padilla y Castillo on 8 April 1838.

== Political career ==
In 1839, Aguilar served as the mayor of San Salvador, the capital city of El Salvador. From 1840 to 1844, he was the surgeon major of the Salvadoran Army and the San Salvador military hospital. In 1844, he became the rector of the University of El Salvador. He also served as a Salvadoran diplomat to Guatemala, Honduras, and Nicaragua on several occasions during the 1840s and 1850s.

On 16 February 1846, Aguilar was elected as president of El Salvador by the Legislative Assembly; he won unopposed. He assumed office on 21 February, succeeding acting President Fermín Palacios.

During a coup attempt by the Salvadoran military supported by San Salvador archbishop Jorge de Viteri y Ungo, Aguilar ceded presidential powers to Palacios on 12 July. Aguilar regained his presidential powers in a counter coup on 21 July with the support of the municipal government of San Salvador. Viteri fled the country to Honduras and Aguilar formally expelled Viteri from the country on 29 July, describing him as a traitor; Viteri accused Aguilar of being irreligious.

Aguilar left office on 1 February 1848 and ceded power to senator Tomás Medina who served in an acting capacity until Doroteo Vasconcelos was inaugurated on 7 February. Aguilar served as the president of the Legislative Assembly from 3 February 1849 to 22 March 1849. He served in several ministerial positions, including minister of the interior and external relations (1851); minister of dispatch (1856–1857); and minister of finance and war (1856 and 1861–1863). Although serving as President Gerardo Barrios' minister of finance and war, Aguilar fled El Salvador in 1863 fearing repression from Barrios' government and supported Barrios' overthrow by Francisco Dueñas later that year. Aguilar served a second term as mayor of San Salvador in 1864.

== Later life and death ==
Aguilar retired from politics in 1867 and attended the Tridentine College and Seminary of Santa Tecla to become a priest. He was ordained by Nicaraguan bishop Manuel de Ulloa on 18 December 1870. He gave his first sermon as a priest on 10 January 1871. He became a professor medicine in 1876.

Aguilar died in San Salvador on 23 April 1879. He was buried at the Iglesia del Rosario.

Political offices
Preceded by Fermín Palacios (acting)	President of El Salvador; 1846–1848	Succeeded by Tomás Medina (acting)
Preceded by José María Zelaya Pérez	President of the Legislative Assembly; 1849	Succeeded by Agustín Morales
