= Year of three prime ministers =

Several years have been referred to as the Year of three prime ministers or Year of the three prime ministers. This list does not represent all times that a country has had three prime ministers in a single year.

1868 in the United Kingdom
Edward Smith-Stanley, 14th Earl of Derby, resigned in February; Benjamin Disraeli took the helm of the Conservative Party and served as Prime Minister through December, when he lost a general election to the Liberal Party, being succeeded by its leader, William Ewart Gladstone.
1941 in Australia
Robert Menzies of the United Australia Party resigned in August and was replaced as leader of the governing coalition by the Country Party's Arthur Fadden; Fadden lost a motion of no confidence after 39 days, and John Curtin became prime minister 4 days later.
1999 in Russia
(Note: Referred to in Namedni-1999, as Год трёх премьеров (God trjoh prem'erov), translated in the library catalogue of the UCL School of Slavonic and East European Studies as "the year of three Prime Ministers".) In May, President Boris Yeltsin compelled Yevgeny Primakov, his own appointee, to resign. Yeltsin then compelled the resignation of Primakov's successor, Sergei Stepashin, in August, replacing him with Vladimir Putin.
2013 in Australia
Julia Gillard lost a leadership spill to fellow Labor member Kevin Rudd in June 2013. In the September federal election, Tony Abbott of the Liberal Party defeated Rudd.
2016 in Croatia
The year began amidst negotiations following the 2015 parliamentary election. The negotiations concluded in January, with non-partisan Tihomir Orešković replacing incumbent Zoran Milanović, a Social Democratic Party member. Orešković lost a vote of no confidence in June, and after elections in September was succeeded by Andrej Plenković of the Croatian Democratic Union.
2022 in the United Kingdom
Boris Johnson announced his resignation in July amidst a government crisis, and was replaced by fellow Conservative Liz Truss in September after a party election; Truss resigned in October amidst another government crisis; Rishi Sunak won the subsequent party election unopposed.
2022 in Israel
Prime minister Naftali Bennett ended his term with the dissolution of the Knesset and a snap election called, with Yair Lapid becoming interim prime minister on 1 July. After the 2022 election, Benjamin Netanyahu became prime minister again on 29 December.

== See also ==
- Year of the Three Emperors (German Empire, 1888)
- Year of the Three Kings (several years)
- Year of three presidents (many years)
- Year of three popes (thirteen years, plus one year of four popes)
- Year of the Four Emperors (Roman Empire, 69)
- Year of the Five Emperors (Roman Empire, 193)
- Year of the Six Emperors (Roman Empire, 238)
