= Pedro José Arce =

Salvadoran politician (1801–1871)

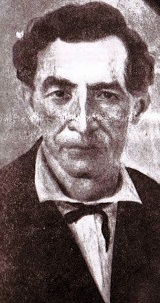

President of El Salvador
- In office 26 January 1843 – 8 March 1843; Acting President
- Preceded by: Juan José Guzmán
- Succeeded by: Juan José Guzmán
- In office 20 June 1841 – 28 June 1841; Acting President
- Preceded by: Juan Lindo
- Succeeded by: Juan Lindo

Vice President of El Salvador
- In office 12 April 1842 – 31 January 1844
- President: Juan José Guzmán; Dionisio Villacorta; José Escolástico Marín; Juan José Guzmán; Himself; Juan José Guzmán
- Preceded by: Himself
- Succeeded by: Luis Ayala
- In office 7 January 1841 – 1 February 1842
- President: Juan Lindo; Himself; Juan Lindo
- Preceded by: José María Silva
- Succeeded by: Himself

Personal details
- Born: 28 August 1801 San Salvador
- Died: 3 April 1871 (aged 69)
- Party: Independent

Pedro José Arce y Fagoaga (28 August 1801 – 3 April 1871) was a Salvadoran politician. He was the Vice President of El Salvador from 1842 to 1844 and also twice served as Acting President of El Salvador.

== Biography ==
Arce was born on 28 August 1801 in San Salvador, being baptized that day while receiving the baptismal name Pedro José Agustín. His father, Bernardo de Arce y León, was a Salvadoran patriot, while his brother was statesman Manuel José Arce. He was also the nephew of independence activist José Matías Delgado. He was educated in Guatemala and then worked for his parents' agricultural property when he came back to El Salvador. Freddy and María Leistenschneider, in the book Governors of El Salvador: Biographies, noted that Arce, "professed republican ideals, and with great enthusiasm, together with his family, he worked for the Independence of Central America, enduring all kinds of persecution".

Arce served in the Army with the rank of captain. He became Governor of Sonsonate in 1833 and held the title at various points in the subsequent years. Arce briefly was handed the role of Acting President of El Salvador by Juan Lindo on 20 June 1841, then eight days later returned the post to Lindo. He was elected Vice President of El Salvador in 1842 and remained in the position until 1844. On 26 January 1843, while he was serving as Vice President, the President, Juan José Guzmán, became seriously ill. He assigned Arce to serve as Acting President again in his absence. Arce thus served in the role for a second time, from 26 January 1843 until 8 March 1843, when José Guzmán recovered.

Arce remained active in politics in later years, attending the Legislative Congress in 1855 as a representative of the District of Isaico. He was appointed Revenue Administrator of Sonsonate and Santa Ana in 1860. According to Freddy and María Leistenschneider, "Don Pedro Arce y Fagoaga, burdened by years and weary, and after having served El Salvador, died on April 3, 1871". He was age 69 at the time of his death.
