= Year of the Three Kings =

Several years have been referred to as the Year of the Three Kings or Year of Three Kings. This list does not include all years in which a country has had three kings or three claimants to the throne.

1016 in England
Æthelred the Unready died in April, leaving the throne to his son Edmund Ironside, who reigned only until November, when he died and was succeeded by Cnut the Great.
1066 in England
Upon the death of Edward the Confessor in January, Harold Godwinson (Earl of Wessex), William the Conqueror (Duke of Normandy), and Harald Hardrada (King of Norway) all claimed the title of King of England. Harold defeated Hardrada at the Battle of Stamford Bridge, leaving him to face William at the Battle of Hastings. William defeated Harold's forces (killing him in the process) and became king.
1316 in France
Louis X died in June, leaving the throne to his posthumous son, John I. Born on 15 November, John's uncle Philip, Count of Poitiers, served as his regent. The infant king died only four days later, marking the end of more than three centuries of stable father-to-son succession to the French throne. Philip succeeded John as Philip V.
1483 in England
Edward IV died in April. His son Edward V, reigned until June, when his uncle and Lord Protector, Richard, Duke of Gloucester deposed him and assumed the throne as Richard III.
1888 and 1889 in Buganda (Note: While only two kings reigned in 1889, historian Sir John Milner Gray uses "Year of Three Kings" to refer to the full time period between Mwanga II's deposition and restoration to power.)
Mwanga II fled in September 1888 after his chiefs sought to replace him with his brother, Kiweewa. Six weeks later, Muslim chiefs captured Kiweewa and replaced him with their initial pick to be kabaka, Kalema. In 1889, Mwanga retook the throne from Kiweewa.
1936 in the United Kingdom
After the death of George V in January, his son Edward VIII became king, only to abdicate in December amidst a constitutional crisis. Edward's younger brother, Prince Albert, Duke of York, acceded to the throne as George VI. Edward, now Prince Edward, Duke of Windsor, lived in exile until his death in 1972.
1960 in Malaya
Tuanku Abdul Rahman died on 1 April 1960. The Conference of Rulers later elected Sultan Hisamuddin Alam Shah to be next Yang di-Pertuan Agong. He was proclaimed on 14 April 1960, but later died on his designated installation day on 1 September 1960. The Conference of Rulers next elected Tuanku Syed Putra to be the next Yang di-Pertuan Agong, proclaimed on 21 September 1960. He later became the first Yang di-Pertuan Agong of Malaysia after its formation.
2001 in Nepal
Upon the assassination of King Birendra in the Nepalese royal massacre, Crown Prince Dipendra, the perpetrator, was named king despite being comatose after shooting himself. Dipendra's uncle Gyanendra served as regent until the former’s death three days later. Gyanendra then became king and was later deposed by the abolition of the monarchy in 2008.

== See also ==
- Year of the Three Emperors (German Empire, 1888)
- Year of the Three Popes (twelve years, plus one Year of the Four Popes)
- Year of three presidents (several years, plus several years of four presidents)
- Year of three prime ministers (several years)
- Year of the Four Emperors (Roman Empire, 69)
- Year of the Five Emperors (Roman Empire, 193)
- Year of the Six Emperors (Roman Empire, 238)
- List of shortest-reigning monarchs, other kings who reigned for only part of a calendar year
- 1553 in England, in which there were three monarchs, but only one king (Edward VI). When Edward died, he named Lady Jane Grey his successor, but she was queen for only nine days before she was deposed by Mary I.
