= Nicolás García Jerez =

Nicolás García Jerez O.P.
- Bishop of Nicaragua
- Church: Catholic Church
- Diocese: Diocese of Nicaragua
- In office: 17 November 1806 – 31 July 1825
- Predecessor: Felipe Antonio Pérez del Notario
- Successor: Jorge de Viteri y Ungo

Orders
- Consecration: 1 April 1810

Personal details
- Born: 28 January 1757 Murcia, Kingdom of Murcia, Crown of Castile
- Died: 31 July 1825 (aged 68) Nicaragua, Federal Republic of Central America

Nicolás García Jerez (28 January 1757 – 31 July 1825) was a Spanish bishop, who also served as a governor of Nicaragua, and played an important role in Nicaraguan independence.

He was appointed Bishop of Nicaragua in 1806, ordained in 1810, and held the position until his death in 1825.

== Role in Nicaraguan independence ==
When independence movements began in Latin America, the Nicaraguan church was divided over political issues. The high ranking churches supported Spanish rulers, while low level priests supported priests. García Jerez decided to negotiate with pro-independence figures and proposed elections for each barrios. The elections were supposed to clear the way for forming a junta. Most priests were under his control. However, in 1811, he declared himself the governor of Nicaragua and threatened to punish rebellion by death penalty, when the movement began to lose favor.

== See also ==
- History of Nicaragua

== External links and additional sources ==
- Cheney, David M. "Diocese of León en Nicaragua". Catholic-Hierarchy.org. (for Chronology of Bishops)^{self-published}
- Chow, Gabriel. "Diocese of León". GCatholic.org. (for Chronology of Bishops)^{self-published}
