= Year of three popes =

Year in which the Catholic Church elects two popes

Popes in 1978: Pope Paul VI, Pope John Paul I, and Pope John Paul II

A year of three popes is a year when the College of Cardinals of the Catholic Church (hence excepting Coptic popes) is required to elect two new popes within the same calendar year. The term is most often used in reference to 1978, the most recent year this has occurred. Such a year has historically occurred when a newly elected pope dies very early into his papacy, resulting in the Catholic Church being led by three different popes in the same calendar year. This has historically occurred a total of twelve times. In 1276, there was an instance of a year of four popes.

== Instances ==
There have been twelve instances in which exactly three popes have held office in a given calendar year.

- 827: Eugene II — Valentine — Gregory IV (Valentine had reigned only 41 days when he died.)
- 896: Formosus — Boniface VI — Stephen VI (After reigning for just fifteen days, Boniface VI is said by some to have died of gout or been forcibly ejected)
- 897: Stephen VI — Romanus — Theodore II (Pontificate of Romanus ended when he was deposed and confined to a monastery.)
- 964: Leo VIII — Benedict V — John XIII (Leo VIII was overthrown, then Benedict V himself was overthrown)
- 1003: Sylvester II — John XVII — John XVIII (John XVII died less than six months after taking office)
- 1045: Sylvester III (Note: Sylvester III and Gregory VI are sometimes considered antipopes.) — Benedict IX (second reign) — Gregory VI (Benedict IX gave up the papacy to his godfather after a month in exchange for money)
- 1187: Urban III — Gregory VIII — Clement III (Gregory VIII died of fever after 57 days in office)
- 1503: Alexander VI — Pius III — Julius II (Pius III died of a septic ulcer on his leg after 26 days in office)
- 1555: Julius III — Marcellus II — Paul IV (Marcellus II died of a stroke after 22 days in office)
- 1590: Sixtus V — Urban VII — Gregory XIV (Urban VII died of malaria after 12 days in office, making him the shortest reigning pope)
- 1605: Clement VIII — Leo XI — Paul V (Leo XI died of a fever after 27 days in office)
- 1978: Paul VI — John Paul I — John Paul II (John Paul I died, likely from a heart attack, after 33 days in office)

== Year of four popes ==
The Catholic Church also had a Year of four popes:

- 1276: Gregory X — Innocent V — Adrian V — John XXI (Innocent V died five months after election, then his successor Adrian V died after a month as pope)
Coat of arms of Pope Gregory X (1 September 1271 – 10 January 1276)

Coat of arms of Pope Innocent V (21 January 1276 – 22 June 1276)

Coat of arms of Pope Adrian V (11 July 1276 – 18 August 1276)

Coat of arms of Pope John XXI (8 September 1276 – 20 May 1277)

== See also ==
- List of popes by length of reign
- Western Schism, which from 1409 to 1414 saw three simultaneous claimants to the Papacy
- Year of the Three Kings
- Year of the Three Emperors
- Year of three presidents
- Year of three prime ministers
