= Juan Lindo =

Central American politician (1790–1857)

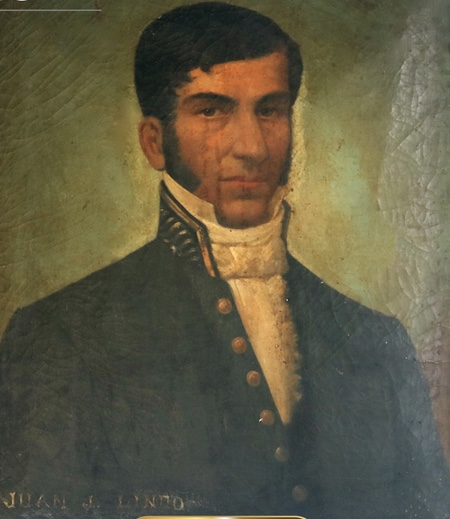

President of Honduras
- In office 2 February 1847 – 1 February 1852
- Vice President: Felipe Bustillo
- Preceded by: Coronado Chávez
- Succeeded by: Francisco Gómez y Argüelles (acting)

1st President of El Salvador
- In office 28 June 1841 – 1 February 1842
- Vice President: Pedro José Arce
- Preceded by: Pedro José Arce (acting)
- Succeeded by: Juan José Guzmán
- In office 30 January 1841 – 20 June 1841
- Preceded by: Himself (as Head of State)
- Succeeded by: Pedro José Arce (acting)

Head of State of El Salvador
- In office 7 January 1841 – 30 January 1841; Provisional head of State
- Preceded by: Antonio José Cañas
- Succeeded by: Himself (as President)

Personal details
- Born: Juan Nepomuceno Fernández Lindo y Zelaya; 16 May 1790 Tegucigalpa, New Spain
- Died: 23 April 1857 (aged 66) Gracias, Honduras
- Party: Conservative Party
- Occupation: Lawyer, politician

Juan Nepomuceno Fernández Lindo y Zelaya, generally known as Juan Lindo (16 May 1790 – 23 April 1857), was a conservative Central American politician who served as the 1st President of El Salvador from 1841 to 1842 and as the President of the Republic of Honduras from 1847 to 1852.

== Background ==
Lindo was born into a landholding family. He was the son of a Spanish Jew. There is some question about his birth and death dates. Some sources give 1790 for his birth and some give 1853 for his death. In 1814 he became a lawyer (licenciado en derecho) at the Universidad de San Carlos in Guatemala. After graduation, he worked for the Spanish regime. After the independence of Central America from Spain in 1821, he was intendente of the Province of Comayagua. He was one of the promoters of the annexation of Central America to the Mexican Empire of Agustín de Iturbide, which he favored over Guatemala.

He was elected deputy to the Legislative Assembly of Honduras in 1826. The following year he aided Conservative José Justo Milla in his defeat of Honduran Chief of State Dionisio de Herrera. He was a deputy to the constituent assembly that was convoked in June 1838, where he represented the Conservative Party. From his position in the assembly, he promoted the separation of Honduras from the Federal Republic of Central America in October 1838.

== As President of El Salvador ==
In 1840 he traveled to El Salvador, where with the help of General Francisco Malespín he became secretary of state, from October 1840 to January 1841. Afterwards he was elected provisional chief of state of the State of El Salvador, from 7 January to 22 February 1841, succeeding Colonel Antonio José Cañas Quintanilla. On 22 February 1841, the constituent assembly declared El Salvador a sovereign independent republic, and Lindo became the 1st President of the now-independent republic, serving until 1 February 1842.

Lindo named General and Licienciado Norberto Ramírez minister. On 16 February 1841 the constituent assembly issued the decree establishing the University of El Salvador. Lindo ordered the establishment of schools in every village and valley of the country with at least 150 inhabitants. He ordered the local authorities fined if they did not establish the schools and require attendance.

== As president of Honduras ==
In 1842 he returned to Honduras and established himself at Comayagua. After General Francisco Ferrera declined to serve as president, the Honduran assembly elected Lindo constitutional president, a position he exercised from 12 February 1847 to 4 February 1848. During his term he established the University of Honduras (Universidad Nacional Autónoma de Honduras) and promulgated a new constitution. In accordance with the new constitution, he was elected for a second term, which ended on 1 February 1852.

In his second administration in Honduras, General José Santos Guardiola, appointed by Lindo, revolted in Tegucigalpa against the National Assembly, with the intent of taking prisoner General Ferrera and Don Coronado Chávez, who were intriguing against Lindo. Felipe Bustillo, who had taken over government functions from Lindo, fled to Copán, and Lindo resumed the presidency. Ferrera and Chávez fled to El Salvador. Guardiola later revolted against Lindo, but was defeated and went into voluntary exile.

Lindo signed an alliance with Salvadoran president Doroteo Vasconcelos to declare war on the government of Guatemala, headed by Rafael Carrera. Allied troops invaded Guatemalan territory, but were defeated by Carrera in the Battle of La Arada on 2 February 1851.

At the end of Lindo's second term General José Trinidad Cabañas entered the presidency. Lindo retired from politics and established himself in the city of Gracias, department of Lempira, where he died in 1857.

Political offices
Preceded by Position established	President of El Salvador; 1841–1842	Succeeded by José Escolástico Marín
Preceded by Council of Ministers	President of Honduras; 1847–1852	Succeeded by Francisco Gómez
