= Dionisio Villacorta =

Salvadoran politician

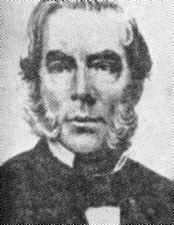

President of El Salvador
- In office 30 June 1842 – 19 July 1842; Acting President
- Preceded by: Juan José Guzmán
- Succeeded by: José Escolástico Marín

Personal details
- Born: Zacatecoluca, El Salvador
- Died: 11 November 1846

Dionisio Villacorta was the Acting President of the Republic of El Salvador from 30 June to 19 July 1842. He was born in Zacatecoluca. He handed over the presidency to General and lawyer José Escolástico Marín.
