= Battle of Coatepeque (1863) =

Central American battle in 1863

- Part of the War of 1863
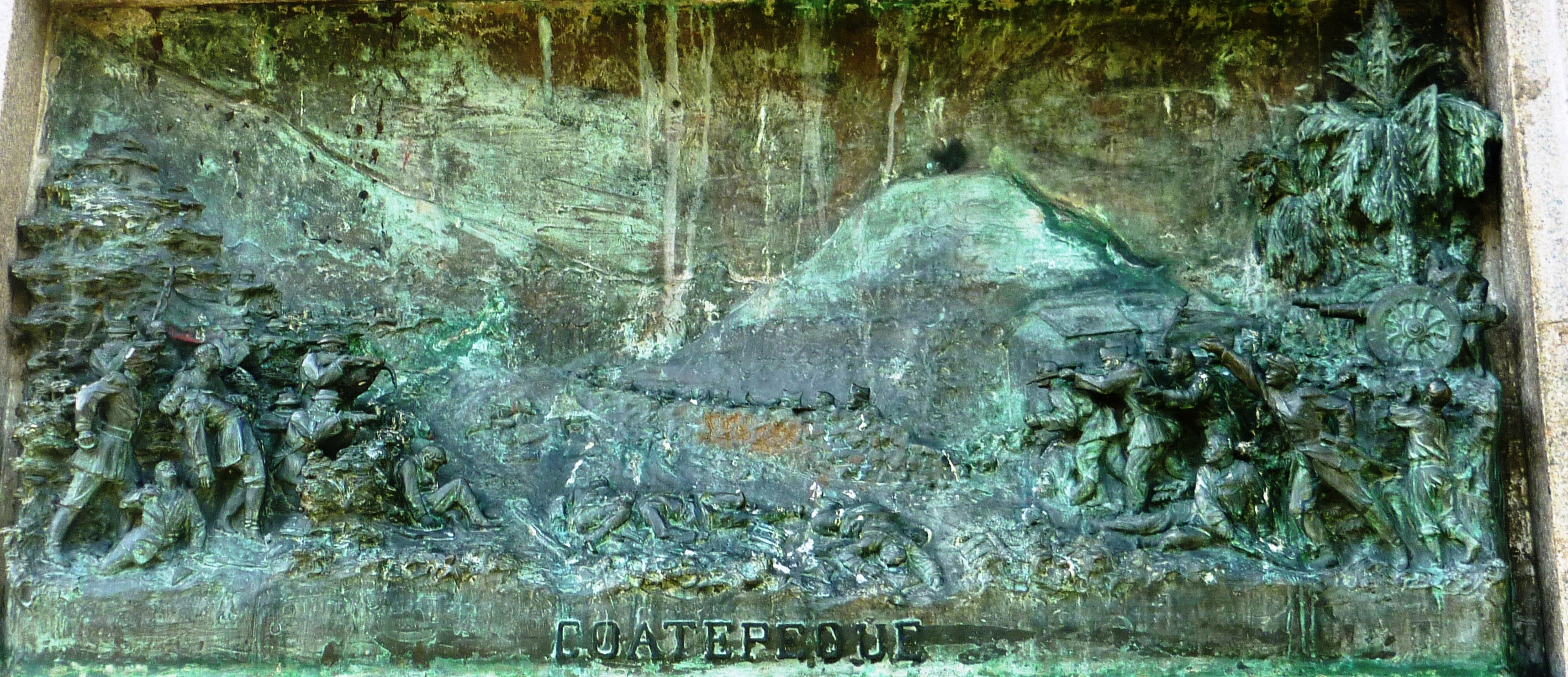
- Depiction of the battle at a memorial to Gerardo Barrios.
| Date | 22–24 February 1863 |
| Location | Coatepeque, Santa Ana, El Salvador |
| Result | Salvadoran victory |

Belligerents
| Guatemala | El Salvador; Honduras |

Commanders and leaders
| Rafael Carrera; José Víctor Zavala; Vicente Cerna; Serapio Cruz | Gerardo Barrios; José Cabañas; Santiago González; Rafael Osorio; Eusebio Bracamonte; Mariano Hernández; Pedro Escalón; Estanislao Pérez |

Strength
| 6,500 soldiers | 4,000 soldiers |

Casualties and losses
| 900+ dead 1,500 injured 9 artillery pieces lost >2,000 guns lost | Unknown |

The Battle of Coatepeque (Spanish: Batalla de Coatepeque) was fought between the forces of El Salvador and Guatemala from 22 to 24 February 1863.

== Background ==
In 1862, Guatemalan President Rafael Carrera revealed to his subordinates a plan to invade Salvadoran territory and overthrow Salvadoran President Gerardo Barrios, one of his rivals. The following year, 1863, Carrera invaded El Salvador and captured and devastated the local populations of Ahuachapán, Chalchuapa, and Santa Ana. On 13 February 1863, Barrios established his headquarters in the town of Jesús de los Milagros de Coatepeque anticipating that it would be Carrera's next target.

== Order of battle ==
=== Salvadorans ===
The Salvadoran Army under Gerardo Barrios consisted of 4,000 infantry soldiers. The army also consisted of an artillery corps and one cavalry corps. Most of the soldiers were stationed on the San Pedro Malakoff hill while the rest were divided between the El Congo hill and the town of Coatepeque where Gerardo Barrios himself would wait for Carrera with his soldiers. The main road to Santa Ana was fortified with barricades and wooden palisades. A trench with defensive positions was also built on a hill near the Santa Ana Volcano with 150 men stationed there. The position was very removed from the main defenses but its positioning was critical since if it was captured, Carrera could outflank the defenders and reach the village from behind.

The commanders of the Salvadoran Army were:

- Gerardo Barrios – General Commander
- José Trinidad Cabañas – Commander of the General Staff
- Tomás Santander – Head of the Barrios Personal Guard
- Domingo María Jehl – Vicar General
- Horacio Parker – Commander of the Artillery Brigade
- Alexandre Biscouby – Chief of the Artillery of San Pedro Malakoff
- Alexandre Bassel – Chief of the Artillery of El Congo
- Santiago González – Commander of the 1st Division
- Rafael Osorio – Commander of the 2nd Division
- Eusebio Bracamonte – Commander of the 3rd Division
- Mariano Hernández – Commander of the 4th Division
- Pedro Escalón – Commander of the 5th Division
- Manuel Estévez – Commander of the Santa Ana Volcano Defenses

=== Guatemalans ===
The Guatemalan Army was larger than the Salvadoran Army. It was composed of 6,500 infantry soldiers. The attacking Guatemalans were better equipped than the Salvadorans with better artillery and better rifles.

The commanders of the Guatemalan Army were:

- Rafael Carrera – General Commander
- Paul Brun – Commander of the Artillery
- José Víctor Zavala – Commander of the 1st Division
- Vicente Cerna Sandoval – Commander of the 2nd Division
- Serapio Cruz – Commander of the 3rd Division

== Battle ==
On 22 February, skirmishes began between the reconnaissance patrols of the two armies.

On 23 February, there were several Guatemalan attacks on the Salvadoran positions on the San Pedro Malakoff hill. The attacks were all repelled by Biscouby's forces. Carrera gave the order for these assaults to stop since the attacks made no progress. The Guatemalans then dedicated themselves to bombarding the primary defending positions. At night the attacking Guatemalan troops managed to surround the San Pedro Malakoff hill and took the Salvadorans by surprise, but the attack was also repelled

On 24 February, the Guatemalans attacked the two hills and the town itself with their entire army. While the Guatemalans were just about to capture a trench, a fire broke out and many soldiers fled. After the fire died down, the Guatemalans regrouped and attacked the town. The assault failed with Barrios himself defeating Carrera with his personal guard. After the attacks left hundreds dead, Carrera decided use his artillery to its maximum capacity, opening fire towards Coatepeque and the San Pedro Malakoff hill from a hill they occupied, however, the cannons did not do enough damage to the Salvadorans.

At around 1 in the afternoon, the Guatemalans attempted a last attack to dislodge the Salvadorans, but a company under the command of Estanislao Pérez defeated them. General Santiago González and his division left their positions and attacked the Guatemalans head-on and managed to push them back a little before being surrounded. González's soldiers broke through the encirclement and returned to their positions. Meanwhile, General Eusebio Bracamonte attacked the Guatemalan rear which caused a panic in Carrera's entire army who began to flee. Carrera, seeing his strength dissipate, gave up and retreated from the battle field at around 5 in the afternoon. Upon seeing the Guatemalans retreat, González pursued the Carrera with cavalry to Jutiapa in Guatemala. The battle ended in a decisive Salvadoran victory.

== Aftermath ==
Carrera was forced to withdraw and leave the cities of Santa Ana, Chalchuapa, and Ahuachapán as well as the other towns he had occupied. However, he again invaded El Salvador in June and directly besieged San Salvador and forced Gerardo Barrios to resign and flee the country on 26 October 1863.

== Bibliography ==
- Latin American Studies. "Bandera cubana filibustera" (PDF). Latin American Studies.
