= War of 1863 =

War in Central America

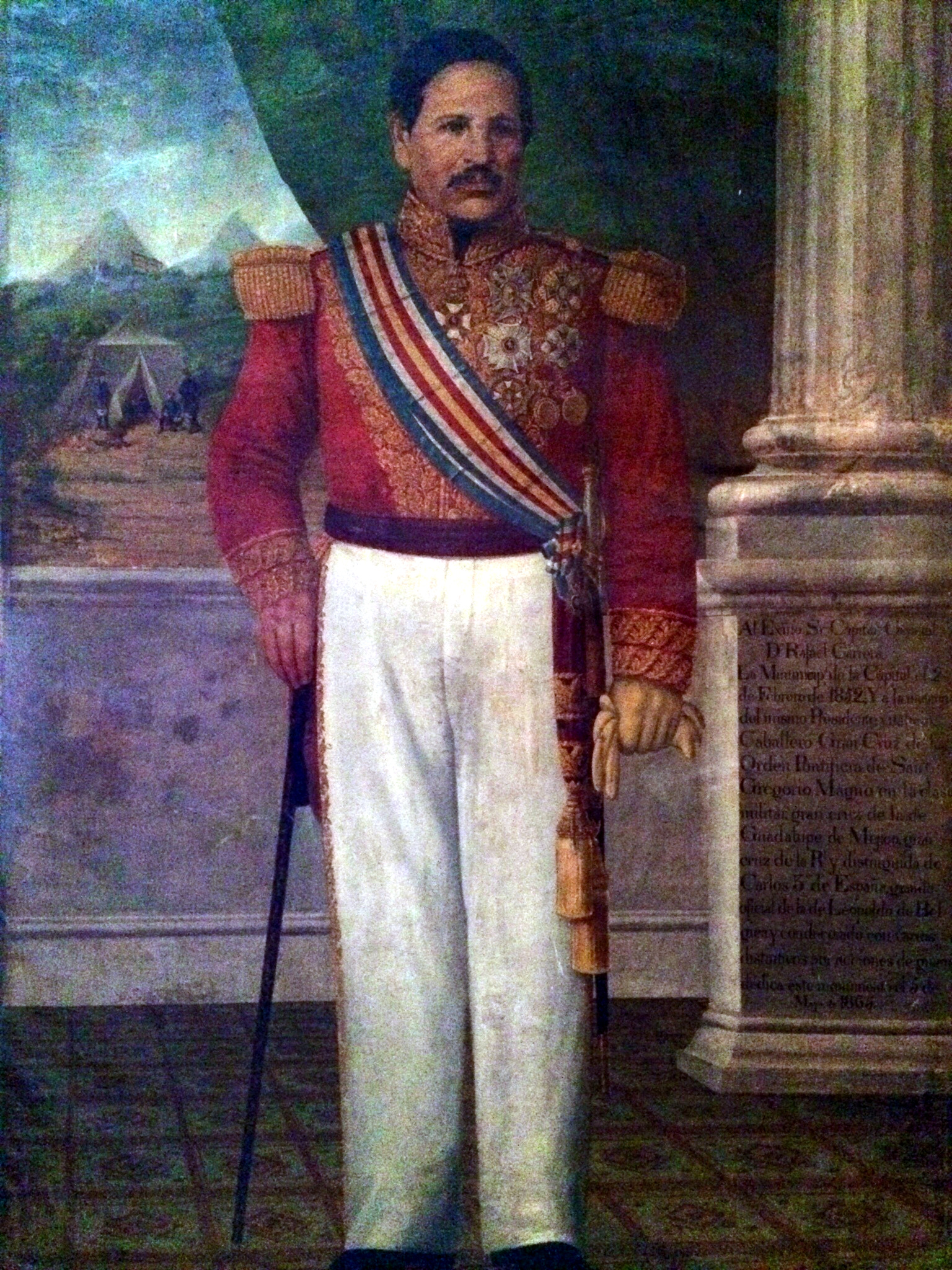
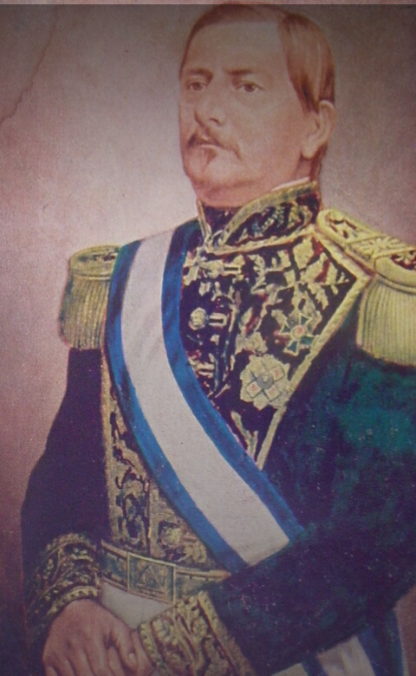
- Conservative leader President Rafael Carrera (left) and liberal leader General Gerardo Barrios (right)
Date	13 February – 26 October 1863 (8 months and 13 days)
Location	Guatemala and El Salvador
Result	Guatemalan victory: Overthrow of Gerardo Barrios

Belligerents
Guatemala; Salvadoran exiles; Supported by: Costa Rica; Nicaragua	El Salvador; Honduras

Commanders and leaders
Rafael Carrera; José Víctor Zavala; Vicente Cerna; Francisco Dueñas; Santiago González	Gerardo Barrios; Santiago González; Trinidad Cabañas

The War of 1863 (Spanish: Guerra de 1863) was a conflict fought between El Salvador and Guatemala from 13 February 1863 to 26 October 1863.

Guatemalan President Rafael Carrera sought to overthrow Salvadoran President Gerardo Barrios, citing his attacks on the Catholic Church in El Salvador during his presidency as justification. Barrios was overthrown on 26 October 1863 and was replaced by a conservative politician, Francisco Dueñas, ending the war.

== Background ==
On 12 March 1859, General Gerardo Barrios overthrew Salvadoran President José María Peralta and declared himself President of El Salvador. The coup and ascension of Barrios to power caused many conservative politicians to flee to Guatemala for safety.

=== Barrios–Carrera rivalry ===
Guatemalan president Rafael Carrera was a conservative politician while Barrios was a liberal politician and both ruled as dictators of their respective countries. Barrios passed anticlerical legislation in El Salvador to diminish the power and influence of the Catholic Church while Carrera made agreements with the Church to expand its influence and uphold its privileges.

Carrera initially supported Barrios believing that a strong ruler in El Salvador would be in his best interests, even visiting San Salvador from December 1860 to January 1861 to improve relations. However, in the following years, Barrios began attacking Carrera calling him a "savage" while Guatemalan newspapers attacked Barrios' "lameness and pomposity." The Guatemalans later labeled the war as a war over religion when it was really a political and ideological war. Salvadoran bishops did, however, support the Guatemalans in the conflict, as did Salvadoran conservatives.

== War ==
=== Battle of Coatepeque ===
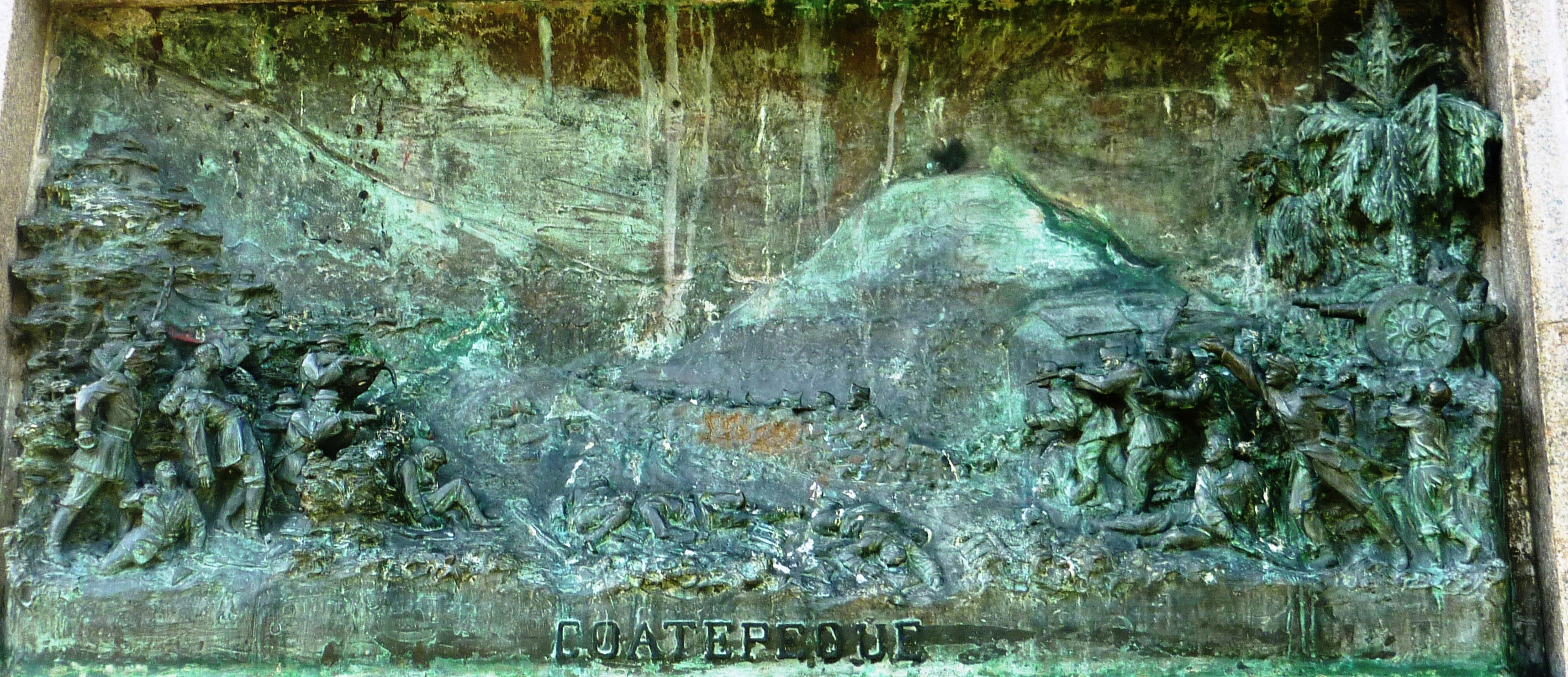
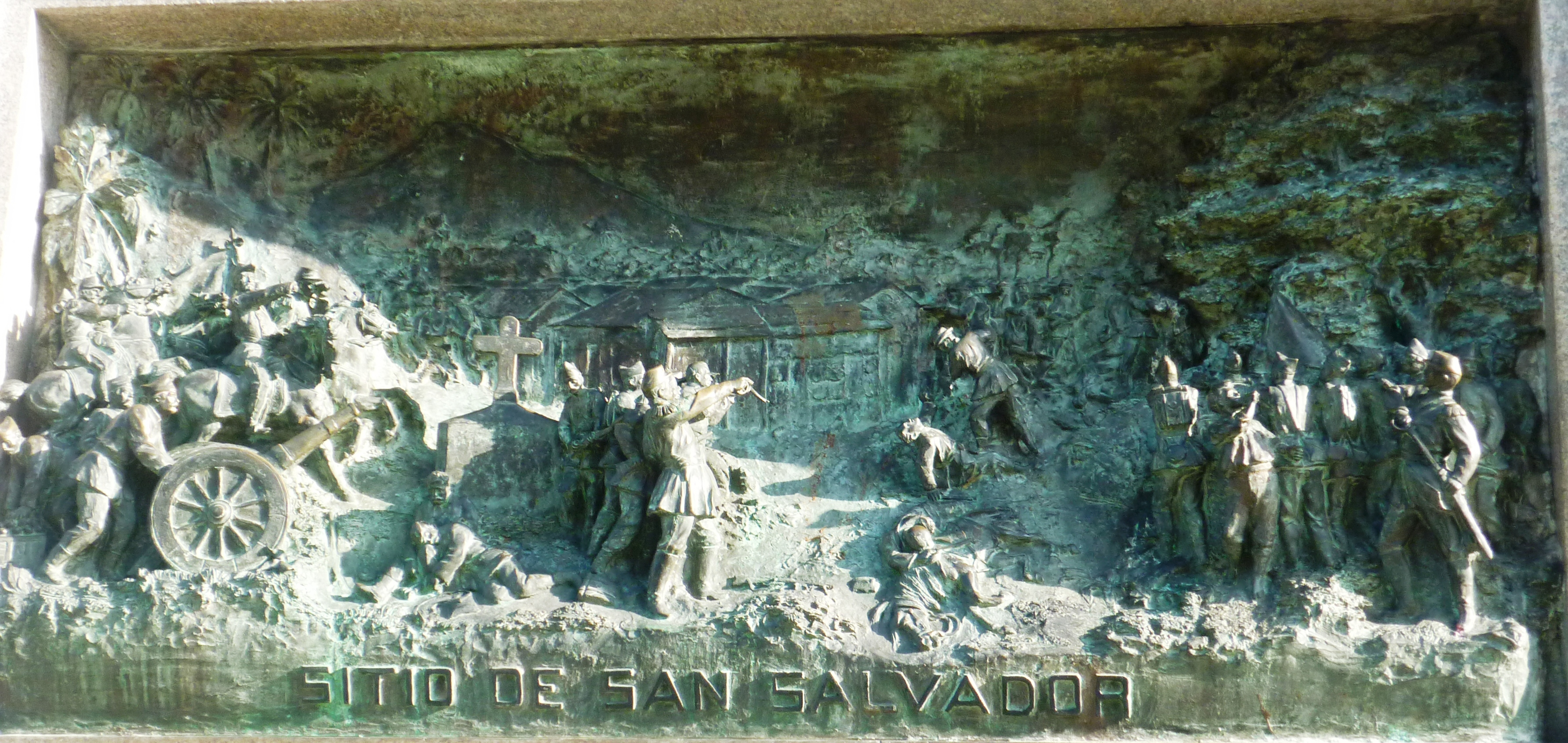
The Battle of Coatepeque (top) and the Siege of San Salvador (bottom).

In 1862, Carrera began plans to topple Barrios from power and install a conservative as president. On 13 February 1863, Carrera invaded El Salvador. He took control of the settlements of Ahuachapán, Chalchuapa, and Santa Ana, later establishing a headquarters in Jesús de los Milagros de Coatepeque.

On 22 February, the Salvadorans, led by Barrios, entrenched themselves in the town of Coatepeque and prepared for battle. After two days of battle, the Salvadorans won and forced the Guatemalans to retreat.

=== Siege of San Salvador ===
After his initial defeat, Carrera invaded El Salvador a second time on 19 June 1863. During the invasion, many Salvadorans deserted and either refused to take part in the war or joined the Guatemalans, most notably general Santiago González who served under Barrios during the Battle of Coatepeque. Salvadoran conservative politicians, such as Francisco Dueñas, also supported the Guatemalans.

On 30 September, he began a siege of the Salvadoran capital city, San Salvador. Carrera ordered a cease fire from San Salvador to submit, and after a month of being sieged, the capital fell on 26 October. Barrios fled the city and went east to San Miguel, after which, Dueñas was declared President of El Salvador. The fall of San Salvador marked the end of the war.

== Aftermath ==
Carrera died on 14 April 1865. Barrios fled for exile in Nicaragua but he was arrested on 27 July 1865 and extradited to El Salvador. He was court-martialed on 10 August and sentenced to death on 28 August. Barrios was executed by a firing squad on 29 August 1865.

== See also ==
- Nicaraguan-Salvadoran War, a related conflict
