= Year of the Three Emperors =

1888, in which the German Empire had three rulers in quick succession

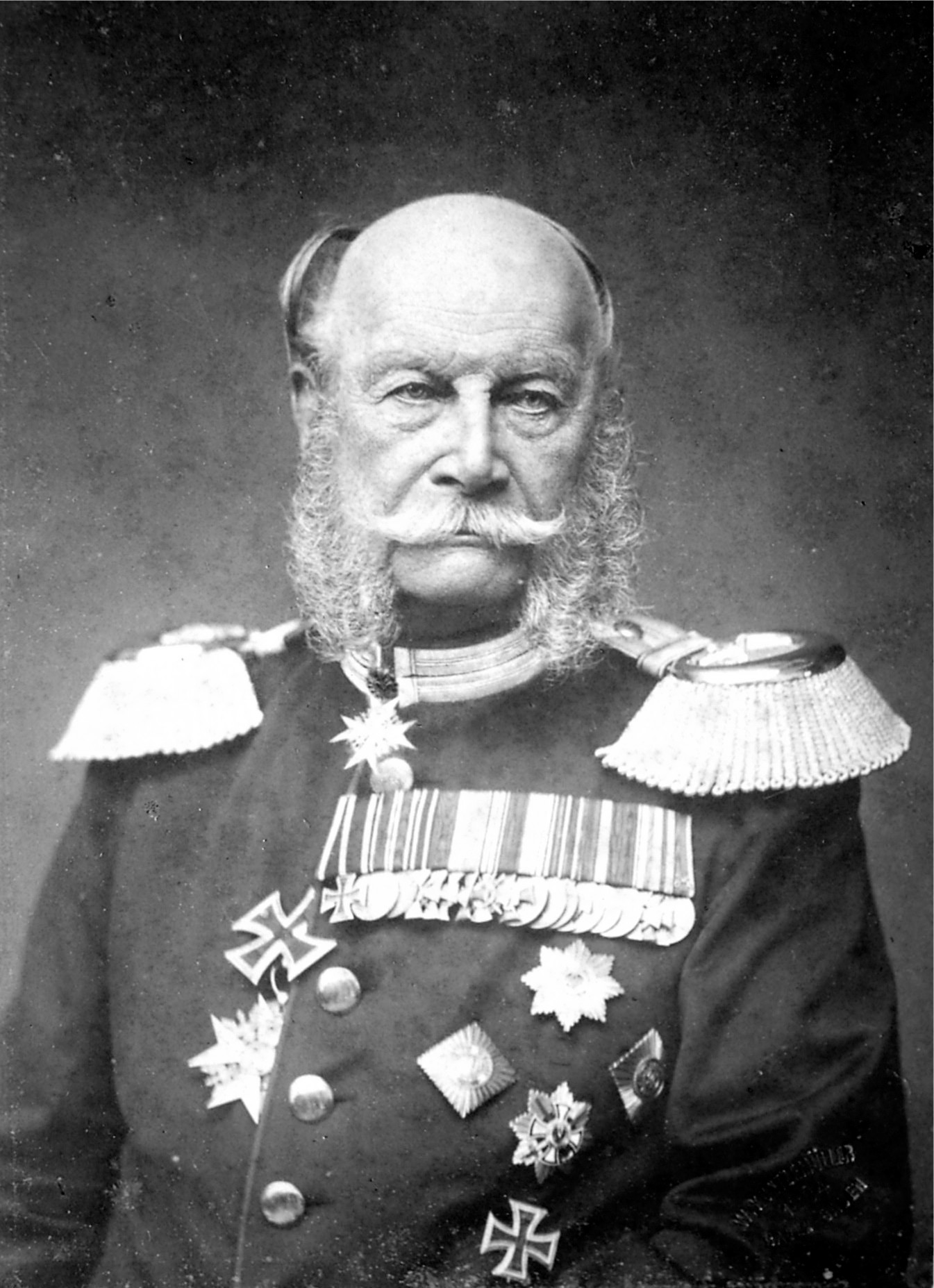
Wilhelm I reigned 18 January 1871 – 9 March 1888.

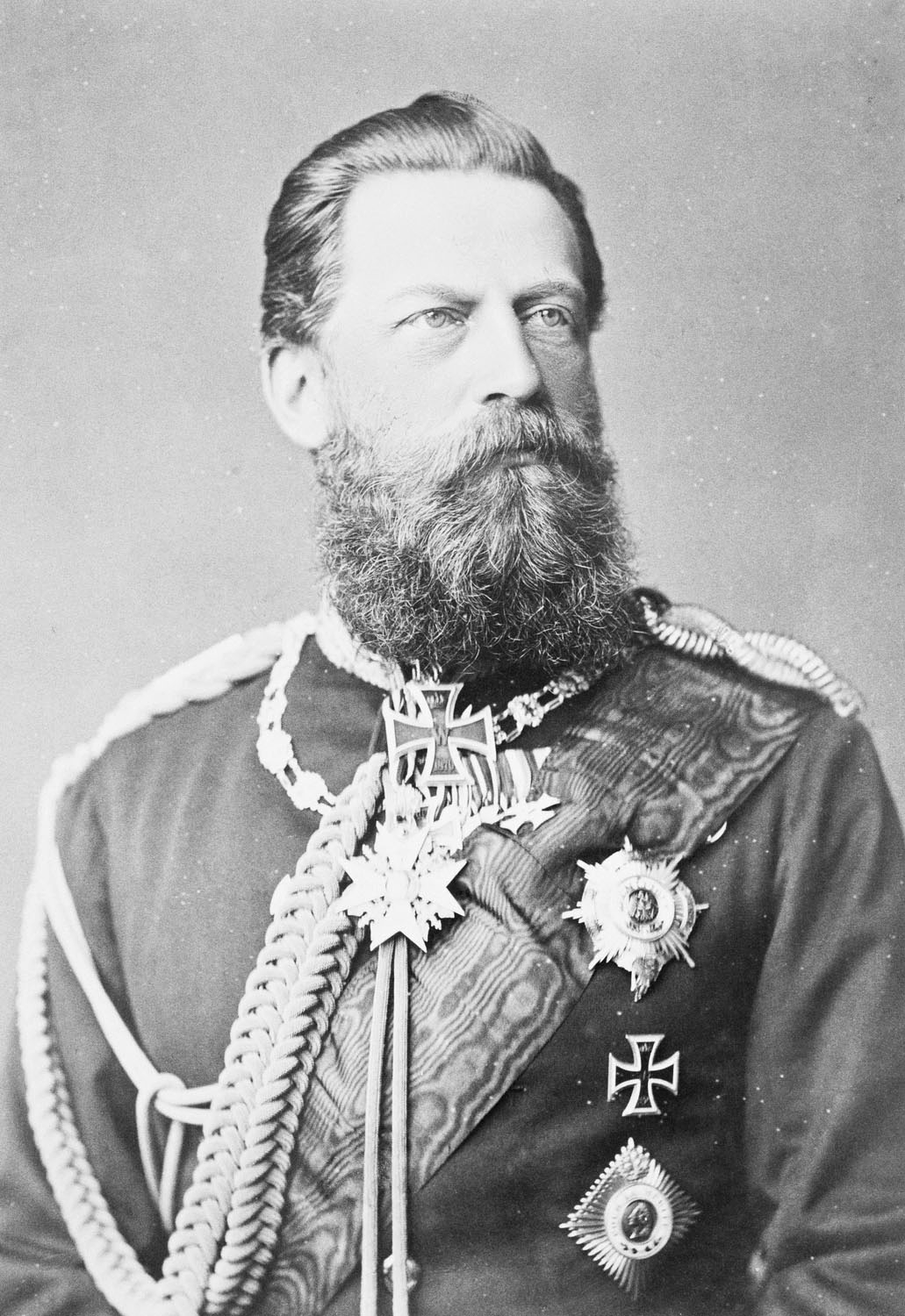
Friedrich III reigned for only 99 days: 9 March – 15 June 1888.

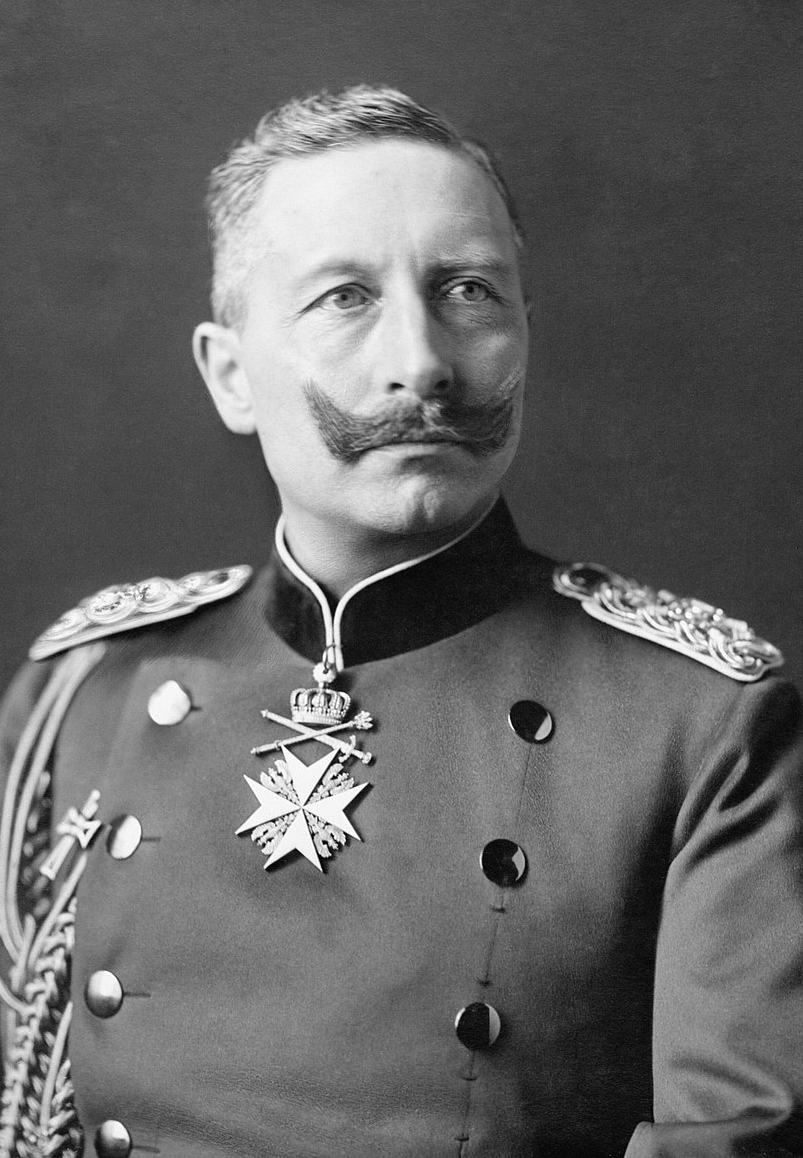
Wilhelm II reigned 15 June 1888 – 9 November 1918.

The Year of the Three Emperors, or the Year of the Three Kaisers (German: Dreikaiserjahr), refers to the year 1888 during the German Empire in German history. The year is considered to have memorable significance because of the deaths of two German Emperors, or Kaisers, leading to a rapid succession of three monarchs within one year. The three different emperors who ruled over Germany during this year were Wilhelm I, Friedrich III and Wilhelm II. The mnemonic "drei Achten, drei Kaiser" (English: "three eights, three emperors") is still used today in Germany by children and adults alike to memorize the year in question.

== Situation ==
Following the death of Frederick William IV in 1861, Wilhelm I became King of Prussia. As the monarch of the largest German state which had a key role in the unification, due largely to Bismarck's efforts, Emperor Wilhelm I had ruled over the German Empire ever since the unification of Germany on 18 January 1871. He lived until he was almost 91 years old and reigned over Prussia for 27 years and over Germany for 17 years. His son, Crown Prince Frederick William, was celebrated for his military actions because of his leadership during the wars fought to unify Germany. Frederick commanded staffs and armies during the Second Schleswig War, the Austro-Prussian War, and the Franco-Prussian War. Crown Prince Frederick William had just turned 56 before the year 1888. Frederick also had a number of children at the time, and his heir-apparent was named Wilhelm, after his grandfather. Wilhelm turned 29 in January 1888.

== Rapid succession ==
Emperor Wilhelm I died on 9 March 1888 after his long reign. He was then succeeded by his son, Frederick William. Frederick William became known as Frederick III when he assumed the throne. Along with his military successes, Frederick III was a reputed liberal and married to the United Kingdom's liberal Princess Royal Victoria. However, by the time of his father's death, Frederick was 56 years old and had already developed a terminal case of cancer of the larynx before he assumed the German imperial throne. Frederick attempted to have it treated, but it was not successful. Due to this illness and subsequent treatment, Frederick could not talk during his short reign and had to communicate through writing. Frederick still accomplished some of his duties as emperor despite his protracted illness; however, he did not have any lasting effect upon Germany. He died after only 99 days of rule on 15 June 1888. Frederick's son, Wilhelm II, then succeeded to the throne at age 29. Unlike his father, Wilhelm II did not have many liberal tendencies. Wilhelm II eventually led Germany into World War I and ruled until his abdication and the fall of the German Empire in 1918 at the end of war.

== See also ==
- List of German monarchs
- Year of the Three Kings
- Year of three popes
- Year of three presidents
- Year of three prime ministers
- Year of the Four Emperors
