= José Escolástico Marín =

Salvadoran politician

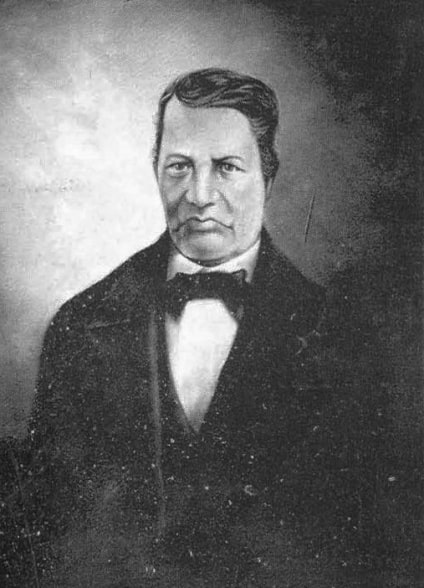

President of El Salvador
- In office 1 February 1842 – 12 April 1842; Acting President
- Preceded by: Juan Lindo
- Succeeded by: Dionisio Villacorta
- In office 19 July 1842 – 20 September 1842; Acting President
- Preceded by: Dionisio Villacorta
- Succeeded by: Juan José Guzmán

Personal details
- Born: San Vicente, El Salvador
- Died: 11 November 1846 San Vicente, El Salvador

General José Escolástico Marín (died 11 November 1846) was born in San Vicente. He was acting president of El Salvador from 1 February to 12 April and from 19 July to 26 September 1842.

He was killed in action while fighting against the government of President Eugenio Aguilar.

Political offices
Preceded by Juan Lindo	President of El Salvador; February 1, 1842–April 14, 1842	Succeeded by Juan José Guzmán
