= Coatepeque Caldera =

Caldera in El Salvador

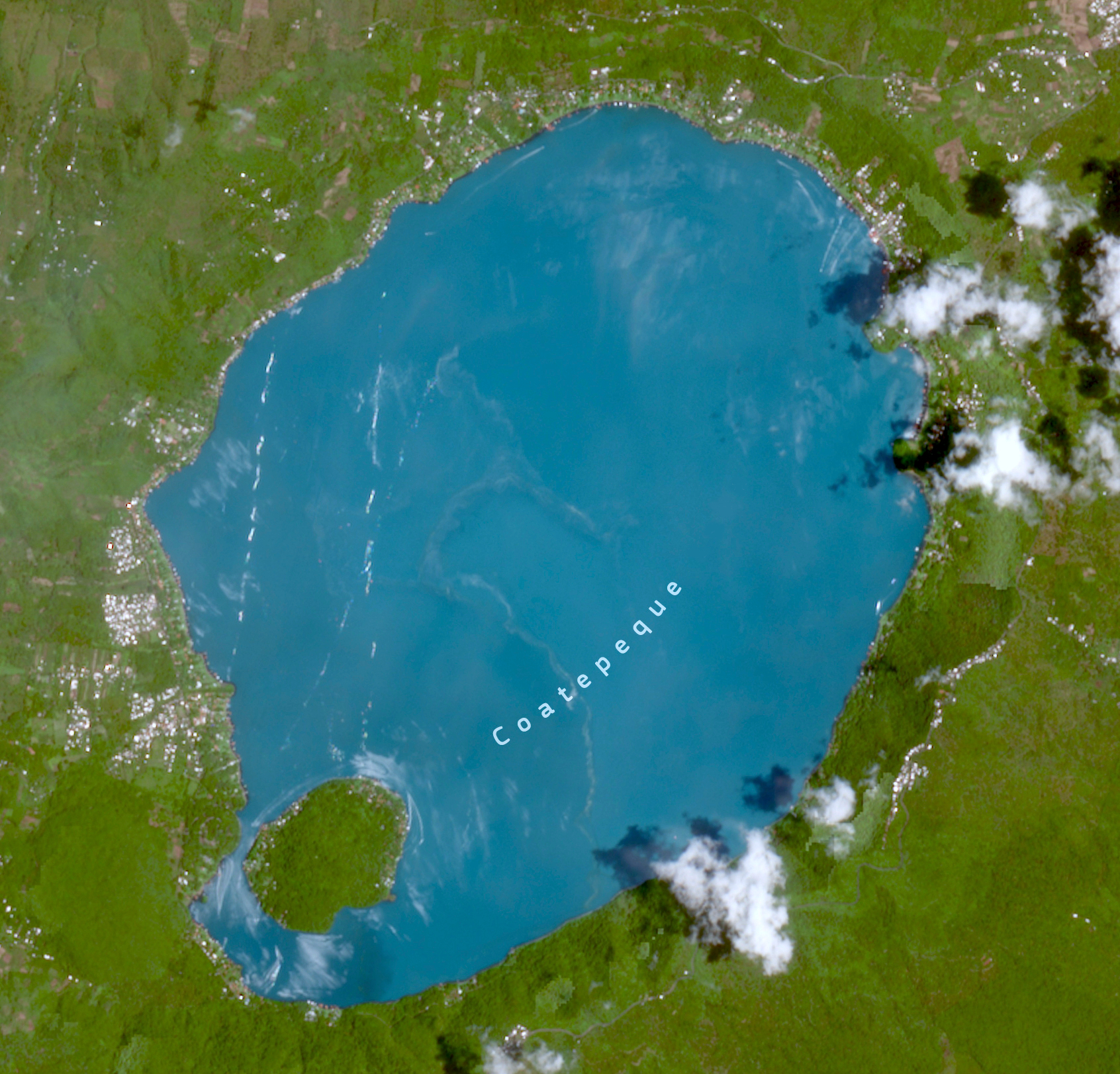
- Satellite view of the Coatepeque Caldera

Highest point
- Elevation: 746 m (2,448 ft)
- Coordinates: 13.87°N 89.55°W

Dimensions
- Length: 7 km (4.3 mi)
- Width: 10 km (6.2 mi)

Naming
- Native name: Kuātepēk (Pipil)
- English translation: "at the snake hill"

Geography
- Location within El Salvador
- Country: El Salvador
- Department: Santa Ana
- Municipality: Coatepeque

Geology
- Formed by: Volcanic eruption
- Mountain type(s): Caldera, stratovolcanoes
- Rock type(s): Rhyolite, Dacite, Andesite/Basaltic andesite, Pumice, Ignimbrite
- Volcanic arc: Central America Volcanic Arc
- Last eruption: 72,000 and 57,000 years ago
- Lake Coatepeque
- Lago de Coatepeque (Spanish)
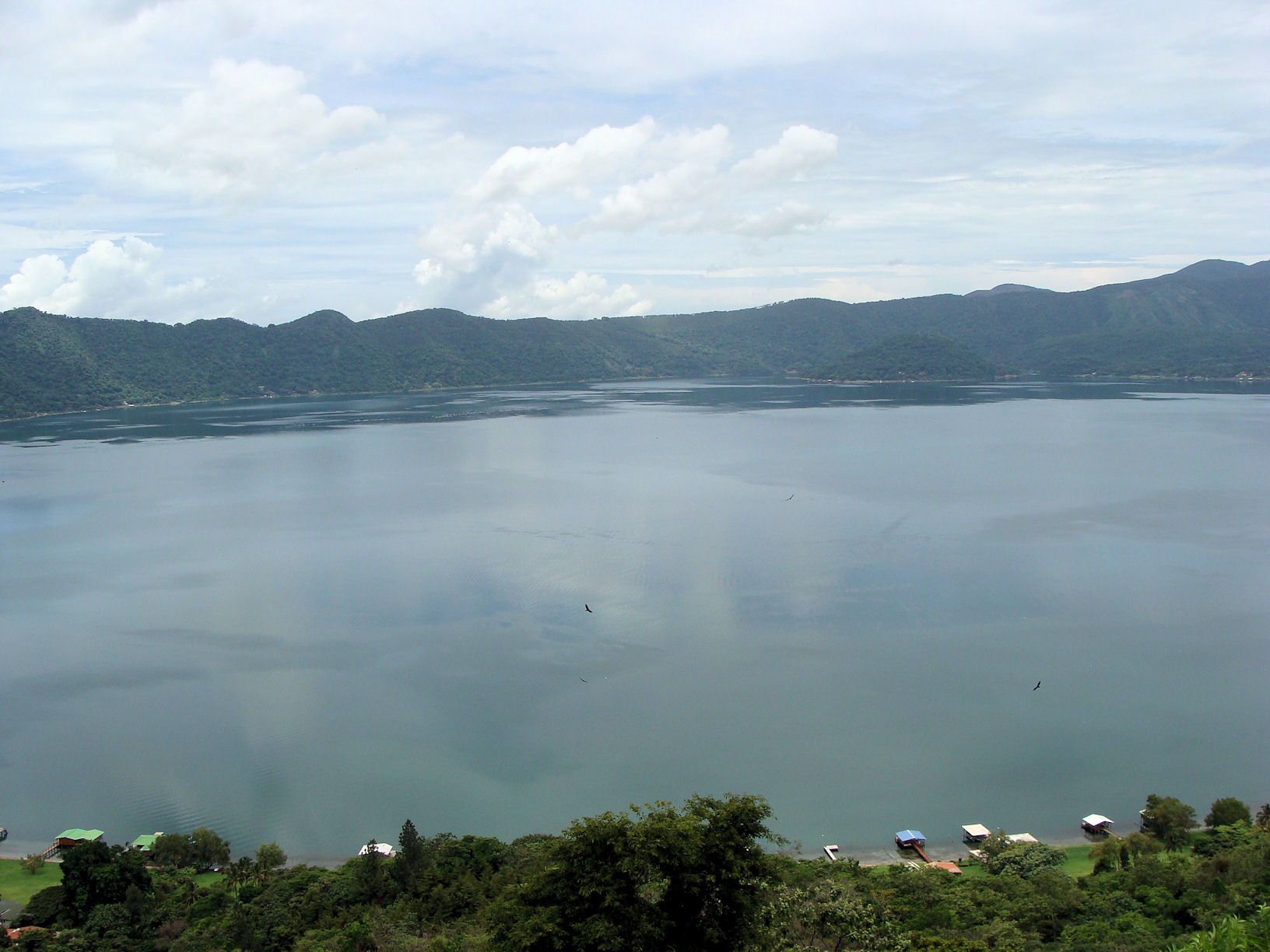
- Interactive map of Lake Coatepeque
- Location: Coatepeque, Santa Ana
- Coordinates: 13.864702°N 89.546800°W
- Type: Caldera lake
- Basin countries: El Salvador
- Max. length: 7 km (4.3 mi)
- Max. width: 10 km (6.2 mi)
- Surface area: 10 mi^{2} (26 km^{2})
- Average depth: 115 ft (35 m)
- Max. depth: 115 m (377 ft)
- Surface elevation: 745 m (2,444 ft)
- Islands: Isla Teopán

Coatepeque Caldera (Nawat: kuātepēk, "at the snake hill") is a volcanic caldera in El Salvador in Central America. The caldera was formed during a series of rhyolitic explosive eruptions from a group of stratovolcanoes between about 72,000 and 57,000 years ago. Since then, basaltic cinder cones and lava flows formed near the west edge of the caldera, and six rhyodacitic lava domes have formed. The youngest dome, Cerro Pacho, formed after 8000 BC.

== Lake Coatepeque ==
Lake Coatepeque (Lago de Coatepeque) is a large crater lake in the east part of the Coatepeque Caldera. It is in Coatepeque municipality, Santa Ana, El Salvador. There are hot springs near the lake margins. At 26 square kilometres (10 sq mi), it is one of the largest lakes in El Salvador. In the lake is the island of Teopan, which was a Mayan site of some importance.

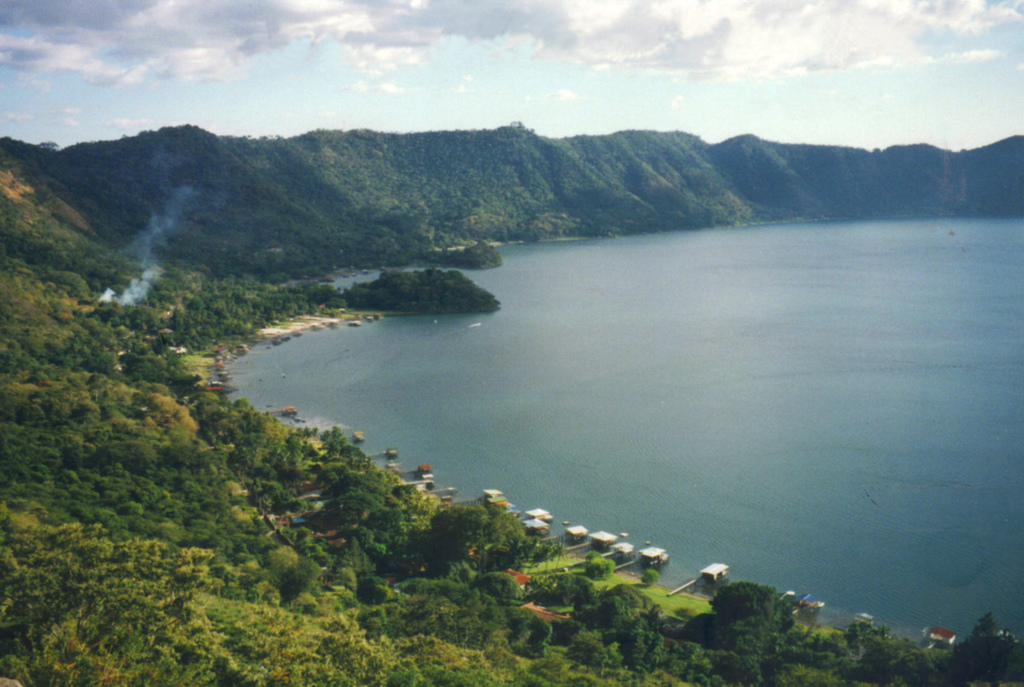

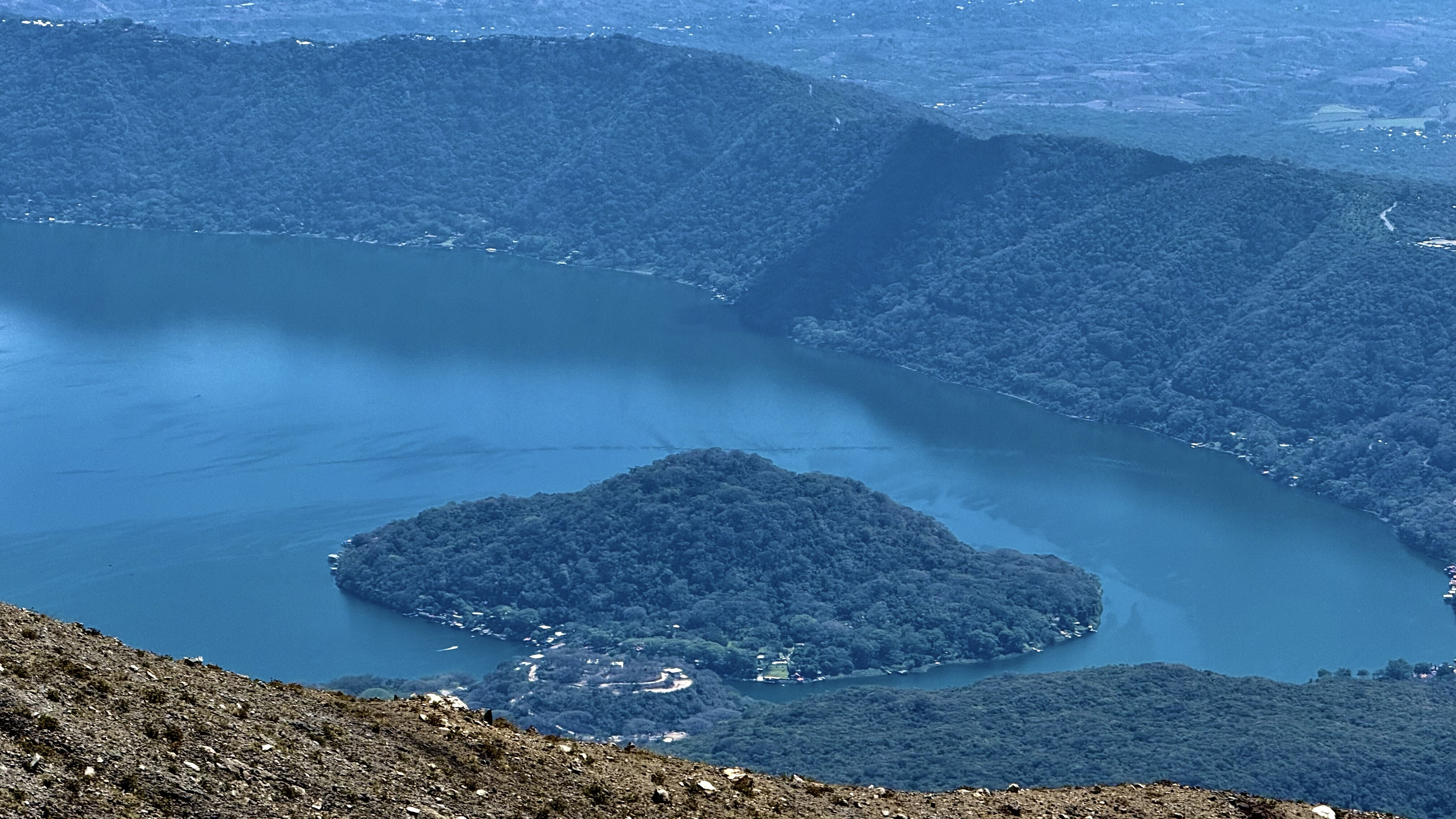
Isla Teopán

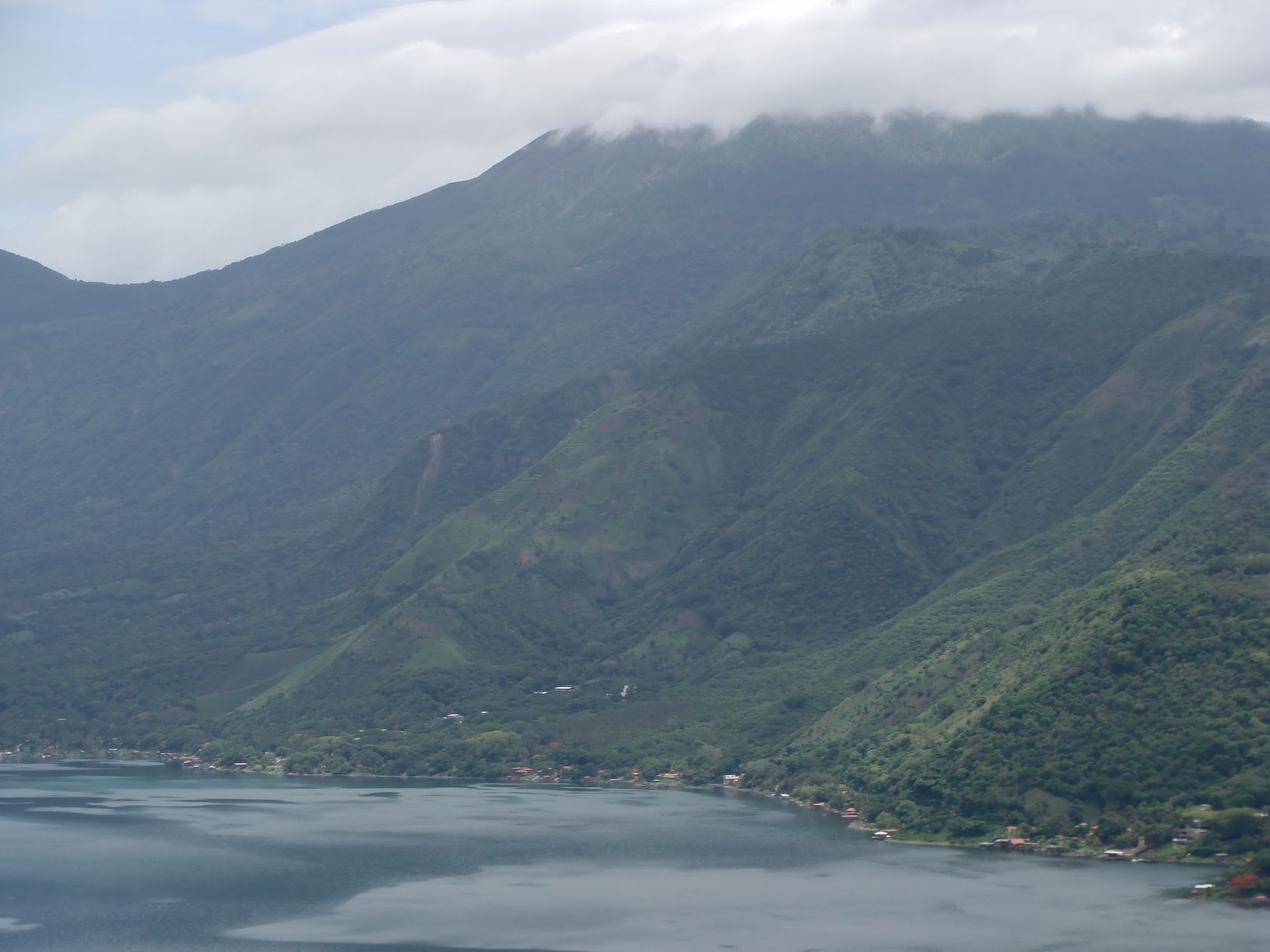

Lake Coatepeque is also known to change colors from blue to turquoise. According to authorities of the Ministry of Environment and Natural Resources of El Salvador, this is a cyclical phenomenon that occurs from time to time. The color change has happened in 1998, 2006, 2012, 2016, 2017, 2018, and 2019.

== See also ==
- List of volcanoes in El Salvador
