= Andrés del Valle =

President of El Salvador in 1876

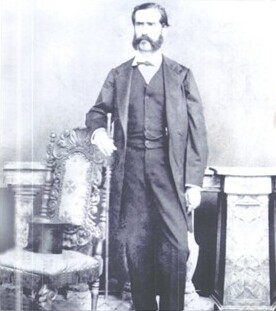
- Photograph of Del Valle, c.1880

13th President of El Salvador
- In office 1 February 1876 – 1 May 1876
- Vice President: Santiago González
- Preceded by: Santiago González
- Succeeded by: Rafael Zaldívar

Personal details
- Born: 30 November 1833 Santa Ana, El Salvador
- Died: 28 June 1888 (aged 54) San Salvador
- Party: Liberal party
- Profession: politician

Andrés del Valle Rodríguez (30 November 1833 – 28 June 1888) was the 13th President of El Salvador from February 1 until May 1, 1876.

His father Fernando del Valle was born in Santander and had made his fortune in trade and agriculture. Andrés del Valle was a member of the constitutional assembly from 1872 until 1873. In 1874 he became senator for the Santa Ana Department. In 1875, he was vice-chairman of the Senate and chairman of the parliament. On March 1, 1875, the parliament called for elections on the first Sunday of December that year.

Andres was elected for the administration between February 1, 1876, and February 1, 1880. His vice-president was the predecessor, Santiago González. A government loan of a half a million USD was enforced on the same day.

Justo Rufino Barrios Auyón, then president of Guatemala, was skeptical, because Santiago González supported political refugees from Guatemala. He also suspected Ponciano Leiva from Honduras to be planning to overthrow him.

Barrios let Valle know, that in case he planned to continue this course, he would see to it that the Guatemalan government would support José María Medina from Honduras in overthrowing Ponciano Leiva.

== Conference at Volcán Chingo ==
The government of El Salvador insisted on González's goodwill and a conference at the Volcán Chingo was agreed on, at which, with mediation of Marco Aurelio Soto, an agreement was signed.

Barrios was convinced, González remained the actual head of state in El Salvador and insinuated him holding public speeches, as well as committing hypocrisy and treason.

== Guerra de Barrios ==
Barrios let 1.500 soldiers attack Honduras and led an army himself, which entered Salvador without a declaration of war from the West.

On March 20, 1876, the Guatemalan Secretary of War, Jose Maria Samayoa, declared all official relations with El Salvador as terminated, asserted that on March 27, 1876, troops from El Salvador had invaded Guatemala, declared war and gave Barrio absolute power for defending Guatemala's dignity. On March 26, 1876, the government of El Salvador declared the Friendliness- and Support act closed with Guatemala on January 24, 1872, for void. Barrio's plan was to directly attack El Salvador from the West, from Guatemala with one of his armies and, at the same time attack the Departments of San Miguel and La Union from the East, through Honduras. At that time, Mexican General Jose Lopez Uraga was stationed at camp Jutiapa to guard the arsenal there. The troops were unsuccessfully attacking an isolated station on the border from El Salvador, which led Barrios to pass orders to Uraga to move the equipment to Chingo, whilst himself commencing the attack on El Salvador. Barrios held Chalcuapa in garrison. The headquarters of El Salvador was in Santa Ana. Barrios besieged Ahuachapan with approx. 8000 soldiers, Uraga led approx. 1500 soldiers in Chalchuapa and only a handful of soldiers remained in Chingo.

The Guatemalan troops holding Apaneca in garrison were forced back. When they tried to return on the morning of April 15, 1875, they involved in combat lasting well into the night until they retreated to Atiquizaya having suffered severe casualties.

Between April 17 and 19 1876, General Gregorio Solares had the troops of generals Brioso, Delgado, Sanchez and Espinosa beat and thus controlled the Departments San Miguel an La Union, threatening the Departments San Vincete as well as Usulután and even the official residence of President Valle, cutting off the Salvadorian government from essential resources. Approx. 800 Salvadorian soldiers had been killed and the troops retreated to San Miguel, where only 200 soldiers arrived. Solares had San Miguel and La Union held in garrison. There were enough soldiers to defend Ciudad San Vecente, but the government of El Salvador gave orders for the garrison to troop in the capital.

In the West, the army of El Salvador had shrunk to 2600 during the Semana Santa battle in Ahuachapan and nearly 3500 in Santa Ana. After Easter, there were only 900 soldiers left to try to take in Chalchuapa, in vain.

During the siege of Atiquizaya, according to the American historian Hubert Howe Bancroft, Barrio had 900 bombs thrown, subsequently marching into Ahuachapan and the following day into Cahlchuapa, where peace talks took place. A peace accord was closed on April 25, 1876, and ratified by the parliaments the following day. This peace was preconditioned by a Conditio-sine-qua-non-formula of a complete replacement of the government of El Salvador. President Valle was forced to resign.

Political offices
Preceded by Santiago González	President of El Salvador; 1876	Succeeded by Rafael Zaldívar
