= Jorge de Viteri y Ungo =

Roman Catholic bishop

- Bishop of San Salvador
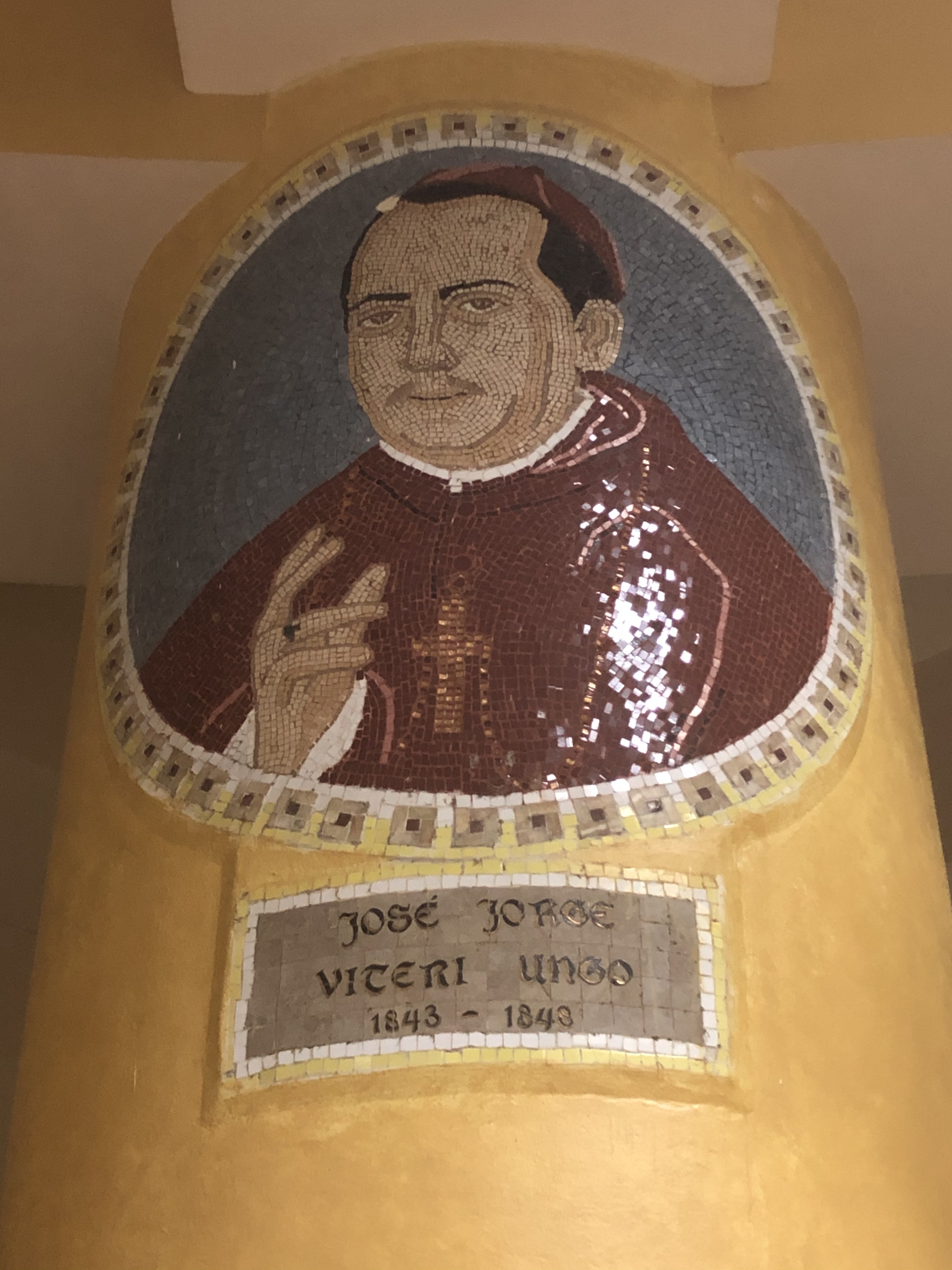
- Icon of Jorge de Viteri y Ungo in the Metropolitan Cathedral of San Salvador
- Church: Catholic Church
- Diocese: San Salvador
- Installed: 27 January 1843
- Term ended: 5 November 1849
- Predecessor: Diocese established
- Successor: Tomás Miguel Pineda y Saldaña
- Other post: Bishop of Nicaragua (1849–1853)

Orders
- Ordination: 18 February 1826
- Consecration: 29 January 1843

Personal details
- Born: José Jorge de Viteri y Ungo; 24 April 1802 San Salvador, Guatemala, New Spain, Spanish Empire
- Died: 25 July 1853 (aged 51) León, León, Nicaragua
- Denomination: Catholicism

Ordination history
History
Episcopal consecration
- Principal consecrator: Giacomo Filippo Fransoni
- Co-consecrators: Antonio Fernando José de Echánove y Zaldívar, Luigi Guglielmi
Episcopal succession
Bishops consecrated by Jorge de Viteri y Ungo as principal consecrator
- Francisco de Paul García Peláez: 11 February 1844
- Francisco de Paula Campo y Pérez: 12 January 1845

José Jorge de Viteri y Ungo (24 April 1802 – 25 July 1853) was a Roman Catholic bishop who served as the first Bishop of San Salvador from 1843 until 1849, when he was appointed as Bishop of Nicaragua until his death in 1853.

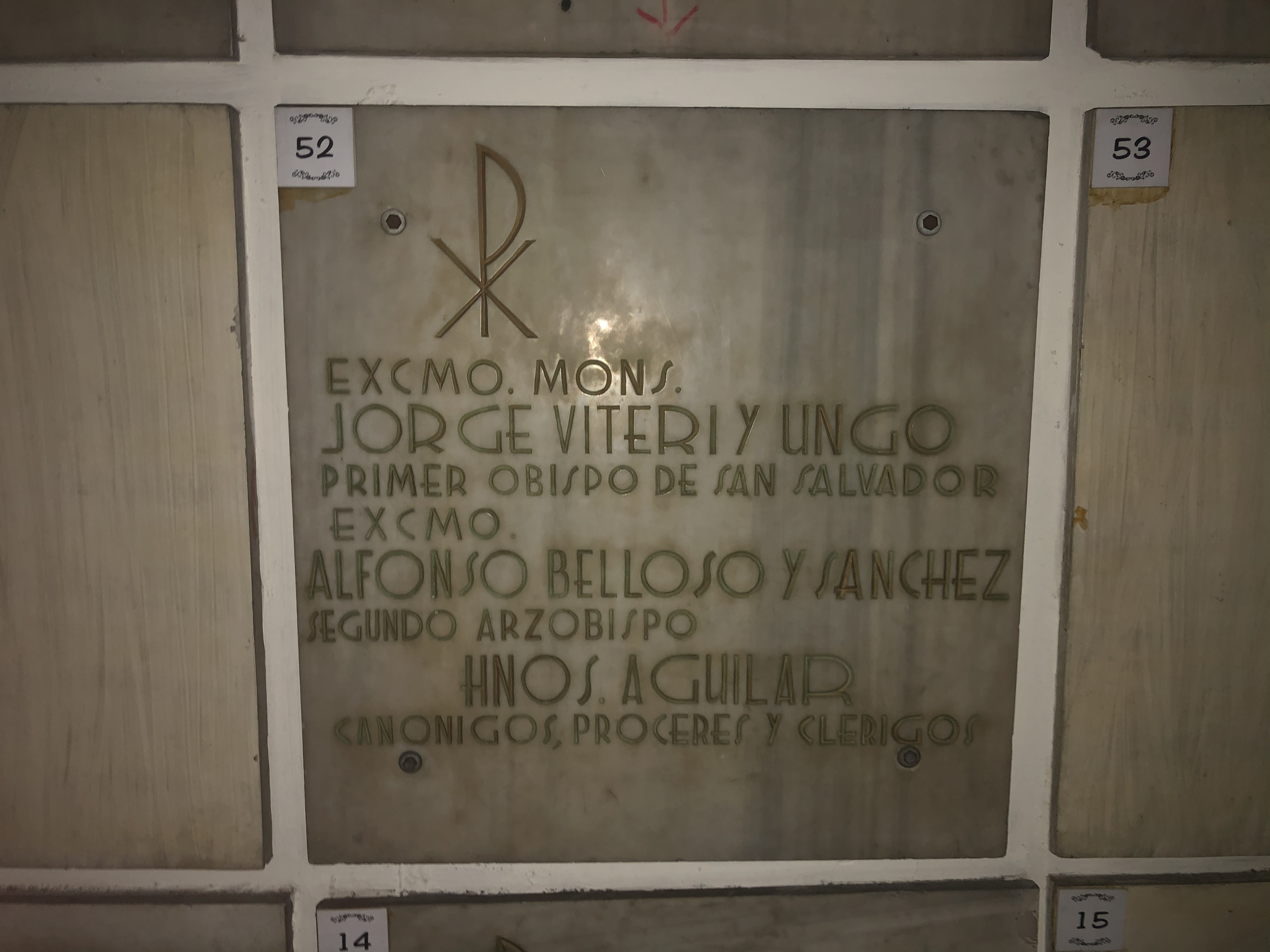
Viteri y Ungo's tomb in the San Salvador Cathedral.

Catholic Church titles
New diocese	— TITULAR — Bishop of San Salvador; 1843–1849	Succeeded by Tomás Miguel Pineda y Saldaña
Preceded by Nicolás García Jerez	— TITULAR — Bishop of Nicaragua; 1843–1849	Succeeded by José Bernardo Piñol y Aycinena
