= Coatepeque, El Salvador =

Coatepeque
- District
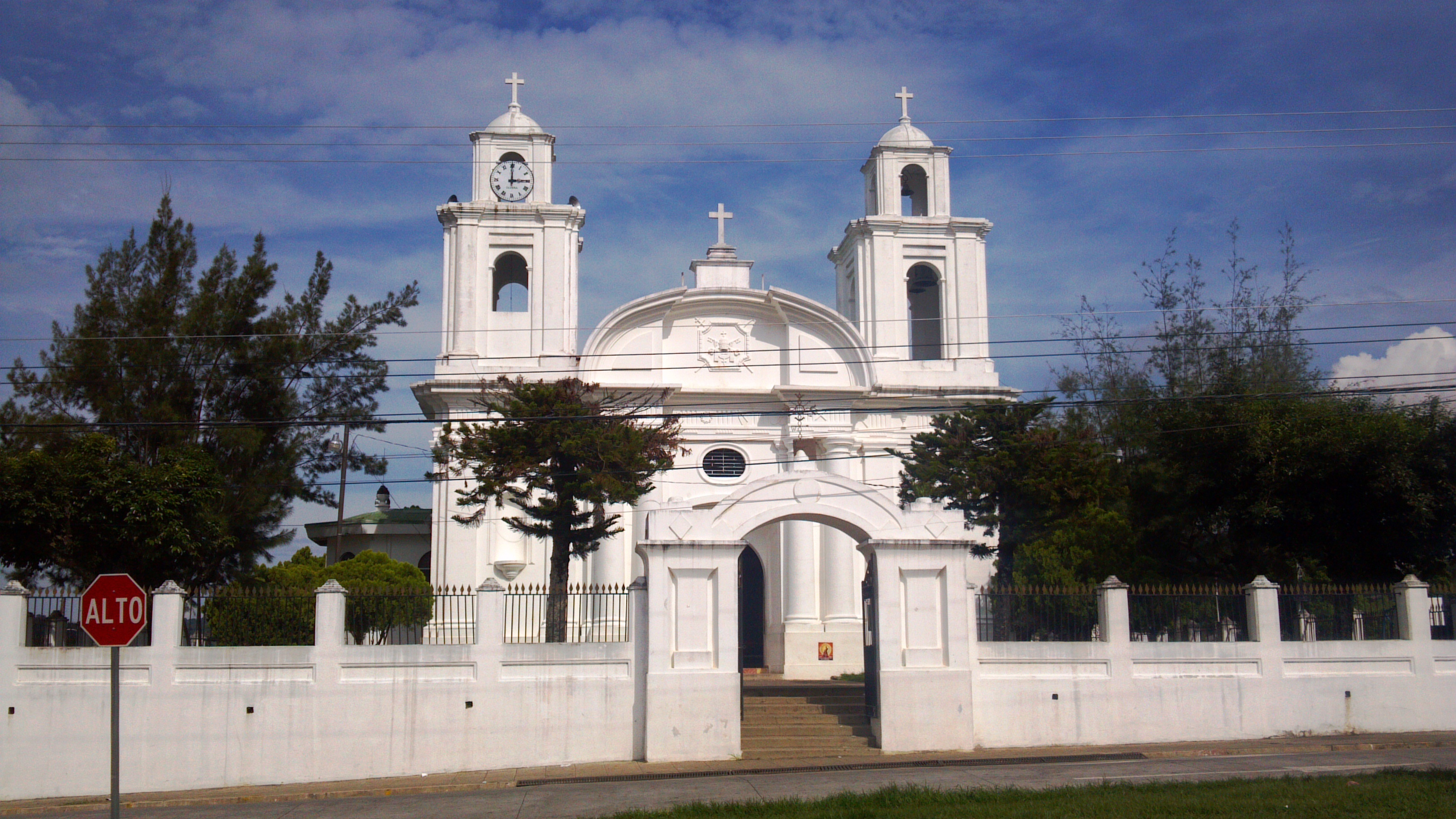
- Front-view of the parish of San Pedro Apóstol in Coatepeque.

- Location in El Salvador
- Coordinates: 13°55′N 89°30′W
- Country: El Salvador
- Department: Santa Ana
- Municipality: Santa Ana Este

Government
  - Mayor: Carolina Escobar

Area
  - District: 48.98 sq mi (126.85 km^{2})
- Elevation: 2,490 ft (760 m)

Population
  - District: 36,371

Coatepeque (Nawat: kuātepēk) is a district in the municipality of Santa Ana Este in the Santa Ana department of El Salvador. It is above El Congo, south of the department's capital and is bordered by the department of La Libertad in the East.

== Etymology ==
Coatepeque is the Hispanicized form of Kuatepek from the Nawat language: with kuat meaning snake and tepet meaning mountain. Thus translating to Snake Mountain, sometimes Mixcoatl Mountain (to honor of Mixcoatl, an Aztec god associated with hunting and war) or cerro de la serpiente in Spanish.

== History ==
Initially inhabited by the Poqomam Maya, it was conquered by the Nahuas of Cuzcatlan around the 1200s, forming the altepetl of the same name. It fell to Spanish rule after the Spanish conquest of El Salvador in the early 16th century. During the colonial period, it was under the Alcaldia Mayor de San Salvador. Post independence it was a part of the Sonsonate department until its split, joining the newly created Santa Ana in 1855. It was first granted the title of villa on October 12, 1858, and getting promoted to city on March 25, 1917. Both the town and lake were one in the same before the municipality was split on March 20, 1933, to form El Congo. Due to the 2023 municipality restructuring, Coatepeque was re-categorized as a district and joined El Congo under the municipality of Santa Ana Este.

It was the epicenter of the Battle of Coatepeque, where Salvadoran forces successfully defended the city from invading Guatemalan forces.

== Administration ==
The current mayor is Carolina Escobar from Nuevas Ideas, representing Santa Ana Este since 2024. Coatepeque is made up of 16 districts known as cantones and 83 hamlets:

- Caña Brava
- Conacastes
- Concepción
- El Cerro
- El Tinteral
- Jocotón
- Junquillo
- La Joya
- Las Piletas
- Palo Negro
- Resbaladero
- Solimán
- Siete Príncipes
- San Felipe
- San Jacinto
- Zacatal

== Culture ==
Its patron saint is Saint Peter the Apostle, who is celebrated from June 20 to June 29.

== See also ==
- Coatepeque Caldera
