= Fermín Palacios =

Salvadoran politician

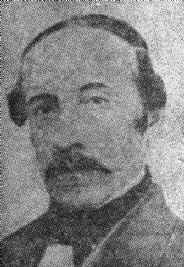

President of El Salvador
- In office 1 February 1844 – 7 February 1844; Acting President
- Preceded by: Pedro José Arce
- Succeeded by: Francisco Malespín
- In office 16 February 1845 – 25 April 1845; Acting President
- Succeeded by: Joaquín Eufrasio Guzmán
- In office 1 February 1846 – 21 February 1846
- Preceded by: Joaquín Eufrasio Guzmán
- Succeeded by: Eugenio Aguilar
- In office 12 July 1846 – 21 July 1846; Acting President
- Preceded by: Eugenio Aguilar
- Succeeded by: Eugenio Aguilar

Personal details
- Born: San Salvador, El Salvador
- Profession: politician

Fermín Palacios was president of El Salvador, four times between 1844 and 1846. He was born in San Salvador.

Political offices
Preceded by Joaquín Eufrasio Guzmán	President of El Salvador; 1 February 1844 – 7 February 1844	Succeeded by Eugenio Aguilar (acting)
