= Santiago González (politician) =

Salvadoran military officer and general

Marshal Santiago González
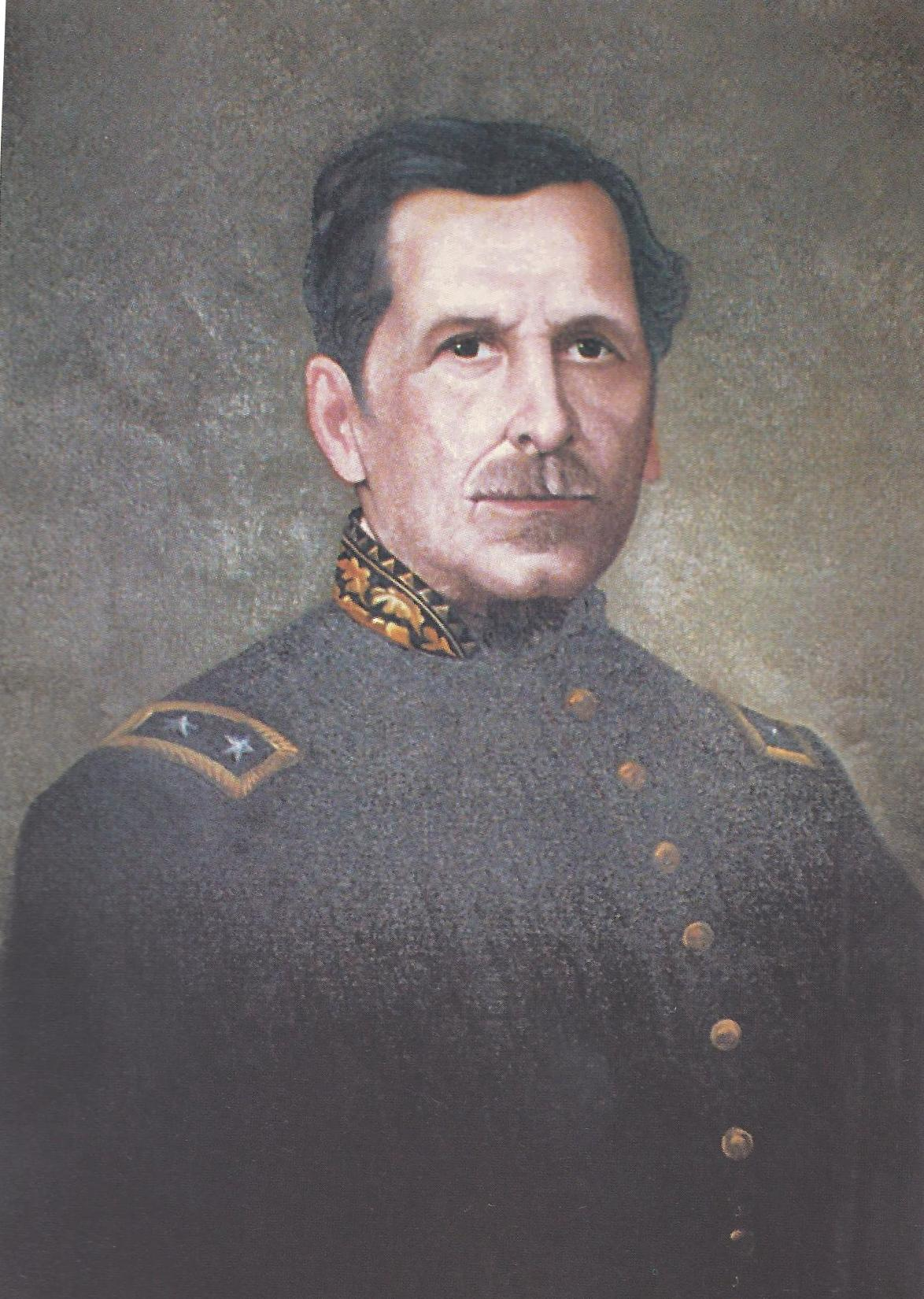

12th President of El Salvador
- In office 15 April 1871 – 1 February 1876; Provisional President until 1 February 1872
- Vice President: Vacant (1871–1872); Manuel Méndez (1872); Vacant (1872–1876)
- Preceded by: Francisco Dueñas
- Succeeded by: Andrés del Valle

21st Vice President of El Salvador
- In office 1 February 1876 – 1 May 1876
- President: Andrés del Valle
- Preceded by: Manuel Méndez
- Succeeded by: Baltasar Estupinián

19th President of the National Assembly of El Salvador
- In office 16 January 1863 – 29 January 1863
- President: Gerardo Barrios
- Preceded by: Himself
- Succeeded by: Ireneo Chacón
- In office 27 January 1862 – 26 February 1862
- President: Gerardo Barrios
- Preceded by: José Ángel Quirós
- Succeeded by: Himself

Personal details
- Born: 25 July 1818 Zacapa, Guatemala
- Died: 1 August 1887 (aged 69) San Salvador, El Salvador
- Party: Liberal
- Spouse: Soledad Fortis (m. 1866)
- Profession: Military, politician

Military service
- Allegiance: El Salvador
- Branch/service: Salvadoran Army
- Years of service: ? – ?
- Rank: Marshal
- Battles/wars: War of 1863; Battle of Coatepeque; Siege of San Salvador

Santiago González Portillo (25 July 1818 – 1 August 1887) was a Salvadoran military officer and general who served as the 12th President of El Salvador from 15 April 1871 to 1 February 1876.

== Biography ==
Santiago González Portillo was born on 25 July 1818 in Zacapa, Captaincy General of Guatemala, Viceroyalty of New Spain. He married Soledad Fortis on 1 March 1866.

He served as President of the Legislative Assembly in 1862 and again in 1863 during the presidency of Captain General Gerardo Barrios. During the War of 1863, he fought alongside Barrios at the Battle of Coatepeque. He later deserted Barrios and joined the invading Guatemalans under Rafael Carrera. Under the new government of Francisco Dueñas, he served as the Minister of War of El Salvador from 1863 until 1871, when he led a revolution against Dueñas' conservative government, which was overthrown. He also amended the constitution. He became President of El Salvador after his revolution and served until 1876.

He served as Vice President and commander-in-chief of the army during the term of his successor, Andrés del Valle.

He died on 1 August 1887 in San Salvador.

Political offices
Preceded by Francisco Dueñas	President of El Salvador; 1871–1876	Succeeded by Andrés del Valle
