= Radio in Honduras =

Radio in Honduras began in 1928, when the Tela Railroad Company established Tropical Radio. The first commercial radio station, Radio HRN, began broadcasting in 1933.

== History ==
In August 1920 a group known as Los Chicos del Coliseo began broadcasting from Teatro Coliseo in Buenos Aires, but it would take many years for radio to arrive in places such as the isthmus of Central America. In Honduras, radio experimentation had begun with local transmissions. American companies (known as bananeras) were just a few of the companies providing employment before and after World War II.

In 1928 the Tela Railroad Company (one of the two major railroads) had received a license to establish a radio station (known as Tropical Radio). It broadcast on the 51-meter shortwave band, and HRB (La Voz del Trópico) was the first radio station in Honduras. HRB was not a "commercial" radio station. It was a medium for the Tela Railroad Company to broadcast its own bulletins.

It also played recorded music and featured live performances by local talent (including the Sisters Cordova and pianist Guadalupe Ferrari Hartling), marimba bands, singers, poets and other artists. HRB did not last long, but it inspired several individuals to keep the broadcasting flame alive.

Rafael Ferrari Garcia, an entrepreneur with great ambitions but little money, sold everything he owned to embark on a risky plan; he received permission to install the first commercial radio station in Tegucigalpa. It was known as La Voz del Comercio; to maintain its operation, he obtained commercial sponsorship from local businesses (retail and professional) and government agencies. From this HRN (La Primera Emisora del País) was born; Ferrari was credited as the first radio personality in Honduras.

The station was founded on November 1, 1933. Kenneth See and Paul John were the principal technical engineers and attorney Manuel Bonilla Rodriguez, Nicholas Odeh, Rodolfo Brevé Martinez and Ferrari were the station's staff announcers. Bonilla Rodriguez was the first to broadcast a soccer game in 1935 between a Costa Rican team and Club Motagua, a renowned Honduran team. Assisting Bonilla as engineer was Nat Lopez Fuentes, from a Family Radio dynasty known nationwide.

There were only a handful of radio receivers and to reach a wide audience Ferrari installed loudspeakers at various locations in Tegucigalpa. This was a daily pastime, an occasion for locals to meet and enjoy the programming. At first the programming was limited to news, government bulletins and recorded music. However, during the 1940s the station acquired a more powerful transmitter, reaching audiences in faraway countries with its shortwave signal.

HRN was important during World War II, since it rebroadcast information from the BBC in London and NBC in the United States. Ferrari continued his support of local talent with broadcasts including pianists, marimba bands, orchestras, singers, poets, composers, comedians and amateur artists. After the war, Europe, Asia and North America began to rebuild their economies and Honduras enjoyed some prosperity and tranquility under the Carias Andino regime.

HRN became one of many private enterprises which enjoyed a modest increase in business. During this time, the station replaced La Voz del Comercio for its current slogan, La Voz de Honduras. Ferrari expanded the station, providing opportunity to a new generation of promising talent; some became household names, solidifying HRN's position as a powerhouse of Central American radio.

Top 20 Honduras Radio Personalities

1. Rafael Ferrari García
2. Antonio Mazariegos Velasco
3. Nicholas Odeh
4. Manuel Bonilla Rodriguez
5. Rodolfo Brevé Martinez
6. Rigoberto Cuellar Cerrato
7. Gustavo Acosta Mejía
8. Raul Agüero Neda
9. Christina Rubio
10. Manuel Villeda Toledo
11. Francisco Rolando Ramos
12. Nahum Valladares
13. Ruben "Chito" Fuentes Flores
14. Moisés Ulloa Duarte
15. Orfa Mejía Arauz
16. Jorge Figueroa Rush
17. Sigfrido Munez
18. Roberto Diaz Lechuga
19. Carlos Eduardo Riedel Morales
20. Hector Maradiaga Mendoza

{The writer; Roque Morán Hernandez, was the youngest announcer during the late 1950s}.

=== Radio America ===
1948 marked the birth of Radio America. At that time Tegucigalpa (the capital) comprised two cities, divided by the Rio Choluteca. It was a small metropolis, both geographically and in population. Radio America broadcast with three kW of power; small by later standards, but sufficient for experimentation. Soon it increased its power to 10 kW, easily reaching audiences in the twin cities of Tegucigalpa and Comayagüela.

The station was first owned by Sergio Castellón who, within a few years, sold it to Cuban entrepreneur Rafael Silvio Peña. Peña, bringing the Cuban concept of radio as a fresh approach, began with live performances (especially radio-novelas, or soap-operas). Peña brought in Emilio Díaz; the two developed programs popular in Cuba such as "La Tremenda Corte", which was known throughout Latin America. Subsequently Dr. Andonie Fernandez bought the station, maintaining its tradition while ushering in a new era.

Several changes took place, the most important of which was the addition of well-known radio personalities and the highest-rated program ("Platicando con mi Barbero", after the cast left HRN). This program featured a group headed by humorist Herman Allan Padgett, considered a genius for his comic range and originality. Padgett had gathered the best-known talent of the time, including Julio Lopez Fuentes, Abelardo Enrique Avendaño and Ricardo Antonio Redondo Licona. Like HRN, Radio America strives to improve; Fernandez created a conglomerate within the communications industry in Central America.

=== Musiquera ===
HRAX-FM Radio Musiquera or better known as Musiquera is a Honduran radio station based in San Pedro Sula, department of Cortés, founded in 1993. It broadcasts from that city through the frequency 93.3 FM. Their catchphrase is "Tu Mejor Compañera." The station currently enjoys a high level of popularity among the Honduran population and abroad. This station is part of the A.G Multimedia group, to which other stations such as Radioactiva 99.7 FM, Estéreo Clase 92.9 FM and the TV channel Activa TV also belong.

Musiquera has national coverage, through more than 20 repeaters linked via satellite.

== See also ==
- Media of Honduras

== Sources ==
- Valladares, Nahum (2000). "La Historia de la Radio en el Siglo XX", UNAH. 384.54-V176.C2.
- Valladares, Nahum (2008). "Grandes Veteranos de la HRN", La Tribuna, article/47768/2008-11-04
