= List of radio stations in Honduras =

Radio Stations in Honduras.

== Colón ==
- HRAX Musiquera 89.3 MHz
- HRAY Stereo Miggy 90.5 MHz
- HRVV Radioactiva 92.1 MHz
- HRXH Radio Globo 93.3 MHz

== Comayagua ==
Frequency	Name	Callsign	RDS
88.3 MHz	HR--	HR--	NO
88.7 MHz	Radio Planeta	HR--	NO
90.3 MHz	Radio Católica	HRLK	NO
90.7 MHz	Radio Globo	HRXH	SI
91.1 MHz	Musiquera	HRAX	NO
91.9 MHz	Power FM	HRSX	NO
92.7 MHz	LHT FM	HR--	NO
93.5 MHz	Radio Visión Honduras	HR--	NO
93.9 MHz	Cadena Radial Impacto	HRJB	NO
94.3 MHz	Radio América	HRLP	SÍ
94.7 MHz	HCH Radio	HRMT	SÍ
96.7 MHz	La 96	HR--	NO
97.5 MHz	Radio Metrópolis	HRAS	SÍ
98.3 MHz	Super 100	HRNQ	NO
98.7 MHz	Radio País	HR--	NO
99.9 MHz	Radio Corporación	HRDL	NO
100.3 MHz	Estéreo Sistema	HR--	NO
101.5 MHz	HRN	HRN	SÍ
102.3 MHz	SB Stereo	HRBH	NO
102.7 MHz	Suprema FM	HRZW	NO
103.1 MHz	Giré Estéreo	HR--	NO
103.5 MHz	Estéreo Visión	HRBY	SÍ
104.7 MHz	La Musical	HREW	SÍ
105.9 MHz	Radio F.E.	HRFE	NO
107.1 MHz	Jets-emani	HR--	NO

== Copán ==
- HRRH La Voz de Occidente 92.3 MHz
- HRAX Musiquera 100.3 MHz

== Cortés ==
=== San Pedro Sula ===
Frequency	Name	Callsign	RDS
88.1 MHz	Magia FM	HRSH	
88.5 MHz	La Zeta	HR--	
88.9 MHz	Radio San Pedro	HRBS	
89.3 MHz	Exa FM	HRDJ	
89.7 MHz	Radio a.b.c	HR--	
90.1 MHz	Power FM	HRSX	
90.5 MHz	Radio El Mundo	HRHH	
90.9 MHz	Radio Visión Honduras	HR--	
91.3 MHz	Estéreo Centro	HRRS	
91.7 MHz	Inter FM	HRQO	
92.1 MHz	radio la mia	HR--	
92.5 MHz	radio estéreo axion	HR--	SI
92.9 MHz	Estéreo Clase	HR--	
93.3 MHz	Musiquera	HRAX	
93.7 MHz	EstereoBNB	HROR	
94.1 MHz	Radio Nacional de Honduras	HRHH	
94.5 MHz			
94.9 MHz	Super 100	HRNQ	
95.3 MHz	HRN	HRN	
95.7 MHz	radio estéreo la joya	HR--	
96.1 MHz	Freedom FM	HR--	
96.5 MHz	Radio Satélite	HR--	
96.9 MHz	Universal	HR--	
97.3 MHz	Estrella	HRYT	
97.7 MHz	FM Fama	HRFH	
98.1 MHz	Radio Cadena Voces	HRZQ	
98.5 MHz	Radio Más	HRZS	
98.9 MHz	Radio La Picosa	HR--	
99.3 MHz	Radio América	HRLP	
99.7 MHz	Radioactiva	HRVV	
100.1 MHz	Estéreo Sula	HRYZ	SI
100.5 MHz	HCH Radio	HRMT	
100.9 MHz	Estereo F.E	HRFE	
101.3 MHz	Radio la Luz	HRVS	
101.7 MHz	Radio Pegajosa	HR--	
102.1 MHz	Radio Fabulosa	HRZV	
102.5 MHz	Radio Ambiental	HRXS	
102.9 MHz	Radio Latop	HR--	
103.3 MHz	Radio Progreso	HRPL	
103.7 MHz	Majestad	HRPV	
104.1 MHz	Tropicalisima	HR--	
104.5 MHz	Radio Globo	HRXH	
104.9 MHz	Radio Logo	HR--	
105.3 MHz	Stereo Doble U ciento-cinco Energía FM	HRAD	
105.7 MHz	Suave FM	HRNP	
106.1 MHz	VOX FM	HRTX	
106.5 MHz	Vida FM	HR--	
106.9 MHz	Q'Hubo FM	HR--	
107.3 MHz	Radio EquisYe Ciento-siete	HRNN5	
107.7 MHz	HRFW Estéreo Fiel	HRFW	

== Francisco Morazán ==
=== Tegucigalpa ===
Frequency	Name	Callsign	RDS
88.1 MHz	Stereo Éxitos	HRTG	SI
88.5 MHz	Radio Globo	HRXH	SI
88.9 MHz	RDS Radio	HRNX	NO
89.3 MHz	Power FM	HRSX	SI
89.7 MHz	Bbn Radio	HRWV	NO
90.1 MHz	Radio Visión Honduras	HR--	NO
90.5 MHz	Radio Estéreo EquisYe	HRNN5	SI
90.9 MHz	Kairos FM	HRWK	SI
91.3 MHz	HRVW Stereo Sur	HRVW	NO
91.7 MHz	La Buenísima	HRBM	NO
92.1 MHz	Rock n' Pop	HRUP3	SI
92.5 MHz	Radio la axion	HR--	SI
92.9 MHz	HRN	HRN	SI
93.3 MHz	Radio Cadena Voces	HRZQ	SI
93.7 MHz	Picosa MHz	HR--	SI
94.1 MHz	94 Su FM	HRCI	SI
94.5 MHz	Radio América	HRLP	SI
94.9 MHz	HCH Radio	HRMT	SI
95.3 MHz	Radio Estéreo la joya	HR--	SI
95.7 MHz	Panamericana	HRYW	NO
96.1 MHz	radio la mia	HR--	NO
96.5 MHz	La96FM	HR--	SI
96.9 MHz	Radio Universal 969	HR--	NO
97.3 MHz	Estéreo Tic-Tac	HRER	NO
97.7 MHz	Stereo Azul	HRRT	NO
98.1 MHz	La98	HR--	SI
98.5 MHz	Radio Más	HRZS	NO
98.9 MHz	Stereo Fe	HRFE	NO
99.3 MHz	Suprema Stereo	HRZW	NO
99.7 MHz	Radio Pegajosa	HR--	Si
100.1 MHz	Super 100	HRNQ	SI
100.5 MHz	Exa FM	HRHK	NO
100.9 MHz	Vertical FM	HRVT	SI
101.3 MHz	Radio Nacional Honduras	HRH	NO
101.7 MHz	Vox FM	HRTX	SI
102.1 MHz	Suyapa FM	HRVS	NO
102.5 MHz	Suave FM	HRNP	SI
102.9 MHz	FM 102.9	HRCJ	NO
103.3 MHz	HRCL Radio Progreso	HRCL	SI
103.7 MHz	Stereo Luz	HRJZ	NO
104.1 MHz	LHT FM	HRYK	NO
104.5 MHz	Radio Satélite	HR--	NO
104.9 MHz	Stereo Amor	HRZB	NO
105.3 MHz	Musiquera	HRAX	NO
105.7 MHz	HRVC	HRVC	NO
106.1 MHz	Romántica	HRWC	NO
106.5 MHz	Radio País	HR--	NO
106.9 MHz	Okey FM	HR--	NO
107.3 MHz	Doble u	HRWS	NO
107.7 MHz	La Top Music	HR--	SI

== Gracias a Dios ==
- HRLP Radio América 99.3 MHz

== Intibucá ==
Frequency	Name	Callsign	RDS
91.1 MHz	Musiquera	HRAX	NO
94.3 MHz	Radio América	HRLP	NO
96.7 MHz	Master	HR--	NO
99.9 MHz	Radio Compañía	HRWL	NO
100.3 MHz	Radio Guarajambala	HRZA	NO
101.5 MHz	HRN	HRN	NO
102.7 MHz	La Voz del Buen Pastor	HRMB	NO
103.5 MHz	Santa María Estéreo	HRSM	NO
103.9 MHz	Zelá Radio	HR--	NO
104.7 MHz	Ideal	HR--	NO
105.1 MHz	Imagen Radio	HR--	NO

== Islas de la Bahía ==
- HRSN Sun 107.1 MHz
- HRTA Blue Wave Radio 101.1 MHz

== La Paz ==
- Radio Marcala 90.3 MHz

== Ocotepeque ==
- HRAX Musiquera 100.3 MHz

== Yoro ==
Cadena Radial del Centro 102.9 F.M.
