= Juan Ángel Arias =

Supremo Director of Honduras

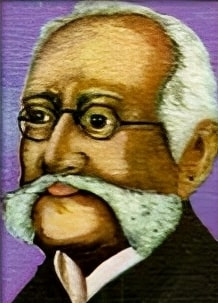

Juan Ángel Arias (1800–1842) served as the acting Supremo Director of Honduras (24 December 1829 – 22 April 1830).

When the general Francisco Morazán arrives to take possession as the Head of State, December 4, 1829, the people of the Olancho Department and Opoteca were in revolt against the central government of the Federal Republic of Central America. Morazán addressed a proclamation to the people of Honduras, which was the first document printed in the Gaceta del Gobierno before their campaign in Olancho. Morazán named Senator Juan Angel Arias his deputy, December 24, 1829. His time as head of state was dedicated it to submit reports on the pacificación de Olancho, highlighting the agreements with the factious, and the defeat of surveys led by the opotecan priest Antonio Rivas.

Juan Ángel Arias opened the first elementary school in Yoro. Juan Ángel Arias married Juana López. His son was Céleo Arias. Juan Ángel Arias, was killed in Quelapa, Honduras in March 1842.

Preceded by Francisco Morazán	President of Honduras; 1829–1830	Succeeded by Francisco Morazán
