= María Josefa Lastiri =

First Ldy of the Federal Republic of Central America

María Josefa Lastiri Lozano
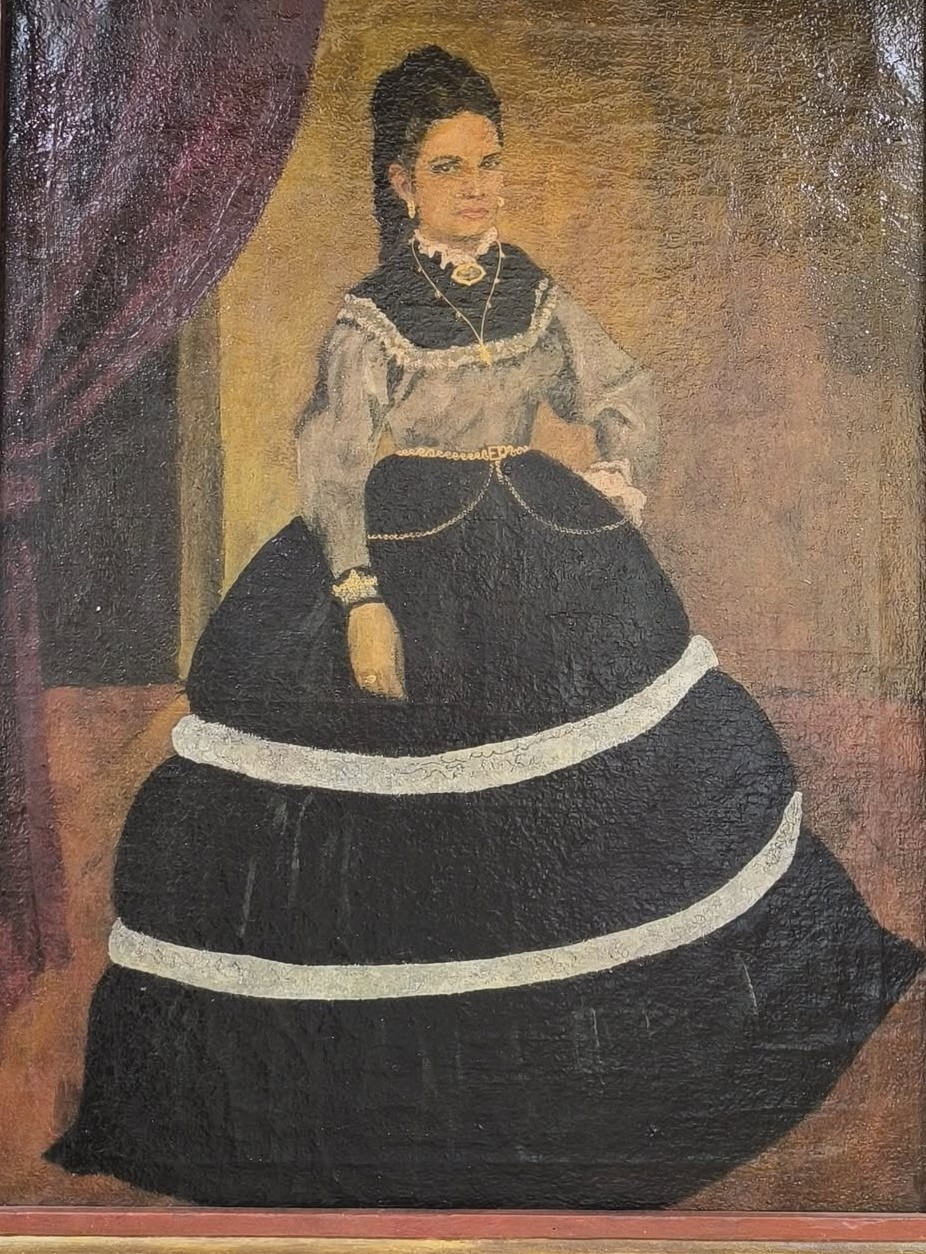
- Painting of Maria Lozano

First Lady of Honduras
- In role 27 January 1827 – 27 January 1830
- President: Francisco Morazán
- Preceded by: Joaquina Zelaya
- Succeeded by: Dolores Lozano

Personal details
- Born: October 20, 1792 Tegucigalpa, Honduras
- Died: 1846 (aged 54) San Salvador, El Salvador
- Spouse: Esteban Travieso (1818–1825) Francisco Morazán (1825–1842)
- Parent(s): Juan Miguel Lastiri and Margarita Lozano y Borjas
- Known for: First Lady of the Federal Republic of Central America, Honduras, El Salvador, and Costa Rica

María Josefa Lastiri Lozano (October 20, 1792 – 1846) was the wife of General Francisco Morazán and the First Lady of the Federal Republic of Central America, Honduras, El Salvador, and Costa Rica. She was born on October 20, 1792, to her parents Juan Miguel Lastiri and Margarita Lozano y Borjas in Tegucigalpa. Honduras. She first married landowner Esteban Travieso in 1818, with whom she had 4 children but he later died in 1825. Upon his death, she inherited a fortune. On December 30, 1825, she married Francisco Morazán in Comayagua, with whom she only had one daughter, Adela Morazán Lastiri.

She was First Lady of Honduras from 1827 to 1830, of the Federal Republic of Central America from 1830 to 1834 and from 1835 to 1839, and of the State of El Salvador from 1839 to 1840. She backed General Morazán's political and military activities, in which she lost the large capital her first husband inherited her at death. Due to the constant fighting and turmoil in El Salvador at the time, she left the country and sought asylum in Costa Rica. The Costa Rican government said it would grant the request if she and her family agreed to settle in the city of Esparza. Lastiri rejected the offer and instead went to Chiriquí, where she later met her husband. When Morazán took power in Costa Rica he immediately sent a boat to Chiriquí to pick up Lastiri and her family.

After Morazán's fall from power and execution in September 1842, Lastiri and her family left the country and returned to El Salvador. She died in San Salvador in 1846.
