= Nuevo Gualcho =

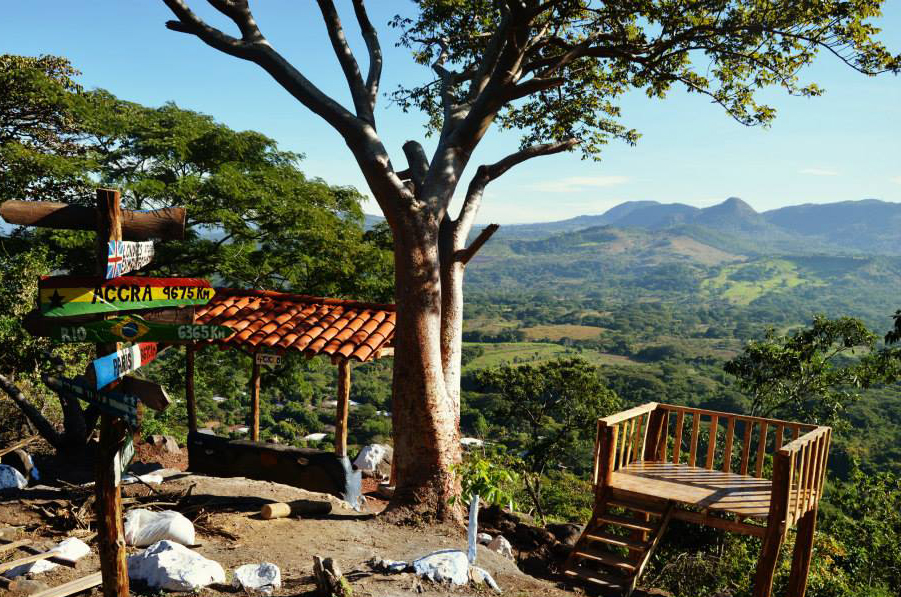
The Mirador - Nuevo Gualcho, El Salvador

Nuevo Gualcho is a small rural community located 8 km from Nueva Granada in the department of Usulután, El Salvador. The majority of its current inhabitants settled in 1990, having previously fled to bordering Honduras like many other Salvadoreans during the civil war. With around 200 families inhabiting the area currently, most make a living through farming and agriculture. In recent years Nuevo Gualcho has rapidly developed an Eco Tourism route including both natural and historical sites. This community initiative was enhanced by adding Bio-constructions such as a recycling centre, Artisan craft workshop and an access point and bench at the community’s main viewpoint, the Mirador.

== History ==
Although a relatively young community, Nuevo Gualcho is rich in history with both a physical reminder of the post-Colonial era in the form of the Hacienda, and very vivid memories of the civil war still held by many of the inhabitants.

== The Hacienda ==
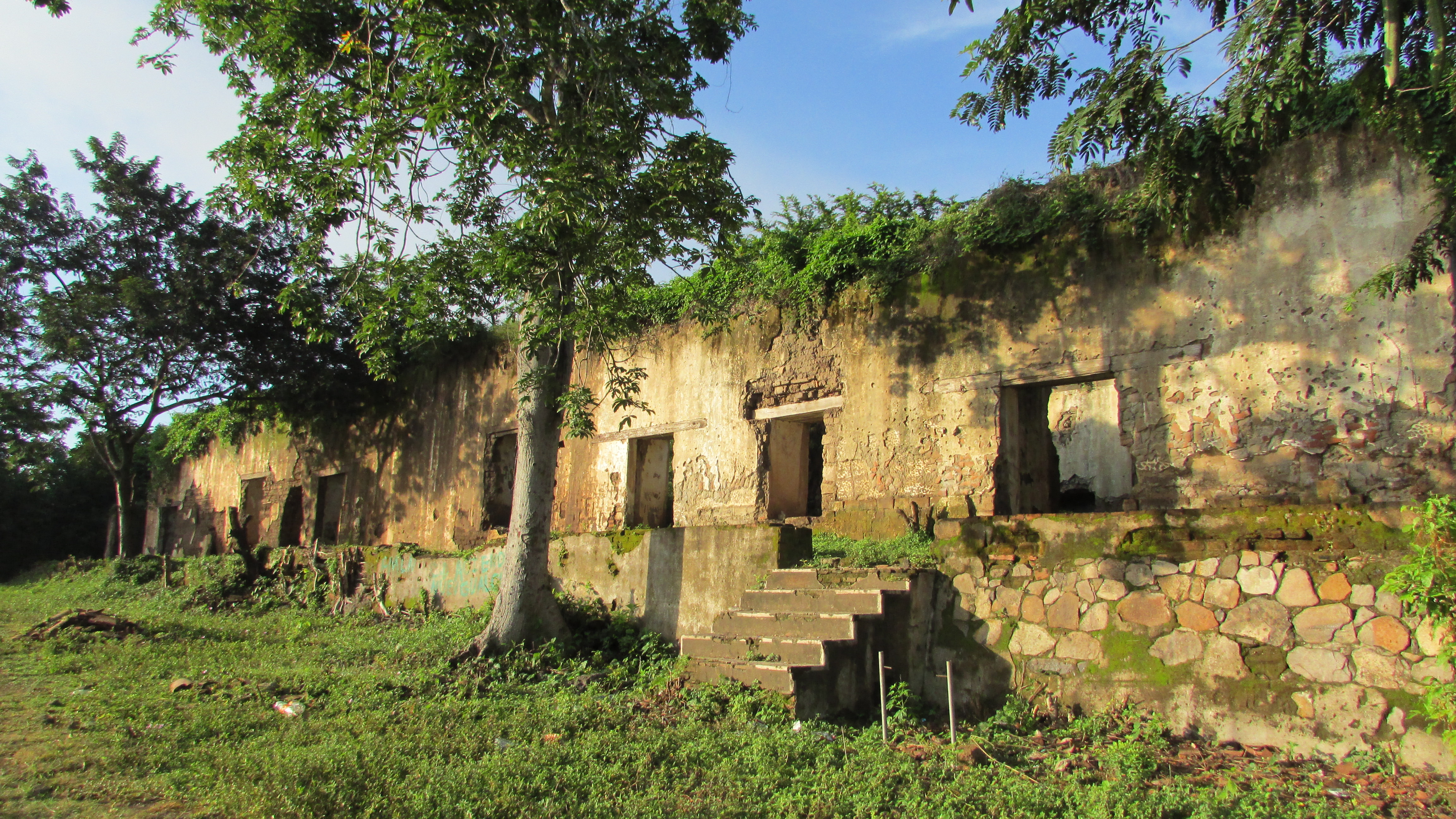
The Hacienda - Nuevo Gualcho, El Salvador

A focal point of the community, this site was used by Francisco Morazán as a base for battle during the fight for a unified Central America in 1828. He arrived here on the eve of 6 July 1828 having crossed the Río Lempa with Honduran resistance troops. Morazán was victorious in this battle and later went on to become President of the Federal Republic of Central America.

In the following years the Hacienda was unused for a long period of time and fell into disrepair, with extensive damage to the roof resulting from the 2001 earthquake, but ongoing action to restore and cut back foliage has since brought the site more clearly into view. With discussions currently underway to name it as a National Heritage Site, the Hacienda is a grand symbol of Salvadorean history and a reminder of Morazán’s victory.

== Resettlement ==
The brutal civil war drove many Salvadoreans – particularly rural farmers or ‘campesinos’ – out of El Salvador into the refugee camps of Honduras. In the year 1990, when violence was gradually decreasing, Nuevo Gualcho’s founding residents returned to El Salvador in search of a new home. A number of refugees had previously lived in the region and were aware of the rich soil and access to the Río Lempa. Some were survivors of massacres in rural villages and towns, and others had simply fled El Salvador to escape the civil war violence, and decided to seek an entirely new home. Travelling on foot, the first to arrive reached Nuevo Gualcho on 5 March 1990 and promptly began creating a new community. As such, the modern Nuevo Gualcho has been built almost entirely from scratch by this first generation to resettle, who lived communally within the Hacienda whilst constructing their homes. Today the majority of inhabitants work in agriculture in the local area.

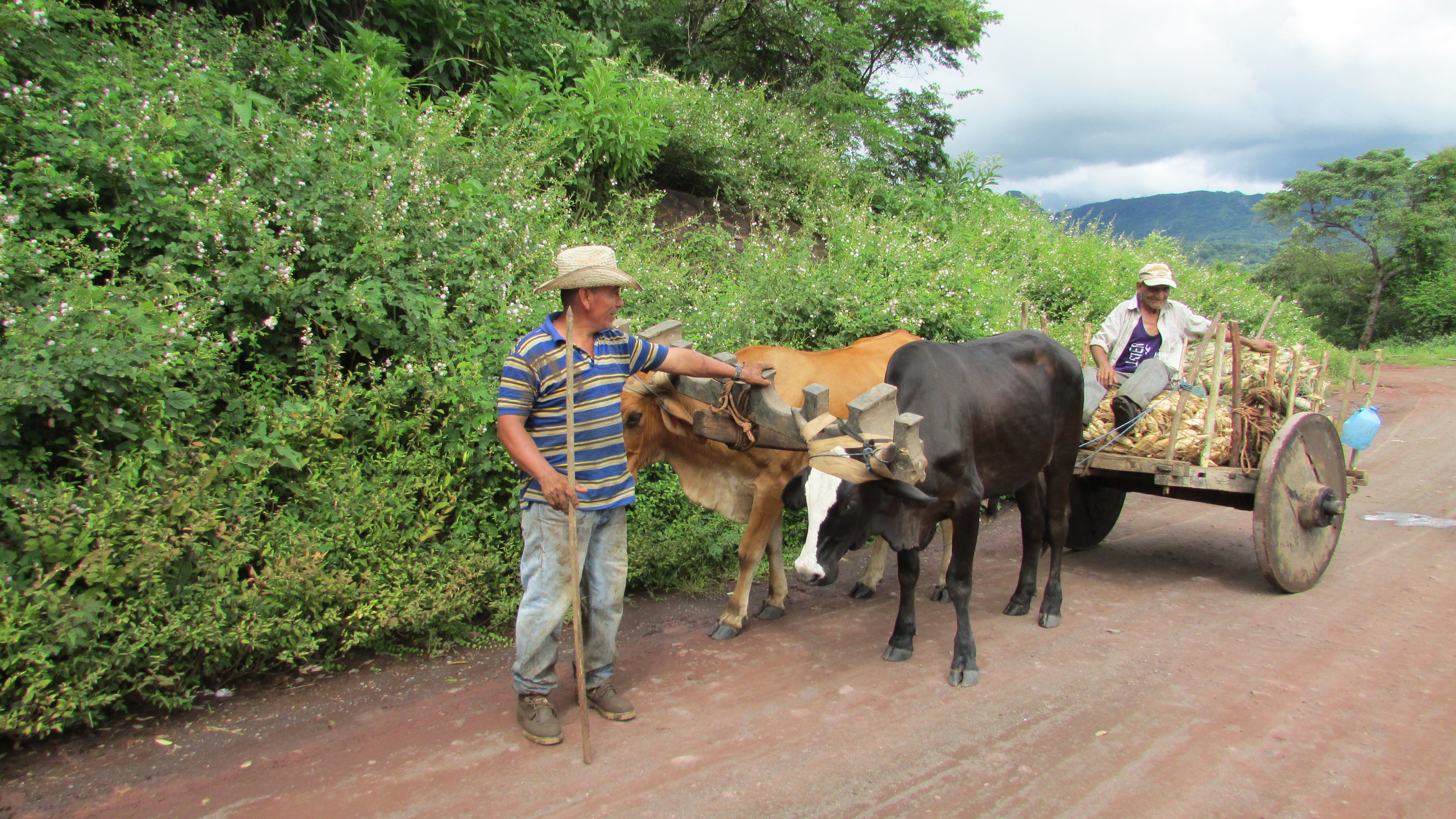
Community life - Nuevo Gualcho, El Salvador

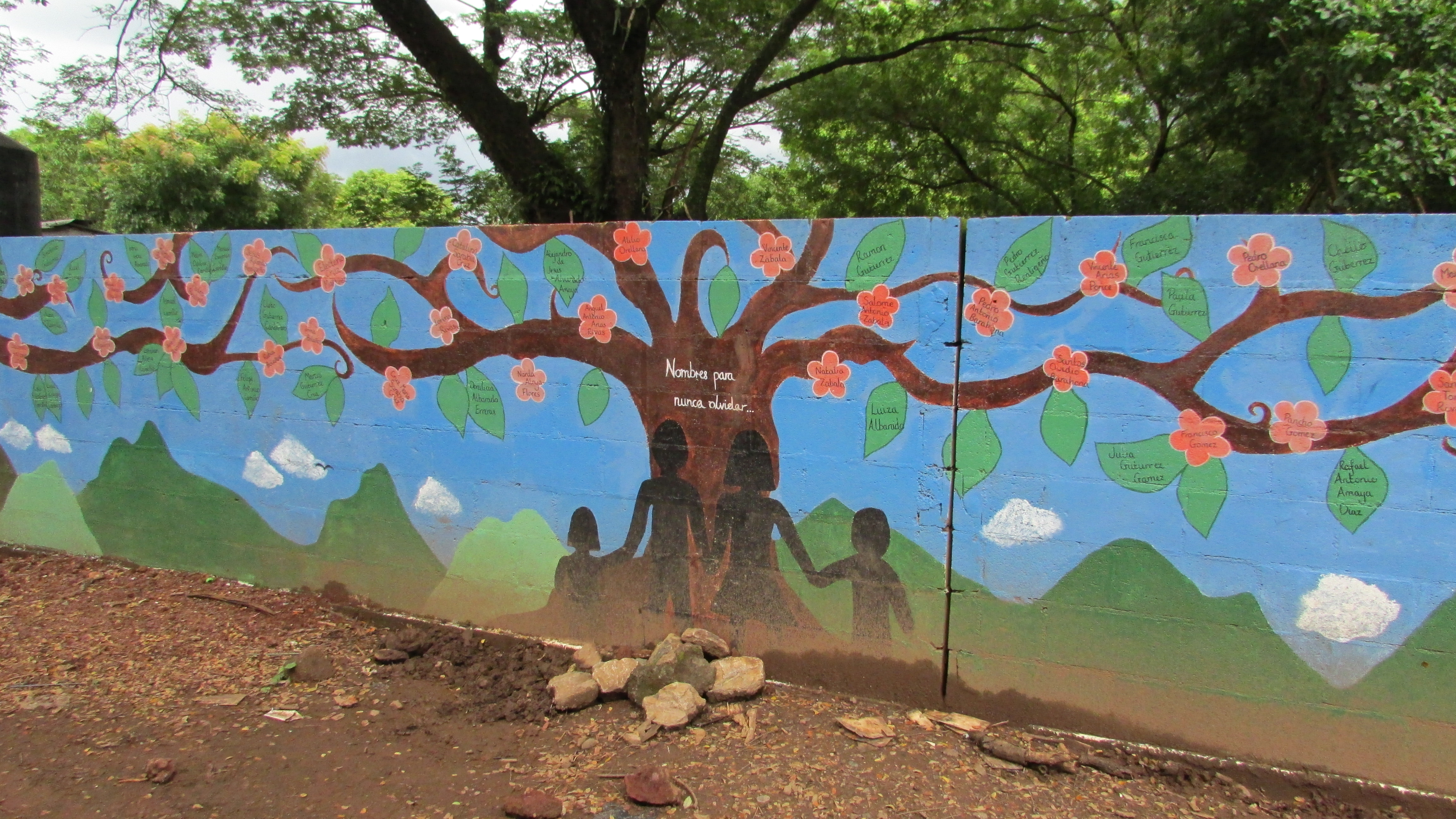
War memorial mural - Nuevo Gualcho, El Salvador

== Tourism ==
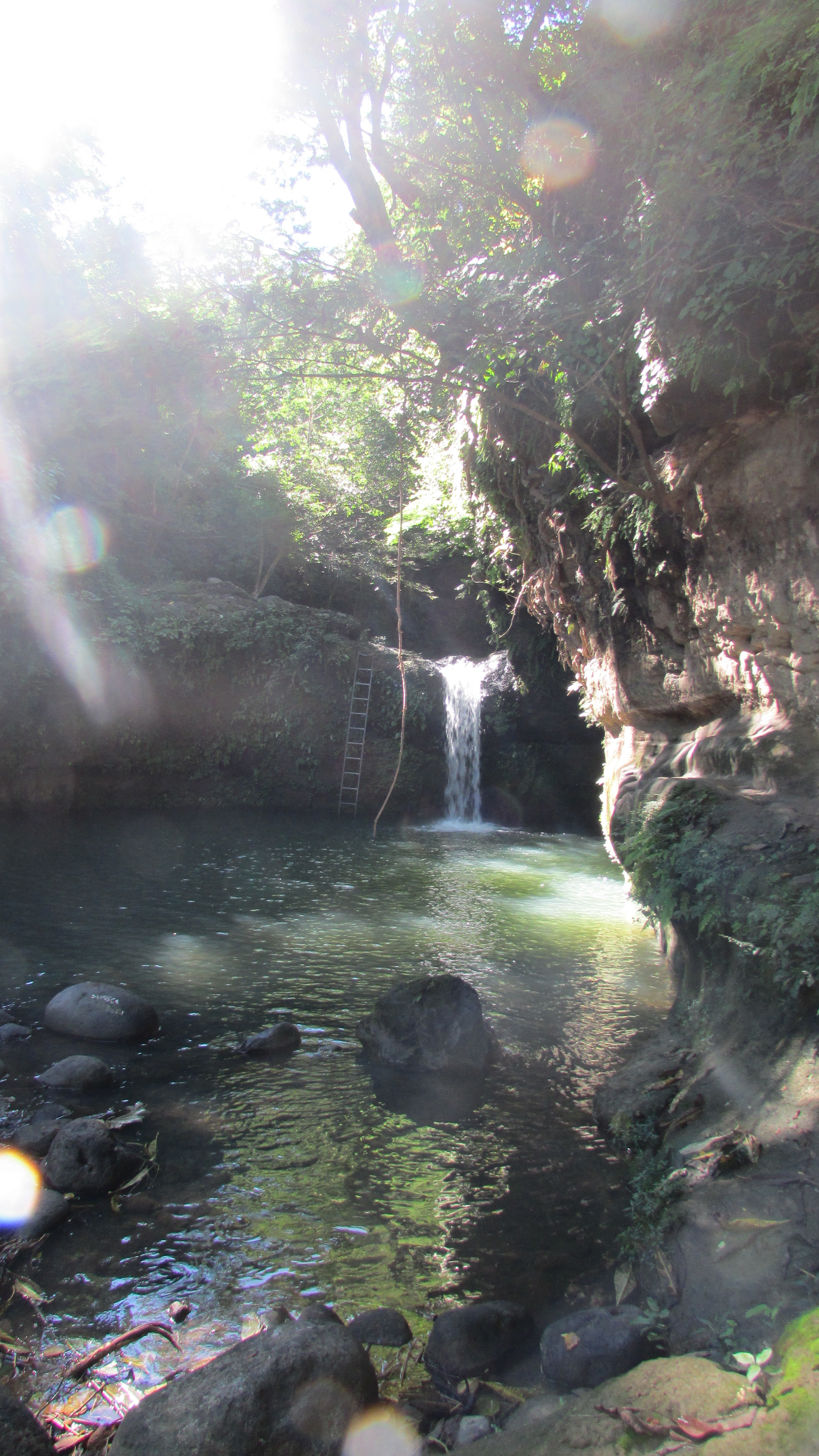
The Poza - Nuevo Gualcho, El Salvador

Recent efforts have been made to create an Eco Tourism route, which includes: the Mirador – a viewpoint from which one can see the Chaparrastique volcano and surrounding lakes and scenery, the Artisan centre – an Eco-construction where crafts workshops are held, the Hacienda site, the local church with both internal and surrounding murals, and the Poza – a natural pool lined by trees and complete with a swinging vine.

After noticing the tourism potential of Nuevo Gualcho, a British NGO invested a volunteer scheme in the area together with a Salvadorean counterpart NGO to help develop and prepare the community for an Eco Tourism route. Over 12 months the scheme has selected local youth and British volunteers to work on this initiative. Using Bio-Construction techniques a recycling centre, artisan workshop and a bench at the Mirador viewpoint have been built from recycled and natural materials. Stairs were built for access to the Poza, to cater for its many visitors, and local tours have been set up through a community initiative, with Nuevo Gualcho residents as guides to share their extensive local knowledge.
