= Mass media in Honduras =

The mass media in Honduras consist of several types of communications media: television, radio, cinema, newspapers, magazines and Internet-based websites. Honduras also has a growing music industry.

== Radio ==
Currently in Honduras, there are more than 800 active operators in the FM frequencies, and more than 200 active operators in the AM band. The predominant musical genres on the main radio stations are: rancheras and Mexican music (Musiquera), hip hop / urban (Radioactiva), news and talk (Radio Globo) and oldies (Estéreo Clase).

== Television ==
At least half of Honduran households have at least one television. Public television has a far smaller role than in most other countries.

== Motion pictures ==
Honduras has a growing industry that started in the 1950s.

The Mosquito Coast is an American drama about life in Honduras. El Espíritu de mi Mamá is a story of a young woman's journey back to Honduras to discover her roots.

Morazán is a 2017 Honduran film. It was selected as the Honduran entry for the Best Foreign Language Film at the 90th Academy Awards, but it was not nominated. It was the first time Honduras had sent a film for consideration for the Best Foreign Language film.

== Music ==
The Smithsonian collection of folk songs from Honduras is given here:

== Print media ==
=== Newspapers ===
All major metropolitan areas have their own local newspapers, for example the Newspapers in San Pedro Sula and Tegucigalpa.

=== Magazines ===
Honduras has various monthly news magazines including Hablemos Claro, Cromos, Diez, Click, Estilo, Amiga and Hablemos Claro Financiera.

There are also specialized magazines that serve the diverse interests and hobbies of the Honduran people. There are also some magazines published by professional organizations for their members, such as Revista Medica Hondureña.

== Internet ==
The Internet has provided a means for newspapers and other media organizations to deliver news and look up old news. Some organizations allow their archives to be freely browsed.

== See also ==
- Telecommunications in Honduras
