= .hn =

Top-level Internet domain for Honduras

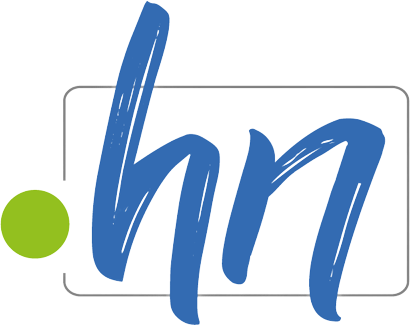
- Introduced: 16 April 1993
- TLD type: Country code top-level domain
- Status: Active
- Registry: Red de Desarrollo Sostenible Honduras
- Sponsor: Red de Desarrollo Sostenible Honduras
- Intended use: Entities connected with Honduras
- Actual use: Gets some use in Honduras
- Registration restrictions: None
- Structure: Registrations are directly at second level
- Documents: General policies
- Dispute policies: Conflict policy
- DNSSEC: yes
- Registry website: www.nic.hn punto.hn

Logo of NIC.hn

.hn is the Internet country code top-level domain (ccTLD) for Honduras.

== Second-level domain names ==
- .net.hn
- .org.hn
- .edu.hn
- .gob.hn
- .com.hn

== See also ==
- Internet in Honduras
