= Anolis morazani =

Conservation status
- Critically Endangered (IUCN 3.1)

Scientific classification
- Kingdom: Animalia
- Phylum: Chordata
- Class: Reptilia
- Order: Squamata
- Suborder: Iguania
- Family: Anolidae
- Genus: Anolis
- Species: A. morazani

Binomial name
- Anolis morazani Townsend & Wilson, 2009

Synonyms
- Norops morazani (Townsend & Wilson, 2009)

Species of lizard

Anolis morazani is a species of lizard in the family Dactyloidae. The species is endemic to Honduras.

== Etymology ==
The specific name, morazani, commemorates Central American statesman Francisco Morazán (1792–1842).

== Geographic distribution ==
Within Honduras, Anolis morazani is only found in Parque nacional Montaña de Yoro.

== Habitat ==
The preferred natural habitat of Anolis morazani is forest, at elevations of 1,780–2,150 m (5,840–7,050 ft).

== Behavior ==
Anolis morazani is terrestrial, living and foraging in the leaf litter of the forest, but it will climb onto low vegetation to sleep.

== Reproduction ==
Anolis morazani is oviparous.
