= Francisco Morazán =

President of Central America (1829, 1830–1834, 1835–1839)

General Francisco Morazán
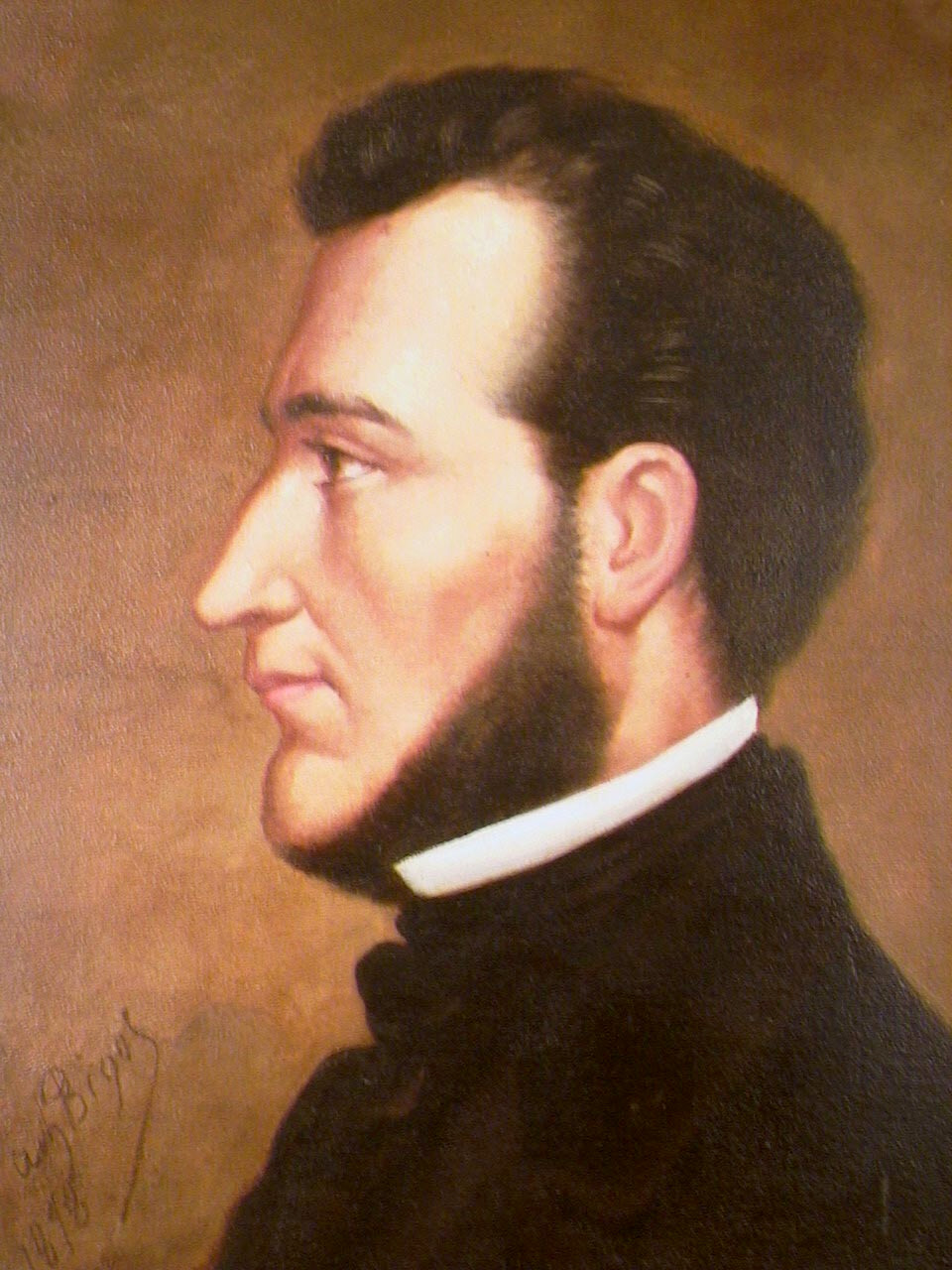
- Posthumous painting of Morazán, 1878

2nd President of Central America
- In office 14 February 1835 – 1 February 1839
- Preceded by: José Gregorio Salazar (Note: Interim officeholder)
- Succeeded by: Diego Vigil y Cocaña
- In office 16 September 1830 – 16 September 1834
- Vice President: Mariano Prado
- Preceded by: José Francisco Barrundia
- Succeeded by: José Gregorio Salazar
- In office 13 April 1829 – 25 June 1829; De facto President
- Preceded by: Mariano Beltranena y Llano
- Succeeded by: José Francisco Barrundia
Executive offices
7th Head of State of Costa Rica
In office 12 April 1842 – 12 September 1842
Deputy	Juan Mora Fernández
Preceded by	Braulio Carrillo Colina
Succeeded by	António Pinto Soares
10th Head of State of El Salvador
In office 11 July 1839 – 16 February 1840
Deputy	José María Silva
Preceded by	Antonio José Cañas (Note: Acting officeholder)
Succeeded by	José María Silva
In office 3 April 1832 – 13 May 1832; Provisional Head of State
Deputy	Joaquín de San Martín (Note: Provisional officeholder)
Preceded by	José María Cornejo
Succeeded by	Joaquín de San Martín
6th Head of State of Honduras
In office 22 April 1830 – 28 July 1830
Preceded by	Juan Ángel Arias
Succeeded by	José Santos del Valle
In office 2 December 1829 – 24 December 1829
Preceded by	Diego Vigil y Cocaña
Succeeded by	Juan Ángel Arias
In office 26 November 1827 – 30 June 1828; Provisional Head of State
Preceded by	Miguel Eusebio Bustamante
Succeeded by	Diego Vigil y Cocaña
Other offices
1st Minister General of Honduras
In office December 1824 – April 1826
Head of State	Dionisio de Herrera
Preceded by	Office established
Succeeded by	?

Personal details
- Born: José Francisco Morazán Quezada; 3 October 1792 (Note: Some sources incorrectly state that Morazán was born in 1799.) Tegucigalpa, Guatemala, New Spain (now Honduras)
- Died: 15 September 1842 (aged 49) San José, Costa Rica
- Cause of death: Execution by firing squad
- Resting place: Central American Garden, San Salvador, El Salvador; 13°41′49″N 89°11′31″W
- Party: Liberal
- Spouse: María Josefa Lastiri (m. 1825)
- Children: 2
- Occupation: Politician, military officer

Military service
- Allegiance: Central America; Costa Rica; Peru
- Years of service: 1821–1840, 1841–1842
- Rank: General
- Commands: Protective Allied Army of the Law
- Battles/wars: First Central American Civil War; Salvadoran campaign of 1832; Second Central American Civil War

José Francisco Morazán Quezada (3 October 1792 – 15 September 1842) was a Central American statesman, military officer, and caudillo who served as the president of the Federal Republic of Central America on three occasions between 1829 and 1839. He also served as the head of state of Honduras thrice between 1827 and 1830, the head of state of El Salvador twice in 1832 and 1839 to 1840, and the head of state of Costa Rica in 1842.

Born in Tegucigalpa, Morazán faced difficulties in obtaining an education due to a lack of available schools and due to his being born in the New World rather than on the Iberian Peninsula. He joined a militia in Tegucigalpa that opposed Central America's annexation to Mexico in 1821 as a lieutenant. He rose to prominence at the Battle of La Trinidad on 11 November 1827. Morazán then dominated the political and military scene of Central America until his execution in 1842. In the political arena, Francisco Morazán was recognized as a visionary and great thinker, as he attempted to transform Central America into one large and progressive nation. He enacted liberal reforms in the new Federal Republic of Central America, including freedom of the press, freedom of speech and freedom of religion. Morazán also limited church power by making marriage secular and abolishing government-aided tithing.

These reforms made him some powerful enemies, and his period of rule was marked by bitter infighting between liberals and conservatives. But through his military skills, Morazán was able to keep a firm grip on power until 1837, when the Federal Republic became irrevocably fractured. This was exploited by the conservative leaders, who rallied around the leadership of Rafael Carrera and in order to protect their own interests, ended up dividing Central America into five nations.

== Early life ==
=== Early years and education ===
José Francisco Morazán Quezada was born on 3 October 1792, in Tegucigalpa, then a part of the Captaincy General of Guatemala in New Spain. His parents were Eusebio Morazán, a criollo (a Spaniard born in the New World) from the Antilles, and Guadalupe Quezada, a Central American. Morazán's paternal ancestors were of Corsican descent and originally bore the surname Morazzani before changing to it Morazán, its Spanish form. His maternal ancestors belonged to the Quezada family, one of the most distinguished families of Tegucigalpa at the time. Morazán had three younger siblings: Marcelina, Cesárea, and Benito.

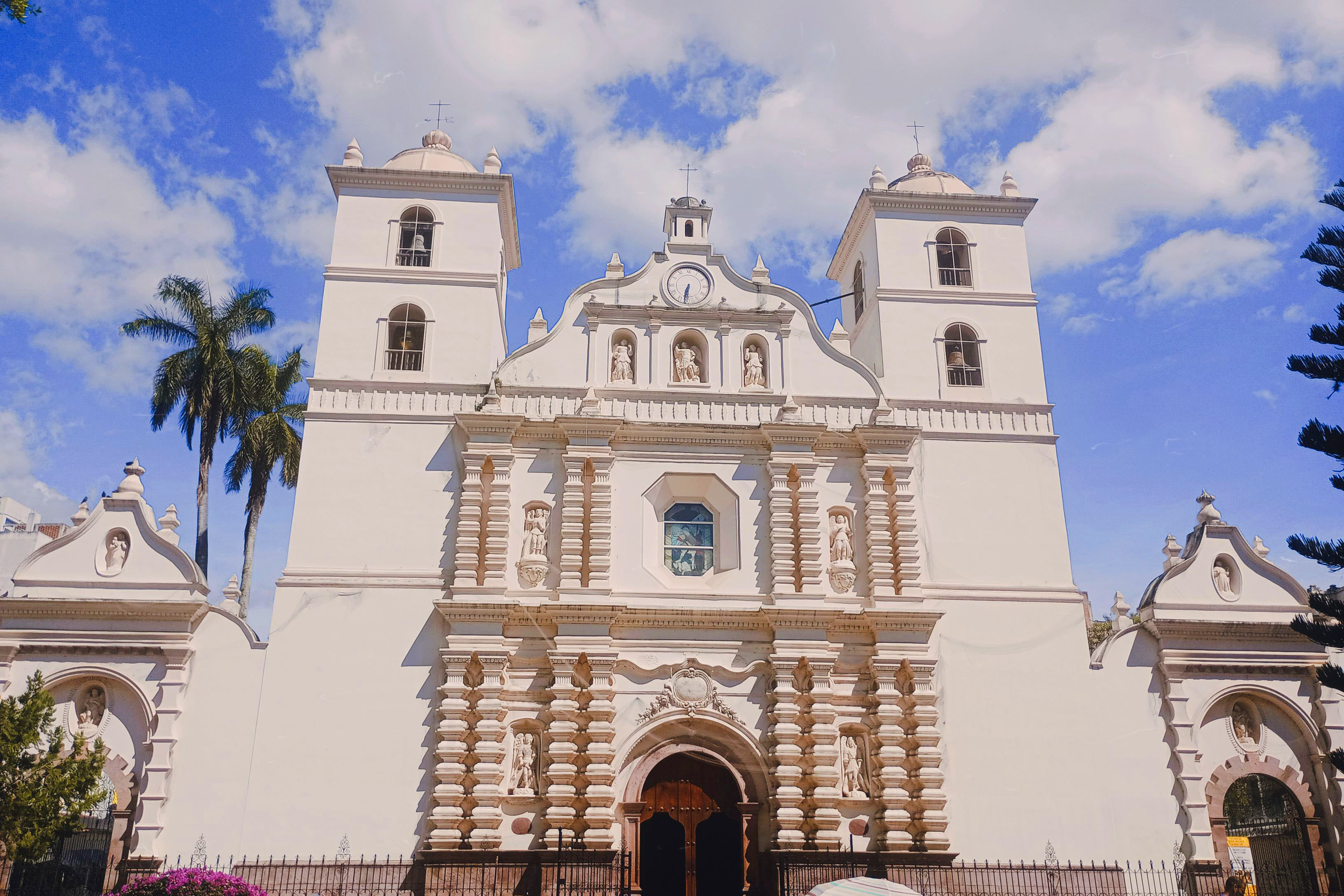
The St. Michael the Archangel Cathedral in Tegucigalpa where Morazán was baptized

Morazán was baptized on 16 October at the St. Michael the Archangel Cathedral in Tegucigalpa. Despite Morazán's mixed ancestry and status as a criollo, he was identified as Spanish on his baptismal certificate in order to avoid discrimination from the colonial casta system that blocked non-peninsulares (Spaniards born in the Iberian Peninsula) from attending universities or obtaining employment in law and science.

In Morazán's early years, he was educated in a private school that was funded by his parents as there were no other schools available. In 1804 at the age of twelve, Morazán attended a Latin school taught by priest José Antonio Murga. The following year, however, Murga was replaced by friar Andrés López, a peninsulare who opposed teaching Latin to criollos forcing Morazán to abandon his studies. For the rest of Morazán's education, he visited several convents hoping that its members would provide him with lessons. Morazán studied in mathematics, drawing, and law. At some point, Morazán worked at the notary office of Tegucigalpa. While working there, Morazán learned skills in jurisprudence and business administration.

=== Early military and political career ===
On 15 September 1821, Central America bloodlessly declared its independence from the Spanish Empire. Shortly after independence, however, the region's leaders were divided on whether to maintain their independence or to seek annexation to the First Mexican Empire. In Honduras, Comayagua supported annexation while Tegucigalpa opposed it. In late 1821, Morazán joined a militia in Tegucigalpa that opposed annexation. He held the rank of lieutenant and was the aide-de-camp to the militia's first battalion. In April 1822, Morazán was arrested by pro-annexation forces in the Comayagua valley while he was traveling to Gracias to prepare the city to recruit militiamen for the Tegucigalpa militia. He was released three days later and recruited 14 militiamen in Gracias.

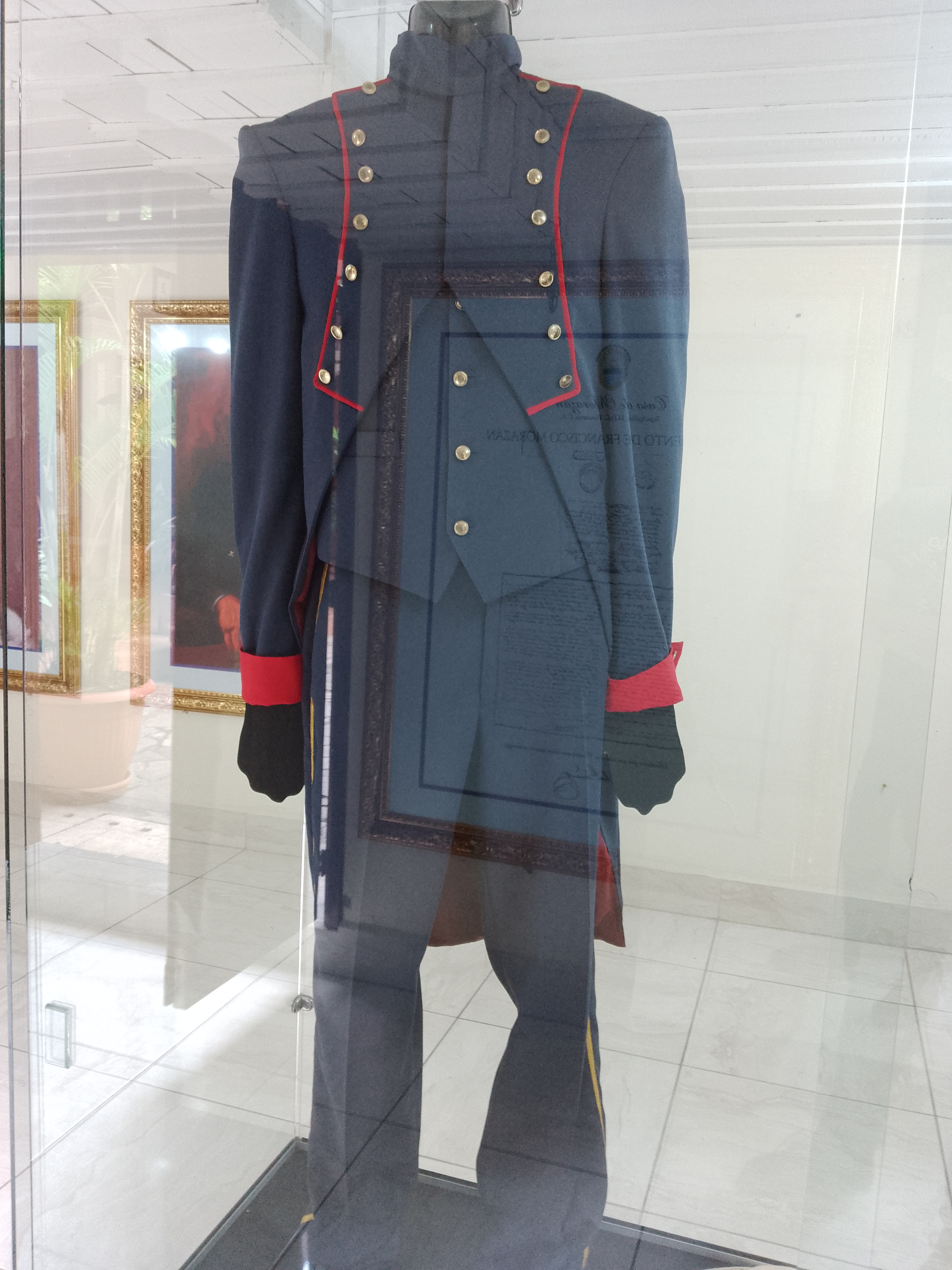
Morazán's 1830s military uniform on display at the Casa Morazán

Although Mexican military forces commanded by Brigadier Vicente Filísola were dispatched to the region to enforce its annexation, the overthrow of Mexican emperor Agustín de Iturbide in 1823 led Filísola to call for a congress of Central American leaders in Guatemala City to decide the region's future. On 1 July, the congress declared independence from Mexico and the establishment of the United Provinces of Central America, later renamed to the Federal Republic of Central America on 22 November 1824.

Dionisio de Herrera became Head of State of Honduras in December 1824 after being elected by the Honduran Constituent Assembly. Herrera appointed Morazán as Minister General. (Note: Herrera was initially hesitant to appoint Morazán as Minister General due to fears of accusations of nepotism as he was married to Morazán's cousin, Micaela Quezada. He ultimately decided to appoint Morazán following reassurance from the deputies of the Constituent Assembly that they approved of Morazán's appointment.) During Morazán's tenure, he helped Herrera combat several issues facing the state including a bankrupt treasury, a disorganized judiciary, and continued ideological tensions between Comayagua and Tegucigalpa, among others. On 11 December 1825, Morazán ratified the constitution of Honduras. In April 1826, Morazán was elected as a state councillor (equivalent of a senator) by the assembly and became the president of the council of state, upon which, he resigned as Minister General.

== Rise to power ==
=== First civil war ===
In 1826, the Federal Government headed by Manuel José Arce attempted to dissolve the federal congress and called a meeting to be held in Cojutepeque, on 10 October 1826, to elect an extraordinary congress. This unconstitutional move was rejected by the Honduran head of state, Dionisio de Herrera. But President Arce did not recognize Herrera's authority, claiming that Herrera's provisional mandate had expired, and that he was in power illegitimately. For this reason, the National Assembly had called for new elections in Honduras, but Herrera had ignored this decree and remained in power. For these reasons, but under the guise of protecting Copán's tobacco plantations owned by the federal government, Arce decided to oust Herrera. This mission was entrusted to colonel Justo Milla, who on 9 April 1827, commanded 200 men and seized Comayagua (the state capital) capturing Herrera and sending him to a Guatemalan prison.

While Milla was busy consolidating power in Comayagua, Morazán escaped from the federal troops. He left the besieged capital in the company of colonels Remigio Díaz and José Antonio Márquez, with the purpose of getting reinforcements in Tegucigalpa. Their plan was to return, and to liberate the state capital. Upon their return from Tegucigalpa, his men clashed with Milla's forces on the ranch 'La Maradiaga'. This confrontation, had no major consequences for either side; Milla remained in charge of Honduras, and Morazán left for Ojojona where he was captured and transferred to Tegucigalpa by order of Major Ramón Anguiano.

But Francisco Morazán managed to escape from his captors and left for La Unión, El Salvador, with the intention of emigrating to Mexico. In La Unión, he met Mariano Vidaurre, a special Salvadoran envoy to the government of Nicaragua. Vidaurre convinced him that, in that country, he could find the military support he needed to expel Milla from Honduran territory. He arrived in the city of León, Nicaragua, where he met with the commander-in-chief of the Nicaraguan armed forces, José Anacleto Ordóñez. For Morazán the meeting paid off; the Nicaraguan leader provided him with weapons and a contingent of 135 men. These men were joined by Colonel Zepeda's troops from El Salvador, and some columns of Honduran volunteers in Choluteca, Honduras.

When Justo Milla discovered the presence of Morazán in southern Honduras, he quickly moved his troops to Tegucigalpa, where he established his headquarters, meanwhile Morazán headed for Sabanagrande. At 9am on November 11, Morazán faced General Milla in the memorable battle of 'La Trinidad'. After five hours of intense fighting in a hill used by the Justo Milla forces, Morazan disguised a plan for attack at the flanks using the fresh and rested troops coming from El Salvador, at last moment the troop from El Salvador reached the hill and attacked the rear forces from Justo Milla, driving Milla's forces to the front shock army from Morazan. Milla's federal troops were crushed by Morazán's men. Milla and few of his officers survived and fled the scene of battle. Following this victory, Morazán marched to Comayagua where he was declared Honduras' new Chief of State.

Following his victory at 'La Trinidad', Morazán emerged as the leader of the liberal movement and his military skills became known throughout Central America. For these reasons, Morazán received calls for help from liberals in El Salvador. As in Honduras, Salvadorans opposed the new congressmen and other government officials elected by the decree issued on October 10, 1826. They demanded their restitution, but President Manuel Arce argued that this move was necessary to re-establish the constitutional order. El Salvador responded by attempting to take-over the federal government through military force. President Arce, however, defeated the Salvadoran army in Arrazola on March 23, 1828. He then ordered 2,000 federal troops under the command of General Manuel de Arzu to occupy El Salvador. This event marked the beginning of the civil war.

Francisco Morazán accepted the challenge. He placed Diego Vigil as Honduras's new head of state and left for Texiguat, where he prepared the Salvadoran campaign. In April 1828, Morazán headed to El Salvador with a force of 1,400 men. This group of militants, known as the "Army Protector of the Law", was composed of small groups of Hondurans, Nicaraguans, and Salvadorans, who brought their own tools of war; others had the support of Indians who served as infantry. Some volunteers continued his liberal convictions, others worked for a political leader, others simply hoped to get something for their efforts after the war ended. This was the combination of forces that joined Morazán in their fight against federal troops.

While the Salvadoran army battled the Federal forces in San Salvador, Morazán positioned himself in the eastern part of the state. On July 6, Morazán defeated Col. Vicente Dominguez's Federal troops at the 'El Gualcho' ranch in Nuevo Gualcho. In his memoirs, Morazán described the battle like this: "At 12 midnight I undertook my march... but the rain didn't let me turn the day, and I was forced to wait in El Gualcho.... At 3:00 a.m., the rain stopped, I put two companies of hunters on the hill overlooking to the left of the ranch.... At 5 o'clock I learned the position occupied by the enemy.... I could not go back under these circumstances.... It was no longer possible to continue the march, without serious danger, a vast plain and the very presence of the enemy. Less I could defend myself in the ranch, placed under a height of more than 200 feet.... It was therefore necessary to accept the battle with all the advantages reached by the enemy.... I ordered the hunters to advance over the enemy to stop their movement.... While the force rose by a slope and narrow path, fire broke out.... But 175 inexperienced soldiers made impotent for quarter of an hour, the repeated attacks by the bulk of the enemy. The enthusiasm that produced in all the soldiers the heroism of these brave Hondurans, exceeded the number of the enemy. When the action became general on both sides, our right wing was forced to back down. And occupied the light artillery that supported it. But the reserve working on that side, re-established our line, recovered the artillery and ended the action.... The Salvadorans assistants... arrived in time to pursue the dispersed..." enemy soldiers.

Morazán kept on fighting around San Miguel, defeating every platoon dispatched by General Arzu from San Salvador. This prompted Arzu to leave Col. Montufar in charge of San Salvador and personally deal with Morazán. When the 'liberal caudillo' learned about this, he left for Honduras to recruit more troops. On September 20, Gen. Arzu was along the Lempa River with 500 men in pursuit of Morazán, when he learned that his forces had capitulated in Mejicanos. In the meantime, Morazán returned to El Salvador with a respectable army. Arzu feigning illness returned to Guatemala, leaving his forces under the command of lieutenant colonel Antonio de Aycinena. The colonel and his troops then marched towards Honduran territory, when they were intercepted by Morazán's men in San Antonio. On October 9 Aycinena was forced to surrender. With the capitulation of San Antonio, El Salvador was finally free of federal troops. On 23 October, Morazán triumphantly entered the plaza of San Salvador. A few days later, he marched on Ahuachapán, to organize the army with which he intended to invade Guatemala.

=== Guatemala ===
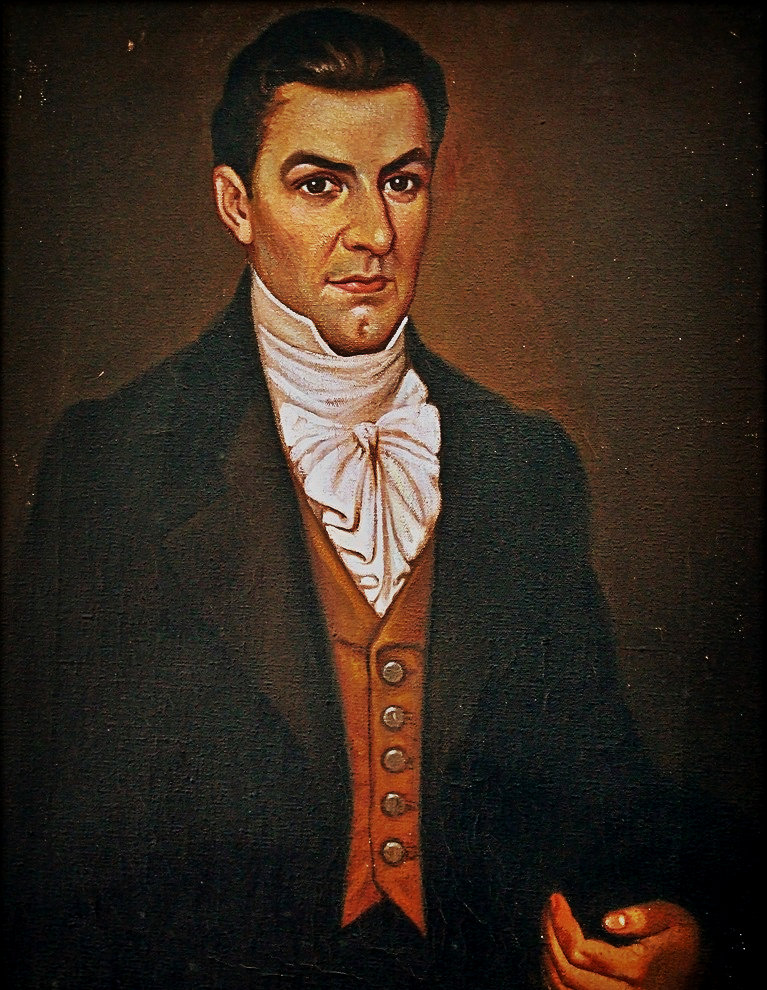
Manuel José Arce, the first president of Central America who was exiled by Morazán in 1828

In Ahuachapán Morazán made every effort to organize a large army. He asked the government of El Salvador to provide 4,000 men, but had to settle for 2,000. When he was in position to act in early 1829, he sent a division commanded by Juan Prem to enter Guatemalan territory and to take control of Chiquimula. The order was carried out by Prem in spite of the resistance offered by the enemy. Shortly after, Morazán placed a small force near Guatemala City under the command of Col. Gutierrez to force the enemy out of their trenches and to cause the defection of their troops. Col. Dominguez had left from Guatemala City with 600 infantrymen to attack Prem but he was informed about Gutierrez's small force. He changed his course of action and went after Gutierrez. This opportunity was seized by Prem who then moved from Zacapa and on to Dominguez's forces, defeating them on 15 January 1829. Prem then was ordered to march with 1400 men under his command to occupy the post of San José, near the capital city.

Meanwhile, the people of Antigua organized against the Guatemalan government and placed the department of Sacatepéquez under Morazán's protection. This prompted Morazán to invade Guatemala with his 'Protector Army of the law'. Morazán situated his men in the village of Pinula near the capital city. Military operations on the capital began with small skirmishes in front of government fortifications. On 15 February one of Morazán's largest divisions under the command of Cayetano de la Cerda was defeated in Mixco by federal troops. Due to this defeat Morazán lifted the siege of the city and concentrated his forces in Antigua. A strong division of federal troops followed him from the capital under the command of Col. Pacheco, heading towards Sumpango and Tejar with the purpose of attacking Morazán in Antigua. But Pacheco spread his forces, leaving some of them in Sumpango. When he went into San Miguelito with a smaller army, he was beaten by Morazán. This incident raised the morale of Morazán's men once again.

After the victory of San Miguelito, Morazán's army grew larger when Guatemalan volunteers joined his ranks. On March 15 when Morazán was on his way to occupy his former positions, he was intercepted by Col. Prado's Federal troops at the 'Las Charcas' ranch. Morazán, with a superior position, crushed Prado's army. The battlefield was left full of dead bodies, prisoners and weapons, and Morazán moved on to recover his former positions in Pinula and Aceytuno, and to put Guatemala City under siege again.

General Verveer, plenipotentiary minister of the king of the Netherlands to the Central America Federation, attempted to mediate between the Government under siege and Morazán, but they could not reach an agreement. Military operations continued, with great success for the allied army. On April 12, Guatemala's Chief of State, Mariano Aycinena, capitulated and the next day the Central Plaza was occupied by Morazán's troops. Immediately thereafter President Arce, Mariano Aycinena, Mariano Beltranena, and all the officials who had had some role in the war were sent to prison. After these events, the General ran the country dictatorially, until senator Juan Barrundia took over on 25 June 1829.

On 30 April 1829, the Guatemalan assembly bestowed Morazán a gold medal.

== Presidencies ==
=== Acting presidency, 1829 ===
After overthrowing the previous government of President Arce, Morazán ran the country dictatorially, until Barrundia took over on June 25, 1829.

=== First term, 1830–1834 ===
Francisco Morazán won the popular vote of the 1830 presidential election, against the conservative challenger José Cecilio del Valle. Mariano Prado was elected as his vice president. He was inaugurated on 16 September. In his inaugural speech he declared: "The sovereign people send me, to place myself, in the most dangerous of their destinies. I must obey and fulfill, the solemn oath that I have just rendered. I offer, to uphold the Federal Constitution, which I defended as a soldier and as a citizen."

With Morazán's as president and governors sponsored by him, the liberals had consolidated power. The General was now in position to advance his liberal reforms. Through them, he attempted to dismantle what he felt were archaic Spanish institutions, and to give to his people a society based upon general education, religious liberty and social and political equality. In 1831 Morazán and Governor Mariano Gálvez turned Guatemala into a testing ground for these 'enlightenment-like' policies. They oversaw the building of schools and roads, enacted free trade policies, invited foreign capital and immigrants, allowed secular marriage and divorce and freedom of speech, tried to make public lands available to the expanding cochineal economy, separated church from state, abolished tithes, proclaimed religious liberties, confiscated church property, suppressed religious orders, and removed education from church control, among other policies.

All of this new approved legislation struck a blow at the heart of the Guatemalan oligarchy. But more importantly, it stripped the Spanish clergy of their privileges, and curtailed their power. According to historian Mary Wilhelmine Williams: "The immediate reasons for the different enactments varied. Some laws were intended to protect the state from the clergy ... others aimed to help the recoup the public treasure, and at the same time sweep away aristocratic privilege; while still other legislation – especially that of latter date – was enacted for the punishment of opposition to earlier acts and of intrigues against the government" when Francisco Morazán first came to power. Back then, the General had to expel from the country archbishop Ramon Casaus and certain members of the monastic orders, because they were under suspicion of opposing independence. They used their influence against him and the Liberal Party during the civil war. They also had opposed the reforms, particularly those in the interest of general education which the Liberals were determined to push.

In March 1832, another conflict erupted in El Salvador. Chief of State, José María Cornejo had rebelled against some federal decrees, which prompted President Morazán to act. The commander in chief at the head of the Federal Troops marched on to El Salvador, where they defeated Cornejo's State Army on 14 March. On 28 March, Morazán had occupied San Salvador. From that point forward, rumors about the need to reform the constitution began.

=== Second term, 1835–1839 ===
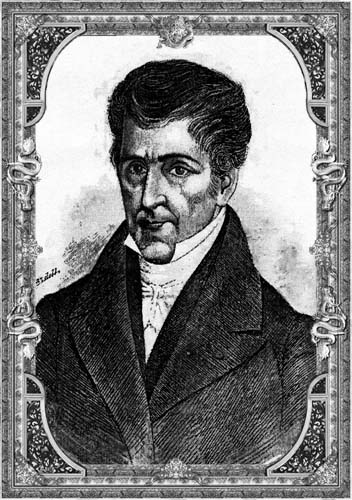
José Cecilio del Valle, who won the 1833 presidential election but died before he assumed office

In 1834 at the request of Governor, Mariano Galvez, the General moved the capital city to Sonsonate and later to San Salvador. The same year, the first four years of Francisco Morazán's presidency had ended. According to the constitution, elections needed to be held in order to elect the next president of the Republic. Moderate, José Cecilio del Valle ran against the incumbent president; for this reason, General Francisco Morazán deposited the presidency on General Gregorio Salazar, so the federal congress could verify the fairness of the election.

When all the votes were counted, del Valle had defeated Francisco Morazán. The Federal elections showed strong popular opposition to liberal reforms. Valle, however, died before taking office. Most historians agree that had he lived, he might have brought conciliation and harmony between the opposing forces (Liberals and Conservatives). On June 2, the Federal Congress called for new elections, which were won by Francisco Morazán. On 14 February 1835, General Morazán, was sworn as president for a second term.

=== End of the federation ===
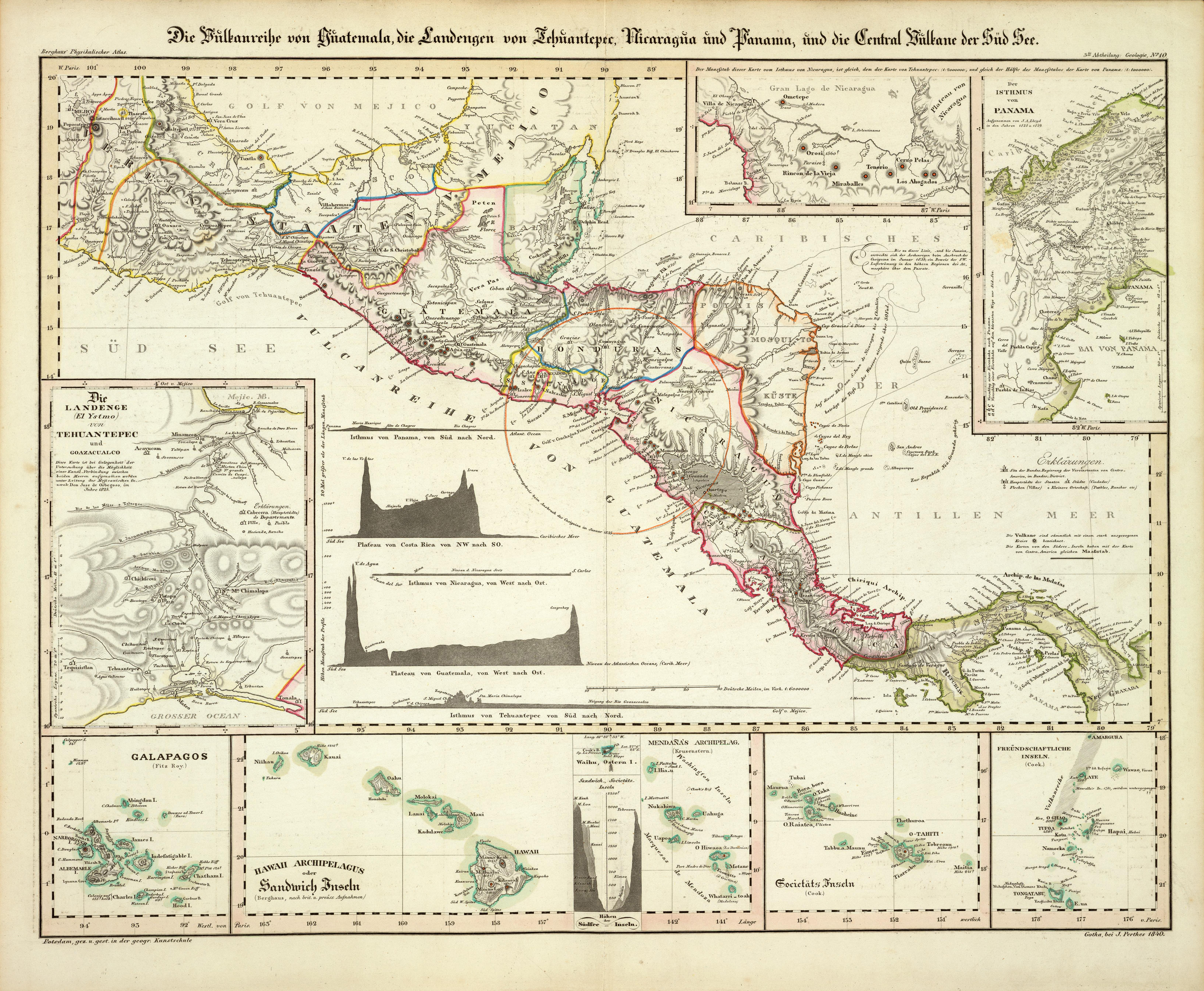
An 1840 map of the Federal Republic of Central America by German cartographer Heinrich Berghaus

In February 1837 there occurred in Central America a series of events that ignited a revolution that culminated with the fall of the Federation. An epidemic of cholera scourged Guatemala leaving approximately 1,000 people dead and 3,000 infected with the bacteria. The epidemic struck especially the poor and the Indians in the highlands of the state. At the time when it appeared, the Indians of the district of Mita, influenced by their priests, were much perturbed over the system of trial by jury (incomprehensible to them) which was being introduced. The disease spread rapidly and the government of Mariano Galvez, hoping to alleviate the situation, dispatched the available physicians, medical students and remedies for distribution. But these measures were of little help because the Indians continued to die.

The church viewed this as an opportunity to strike back at the liberal government of Mariano Gálvez. The local priests spread the rumor that the government had poisoned the rivers and streams for the purpose of wiping out the indigenous population, and repopulating it with foreigners. In proof, they pointed to a recent grant of territory in Vera Paz made to a British colonization company. A cry was then raised by the frantic Indians against their supposed murderers. As the cholera continued to spread the Indians took to arms, killed whites and liberals, burned their houses, and prepared to confront Galvez's government.

The governor sent an army to try to stop the revolt. But the army's measures were so repressive, that it only made matters worse. By June Santa Rosa erupted, and from the village of Mataquescuintla emerged a young Rafael Carrera. Carrera was an illiterate, but shrewd and charismatic swineherd turned highwayman, whom the rebels wanted as their leader. The priests proclaimed to the natives that he was their protecting angel Rafael, descended from the heavens to take vengeance on the heretics, Liberals and foreigners and to restore their ancient dominion. They devised various tricks to favor the delusion, which were heralded as miracles. A letter was let down from the roof of one of the churches, in the midst of a vast congregation of Indians, which was supposed to come from the Virgin Mary, commissioning Carrera to lead a revolt against the government.

Under cries of "Long live religion!", and "Death to foreigners!", Carrera and his forces initiated a war against the government. Encouraged by these events the conservatives joined in. The liberal government called General Morazán for help. Francisco Morazán repeatedly defeated Carrera's forces and pacified the state, but he could never catch the Indian leader, as he simply retreated to the mountains and came back to re-occupy the key positions as soon as Morazán's troops left.

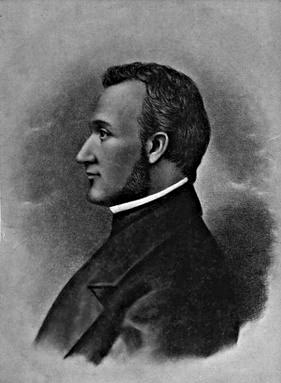
Drawing of Morazán by Frederich Van Dolvetz, 1838

By 1838 Morazán was presiding over a dying institution. Galvez had relinquished power, Congress tried to restore some life to the Federal Government by transferring control of their custom revenues. But Honduras, Nicaragua and Costa Rica opposed this move and used it as an opportunity to leave the union. The Federation was dead. On February 1, 1839, Morazán had completed his second constitutional term as president, congress had dissolved and there was no legal basis to name his successor. In the end a failure at compromise, the power of the church, bitter infighting between conservatives and liberals, and the quest for personal glory were the main reasons for the downfall of the 'Federation'.

== Chief of state ==
After Francisco Morazán's second term as President of the Federal Republic ended, he was left without political or military power. On 13 July 1839, however, the general was elected Chief of State of El Salvador. When Rafael Carrera and the Guatemalan conservatives learned about Morazán's new role, they declared war on El Salvador. Francisco Morazán personified the 'Old Federation' itself and for that reason alone they vowed to defeat him. On July 24, Guatemala and Nicaragua signed a treaty of alliance against Morazán's government. Carrera called on the Salvadoran people to rise against their government. These calls resulted in small uprisings within El Salvador, but these were quickly put down without much effort by Morazán.

When Carrera's attempt failed, Morazán's enemies formed an army of Nicaraguan and Honduran troops. On September 25, 1839, these forces invaded El Salvador and faced Morazán's army during the battle of San Pedro Perulapán. The general only needed 600 Salvadorans to defeat 2,000 men commanded by generals Francisco Ferrera, Nicolás de Espinosa, and Manuel Quijano. After their defeat, the humiliated generals and their troops fled to neighboring states, leaving behind over three hundred dead.

=== Defeat ===
On 18 March 1840 Morazán made a last attempt to restore the 'Union'. He gathered what he thought were enough Salvadoran forces to face Carrera, and with them marched to Guatemala. Once positioned, Morazán moved in from the south, striking towards the capital. Carrera pulled most of his own force out of the capital, leaving only a small, very visible garrison inside. Morazán jumped in, slaughtered much of the bait, then found himself assaulted from all directions by Carrera's main force of about 5,000 men.

The battle became notorious for its savagery and revealed the ruthless side of Carrera. whose Indians sang Salve Regina, and shouted "Long Live Carrera!", "Death to Morazán!" By the next morning, Morazán was running out of ammunition. He then ordered an increase in fire from three corners of the plaza, in order to attract attention, while he himself slipped out through the fourth corner of the plaza with a small escort, to escape back to El Salvador.

This time, the general did not have the support he needed from the common people, as he had had in 1830. The 'Liberal reforms' had not produced enough results for the citizenry; moreover, they resented some of these reforms. This was the case with the Livingston Code, which changed the system of taxation, among other reforms. As for the 'Liberals', they were too busy fighting among themselves that even former liberal president, José Francisco Barrundia had joined Rafael Carrera. Morazán's defeat was so decisive that on March 27, he deposited the headquarters of the State in the hands of director Antonio José Cañas and directed a proclamation to the people of El Salvador. Morazán did not want to cause any more problems for the Salvadorans. With Francisco Morazán's final defeat, the hopes of a Central American federation vanished.

== Exile in South America ==
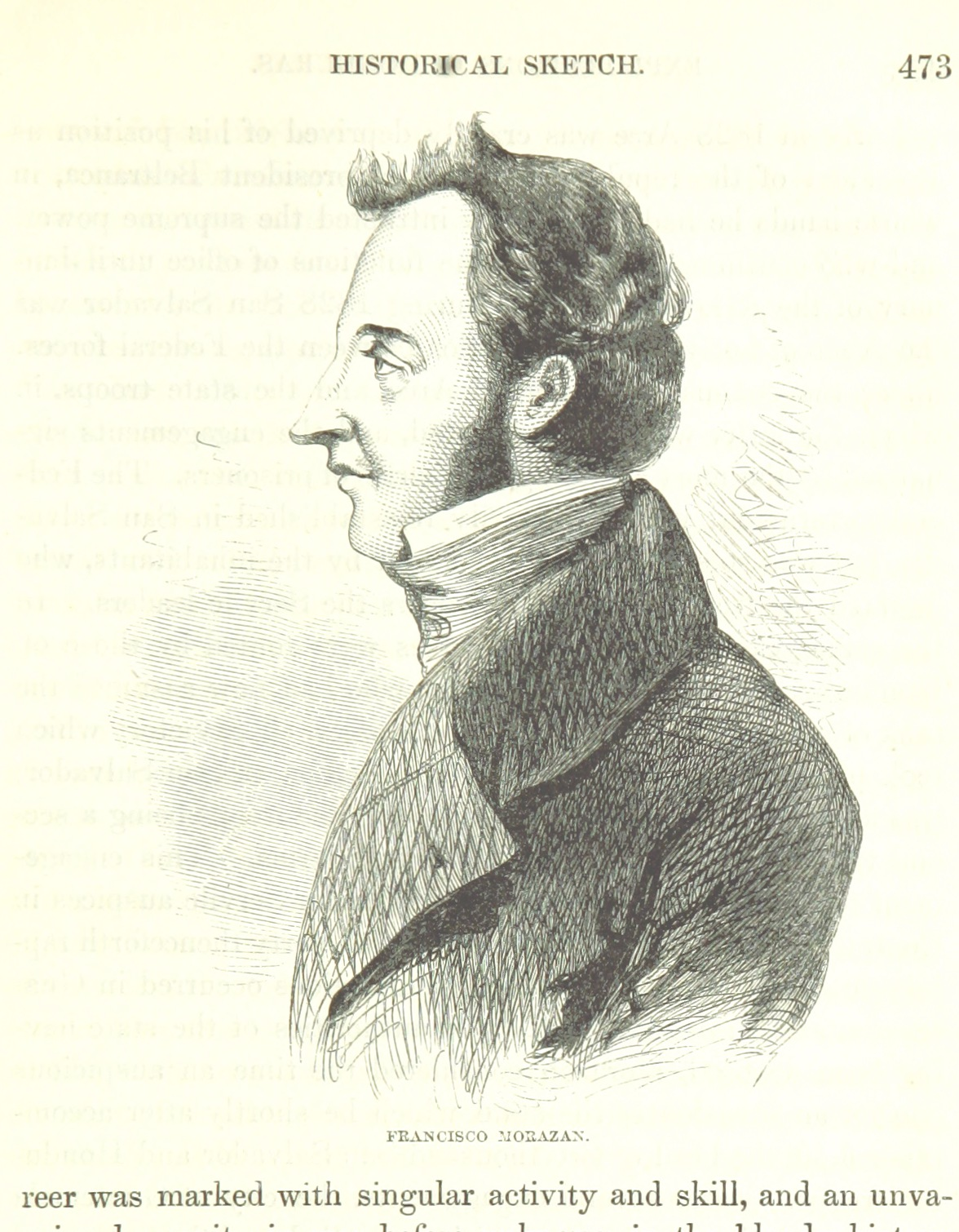
An 1857 posthumous sketch of Morazán by William Vincent Wells

On 8 April 1840, General Francisco Morazán went into exile. He left from the port of La Libertad in El Salvador, and embarked on the schooner Izalco accompanied by 30 of his closest friends and war veterans. He stopped in Puntarenas, Costa Rica where he secured political asylum for some of his followers. He settled in Panamá until 1841 when he traveled to Peru to serve in its army.

While in David, Morazán was informed by his friends of the fierce persecutions suffered by his supporters at the hands of Rafael Carrera and other Central American leaders. Outraged by this and by the chain of insults and slander against him by some members of the press, he wrote and published his famous 'Manifest of David' dated July 16, 1841.

While he was still in David, Morazán also received calls from his liberal colleagues in Costa Rica. Braulio Carrillo, governor of that state, had restricted individual liberties, placed limits on freedom of the press, and derogated the Political Constitution of 1825. He replaced it with a new constitutional charter, denominated "Law of Bases and Guarantees", where he declared himself 'Chief of State for Life'. Furthermore, Carrillo declared Costa Rica a free and independent state. However, Morazán wanted to stay away from Central America affairs, and travelled to Peru. Once in Lima, he received the invitation of Mariscal Agustín Gamarra to command a Peruvian division, at a time when his country was at war with Chile. But Morazán declined, because he found this war very confusing and troubling. Peru, Bolivia, Colombia and Chile were all involved in a twelve-year war, which brought about a train of baneful stages of chaos, among all countries involved.

In Peru, Morazán was fortunate to find good friends with whom he shared the same ideals. These included Generals José Rufino Echenique and Pedro Bermudez. Around 1841, the English began to intervene in the Mosquito territory, located between Honduras and Nicaragua. This intervention prompted Morazán to end his self-imposed Peruvian exile, and he decided that it was time to return to Central America. With the financial backing of General Pedro Bermudez, he departed from Callao on board the "Crusader" in late December 1841. On that trip he was accompanied by General Cabañas and Saravia, and five other officers. He and his companions made stops in Guayaquil, Ecuador and Chiriqui where he met with his family before returning to Central America.

=== Return ===
On 15 January 1842, Morazán arrived in El Salvador. He made himself available to the Central American leaders for the common defense against the British intervention. On 16 February 1842, he told his countrymen that his return was a "duty" and an "irresistible national sentiment", not only for him but for all "those who have a heart for their homeland." But his offers were rejected, nonetheless.

After this episode, he put forth a plan to overthrow Costa Rican head of State Braulio Carrillo. Carrillo, a reformer responsible for the expansion of coffee production in Costa Rica, had taken the first steps towards ending Costa Rica's political links with Central America.

In La Union, El Salvador, Morazán hired three boats. He then travelled to Acajutla, San Salvador and Sonsonate where he was able to reactivate the local forces. From Acajutla, he left for the island of Martin Perez, located on the Gulf of Fonseca. There he organized a military contingent of about 500 men. 7 On April and without any mishap, Morazán's fleet of five vessels landed at Port of Caldera in Costa Rica.

When Braulio Carrillo was informed of the presence of Morazán in Costa Rica, he organized a military force under the command of General Vicente Villasenor. On 9 April 1842, Morazán issued a proclamation to the people of Costa Rica in which he stated that he was never indifferent to the "misfortunes" of the Costa Rican people. "Your cries", he said, "have for a long time hurt my ears, and I finally found the means to save you, even at the expense of my own life".

Morazán avoided an armed confrontation with the forces sent by Carrillo. Through negotiations, in which he offered Villaseñor higher positions once the Federation was restored, he got him to betray his government. They signed "The Jocote Accord". This agreement provided for the integration of a single military body, the convening of a National Constituent Assembly, the ousting of Braulio Carrillo and other members of his administration, and the installation of a provisional government under the command of Francisco Morazán. On April 13, 1842, Morazán's forces entered the city of San José.

Thereafter Chief Carrillo was forced to accept the treaty. He approved it only when some modifications were added. He then turned the government over to Morazán and left the country. Morazán's first act was to open the doors of the state to Costa Rican and Central American political refugees. He then abolished the laws that Carrillo had imposed limiting trade and property, restored individual and political rights, devoted himself to urgent reforms, and convened the Constituent Assembly, which appointed him Supreme Chief of the Costa Rican State.

According to historian Gomez Carrillo, in the months that followed, Morazán concentrated on recruiting military personnel for the purpose of 'restoring the Central America motherland.' Thereafter, rumors of the possibility of war against the neighboring states spread. This troubled Costa Ricans; they feared Rafael Carrera would intervene in their affairs, specially after Guatemala broke ties with them. In addition they felt financially incapable of sustaining a war, and also considered it unnecessary. After all, the restoration of the 'Union' was a cause they didn't believe in. For all these reasons they decided to conspire against Morazán.

Morazán was one of only three presidents in Costa Rica history to have been a military officer while in office. (Note: The other two were General Tomás Guardia Gutiérrez (1870–1881) and General Próspero Fernández Oreamuno (1882–1885).)

=== Execution ===
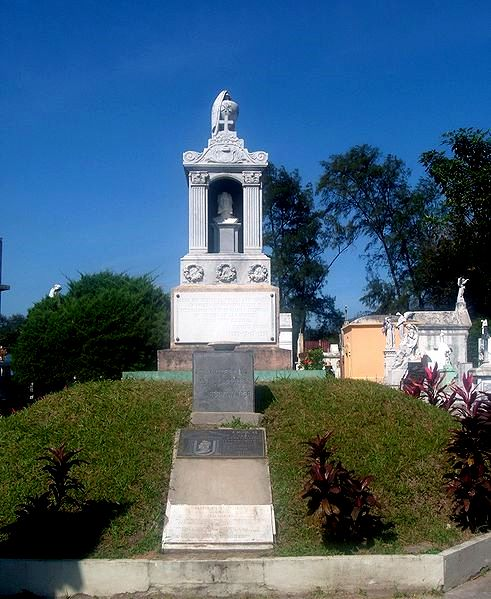
Morazán's previous tomb in the Cemetery of Distinguished Citizens in San Salvador, El Salvador

On 11 September 1842, a popular movement opposed to Morazán erupted in San José. Led by Portuguese General António Pinto Soares, 400 men attacked Morazán's guard of 40 Salvadorans. Morazán and his men managed to repel the attacks and retreat to their headquarters. The fighting continued bloody and relentless, and the insurgents increased to 1,000, while the number of the besieged diminished. Chaplain José Castro then proposed a capitulation to Morazán ensuring his life, but he refused. After 88 hours of fighting, Morazán and his closest collaborators resolved to break the siege. General José Cabañas with 30 men held the retreat, which made it possible for the others to flee towards Cartago.

But the insurrection had spread there too, so Morazán turned for help to his friend, Pedro Mayorga. But Mayorga betrayed him, and turned him over to his enemies along with generals, Vicente Villaseñor, José Saravia and José Trinidad Cabañas. Saravia committed suicide, Villaseñor attempted the same but survived. Subsequently, Morazán and Vicente Villaseñor were sentenced to death. On September 15, Morazán and Villaseñor were transferred to the central plaza in San José.

Before his execution, Morazán dictated his famous will to his son, Francisco. In it, he calls his death "murder" and declares, "I do not have enemies, nor the smaller resentment I take to the grave against my murderers, I forgive them and wish them the greatest good." When he was done, a chair was offered to him but he refused it. Seated next to him was Gen. Villaseñor, sedated and almost unconscious. Morazán then said, "Dear friend, posterity will do us justice" and crossed himself. A few minutes later, Morazán himself commanded the firing squad that ended his life and that of Villaseñor.

Morazán's remains being relocated in 2026

Morazán was exhumed by the Costa Rican government in 1848 and his remains were repatriated to El Salvador the following year. The Salvadoran government under Captain General Gerardo Barrios gave him an official burial ceremony in 1859. Morazán was buried in the Cemetery of Distinguished Citizens in San Salvador. In 2026, his remains were relocated to a mausoleum in the Central American Garden in Historic Downtown San Salvador.

== Personal life ==
=== Political beliefs ===
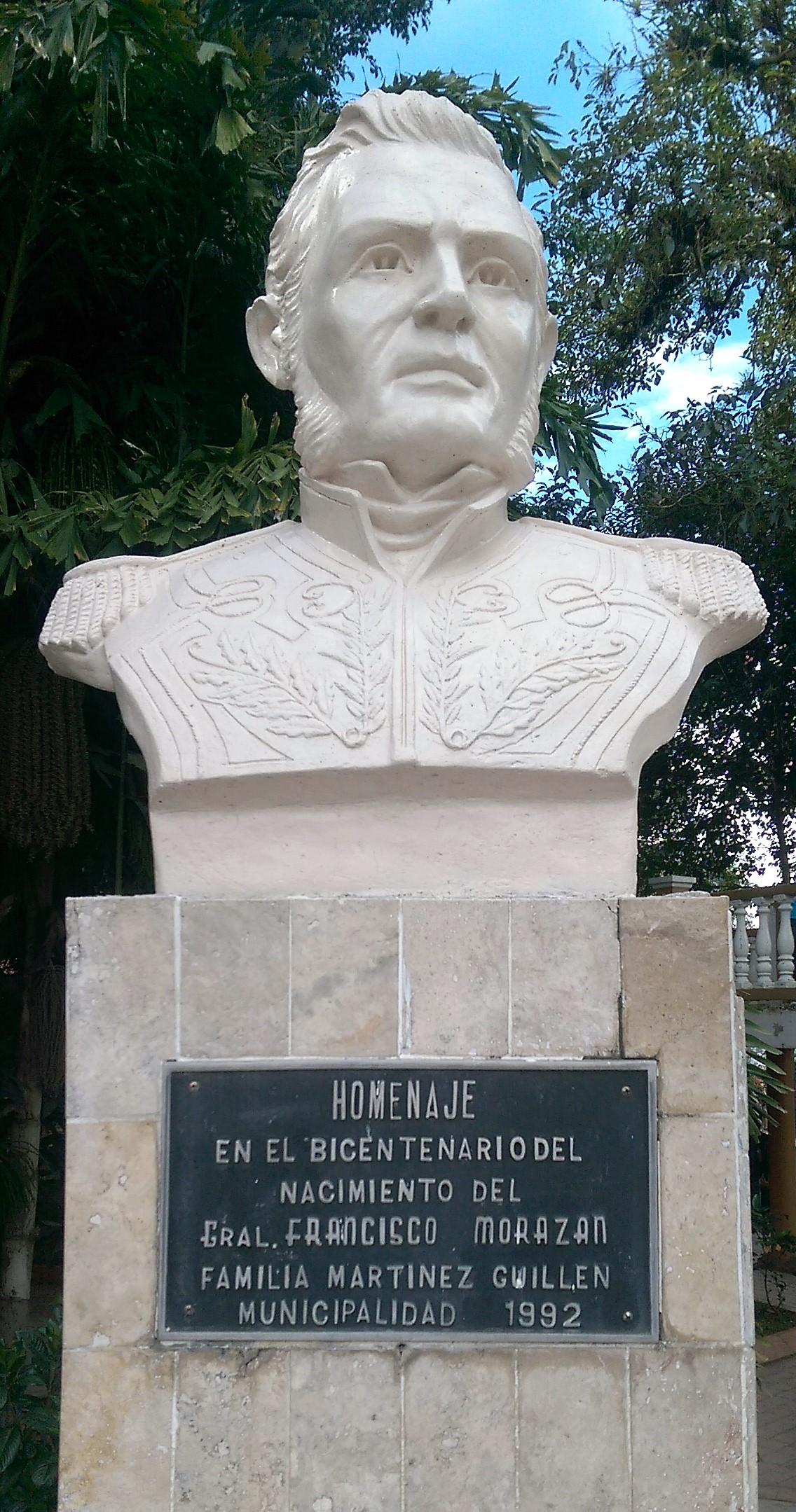
Bust of Morazán in Marcala, Honduras commemorating the bicentennial of his birth

Morazán was a liberal and a member of the Central American liberal party. Morazán supported federalism and opposed the existence of a centralized government headquartered in Guatemala.

=== Marriage and family ===
Morazán married María Josefa Lastiri, a widow, on 30 December 1825. The couple had a daughter named Adela. Lastiri belonged to one of the wealthiest families in province of Honduras. Her father was the Spanish trader Juan Miguel Lastiri, who played an important part in the commercial development of Tegucigalpa. Her mother was Margarita Lozano, member of a powerful criollo family in the city.

Outside his marriage, Francisco Morazán fathered a son, Francisco Morazán Moncada, who was born on October 4, 1827, to Francisca Moncada, daughter of a well-known Nicaraguan politician named Liberato Moncada. Francisco Morazán Junior lived in the Morazán-Lastiri home and accompanied his father in Guatemala, El Salvador, Panama, Peru and finally in Costa Rica, where his father was executed. After the death of his father, Francisco Morazán Moncada settled in Chinandega, Nicaragua where he devoted himself to farming. He died in 1904 at age 77.

Morazán also had an adoptive son named José Antonio Ruiz. He was the legitimate son of Eusebio Ruiz and the Guatemalan lady Rita Zelayandía, who handed her son to General Morazán when he was 14 years old. José Antonio accompanied his adoptive father on military actions and became a brigadier general. He died in Tegucigalpa in 1883.

== Politics and the failed federation ==
More than a man of ideas, Morazán was a man of action wrote biographer Rafael Eliodoro Valle. But his name cannot fail to brighten the history of ideas in Central America, because he knew how to instill in them; the power of his sincerity, the passion that inflamed him, and his faith in the future, like men of vision who always think big. Francisco Morazán pushed with his liberal and progressive ideas a series of revolutionary measures for the time. Thus, promoting education, immigration, established freedom of worship and the press. The first federal administration headed by Morazán was oriented to the peaceful reconstruction of the several States that comprised the republic.

According to writer, David Alejandro Luna, one of Morazán's biggest mistakes was to not design a plan to break the feudal estates where his secular enemies were sitting ... Morazán's fight was marred of romanticism, his strategic line tended to politically displace the oppressive aristocratic landowners of Central America, his tactics, however, disagreed with the political reality. Despite the strenuous efforts made by General Francisco Morazán from the presidency of the Republic. The clerical and aristocratic forces staged a strong anti-liberal building block taking advantage of the fanaticism and discontent that permeated large sections of the population, especially in the state of Guatemala.

== Legacy ==
=== Historical assessment ===
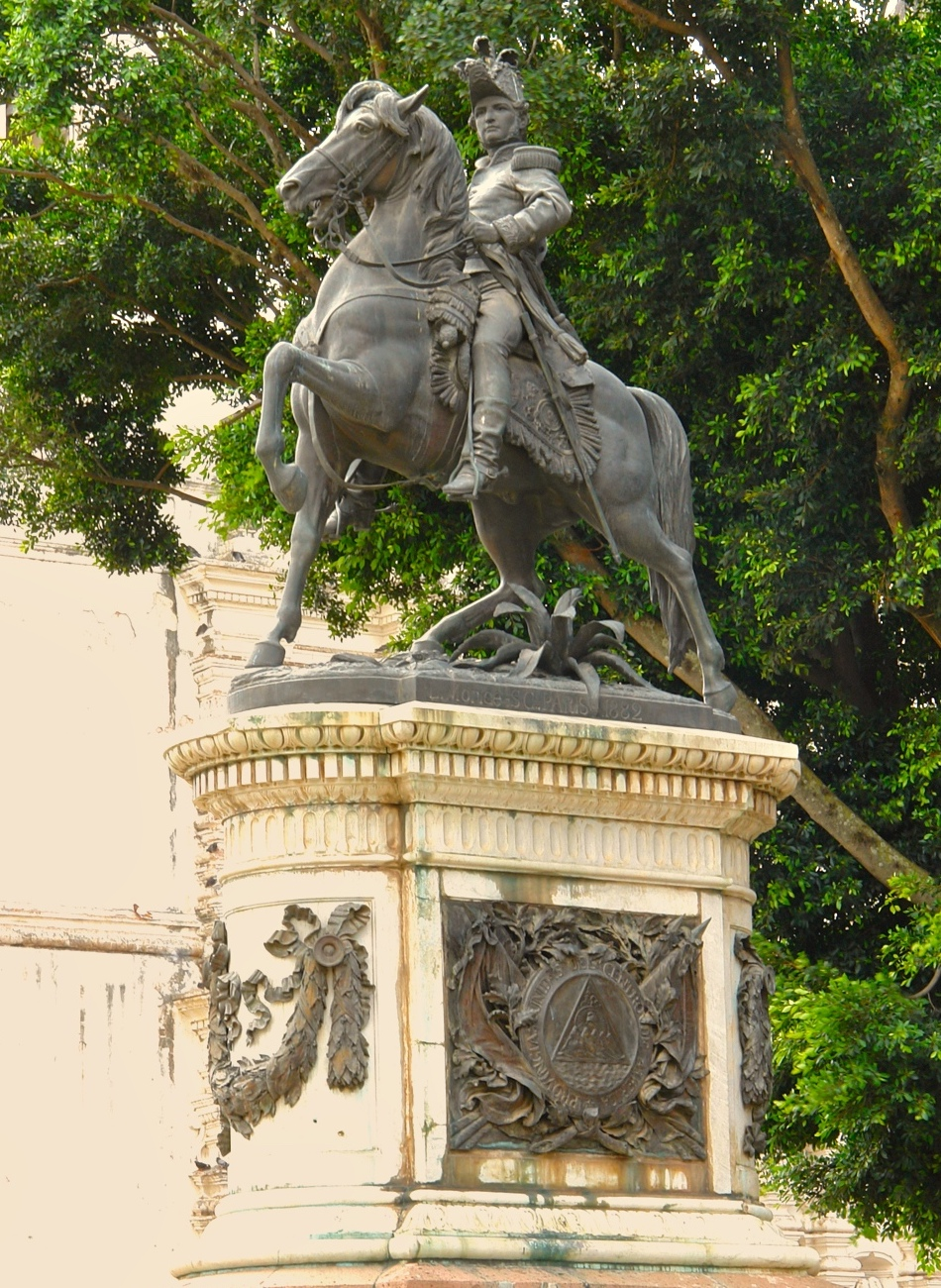
An equestrian statute of Morazán in Tegucigalpa, Honduras

At the time of Morazán's death, he was widely seen as a tyrant and enemy across Central America largely due to Carrera's popularity. In conservative colonel Manuel Montúfar's memoir Memorias de Jalapa, he promoted unfounded allegations that Morazán had engaged in forgery and abuse of power while working at the Tegucigalpa notary office. Honduran priest and poet José Trinidad Reyes openly attacked Morazán's personal life in his writings.

Although conservatives sought to degrade Morazán's reputation, he became widely revered as a Central America hero by the 1880s. This was largely due to Central American liberals continuing to revere Morazán and liberal governments openly associating themselves with Morazán to the extent that a posthumous cult of personality formed around Morazán. The centenary of his birth in 1892 was celebrated across the region.

Several historians who wrote biographies of Morazán praised him for exhibiting abundant leadership qualities. According to Federal Research Division editor Tim L. Merril, Morazán was nicknamed the "George Washington of Central America". Morazán has been similarly compared to other historical figures such as Simón Bolívar, Napoleon Bonaparte, and Giuseppe Garibaldi.

=== Portrayal in media ===
"Bolívar's shadow, that dreamed that South America would be one nation... and Morazán's shadow, embedding in its triumphant sword the five republics of Central America." (Note: "Spanish: La sombra de Bolívar, que soñó para la América del Sur una sola nación... y la sombra de Morazán, incrustando en su espada triunfante las cinco repúblicas de la América del Centro.")

— José Martí, 19th century

With his death, the nation lost a man described by José Martí as "a powerful genius, a strategist, a speaker, a true statesman, perhaps the only one Central America has ever produced".

The first recorded play in Salvadoran history is The Tragedy of Morazán (1852) by playwright Francisco Díaz that dramatizes Morazán's life. The Cultural Institute in Honduras was inaugurated with a performance of the 1916 play The Conspirators, also about Morazán. In 1950, Chilean poet Pablo Neruda wrote a poem dedicated to Morazán in his book Canto General.

=== Political appropriations ===
Several attempts were made to reunite Central America throughout the late 19th and early 20th centuries. Many reunification efforts invoked Morazán's memory to promote regional unionism. No attempt was successful. Beginning in the 1930s, the militaries across Central America began appropriating Morazán's image to legitimize their military dictatorships. Central American governments continued this appropriation during World War II and promoted a sort of warrior myth about Morazán at the centenary of his death in 1942.

Honduran leftist militant groups such as the Morazanist Patriotic Front (FPM) and the Morazanist Front for the Liberation of Honduras (FMLH) were named after Morazán. The National Popular Resistance Front (FNRP) depicts Morazán on its flag.

=== Commemoration ===
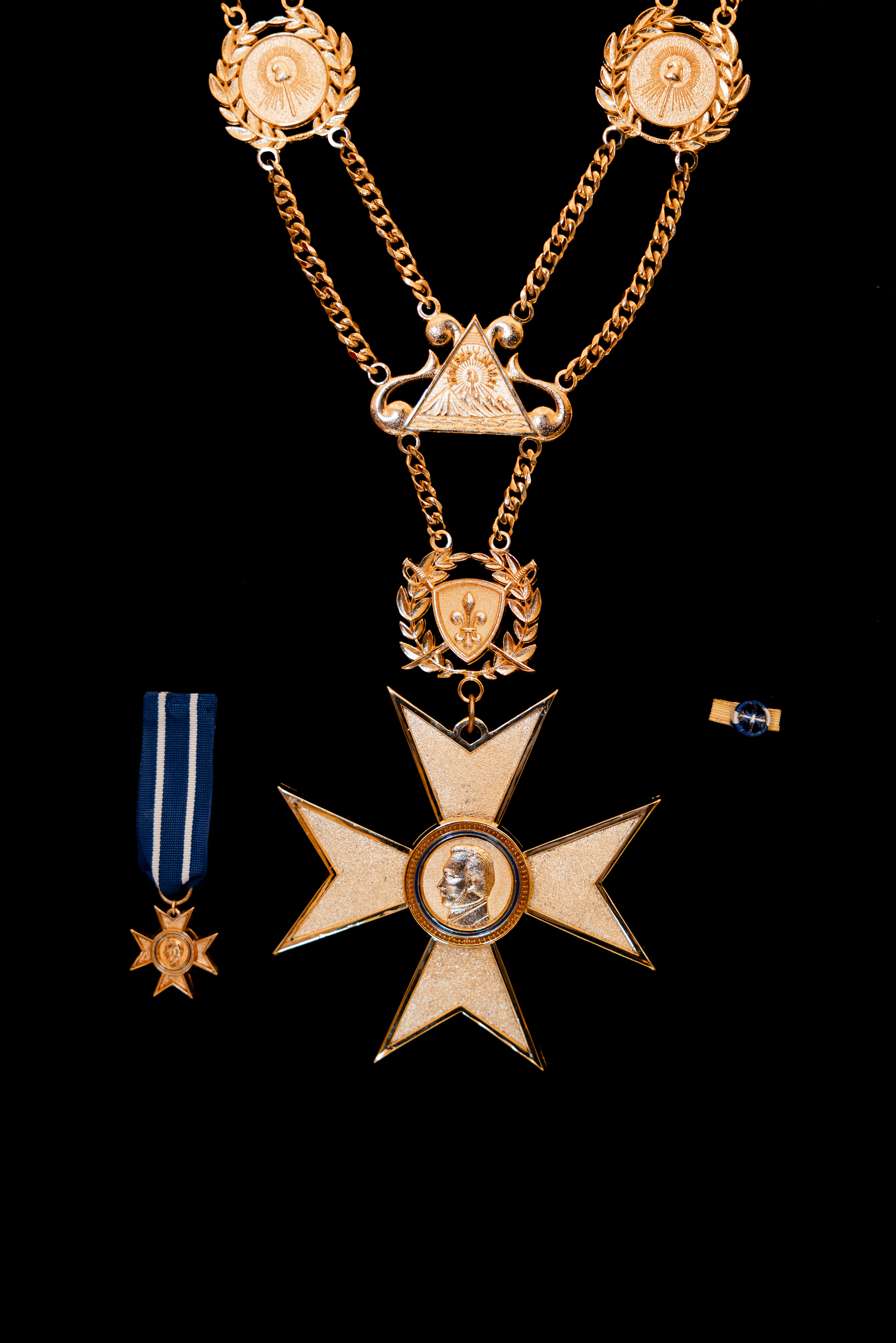
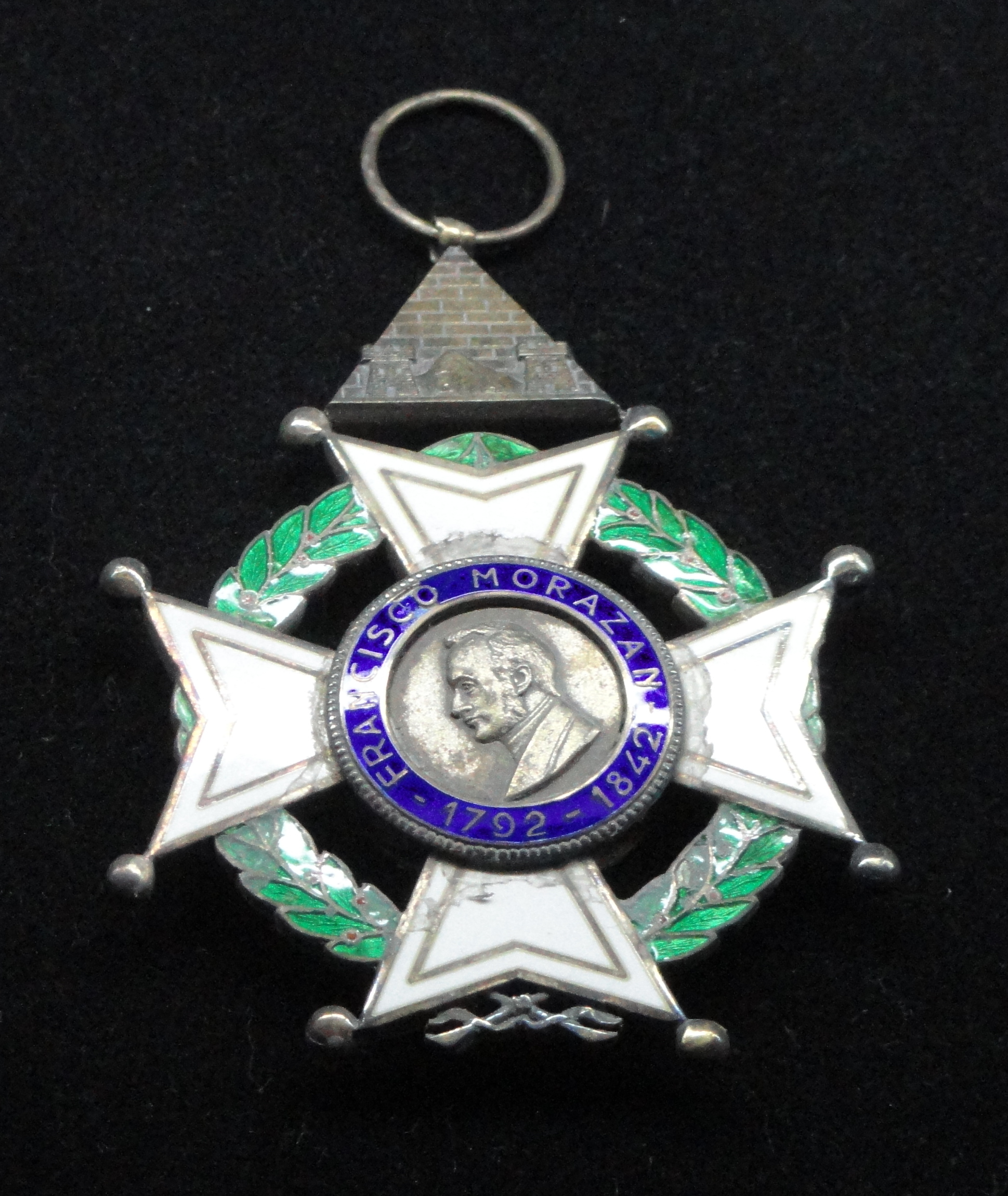
The Salvadoran (left) and Honduran (right) orders named after Morazán

Statues of Morazán were erected in San Salvador in 1882 and Tegucigalpa in 1883. The Morazán Park opened in San José in 1888. In 1942, the Honduran government named Morazán as the "Father of the Nation". The Salvadoran government had similarly declared Morazán to be the "Benefactor of the Fatherland" in 1834.

Morazán is the namesake of various locations. On 6 March 1829, Morazán himself renamed the village of San Miguel, located in the El Tejar municipality of Guatemala, to San Miguel Morazán to commemorate a battle he won there. In 1887, the Legislative Assembly of El Salvador renamed the Gotera Department to the Morazán Department in his honor. In 1943, the Honduran government renamed the Tegucigalpa Department to the Francisco Morazán Department. The Central American localities of Morazán, Honduras; Morazán, Guatemala; Puerto Morazán, Nicaragua; and San Francisco Morazán, El Salvador are all named after the Honduran leader.

Both Honduras and El Salvador have state orders named after Morazán; the Honduran order was established in 1941 and the Salvadoran order in 2021. The Central American Integration System (SICA) also has an order named after Morazán that was established by 2007. Morazán and the Battle of La Trinidad are featured on the Honduran 5 lempira banknote and Morazán was previously featured on coinage of the Salvadoran colón.

Morazán's home in Tegucigalpa has been converted into a museum named "Casa Morazán" that displays over 600 objects related to Morazán's life.

== See also ==
- Anolis morazani, a species of lizard native to Honduras named after Morazán
- List of heads of state and government who were sentenced to death
- List of heads of state and government with a military background
- List of state leaders who have been in exile

== Notes ==
Political offices
New office	Minister General of Honduras; 1824–1826	Succeeded by ?
Preceded by Miguel Eusebio Bustamante	Head of State of Honduras (provisional); 1827–1828	Succeeded by Diego Vigil y Cocaña
Preceded by Mariano Beltranena y Llano (interim)	President of Central America (de facto); 1829	Succeeded by José Francisco Barrundia (interim)
Preceded by Diego Vigil y Cocaña	Head of State of Honduras; 1829	Succeeded by Juan Ángel Arias
Preceded by Juan Ángel Arias	Head of State of Honduras; 1830	Succeeded by José Santos del Valle (provisional)
Preceded by José Francisco Barrundia (interim)	President of Central America; 1830–1834	Succeeded by José Gregorio Salazar (interim)
Preceded by José María Cornejo	Head of State of El Salvador (provisional); 1832	Succeeded by Joaquín de San Martín
Preceded by José Gregorio Salazar (interim)	President of Central America; 1835–1839	Succeeded by Diego Vigil y Cocaña (interim)
Preceded by Antonio José Cañas (acting)	Head of State of El Salvador; 1839–1840	Succeeded by José María Silva (acting)
Preceded by Braulio Carrillo Colina	Head of State of Costa Rica; 1842	Succeeded by António Pinto Soares
