= Herman Allan Padgett =

Herman Allan Padgett (1 October 1936 in El Paraíso, Honduras — 6 February 2001 in La Havana, Cuba) was a Honduran actor, comic, writer, journalist and film producer.

He was commonly known by his radio programs, where he appeared as some popular radio characters as La Escuelita Alegre, Platicando con mi Barbero and Las Aventuras de Margarito el Guardia.

In 1997, he was named as minister of the Secretary of State for Culture, Arts and Sports, charge that maintained until 1999.

Padgett died on 6 February 2001 in La Havana, the national award dedicated to the Honduran television has his name
