= Miguel Eusebio Bustamante =

Miguel Eusebio Bustamante was a politician from Honduras who served as Acting President of Honduras within Federal Republic of Central America from 30 September 1827 to 30 October 1827. He also served as Vice and Deputy Chief of State in 1827.

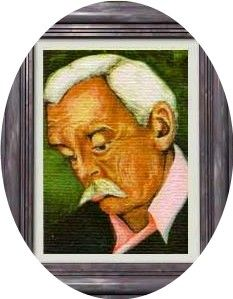
