= HRVV-FM =

Radioactiva 99.7 FM
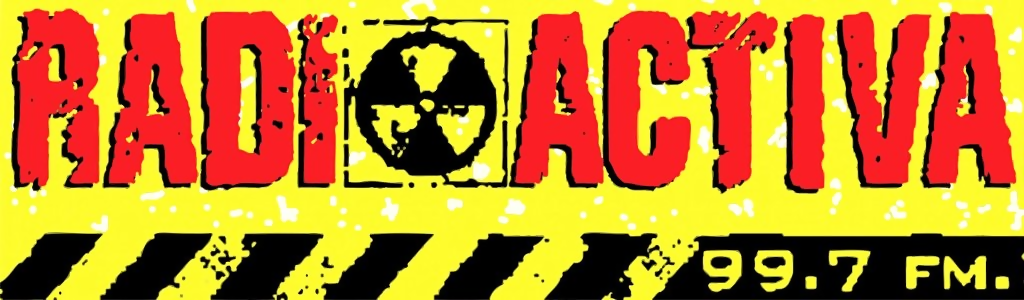

San Pedro Sula; Honduras
- Frequency: 99.7 MHz

Programming
- Language: Spanish
- Format: Latin music, urbano, hip-hop

Ownership
- Owner: Asesores Gerenciales
- Sister stations: – HRAX Musiquera – Estereo Clase

History
- First air date: September 9, 2001

Technical information
- ERP: 10,426 W
- Transmitter coordinates: 15°28′17.0″N 88°03′05.0″W
- Repeater(s): 99.7 FM – Puerto Cortés. 91.1 FM – La Ceiba. 91.1 FM – Danlí. 92.1 FM – Sonaguera.

Links
- Webcast: Listen Live
- Website: radioactiva997.com

HRVV-FM (99.7 FM) is a commercial radio station in San Pedro Sula, Honduras with a Latin and urbano radio format. HRVV-FM is branded as "Radioactiva" and it is owned by Asesores Gerenciales Multimedia.

== History ==
Radioactiva began as a radio program on the station "Estereo Clase", which was broadcasting on the frequency 99.7 FM in the late 1990s in San Pedro Sula. Over time, the program gained popularity, and on 9 September 2001, the radio station "Radioactiva" was created, taking over the 99.7 FM frequency and retaining the call sign HRVV, displacing "Estereo Clase." Later on, Estereo Clase reemerged on the San Pedro Sula dial on the frequency 92.9 FM, maintaining its original oldies music format.

== Technical Information ==
The radio tower in San Pedro Sula (99.7 FM) is at 15°28'17.0"N 88°03'05.0"W, it has an effective radiated power (ERP) of 10,435 watts.

The radio tower in Puerto Cortés (99.7 FM) is at 15°46'37.0"N 87°52'54.0"W, it has an effective radiated power (ERP) of 805 watts.
