= HRAX-FM =

Musiquera (HRAX-FM)
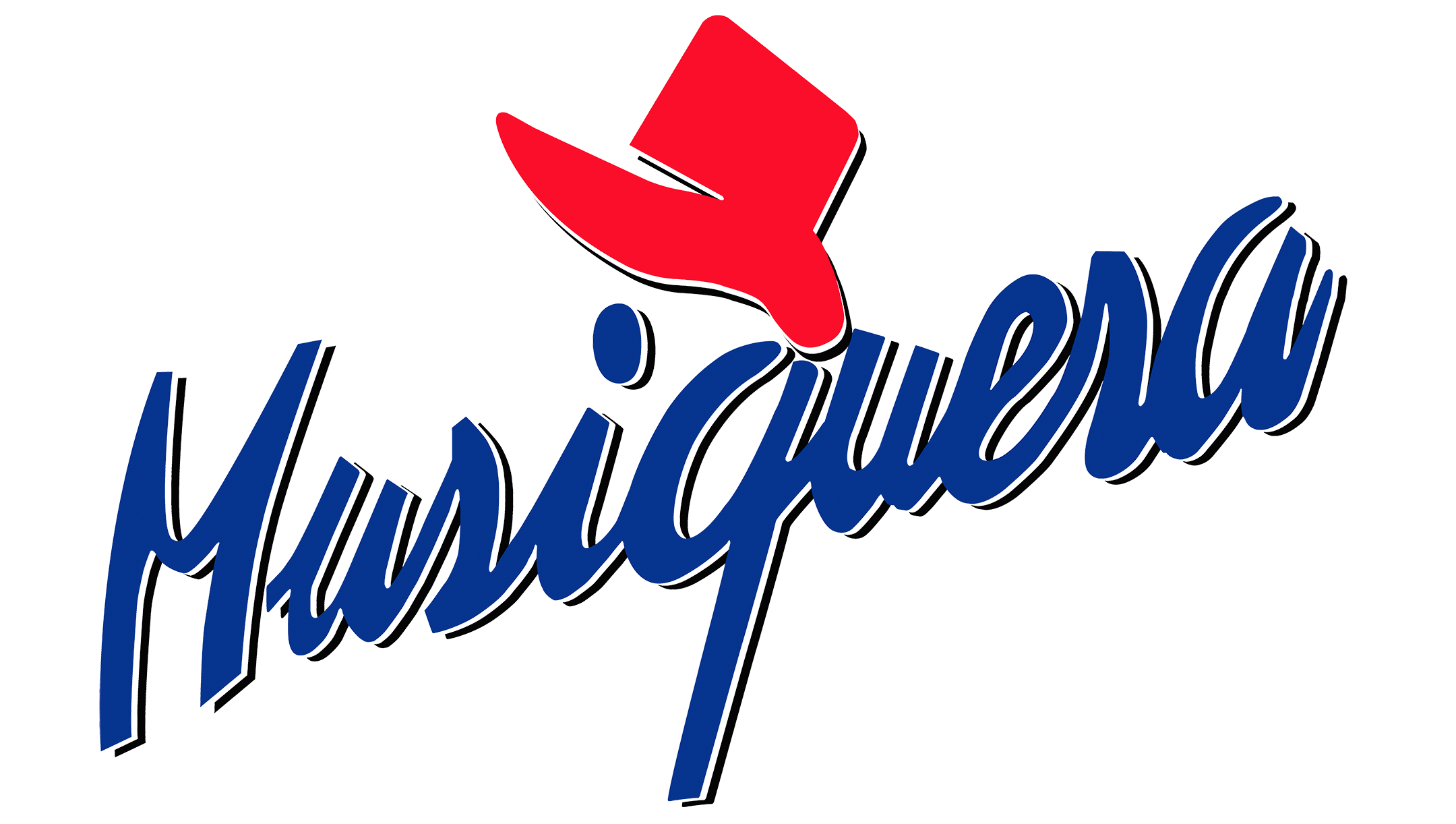

San Pedro Sula; Honduras
- Frequency: 93.3 MHz

Programming
- Language: Spanish
- Format: Ranchera, Latin, Regional Mexican

Ownership
- Owner: Asesores Gerenciales.
- Sister stations: Radioactiva – Estereo Clase

History
- First air date: November 1993
- Former frequencies: 93.1 FM – San Pedro Sula 105.5 FM – Tegucigalpa 100.5 FM – Santa Barbara

Technical information
- Transmitter coordinates: 15°28′17.0″N 88°03′05.0″W
- Repeater: 93.3 FM – San Pedro Sula. 93.3 FM – Puerto Cortés. 93.3 FM – Cuyamel. 105.3 FM – Tegucigalpa. 91.1 FM – Comayagua. 91.1 FM – Siguatepeque. 91.1 FM – La Esperanza. 89.3 FM – Sonaguera. 89.1 FM – Danlí. 88.7 FM – Trujillo. 88.7 FM – La Ceiba. 88.7 FM – Tela. 88.3 FM – Juticalpa. 100.3 FM – Santa Rosa de Copán. 100.3 FM – La Entrada. 100.3 FM – Santa Cruz de Yojoa. 100.3 FM – Ocotepeque. 100.3 FM – Santa Barbara. 103.9 FM – Choluteca. 103.9 FM – Valle.

Links
- Webcast: Listen Live
- Website: musiquera.com

HRAX-FM (93.3 FM), broadcasting as Musiquera, is a commercial radio station in San Pedro Sula, Honduras with a ranchera and Regional Mexicana radio format. It is owned by Asesores Gerenciales Multimedia.

== History ==
The station signed on in november 1993 as "Musiquera" and the call sign HRAX was assigned by Conatel.

HRAX-FM started broadcasting on the internet in 2010.

== Technical information ==
The radio tower in San Pedro Sula (93.3 FM) is located at 15°28'17.0"N 88°03'05.0"W; it has an effective radiated power (ERP) of 4,036 watts.

The radio tower in Tegucigalpa (105.3 FM) is located at 14°05'05.0"N 87°07'47.0"W; it has an effective radiated power (ERP) of 8,464 watts.
